= National Register of Historic Places listings in Caldwell County, North Carolina =

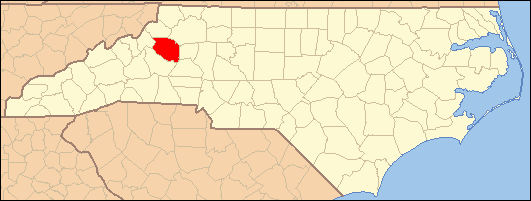

This list includes properties and districts listed on the National Register of Historic Places in Caldwell County, North Carolina. Click the "Map of all coordinates" link to the right to view an online map of all properties and districts with latitude and longitude coordinates in the table below.

== Current listings ==
This National Park Service list is complete through NPS recent listings posted September 26, 2025.

	Name on the Register	Image	Date listed	Location	City or town	Description
1	J.M. Bernhardt Planing Mill and Box Factory-Steele Cotton Mill	J.M. Bernhardt Planing Mill and Box Factory-Steele Cotton Mill	September 18, 2017 (#100001629)	1201 Steele St. 35°54′36″N 81°32′46″W	Lenoir	
2	Caldwell County Courthouse	Caldwell County Courthouse	May 10, 1979 (#79001687)	Main St. 35°54′55″N 81°32′24″W	Lenoir	
3	Carolina and Northwestern Railway Freight Station	Carolina and Northwestern Railway Freight Station	August 29, 2019 (#100004319)	1407 College Ave. SW; 35°54′29″N 81°32′52″W	Lenoir	
4	Clover Hill	Clover Hill	May 25, 1973 (#73001301)	E of Patterson off NC 268 on SR 1514; 35°59′41″N 81°31′40″W	Patterson	
5	Dula-Horton Cemetery	Dula-Horton Cemetery	September 2, 2004 (#04000941)	End of an 0.25 mile Ln, off S side of NC 268, 1.4 miles E of jct. with Grandin Rd. 36°03′45″N 81°24′56″W	Grandin	
6	Fort Defiance	Fort Defiance	September 15, 1970 (#70000444)	N of Lenoir on NC 268; 36°01′01″N 81°29′42″W	Lenoir	Plantation house that was home of William Lenoir (general)
7	The Fountain	The Fountain	September 2, 2004 (#04000942)	1677 NC 268; 35°59′57″N 81°32′19″W	Yadkin Valley	
8	Green Park Historic District	Green Park Historic District	August 19, 1994 (#94001020)	Jct. of US 321 and Green Hill and Rock Rds. 36°07′17″N 81°39′38″W	Blowing Rock	
9	William Hagler House		December 28, 1982 (#82001282)	N of Grandin on SR 1510; 36°03′31″N 81°24′29″W	Grandin	
10	Hudson Cotton Manufacturing Company	Hudson Cotton Manufacturing Company	August 28, 2013 (#13000636)	447 Main St. 35°51′01″N 81°29′44″W	Hudson	
11	Lenoir Cotton Mill-Blue Bell Inc. Plant	Lenoir Cotton Mill-Blue Bell Inc. Plant	September 18, 2017 (#100001630)	1241 College Ave. 35°54′31″N 81°32′47″W	Lenoir	
12	Lenoir Downtown Historic District	Lenoir Downtown Historic District	September 5, 2007 (#07000905)	Roughly bounded by Ashe Ave., Mulberry St., Harper Ave., Church St., and Boundary St.; also 915-1011 West Ave. and 122 Boundary St. 35°54′56″N 81°32′17″W	Lenoir	Second set of addresses reflects a boundary increase of May 8, 2013
13	Lenoir Grammar School	Lenoir Grammar School	April 19, 2006 (#06000290)	506 Harper St. 35°54′59″N 81°32′09″W	Lenoir	
14	Lenoir High School	Lenoir High School	August 2, 1990 (#90001146)	100 Willow St. 35°54′41″N 81°32′37″W	Lenoir	
15	Walter James Lenoir House	Walter James Lenoir House	September 2, 2004 (#04000938)	NC 268, 0.3 miles E of jct. with NC 1513; 36°00′56″N 81°30′12″W	Yadkin Valley	
16	Mariah's Chapel	Mariah's Chapel	September 2, 2004 (#04000939)	NC 1552, 0.4 miles SE of jct with NC 268; 36°03′33″N 81°25′47″W	Grandin	
17	Mary's Grove	Mary's Grove	April 25, 2001 (#01000418)	2121 Harper Ave., SW; 35°53′54″N 81°33′56″W	Lenoir	
18	Patterson School Historic District	Patterson School Historic District	December 22, 2004 (#04001386)	Along both sides of NC 268 at the jct. with NC 1504; 36°01′17″N 81°31′18″W	Legerwood	
19	Edgar Allan Poe House	Edgar Allan Poe House	May 18, 2001 (#01000514)	506 Main St. NW; 35°55′05″N 81°32′28″W	Lenoir	
20	Riverside	Riverside	September 2, 2004 (#04000940)	SW side NC 1552, 0.3 miles SE of jct with NC 268; 36°03′22″N 81°25′55″W	Grandin	

== See also ==
- National Register of Historic Places listings in North Carolina
- List of National Historic Landmarks in North Carolina
