= Cryovac =

Cryovac may refer to:

- Cryovac (brand), the food packaging division of Sealed Air
- Cryovacking, a cooking technique that uses airtight plastic bags combined with long cook times
