= North Carolina–NC State rivalry =

American college sports rivalry

- North Carolina Tar Heels NC State Wolfpack
- Sport: College football; Men's basketball; Women's basketball; Baseball; Soccer
- Latest meeting: College football Winner: NC State (2025) Men's basketball Winner: NC State (2026) Women's basketball Winner: North Carolina (2026) Baseball Winner: North Carolina (2024) Soccer Winner: North Carolina (2024)

Statistics
- Current win streak: College football Winner: NC State, 5 (2021–present) Men's basketball Winner: NC State, 1 (2026–present) Women's basketball Winner: North Carolina, 1 (2026–present) Baseball Winner: NC State, 1 (2026) Soccer Winner: NC State, 1 (2025)

Locations of the two universities in North Carolina.

The North Carolina–NC State rivalry is an ongoing series of athletic competitions between the University of North Carolina at Chapel Hill Tar Heels and North Carolina State University Wolfpack. The intensity of the game is driven by the universities' similar sizes, the fact the schools are separated by only 25 miles, and the large number of alumni that live within the state's borders. Both are charter members of the Atlantic Coast Conference (ACC) and are part of the Tobacco Road schools. The most popular games between the two are in football, basketball, and baseball.

In football, the rivalry game is played at the end of each season during Thanksgiving week. As the ACC has moved to a new scheduling system with protected rivalries, North Carolina and NC State are matched up as permanent rivals so as to allow both schools to face each other annually. Formerly, NC State was in the conference's Atlantic Division and North Carolina was in the Coastal Division and were designated as cross-over rivals that played on a yearly basis. The annual game between both schools is the fiercest football rivalry game in the state of North Carolina.NC State has won the last 5 games in the series, winning the latest contest by a score of 42–19. Current NC State head coach, Dave Doeren, is 9–4 against UNC, including a 5–1 record in Chapel Hill.

Both schools are also known for their basketball history. They have won eight national championships between them (North Carolina 6, NC State 2), and 29 ACC Tournaments (North Carolina 18, NC State 11). North Carolina and NC State are 2 of the 15 college programs that can claim multiple national titles in men's college basketball.

In recent years, some Tar Heel basketball players and fans have claimed that the Wolfpack are not their main rivals in basketball due to the Tar Heels' recent dominance, saying that UNC's top basketball rivalry is the Duke–North Carolina rivalry. However, proponents of the rivalry cite former UNC basketball coach Roy Williams' documented animosity towards NC State and former UNC player Tyler Hansbrough's assertion that his dislike for NC State was greater than his dislike for Duke. Furthermore, many members of the Wolfpack point to the events of the 2024 ACC Tournament, which concluded with NC State upsetting the top-seeded Tar Heels in the championship game, as evidence for the rivalry's legitimacy.

The ACC has split the two in baseball so that the two schools did not meet in the 2014 regular season; the result of that split was the ACC reinstating permanent partners for baseball in 2015. In the interim, the two schools agreed to a nonconference neutral-site game in Durham. NC State and North Carolina faced off in a 3 game series in Raleigh during the 2024 season, with State winning 2 out of the 3 games to win the series.

== Football all-time series records ==
=== All-Time Series Records ===
Listed by number of games won.

- Current streak: 5 – NC State won in 2021, 2022, 2023, 2024, and 2025.
- All-time record: North Carolina: 68; NC State: 41; Ties: 6
- Record in ACC (1953–2025): North Carolina: 37; NC State: 36
- Record since 2000: NC State: 17; North Carolina: 9
- Record in Kenan Memorial Stadium: North Carolina: 28; NC State: 20; Ties: 1
- Record in Carter–Finley Stadium North Carolina: 15; NC State: 14
- Record in Chapel Hill, NC: North Carolina leads 36–23–2
- Record in Charlotte, NC: North Carolina leads 2–0
- Record in Raleigh, NC: North Carolina leads 31–18–4

=== Largest victory margins ===
Listed by score.

- NC State's largest victory margin: 45 points, score: 48–3 (October 15, 1988)
- North Carolina's largest victory margin: 44 points, score: 44–0 (October 12, 1894)

=== Conference Championships ===
- NC State 11 (7 ACC, 3 SAIAA, 1 Southern Conference)
- North Carolina 9 (4 Southern Conference, 5 ACC)

=== Bowl Record ===
- NC State 18–18–1 (.500)
- North Carolina 15–22 (.405)

=== All-Time records ===
- North Carolina 738–577–54 (.559)
- NC State 652–611–55 (.516)

=== Game results since 2000 ===
North Carolina victories	NC State victories	Tie games

No.	Date	Location	Winner	Score
1	October 14, 2000	Chapel Hill, NC	NC State	38–20
2	September 29, 2001	Raleigh, NC	North Carolina	17–9
3	October 12, 2002	Chapel Hill, NC	#14 NC State	34–17
4	September 27, 2003	Raleigh, NC	NC State	47–34
5	October 9, 2004	Chapel Hill, NC	North Carolina	30–24
6	September 24, 2005	Raleigh, NC	North Carolina	31–24
7	November 18, 2006	Chapel Hill, NC	North Carolina	23–9
8	November 10, 2007	Raleigh, NC	NC State	31–27
9	November 22, 2008	Chapel Hill, NC	NC State	41–10
10	November 28, 2009	Raleigh, NC	NC State	28–27
11	November 20, 2010	Chapel Hill, NC	NC State	29–25
12	November 5, 2011	Raleigh, NC	NC State	13–0
13	October 27, 2012	Chapel Hill, NC	North Carolina	43–35

No.	Date	Location	Winner	Score
14	November 2, 2013	Raleigh, NC	North Carolina	27–19
15	November 29, 2014	Chapel Hill, NC	NC State	35–7
16	November 28, 2015	Raleigh, NC	#14 North Carolina	45–34
17	November 25, 2016	Chapel Hill, NC	NC State	28–21
18	November 25, 2017	Raleigh, NC	NC State	33–21
19	November 24, 2018	Chapel Hill, NC	NC State	34–28^{OT}
20	November 30, 2019	Raleigh, NC	North Carolina	41–10
21	October 24, 2020	Chapel Hill, NC	#14 North Carolina	48–21
22	November 26, 2021	Raleigh, NC	#20 NC State	34–30
23	November 25, 2022	Chapel Hill, NC	NC State	30–27^{2OT}
24	November 25, 2023	Raleigh, NC	#22 NC State	39–20
25	November 30, 2024	Chapel Hill, NC	NC State	35–30
26	November 29, 2025	Raleigh, NC	NC State	42–19

== Men's basketball all-time series records ==
Listed by number of games won.

=== All-time series record ===
- North Carolina: 168; NC State: 82

=== Longest Win Streaks ===
- NC State: 15; North Carolina: 13

=== By location ===
- In Chapel Hill: North Carolina: 83; NC State: 21
  - At Woollen Gymnasium: North Carolina: 34; NC State: 12
  - At Carmichael Auditorium: North Carolina 18; NC State: 2
  - At Smith Center: North Carolina: 31; NC State: 7
- In Raleigh: North Carolina: 68; NC State: 51
  - At Thompson Gymnasium: North Carolina: 20; NC State: 13
  - At Reynolds Coliseum: North Carolina: 28; NC State: 31
  - At ESA/RBC/PNC/LC: North Carolina: 20; NC State: 7
- At neutral site: North Carolina: 16; NC State: 10

=== By Titles ===
- NCAA Championships: North Carolina: 6 (1957, 1982, 1993, 2005, 2009, 2017); NC State: 2 (1974, 1983)
- Southern Conference Tournament: NC State: 7; North Carolina: 3
- Dixie Classic: NC State: 7; North Carolina: 3
- Big Four Tournament: NC State: 3; North Carolina: 2
- ACC Tournament: North Carolina: 18; NC State: 11

=== By Final Four appearances ===
- North Carolina: 21; NC State: 4

=== By coach ===
==== North Carolina coaches ====
- Frank McGuire: 13–9
- Dean Smith: 60–30
- Bill Guthridge: 6–1
- Matt Doherty: 2–4
- Roy Williams: 33–5
- Hubert Davis: 7–3

==== NC State coaches ====
- Everett Case: 25–19
- Press Maravich: 2–2
- Norm Sloan: 13–26
- Jim Valvano: 7–18
- Les Robinson: 5–7
- Herb Sendek: 5–17
- Sidney Lowe: 1–10
- Mark Gottfried: 2–10
- Kevin Keatts: 4–13
- Will Wade: 1–0

=== By decade ===
Decade	School	Wins	School	Wins
1910s	NC State	2	North Carolina	0
1920s	North Carolina	17	NC State	3
1930s	North Carolina	16	NC State	6
1940s	North Carolina	13	NC State	10
1950s	NC State	18	North Carolina	10
1960s	North Carolina	18	NC State	4
1970s	North Carolina	17	NC State	13
1980s	North Carolina	18	NC State	7
1990s	North Carolina	15	NC State	7
2000s	North Carolina	16	NC State	5
2010s	North Carolina	18	NC State	3
2020s	North Carolina	10	NC State	4

=== Other ===
Listed by score.

- North Carolina's largest victory margin: 107–56 (January 8, 2017)
- NC State's largest victory margin: 79–39 (February 19, 1949)
Complete List of Scores (1913-Present)

=== Scores of games (1913–present) ===
Winning team is shown in bold. Ranking of the team at the time of the game by the AP poll is shown in parentheses next to the team name (failure to list AP ranking does not necessarily mean the team was not ranked at the time of the game).

**NC State victories**	**North Carolina victories**

No.	Date	Location	NC State		North Carolina		Notes
1	February 22, 1913	Thompson Gymnasium	**NC State**	**26**	North Carolina	18	
2	March 16, 1919	Thompson Gymnasium	**NC State**	**39**	North Carolina	29	
3	February 17, 1920	Woollen Gymnasium	NC State	12	**North Carolina**	**32**	
4	March 6, 1920	Thompson Gymnasium	**NC State**	**32**	North Carolina	21	
5	February 19, 1921	Woollen Gymnasium	NC State	10	**North Carolina**	**62**	
6	March 2, 1921	Thompson Gymnasium	**NC State**	**32**	North Carolina	31	
7	January 23, 1922	Thompson Gymnasium	NC State	17	**North Carolina**	**30**	
8	February 6, 1922	Woollen Gymnasium	NC State	19	**North Carolina**	**49**	
9	February 19, 1923	Thompson Gymnasium	NC State	9	**North Carolina**	**39**	
10	February 21, 1923	Woollen Gymnasium	NC State	26	**North Carolina**	**45**	
11	February 18, 1924	Woollen Gymnasium	NC State	9	**North Carolina**	**44**	
12	February 23, 1924	Thompson Gymnasium	NC State	24	**North Carolina**	**41**	
13	February 10, 1925	Thompson Gymnasium	NC State	17	**North Carolina**	**27**	
14	February 19, 1925	Woollen Gymnasium	NC State	10	**North Carolina**	**27**	
15	February 2, 1926	Woollen Gymnasium	NC State	21	**North Carolina**	**31**	
16	February 18, 1926	Thompson Gymnasium	**NC State**	**17**	North Carolina	8	
17	January 29, 1927	Woollen Gymnasium	NC State	20	**North Carolina**	**40**	
18	February 12, 1927	Thompson Gymnasium	NC State	13	**North Carolina**	**19**	
19	February 1, 1928	Thompson Gymnasium	NC State	21	**North Carolina**	**31**	
20	February 17, 1928	Woollen Gymnasium	NC State	21	**North Carolina**	**31**	
21	January 22, 1929	Woollen Gymnasium	NC State	32	**North Carolina**	**41**	
22	February 13, 1929	Thompson Gymnasium	NC State	34	**North Carolina**	**35**	
23	January 28, 1930	Thompson Gymnasium	NC State	25	**North Carolina**	**27**	
24	February 11, 1930	Woollen Gymnasium	**NC State**	**28**	North Carolina	26	
25	January 27, 1931	Woollen Gymnasium	NC State	18	**North Carolina**	**22**	
26	February 3, 1931	Thompson Gymnasium	**NC State**	**23**	North Carolina	20	
27	January 26, 1932	Thompson Gymnasium	**NC State**	**19**	North Carolina	18	
28	February 23, 1932	Woollen Gymnasium	**NC State**	**36**	North Carolina	17	
29	January 18, 1933	Woollen Gymnasium	NC State	23	**North Carolina**	**32**	
30	February 20, 1933	Thompson Gymnasium	NC State	28	**North Carolina**	**35**	
31	January 24, 1934	Thompson Gymnasium	**NC State**	**34**	North Carolina	30	
32	February 10, 1934	Woollen Gymnasium	NC State	24	**North Carolina**	**45**	
33	January 30, 1935	Woollen Gymnasium	NC State	27	**North Carolina**	**33**	
34	February 19, 1935	Thompson Gymnasium	NC State	35	**North Carolina**	**37**	
35	March 1, 1935	Thompson Gymnasium	NC State	28	**North Carolina**	**30**	
36	January 18, 1936	Woollen Gymnasium	NC State	35	**North Carolina**	**37**	
37	February 14, 1936	Thompson Gymnasium	NC State	29	**North Carolina**	**31**	
38	March 6, 1936	Thompson Gymnasium	NC State	28	**North Carolina**	**31**	
39	January 19, 1937	Thompson Gymnasium	NC State	35	**North Carolina**	**41**	
40	February 1, 1937	Woollen Gymnasium	NC State	31	**North Carolina**	**34**	
41	January 25, 1938	Woollen Gymnasium	NC State	31	**North Carolina**	**39**	
42	February 22, 1938	Thompson Gymnasium	NC State	32	**North Carolina**	**41**	
43	January 22, 1939	Thompson Gymnasium	**NC State**	**35**	North Carolina	22	
44	February 17, 1939	Woollen Gymnasium	NC State	25	**North Carolina**	**40**	
45	January 23, 1940	Woollen Gymnasium	NC State	41	**North Carolina**	**52**	
46	February 16, 1940	Thompson Gymnasium	NC State	36	**North Carolina**	**60**	
47	January 21, 1941	Thompson Gymnasium	NC State	26	**North Carolina**	**47**	
48	February 12, 1941	Woollen Gymnasium	NC State	30	**North Carolina**	**60**	
49	January 20, 1942	Woollen Gymnasium	NC State	28	**North Carolina**	**41**	
50	February 12, 1942	Thompson Gymnasium	**NC State**	**32**	North Carolina	30	
51	January 20, 1943	Thompson Gymnasium	**NC State**	**47**	North Carolina	36	
52	February 9, 1943	Woollen Gymnasium	NC State	36	**North Carolina**	**45**	
53	January 15, 1944	Woollen Gymnasium	NC State	24	**North Carolina**	**52**	
54	January 26, 1944	Thompson Gymnasium	NC State	27	**North Carolina**	**42**	
55	January 26, 1945	Woollen Gymnasium	NC State	46	**North Carolina**	**61**	
56	February 12, 1945	Thompson Gymnasium	NC State	35	**North Carolina**	**43**	
57	February 22, 1945	Raleigh Memorial Auditorium	NC State	28	**North Carolina**	**55**	
58	January 23, 1946	Woollen Gymnasium	NC State	34	**North Carolina**	**71**	
59	February 11, 1946	Thompson Gymnasium	NC State	44	**North Carolina**	**55**	
60	February 1, 1947	Woollen Gymnasium	**NC State**	**48**	North Carolina	46	Overtime
61	March 8, 1947	Duke Indoor Stadium	**NC State**	**50**	North Carolina	48	
62	February 3, 1948	Thompson Gymnasium	**NC State**	**81**	North Carolina	42	
63	February 21, 1948	Woollen Gymnasium	**NC State**	**69**	North Carolina	45	
64	March 5, 1948	Duke Indoor Stadium	**NC State**	**55**	North Carolina	50	
65	January 22, 1949	Thompson Gymnasium	**NC State**	**67**	North Carolina	36	
66	February 19, 1949	Woollen Gymnasium	**NC State (17)**	**79**	North Carolina	39	
67	March 4, 1949	Duke Indoor Stadium	**NC State (13)**	**43**	North Carolina	40	
68	January 21, 1950	Woollen Gymnasium	**NC State (12)**	**61**	North Carolina	57	
69	February 21, 1950	Reynolds Coliseum	**NC State (9)**	**70**	North Carolina	44	
70	January 27, 1951	Reynolds Coliseum	**NC State (8)**	**71**	North Carolina	58	
71	February 17, 1951	Woollen Gymnasium	**NC State (9)**	**68**	North Carolina	53	
72	December 28, 1951	Reynolds Coliseum	**NC State (19)**	**58**	North Carolina	51	
73	January 26, 1952	Woollen Gymnasium	**NC State**	**58**	North Carolina	53	
74	February 23, 1952	Reynolds Coliseum	**NC State**	**71**	North Carolina	52	
75	January 24, 1953	Reynolds Coliseum	NC State (8)	69	**North Carolina**	**70**	
76	February 21, 1953	Woollen Gymnasium	**NC State (15)**	**87**	North Carolina	66	
77	March 5, 1953	Reynolds Coliseum	**NC State (12)**	**86**	North Carolina	54	
78	January 19, 1954	Woollen Gymnasium	**NC State**	**84**	North Carolina	77	
79	February 24, 1954	Reynolds Coliseum	**NC State**	**57**	North Carolina	48	
80	March 4, 1954	Reynolds Coliseum	**NC State (18)**	**52**	North Carolina	51	
81	December 28, 1954	Reynolds Coliseum	**NC State (2)**	**47**	North Carolina	44	
82	January 18, 1955	Woollen Gymnasium	NC State (2)	80	**North Carolina**	**84**	
83	February 22, 1955	Reynolds Coliseum	**NC State (6)**	**79**	North Carolina	75	
84	December 31, 1955	Reynolds Coliseum	**NC State (3)**	**82**	North Carolina (4)	60	
85	January 18, 1956	Woollen Gymnasium	NC State (3)	69	**North Carolina (9)**	**73**	
86	February 21, 1956	Reynolds Coliseum	**NC State (6)**	**79**	North Carolina (9)	73	
87	January 15, 1957	Reynolds Coliseum	NC State	57	**North Carolina (2)**	**83**	
88	February 19, 1957	Woollen Gymnasium	NC State	57	**North Carolina (1)**	**86**	
89	December 28, 1957	Reynolds Coliseum	NC State (13)	30	**North Carolina (4)**	**39**	
90	January 15, 1958	Woollen Gymnasium	**NC State (20)**	**58**	North Carolina (6)	57	Overtime
91	February 18, 1958	Reynolds Coliseum	NC State (9)	69	**North Carolina (16)**	**81**	
92	March 7, 1958	Reynolds Coliseum	NC State (14)	58	**North Carolina (13)**	**64**	
93	January 14, 1959	Reynolds Coliseum	NC State (1)	68	**North Carolina (3)**	**72**	Overtime
94	February 18, 1959	Woollen Gymnasium	NC State (6)	54	**North Carolina (1)**	**64**	
95	March 7, 1959	Reynolds Coliseum	**NC State (10)**	**80**	North Carolina (5)	56	
96	January 13, 1960	Woollen Gymnasium	NC State	51	**North Carolina (16)**	**62**	
97	February 17, 1960	Reynolds Coliseum	NC State	62	**North Carolina (19)**	**66**	
98	January 18, 1961	Reynolds Coliseum	NC State	66	**North Carolina (6)**	**97**	
99	February 15, 1961	Woollen Gymnasium	NC State	56	**North Carolina (7)**	**62**	
100	January 17, 1962	Woollen Gymnasium	NC State	56	**North Carolina**	**66**	
101	February 14, 1962	Reynolds Coliseum	**NC State**	**85**	North Carolina	57	
102	January 16, 1963	Woollen Gymnasium	NC State	65	**North Carolina**	**67**	Overtime
103	February 12, 1963	Reynolds Coliseum	NC State	63	**North Carolina**	**68**	
104	January 15, 1964	Woollen Gymnasium	NC State	71	**North Carolina**	**79**	
105	February 22, 1964	Reynolds Coliseum	**NC State**	**51**	North Carolina	49	
106	January 13, 1965	Woollen Gymnasium	**NC State**	**65**	North Carolina	62	
107	February 17, 1965	Reynolds Coliseum	NC State	68	**North Carolina**	**69**	
108	January 12, 1966	Carmichael Auditorium	NC State	75	**North Carolina**	**83**	
109	February 15, 1966	Reynolds Coliseum	**NC State**	**87**	North Carolina	77	
110	January 11, 1967	Carmichael Auditorium	NC State	78	**North Carolina (5)**	**79**	
111	February 14, 1967	Reynolds Coliseum	NC State	60	**North Carolina (4)**	**77**	
112	March 9, 1967	Greensboro Coliseum	NC State	53	**North Carolina (4)**	**56**	
113	January 10, 1968	Reynolds Coliseum	NC State	66	**North Carolina (3)**	**68**	
114	February 12, 1968	Carmichael Auditorium	NC State	84	**North Carolina (3)**	**96**	
115	March 9, 1968	Charlotte Coliseum	NC State	50	**North Carolina (5)**	**87**	
116	January 8, 1969	Carmichael Auditorium	NC State	63	**North Carolina (2)**	**83**	
117	February 10, 1969	Reynolds Coliseum	NC State	62	**North Carolina (2)**	**85**	
118	January 7, 1970	Reynolds Coliseum	NC State (10)	69	**North Carolina (4)**	**78**	
119	February 9, 1970	Carmichael Auditorium	NC State (5)	86	**North Carolina (10)**	**88**	
120	December 18, 1970	Greensboro Coliseum	**NC State**	**82**	North Carolina (20)	70	
121	February 8, 1971	Reynolds Coliseum	NC State	63	**North Carolina (11)**	**65**	
122	March 3, 1971	Carmichael Auditorium	NC State	81	**North Carolina (12)**	**97**	
123	December 18, 1971	Greensboro Coliseum	NC State	68	**North Carolina (4)**	**99**	
124	February 7, 1972	Carmichael Auditorium	NC State	78	**North Carolina (3)**	**101**	
125	February 29, 1972	Reynolds Coliseum	**NC State**	**85**	North Carolina (3)	84	
126	December 16, 1972	Greensboro Coliseum	**NC State (6)**	**68**	North Carolina (11)	61	
127	February 5, 1973	Reynolds Coliseum	**NC State (2)**	**76**	North Carolina (6)	73	
128	February 27, 1973	Reynolds Coliseum	**NC State (2)**	**82**	North Carolina (7)	78	
129	January 4, 1974	Greensboro Coliseum	**NC State (5)**	**78**	North Carolina (4)	77	
130	January 22, 1974	Carmichael Auditorium	**NC State (3)**	**83**	North Carolina (4)	80	
131	February 26, 1974	Reynolds Coliseum	**NC State (1)**	**83**	North Carolina (4)	72	
132	January 4, 1975	Greensboro Coliseum	**NC State (1)**	**82**	North Carolina (8)	67	
133	January 18, 1975	Reynolds Coliseum	**NC State (4)**	**88**	North Carolina (14)	85	
134	February 25, 1975	Carmichael Auditorium	NC State (7)	54	**North Carolina (14)**	**64**	
135	March 8, 1975	Greensboro Coliseum	NC State (8)	66	**North Carolina (12)**	**70**	
136	January 18, 1976	Carmichael Auditorium	**NC State (13)**	**68**	North Carolina (7)	67	
137	February 24, 1976	Reynolds Coliseum	NC State (11)	79	**North Carolina (4)**	**91**	
138	November 26, 1976	Greensboro Coliseum	NC State (15)	66	**North Carolina (3)**	**78**	
139	January 19, 1977	Reynolds Coliseum	**NC State**	**75**	North Carolina (4)	73	
140	February 23, 1977	Carmichael Auditorium	NC State	73	**North Carolina (9)**	**90**	
141	March 4, 1977	Greensboro Coliseum	NC State	56	**North Carolina (6)**	**70**	
142	December 3, 1977	Greensboro Coliseum	NC State	82	**North Carolina (2)**	**87**	
143	January 18, 1978	Carmichael Auditorium	NC State	64	**North Carolina (5)**	**69**	
144	February 23, 1978	Reynolds Coliseum	**NC State**	**72**	North Carolina (8)	67	
145	January 17, 1979	Reynolds Coliseum	NC State (14)	69	**North Carolina (2)**	**70**	
146	February 22, 1979	Carmichael Auditorium	NC State	56	**North Carolina (4)**	**71**	
147	November 30, 1980	Greensboro Coliseum	NC State	84	**North Carolina (6)**	**97**	
148	January 16, 1980	Carmichael Auditorium	NC State (16)	64	**North Carolina (9)**	**67**	
149	February 20, 1980	Reynolds Coliseum	**NC State**	**63**	North Carolina (8)	60	
150	January 14, 1981	Carmichael Auditorium	NC State	70	**North Carolina (17)**	**73**	
151	January 31, 1981	Reynolds Coliseum	NC State	54	**North Carolina (12)**	**57**	
152	March 5, 1981	Capital Centre	NC State	54	**North Carolina (12)**	**69**	
153	January 13, 1982	Reynolds Coliseum	NC State (12)	41	**North Carolina (1)**	**61**	
154	January 30, 1982	Carmichael Auditorium	NC State (17)	44	**North Carolina (2)**	**58**	
155	March 6, 1982	Greensboro Coliseum	NC State	46	**North Carolina (1)**	**58**	
156	January 19, 1983	Carmichael Auditorium	NC State	81	**North Carolina (3)**	**99**	
157	February 19, 1983	Reynolds Coliseum	**NC State**	**70**	North Carolina (3)	63	
158	March 12, 1983	The Omni	**NC State**	**91**	North Carolina (5)	84	Overtime
159	January 7, 1984	Reynolds Coliseum	NC State (12)	60	**North Carolina (1)**	**81**	
160	February 18, 1984	Carmichael Auditorium	NC State	71	**North Carolina (1)**	**95**	
161	January 16, 1985	Carmichael Auditorium	NC State	76	**North Carolina (6)**	**86**	
162	February 16, 1985	Reynolds Coliseum	**NC State**	**85**	North Carolina (13)	76	
163	March 9, 1985	The Omni	NC State (18)	51	**North Carolina (6)**	**57**	
164	January 4, 1986	Carmichael Auditorium	NC State	79	**North Carolina (1)**	**90**	
165	February 23, 1986	Reynolds Coliseum	**NC State (20)**	**76**	North Carolina (1)	65	
166	January 18, 1987	Dean Smith Center	NC State (17)	78	**North Carolina (3)**	**96**	
167	February 5, 1987	Reynolds Coliseum	NC State	79	**North Carolina (3)**	**96**	
168	March 8, 1987	Capital Centre	**NC State**	**68**	North Carolina (2)	67	
169	January 24, 1988	Reynolds Coliseum	NC State (20)	73	**North Carolina (2)**	**77**	
170	February 11, 1988	Dean Smith Center	NC State (16)	73	**North Carolina (6)**	**75**	
171	January 21, 1989	Dean Smith Center	NC State (15)	81	**North Carolina (13)**	**84**	
172	February 9, 1989	Reynolds Coliseum	**NC State (17)**	**98**	North Carolina (6)	88	
173	January 20, 1990	Reynolds Coliseum	NC State (19)	81	**North Carolina**	**91**	
174	February 7, 1990	Dean Smith Center	**NC State**	**88**	North Carolina	77	
175	February 6, 1991	Reynolds Coliseum	**NC State**	**97**	North Carolina (9)	91	
176	February 7, 1991	Dean Smith Center	NC State	70	**North Carolina (9)**	**92**	
177	January 22, 1992	Reynolds Coliseum	**NC State**	**99**	North Carolina (10)	88	
178	February 22, 1992	Dean Smith Center	**NC State**	**99**	North Carolina (4)	94	
179	January 7, 1993	Reynolds Coliseum	NC State	67	**North Carolina (6)**	**100**	
180	February 6, 1993	Dean Smith Center	NC State	58	**North Carolina (6)**	**104**	
181	January 5, 1994	Dean Smith Center	NC State	58	**North Carolina (2)**	**88**	
182	February 5, 1994	Reynolds Coliseum	NC State	64	**North Carolina (2)**	**77**	
183	January 4, 1995	Reynolds Coliseum	**NC State**	**80**	North Carolina (1)	70	
184	February 4, 1995	Dean Smith Center	NC State	63	**North Carolina (2)**	**82**	
185	January 4, 1996	Dean Smith Center	NC State	72	**North Carolina (16)**	**96**	
186	February 3, 1996	Reynolds Coliseum	**NC State**	**78**	North Carolina (8)	75	
187	January 15, 1997	Dean Smith Center	NC State	56	**North Carolina (22)**	**59**	
188	February 12, 1997	Reynolds Coliseum	NC State	44	**North Carolina (16)**	**45**	
189	March 9, 1997	Greensboro Coliseum	NC State	54	**North Carolina (5)**	**64**	
190	January 21, 1998	Reynolds Coliseum	NC State	60	**North Carolina**	**74**	
191	February 21, 1998	Dean Smith Center	**NC State**	**86**	North Carolina	72	
192	March 6, 1998	Greensboro Coliseum	NC State	46	**North Carolina**	**74**	
193	January 16, 1999	Reynolds Coliseum	NC State	56	**North Carolina**	**59**	
194	February 17, 1999	Dean Smith Center	NC State	53	**North Carolina**	**62**	
195	January 8, 2000	Dean Smith Center	NC State	75	**North Carolina**	**83**	
196	February 9, 2000	PNC Arena	NC State	62	**North Carolina**	**70**	
197	January 28, 2001	PNC Arena	NC State	52	**North Carolina**	**60**	
198	February 28, 2001	Dean Smith Center	NC State	63	**North Carolina**	**76**	
199	January 23, 2002	Dean Smith Center	**NC State (NR)**	**77**	North Carolina (NR)	59	Article about game
200	February 24, 2002	PNC Arena	**NC State (NR)**	**98**	North Carolina (NR)	76	Article about game
201	January 26, 2003	PNC Arena	**NC State (NR)**	**86**	North Carolina (NR)	77	Article about game
202	February 25, 2003	Dean Smith Center	**NC State (NR)**	**75**	North Carolina (NR)	67	Overtime; Article
203	January 28, 2004	Dean Smith Center	NC State (NR)	66	**North Carolina (12)**	**68**	Article about game
204	February 29, 2004	PNC Arena	NC State (14)	64	**North Carolina (12)**	**71**	Article about game
205	February 3, 2005	Dean Smith Center	NC State (NR)	71	**North Carolina (2)**	**95**	Article about game
206	February 22, 2005	PNC Arena	NC State (NR)	71	**North Carolina (2)**	**81**	Article about game
207	January 7, 2006	Dean Smith Center	NC State (13)	69	**North Carolina (25)**	**82**	Article about game
208	February 22, 2006	PNC Arena	NC State (15)	71	**North Carolina (21)**	**95**	Article about game
209	February 3, 2007	PNC Arena	**NC State (NR)**	**83**	North Carolina (3)	79	Article about game
210	February 21, 2007	Dean Smith Center	NC State (NR)	64	**North Carolina (5)**	**83**	Article about game
211	March 11, 2007	Tampa Bay Times Forum	NC State (NR)	80	**North Carolina (8)**	**89**	Article about game
212	January 12, 2008	Dean Smith Center	NC State (NR)	62	**North Carolina (1)**	**93**	Article about game
213	February 20, 2008	PNC Arena	NC State (NR)	70	**North Carolina (3)**	**84**	Article about game
214	January 31, 2009	PNC Arena	NC State (NR)	76	**North Carolina (5)**	**93**	Article about game
215	February 18, 2009	Dean Smith Center	NC State (NR)	80	**North Carolina (3)**	**89**	Article about game
216	January 26, 2010	PNC Arena	NC State (NR)	63	**North Carolina (NR)**	**77**	Article about game
217	February 13, 2010	Dean Smith Center	NC State (NR)	61	**North Carolina (NR)**	**74**	Article about game
218	January 29, 2011	Dean Smith Center	NC State (NR)	64	**North Carolina (NR)**	**84**	Article about game
219	February 23, 2011	PNC Arena	NC State (NR)	63	**North Carolina (19)**	**75**	Article about game
220	January 26, 2012	Dean Smith Center	NC State (NR)	55	**North Carolina (7)**	**74**	Article about game
221	February 21, 2012	PNC Arena	NC State (NR)	74	**North Carolina (7)**	**86**	Article about game
222	March 10, 2012	Philips Arena	NC State (NR)	67	**North Carolina (4)**	**69**	Article about game
223	January 26, 2013	PNC Arena	**NC State (18)**	**91**	North Carolina (NR)	83	Article about game
224	February 23, 2013	Dean Smith Center	NC State (NR)	65	**North Carolina (NR)**	**76**	Article about game
225	February 1, 2014	Dean Smith Center	NC State (NR)	70	**North Carolina (NR)**	**84**	Article about game
226	February 26, 2014	PNC Arena	NC State (NR)	84	**North Carolina (19)**	**85**	Overtime; Article
227	January 14, 2015	PNC Arena	NC State (NR)	79	**North Carolina (15)**	**81**	Article about game
228	February 24, 2015	Dean Smith Center	**NC State (NR)**	**58**	North Carolina (15)	46	Article about game
229	January 16, 2016	Dean Smith Center	NC State (NR)	55	**North Carolina (5)**	**67**	Article about game
230	February 24, 2016	PNC Arena	NC State (NR)	68	**North Carolina (7)**	**80**	Article about game
231	January 8, 2017	Dean Smith Center	NC State (NR)	56	**North Carolina (14)**	**107**	Article about game
232	February 15, 2017	PNC Arena	NC State (NR)	73	**North Carolina (10)**	**97**	Article about game
233	January 27, 2018	Dean Smith Center	**NC State (NR)**	**95**	North Carolina (10)	91	Overtime; Article
234	February 10, 2018	PNC Arena	NC State (NR)	89	**North Carolina (21)**	**96**	Article about game
235	January 8, 2019	PNC Arena	NC State (15)	82	**North Carolina (12)**	**90**	Article about game
236	February 5, 2019	Dean Smith Center	NC State (NR)	96	**North Carolina (8)**	**113**	Article about game
237	January 27, 2020	PNC Arena	NC State (NR)	65	**North Carolina (NR)**	**75**	Article about game
238	February 26, 2020	Dean Smith Center	NC State (NR)	79	**North Carolina (NR)**	**85**	Article about game
239	December 22, 2020	PNC Arena	**NC State (NR)**	**79**	North Carolina (17)	76	Article about game
240	January 23, 2021	Dean Smith Center	NC State (NR)	76	**North Carolina (NR)**	**86**	Article about game
241	January 29, 2022	Dean Smith Center	NC State (NR)	80	**North Carolina (NR)**	**100**	Article about game
242	February 26, 2022	PNC Arena	NC State (NR)	74	**North Carolina (NR)**	**84**	Article about game
243	January 21, 2023	Dean Smith Center	NC State (NR)	69	**North Carolina (NR)**	**80**	Article about game
244	February 19, 2023	PNC Arena	**NC State (23)**	**77**	North Carolina (NR)	69	Article about game
245	January 10, 2024	PNC Arena	NC State (NR)	54	**North Carolina (7)**	**67**	Article about game
246	March 2, 2024	Dean Smith Center	NC State (NR)	70	**North Carolina (9)**	**79**	Article about game
247	March 16, 2024	Capital One Arena	**NC State (NR)**	**84**	North Carolina (4)	76	Article about game
248	January 11, 2025	Lenovo Center	NC State (NR)	61	**North Carolina (NR)**	**63**	Article about game
249	February 29, 2025	Dean Smith Center	NC State (NR)	73	**North Carolina (NR)**	**97**	Article about game
250	February 17, 2026	Lenovo Center	**NC State (NR)**	**82**	North Carolina (16)	58	Article about game
Series: North Carolina leads 168–82

== Women's basketball all-time series records ==
Listed by number of games won.

=== All-time series record ===
- NC State: 65; UNC: 57

=== Longest Win Streaks ===
- NC State: 19; UNC: 8

=== By location ===
- In Chapel Hill: NC State: 21; UNC: 32
  - At Carmichael Auditorium/Arena: NC State: 21; UNC: 31
  - At Smith Center: NC State: 0; UNC: 1
- In Raleigh: NC State: 35; UNC: 18
  - At Reynolds Coliseum: NC State: 34; UNC: 18
  - At Broughton: NC State: 1; UNC: 0
- At neutral site: NC State: 9; UNC: 7

=== By Titles ===
- NCAA Championships: NC State: 0; UNC: 1
- NCAA Final Fours: NC State: 2; UNC: 3
- ACC Tournament: NC State: 7; UNC: 9
- ACC Regular Season: NC State: 7; UNC: 4

=== By coach ===
==== NC State coaches ====
- Robert R. Doak (74–75): 0–2
- Kay Yow (75–09): 49–37
- Kellie Harper (09–13): 2–6
- Wes Moore (13–Present): 14–12

==== UNC coaches ====
- Angela Lumpkin (74–77): 3–4
- Jennifer Alley (77–86): 7–20
- Sylvia Hatchell (86–19): 41–34
- Courtney Banghart (19–Present): 6–7

=== By decade ===
Decade	School	Wins	School	Wins
1970s	NC State	11	UNC	3
1980s	NC State	19	UNC	8
1990s	NC State	13	UNC	10
2000s	UNC	18	NC State	6
2010s	UNC	11	NC State	9
2020s	NC State	7	UNC	6

=== Other ===
Listed by score.

- NC State's largest victory margin: 89–58 (February 10, 1978)
- UNC's largest victory margin: 85–51 (February 13, 1975)
Complete List of Scores (1975–Present)

=== Scores of games (1975–Present) ===
NC State victories	North Carolina victories

No.	Date	Location	NC State		North Carolina		Notes
1	January 13, 1975	Reynolds Coliseum	NC State	47	North Carolina	74	
2	February 13, 1975	Carmichael Auditorium	NC State	51	North Carolina	85	
3	December 6, 1975	Carmichael Auditorium	NC State	61	North Carolina	74	
4	January 27, 1976	Reynolds Coliseum	NC State	68	North Carolina	58	
5	March 5, 1976	Carmichael Auditorium	NC State	77	North Carolina	74	
6	December 6, 1976	Reynolds Coliseum	NC State	71	North Carolina	58	
7	February 19, 1977	Carmichael Auditorium	NC State (9)	74	North Carolina	62	
8	January 10, 1978	Carmichael Auditorium	NC State (5)	75	North Carolina	59	
9	February 10, 1978	University Hall	NC State (2)	89	North Carolina	58	
10	February 22, 1978	Reynolds Coliseum	NC State (3)	92	North Carolina	70	
11	December 5, 1978	Carmichael Auditorium	NC State (3)	87	North Carolina	81	
12	January 24, 1979	Reynolds Coliseum	NC State (8)	91	North Carolina	64	
13	February 24, 1979	Boone, NC	NC State (9)	95	North Carolina	77	
14	December 4, 1979	Reynolds Coliseum	NC State (5)	89	North Carolina	66	
15	January 23, 1980	Carmichael Auditorium	NC State (10)	85	North Carolina	68	
16	February 9, 1980	Cole Field House	NC State (9)	90	North Carolina	63	
17	February 23, 1980	Reynolds Coliseum	NC State (8)	81	North Carolina	59	
18	December 6, 1980	Carmichael Auditorium	NC State (10)	65	North Carolina	61	
19	January 22, 1981	Reynolds Coliseum	NC State (12)	67	North Carolina	62	
20	February 12, 1981	Littlejohn Coliseum	NC State (13)	77	North Carolina	64	
21	March 4, 1981	Carmichael Auditorium	NC State (16)	70	North Carolina	50	
22	December 12, 1981	Reynolds Coliseum	NC State (9)	71	North Carolina	63	
23	February 16, 1982	Carmichael Auditorium	NC State (7)	65	North Carolina	78	
24	January 18, 1983	Carmichael Auditorium	NC State (19)	66	North Carolina	68	
25	February 15, 1983	Reynolds Coliseum	NC State (18)	97	North Carolina (20)	82	
26	January 17, 1984	Reynolds Coliseum	NC State (16)	70	North Carolina	71	
27	February 11, 1984	Carmichael Auditorium	NC State (16)	74	North Carolina (15)	68	
28	March 4, 1984	Civic Center	NC State (16)	76	North Carolina (18)	99	
29	December 29, 1984	Reynolds Coliseum	NC State	81	North Carolina (17)	69	
30	January 15, 1985	Carmichael Auditorium	NC State (17)	74	North Carolina	77	
31	February 9, 1985	Reynolds Coliseum	NC State (20)	70	North Carolina	63	
32	March 3, 1985	Civic Center	NC State (13)	81	North Carolina	80	
33	January 16, 1986	Reynolds Coliseum	NC State (17)	68	North Carolina (18)	70	
34	February 9, 1986	Carmichael Auditorium	NC State	79	North Carolina (13)	81	Overtime
35	January 13, 1987	Carmichael Auditorium	NC State (14)	82	North Carolina	76	
36	February 10, 1987	Reynolds Coliseum	NC State (14)	51	North Carolina	44	
37	March 1, 1987	Civic Center	NC State (16)	70	North Carolina	63	
38	January 12, 1988	Reynolds Coliseum	NC State	72	North Carolina	63	
39	February 9, 1988	Carmichael Auditorium	NC State	74	North Carolina	75	Double Overtime
40	January 28, 1989	Carmichael Auditorium	NC State (13)	86	North Carolina	69	
41	February 7, 1989	Reynolds Coliseum	NC State (12)	93	North Carolina	72	
42	January 24, 1990	Reynolds Coliseum	NC State (11)	85	North Carolina	69	
43	February 18, 1990	Carmichael Auditorium	NC State (9)	105	North Carolina	86	
44	March 3, 1990	Civic Center	NC State (9)	80	North Carolina	61	
45	January 23, 1991	Carmichael Auditorium	NC State (3)	79	North Carolina	69	
46	February 12, 1991	Reynolds Coliseum	NC State (7)	90	North Carolina	70	
47	January 22, 1992	Carmichael Auditorium	NC State (20)	77	North Carolina (25)	82	Overtime
48	February 5, 1992	Reynolds Coliseum	NC State	71	North Carolina (21)	65	
49	January 27, 1993	Carmichael Auditorium	NC State	41	North Carolina (16)	71	
50	February 16, 1993	Reynolds Coliseum	NC State	60	North Carolina (14)	55	
51	March 5, 1993	Winthrop Coliseum	NC State	71	North Carolina (18)	89	
52	January 27, 1994	Reynolds Coliseum	NC State	66	North Carolina (5)	87	
53	February 16, 1994	Carmichael Auditorium	NC State	54	North Carolina (5)	81	
54	January 18, 1995	Carmichael Auditorium	NC State	62	North Carolina (3)	71	
55	February 19, 1995	Reynolds Coliseum	NC State	88	North Carolina (9)	86	Overtime
56	March 4, 1995	Winthrop Coliseum	NC State	71	North Carolina (12)	90	
57	January 17, 1996	Reynolds Coliseum	NC State (11)	76	North Carolina	72	
58	February 18, 1996	Carmichael Auditorium	NC State (16)	65	North Carolina	75	
59	January 23, 1997	Carmichael Auditorium	NC State (17)	66	North Carolina (9)	77	
60	February 17, 1997	Reynolds Coliseum	NC State	84	North Carolina (5)	77	
61	January 22, 1998	Carmichael Auditorium	NC State (8)	64	North Carolina (11)	67	
62	February 22, 1998	Reynolds Coliseum	NC State (10)	60	North Carolina (7)	57	
63	January 7, 1999	Reynolds Coliseum	NC State	87	North Carolina (6)	70	
64	February 7, 1999	Carmichael Auditorium	NC State	79	North Carolina (13)	71	
65	January 3, 2000	Carmichael Auditorium	NC State (3)	79	North Carolina (9)	72	
66	February 3, 2000	Reynolds Coliseum	NC State (11)	96	North Carolina	76	
67	January 14, 2001	Carmichael Auditorium	NC State (19)	77	North Carolina	83	Overtime
68	February 21, 2001	Reynolds Coliseum	NC State (17)	84	North Carolina	73	
69	January 10, 2002	Carmichael Auditorium	NC State	66	North Carolina (17)	63	
70	February 10, 2002	Reynolds Coliseum	NC State	71	North Carolina (24)	80	
71	March 3, 2002	Greensboro Coliseum	NC State	52	North Carolina (19)	58	
72	January 5, 2003	Carmichael Auditorium	NC State	59	North Carolina (11)	80	
73	February 7, 2003	Reynolds Coliseum	NC State	63	North Carolina (7)	66	
74	January 8, 2004	Reynolds Coliseum	NC State	57	North Carolina (13)	58	
75	February 8, 2004	Carmichael Auditorium	NC State	62	North Carolina (12)	54	
76	March 7, 2004	Greensboro Coliseum	NC State	64	North Carolina (4)	75	
77	January 14, 2005	Reynolds Coliseum	NC State	75	North Carolina (9)	77	
78	February 20, 2005	Carmichael Auditorium	NC State (21)	72	North Carolina (8)	75	Overtime
79	January 15, 2006	Reynolds Coliseum	NC State (25)	53	North Carolina (4)	65	
80	February 2, 2006	Carmichael Auditorium	NC State (24)	58	North Carolina (1)	75	
81	March 4, 2006	Greensboro Coliseum	NC State	69	North Carolina (1)	90	
82	January 21, 2007	Carmichael Auditorium	NC State	65	North Carolina (2)	86	
83	February 16, 2007	Reynolds Coliseum	NC State	72	North Carolina (2)	65	
84	March 4, 2007	Greensboro Coliseum	NC State (24)	54	North Carolina (4)	60	
85	January 13, 2008	Reynolds Coliseum	NC State	70	North Carolina (3)	79	
86	February 25, 2008	Carmichael Auditorium	NC State	79	North Carolina (2)	85	
87	January 11, 2009	Dean Smith Center	NC State	66	North Carolina (2)	75	Overtime
88	February 23, 2009	Reynolds Coliseum	NC State	57	North Carolina (9)	74	
89	January 25, 2010	Reynolds Coliseum	NC State	69	North Carolina (12)	81	
90	February 21, 2010	Carmichael Arena	NC State	74	North Carolina	63	
91	January 14, 2011	Carmichael Arena	NC State	76	North Carolina (11)	83	
92	February 21, 2011	Reynolds Coliseum	NC State	88	North Carolina (13)	72	
93	January 22, 2012	Reynolds Coliseum	NC State	50	North Carolina (24)	60	
94	February 19, 2012	Carmichael Arena	NC State	59	North Carolina	68	
95	January 10, 2013	Reynolds Coliseum	NC State	66	North Carolina (11)	70	
96	February 24, 2013	Carmichael Arena	NC State	58	North Carolina (16)	68	
97	January 9, 2014	Carmichael Arena	NC State (20)	70	North Carolina (13)	79	
98	February 16, 2014	Reynolds Coliseum	NC State (10)	82	North Carolina (17)	89	
99	January 4, 2015	Carmichael Arena	NC State	56	North Carolina (9)	72	
100	January 22, 2015	Reynolds Coliseum	NC State	63	North Carolina (12)	67	
101	January 31, 2016	Broughton High School	NC State	78	North Carolina	49	
102	February 21, 2016	Carmichael Arena	NC State	80	North Carolina	66	
103	January 29, 2017	Carmichael Arena	NC State (18)	70	North Carolina	83	
104	February 23, 2017	Reynolds Coliseum	NC State (18)	80	North Carolina	60	
105	January 18, 2018	Carmichael Arena	NC State	66	North Carolina	53	
106	February 11, 2018	Reynolds Coliseum	NC State (23)	73	North Carolina	54	
107	March 1, 2018	Greensboro Coliseum	NC State (23)	77	North Carolina	64	
108	February 3, 2019	Reynolds Coliseum	NC State (7)	51	North Carolina	64	
109	February 24, 2019	Carmichael Arena	NC State (9)	74	North Carolina	69	
110	January 9, 2020	Carmichael Arena	NC State (9)	60	North Carolina	66	
111	January 26, 2020	Reynolds Coliseum	NC State (8)	76	North Carolina	68	
112	February 7, 2021	Carmichael Arena	NC State (4)	69	North Carolina	76	
113	February 21, 2021	Reynolds Coliseum	NC State (4)	82	North Carolina	63	
114	January 6, 2022	Reynolds Coliseum	NC State (5)	72	North Carolina (19)	45	
115	January 30, 2022	Carmichael Arena	NC State (3)	66	North Carolina (20)	58	
116	January 15, 2023	Carmichael Arena	NC State (11)	47	North Carolina (22)	56	
117	February 16, 2023	Reynolds Coliseum	NC State	77	North Carolina (19)	66	Overtime
118	February 1, 2024	Reynolds Coliseum	NC State (5)	63	North Carolina (24)	59	
119	February 22, 2024	Carmichael Arena	NC State (6)	70	North Carolina	80	
120	February 16, 2025	Carmichael Arena	NC State (10)	65	North Carolina (12)	66	
121	March 8, 2025	Greensboro Coliseum	NC State (7)	66	North Carolina (14)	55	
122	February 2, 2026	Reynolds Coliseum	NC State	59	North Carolina (25)	61	
Series: NC State leads 65–57

== Baseball all-time series records ==
=== All-time series record ===
- North Carolina: 168; NC State: 135; Ties: 1
- As of May, 2019

=== ACC regular season championships ===
- North Carolina: 13 (1960, 1964, 1966, 1969, 1980, 1983, 1984, 1989, 1990, 2006, 2007, 2009, 2013)
- NC State: 4 (1968, 1975, 1981, 1986)

=== ACC Tournament championships ===
- North Carolina: 8 (1982,1983,1984, 1990, 2007, 2013, 2019, 2022)
- NC State: 4 (1973, 1974, 1975, 1992)

=== College World Series appearances ===
- North Carolina: 13 (1960, 1966, 1978, 1989, 2006, 2007, 2008, 2009, 2011, 2013, 2018, 2024, 2026)
- NC State: 4 (1968, 2013, 2021, 2024)

=== College World Series victories ===
- North Carolina: 16
- NC State: 5

=== NCAA championship game/series appearances ===
- North Carolina: 3 (2006, 2007, 2026)
- NC State: 0

== Men's soccer all-time series records ==
=== All-time series record (1950-Present) ===
- North Carolina: 52; NC State: 22; Ties: 13
- As of February, 2024

=== ACC regular season championships ===
- North Carolina: 4 (2000, 2011, 2012, 2016)
- NC State: 1 (1994)

=== ACC tournament championships ===
- North Carolina: 3 (1987, 2000, 2011)
- NC State: 1 (1990)

=== College Cup appearances ===
- North Carolina: 8 (1987, 2001, 2008, 2009, 2010, 2011, 2016, 2017)
- NC State: 2 (1990, 2025)

=== NCAA championships ===
- North Carolina: 2 (2001, 2011)
- NC State: 0

== Wrestling all-time series records ==
=== All-time series record (1955-present) ===
- NC State: 52; UNC: 51; Ties: 2
- (As of February 7, 2024)

=== ACC Championships ===
- NC State: 21
  - (1976, 1978, 1981, 1982, 1983, 1988, 1989, 1990, 1991, 1996, 2001, 2002, 2004, 2007, 2016, 2019, 2020, 2021, 2022, 2023, 2024)
- UNC: 17
  - (1979, 1980, 1984, 1985, 1986, 1987, 1992, 1993, 1994, 1995, 1997, 1998, 1999, 2000, 2003, 2005, 2006)

=== All-Americans ===
- NC State: 30
  - (Jim Zenz, Matt Reiss, Chris Wentz, Frank Castrignano, Tab Thacker, Chris Mondragon, Scott Turner, Marc Sodano, Mike Lombardo, Michael Stokes, Brian Jackson, Chris Kwortnik, Sylvester Terkay, Steve Williams, Mike Miller, Darrion Caldwell, Darrius Little, Nick Gwiazdowski, Kevin Jack, Tommy Gantt, Pete Renda, Tariq Wilson, Hayden Hidlay, Michael Macchiavello, Trent Hidlay, Jakob Camacho, Thomas Bullard, Daniel Bullard, Kai Orine, Ed Scott)
- UNC: 23
  - (C.D. Mock, Dave Cook, Jan Michaels, Bob Monaghan, Mike Elinsky, Rob Koll, Bobby Shriner, Tad Wilson, Al Palacio, Lenny Bernstein, Doug Wyland, Enzo Catullo, Pete Welch, Shane Camera, Jody Staylor, Marc Taylor, Stan Banks, Justin Harty, Evan Sola, Chris Rodrigues, Evan Henderson, Ethan Ramos, Joey Ward)

=== NCAA Champions (individual) ===
- NC State: 7
  - Matt Reiss (1980)
  - Tab Thacker (1984)
  - Scott Turner (1988)
  - Sylvester Terkay (1993)
  - Darrion Caldwell (2009)
  - Nick Gwiazdowski (2014, 2015)
  - Michael Macchiavello (2018)
- UNC: 4
  - C.D. Mock (1982)
  - Rob Koll (1988)
  - T.J. Jaworsky (1993, 1994, 1995)
  - Austin O'Connor (2021, 2023)

=== NCAA Championships (team) ===
- NC State: 0
- UNC: 0
Complete List of Scores (1955-Present)

=== Scores of games (1955–Present) ===
NC State victories	North Carolina victories

No.	Date	Location	NC State		North Carolina		Notes
1	1955		NC State	27	North Carolina	13	
Series: NC State leads 1–0

== Gymnastics all-time series records ==
=== Series record (1981-present) ===
- NC State: 82; UNC: 52; Ties: 1
- (As of February 12, 2024)

=== Conference Championships ===
- NC State: 8
  - ACC: 2 (1984, 2024)
  - EAGL: 6 (1999, 2000, 2007, 2009, 2013, 2018)
- UNC: 5
  - ACC: 0
  - EAGL: 5 (2002, 2005, 2006, 2010, 2011)

=== NCAA Champions (individual) ===
- NC State: 0
- UNC: 1 (Courtney Bumpers)

=== NCAA Championships (team) ===
- Semi-Finalists
  - NC State: 1
  - UNC: 0
- Finalists
  - NC State: 0
  - UNC: 0
- Champions
  - NC State: 0
  - UNC: 0
Complete List of Meets (1981-Present)

=== Scores of meets (1981–Present) ===
NC State victories	UNC victories

No.	Date	Location	NC State		UNC		Notes
1	02/17/1981	NCSU	NC State	133.850	UNC	136.800	
2	02/03/1982	NCSU	NC State	127.900	UNC	133.500	
3	02/23/1982	UNC	NC State	128.500	UNC	135.250	
4	02/19/1983	UNC	NC State	167.050	UNC	171.150	
5	03/05/1983	NCSU	NC State	175.650	UNC	170.350	
6	03/12/1983	NCSU	NC State	170.950	UNC	167.750	
7	01/20/1984	James Madison	NC State	159.600	UNC	159.100	
8	01/27/1984	UNC	NC State	163.200	UNC	167.500	
9	02/24/1984	UNC	NC State	175.250	UNC	174.650	
10	03/18/1984	NCSU	NC State	174.250	UNC	171.400	
11	01/26/1985	NCSU	NC State	141.550	UNC	171.250	
12	02/23/1985	Maryland	NC State	157.200	UNC	182.000	
13	03/02/1985	Georgia	NC State	131.550	UNC	178.650	
14	01/15/1986	UNC	NC State	166.350	UNC	183.100	
15	02/21/1986	NCSU	NC State	173.050	UNC	182.350	
16	01/24/1987	UNC	NC State	174.600	UNC	176.650	
17	02/14/1987	NCSU	NC State	177.050	UNC	175.050	
18	03/28/1987	UNC	NC State	180.400	UNC	179.850	
19	02/24/1988	NCSU	NC State	177.550	UNC	180.050	
20	04/02/1988	UNC	NC State	177.550	UNC	180.050	
21	02/08/1989	NCSU	NC State	182.300	UNC	181.900	
22	03/18/1989	NCSU	NC State	188.150	UNC	185.750	
23	03/24/1989	UNC	NC State	188.850	UNC	187.150	
24	02/10/1990	UNC	NC State	180.650	UNC	180.700	
25	03/23/1990	UNC	NC State	184.750	UNC	177.200	
26	03/30/1990	NCSU	NC State	182.800	UNC	179.850	
27	02/22/1991	NCSU	NC State	185.750	UNC	184.450	
28	03/15/1991	NCSU	NC State	183.550	UNC	185.350	
29	03/22/1991	NCSU	NC State	188.250	UNC	189.000	
30	02/14/1992	Hearts Invitational	NC State	190.250	UNC	185.450	
31	03/20/1992	NCSU	NC State	190.350	UNC	187.400	
32	03/27/1992	UNC	NC State	186.800	UNC	187.100	
33	02/12/1993	Hearts Invitational	NC State	188.800	UNC	185.300	
34	03/06/1993	Bubble Invitational	NC State	190.400	UNC	186.500	
35	03/20/1993	UNC	NC State	190.550	UNC	188.450	
36	03/12/1994	Bubble Invitational	NC State	191.425	UNC	186.200	
37	03/25/1994	UNC	NC State	186.920	UNC	187.920	
38	01/22/1995	William & Mary	NC State	186.150	UNC	181.250	
39	03/04/1995	Bubble Invitational	NC State	192.275	UNC	185.725	
40	03/25/1995	ACC Invitational	NC State	192.725	UNC	187.775	
41	02/09/1996	Hearts Invitational	NC State	192.600	UNC	188.300	
42	03/23/1996	ACC Invitational	NC State	193.750	UNC	190.575	
43	03/30/1996	West Virginia	NC State	192.300	UNC	189.300	
44	02/09/1997	UNC	NC State	190.200	UNC	192.825	
45	03/22/1997	NCSU	NC State	195.100	UNC	192.325	
46	02/07/1998	Maryland	NC State	192.125	UNC	190.650	
47	02/13/1998	Hearts Invitational	NC State	194.325	UNC	190.450	
48	03/21/1998	Rutgers	NC State	193.825	UNC	190.975	
49	02/07/1999	NCSU	NC State	193.550	UNC	193.325	
50	03/15/1999	ITG Travel Invitational	NC State	194.925	UNC	193.175	
51	03/27/1999	Maryland	NC State	196.050	UNC	194.675	
52	02/04/2000	Towson	NC State	193.750	UNC	191.525	
53	03/11/2000	NCSU	NC State	197.725	UNC	193.450	
54	03/18/2000	Pittsburgh	NC State	196.000	UNC	194.475	
55	02/03/2001	UNC	NC State	192.700	UNC	194.450	
56	02/09/2001	Hearts Invitational	NC State	195.150	UNC	193.025	
57	02/17/2001	NCSU	NC State	196.150	UNC	195.075	
58	03/24/2001	UNC	NC State	193.275	UNC	193.325	
59	02/02/2002	Maryland	NC State	194.825	UNC	194.675	
60	03/01/2002	NCSU	NC State	195.550	UNC	196.150	
61	03/23/2002	Towson	NC State	194.725	UNC	196.425	
62	02/08/2003	NCSU	NC State	195.675	UNC	196.775	
63	02/28/2003	NCSU	NC State	196.100	UNC	195.300	
64	03/29/2003	New Hampshire	NC State	196.750	UNC	196.025	
65	03/12/2003	Georgia	NC State	193.575	UNC	194.900	
66	02/07/2004	Towson	NC State	195.225	UNC	195.975	
67	02/13/2004	Hearts Invitational	NC State	195.975	UNC	196.725	
68	02/22/2004	UNC	NC State	195.725	UNC	197.325	
69	03/05/2004	NCSU	NC State	196.950	UNC	197.025	
70	03/20/2004	Pittsburgh	NC State	196.600	UNC	196.725	
71	03/03/2004	NCSU	NC State	194.375	UNC	196.350	
72	02/05/2005	UNC	NC State	193.025	UNC	193.225	
73	02/25/2005	NCSU	NC State	194.475	UNC	194.475	
74	02/27/2005	UNC	NC State	195.500	UNC	195.025	
75	03/25/2005	NCSU	NC State	194.975	UNC	195.975	
76	04/09/2005	Florida	NC State	193.575	UNC	194.075	
77	02/04/2006	Maryland	NC State	192.250	UNC	195.050	
78	02/24/2006	NCSU	NC State	193.625	UNC	193.375	
79	02/26/2006	UNC	NC State	195.700	UNC	194.350	
80	03/25/2006	Rutgers	NC State	195.075	UNC	195.325	
81	04/08/2006	Georgia	NC State	193.925	UNC	194.300	
82	02/02/2007	NCSU	NC State	194.600	UNC	194.200	
83	02/11/2007	UNC	NC State	193.975	UNC	194.525	
84	03/25/2007	Maryland	NC State	195.475	UNC	194.925	
85	04/14/2007	West Virginia	NC State	193.950	UNC	193.875	
86	02/01/2008	Towson	NC State	192.750	UNC	194.000	
87	02/10/2008	UNC	NC State	194.975	UNC	195.450	
88	03/14/2008	NCSU	NC State	194.850	UNC	193.500	
89	03/29/2008	West Virginia	NC State	195.475	UNC	193.950	
90	04/12/2008	Florida	NC State	193.825	UNC	191.825	
91	02/07/2009	NCSU	NC State	194.950	UNC	194.450	
92	02/13/2009	Sweetheart Invitational	NC State	194.350	UNC	193.535	
93	03/21/2009	NCSU	NC State	195.700	UNC	194.825	
94	04/04/2009	NCSU	NC State	193.800	UNC	194.125	
95	02/20/2010	Sweetheart Invitational	NC State	195.575	UNC	193.875	
96	03/27/2010	New Hampshire	NC State	195.700	UNC	196.025	
97	03/19/2011	George Washington	NC State	193.450	UNC	195.300	
98	03/24/2012	Pittsburgh	NC State	196.000	UNC	195.550	
99	04/07/2012	NCSU	NC State	195.975	UNC	194.025	
100	02/16/2013	NCSU	NC State	195.675	UNC	195.550	
101	02/22/2013	UNC	NC State	194.875	UNC	195.050	
102	03/23/2013	UNC	NC State	195.175	UNC	194.225	
103	01/09/2014	UNC	NC State	193.950	UNC	194.075	
104	01/17/2014	NCSU	NC State	195.650	UNC	192.450	
105	02/15/2014	NCSU	NC State	196.050	UNC	193.650	
106	03/22/2014	New Hampshire	NC State	195.275	UNC	194.150	
107	01/31/2015	NCSU	NC State	194.050	UNC	194.550	
108	02/20/2015	NCSU	NC State	194.625	UNC	194.950	
109	03/22/2015	Towson	NC State	195.225	UNC	194.825	
110	02/06/2016	UNC	NC State	194.900	UNC	193.400	
111	02/12/2016	UNC	NC State	194.050	UNC	193.000	
112	03/19/2016	Pittsburgh	NC State	194.500	UNC	194.975	
113	02/10/2017	NCSU	NC State	195.025	UNC	195.675	
114	03/18/2017	NCSU	NC State	194.875	UNC	194.525	
115	01/12/2018	UNC	NC State	194.650	UNC	194.375	
116	02/17/2018	NCSU	NC State	196.575	UNC	196.050	
117	03/24/2018	Towson	NC State	196.625	UNC	194.775	
118	01/25/2019	UNC	NC State	195.200	UNC	194.650	
119	02/16/2019	NCSU	NC State	195.850	UNC	193.700	
120	03/23/2019	New Hampshire	NC State	195.275	UNC	193.950	
121	03/24/2019	Towson	NC State	196.625	UNC	194.775	
122	01/17/2020	Kentucky	NC State	194.425	UNC	194.625	
123	02/01/2020	NCSU	NC State	196.250	UNC	193.375	
124	02/15/2020	NCSU	NC State	194.950	UNC	194.600	
125	02/06/2021	NCSU	NC State	196.025	UNC	195.600	
126	02/12/2021	UNC	NC State	195.025	UNC	195.300	
127	02/27/2021	NCSU	NC State	196.200	UNC	195.000	
128	03/07/2021	Pittsburgh	NC State	196.050	UNC	195.275	
129	01/15/2022	Rutgers	NC State	195.125	UNC	194.225	
130	03/19/2022	George Washington	NC State	195.625	UNC	195.550	
131	01/09/2023	UNC	NC State	195.525	UNC	196.325	
132	02/04/2023	NCSU	NC State	196.275	UNC	195.975	
133	03/18/2023	New Hampshire	NC State	196.425	UNC	196.350	
134	01/19/2024	UNC	NC State	196.225	UNC	195.325	
135	02/11/2024	NCSU	NC State	196.725	UNC	194.925	
136	03/23/2024	Greensboro Coliseum	NC State	197.550	UNC	196.300	
Series: NC State leads 83–52–1
