= Bubble Wrap (brand) =

Trademarked brand

- Current owner: Sealed Air Corporation
- Introduced: 1960
- Website: www.sealedair.com/products/brand/bubblewrap-brand

Bubble Wrap (originally Air Cap) is a trademarked brand of Sealed Air Corporation that includes numerous cushioning products made from bubble wrap. The brand is produced by the Product Care division of Sealed Air. Both the Bubble Wrap brand and the product were introduced in 1960, with the launch of Sealed Air. Although the brand was originally used for the packaging of IBM computers, Sealed Air now does most of its Bubble Wrap business in the food packaging industry.

== History ==
Bubble wrap was invented in 1957 by engineers Alfred Fielding and Marc Chavannes in Hawthorne, New Jersey. Fielding and Chavannes sealed two shower curtains together, creating a smattering of air bubbles, which they originally tried to sell as wallpaper. When the product turned out to be unsuccessful as wallpaper, the team sold it as greenhouse insulation.

Although Bubble Wrap was branded by Sealed Air Corporation (founded by Fielding and Chavannes) in 1960, it was not until a year later (1961) that its usefulness in protective usage was discovered. As a packaging material, Bubble Wrap's first client was IBM, which used the product to protect the IBM 1401 computer during shipment. Fielding and Chavannes were inducted into the New Jersey Inventors Hall of Fame in 1993. Sealed Air celebrated Bubble Wrap's 50th birthday in January 2010.

== Uses ==
The Annual Bubble Wrap Competition For Young Inventors was hosted by Sealed Air from 2006 to 2008, in which children were encouraged to design products made out of bubble wrap that had uses outside of the packaging industry. Inventions included a "Bubble Wrap Car Door Cover", a "Bubble Wrap Cushy Wheelchair", and "Transformable Bubble Wrap Kite".

Popping Bubble Wrap is sometimes used as stress-relief, and Sealed Air's corporate offices have "stress relief boxes" that are filled with Bubble Wrap for the employees to pop.
