= Sealed Air =

American packaging company

Sealed Air Corporation
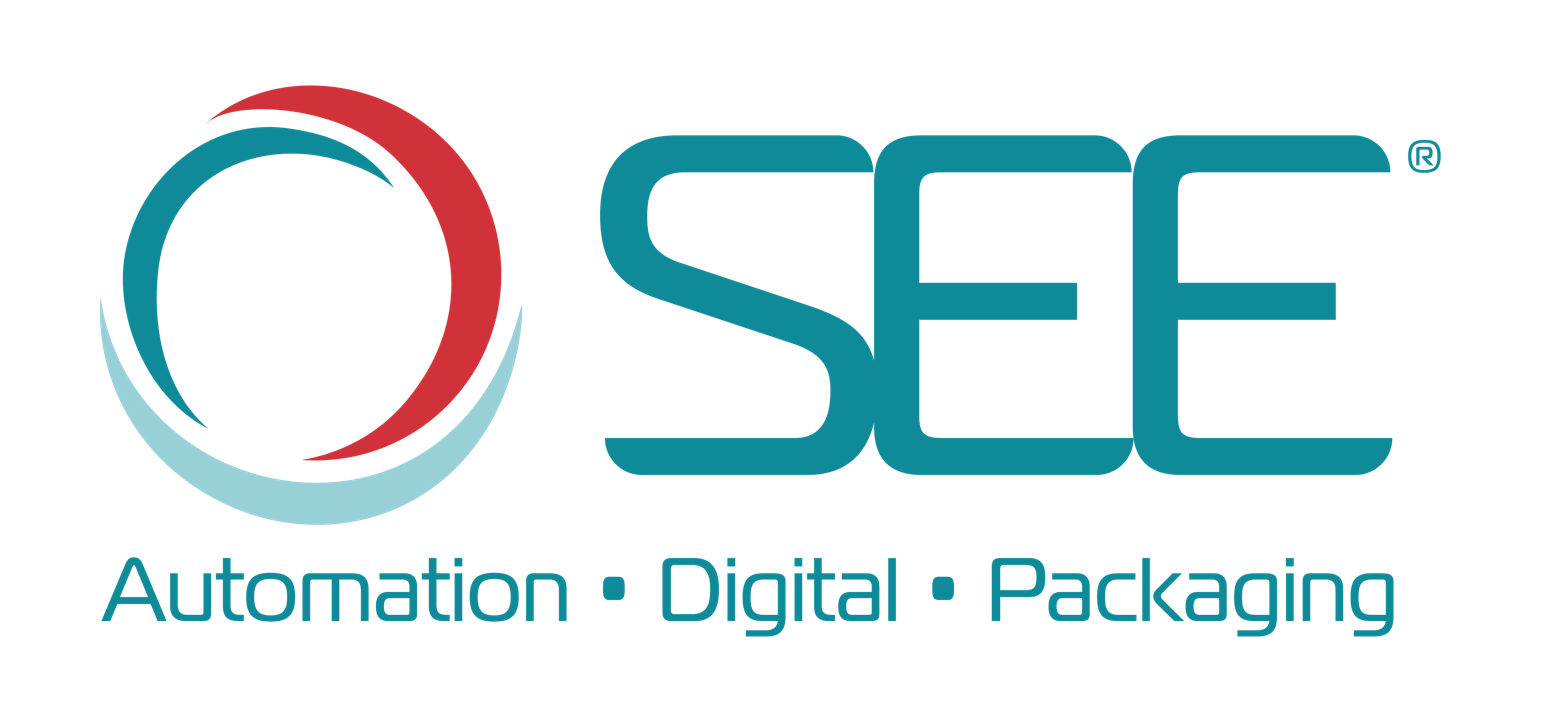
- Logo from rebrand in 2023

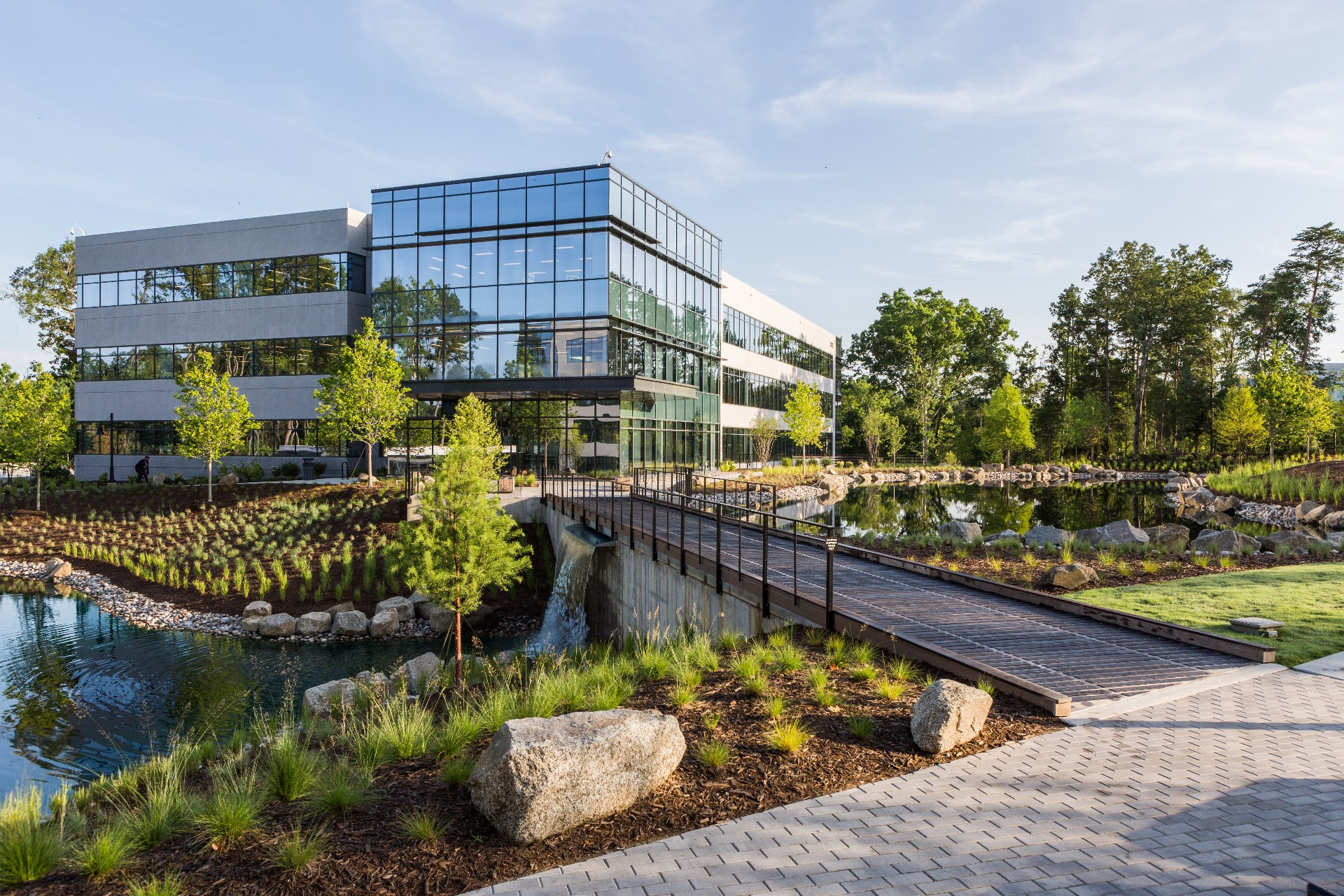
- SEE headquarters in Charlotte, North Carolina
- Trade name: SEE
- Type: Private
- Traded as: NYSE: SEE
- Industry: Packaging
- Founded: 1960; 66 years ago in Saddle Brook, New Jersey, U.S.
- Founders: Alfred W. Fielding; Marc Chavannes
- Headquarters: Charlotte, North Carolina, U.S.
- Number of locations: 200+
- Area served: Global
- Key people: Dustin Semach (CEO)
- Brands: Bubble Wrap; Cryovac; Autobag; Sealed Air; Liquibox; Nexcel; prismiq
- Revenue: ▼US$5.39 billion (2024)
- Operating income: ▼US$736 million (2024)
- Net income: ▼US$265 million (2024)
- Total assets: ▼US$7.02 billion (2024)
- Total equity: ▲US$625 million (2024)
- Number of employees: 16,400 (2024)
- Parent: Clayton, Dubilier & Rice
- Website: sealedair.com

Sealed Air Corporation is an American packaging company known for its Cryovac food packaging and Bubble Wrap cushioning packaging. It is headquartered in Charlotte, North Carolina, United States, and led by Dustin Semach, president and CEO. The company had $5.4 billion in revenues in 2024.

In November 2025, private equity firm Clayton, Dubilier & Rice agreed to acquire the company for a total enterprise value of $10.3 billion. This was completed on April 9, 2026.

== History ==
In 1957, American engineer Alfred W. Fielding and Swiss inventor Marc Chavannes sought to invent plastic wallpaper with a paper backing. While the wallpaper failed, Fielding and Chavannes realized that their invention could be a packing material. Sealed Air was founded in 1960 based on this invention of Bubble Wrap. The same year, Sealed Air raised $85,000 (equivalent to $930,000 in 2025) in its initial public offering. Fielding was executive vice president and a director of Sealed Air until his retirement in 1987, while Chavannes worked mostly as a consultant.

Shortly after a 1998 business restructuring of the global conglomerate W.R. Grace Company-Conn, the original Sealed Air was merged into Grace subsidiary W. R. Grace & Co. NY, and the surviving company was named W. R. Grace & Co. Soon this W.R. Grace & Co renamed itself Sealed Air, the name of the current entity, but now a vastly larger corporation due to the Grace components. Years later, in 2002, this Sealed Air Corporation was required to pay to W. R. Grace Company-Conn $728 million to settle bankruptcy and fraud allegations brought against the original merger. T.J. Dermot Dunphy was CEO from 1971 to 2000. An Oxford University graduate who received his MBA from Harvard Business School, he became chairman of Kildare Enterprises, LLC in November 2000 after leaving Sealed Air. During his tenure at Sealed Air, sales grew from $5 million to $3 billion.

William Hickey was CEO from 2000 to March 2013. He previously worked in several capacities at Sealed Air, including COO, executive vice president, CFO, vice president, and general manager of the Food Packaging Division and the Cellu Products Division. Before working for Sealed Air, he was CPA at Arthur Young and CFO of W. R. Grace and Company's Latin American operations.

After the Station nightclub fire in 2003, victims' lawyers suggested that Sealed Air had produced some of the foam that was ignited in the fire. Sealed Air paid $25 million to victims in civil settlements, but did not admit wrongdoing.

In March 2013, Jérôme Péribère took over as CEO and president of Sealed Air. He obtained his business economics and finance degree from Sciences Po in Paris, France. He previously was president and COO of Sealed Air before taking over as CEO, and prior to joining Sealed Air, he worked in several managerial roles with the Dow Chemical Company from 1977 to 2012.

On July 23, 2014, Sealed Air announced that it would be moving its global headquarters to Charlotte, North Carolina. In January 2018, Ted Doheny took over as CEO.

In May 2023, the corporation announced that it would adopt the corporate brand SEE, while retaining the legal name of Sealed Air Corporation.

In October 2023, Ted Doheny stepped down as CEO. Emile Chammas, Chief Operating Officer and Dustin Semach, Chief Financial Officer were interim co-Presidents and co-CEOs.

In November 2025, private equity firm Clayton, Dubilier & Rice agreed to acquire the company for a total enterprise value of $10.3 billion. The acquisition was completed on April 9, 2026 with Sealed Air becoming a privately held company and its shares ceased trading on the New York Stock Exchange.

== Acquisitions ==
In 1970, Sealed Air acquired Smith Packaging Ltd., which was later renamed Sealed Air of Canada, Ltd., marking Sealed Air's first international move. In 1971, Sealed Air began marketing a new product; by laminating the AirCap cushioning to paper, the company now had Mail Lite padded shipping envelopes.

In 1973, Sealed Air began marketing Ply-Mask, a pressure-sensitive polyethylene film used to protect delicate surfaces from scratches and the company's first product not based on its bubble technology. The same year, Sealed Air brought their market to Europe by acquiring 10 percent of Sibco Universal, S.A., a French manufacturing firm. Over the next few years, Sealed Air bought out the rest of Sibco and came up with the Sealed Air Solar Blanket.

Acquired in 1977, Instapak foam is an expanding polyurethane foam that comes in a variety of densities. Used primarily for shipping, the foam-in-bag process molds to the shape of the object and expands to fill the void space of its shipping container.

Sealed Air acquired Cellu Products Co. and Dri-Loc in 1983, Jiffy in 1987, Sentinel in 1991, Trigon Packaging NZ in 1993, and the Shurtuff Division of Shuford Mills, Inc. in 1993. In 1994, Sealed Air followed up with the further acquisitions of Hereford Paper and Allied Products Ltd., Sup-Air-Pack, Fill Air, and packaging companies based in Norway, France, and Italy.

In 1998, Sealed Air was acquired and merged with the Cryovac Division of W.R. Grace for a $4.9 billion stock trade, and spun off from the Grace parent holding company as W. R. Grace, Inc. That corporation changed its name to the current Sealed Air. In June 2000, Sealed Air purchased Dolphin Packaging for $119 million, to better serve its European customers. In October 2011, Sealed Air acquired Diversey Holdings, until its acquisition by Bain Capital in September 2017.

In October 2017, Sealed Air acquired Fagerdala Singapore Pte Ltd., a manufacturer and fabricator of polyethylene foam.

In August 2018, Sealed Air acquired Austin Foam Plastics (AFP, Inc.), a leading, privately held fabricator of foam, corrugated, molded pulp and wood packaging solutions. Sealed Air Acquires Austin Foam Plastics

In February 2023, Sealed Air acquired Liquibox, a manufacturer of Bag-in-Box sustainable fluids & liquids packaging and dispensing solutions for fresh food, beverage, consumer goods and industrial end-markets. Liquibox Acquisition

== Operations ==
Sealed Air's food care division makes packaging for the food and beverage industry, while its product care division produces protective and specialty packaging materials for a wide range of goods.

=== Brands ===
==== Bubble Wrap brand ====
Bubble Wrap is a failed wallpaper that was subsequently used as a greenhouse insulator. Its best-known use is as a packaging material. In its earliest form, Bubble Wrap's bubbles leaked, but by the mid 1960s a coating was developed to prevent them from losing air. In 1969, Sealed Air reported $4 million in sales, mostly attributed to Bubble Wrap, as it was still a proprietary product at that time.

==== Cryovac brand ====
Cryovac is a thin plastic, used to shrink or wrap objects. Depending on the type of job required of it, the plastic comes in a variety of thickness and durability.

One of the uses of Cryovac is to wrap food. Once wrapped, most of the air in the package is removed to prevent oxidation and inhibit the growth of most pathogens. This process also gives food a longer shelf life in the refrigerator or freezer and makes freezer burn nearly impossible. Cryovac Inc., a South Carolina-based company, created this product in the 1950 to extend the shipping distance of freshly slaughtered turkeys for Thanksgiving and Christmas.
