= Caldwell Community College & Technical Institute =

Public college in Hudson, North Carolina, US

- Type: Public Community college
- Established: 1964
- Parent institution: North Carolina Community College System
- President: Mark Poarch
- Students: Enrollment Varies
- Location: Hudson, North Carolina, United States; 35.853°N 81.4832°W
- Campus: Rural
- Colors: Navy, orange
- Nickname: The Cobras
- Sporting affiliations: NJCAA, (CJCC)
- Website: www.cccti.edu

Caldwell Community College and Technical Institute (CCC&TI) is a public community college in Hudson, North Carolina. It serves residents of Caldwell and Watauga counties. CCC&TI is part of the North Carolina Community College System.

CCC&TI offers two full-service campuses, one in Hudson, North Carolina, and another in Boone, North Carolina. Additional college facilities include: the Transportation and Public Services Center in Hudson, the J.E. Broyhill Civic Center in Lenoir and the Broyhill House in Lenoir.

CCC&TI is accredited by the Commission on Colleges of the Southern Association of Colleges and Schools to award associate degrees.

== History ==
In 1964, the college first opened its doors as Caldwell Technical Institute with the employment of Dr. H. Edwin Beam as its first president. Health occupations courses were offered in 1965, with the college's first facilities occupied in 1967. Three years later, the institution's name was changed to Caldwell Community College and Technical Institute as the college transfer program was implemented.

CCC&TI's second president, Dr. Eric B. McKeithan, was appointed in 1984. Dr. Kenneth A. Boham took the reins as president in 1995 and retired as president in 2016. Caldwell County native Dr. Mark Poarch was named president in 2016, becoming the institution's fourth president.

Also on campus is Caldwell Early College High School, where students can get their high school diploma and an associate degree at the same time. The campus also houses the Caldwell Applied Sciences Academy, formerly known as the Caldwell Career Center Middle College.

CCC&TI offers over 100 curriculum programs and a variety of continuing education options. The Watauga Campus of the college lies 3 miles (5 km) from the campus of Appalachian State University in Boone.

== Arts ==
From 1984 to 1988, CCC&TI housed and sponsored the Unifour Jazz Ensemble, and were the 1987 Community College Jazz Ensemble national champions. In 1990, UJE was named Community Jazz Ensemble of the 1980s by the International Association for Jazz Education, and in 2013, its director Tom Smith was inducted into the Down Beat Jazz Education Hall of Fame.

== Athletics ==
The college sports teams compete in the National Junior College Athletic Association (NJCAA) in men's basketball, baseball, women's volleyball and softball, using the mascot and nickname "Cobras".

Baseball alumni Bo Davidson reached the major leagues with the San Francisco Giants in 2026.
