= Dula-Horton Cemetery =

Historic cemetery in Caldwell County, North Carolina, US

- U.S. National Register of Historic Places
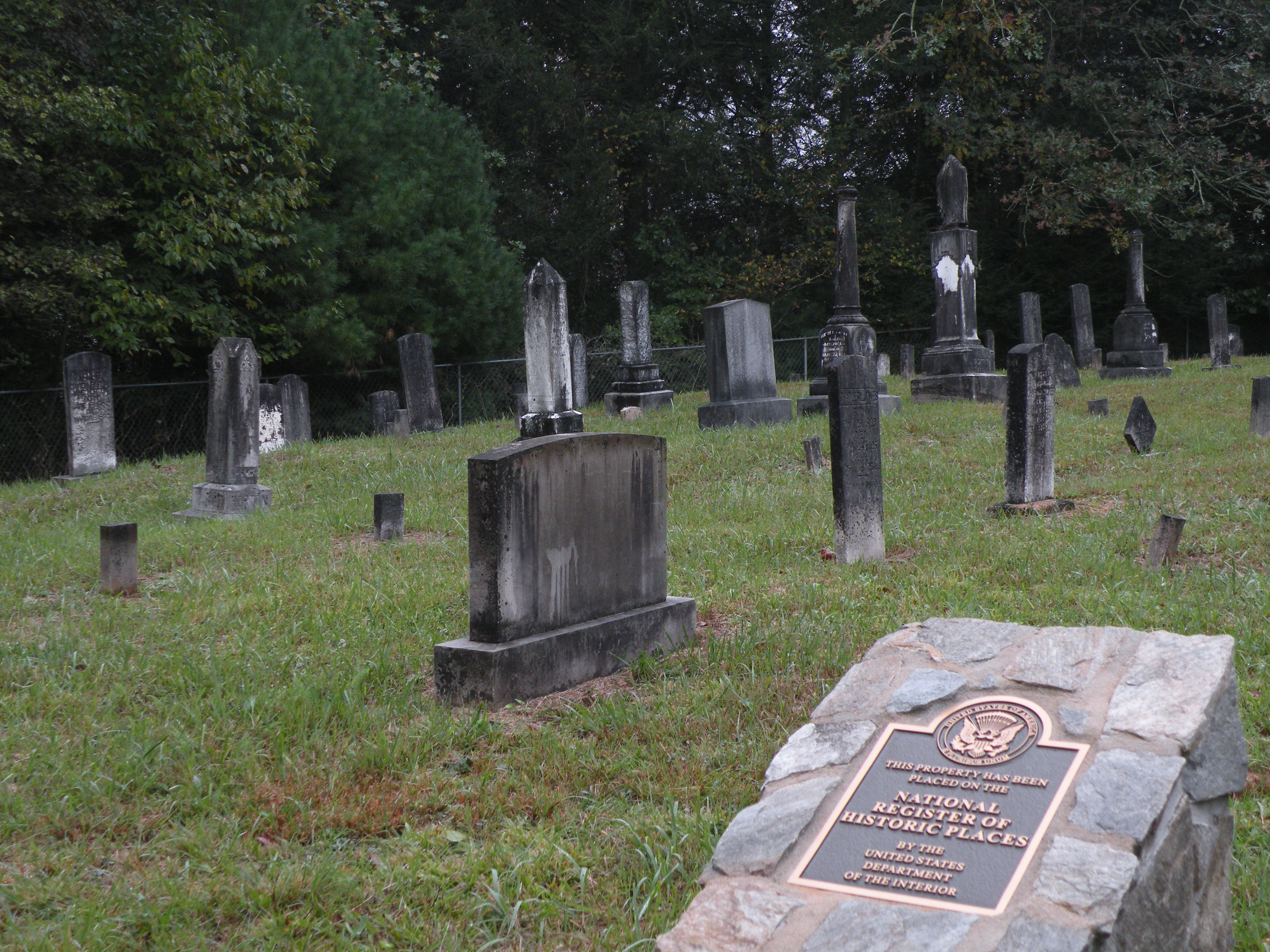
- Dula-Horton Cemetery, September 2012

- Location within North Carolina Location within the United States
- Location: End of an 0.25 mile Ln, off S side of NC 268, 1.4 miles E of jct. with Grandin Rd., near Grandin, North Carolina
- Coordinates: 36°3′45″N 81°24′56″W
- Area: 1 acre (0.40 ha)
- Built: 1835
- NRHP reference No.: 04000941
- Added to NRHP: September 2, 2004

Dula-Horton Cemetery is a historic family cemetery located near Grandin, Caldwell County, North Carolina. It was established in 1835, and has been the site of interments for five generations (68 members) of the extended Dula-Horton family and their Jones family kinsmen. William Horton Bower (1850–1910), North Carolina Congressman from Lenoir, is buried there.

The cemetery was listed on the National Register of Historic Places in 2004.
