= Patterson, North Carolina =

- Unincorporated community
- Location within North Carolina Location within the United States
- Coordinates: 35°59′57″N 81°33′50″W
- Country: United States
- State: North Carolina
- County: Caldwell
- Elevation: 1,257 ft (383 m)
- Time zone: UTC-5 (Eastern (EST))
  - Summer (DST): UTC-4 (EDT)
- ZIP code: 28661
- Area code: 828
- GNIS feature ID: 1014252

Patterson is an unincorporated community in Caldwell County, North Carolina, United States. Patterson is located near U.S. Route 321, 6 miles (9.7 km) north-northwest of Lenoir. Patterson has a post office with ZIP code 28661.

Clover Hill was listed on the National Register of Historic Places in 1973.
