= Walter James Lenoir House =

Historic house in North Carolina, United States

- U.S. National Register of Historic Places
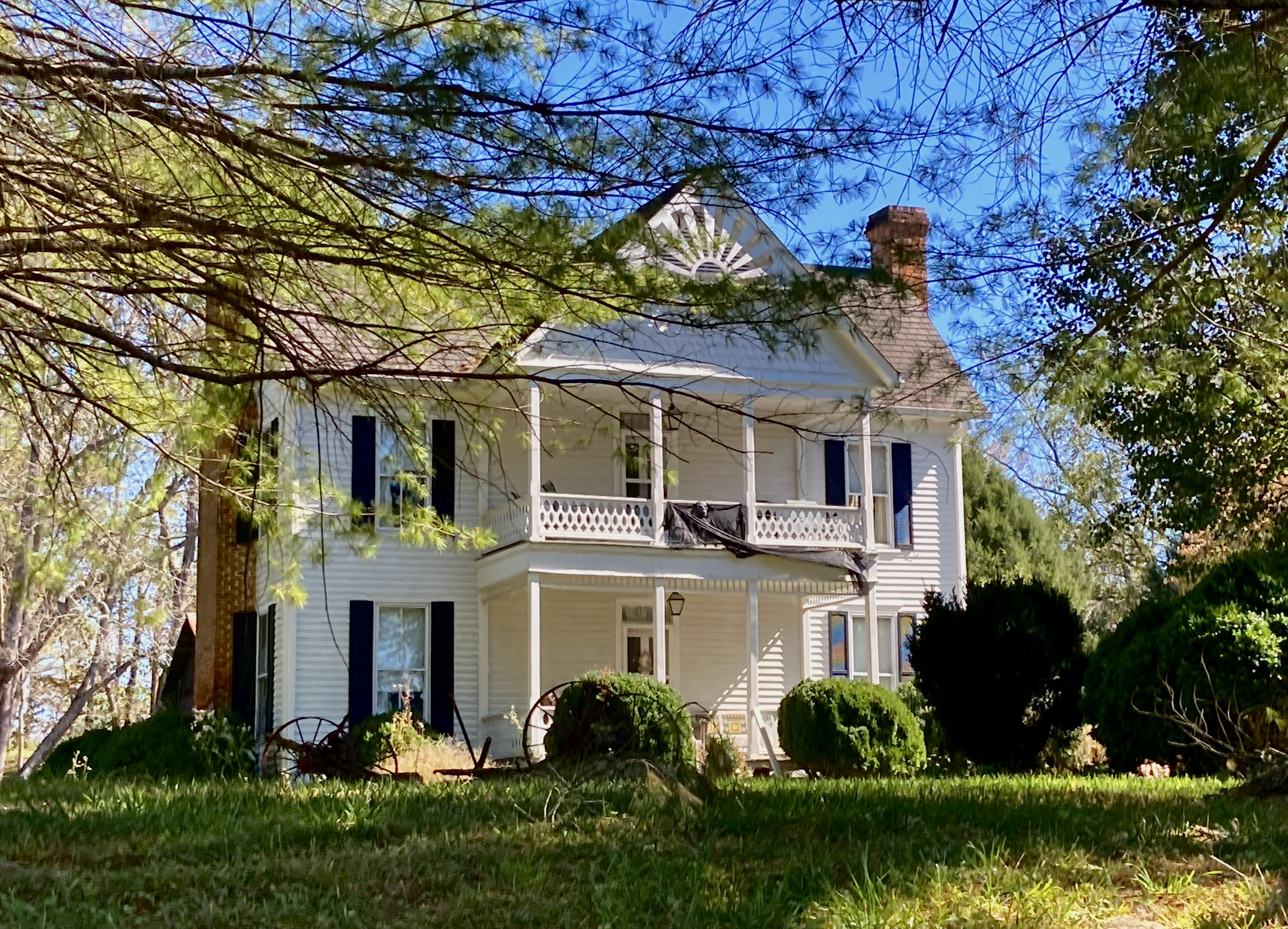

- Location within North Carolina Location within the United States
- Location: NC 268, 0.3 miles E of jct. with NC 1513, near Yadkin Valley, North Carolina
- Coordinates: 36°0′56″N 81°30′12″W
- Area: 6.4 acres (2.6 ha)
- Built: 1893
- Architectural style: Late Victorian, Folk Victorian
- NRHP reference No.: 04000938
- Added to NRHP: September 2, 2004

Walter James Lenoir House is a historic home located near Yadkin Valley, Caldwell County, North Carolina. It was built in 1893, and is a two-story, T-shaped, frame I-house with late Victorian decorative detailing. It has a two-story rear ell and two-tier, gabled porch.

The house was listed on the National Register of Historic Places in 2004.
