= Carolina and Northwestern Railway Freight Station =

Historic district in North Carolina, United States

- U.S. National Register of Historic Places
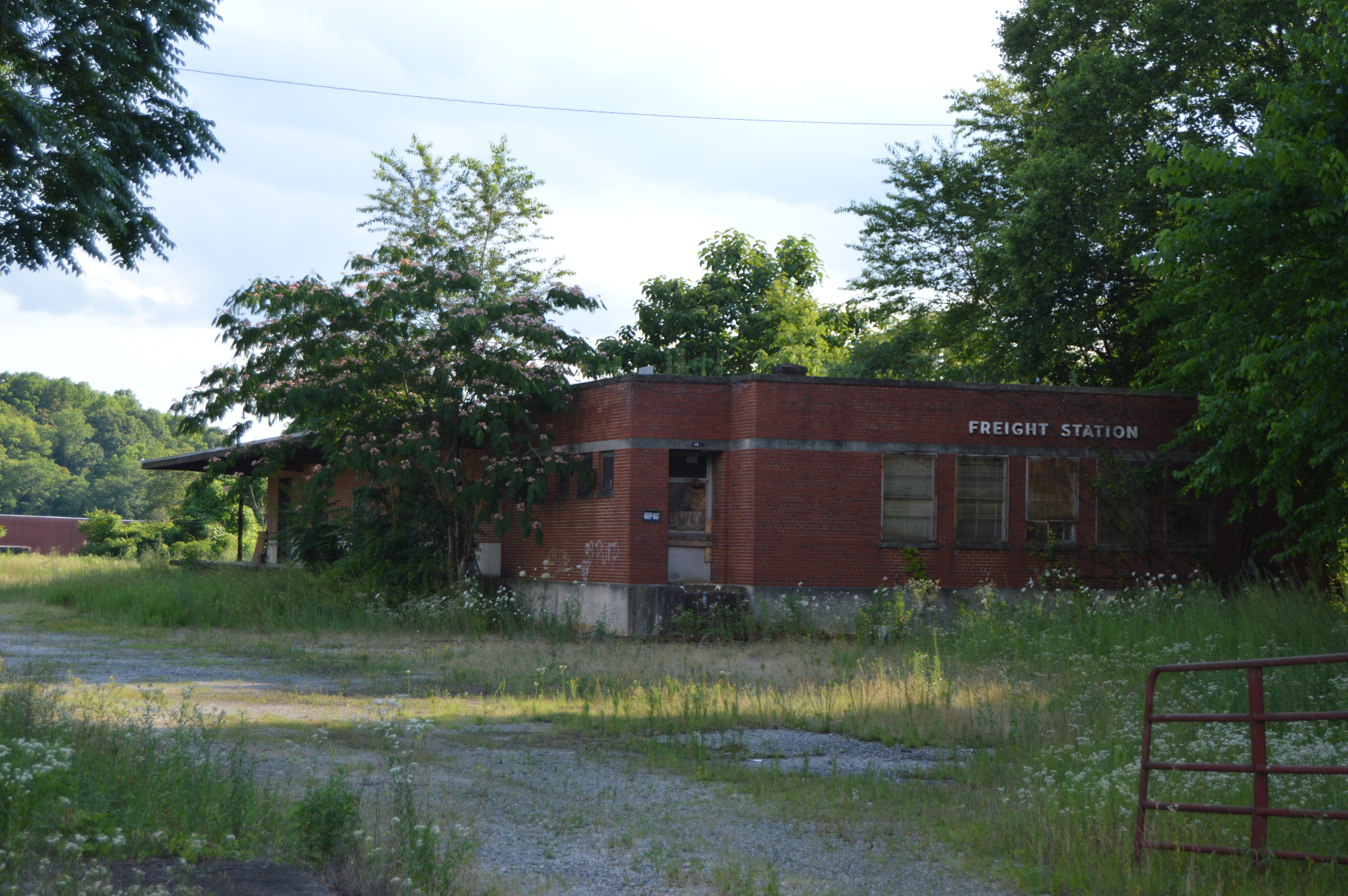
- Carolina and Northwestern Railway Freight Station (June 13, 2020)

- Location within North Carolina Location within the United States
- Location: 1407 College Ave. SW, Lenoir, North Carolina
- Coordinates: 35°54′29″N 81°32′52″W
- Area: 3.014 acres (1.220 ha)
- Built: c. 1950
- Architect: Unknown
- Architectural style: Modern Movement
- NRHP reference No.: 100004319
- Added to NRHP: August 29, 2019

Carolina and Northwestern Railway Freight Station is a historic railway station located at Lenoir, North Carolina. Built in 1950, it is listed on the National Register of Historic Places.

== History ==
The freight station was built in 1950 by Carolina and Northwestern Railway. It was abandoned in the year 1969. The station played an important role in the "substantial post-World War II growth of the furniture industry" in the Piedmont Triad community.
