= Legerwood, North Carolina =

- Unincorporated community
- Location within North Carolina Location within the United States
- Coordinates: 36°00′51″N 81°31′11″W
- Country: United States
- State: North Carolina
- County: Caldwell
- Elevation: 1,289 ft (393 m)
- Time zone: UTC-5 (Eastern (EST))
  - Summer (DST): UTC-4 (EDT)
- Area code: 828
- GNIS feature ID: 1021130

Legerwood is an unincorporated community in Caldwell County, North Carolina, United States. The community is on North Carolina Highway 268 7 miles (11 km) north of Lenoir.

The Patterson School Historic District in Legerwood is listed on the National Register of Historic Places.
