= Grandin, North Carolina =

- Unincorporated community
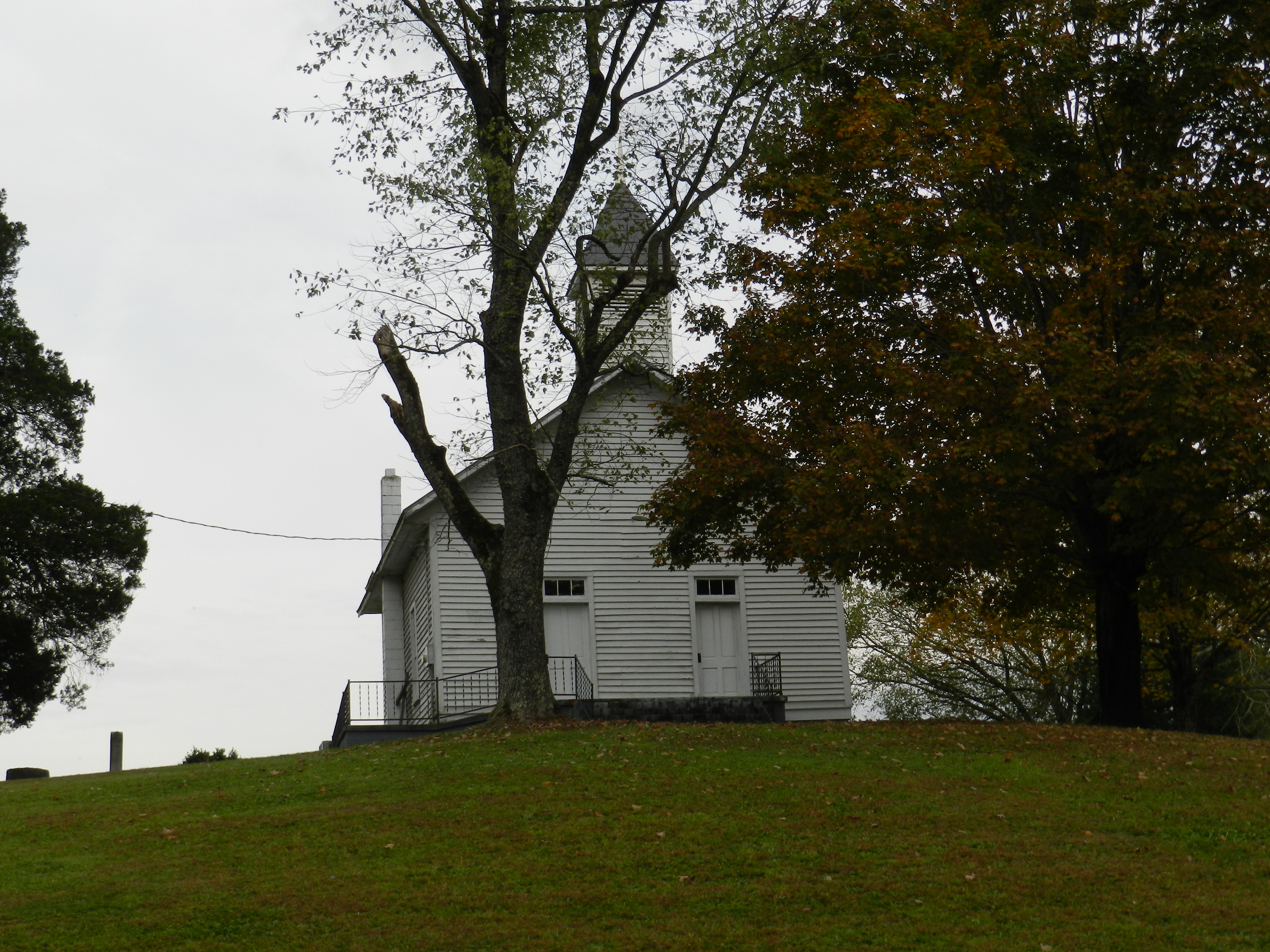
- Mariah's Chapel

- Location within North Carolina Location within the United States
- Coordinates: 36°02′38″N 81°24′57″W
- Country: United States
- State: North Carolina
- County: Caldwell
- Elevation: 1,135 ft (346 m)
- Time zone: UTC-5 (Eastern (EST))
  - Summer (DST): UTC-4 (EDT)
- Area code: 828
- GNIS feature ID: 1020487

Grandin is an unincorporated community in Caldwell County, North Carolina, United States. The community is located along secondary highways in northeastern Caldwell County, 11.3 miles (18.2 km) northeast of Lenoir.

Four sites in Grandin are listed on the National Register of Historic Places: Dula-Horton Cemetery, the William Hagler House, Mariah's Chapel, and Riverside.
