= William Hagler House =

Historic house in North Carolina, United States

- U.S. National Register of Historic Places
- Location within North Carolina Location within the United States
- Location: N of Grandin on SR 1510, near Grandin, North Carolina
- Coordinates: 36°03′31″N 81°24′29″W
- Area: 126 acres (51 ha)
- Built: c. 1838
- NRHP reference No.: 82001282
- Added to NRHP: December 28, 1982

William Hagler House, also known as Beech Hill and the Haigler House, is a historic home located near Grandin, Caldwell County, North Carolina. It was built about 1838, and is a two-story brick structure on a fieldstone foundation.

The house was listed on the National Register of Historic Places in 1982.
