= Riverside (Grandin, North Carolina) =

Historic house in North Carolina, United States

- U.S. National Register of Historic Places
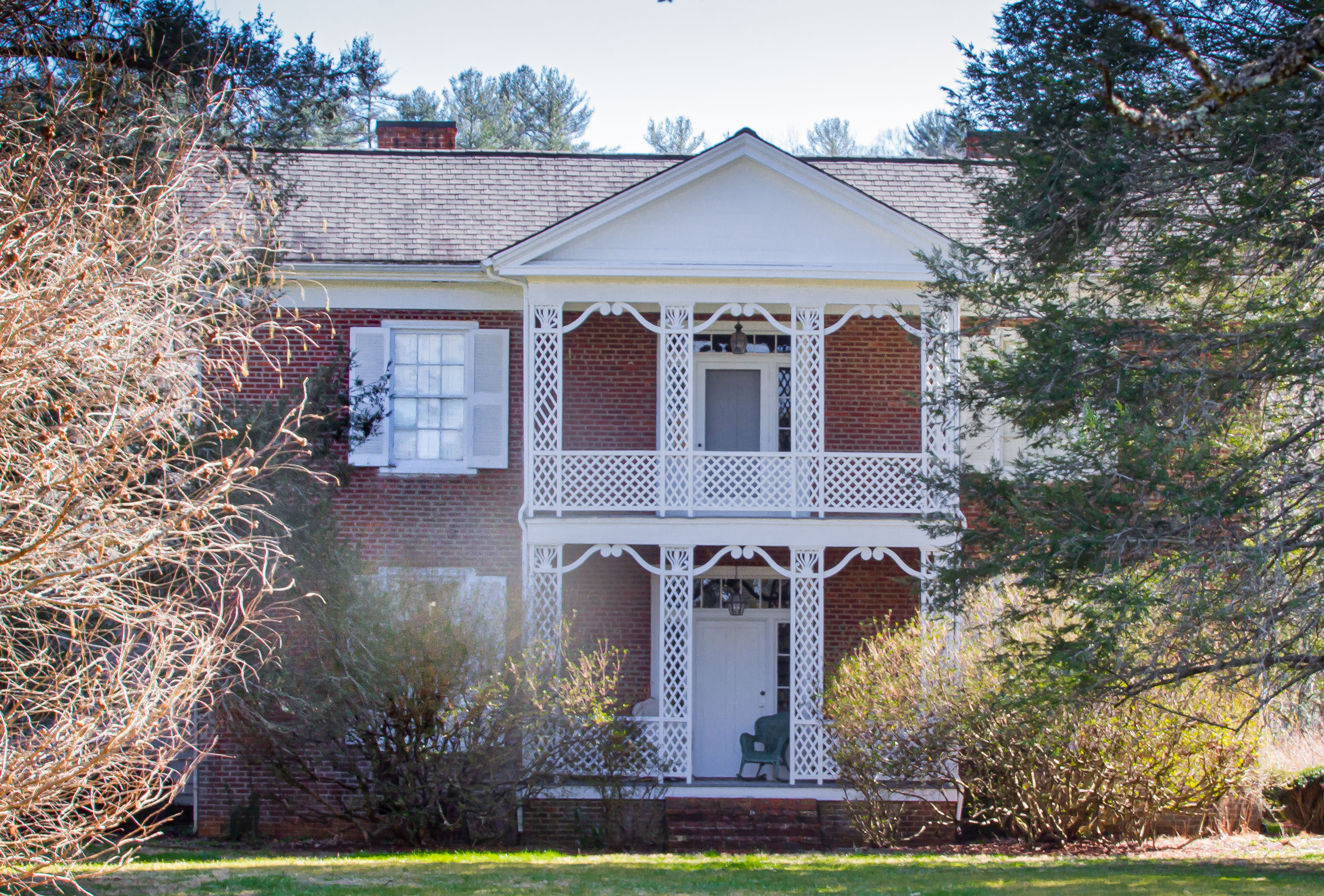

- Location within North Carolina Location within the United States
- Location: SW side NC 1552, 0.3 miles SE of jct with NC 268, near Grandin, North Carolina
- Coordinates: 36°03′22″N 81°25′55″W
- Area: 22.6 acres (9.1 ha)
- Built: c. 1860
- Architectural style: Greek Revival
- NRHP reference No.: 04000940
- Added to NRHP: September 2, 2004

Riverside, also known as the John Langdon Jones House, is a historic home located near Grandin, Caldwell County, North Carolina. It was built about 1860 and is a two-story, three-bay, brick, Greek Revival-style house with a rear ell. It features a center-bay, two-tier front porch with decorative woodwork. The landscape is considered a contributing site.

The house was listed on the National Register of Historic Places in 2004.
