= Patterson School Historic District =

Historic school building in North Carolina, United States

- U.S. National Register of Historic Places
- U.S. Historic district
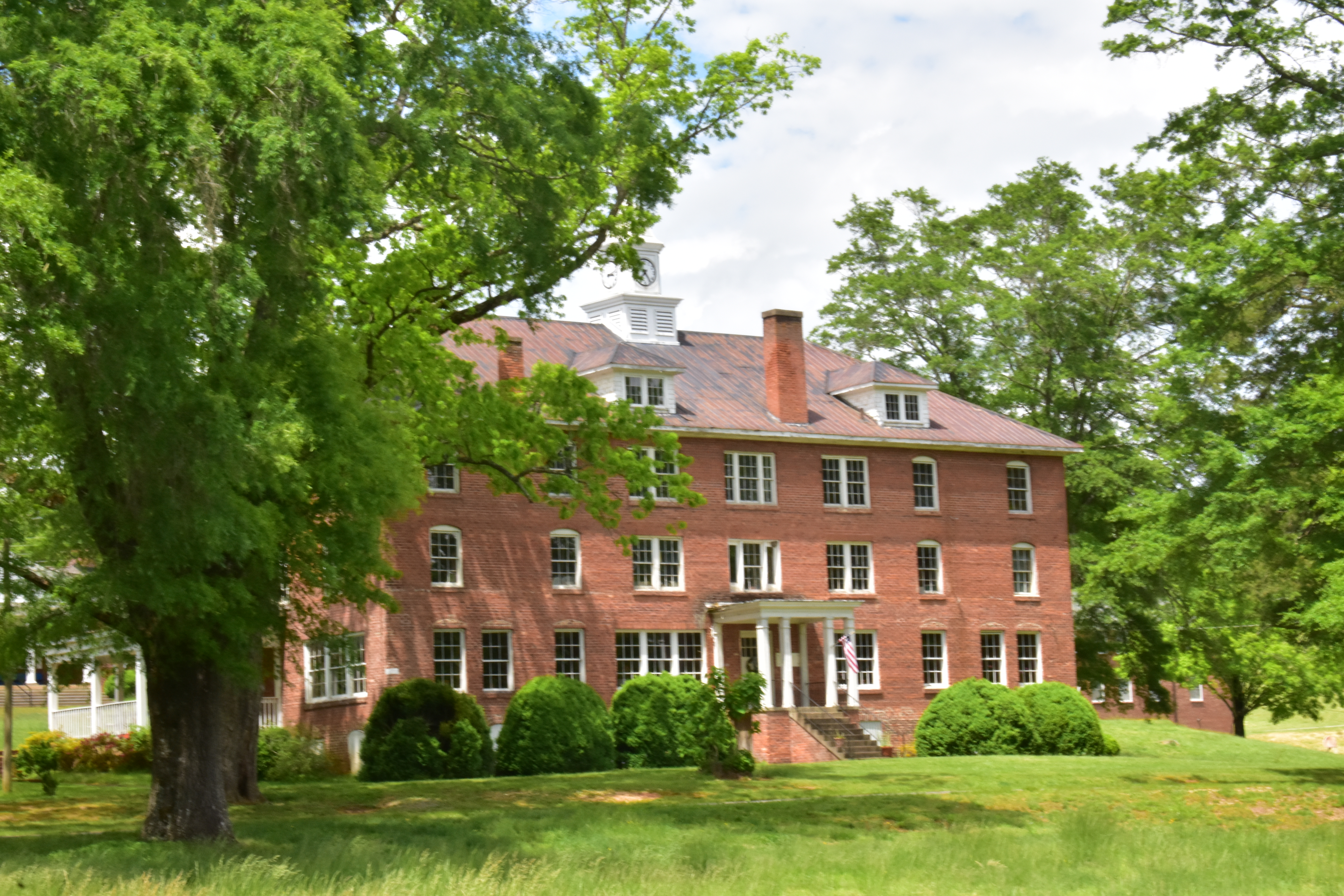

- Location within North Carolina Location within the United States
- Location: Along both sides of NC 268 at the jct. with NC 1504, Legerwood, North Carolina
- Coordinates: 36°01′17″N 81°31′18″W
- Area: 1,695 acres (6.86 km^{2})
- Built: 1912, 1918, 1920-1921, 1927, 1945
- Architectural style: Colonial Revival, Tudor Revival, et al.
- NRHP reference No.: 04001386
- Added to NRHP: December 22, 2004

Patterson School Historic District is a historic agricultural and Episcopal mission school complex and national historic district located at Legerwood, Caldwell County, North Carolina. The complex includes 13 contributing buildings, 2 contributing sites, and 3 contributing structures. Notable contributing resources include the Colonial Revival-style Palmyra Hall (1927), Sarah Joyce Lenoir Memorial Library (1922, 1951), Gard Hall (1920-1921), Headmaster's House (1912), Buffalo Creek Dam (pre-1940), Milk House (1945), two Barns (1920s, 1945), North Silo (1920s), Chapel of Rest (1918), Jones-Patterson Cemetery (1856-c. 1981), Hugh A. Dobbin House (c. 1939), and Tudor Revival-style Edgar A. Dobbin House (Greystone) (1930s). In 1994 the Episcopal Diocese of Western North Carolina sold the Patterson School property.

The school was established in 1910 to educate rural boys. The school complex was listed on the National Register of Historic Places in 2004.
