= Hudson, North Carolina =

- Town
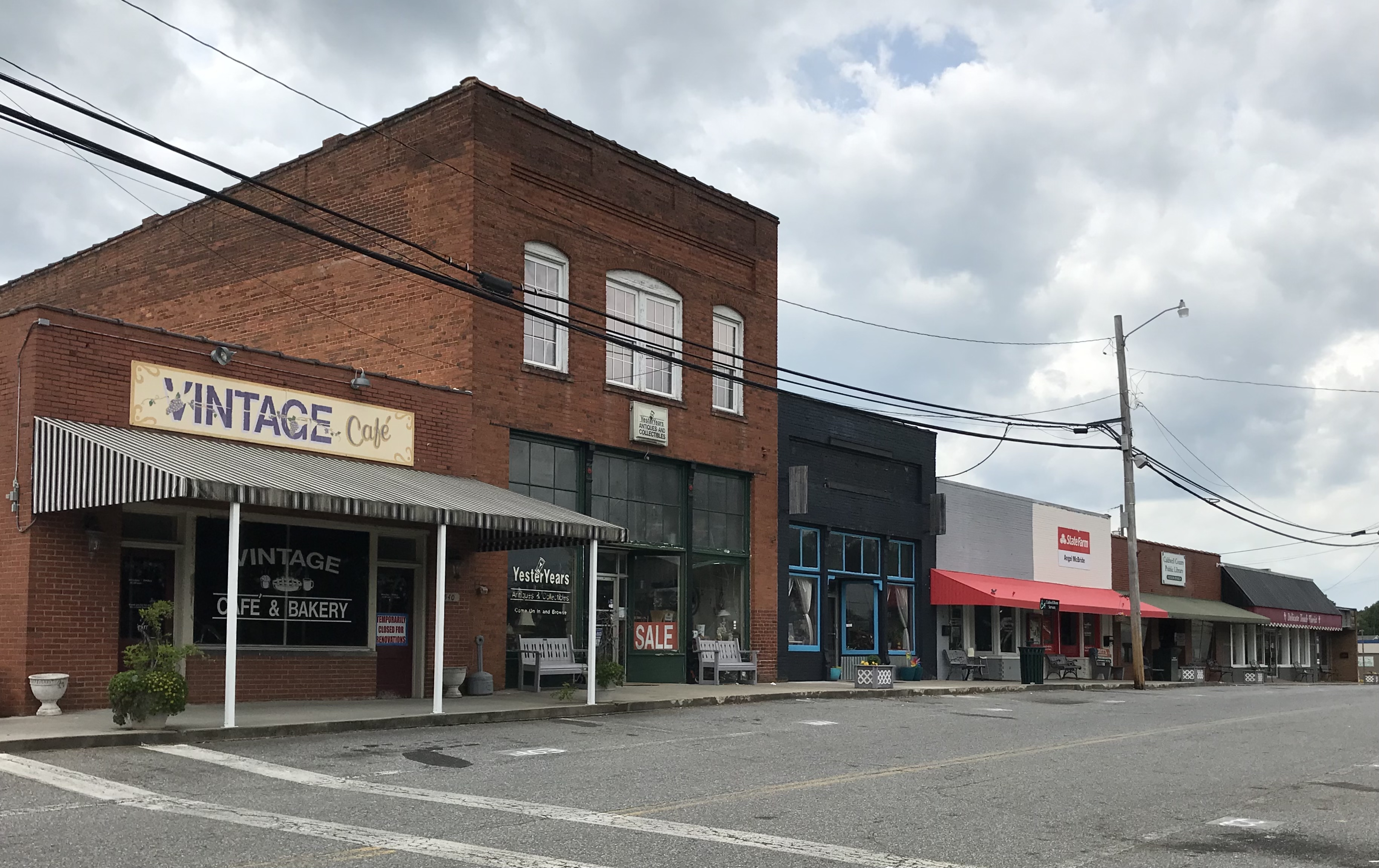
- Commercial buildings on Central Street

- Flag

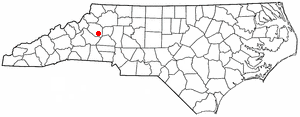
- Location of Hudson, North Carolina
- Coordinates: 35°50′44″N 81°29′25″W
- Country: United States
- State: North Carolina
- County: Caldwell

Area
  - Total: 3.66 sq mi (9.47 km^{2})
  - Land: 3.66 sq mi (9.47 km^{2})
  - Water: 0 sq mi (0.00 km^{2})
- Elevation: 1,217 ft (371 m)

Population (2020)
  - Total: 3,780
  - Density: 1,033.4/sq mi (398.99/km^{2})
- Time zone: UTC-5 (Eastern (EST))
  - Summer (DST): UTC-4 (EDT)
- ZIP code: 28638
- Area code: 828
- FIPS code: 37-32980
- GNIS feature ID: 2405871
- Website: www.townofhudsonnc.com

Hudson is a town in Caldwell County, North Carolina, United States. As of the 2020 census, Hudson had a population of 3,780. It is part of the Hickory–Lenoir–Morganton Metropolitan Statistical Area.

== History ==
Hudson originated as a sawmill camp, with timber being the initial attraction to the area. Among early settlers to Hudson, were the Hudson brothers, Monroe and Johnnie. The name Hudson was selected honoring these two brothers as the name of the community. "Hudsonville" would come into being in 1880, with the "ville" being dropped in 1889 due to mail confusion with Hendersonville. In 1905, Hudson was incorporated as a town.

In 1904, businessman B.B. Hayes of the textile business came to Hudson and established the first big industry, the Hudson Cotten Mill (known as Shuford Mills). The Hudson Cotton Manufacturing Company was listed on the National Register of Historic Places in 2013.

== Overview ==
Hudson is located in the foothills region of Western North Carolina. Located in an area once known mainly for its furniture industry, businesses in Hudson today include Shurtape Technologies, Kincaid Furniture, BeoCare, The Gold Mine Fine Jewelry & Gifts and Sattler USA. According to the 2020 census, Hudson has a population of approximately 3,800 people. During the day this jumps to well over 10,000 due to those who work in town and those who attend school at Caldwell Community College and other surrounding schools.

Hudson's landmarks, most of which are located near the main street area, include the Hudson Uptown Building (known as the "HUB Station", site of the former Hudson Elementary school, now an event space), local businesses along main street, and Caldwell Community College from US 321.

The town has two parks. Redwood Park features a playground, swimming pool, basketball and tennis courts, several ballfields, and a dog park. The Hickman Windmill Park & Depot Museum features the Historic Hudson Depot and Red Caboose, as well as a 19th century windmill. Music is often performed in the park, most notably Pickin' in the Park during summer months which later evolved into the Hudson Hometown Concert Series.

On clear days, Hudson offers views of the Blue Ridge Mountains, including Grandfather Mountain. These views can be seen over Hudson Middle School directly off the US Highway 321 Hudson exit. Hudson also hosts Caldwell County's oldest continuous event, The Butterfly Festival, which is held the first Saturday every May with attendance of between 8,000–10,000 people.

== Geography ==
Hudson is located in southern Caldwell County. It is bordered to the north by the city of Lenoir, the county seat, and to the south by the town of Sawmills. U.S. Route 321, a four-lane highway, runs along the eastern edge of the town, leading northwest into Lenoir and southeast 11 miles (18 km) to Hickory. US 321 Alternate passes through the center of the town as Main Street.

According to the United States Census Bureau, the town of Hudson has a total area of 3.7 square miles (9.7 km^{2}), all land.

== Demographics ==
Historical population
| Census | Pop. | Note | %± |
|---|---|---|---|
| 1910 | 411 | | — |
| 1920 | 403 | | −1.9% |
| 1930 | 650 | | 61.3% |
| 1940 | 748 | | 15.1% |
| 1950 | 922 | | 23.3% |
| 1960 | 1,536 | | 66.6% |
| 1970 | 2,820 | | 83.6% |
| 1980 | 2,888 | | 2.4% |
| 1990 | 2,819 | | −2.4% |
| 2000 | 3,078 | | 9.2% |
| 2010 | 3,776 | | 22.7% |
| 2020 | 3,780 | | 0.1% |
U.S. Decennial Census

=== 2020 census ===
As of the 2020 census, Hudson had a population of 3,780. The median age was 43.9 years. 20.6% of residents were under the age of 18 and 20.2% of residents were 65 years of age or older. For every 100 females there were 93.7 males, and for every 100 females age 18 and over there were 92.2 males age 18 and over. 100.0% of residents lived in urban areas, while 0.0% lived in rural areas.

There were 1,617 households in Hudson, of which 28.4% had children under the age of 18 living in them. Of all households, 48.8% were married-couple households, 17.5% were households with a male householder and no spouse or partner present, and 28.7% were households with a female householder and no spouse or partner present. About 31.3% of all households were made up of individuals and 14.9% had someone living alone who was 65 years of age or older. There were 1,048 families residing in the town.

There were 1,717 housing units, of which 5.8% were vacant. The homeowner vacancy rate was 0.7% and the rental vacancy rate was 6.3%.

Hudson racial composition
| Race | Number | Percentage |
|---|---|---|
| White (non-Hispanic) | 3,305 | 87.43% |
| Black or African American (non-Hispanic) | 63 | 1.67% |
| Native American | 4 | 0.11% |
| Asian | 16 | 0.42% |
| Other/Mixed | 126 | 3.33% |
| Hispanic or Latino | 266 | 7.04% |

=== 2000 census ===
As of the census of 2000, there were 3,078 people, 1,324 households, and 933 families residing in the town. The population density was 839.3 inhabitants per square mile (324.1/km^{2}). There were 1,400 housing units at an average density of 381.8 per square mile (147.4/km^{2}). The racial makeup of the town was 97.40% White, 0.13% African American, 0.13% Native American, 0.81% Asian, 1.10% from other races, and 0.42% from two or more races. Hispanic or Latino of any race were 1.49% of the population.

There were 1,324 households, out of which 26.4% had children under the age of 18 living with them, 56.3% were married couples living together, 10.3% had a female householder with no husband present, and 29.5% were non-families. 25.5% of all households were made up of individuals, and 10.3% had someone living alone who was 65 years of age or older. The average household size was 2.32 and the average family size was 2.77.

In the town, the population was spread out, with 20.0% under the age of 18, 8.7% from 18 to 24, 29.3% from 25 to 44, 25.5% from 45 to 64, and 16.5% who were 65 years of age or older. The median age was 40 years. For every 100 females, there were 89.9 males. For every 100 females age 18 and over, there were 87.5 males.

The median income for a household in the town was $35,562, and the median income for a family was $42,000. Males had a median income of $29,949 versus $22,727 for females. The per capita income for the town was $20,519. About 3.7% of families and 7.6% of the population were below the poverty line, including none of those under age 18 and 5.6% of those age 65 or over.

== Education ==
=== High schools ===
- Caldwell Applied Sciences Academy
- Caldwell Early College High School
- South Caldwell High School

=== Middle school ===
- Hudson Middle School

=== Elementary school ===
- Hudson Elementary School

=== Private school ===
- Heritage Christian School

=== Independent school ===
- Moravian Prep

=== Higher education ===
- Appalachian Center at Caldwell (located on Hudson Campus of CCC&TI)
- Caldwell Community College & Technical Institute

== Media ==
- WHKY, 1290 WHKY TalkRadio, local radio station
- WJRI, Just Right Radio 100.5 FM/1340 AM WJRI, local radio stations
- WKGX, Classic Hits 104.5 FM/1080 AM WKGX, local radio stations
- WKVS, Hot New Country KICKS 103.3 FM WKVS, local radio station
- WAIZ, "63 Big Ways", AM 630, local radio station featuring 1950s and 1960s oldies

== Notable people ==
- Jennifer Alley, former women's head basketball coach at University of North Carolina at Chapel Hill, led team to ACC championship in 1984
- Thomas Beane, professional stock car racing driver
- Madison Bumgarner, MLB pitcher, 4x All-Star selection, 3x World Series champion and 2014 World Series MVP
- Linda Combs, former U.S. federal government official
- Jan Karon, New York Times #1 bestselling author of the Mitford series of novels
- Bob McCreary, NFL player and furniture business entrepreneur
