= Lenoir Cotton Mill (North Carolina) =

- Lenoir Cotton Mill-Blue Bell Inc. Plant
- U.S. National Register of Historic Places
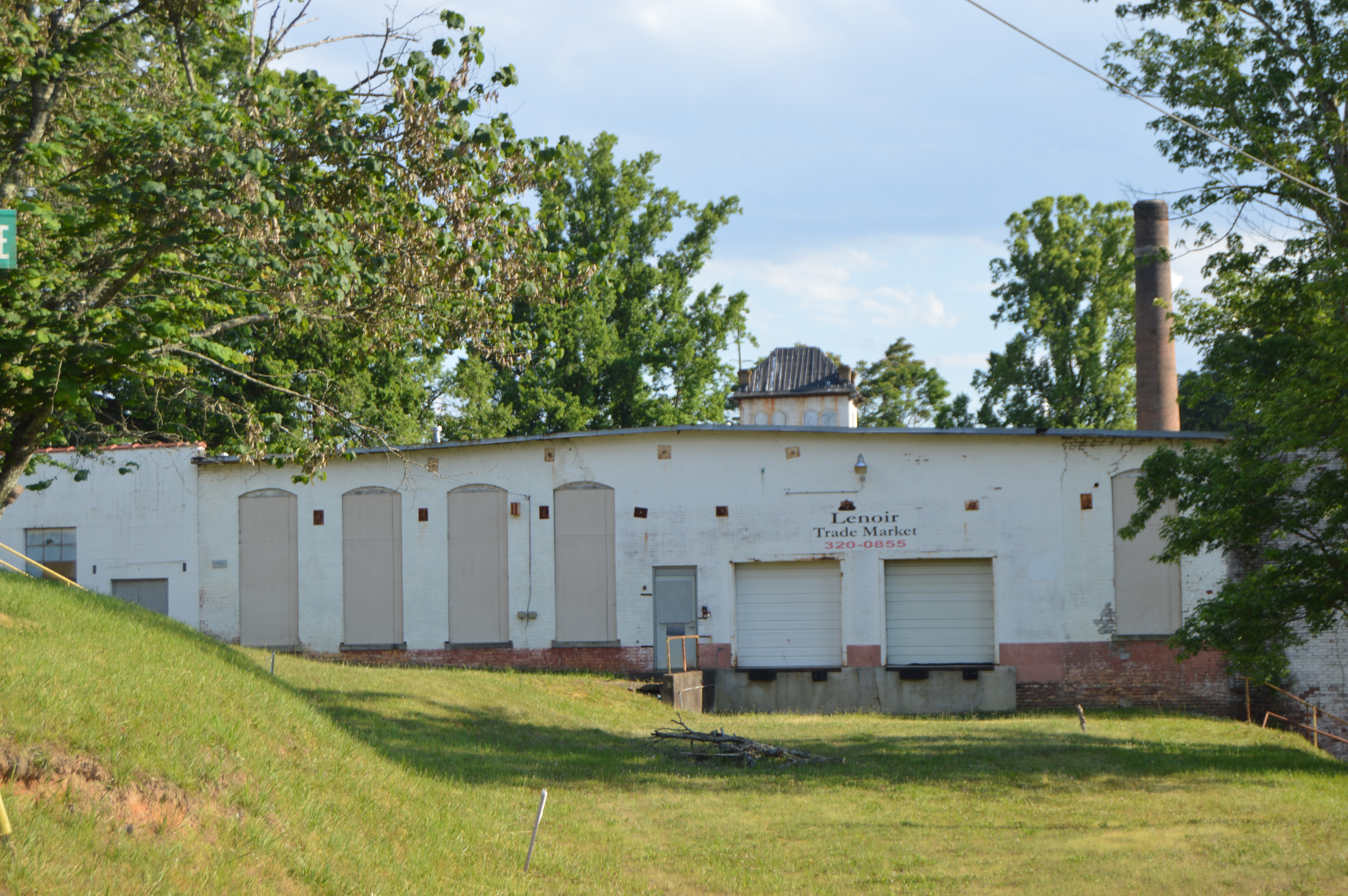
- North end of building in 2020

- Location within North Carolina Location within the United States
- Location: 241 College Avenue, Lenoir, North Carolina
- Coordinates: 35°54′31″N 81°32′47″W
- Built: 1902
- NRHP reference No.: 100001630
- Added to NRHP: September 18, 2017

The Lenoir Cotton Mill, later the Blue Bell Inc. Plant is a historic textile mill and factory in Lenoir, North Carolina.

Built in 1902 as a textile mill, the building doubled in size the next year, employing approximately 200 people until the 1920s. In 1927, Blue Bell, Inc. began manufacturing denim overalls there. The plant was expanded to employ up to 1,600 people, mostly women, who manufactured military apparel for the U.S. Army and Navy. In 1991, the property was sold and converted into offices for small businesses.

The building is listed on the National Register of Historic Places.
