= The Fountain (Yadkin Valley, North Carolina) =

Historic house in North Carolina, United States

- U.S. National Register of Historic Places
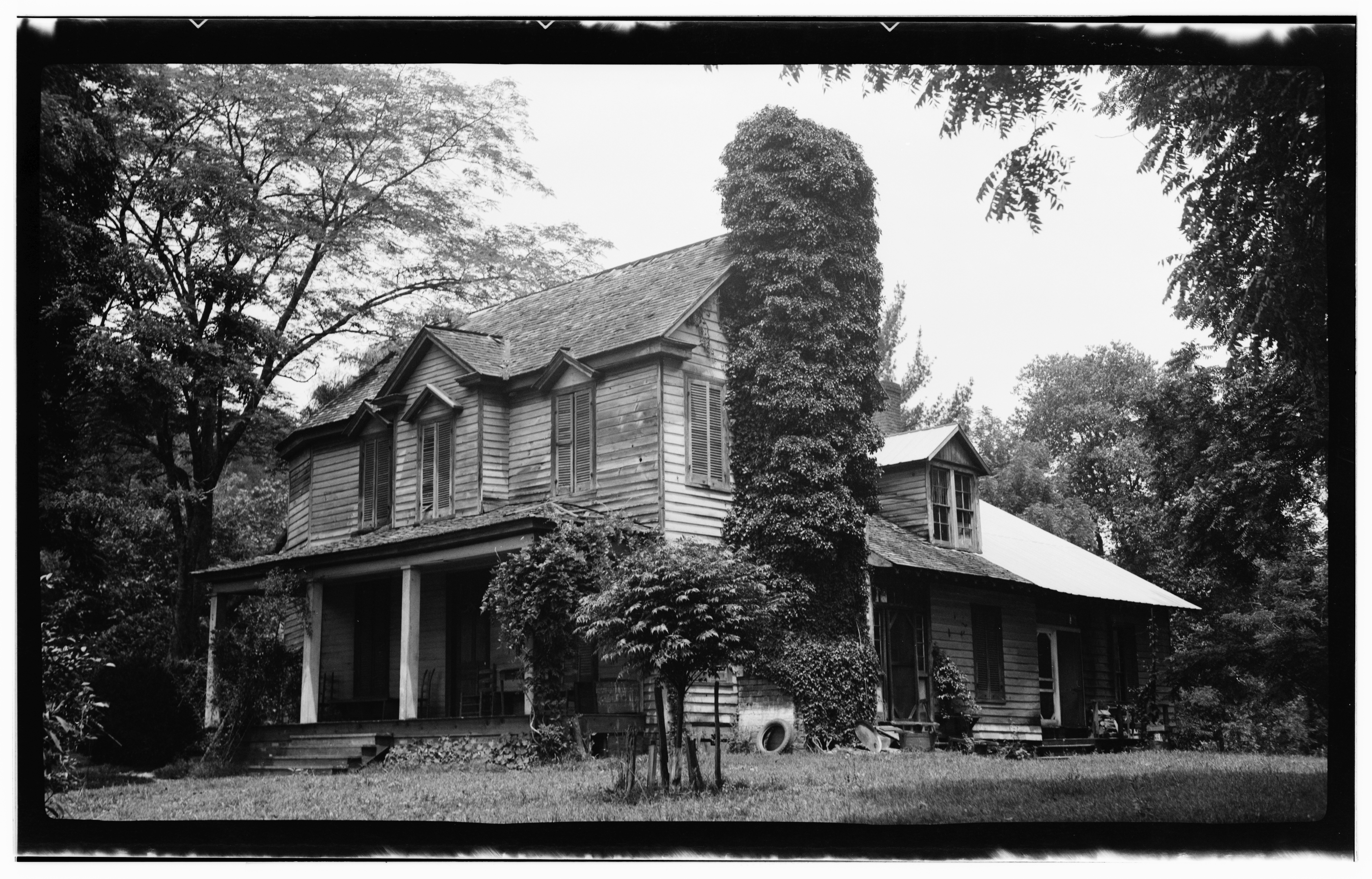
- 1937 HABS photo of the house

- Location within North Carolina Location within the United States
- Location: 1677 NC 268, Yadkin Valley, North Carolina
- Coordinates: 35°59′57″N 81°32′19″W
- Area: 2.5 acres (1.0 ha)
- Built: 1807
- Architectural style: Federal, Greek Revival, et al.
- NRHP reference No.: 04000942
- Added to NRHP: September 2, 2004

The Fountain, also known as Walnut Fountain and the Colonel Davenport House, is a historic plantation home located at Yadkin Valley, Caldwell County, North Carolina. It was built in 1807, and is a two-story, T-shaped frame dwelling with Federal and Greek Revival style design elements. Also on the property is a contributing brick well house/dairy (c. 1865–1870).

It was listed on the National Register of Historic Places in 2004.
