= Mariah's Chapel =

Historic cemetery in North Carolina, United States

- U.S. National Register of Historic Places
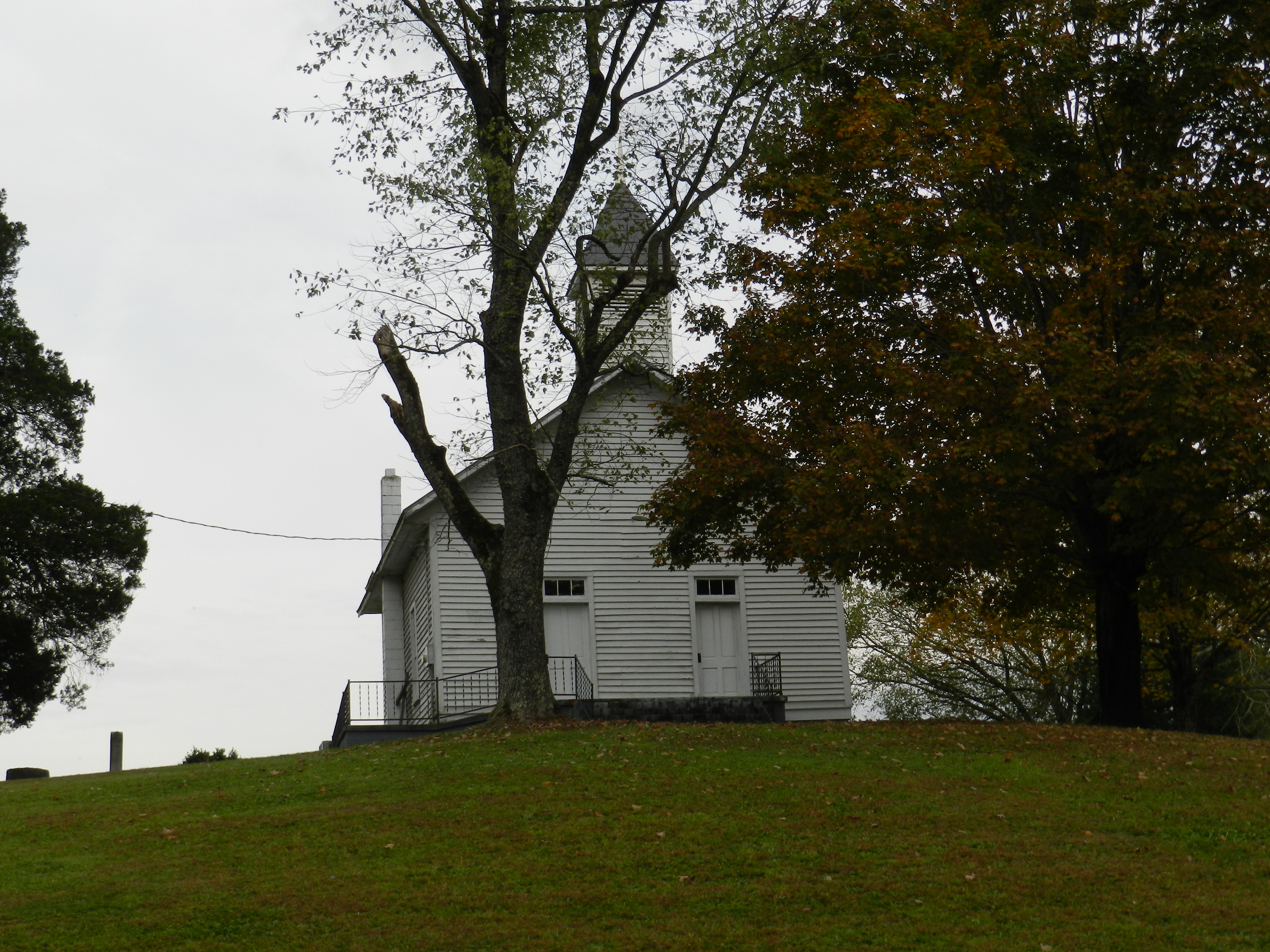
- Mariah's Chapel in Caldwell County, North Carolina as seen from Grandin Road

- Location within North Carolina Location within the United States
- Location: NC 1552, 0.4 miles SE of jct with NC 268, near Grandin, North Carolina
- Coordinates: 36°3′33″N 81°25′47″W
- Area: 1.7 acres (0.69 ha)
- Built: 1879
- NRHP reference No.: 04000939
- Added to NRHP: September 02, 2004

Mariah's Chapel is a historic United Methodist chapel located near Grandin, Caldwell County, North Carolina. It was built in 1879, and is a simple frame church building. It features a square belfry with a pyramidal roof and a needle spire. Also on the property is the contributing church cemetery with approximately 100 graves.

It was listed on the National Register of Historic Places in 2004.
