= Jennifer Alley =

American basketball coach

Jennifer Elaine Alley
- Occupations: Basketball coach, teacher, administrator
- Years active: 1977–1986

Jennifer Elaine Alley is a former college basketball coach. She served as head coach of the University of North Carolina at Chapel Hill women's basketball team from 1977 to 1986.

Alley was the first full-time head coach of the Tar Heels' women's basketball program, and her tenure included an ACC championship in 1984.

A native of Hudson, North Carolina, Alley was awarded the Nike Lifetime Achievement Award by Women Leaders in College Sports in 2020. She also was honored as an ACC Women’s Basketball Legend in 2009 and was named Appalachian State's University Distinguished Alumni of the Year in 2006. In 2023, she was inducted into the Greater Wilmington Sports Hall of Fame, for her time spent helping serve the UNC Wilmington athletic department. Alley is also an inductee of the Caldwell County Sports Hall of Fame.

== Awards and honors ==
- 1984 – ACC Women's Basketball Champions
