= Yadkin Valley, North Carolina =

- Unincorporated community
- Location within North Carolina Location within the United States
- Coordinates: 36°01′20″N 81°29′24″W
- Country: United States
- State: North Carolina
- County: Caldwell
- Elevation: 1,165 ft (355 m)
- Time zone: UTC-5 (Eastern (EST))
  - Summer (DST): UTC-4 (EDT)
- Area code: 828
- GNIS feature ID: 1016852

Yadkin Valley is an unincorporated community in Caldwell County, North Carolina, United States. The community is on North Carolina Highway 268 7.9 miles (12.7 km) north-northeast of Lenoir.

Two sites in Yadkin Valley, The Fountain and the Walter James Lenoir House, are listed on the National Register of Historic Places.
