= Clover Hill (Patterson, North Carolina) =

Historic house in North Carolina, United States

- U.S. National Register of Historic Places
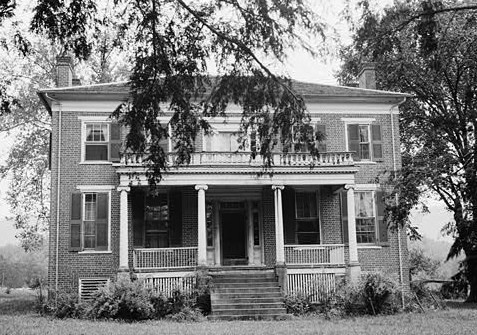
- Clover Hill, HABS Photo, June 1937

- Location within North Carolina Location within the United States
- Location: E of Patterson off NC 268 on SR 1514, near Patterson, North Carolina
- Coordinates: 35°59′41″N 81°31′40″W
- Area: 40 acres (16 ha)
- Built: 1846
- Architectural style: Greek Revival
- NRHP reference No.: 73001301
- Added to NRHP: May 25, 1973

Clover Hill, also known as Colonel Edmund Jones House, is a historic plantation house near Patterson, Caldwell County, North Carolina. Located on a knoll within the Happy Valley at the foot of the Appalachian Mountains, Clover Hill was built in 1846 by Colonel Edmund W. Jones for his bride Sonia C. Davenport. It is a two-story, five-bay, brick, Greek Revival-style house. The house sits on a raised basement and has a hipped roof. Additionally, it features a shed porch supported by four handsome fluted Ionic order columns. Inside the house, the interior is decorated with typical Greek Revival trim, such as Ionic and Doric colonnettes.

The house was listed on the National Register of Historic Places in 1973 for, according to the Statement of Significance, "its unusually handsome Ionic porch, entrances" and its well-executed interiors"
