= Hudson Cotton Manufacturing Company =

Historic industrial complex in North Carolina, US

- U.S. National Register of Historic Places
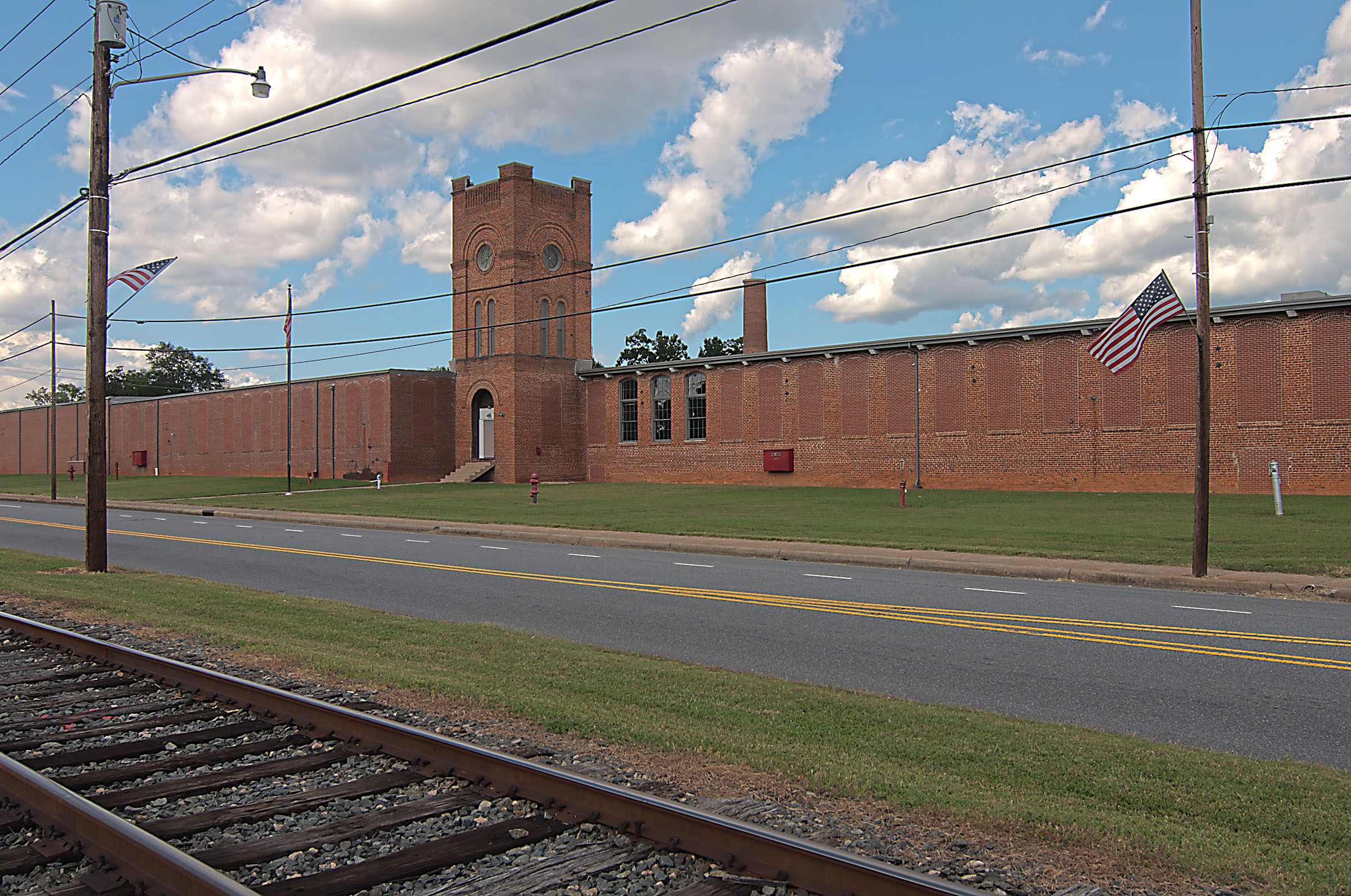

- Location within North Carolina Location within the United States
- Location: 447 Main St., Hudson, North Carolina
- Coordinates: 35°51′01″N 81°29′44″W
- Area: 7.64 acres (3.09 ha)
- Built: 1904, 1924, c. 1930, 1950s, 1984, 1992
- NRHP reference No.: 13000636
- Added to NRHP: August 28, 2013

Hudson Cotton Manufacturing Company, also known as Shuford Mills, is a historic textile mill located at Hudson, Caldwell County, North Carolina. It was built in stages between 1904 and 1992, and is a large, one-story, brick (both solid and veneered) building of nearly 180,000 square feet. It features a three-stage, square, brick tower built as part of the original, 1904, construction.

It was listed on the National Register of Historic Places in 2013.
