= 2019 United States House of Representatives elections =

- May 21, 2019 – September 10, 2019

3 of the 435 seats in the United States House of Representatives 218 seats needed for a majority
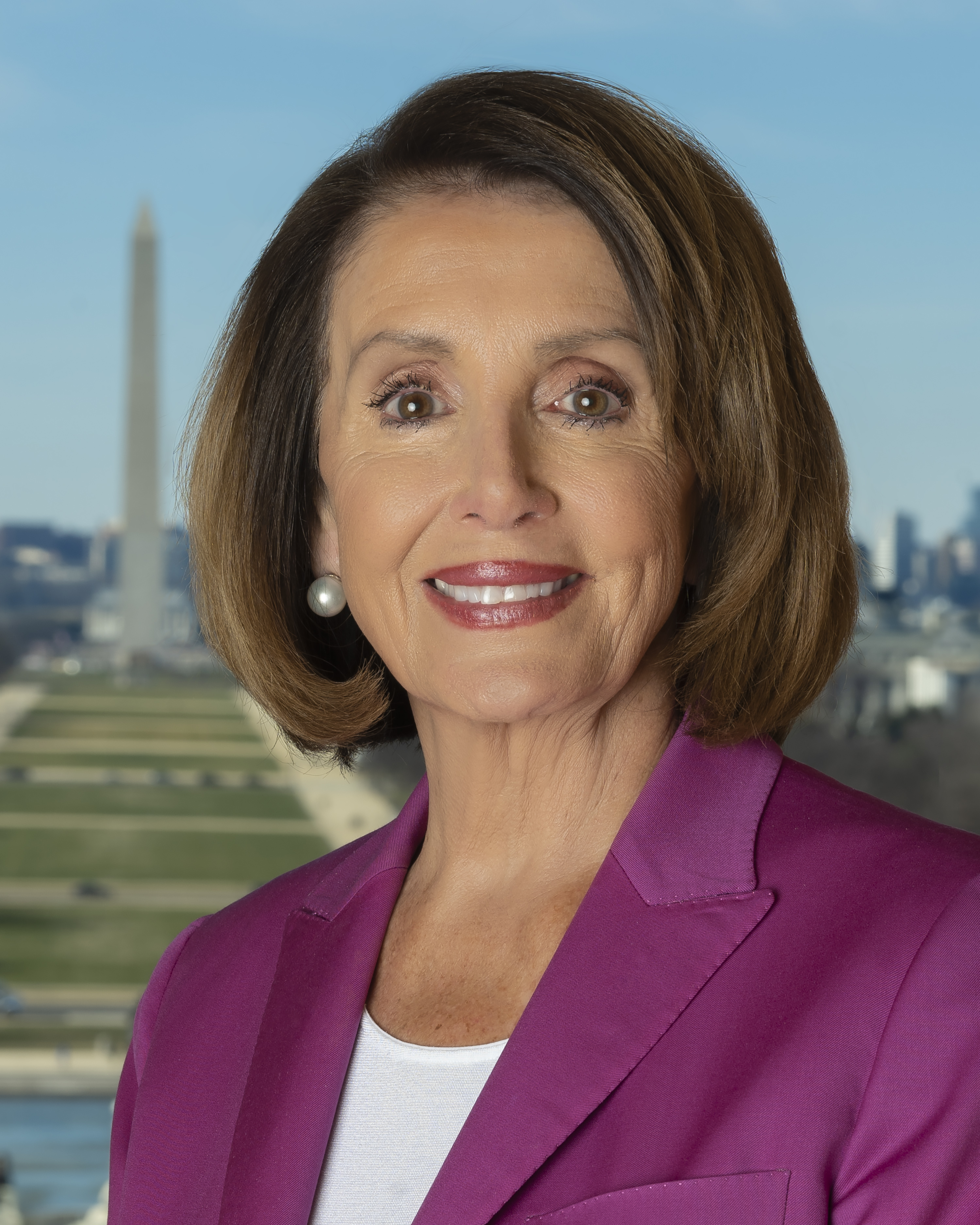

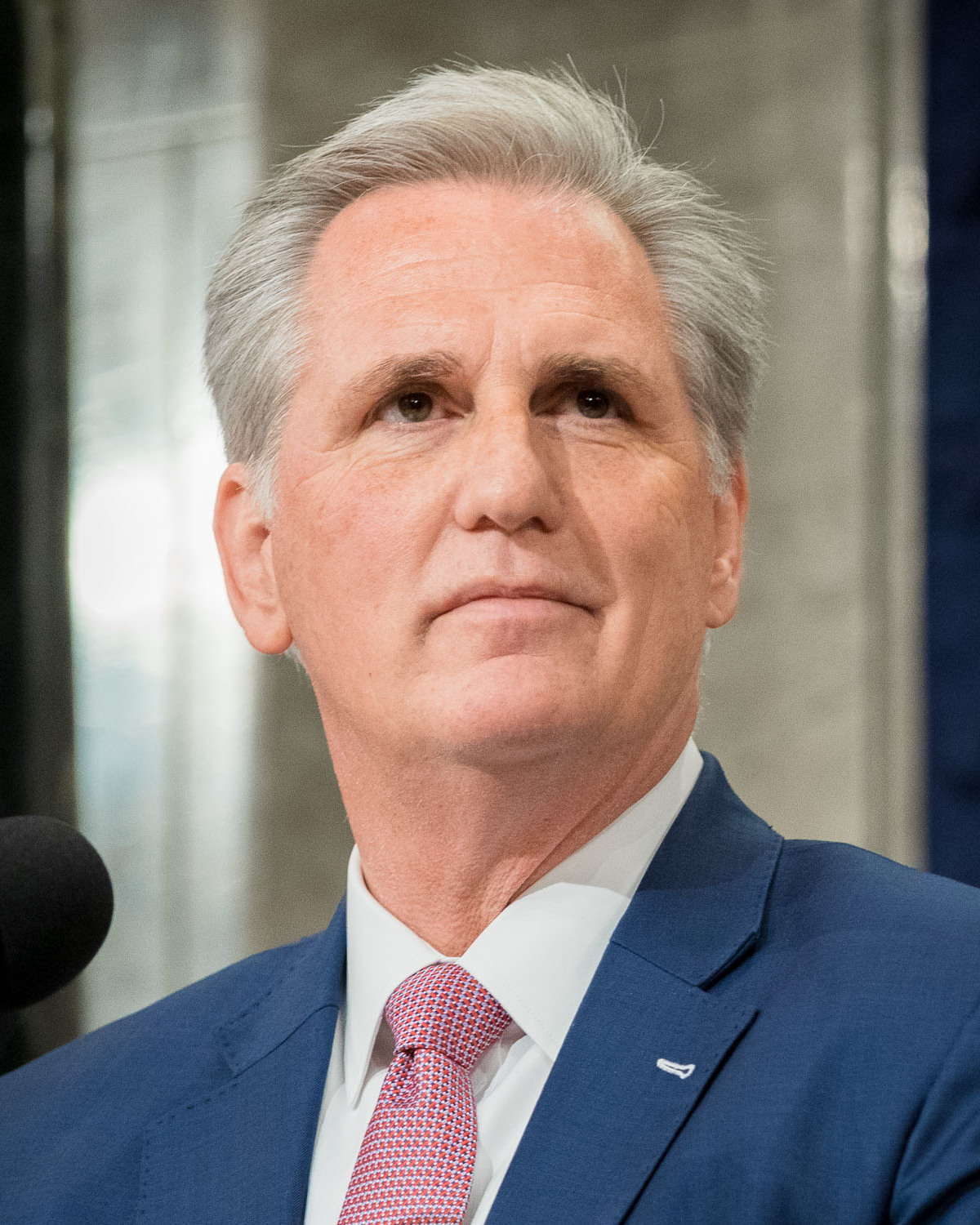
	Majority party	Minority party
Leader	Nancy Pelosi	Kevin McCarthy
Party	Democratic	Republican
Leader since	January 3, 2003	January 3, 2019
Leader's seat	California 12th	California 23rd
Last election	235 seats	199 seats
Seats won	0	3
Seat change	Steady	▲1
Popular vote	177,718	256,980
Percentage	40.69%	58.84%
- Results: Republican hold

There were three special elections to the United States House of Representatives in 2019 during the 116th United States Congress.

Two of the three seats were won by the party previously holding the seat. One seat, which was left vacant, was picked up by the Republican Party.

== Summary ==
Elections are listed by date and district.

District	Incumbent			This race	
District	Member	Party	First elected	Results	Candidates
Pennsylvania 12	Tom Marino	Republican	2010	Incumbent resigned January 23, 2019 to take job in private sector. New member elected May 21, 2019. Republican hold.	▌ ✓ Fred Keller (Republican) 68.1%; ▌Marc Friedenberg (Democratic) 31.9%
North Carolina 3	Walter B. Jones Jr.	Republican	1994	Incumbent died February 10, 2019. New member elected September 10, 2019. Republican hold.	▌ ✓ Greg Murphy (Republican) 61.74%; ▌Allen Thomas (Democratic) 37.47%; ▌Greg Holt (Constitution) 0.44%; ▌Tim Harris (Libertarian) 0.35%
North Carolina 9	Vacant			In the 2018 election certification was denied under a cloud of suspected election fraud. New member elected September 10, 2019. Republican hold.	▌ ✓ Dan Bishop (Republican) 50.74%; ▌Dan McCready (Democratic) 48.66%; ▌Jeff Scott (Libertarian) 0.40%; ▌Loran Allen Smith (Green) 0.20%

== Pennsylvania's 12th congressional district ==
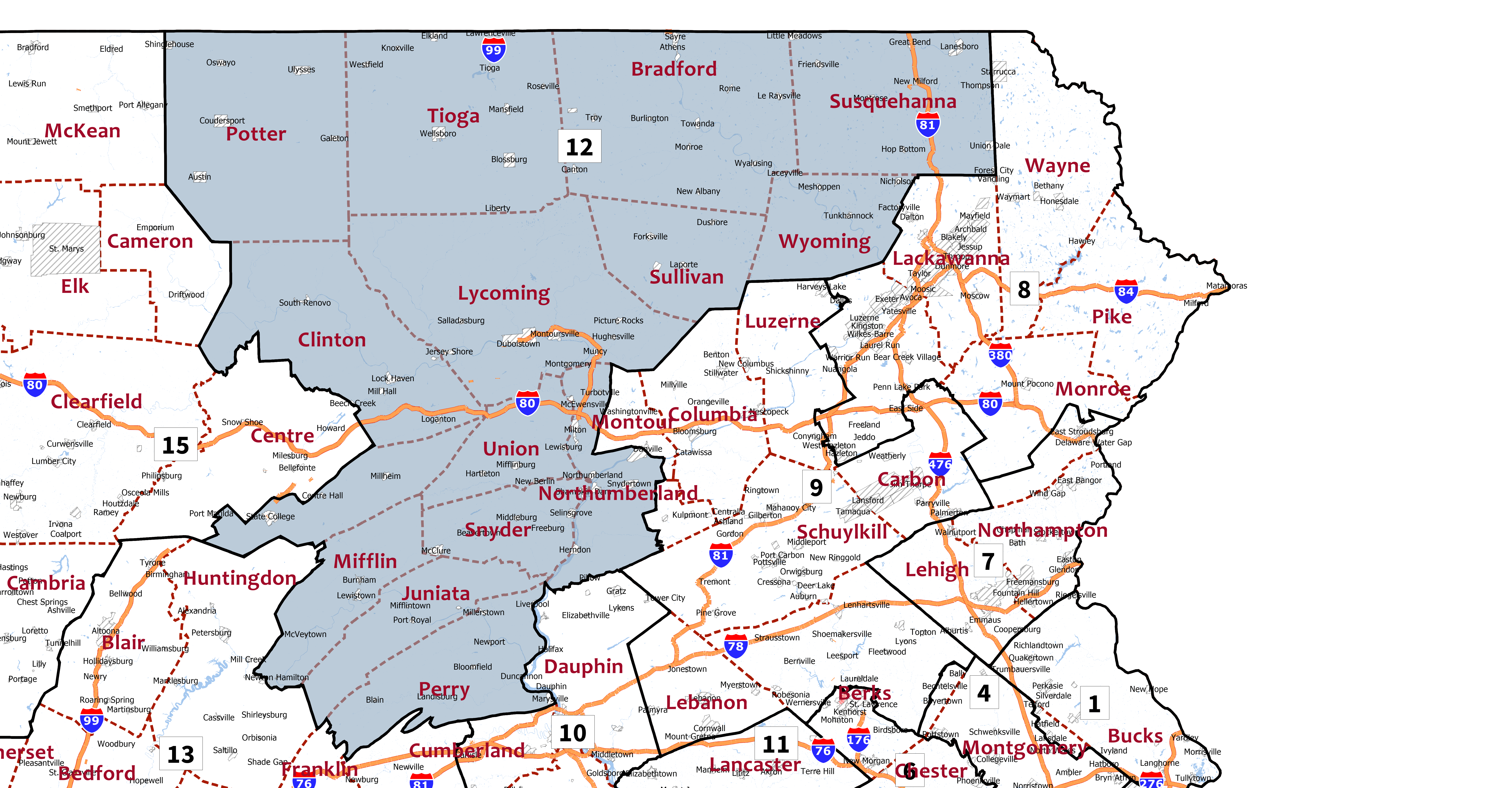
Pennsylvania's 12th congressional district

Incumbent Republican Tom Marino resigned from office on January 23, 2019 to work in the private sector. Governor Tom Wolf called for an election to be held on May 21, four months after Marino's resignation. Primary elections were not held, with nominees being chosen by each party. Republican nominee Fred Keller secured the seat from the Democratic nominee Marc Friedenberg, who was the only candidate to submit an application.

2019 Pennsylvania's 12th congressional district special election
Party	Candidate	Votes	%	±%
Republican	Fred Keller	90,000	68.08	▲2.04
Democratic	Marc Friedenberg	42,195	31.92	▼2.04
Total votes		132,195	100.00	
Republican hold				

== North Carolina's 3rd congressional district ==
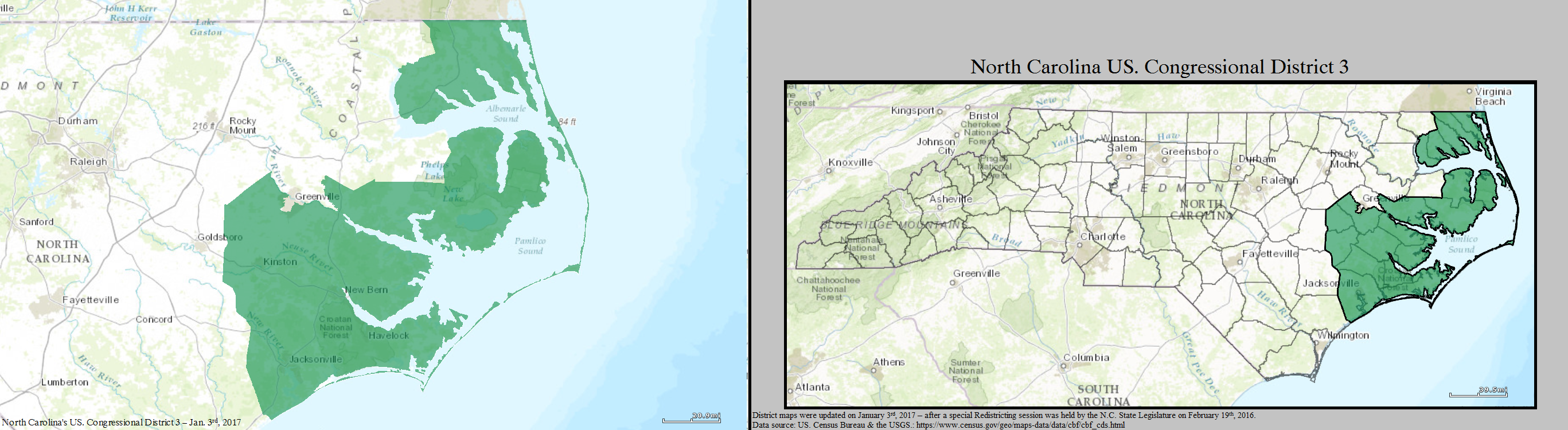
North Carolina's 3rd congressional district

Incumbent Republican Walter B. Jones Jr., who was planning to retire from Congress, died on February 10, 2019. Governor Roy Cooper scheduled the special election for September 10, 2019, with primaries being held on April 30. Republican nominee Greg Murphy won a clear victory, defeating Democrat Allen M. Thomas, Libertarian Tim Harris, and Constitution candidate Greg Holt.

2019 North Carolina's 3rd congressional district special election
Party	Candidate	Votes	%	±%
Republican	Greg Murphy	70,407	61.74	▼38.26
Democratic	Allen Thomas	42,738	37.47	
Constitution	Greg Holt	507	0.44	
Libertarian	Tim Harris	394	0.35	
Total votes		114,046	100.00	
Republican hold				

== North Carolina's 9th congressional district ==
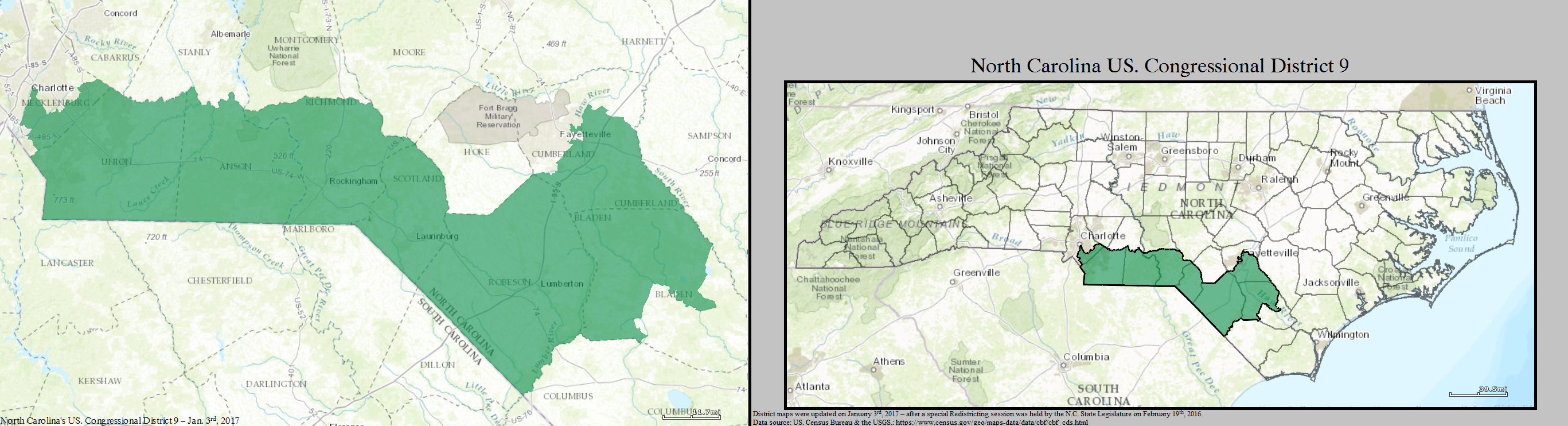
North Carolina's 9th congressional district

The seat was left vacant after the results of the 2018 election were uncertified by the state election board due to allegations of electoral fraud. Because of the previous election's slim margin (around 900 votes), this election was considered highly competitive. Primaries were held on May 14, and the general election was held on September 10. Republican nominee Dan Bishop defeated Democratic candidate Dan McCready by a slightly larger margin than Mark Harris.

2019 North Carolina's 9th congressional district special election
Party	Candidate	Votes	%	±%
Republican	Dan Bishop	96,573	50.69	▲1.44
Democratic	Dan McCready	92,785	48.70	▼0.23
Libertarian	Jeff Scott	773	0.41	▼1.40
Green	Allen Smith	375	0.20	
Total votes		190,506	100.00	
Republican hold				
