= 2019 North Carolina's 9th congressional district special election =

- September 10, 2019

North Carolina's 9th congressional district
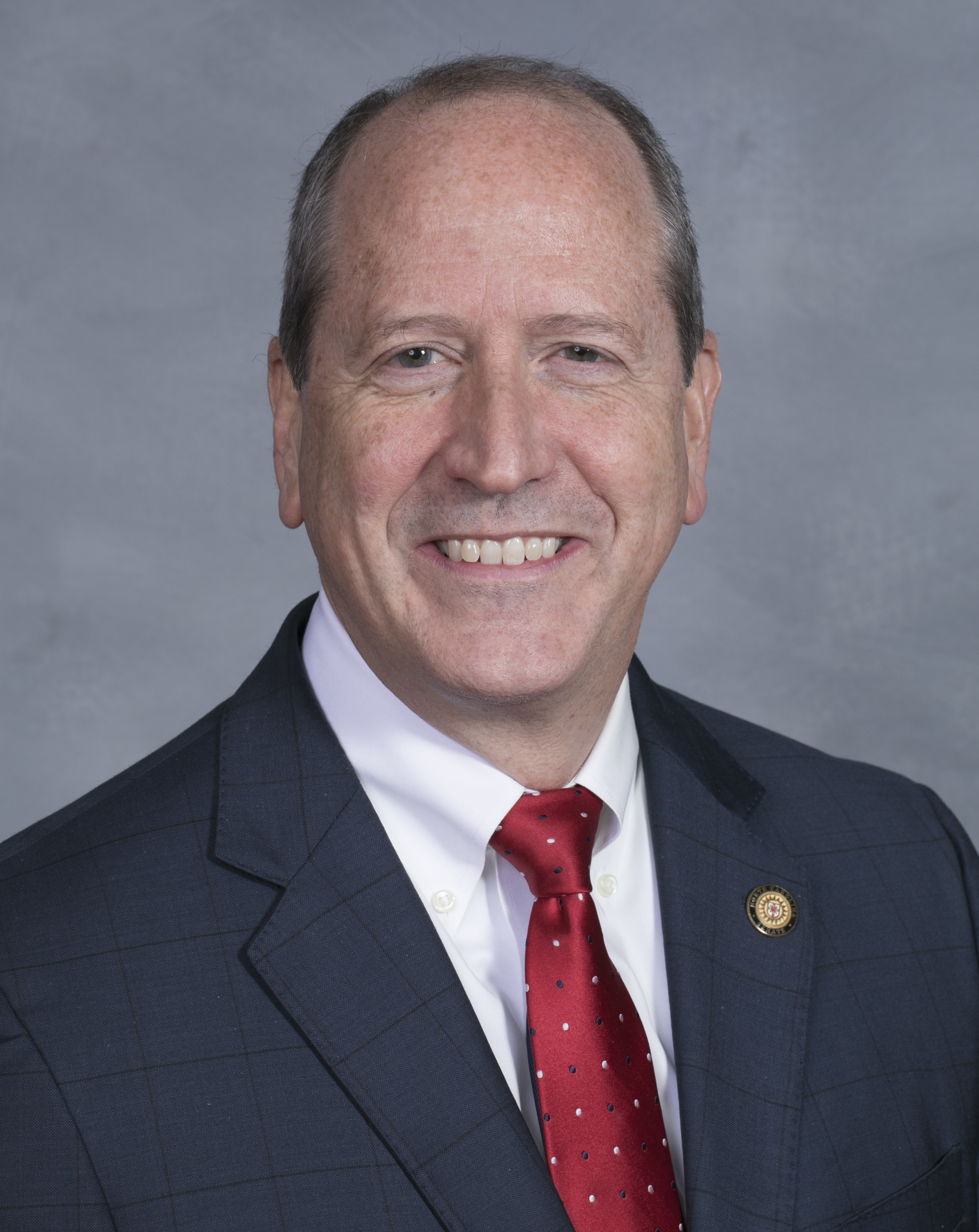

Nominee	Dan Bishop	Dan McCready
Party	Republican	Democratic
Popular vote	96,573	92,785
Percentage	50.69%	48.70%
- County results Bishop: 40–50% 50–60% McCready: 50–60%
U.S. Representative before election
Vacant
Republican
Elected U.S. Representative
Dan Bishop
Republican

A special election was held on September 10, 2019, to fill the vacancy in North Carolina's 9th congressional district in the United States House of Representatives for the remainder of the 116th United States Congress. The seat had been vacant since the opening of the 116th Congress, following the refusal of the North Carolina State Board of Elections to certify the results of the November 2018 election in the district due to allegations of electoral fraud. Because of the allegations, the race received substantial national attention.

In the original election, Mark Harris, a Republican, led Democrat Dan McCready by 905 votes in the unofficial returns for the 2018 North Carolina's 9th congressional district election. However, allegations of fraud in the election prevented its certification. After hearing evidence, including testimony from Harris himself and his own son, the board unanimously voted on February 21 to call a new election.

The primary was held on May 14, 2019, and the general election was held on September 10. A total of 10 Republican candidates qualified for the primary. Dan McCready, the Democratic Party nominee in the 2018 election, ran again and faced no primary opposition. Among Republicans, neither Harris nor Robert Pittenger, the incumbent whom Harris defeated in the 2018 primary election, filed to run.

After winning the Republican primary by a large margin, Dan Bishop narrowly won the general election, garnering 50.7% of the vote to McCready's 48.7%.

== Background ==
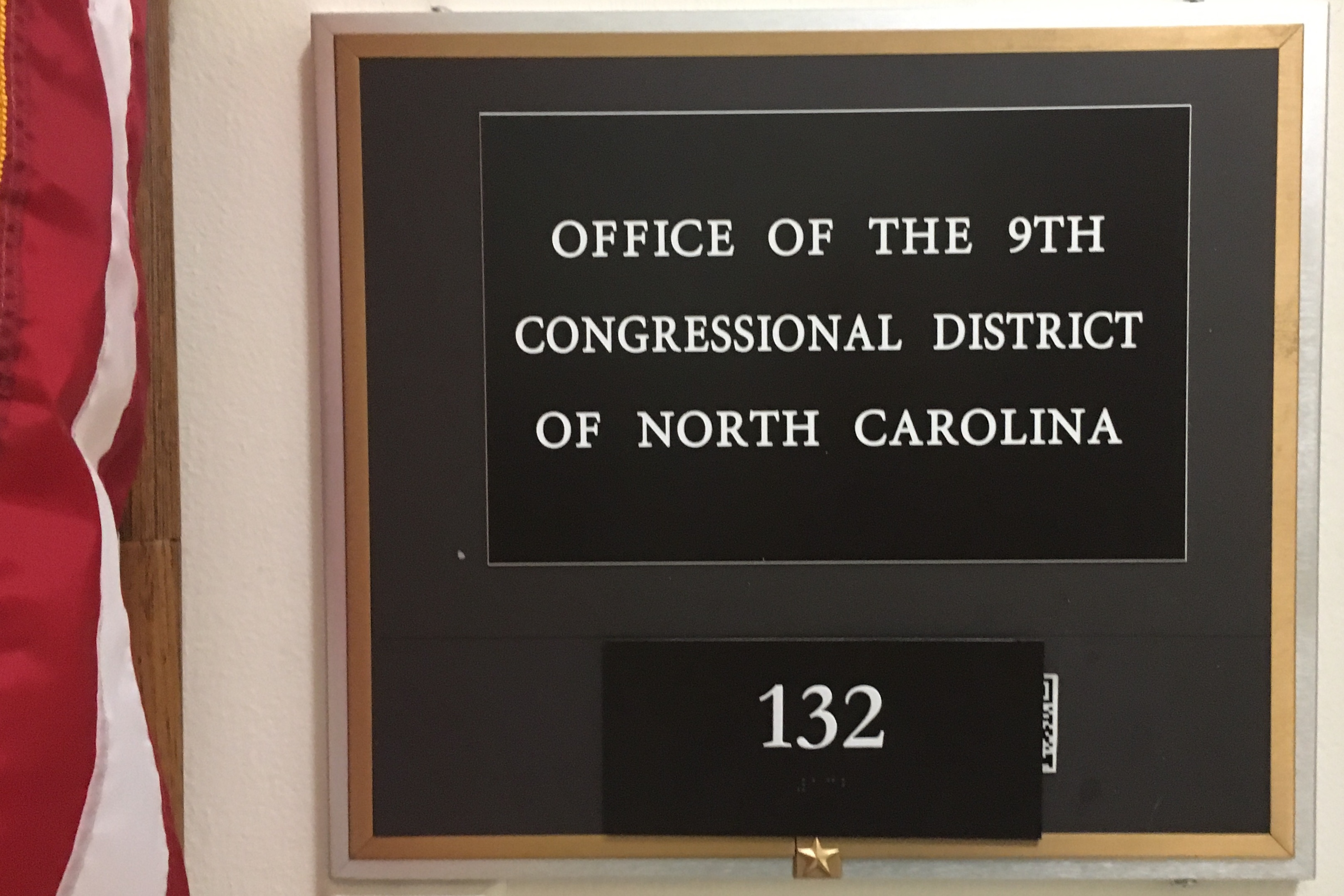
A House of Representatives office remained vacant, awaiting the winner of the disputed election.

The 2018 congressional district election ended with Republican Mark Harris leading Democrat Dan McCready by 905 votes, the closest race in the district in over sixty years. While McCready had conceded defeat, the North Carolina Democratic Party alleged that electoral fraud had taken place, and filed affidavits with the North Carolina State Board of Elections alleging that independent contractors working on behalf of Harris had illegally collected absentee ballots (ballot harvesting). The North Carolina Board of Elections voted unanimously not to certify the election and later ordered an evidentiary hearing to be held. The board also opened an investigation around the activities of Leslie McCrae Dowless, a campaign operative with felony fraud and perjury convictions, who was hired by the Harris campaign. Incoming Democratic Majority Leader Steny Hoyer announced that the United States House of Representatives would not seat Harris until the fraud investigation had been completed.

After a delay caused by restructuring of the Board of Elections and delayed appointment of members by Republican allies of Harris, the board set hearings to begin on February 18, 2019. On that day the regulator reported that it had found evidence of "a coordinated, unlawful and substantially resourced absentee ballot scheme" that may have involved more than 1,000 ballots or ballot request forms. On February 20, Harris's son, John Harris, a federal prosecutor in North Carolina, testified to the election board that he had repeatedly warned his father not to hire Dowless because Dowless appeared to have previously engaged in illegal tactics to win votes.

On February 21, Harris announced that "the public's confidence in the ninth district seat general election has been undermined to an extent that a new election is warranted." The Board of Elections voted unanimously to call a special election, with a primary if necessary on May 14, to fill the vacancy. This was the first House of Representatives election to require a do-over since 1974.

Dowless was indicted and arrested on February 27, 2019. He faced felony charges of obstruction of justice, conspiracy to commit obstruction of justice and two possession of absentee ballots charges. In July 2019, the Wake County district attorney also announced charges against Lisa Britt, Ginger S. Eason, Woody D. Hester, James Singletary, Jessica Dowless and Kelly Hendrix, and additional charges against Leslie McCrae Dowless.

== Republican primary ==
=== Candidates ===
==== Nominee ====
- Dan Bishop, attorney and state senator

==== Defeated in primary ====
- Chris Anglin, attorney and candidate for North Carolina Supreme Court in 2018
- Leigh Brown, realtor, CEO and author
- Kathie Day, realtor
- Gary Dunn, perennial candidate
- Matthew Ridenhour, former Mecklenburg County commissioner
- Stevie Rivenbark, businesswoman
- Stony Rushing, Union County commissioner
- Fern Shubert, former state senator and candidate for governor in 2004
- Albert Lee Wiley Jr., perennial candidate

==== Withdrew ====
- David Blackwelder, Wake Forest police officer and nominee for Wake County Board of Commissioners District 6 in 2018

==== Declined ====
- Dean Arp, state representative (endorsed Dan Bishop)
- Dan Barry, chair of the Union County Republican Party and candidate for North Carolina's 9th congressional district in 2012 (endorsed Dan Bishop)
- William M. Brawley, former state representative (endorsed Dan Bishop)
- Danny Britt, state senator (endorsed Dan Bishop)
- Andy Dulin, former state representative
- Mark Harris, pastor, nominee for North Carolina's 9th congressional district in 2018, candidate for North Carolina's 9th congressional district in 2016, and candidate for U.S. Senate in 2014 (endorsed Stony Rushing)
- Pat McCrory, former governor of North Carolina
- Robert Pittenger, former U.S. representative (endorsed Matthew Ridenhour)
- Kenny Smith, former Charlotte city councilman and nominee for mayor of Charlotte in 2017 (endorsed Dan Bishop)
- Nat Robertson, former mayor of Fayetteville, North Carolina
- Scott Stone, former state representative
- Tommy Tucker, former state senator (endorsed Dan Bishop)

=== Endorsements ===
Dan Bishop

Politicians

- Paul Bailey, Matthews mayor
- Karen Bentley, Mecklenburg County commissioner
- Rob Bryan, state representative
- Mike Cochrane, Mint Hill commissioner
- Ted Cruz, U.S. senator from Texas
- Dale Dalton, Mint Hill commissioner
- Barbara Dement, Matthews councilwoman
- Craig Horn, state representative
- Bill James, Mecklenburg County commissioner
- Tom McInnis, state senator
- Wesley Meredith, state senator
- Sue Myrick, former U.S. representative
- Richard Newton, Mint Hill commissioner
- Jim Puckett, Mecklenburg County commissioner
- Bob Rucho, state senator
- John Szoka, state representative
- Richard Vinroot, former Charlotte mayor

Organizations

- Club for Growth, national network for limited government and economic freedom
- North Carolina Values Coalition, non-partisan, statewide grassroots network of North Carolinians who support and advocate for pro-family positions
Matthew Ridenhour

Politicians

- Tariq Bokhari, Charlotte City Councilman
- Rand Paul, U.S. senator from Kentucky
- Ron Paul, former U.S. representative from Texas
- Robert Pittenger, former U.S. representative

=== Polling ===
Poll source	Date(s) administered	Sample size	Margin of error	Chris Anglin	Dan Bishop	Leigh Brown	Kathie Day	Gary Dunn	Matthew Ridenhour	Stevie Rivenbark	Stony Rushing	Fern Shubert	Other	Undecided
Public Policy Polling	April 29–30, 2019	592	± 5.1%	3%	31%	6%	5%	1%	9%	2%	17%	4%	–	21%
WPA Intelligence (R) (Note: Poll sponsored by Club for Growth Action)	April 29–30, 2019	409	± 4.9%	–	30%	5%	–	–	6%	1%	19%	2%	5%	32%
Meeting Street Research (R) (Note: Poll sponsored by the Dan Bishop campaign)	April 22–23, 2019	400	–	–	36%	3%	–	–	13%	–	18%	–	–	–
WPA Intelligence (R)	~April 9, 2019	–	–	–	22%	1%	–	–	6%	2%	18%	2%	3%	46%

=== Results ===
Results by county: Bishop—70–80% Bishop—60–70% Bishop—50–60% Bishop—40–50%

Republican primary results
Party	Candidate	Votes	%
Republican	Dan Bishop	14,405	47.68
Republican	Stony Rushing	5,882	19.47
Republican	Matthew Ridenhour	5,166	17.10
Republican	Leigh Brown	2,672	8.84
Republican	Stevie Rivenbark Hull	906	3.00
Republican	Fern Shubert	438	1.45
Republican	Chris Anglin	382	1.26
Republican	Kathie Day	193	0.64
Republican	Gary Dunn	105	0.35
Republican	Albert Lee Wiley Jr.	62	0.21
Total votes		30,211	100

== Democratic primary ==
=== Candidates ===
==== Declared ====
- Dan McCready, former U.S. Marine, businessman, and nominee for North Carolina's 9th congressional district in 2018

=== Endorsements ===
Dan McCready

Federal politicians

- Cory Booker, U.S. senator (D-NJ)
- Kirsten Gillibrand, U.S. senator (D-NY)
- Kamala Harris, U.S. senator (D-CA)
- Seth Moulton, U.S. representative (D-MA)
- Adam Schiff, U.S. representative (D-CA) and chairman of the United States House Permanent Select Committee on Intelligence
- Eric Swalwell, U.S. representative (D-CA)
- Elizabeth Warren, U.S. senator (D-MA)

Statewide and local politicians

- Dan Blue, state senate minority leader
- Pete Buttigieg, mayor of South Bend
- Jim Hunt, former governor of North Carolina
- Jeff Jackson, state senator
- Vi Lyles, mayor of Charlotte

Organizations

- Blue Dog Coalition
- League of Conservation Voters

== Libertarian primary ==
=== Candidates ===
==== Declared ====
- Jeff Scott, nominee for North Carolina's 9th congressional district in 2018

== Green primary ==
=== Candidates ===
==== Declared ====
- Allen Smith, perennial candidate

== General election ==
Dan McCready, the Democratic candidate, ran on a platform of cutting taxes on the middle class, ending gerrymandering, renegotiating trade deals, and reducing military interventions overseas. His platform also supports protecting Social Security and Medicare, overturning Citizens United, and granting full federal recognition to the Lumbee Tribe. Republican candidate Dan Bishop is best known for his opposition to LGBT rights, particularly the drafting of North Carolina's "Bathroom Bill".

During the early voting period for this election, Hurricane Dorian battered the eastern coast of the United States, necessitating early voting to be halted in several counties on the Outer Banks and elsewhere on the coast until the storm had passed.

=== Predictions ===
Source	Ranking	As of
The Cook Political Report	Tossup	September 6, 2019
Inside Elections	Tossup	September 4, 2019
Sabato's Crystal Ball	Tossup	September 5, 2019

=== Endorsements ===
Dan Bishop (R)

Federal politicians

- Ted Budd, U.S. representative (R-NC)
- Ted Cruz, U.S. senator (R-TX)
- Mark E. Green, U.S. representative (R-TN)
- Kevin McCarthy, House minority leader
- Mark Meadows, U.S. representative (R-NC)
- Sue Myrick, former U.S. representative (R-NC)
- Mike Pence, 48th vice president of the United States
- David Rouzer, U.S. representative (R-NC)
- Thom Tillis, U.S. senator (R-NC)
- Donald Trump, 45th president of the United States
- Mark Walker, U.S. representative (R-NC)

Statewide and local politicians

- Dean Arp, state representative
- Paul Bailey, Matthews mayor
- Karen Bentley, Mecklenburg County commissioner
- Rob Bryan, state representative
- Mike Cochrane, Mint Hill commissioner
- Dale Dalton, Mint Hill commissioner
- Barbara Dement, Matthews councilwoman
- Dan Forest, lieutenant governor of North Carolina
- D. Craig Horn, state representative
- Bill James, Mecklenburg County commissioner
- Todd Johnson, state senator
- Tom McInnis, state senator
- Wesley Meredith, state senator
- Richard Newton, Mint Hill commissioner
- Jim Puckett, Mecklenburg County commissioner
- Bob Rucho, state senator
- John Szoka, state representative
- Tommy Tucker, state senator
- Richard Vinroot, former mayor of Charlotte

Individuals

- Kimberly Guilfoyle, television news personality
- Ronna McDaniel, chair of the RNC
- Kayleigh McEnany, political commentator
- Donald Trump Jr., businessman

Organizations

- Club for Growth
- National Federation of Independent Business
- North Carolina Right to Life
- North Carolina Values Coalition
- NRA Political Victory Fund
- U.S. Chamber of Commerce
Dan McCready (D)

Federal politicians

- Alma Adams, U.S. representative (D-NC)
- Joe Biden, 47th vice president of the United States, former U.S. Senator (D-DE)
- Julian Castro, former U.S. Secretary of Housing and Urban Development
- Cory Booker, U.S. senator (D-NJ)
- Cheri Bustos, U.S. representative (D-IL)
- Sean Casten, U.S. representative (D-IL)
- Dwight Evans, U.S. representative (D-PA)
- Kirsten Gillibrand, U.S. senator (D-NY)
- Deb Haaland, U.S. representative (D-NM)
- Kamala Harris, U.S. senator (D-CA)
- Amy Klobuchar, U.S. senator (D-MN)
- Conor Lamb, U.S. representative (D-PA)
- Ted Lieu, U.S. representative (D-CA)
- Seth Moulton, U.S. representative (D-MA)
- Beto O'Rourke, former U.S. representative (D-TX)
- Adam Schiff, U.S. representative (D-CA) and chairman of the House Intelligence Committee
- Mikie Sherrill, U.S. representative (D-NJ)
- Abigail Spanberger, U.S. representative (D-VA)
- Eric Swalwell, U.S. representative (D-CA)
- Lauren Underwood, U.S. representative (D-IL)
- Elizabeth Warren, U.S. senator (D-MA)

Statewide and local politicians

- Dan Blue, state senate minority leader
- Steve Bullock, governor of Montana
- Pete Buttigieg, mayor of South Bend, Indiana
- Becky Carney, state representative
- Cal Cunningham, former state senator
- Harvey Gantt, former mayor of Charlotte
- Ken Goodman, commissioner of the North Carolina Industrial Commission; former state representative
- Wayne Goodwin, chairman of the North Carolina Democratic Party and former North Carolina Commissioner of Insurance
- Charles Graham, state representative
- Wesley Harris, state representative
- Jim Hunt, former governor of North Carolina
- Jeff Jackson, state senator
- Vi Lyles, mayor of Charlotte
- Natasha Marcus, state senator
- Gene McLaurin, former state senator and former mayor of Rockingham, North Carolina
- Robert F. Orr, former associate justice of the North Carolina Supreme Court (R)
- Erica D. Smith, state senator
- Jane W. Smith, former state senator
- Josh Stein, attorney general of North Carolina
- Terry Van Duyn, state senator

Organizations

- Blue Dog Coalition
- End Citizens United
- Equality North Carolina
- Human Rights Campaign
- Humane Society of the United States's Legislative Fund
- League of Conservation Voters
- National Wildlife Federation's Action Fund
- New Democrat Coalition
- New Politics
- North Carolina Association of Educators
- Sierra Club North Carolina Chapter
- VoteVets.org

Individuals

- Morris Davis, former Air Force officer
- Grey DeLisle, actress
- Jennifer Hale, actress
- Gina Ortiz Jones, political candidate
- Stanley A. McChrystal, former Army general
- Evan McMullin, former political candidate
- Debra Messing, actress
- Michael Moore, filmmaker
- Malcolm Nance, former Navy officer
- Piper Perabo, actress
- Tom Perez, chair of the DNC
- Robbie Rist, actor and activist
- Nell Scovell, writer
- Neera Tanden, policy advisor

Newspapers & news websites

- The Charlotte Observer

=== Polling ===
Poll source	Date(s) administered	Sample size	Margin of error	Dan Bishop (R)	Dan McCready (D)	Other	Undecided
co/efficient	September 5–6, 2019	1,175 LV	± 3.9%	45%	48%	–	7%
co/efficient	September 5–6, 2019	1,175 LV	± 3.9%	44%	44%	5% (Note: Scott (L) with 3% and Smith (G) with 2%)	7%
GAJ Solutions (R) (Note: Poll conducted for RedRacingHorses)	August 26–28, 2019	500	± 4.0%	46%	45%	3% (Note: Scott (L) with 2% and Smith (G) with 1%)	5%
Harper Polling/Clarity Campaign Labs (Note: Poll conducted for Inside Elections)	August 26–28, 2019	551 LV	± 4.2%	42%	46%	3%	8%
ALG Research (D) (Note: McCready internal)	July 15–18, 2019	450 LV	± 4.6%	46%	46%	–	8%
Atlantic Media & Research (R) (Note: Poll sponsored by an unknown Republican client)	May 20–30, 2019	358 LV	± 5.2%	39%	41%	3% (Note: Scott (L) with 2% and Smith (G) with 0.8%)	16.8%
JMC Analytics	May 21–24, 2019	350 LV	± 5.2%	46%	42%	2% (Note: Scott (L) and Smith (G) each with 1%)	10%

Hypothetical polling

with Mark Harris

Poll source	Date(s) administered	Sample size	Margin of error	Mark Harris (R)	Dan McCready (D)	Undecided
Atlantic Media & Research	December 2018	–	–	43%	46%	11%

with generic Republican and Dan McCready

Poll source	Date(s) administered	Sample size	Margin of error	Generic Republican	Dan McCready (D)	Other	Undecided
JMC Analytics	May 21–24, 2019	350	± 5.2%	52%	41%	2%	2%
DCCC Targeting and Analytics (D) (Note: Poll sponsored by the Democratic Congressional Campaign Committee)	February 24–25, 2019	518	± 4.3%	46%	50%	–	–

with generic Republican and generic Democrat

Poll source	Date(s) administered	Sample size	Margin of error	Generic Republican	Generic Democrat	Undecided
Atlantic Media & Research	May 20–30, 2019	358	± 5.2%	46%	38%	16%
Atlantic Media & Research	December 2018	–	–	45%	36%	19%

=== Fundraising ===
Campaign finance reports as of August 21, 2019
Candidate (party)	Total receipts	Total disbursements	Cash on hand
Dan McCready (D)	$4,950,881.11	$4,470,374.25	$818,345.51
Dan Bishop (R)	$1,954,334.64	$1,761,558.40	$192,776.24
Source: Federal Election Commission

=== Results ===
North Carolina's 9th congressional district special election, 2019
Party	Candidate	Votes	%	±%
Republican	Dan Bishop	96,573	50.69	+1.44
Democratic	Dan McCready	92,785	48.70	−0.23
Libertarian	Jeff Scott	773	0.41	−1.40
Green	Allen Smith	375	0.20	N/A
Total votes		190,506	100.00	N/A
Republican hold				

=== County results ===
Vote breakdown by county
	Dan Bishop Republican		Dan McCready Democrat		Jeff Scott Libertarian		Allen Smith Green		Total
County	Votes	%	Votes	%	Votes	%	Votes	%	Votes
Anson	2,381	42.67%	3,173	56.86%	15	0.27%	11	0.20%	5,580
Bladen	3,496	59.32%	2,371	40.23%	15	0.25%	11	0.19%	5,893
Cumberland	7,498	49.85%	7,471	49.67%	42	0.28%	31	0.21%	15,042
Mecklenburg	28,862	43.42%	37,193	55.96%	272	0.41%	140	0.21%	66,467
Richmond	4,727	51.96%	4,309	47.37%	39	0.43%	22	0.24%	9,097
Robeson	10,378	49.08%	10,669	50.45%	58	0.27%	41	0.19%	21,146
Scotland	2,816	43.29%	3,655	56.19%	21	0.32%	13	0.20%	6,505
Union	36,415	59.92%	23,944	39.40%	311	0.51%	106	0.17%	60,776

== Notes ==
Partisan clients

Additional candidates
