= McCrae Dowless =

American political operative (1956–2022)

Leslie McCrae Dowless Jr. (January 3, 1956 – April 24, 2022) was a Republican political operative from the state of North Carolina. Dowless was at the center of a fraud investigation following the 2018 North Carolina's 9th congressional district election. In February 2019, North Carolina's election commission determined that the doubts surrounding the integrity of the election were sufficiently serious that the election results should be invalidated and a new election held. In 1990, Dowless had been convicted of felony perjury, and in 1992, he was convicted of felony insurance fraud.

== Early life ==
Leslie McCrae Dowless Jr. was born on January 3, 1956, to Leslie McCrae Dowless Sr. and Monnie Margie Pait. He was the only child they had together, but had ten older half-siblings his parents had from other relationships. He was raised on a Columbus County, North Carolina, peanut farm until he was 10 years old, when his family moved to Bladenboro.

== Career ==
=== Insurance fraud conviction ===
In 1990, Dowless was convicted of felony perjury, and in 1992, he was convicted of felony insurance fraud. He was sentenced to two years in prison for the latter charge, and served six months.

=== Political involvement ===
Dowless began working in politics in 2006, focusing on get out the vote efforts. In 2006, he worked for Rex Gore's campaign for district attorney of Bladen County. Over the next couple of years, Dowless was paid thousands of dollars for getting out the vote efforts and, at times, for managing the campaigns of eastern North Carolina candidates Wesley Meredith, Al Leonard, Ken Waddell, and William Brisson.

In 2010, Dowless worked for Harold Butch Pope's campaign for district attorney.

Dowless himself was elected to the Bladen County Soil and Water Conservation Board in 2012. He was then re-elected in 2016. Also in 2014, Dowless worked for Jim McVicker's campaign for sheriff. McVicker won by a small margin, and allegations were made about mishandled absentee ballots.

In the 2016 elections for U.S. House of Representatives, Dowless worked for Todd Johnson in the Republican Party primary election. Johnson finished third behind incumbent Robert Pittenger and Mark Harris. After the election, Dowless filed a complaint with the North Carolina Board of Elections suggesting that Johnson's opponents had committed fraud with absentee ballots. In turn, two voters filed complaints of voter fraud against Dowless.

=== 2018 North Carolina's 9th congressional district election ===
After noticing that Todd Johnson had won the absentee vote in Bladen County in 2016, Mark Harris had a consulting company, Red Dome Group (Lead Partner Andy Yates) hire Dowless to work on his 2018 campaign. Harris also introduced Dowless to a Republican candidate running for Charlotte City Council in 2017.

In the 2018 primary election, Harris defeated Pittenger. Doubts later surfaced regarding Dowless' role in absentee balloting in the primary; Harris received 437 of the 456 absentee votes cast in Bladen County.

In the general election against Democratic Party nominee Dan McCready, Harris was the unofficial winner by 905 votes. However, the North Carolina State Board of Elections refused to certify the results of the election. Dowless was accused of paying workers to illegally collect absentee ballots from voters and was considered a "person of interest" in the investigation over mishandled absentee ballots. On February 4, the newly seated state elections board set an evidentiary hearing to begin on February 18.

==== Ballot fraud ====
On the first day of the evidentiary hearing, state elections director Kim Strach said the evidence would show that "a coordinated, unlawful and substantially resourced absentee ballot scheme operated in the 2018 general election". Lisa Britt, the daughter of Dowless's ex-wife as well as one of his employees, said Dowless and his associates had collected ballots from voters. She then testified that the ballots were kept at Dowless' home or office for several days or longer, and that operatives would fill in votes on parts or all of some ballots to favor Republican candidates in the election. She also said they had forged some witness signatures and that they had followed the direction of Dowless to take steps to avoid detection, including controlling the color of the pens used for the witness signatures, signing a different person's name as a witness to avoid having the same person as witness to too many ballots, making sure to deliver no more than nine ballots in each visit to the post office, and making sure to use post offices near where the voters lived. Britt also said she had personally voted despite being on probation for a felony conviction and that she had taken advice from Dowless about how to do that.

Dowless himself was present at the hearing but refused to testify without being granted immunity from prosecution.

==== New election ====
On February 21, the Board of Elections unanimously voted to order a new election in the congressional race. The Board also ordered new elections in two other contests for local offices. On February 26, 2019, citing ill health, Harris declared that he would not compete in the new election.

==== Arrest ====
On February 27, 2019, Dowless was arrested after being indicted by a Wake County grand jury. Dowless was charged with multiple counts related to illegal ballot handling and obstructing justice in the 2016 and 2018 elections. An additional four people who worked for him were also charged. In July, additional charges of perjury and solicitation to commit perjury were added in a superseding indictment.

==== Fraud conviction ====
On April 7, 2020, Dowless was indicted on federal charges "tangentially related to the ballot probe" being investigated by the State Board of Elections. In the indictment, unsealed on April 21, prosecutors alleged that Dowless claimed disability and retirement benefits in 2017 and 2018, but failed to tell the Social Security Administration about over $132,000 in payments he received for working on the Harris campaign and one other campaign in the 2018 cycle.

In June 2021, Dowless pled guilty to two charges. He was convicted of government theft and defrauding the government. He was sentenced to six months in prison and fined more than $8500.

== Death ==
Dowless died on April 24, 2022, at his daughter's home in Bladen County following a diagnosis with lung cancer. The legal charges against him were formally dropped by prosecutors upon his death. A funeral was held at Center Road Baptist Church on April 30 in Bladen County and he was subsequently buried. Journalists Michael Graff and Nick Ochsner wrote, "Dowless was a lot of things to a lot of people. To Democrats, he was despicable, a Republican who tried to undermine democracy. To Republicans, he was a low-level fall guy who proved how easy it was to undermine democracy. In his two-decade political career, Dowless had worked for candidates on both sides of the aisle, and in the end he was put out of both."

== Works cited ==
- Graff, Michael; Ochsner, Nick (2021). The Vote Collectors: The True Story of the Scamsters, Politicians, and Preachers behind the Nation's Greatest Electoral Fraud. Chapel Hill: UNC Press Books. ISBN 9781469665573.
