= North Carolina's 9th congressional district =

U.S. House district for North Carolina

Coordinates: 35.38°N 79.41°W

- Interactive map of district boundaries since January 3, 2025 (Note: As the mid-decade redistricting bill (S249) enacted on October 22, 2025 only changed the compositions of North Carolina's 1st and 3rd congressional districts, boundaries of other districts will not change at the 2026 elections.)
- Representative: Richard Hudson; R–Southern Pines
- Population (2025): 785,793
- Median household income: $73,365
- Ethnicity: 58.7% White; 20.8% Black; 12.6% Hispanic; 4.4% Two or more races; 1.9% Asian; 1.0% Native American; 0.6% other
- Cook PVI: R+8

North Carolina's 9th congressional district is a congressional district in south-central North Carolina. The entire counties of Alamance, Hoke, Moore, and Randolph counties as well as portions of Chatham, Cumberland, and Guilford counties including most of Fayetteville, and a very small portion of Greensboro.

From 1969 to 2023, the district was anchored in Charlotte. Republican Robert Pittenger had represented the district since January 2013. In February 2016 a U.S. District Court overturned the existing boundaries at the time because of politically directed gerrymandering that suppressed minority representation. In 2018, Pittenger was defeated by challenger Mark Harris in the Republican primary. The latter faced Democrat Dan McCready in the general election.

Harris was initially called as the winner by several hundred votes, but the result was not certified, pending a statewide investigation into allegations of absentee ballot fraud. On February 21, the bipartisan State Election Board unanimously voted to call for a new election for the 9th district, because of ballot fraud by Republican operatives.

A special election was held September 10, 2019, with Democrat Dan McCready running against Republican Dan Bishop, a state senator who won the Republican primary. Bishop won the 2019 special election to the U.S. House of Representatives with 50.7% of the vote to McCready's 48.7%.

Candidate filing began February 24, 2022 after the North Carolina Supreme Court approved a new map that was only used for the 2022 United States House of Representatives elections in North Carolina, which had changed the 9th district boundaries to include Chatham, Hoke, Lee, Moore, Randolph and Scotland Counties and parts of Cumberland, Harnett and Richmond Counties.

The ninth district is currently represented by Richard Hudson.

== Counties ==
For the 119th and successive Congresses (based on the districts drawn following a 2023 legislative session), the district contains all or portions of the following counties and communities.

Alamance County (14)

All 14 communities

Chatham County (6)

Bennett, Cary (part; also 2nd, 4th, and 13th; shared with Durham and Wake counties), Goldston, Gulf, Moncure, Siler City

Cumberland County (2)

Fayetteville (part; also 7th), Spring Lake

Guilford County (11)

Archdale (part; also 6th; shared with Randolph County), Forest Oaks, Gibsonville (shared with Alamance County), Greensboro (part; also 5th and 6th), High Point (part; also 6th; shared with Davidson, Forsyth, and Randolph counties), Jamestown (part; also 6th), McLeansville, Pleasant Garden, Sedalia, Summerfield (part; also 5th), Whitsett

Hoke County (7)

All seven communities

Moore County (13)

All 13 communities

Randolph County (11)

All 11 communities

== Recent election results from statewide races ==
Year	Office	Results
2008	President	McCain 54% - 44%
2008	Senate	Hagan 49% - 48%
2008	Governor	McCrory 50% - 47%
2010	Senate	Burr 60% - 37%
2012	President	Romney 57% - 43%
2012	Governor	McCrory 59% - 39%
2014	Senate	Tillis 56% - 40%
2016	President	Trump 57% - 40%
2016	Senate	Burr 57% - 39%
2016	Governor	McCrory 55% - 43%
2016	Lt. Governor	Forest 58% - 39%
2016	Secretary of State	LaPaglia 54% - 46%
2016	Auditor	Stuber 56% - 44%
2016	Treasurer	Folwell 58% - 42%
2016	Attorney General	Newton 56% - 44%
2020	President	Trump 56% - 42%
2020	Senate	Tillis 54% - 41%
2020	Governor	Forest 52% - 46%
2020	Lt. Governor	Robinson 58% - 42%
2020	Secretary of State	Sykes 55% - 45%
2020	Auditor	Street 55% - 45%
2020	Treasurer	Folwell 58% - 42%
2020	Attorney General	O'Neill 56% - 44%
2022	Senate	Budd 58% - 40%
2024	President	Trump 57% - 41%
2024	Governor	Stein 49% - 46%
2024	Lt. Governor	Weatherman 54% - 43%
2024	Secretary of State	Brown 55% - 45%
2024	Auditor	Boliek 56% - 41%
2024	Treasurer	Briner 58% - 42%
2024	Attorney General	Bishop 55% - 45%

== List of members representing the district ==
Member (Residence)	Party	Years	Cong ress	Electoral history	District location
District established March 4, 1793
Thomas Blount (Tarboro)	Anti-Administration	March 4, 1793 – March 3, 1795	3rd 4th 5th	Elected in 1793. Re-elected in 1795. Re-elected in 1796. Lost re-election.	1793–1803 [data missing]
Thomas Blount (Tarboro)	Democratic-Republican	March 4, 1795 – March 3, 1799	3rd 4th 5th	Elected in 1793. Re-elected in 1795. Re-elected in 1796. Lost re-election.	1793–1803 [data missing]
Willis Alston (Butterwood)	Federalist	March 4, 1799 – March 3, 1803	6th 7th	Elected in 1798. Re-elected in 1800. Redistricted to the 2nd district.	1793–1803 [data missing]
Marmaduke Williams (Caswell County)	Democratic-Republican	March 4, 1803 – March 3, 1809	8th 9th 10th	Elected in 1803. Re-elected in 1804. Re-elected in 1806. Retired.	1803–1813 "North Carolina congressional district map (1803–13)".
James Cochran (Roxboro)	Democratic-Republican	March 4, 1809 – March 3, 1813	11th 12th	Elected in 1808. Re-elected in 1810. Retired.	1803–1813 "North Carolina congressional district map (1803–13)".
Bartlett Yancey (Caswell)	Democratic-Republican	March 4, 1813 – March 3, 1817	13th 14th	Elected in 1813. Re-elected in 1815. Retired.	1813–1823 "North Carolina congressional district map (1813–43)".
Thomas Settle (Lenox Castle)	Democratic-Republican	March 4, 1817 – March 3, 1821	15th 16th	Elected in 1817. Re-elected in 1819. Retired.	1813–1823 "North Carolina congressional district map (1813–43)".
Romulus M. Saunders (Milton)	Democratic-Republican (Note: Supported the Crawford faction in the 1824 United States presidential election.)	March 4, 1821 – March 3, 1825	17th 18th 19th	Elected in 1821. Re-elected in 1823. Re-elected in 1825. Retired.	1813–1823 "North Carolina congressional district map (1813–43)".
Romulus M. Saunders (Milton)	Democratic-Republican	March 4, 1821 – March 3, 1825	17th 18th 19th	Elected in 1821. Re-elected in 1823. Re-elected in 1825. Retired.	1823–1833 "North Carolina congressional district map (1813–43)".
Romulus M. Saunders (Milton)	Jacksonian	March 4, 1825 – March 3, 1827	17th 18th 19th	Elected in 1821. Re-elected in 1823. Re-elected in 1825. Retired.	1823–1833 "North Carolina congressional district map (1813–43)".
Augustine H. Shepperd (Bethania)	Jacksonian	March 4, 1827 – March 3, 1833	20th 21st 22nd 23rd 24th 25th	Elected in 1827. Re-elected in 1829. Re-elected in 1831. Re-elected in 1833. Re-elected in 1835. Re-elected in 1837. [data missing]	1823–1833 "North Carolina congressional district map (1813–43)".
Augustine H. Shepperd (Bethania)	Anti-Jacksonian	March 4, 1833 – March 3, 1837	20th 21st 22nd 23rd 24th 25th	Elected in 1827. Re-elected in 1829. Re-elected in 1831. Re-elected in 1833. Re-elected in 1835. Re-elected in 1837. [data missing]	1833–1843 "North Carolina congressional district map (1813–43)".
Augustine H. Shepperd (Bethania)	Whig	March 4, 1837 – March 3, 1839	20th 21st 22nd 23rd 24th 25th	Elected in 1827. Re-elected in 1829. Re-elected in 1831. Re-elected in 1833. Re-elected in 1835. Re-elected in 1837. [data missing]	1833–1843 "North Carolina congressional district map (1813–43)".
John Hill (Germantown)	Democratic	March 4, 1839 – March 3, 1841	26th	Elected in 1839. [data missing]	1833–1843 "North Carolina congressional district map (1813–43)".
Augustine H. Shepperd (Salem)	Whig	March 4, 1841 – March 3, 1843	27th	Elected in 1841. [data missing]	1833–1843 "North Carolina congressional district map (1813–43)".
Kenneth Rayner (Winton)	Whig	March 4, 1843 – March 3, 1845	28th	Redistricted from the 1st district and re-elected in 1843. [data missing]	1843–1853 [data missing]
Asa Biggs (Williamston)	Democratic	March 4, 1845 – March 3, 1847	29th	Elected in 1845. [data missing]	1843–1853 [data missing]
David Outlaw (Windsor)	Whig	March 4, 1847 – March 3, 1853	30th 31st 32nd	Elected in 1847. Re-elected in 1849. Re-elected in 1851. [data missing]	1843–1853 [data missing]
District dissolved March 3, 1853
District re-established March 4, 1885
Thomas D. Johnston (Asheville)	Democratic	March 4, 1885 – March 3, 1889	49th 50th	Elected in 1884. Re-elected in 1886. [data missing]	1885–1893 [data missing]
Hamilton G. Ewart (Hendersonville)	Republican	March 4, 1889 – March 3, 1891	51st	Elected in 1888. [data missing]	1885–1893 [data missing]
William T. Crawford (Waynesville)	Democratic	March 4, 1891 – March 3, 1895	52nd 53rd	Elected in 1890. Re-elected in 1892. [data missing]	1885–1893 [data missing]
William T. Crawford (Waynesville)	Democratic	March 4, 1891 – March 3, 1895	52nd 53rd	Elected in 1890. Re-elected in 1892. [data missing]	1893–1903 [data missing]
Richmond Pearson (Asheville)	Republican	March 4, 1895 – March 3, 1899	54th 55th	Elected in 1894. Re-elected in 1896. [data missing]	1893–1903 [data missing]
William T. Crawford (Waynesville)	Democratic	March 4, 1899 – May 10, 1900	56th	Lost contested election.	1893–1903 [data missing]
Richmond Pearson (Asheville)	Republican	May 10, 1900 – March 3, 1901	56th	Won contested election. [data missing]	1893–1903 [data missing]
James M. Moody (Waynesville)	Republican	March 4, 1901 – February 5, 1903	57th	Elected in 1900. Died.	1893–1903 [data missing]
Vacant		February 5, 1903 – March 3, 1903	57th		1893–1903 [data missing]
Edwin Y. Webb (Shelby)	Democratic	March 4, 1903 – November 10, 1919	58th 59th 60th 61st 62nd 63rd 64th 65th 66th	Elected in 1902. Re-elected in 1904. Re-elected in 1906. Re-elected in 1908. Re-elected in 1910. Re-elected in 1912. Re-elected in 1914. Re-elected in 1916. Re-elected in 1918. Resigned.	
Edwin Y. Webb (Shelby)	Democratic	March 4, 1903 – November 10, 1919	58th 59th 60th 61st 62nd 63rd 64th 65th 66th	Elected in 1902. Re-elected in 1904. Re-elected in 1906. Re-elected in 1908. Re-elected in 1910. Re-elected in 1912. Re-elected in 1914. Re-elected in 1916. Re-elected in 1918. Resigned.	1903–1913 [data missing]
Edwin Y. Webb (Shelby)	Democratic	March 4, 1903 – November 10, 1919	58th 59th 60th 61st 62nd 63rd 64th 65th 66th	Elected in 1902. Re-elected in 1904. Re-elected in 1906. Re-elected in 1908. Re-elected in 1910. Re-elected in 1912. Re-elected in 1914. Re-elected in 1916. Re-elected in 1918. Resigned.	1913–1933 [data missing]
Vacant		November 10, 1919 – December 16, 1919	66th		1913–1933 [data missing]
Clyde R. Hoey (Shelby)	Democratic	December 16, 1919 – March 3, 1921	66th	Elected to finish Webb's term. [data missing]	1913–1933 [data missing]
Alfred L. Bulwinkle (Gastonia)	Democratic	March 4, 1921 – March 3, 1929	67th 68th 69th 70th	Elected in 1920. Re-elected in 1922. Re-elected in 1924. Re-elected in 1926. Lost re-election.	1913–1933 [data missing]
Charles A. Jonas (Lincolnton)	Republican	March 4, 1929 – March 3, 1931	71st	Elected in 1928. [data missing]	1913–1933 [data missing]
Alfred L. Bulwinkle (Gastonia)	Democratic	March 4, 1931 – March 3, 1933	72nd	Elected in 1930. Redistricted to the 10th district.	1913–1933 [data missing]
Robert L. Doughton (Laurel Springs)	Democratic	March 4, 1933 – January 3, 1953	73rd 74th 75th 76th 77th 78th 79th 80th 81st 82nd	Redistricted from the 8th district and re-elected in 1932. Re-elected in 1934. Re-elected in 1936. Re-elected in 1938. Re-elected in 1940. Re-elected in 1942. Re-elected in 1944. Re-elected in 1946. Re-elected in 1948. Re-elected in 1950. [data missing]	1933–1943 [data missing]
Robert L. Doughton (Laurel Springs)	Democratic	March 4, 1933 – January 3, 1953	73rd 74th 75th 76th 77th 78th 79th 80th 81st 82nd	Redistricted from the 8th district and re-elected in 1932. Re-elected in 1934. Re-elected in 1936. Re-elected in 1938. Re-elected in 1940. Re-elected in 1942. Re-elected in 1944. Re-elected in 1946. Re-elected in 1948. Re-elected in 1950. [data missing]	1943–1953 [data missing]
Hugh Quincy Alexander (Kannapolis)	Democratic	January 3, 1953 – January 3, 1963	83rd 84th 85th 86th 87th	Elected in 1952. Re-elected in 1954. Re-elected in 1956. Re-elected in 1958. Re-elected in 1960. Lost re-election.	1953–1963 [data missing]
Jim Broyhill (Lenoir)	Republican	January 3, 1963 – January 3, 1969	88th 89th 90th	Redistricted from the 10th district and re-elected in 1962. Re-elected in 1964. Re-elected in 1966. Redistricted to the 10th district.	1963–1973 [data missing]
Charles R. Jonas (Lincolnton)	Republican	January 3, 1969 – January 3, 1973	91st 92nd	Redistricted from the 8th district and Re-elected in 1968. Re-elected in 1970. Retired.	1963–1973 [data missing]
James G. Martin (Davidson)	Republican	January 3, 1973 – January 3, 1985	93rd 94th 95th 96th 97th 98th	Elected in 1972. Re-elected in 1974. Re-elected in 1976. Re-elected in 1978. Re-elected in 1980. Re-elected in 1982. Retired to run for governor of North Carolina.	1973–1983 [data missing]
James G. Martin (Davidson)	Republican	January 3, 1973 – January 3, 1985	93rd 94th 95th 96th 97th 98th	Elected in 1972. Re-elected in 1974. Re-elected in 1976. Re-elected in 1978. Re-elected in 1980. Re-elected in 1982. Retired to run for governor of North Carolina.	1983–1993 [data missing]
Alex McMillan (Charlotte)	Republican	January 3, 1985 – January 3, 1995	99th 100th 101st 102nd 103rd	Elected in 1984. Re-elected in 1986. Re-elected in 1988. Re-elected in 1990. Re-elected in 1992. Retired.	1983–1993 [data missing]
Alex McMillan (Charlotte)	Republican	January 3, 1985 – January 3, 1995	99th 100th 101st 102nd 103rd	Elected in 1984. Re-elected in 1986. Re-elected in 1988. Re-elected in 1990. Re-elected in 1992. Retired.	1993–2003 [data missing]
Sue Myrick (Charlotte)	Republican	January 3, 1995 – January 3, 2013	104th 105th 106th 107th 108th 109th 110th 111th 112th	Elected in 1994. Re-elected in 1996. Re-elected in 1998. Re-elected in 2000. Re-elected in 2002. Re-elected in 2004. Re-elected in 2006. Re-elected in 2008. Re-elected in 2010. Retired.	1993–2003 [data missing]
Sue Myrick (Charlotte)	Republican	January 3, 1995 – January 3, 2013	104th 105th 106th 107th 108th 109th 110th 111th 112th	Elected in 1994. Re-elected in 1996. Re-elected in 1998. Re-elected in 2000. Re-elected in 2002. Re-elected in 2004. Re-elected in 2006. Re-elected in 2008. Re-elected in 2010. Retired.	2003–2013
Robert Pittenger (Charlotte)	Republican	January 3, 2013 – January 3, 2019	113th 114th 115th	Elected in 2012. Re-elected in 2014. Re-elected in 2016. Lost renomination.	2013–2017
Robert Pittenger (Charlotte)	Republican	January 3, 2013 – January 3, 2019	113th 114th 115th	Elected in 2012. Re-elected in 2014. Re-elected in 2016. Lost renomination.	2017–2021
Vacant		January 3, 2019 – September 10, 2019	116th	Election voided.	2017–2021
Dan Bishop (Charlotte)	Republican	September 10, 2019 – January 3, 2023	116th 117th	Elected to the vacant term. Re-elected in 2020. Redistricted to the 8th district.	2017–2021
Dan Bishop (Charlotte)	Republican	September 10, 2019 – January 3, 2023	116th 117th	Elected to the vacant term. Re-elected in 2020. Redistricted to the 8th district.	2021–2023 Static map of 2021-3 congressional district
Richard Hudson (Southern Pines)	Republican	January 3, 2023 – present	118th 119th	Redistricted from the 8th district and Re-elected in 2022. Re-elected in 2024. Lost re-election.	2023–2025
Richard Hudson (Southern Pines)	Republican	January 3, 2023 – present	118th 119th	Redistricted from the 8th district and Re-elected in 2022. Re-elected in 2024. Lost re-election.	2025–present
Richard Ojeda (Aberdeen)	Democratic	Taking office on January 3, 2027		Elected in 2026.	

== 2018 voter fraud ==
In the Republican primary incumbent Robert Pittenger was defeated by former pastor Mark Harris, who had closely challenged him two years earlier. Harris won 48.5 percent of the vote to Pittenger's 46.2 percent.

The New York Times described the election between Harris and Democrat Dan McCready as a "top-tier contest". In results on election day, Harris defeated McCready by 905 votes, but on November 27, 2018, the North Carolina State Board of Elections and Ethics Reform declined to certify the election results, citing voting irregularities involving absentee ballots. The irregularities in counting and handling of absentee ballots became the subject of a criminal investigation.

Outlets such as the Associated Press and FiveThirtyEight subsequently retracted calling the race, pending the decision of the state board of elections. On December 1, the chair of the state elections board resigned, saying: "The investigation of criminal conduct and absentee voting fraud in the 2018 Republican primary and 2018 general election in congressional district 9 is a matter of vital importance to our democracy", adding that "I will not allow myself to be used as an instrument of distraction in this investigation".

On November 30, the election board of the district decided to hear evidence about "claims of numerous irregularities and concerted fraudulent activities" at a meeting to be held by December 21. A finding of fraud could have resulted in a new election.

On December 5, 2018, independent investigative reporting of the alleged vote thefts detailed a practice that targeted southern rural elderly black voters in the 9th district congressional race and termed the affair, "...the most serious federal election tampering case in years." Campaign workers revealed that the vote tampering went on in a pervasively chaotic atmosphere. Operatives tracked votes and field workers "...would come to your house, they would get you to fill out an absentee ballot to be sent to your house. They would go back and pick it up and then seal it and then find two witnesses," to certify their validity. Such handling of ballots and completed applications by other than board and postal workers is legally prohibited. An informant tabulated the number of ballots delivered to the county election board and said an indicted leader gave the Harris campaign updates on the operation's most recent totals. The leader was employed by Red Dome political consultants which received over $428,000 from the Harris campaign. The informant had delivered 185 absentee ballot applications and the leader personally delivered 592 more. On December 6, Democratic candidate McCready withdrew his earlier submitted election concession. Republican candidate Harris agreed for a new election to be held if allegations of election fraud could be proven by the election board to have affected the contest's outcome. The leader of the North Carolina Republicans, Robin Hayes, stated on December 11 that, regardless to what extent election fraud could be proven to have altered the election, a new election would be necessary in the state's 9th congressional district if investigators can verify a local newspaper report that early voting results in Bladen County were leaked before Election Day.

On December 28, the state court dissolved the state election board, before it had certified election results. The election board's staff announced that it would continue the investigation, but delayed hearings until a new election board was seated, presumably on January 31. Democratic Governor Roy Cooper's attempts to fill an interim board were overridden by the Republican-controlled legislature. Incoming United States House of Representatives Majority Leader Steny Hoyer, a Democrat, announced that the House of Representatives would not seat Harris under any circumstances until the fraud investigation is completed. Harris announced he would seek court intervention to have him immediately certified as the winner and stated his intention to join the 116th Congress on January 3. However, Harris was not permitted to join the new Congress on January 3.

On February 21, the bipartisan state board of elections voted to hold a new election, because, according to board chairman Bob Cordle, "irregularities and improprieties ... tainted the results ... and cast doubt on its fairness." A newly passed law by the North Carolina state legislature will require the parties to hold new primaries before the general election for this seat. Harris has said that he will not run again.

=== 2019 special election ===
Democrat Dan McCready, a veteran and business executive, was unopposed as his party's nominee for this seat, following his narrow initial loss to Mark Harris in the election voided because of alleged ballot fraud by Republican operatives. After the Republicans conducted their primary, they nominated Dan Bishop, a North Carolina state senator, to run in the special election to be held in September 2019. On September 10, 2019, Bishop narrowly won the election with 50.7% of the vote to McCready's 48.7%. He was sworn in on September 17, 2019.

== Past election results ==
=== 2012 ===
2012 North Carolina's 9th congressional district election
Party	Candidate	Votes	%
Republican	Robert Pittenger	194,537	51.8
Democratic	Jennifer Roberts	171,503	45.6
Libertarian	Curtis Campbell	9,650	2.6
Total votes		375,690	100.0
Republican hold			

=== 2014 ===
2014 North Carolina's 9th congressional district election
Party	Candidate	Votes	%
Republican	Robert Pittenger (incumbent)	163,080	93.9
N/A	Write-ins	8,219	4.7
Independent	Shawn Eckles (write-in)	2,369	1.4
Total votes		173,668	100.0
Republican hold			

=== 2016 ===
2016 North Carolina's 9th congressional district election
Party	Candidate	Votes	%
Republican	Robert Pittenger (incumbent)	193,452	58.2
Democratic	Christian Cano	139,041	41.8
Total votes		332,493	100.0
Republican hold			

=== 2018 ===
2018 North Carolina's 9th congressional district election (Note: Election voided by the North Carolina State Board of Elections due to election fraud.)
Party	Candidate	Votes	%
Republican	Mark Harris	139,246	49.25
Democratic	Dan McCready	138,341	48.93
Libertarian	Jeff Scott	5,130	1.81
Total votes		282,717	100.0
Republican hold			

=== 2019 special election ===
2019 North Carolina's 9th congressional district special election
Party	Candidate	Votes	%
Republican	Dan Bishop	96,573	50.69
Democratic	Dan McCready	92,785	48.70
Libertarian	Jeff Scott	773	0.41
Green	Allen Smith	375	0.20
Total votes		190,506	100.00
Republican hold			

=== 2020 ===
2020 North Carolina's 9th congressional district election
Party	Candidate	Votes	%
Republican	Dan Bishop (incumbent)	224,661	55.6
Democratic	Cynthia Wallace	179,463	44.4
Total votes		404,124	100.0
Republican hold			

=== 2022 ===
2022 North Carolina's 9th congressional district election
Party	Candidate	Votes	%
Republican	Richard Hudson (incumbent)	131,453	56.50
Democratic	Ben Clark	101,202	43.50
Total votes		232,655	100.00
Republican hold			

=== 2024 ===
2024 North Carolina's 9th congressional district election
Party	Candidate	Votes	%
Republican	Richard Hudson (incumbent)	210,042	56.3
Democratic	Nigel William Bristow	140,852	37.8
Independent	Shelane Etchison	22,183	5.9
Total votes		373,077	100.0
Republican hold			

=== 2026 ===
North Carolina's 9th congressional district election (2026)
Party	Candidate	Votes	%
Democratic	Richard N. Ojeda II	138,707	51.1
Republican	Richard Hudson (incumbent)	132,692	48.9
Total votes		271,399	100.0
Democratic gain from Republican			

== See also ==
- List of United States congressional districts
- North Carolina's congressional districts
