= 2018 North Carolina's 9th congressional district election =

- November 6, 2018
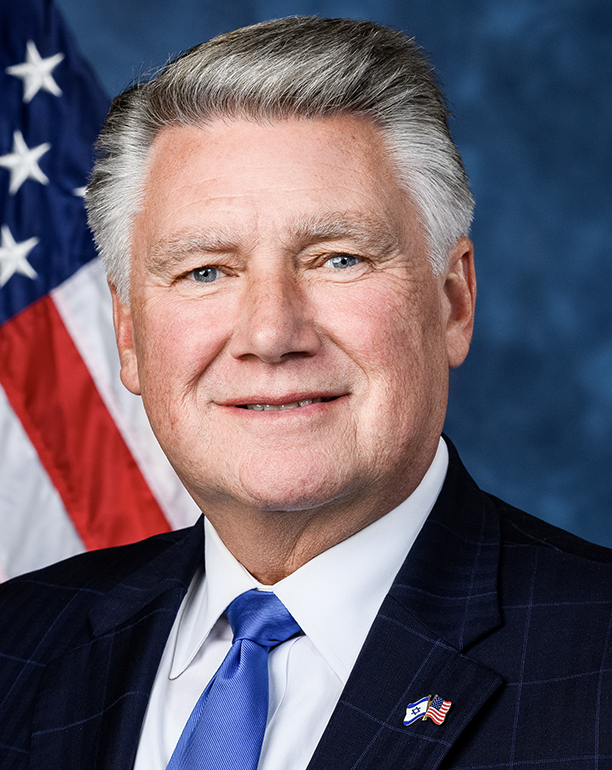

Candidate	Mark Harris	Dan McCready
Party	Republican	Democratic
Popular vote	139,246	138,341
Percentage	49.25%	48.93%
U.S. Representative before election
Robert Pittenger
Republican
Elected U.S. Representative
Election results annulled

The 2018 election in North Carolina's 9th congressional district was held on November 6, 2018, to elect a member for North Carolina's 9th congressional district to the United States House of Representatives.

Republican Mark Harris, an evangelical minister, defeated incumbent Republican Congressman Robert Pittenger in the primary and then faced Democrat Dan McCready, a veteran and businessman, in the general election. Initial tallies put Harris 905 votes ahead, but the state election board refused to certify the results, pending a criminal investigation into allegations of fraud in handling of absentee ballots. The seat was unrepresented at the start of the 116th Congress.

The North Carolina State Board of Elections held an evidentiary hearing in February 2019. On February 21, the board unanimously voted to call a new election because of fraud by Republican operatives. Several Republican campaign operatives have been indicted for their role in an illegal ballot harvesting and ballot tampering operation. In addition to illegal collection and handling of ballots, ballot tampering was admitted in witness testimony, including filling in blank votes to favor Republican candidates. The state legislature passed a law requiring new party primaries.

== Background ==
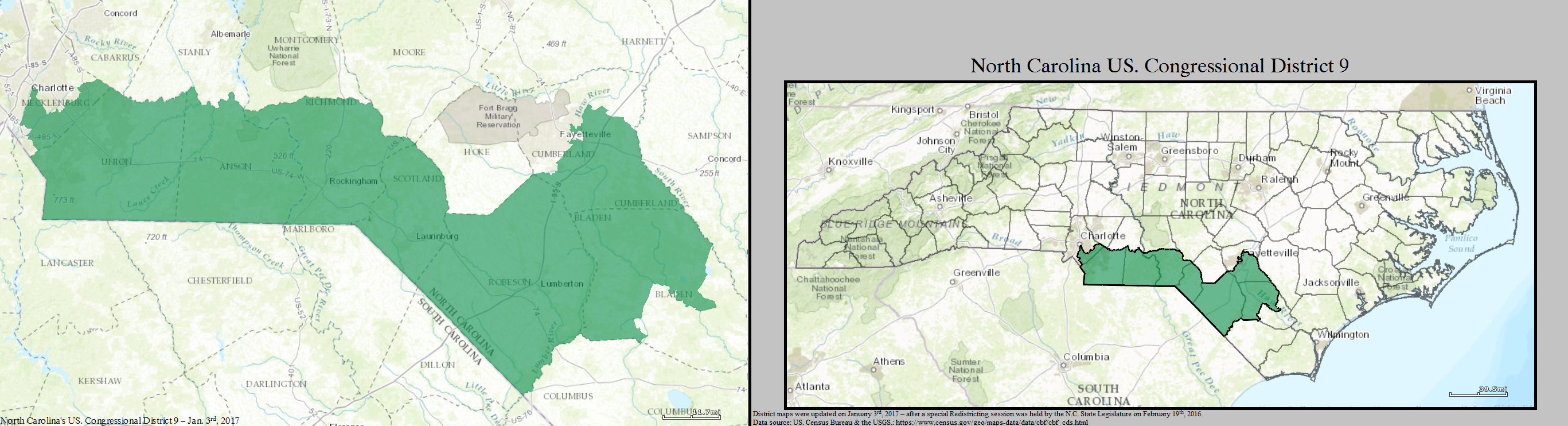
North Carolina's 9th congressional district since January 3, 2017

The ninth district is in south-central North Carolina. It comprises Union, Anson, Richmond, Scotland, and Robeson counties; the southeast portion of Mecklenburg County; and parts of Cumberland and Bladen counties. The district had been held by the Republican Party since 1963.

Robert Pittenger, a Republican, was elected to represent the district in 2012. In the 2016 election, Pittenger was challenged for the Republican nomination by Mark Harris and Todd Johnson. Pittenger won the nomination, defeating Harris by 134 votes. Questions were raised about the role of convicted perjurer and campaign operative Leslie McCrae Dowless, when Johnson won 221 of the 226 Bladen County absentee votes cast in the race. Pittenger was re-elected in 2016 over Democratic Party nominee Christian Cano by over 54,000 votes.

== Democratic primary ==
=== Candidates ===
- Christian Cano, former hotel consultant, Democratic nominee in the 2016 election
- Dan McCready, entrepreneur and U.S. Marine Iraq war veteran, registered as an independent prior to 2016.

The Democratic Congressional Campaign Committee (DCCC) supported McCready during the primary election. He was among the first 11 candidates added to the DCCC's "Red to Blue" program.

=== Results ===
==== Overall ====
Democratic primary results
Party	Candidate	Votes	%
Democratic	Dan McCready	38,098	82.8
Democratic	Christian Cano	7,922	17.2
Total votes		46,020	100.0

==== By county ====
Results by county: McCready—80–90% McCready—70–80%

McCready won every county by varying margins. Blue represents counties won by McCready.

County	Cano		McCready		Total
County	Votes	%	Votes	%	Votes
Anson	416	20.1%	1,656	79.9%	2,072
Bladen	263	14.0%	1,622	86.1%	1,885
Cumberland	873	23.6%	2,830	76.4%	3,703
Mecklenburg	1,384	12.6%	9,627	87.4%	11,011
Richmond	567	20.9%	2,142	79.1%	2,709
Robeson	2,939	16.9%	14,502	83.2%	17,441
Scotland	726	23.6%	2,357	76.5%	3,082
Union	754	18.3%	3,362	81.7%	4,116
Totals	7,922	17.2%	38,098	82.8%	46,020

== Republican primary ==
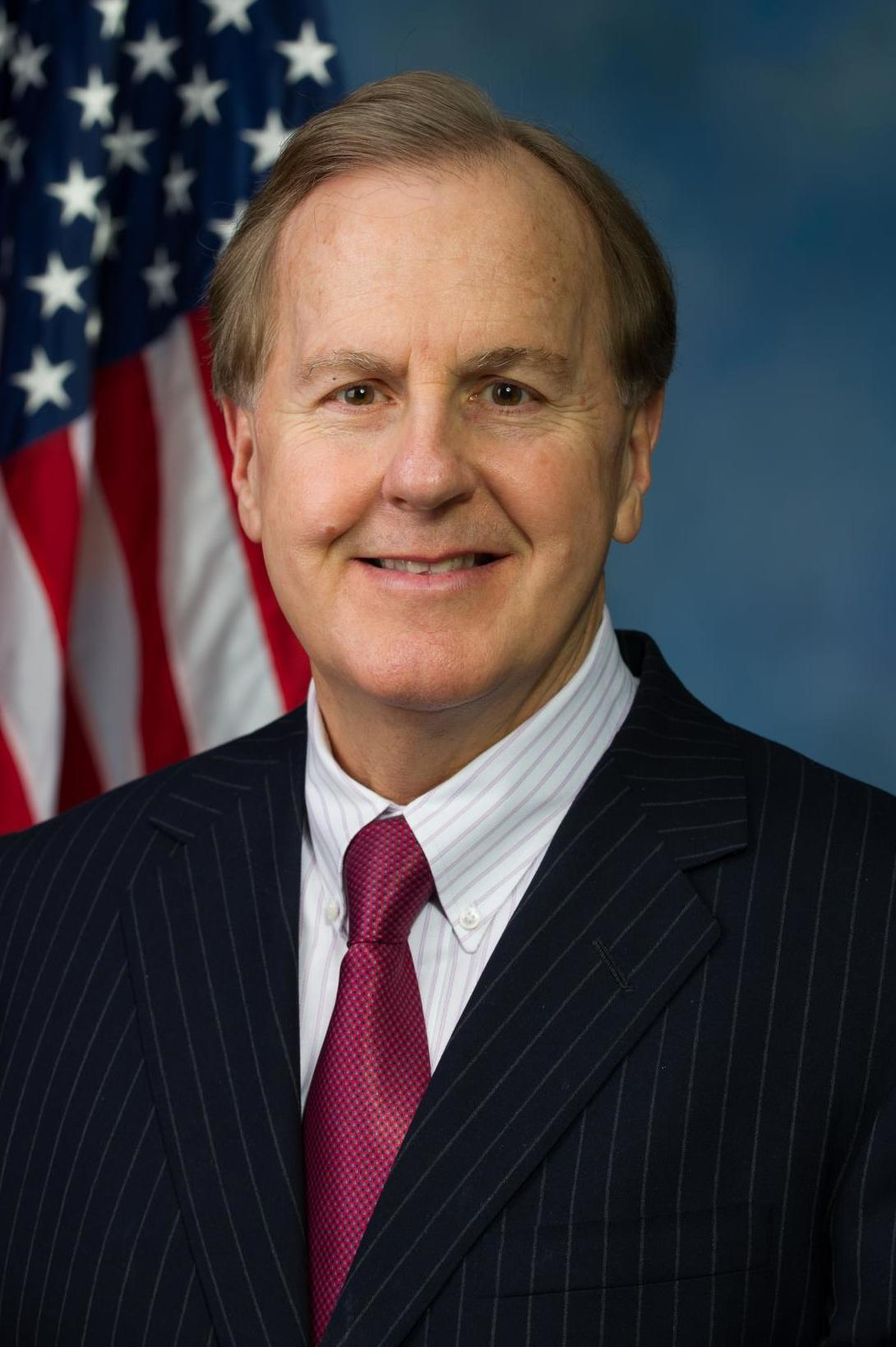
Robert Pittenger's official portrait

=== Candidates ===
- Clarence Goins, banker
- Mark Harris, Baptist evangelical minister and former pastor
- Robert Pittenger, incumbent

Harris resigned from his church in June 2017 in order to devote his full attention to the 2018 campaign. Vice President Mike Pence and Secretary of Housing and Urban Development Ben Carson campaigned for Pittenger during the primary election campaign. Harris criticized Pittenger as a part of the "Washington swamp" for voting in favor of the March 2018 omnibus spending bill. Pittenger defended his conservative voting record and pointed out the increase in military spending in the omnibus bill. He attempted to paint Harris as anti-Trump due to his support of Ted Cruz during the 2016 Republican Party presidential primaries, though Pittenger had endorsed Marco Rubio.

=== Results ===
==== Overall ====
Republican primary results
Party	Candidate	Votes	%
Republican	Mark Harris	17,302	48.5
Republican	Robert Pittenger (incumbent)	16,474	46.2
Republican	Clarence Goins	1,867	5.2
Total votes		35,643	100.0

==== By county ====
Results by county: Harris—60–70% Harris—50–60% Harris—40–50% Pittenger—40–50% Pittenger—50–60% Pittenger—60–70%

Red represents counties won by Harris. Green represents counties won by Pittenger.

County	Goins		Harris		Pittenger		Total
County	Votes	%	Votes	%	Votes	%	Votes
Anson	21	3.4%	339	54.3%	264	42.3%	624
Bladen	60	2.9%	1,427	69.3%	572	27.8%	2,059
Cumberland	633	23.9%	846	32.0%	1,168	44.1%	2,647
Mecklenburg	475	3.8%	5,610	44.9%	6,417	51.3%	12,502
Richmond	38	2.4%	590	36.9%	970	60.7%	1,598
Robeson	271	16.1%	597	35.4%	820	48.6%	1,688
Scotland	43	5.4%	384	48.2%	369	46.4%	796
Union	326	2.4%	7,509	54.7%	5,894	42.9%	13,729
Totals	1,867	5.2%	17,302	48.5%	16,474	46.2%	35,643

== General election ==
Through September 30, McCready reported raising $4.3 million while Harris had raised $1.6 million. President Donald Trump and Second Lady Karen Pence traveled to the district to campaign for Harris, while Representative John Lewis campaigned for McCready. Harris was endorsed by Donald Trump, President of the United States, and Libertarian Jeff Scott was endorsed by Christian Cano, 2016 Democratic primary candidate for North Carolina's 9th congressional district.

Harris and McCready debated on October 10 on WBTV in Charlotte and October 17 at Spirit Square.

- Complete video of debate, October 10, 2018

=== Polling ===
Poll source	Date(s) administered	Sample size	Margin of error	Mark Harris (R)	Dan McCready (D)	Jeff Scott (L)	Undecided
NYT Upshot/Siena College	October 26–30, 2018	505	± 5.0%	45%	44%	3%	7%
NYT Upshot/Siena College	October 1–5, 2018	502	± 4.9%	47%	42%	–	11%
SurveyUSA	October 2–4, 2018	556	± 4.7%	41%	45%	3%	12%
SurveyUSA	July 5–8, 2018	600	± 4.6%	36%	43%	3%	19%
ALG Research (D-McCready)	March 8–13, 2018	500	± 4.4%	43%	44%	–	13%

Hypothetical polling

Poll source	Date(s) administered	Sample size	Margin of error	Robert Pittenger (R)	Dan McCready (D)	Undecided
Public Policy Polling (D-House Majority PAC)	April 16–17, 2018	662	± 3.8%	42%	37%	21%

=== Results ===
2018 North Carolina's 9th congressional district
Party	Candidate	Votes	%
Republican	Mark Harris	139,246	49.25
Democratic	Dan McCready	138,341	48.93
Libertarian	Jeff Scott	5,130	1.81
Total votes		282,717	100.0

When all precincts had reported their unofficial counts on Election Day, the race remained too close to call. The next night, trailing by about 2,000 votes, McCready conceded defeat to Harris. After all the votes were tallied, Harris had a 905-vote lead over McCready, making the election the closest race in the district in over six decades.

=== Refusal of certification ===
The North Carolina State Board of Elections voted 9–0 on November 27 not to certify the election results. On November 30, the board voted 7–2 to hold a public hearing on December 27 regarding the tampering allegations. In early December, the North Carolina Democratic Party filed affidavits with the State Board of Elections claiming that Harris had used independent contractors to collect absentee ballots from voters.

The board opened an investigation around Dowless, a campaign operative with felony fraud and perjury convictions, who was hired by the Harris campaign. Dowless was suspected of electoral fraud in 2014, allegedly mishandling absentee ballots. Dowless had worked for Jim McVicker's campaign for Sheriff. McVicker won that race by a narrow margin and did not respond to inquiries about it in 2018. Dowless worked for McVicker again in the 2018 Republican primary and the general election for Sheriff.

On November 30, the Associated Press retracted its call of the race. The election remained uncertified into December, as state election officials continued to investigate alleged fraud. McCready withdrew his concession on December 6, and NBC News withdrew its call of the race. Dowless was accused of paying workers to illegally collect absentee ballots from voters. Harris directed the hiring of Dowless, even though there had been warnings about and concerns raised in 2016 that Dowless used questionable tactics to deliver votes for Todd Johnson in his 2016 Republican congressional primary against Pittinger and Harris. Earlier, Dowless had worked for a Democrat competing in a 2012 state House primary, and had run as a Democrat himself, in a losing race for school board, in 2014. No questions had been raised in those races.

In Robeson County, the easternmost county in the 9th district, twice as many absentee ballots from African-American voters were not returned compared to white voters. In neighboring Bladen County, the return rates were the same for the two groups. Wake County District Attorney Lorrin Freeman said it was possible over 1,000 ballots had been destroyed.

On December 5, 2018, BuzzFeed News detailed its independent investigative reporting of the alleged vote thefts, a practice that targeted southern rural elderly black voters in the 9th district congressional race. It termed the affair, "...the most serious federal election tampering case in years." Campaign workers, who included Jessica Dowless, whose husband is distantly related to Leslie McCrae Dowless, revealed that the vote tampering went on in a pervasively chaotic atmosphere. McCrae Dowless tracked votes on yellow pads and used cash to pay his employees, including some family members. Some of those workers were said to be under the obvious influence of drugs while on the job. One, said Jessica Dowless, "...was so fucking high the other day she passed out at the fucking computer." Another who picked up absentee ballots was a "pill head." She said McCrae's field workers "...would come to your house, they would get you to fill out an absentee ballot to be sent to your house. They would go back and pick it up and then seal it and then find two witnesses," to certify their validity, bringing them to the office and telling her to witness them, She said she told McCrae she didn't want to do that but "...we had no else," to accomplish the task. Such handling of ballots and completed applications by other than board and postal workers is legally prohibited. McCrae provided a car for one gatherer a week after she began working, lending a van to another. Jessica Dowless tabulated the number of ballots delivered to the county election board and said McCrae gave the Harris campaign updates on the operation's most recent totals. McCrae Dowless was employed by political consultants Red Dome, and received in excess of $428,000 from the Harris campaign. Jessica Dowless said she dropped off completed absentee ballot applications once, and records confirmed she had delivered 185 to the Board. McCrae personally delivered 592 applications before October 31. Buzzfeed contacted McCrae's stepdaughter Lisa Britt, who was later indicted for her alleged role in the case. She admitted to being paid in cash for her work. Although she denied physically gathering votes, her account was disputed by Jessica Dowless who also said that McCrae gathered ballots, a prohibited practice, but only from Democratic voters. Britt denied that Democrats were targeted, claiming they only facilitated voting by those without vehicles, though those ballots could have been returned by postal mail.

In December 2018, the Republican-controlled North Carolina General Assembly passed a bill into law that would require new primary elections if a new election were called, overriding a veto by Democratic governor Roy Cooper. While the investigation continued, McCready prepared to run in a special election.

=== Election board hearings ===
Prior to the election, in October 2018, a state court had ruled that North Carolina's nine-member State Board of Elections was unconstitutional due to changes made by the state legislature in 2017. The court allowed the election board to continue operating during the election and subsequent fraud investigation. On December 28, in an unexpected decision, the court dissolved the election board, before it had certified election results, accusing the board of ignoring court instructions. This left the state without certified election results and without an elections board until January 31, 2019, when a new, five-member board was to be seated under a new law taking effect.

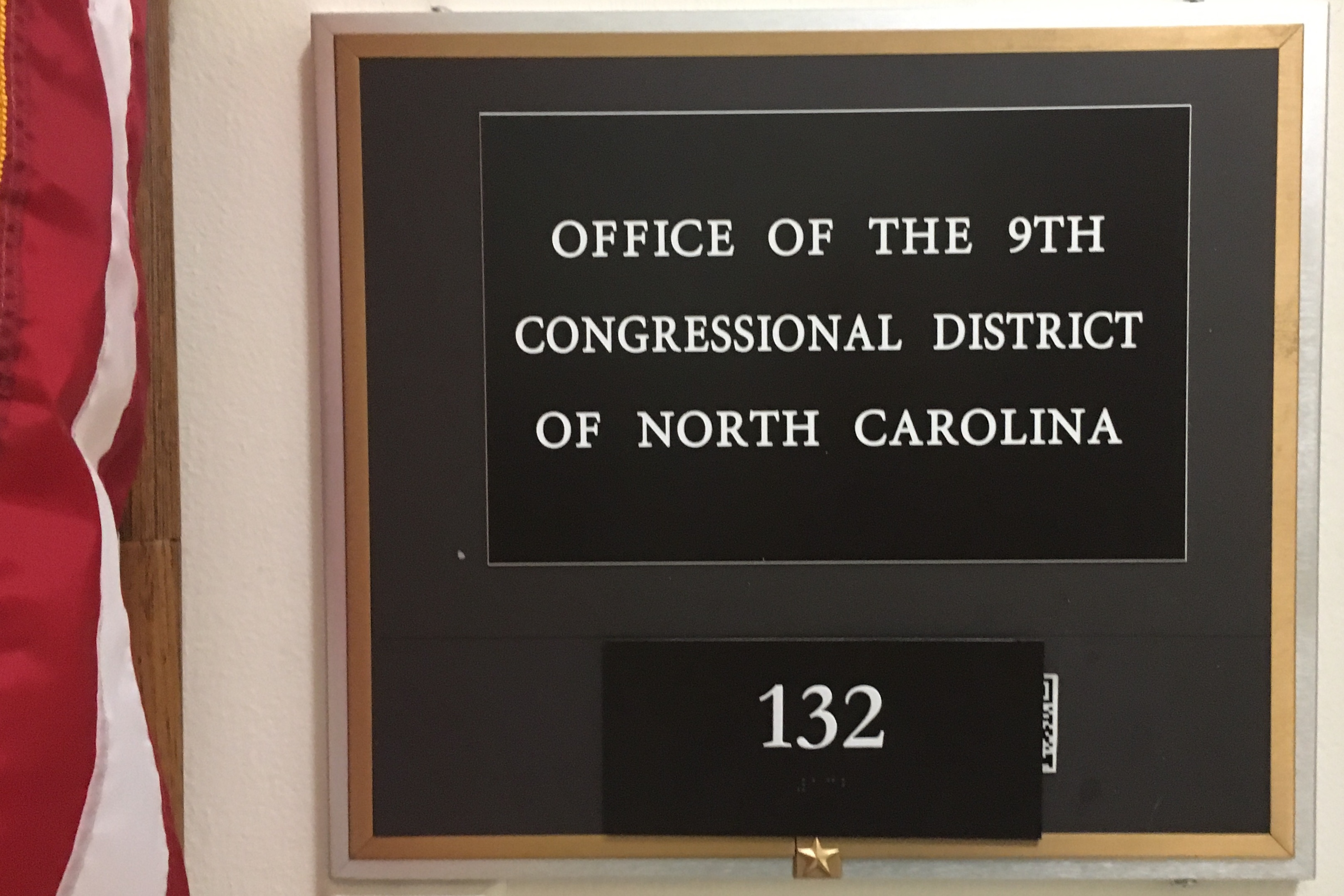
A House of Representatives office remained vacant, awaiting the winner of the disputed election.

The court's dissolution of the election board prompted responses from all quarters. Republican candidate Harris filed an emergency petition requesting that the board certify the results with him as the winner, but only two of nine board members requested an emergency session, and no action was taken before the board dissolved. Democratic candidate McCready publicly called for the fraud investigation to continue. Cooper attempted to name an interim elections board to serve until January 31, but was overridden by the state's Republican-controlled legislature. Meanwhile, incoming United States House of Representatives Majority Leader Steny Hoyer, a Democrat, announced that the House of Representatives will not seat Harris under any circumstances until the fraud investigation is completed.

On January 2, 2019, the staff of the dissolved election board announced that they would continue the investigation, but delayed a January 11 hearing until a new election board is seated on January 31. The same day, Harris announced he would seek court intervention to have him immediately certified as the winner with the goal of being seated in the 116th Congress on January 3. On January 3, the 116th Congress was sworn in with North Carolina's 9th Congressional seat vacant. On the same day, Harris was interviewed by investigators from the North Carolina Board of Elections.

In early January, by refusing to provide the names of Republican candidates for the state elections board, as requested by Cooper, and urging Republicans not to accept seats on the board, North Carolina Republicans blocked the board's intent and ability to hold a scheduled hearing on January 11, 2019, meant for the purposes of investigating the possibility of fraud in the November 9 District election, leaving the District seat in Congress vacant. Republican party officials refused to send Cooper the names of their party's candidates to fill vacancies on the board. Responding to their obstructionism, Cooper said:

All North Carolinians deserve to have confidence in a system of voting that ensures honest and fair elections. If politicians and the people they hire are manipulating the system to steal elections, all of us should pull together to get to the bottom of it and stop it — regardless of whether the candidate who finished ahead in a tainted election is a Republican or a Democrat.

On January 22, 2019, Wake County Superior Court Judge Paul Ridgeway refused Harris's request to order him seated.

On January 31, the new board, composed of three Democratic and two Republican members, voted to schedule a February hearing on the allegations of election irregularities. On February 4, the new board set the hearing for February 18. On February 18, 2019, the regulator reported that it had found evidence of "a coordinated, unlawful and substantially resourced absentee ballot scheme" that may have involved more than 1,000 ballots or ballot request forms. That day, Lisa Britt, the daughter of Dowless's ex-wife, admitted to tampering with ballots on the direction of Dowless – including filling in blank votes to favor Republican candidates and falsifying voter and witness signatures. On February 20, Harris's son, John Harris, a federal prosecutor in North Carolina, testified to the election board that he had repeatedly warned his father not to hire Dowless because Dowless appeared to have previously engaged in illegal tactics to win votes. John Harris also testified that he had expressed similar concerns to his father's chief campaign strategist, Andy Yates. Email records were shown of his discussion of the issue with his father. His father had maintained that he had not been warned of problems with Dowless's reputation and had testified to that effect.

On February 21, Harris admitted that he had made inaccurate statements in his testimony, blaming a recent sepsis infection that had affected his memory and caused him to have two strokes. He said that he had concluded that "public confidence in the 9th District has been undermined to an extent that a new election is warranted." The board unanimously voted to set a new election, with the date to be determined in a later hearing. The board also called for new elections for two local county offices in Bladen County.

== Aftermath ==
Freeman announced that she would call upon a grand jury to investigate the fraud allegations to determine whether or not to file criminal charges. On February 26, Harris, citing ill health, declared that he would not compete in the new congressional election.

Dowless was indicted on felony charges on February 27, consisting of three counts of obstruction of justice, two counts of conspiracy to commit obstruction of justice, and two counts of possession of absentee ballots. Four others were also charged in relation to the absentee ballot collection. In March 2019, the Public Integrity Section of the United States Department of Justice began to issue subpoenas for a federal grand jury investigation related to the case. Documents were requested for a grand jury proceeding to be held April 16–18, 2019. In July 2019, the Wake County district attorney also announced charges against Lisa Britt, Ginger S. Eason, Woody D. Hester, James Singletary, Jessica Dowless and Kelly Hendrix, and additional charges against Leslie McCrae Dowless.

On April 25, 2022, Dowless died of lung cancer, after which all legal charges against him were formally dropped.

For the 2024 elections, Harris announced he would once again run for Congress, in the newly drawn 8th district. He went on to win both the primary on March 5 and the general election on November 5 in what was described by local outlets as a comeback bid.

== See also ==
- List of annulled elections
