= Mark Harris (North Carolina politician) =

American pastor and politician (born 1966)

The Reverend Mark Harris
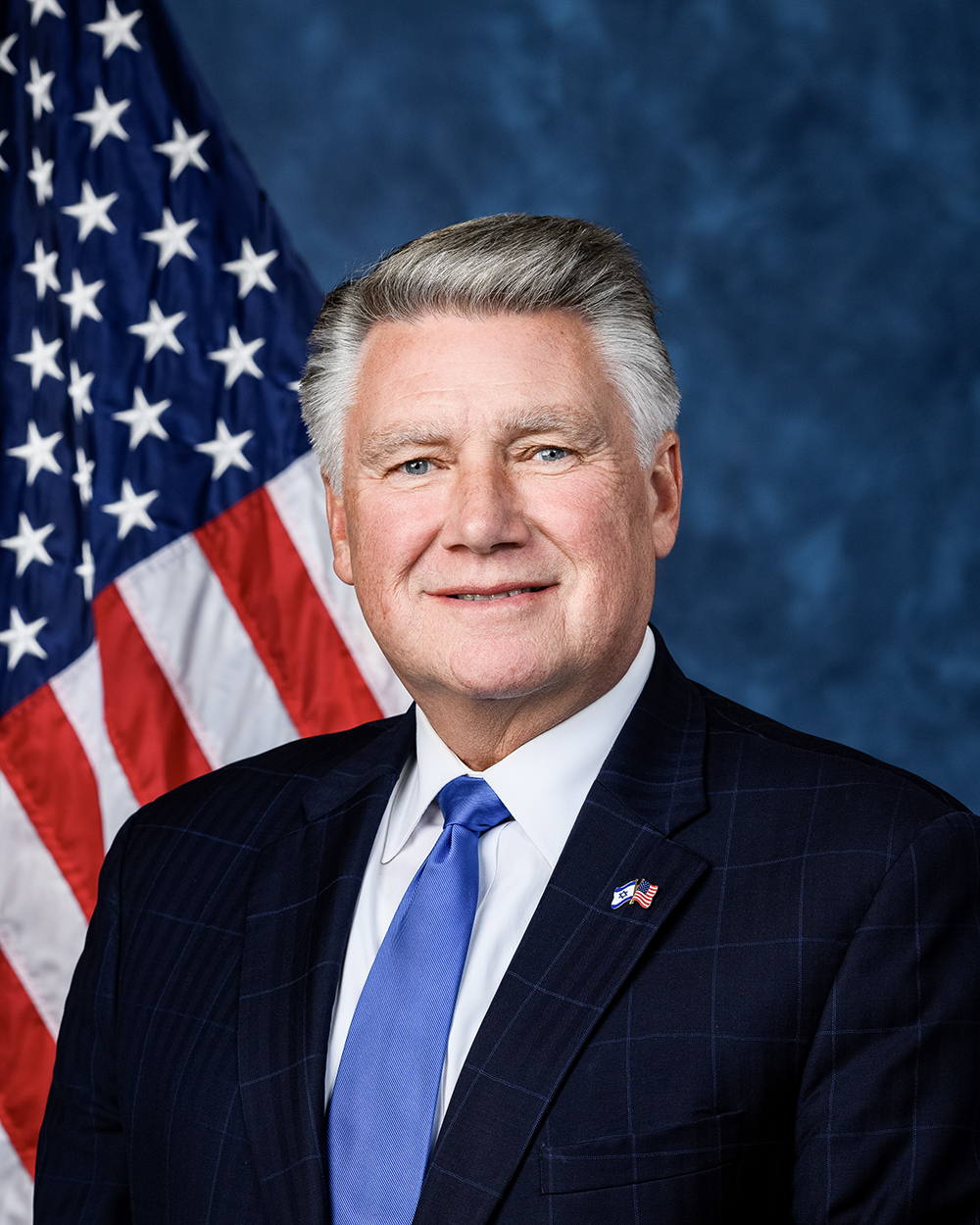
- Official portrait, 2024

Member of the U.S. House of Representatives from North Carolina's 8th district
- Incumbent
- Assumed office January 3, 2025
- Preceded by: Dan Bishop

Personal details
- Born: Mark Everette Harris; April 24, 1966 (age 60) Winston-Salem, North Carolina, U.S.
- Party: Republican
- Spouse: Beth Harris
- Children: 3
- Education: Appalachian State University (BA); Southeastern Baptist Theological Seminary (MDiv, DMin)
- Website: House website Campaign website

Mark Everette Harris (born April 24, 1966) is an American Baptist pastor and politician from North Carolina. A member of the Republican Party, he is the U.S. representative for North Carolina's 8th congressional district since 2025.

Harris first ran for the United States Senate in 2014, placing third in the Republican primary. He then ran to represent North Carolina's 9th congressional district in the United States House of Representatives in the 2016 election, but he was defeated in the Republican primary by incumbent Robert Pittenger.

Harris ran for the 9th district again in 2018, narrowly defeating Pittenger in the Republican primary. In the general election against Democratic opponent Dan McCready, initial tallies appeared to show Harris winning the election, but an election panel declined to certify these results following allegations of ballot fraud involving McCrae Dowless, a Republican political operative employed by the Harris campaign. Dowless was later criminally charged in connection with the alleged fraud, but Harris was not charged. In February 2019, the bipartisan North Carolina Board of Elections dismissed the results of the election and called for a new election to be held. Harris was not a candidate in the new election, which was won by fellow Republican Dan Bishop.

Harris then announced his bid for the 8th district in 2024, following Bishop's decision to retire and instead run for Attorney General. After defeating five opponents to win the Republican nomination, Harris went on to win the general election in a comeback bid.

== Early life and education ==
Harris was born in Winston-Salem, North Carolina, on April 24, 1966. He attended local schools there, graduating from Richard J. Reynolds High School, before earning his bachelor's degree in political science from Appalachian State University. He earned both a Master of Divinity (M.Div.) and Doctor of Ministry (D.Min.) from Southeastern Baptist Theological Seminary.

== Career ==
Harris is the lead pastor at Trinity Baptist Church in Mooresville, North Carolina. He has served as the senior pastor of the First Baptist Church in Charlotte, North Carolina, and as president of the Baptist State Convention of North Carolina. He served as senior of Augusta, Georgia's Curtis Baptist Church from January 1, 2000, to July 2005. He began preaching at Mooresville, North Carolina's Trinity Baptist Church in February 2020.

== Political campaigns ==
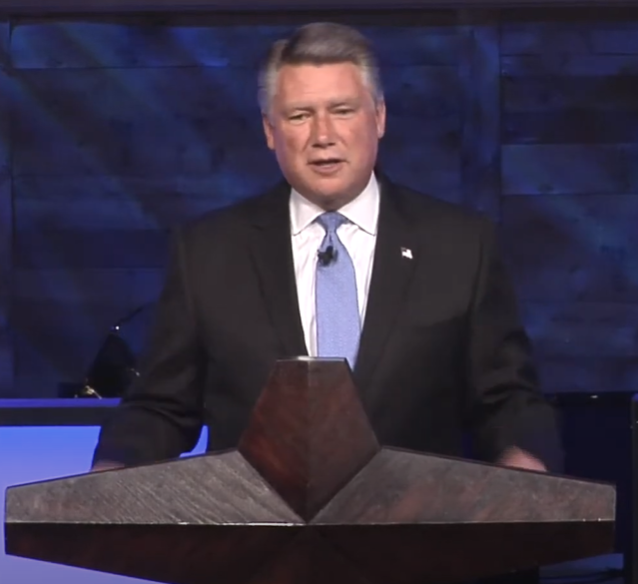
Harris speaking at the First Baptist Church Indian Trail in 2018

=== 2014 U.S. Senate campaign ===
Harris ran for the United States Senate in the 2014 election, finishing in third place in the Republican primary behind Thom Tillis and Greg Brannon.

=== 2016 congressional campaign, 9th district ===
He later ran against incumbent congressman Robert Pittenger for North Carolina's 9th congressional district in the United States House of Representatives in the 2016 election. The election went to a recount, with Pittenger certified the winner by 134 votes.

=== 2018 congressional campaign, 9th district ===
Harris resigned from the First Baptist Church in 2017 and ran again for the U.S. House in 2018. This time, Harris defeated Pittenger in the Republican primary (which featured a higher turnout than the 2016 primary). After the November 6, 2018 general election, Harris was 905 votes ahead of his Democratic competitor, Dan McCready. McCready conceded on the day after the election, but the state Democratic Party filed affidavits alleging that the Harris campaign had engaged in ballot fraud. The North Carolina Board of Elections voted 9–0 on November 27 not to certify the election. The board held hearings from February 18 to February 21, 2019. Harris later acknowledged that some of his testimony had been inaccurate, blaming his health problems as an explanation for his erroneous testimony. On February 21, the Board of Elections unanimously voted to order that a new election be held in the congressional race. On February 26, 2019, citing ill health, Harris declared that he would not compete in the new election. Following an investigation, the Board ordered that a new election be held. Harris was not a candidate in the new election.

=== 2024 congressional campaign, 8th district ===
In September 2023, Harris announced that he would run for the House of Representatives in North Carolina's 8th district, as incumbent Dan Bishop chose to run for attorney general of North Carolina. Harris won the nomination on March 5 against five other opponents, garnering just over 30% of the vote and thus avoiding a runoff against runner-up Allan Baucom. Harris won the November election, defeating Democratic nominee Justin Dues by around 19 points.

== U.S. House of Representatives ==
=== Tenure ===
Rep. Harris was sworn in to the 119th United States Congress on January 3, 2025.

=== Committee assignments ===
- Committee on Agriculture
  - Subcommittee on General Farm Commodities, Risk Management, and Credit
  - Subcommittee on Nutrition and Foreign Agriculture
  - Subcommittee on Livestock, Dairy, and Poultry
- Committee on Education and Workforce
  - Subcommittee on Early Childhood, Elementary, and Secondary Education
  - Subcommittee on Higher Education and Workforce Development
- Committee on the Judiciary
  - Subcommittee on the Administrative State, Regulatory Reform, and Antitrust
  - Subcommittee on the Constitution and Limited Government

=== Caucus memberships ===
- Freedom Caucus

== Political positions ==
=== Education ===
In 2014, Harris called for abolishing the U.S. Department of Education.

=== Environment ===
Harris denies that humans are causing global warming. In 2018, Harris said that “While I do agree that the earth is warming, I do not necessarily buy into the fact that as humans we are creating the issue."

=== Federal budget ===
Harris has stated that he would support a Balanced Budget Amendment and cited concern over what was at the time $19 trillion in debt and $120 trillion in unfunded liabilities.

In 2014, Harris supported reforming Social Security, including reducing the future Social Security payments for those who were currently less than 50 years old.

=== Religion ===
Harris has described Islam as "dangerous" and the work of Satan. In 2014, he claimed that Islam was taking over the world, including the United States. According to Media Matters, Harris signed a statement which declared that "terrorist entities are not aberrations of Islam, they are the very essence of it."

In 2011, Harris said in a sermon at First Baptist Charlotte that there would never be peace between Jews and Muslims unless they convert to Christianity.

During the 2018 campaign, American Bridge 21st Century, a Democratic super PAC that conducts opposition research, brought attention to a 2013 sermon that Harris had given where he questioned whether it was the "healthiest pursuit" for women to prioritize their careers and independence over their biblical "core calling".

Harris is a believer in Young Earth creationism.

=== Abortion ===
Harris opposed the Supreme Court's ruling in Roe v. Wade which prohibited bans on abortion. He has stated that the Affordable Care Act has made healthcare more costly for businesses.

=== LGBTQ rights ===
Harris has called upon wives to be submissive to their husbands and has said he believes homosexuality is a choice. At a rally in 2015, Harris criticized "moral decay" in the United States, saying "We have watched in one generation where homosexuality was once criminalized to now we see the criminalization of Christianity." Harris led supporters of North Carolina Amendment 1, which banned same-sex marriage in North Carolina in 2012. The amendment was found to be unconstitutional by a federal court in 2014, and prohibitions on same-sex marriage were found to be unconstitutional by the Supreme Court's Obergefell v. Hodges decision in 2015. After the Supreme Court ruling, Harris said, "one of the most devastating blows to the American way of life has been the breakdown of the family unit. A marriage consists of one man and one woman. The Supreme Court, in a 5–4 decision, decided otherwise."

Harris campaigned for the Public Facilities Privacy & Security Act (commonly known as the "bathroom bill") in North Carolina in 2016, which stated that in government buildings, individuals (such as students at state-operated schools) may only use restrooms and changing facilities that correspond to the sex identified on their birth certificate. The bill sparked a widespread backlash and boycott, including by major U.S. firms. Amid the backlash, Harris adamantly argued against repealing the bill. The bill was eventually repealed and replaced with House Bill 142 on March 30, 2017.

Prior to his election to congress, Harris organized a church grassroots operation on behalf of the social conservative evangelical Family Research Council. Harris has promoted Family Research Council material that endorsed conversion therapy for gays and lesbians.

== Electoral history ==
2014 United States Senate election (primary)
Party	Candidate	Votes	%
Republican	Thom Tillis	223,174	45.68%
Republican	Greg Brannon	132,630	27.15%
Republican	Mark Harris	85,727	17.55%
Republican	Heather Grant	22,971	4.70%
Republican	Jim Snyder	9,414	1.93%
Republican	Ted Alexander	9,258	1.89%
Republican	Alex Lee Bradshaw	3,528	0.72%
Republican	Edward Kryn	1,853	0.38%
Total votes		488,555	100.00%

2016 United States House of Representatives election, District 9 (primary)
Party	Candidate	Votes	%
Republican	Robert Pittenger (incumbent)	9,299	35.0
Republican	Mark Harris	9,165	34.4
Republican	Todd Johnson	8,142	30.6
Total votes		26,606	100.0

2018 United States House of Representatives election, District 9 (primary)
Party	Candidate	Votes	%
Republican	Mark Harris	17,302	48.5
Republican	Robert Pittenger (incumbent)	16,474	46.2
Republican	Clarence Goins	1,867	5.2
Total votes		35,643	100.0

2018 United States House of Representatives election, District 9 (general)
Party	Candidate	Votes	%
Republican	Mark Harris	139,246	49.25
Democratic	Dan McCready	138,341	48.93
Libertarian	Jeff Scott	5,130	1.81
Total votes		282,717	100.0

2024 United States House of Representatives election, District 8 (primary)
Party	Candidate	Votes	%
Republican	Mark Harris	24,764	30.4
Republican	Allan Baucom	21,964	27.0
Republican	John Bradford	14,458	17.8
Republican	Don Brown	8,519	10.5
Republican	Leigh Brown	7,845	9.6
Republican	Chris Maples	3,787	4.6
Total votes		81,337	100.0

2024 United States House of Representatives election, District 8 (general)
Party	Candidate	Votes	%
Republican	Mark Harris	238,625	59.6%
Democratic	Justin Dues	161,704	40.4%
Total votes		400,329	100.0%

== Personal life ==
Harris and his wife Beth have three children and ten grandchildren.

In January 2019, Harris was reported to have set off a fire alarm when leaving a building, allegedly to avoid news media. Harris explained his actions by stating that he was rushing to catch a sports game.

U.S. House of Representatives
Preceded by Dan Bishop	Member of the U.S. House of Representatives from North Carolina's 8th congressional district 2025–present	Incumbent
U.S. order of precedence (ceremonial)
Preceded by Pat Harrigan	United States representatives by seniority 389th	Succeeded by Jeff Hurd
