= Dan Bishop =

American politician and attorney (born 1964)

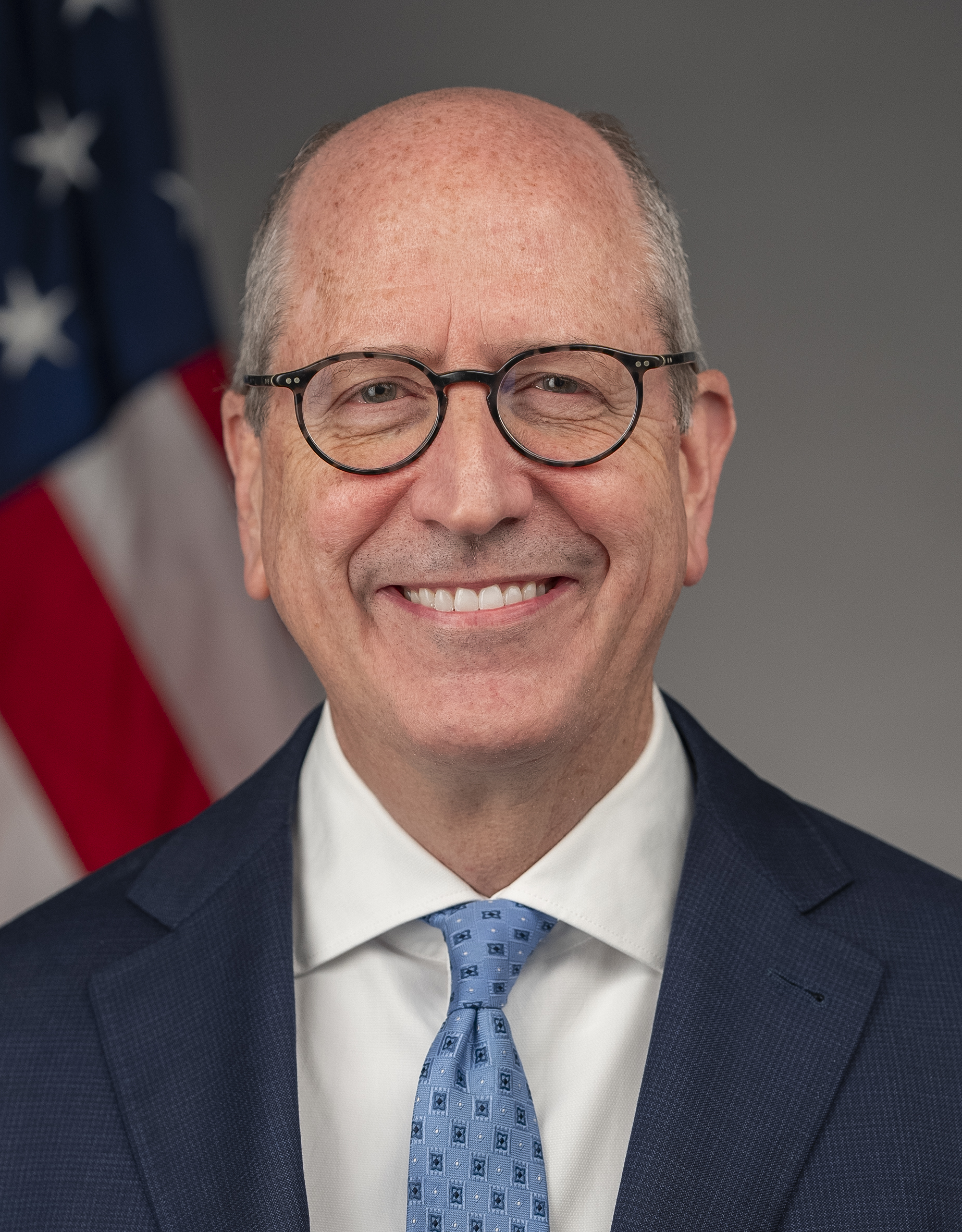
- Official portrait, 2025

United States Attorney for the Middle District of North Carolina
- Incumbent
- Assumed office November 12, 2025; Interim: November 12, 2025 – May 18, 2026
- President: Donald Trump
- Preceded by: Cliff Barrett (acting)

Deputy Director of the Office of Management and Budget
- In office April 3, 2025 – November 12, 2025
- President: Donald Trump
- Preceded by: Nani A. Coloretti
- Succeeded by: Hal Duncan

Member of the U.S. House of Representatives from North Carolina
- In office September 10, 2019 – January 3, 2025 (Note: Bishop's official service begins on the date of the special election, while he was not sworn in until September 17, 2019.)
- Preceded by: Robert Pittenger
- Succeeded by: Mark Harris
- Constituency: 9th district (2019–2023); 8th district (2023–2025)

Member of the North Carolina Senate from the 39th district
- In office January 1, 2017 – September 17, 2019
- Preceded by: Bob Rucho
- Succeeded by: Rob Bryan

Member of the North Carolina House of Representatives from the 104th district
- In office January 1, 2015 – January 1, 2017
- Preceded by: Ruth Samuelson
- Succeeded by: Andy Dulin

Member of the Mecklenburg County Commission from the 5th district
- In office January 2005 – December 2008
- Preceded by: Ruth Samuelson
- Succeeded by: Neil Cooksey

Personal details
- Born: James Daniel Bishop; July 1, 1964 (age 62) Charlotte, North Carolina, U.S.
- Party: Republican
- Spouse: Jo Bishop
- Children: 1
- Education: University of North Carolina, Chapel Hill (BS, JD)
- Website: House website Campaign website

James Daniel Bishop (born July 1, 1964) is an American attorney and politician serving as the United States attorney for the Middle District of North Carolina. A member of the Republican Party, he previously served as the Deputy Director of the Office of Management and Budget in 2025, as a U.S. representative from North Carolina from 2019 to 2025, as a North Carolina state senator from 2017 to 2019, as a member of the North Carolina House of Representatives from 2015 to 2017, and as a member of the Mecklenburg County Commission from 2005 to 2009.

Bishop was the lead author of North Carolina's Public Facilities Privacy & Security Act, commonly called the bathroom bill, which prohibited transgender people from using public restrooms other than those of the sex listed on their birth certificates. As a result of backlash, North Carolina lost a significant amount of revenue from companies and other organizations who chose to withdraw their investments in the state.

On September 10, 2019, Bishop won the special election to the U.S. House of Representatives with 50.7% of the vote to Dan McCready's 48.7%. Bishop ran for re-election in 2022 in North Carolina's 8th congressional district, following the 2020 census and subsequent litigation contesting the maps drawn by the General Assembly. In the 2022 U.S. congressional election, Bishop won reelection to his seat with 69.9% of the vote. In 2024, Bishop retired from Congress to run unsuccessfully for attorney general, losing to Democrat Jeff Jackson.

On December 10, 2024, President-elect Donald Trump announced his intention to nominate Bishop as the deputy director of the Office of Management and Budget. He was confirmed by the Senate on March 26, 2025. He served in that position for nearly eight months until President Donald Trump appointed Bishop to become the interim United States attorney for the Middle District of North Carolina.

== Early life and education ==
Bishop received a B.S. in business administration from the University of North Carolina at Chapel Hill in 1986 and a J.D. from the University of North Carolina School of Law in 1990.

== County Commission and North Carolina House of Representatives (2005–2016) ==
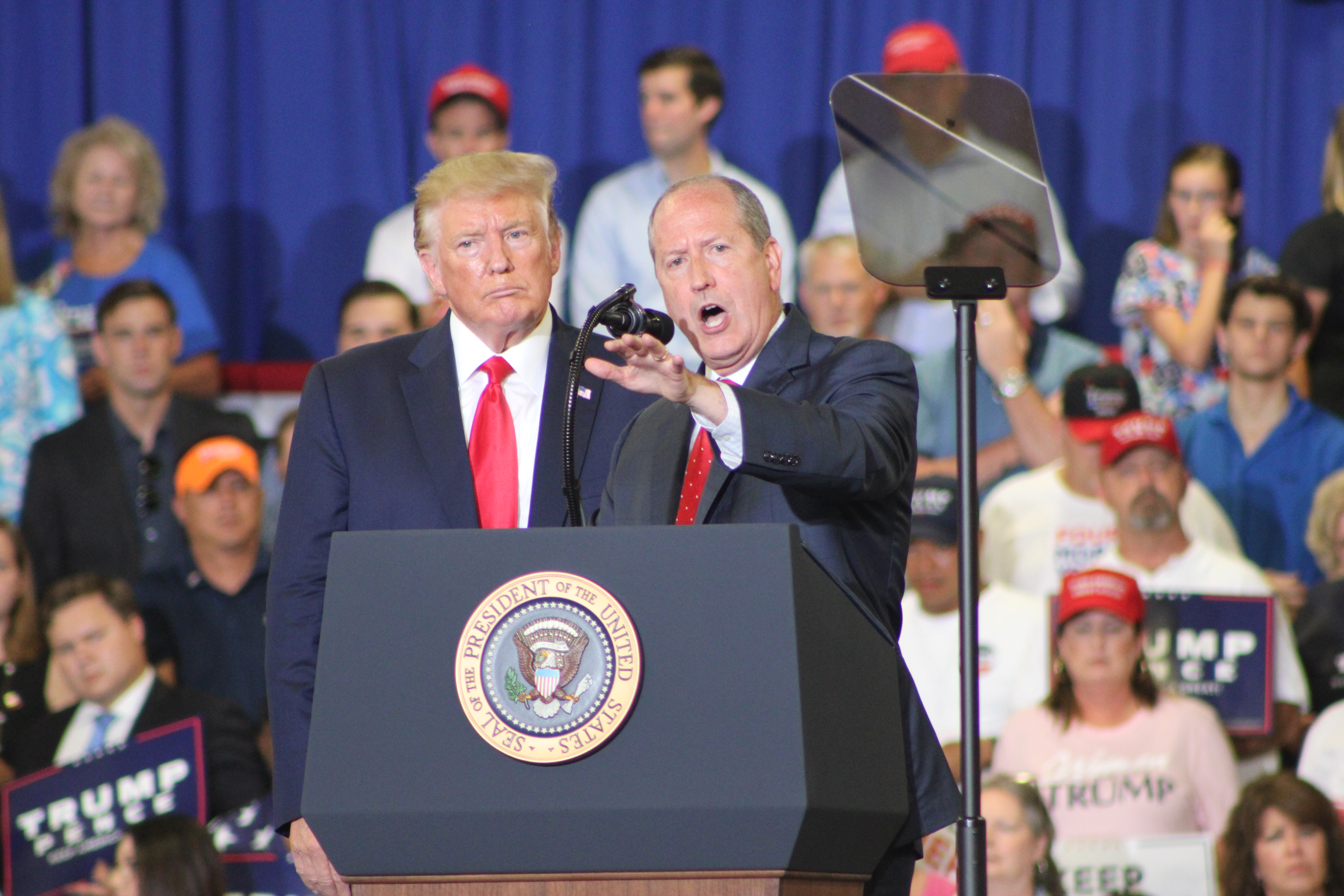
Bishop with President Donald Trump in September 2019

Bishop was a member of the Mecklenburg County Commission from 2004 to 2008. After a six-year absence from politics, he was elected to the North Carolina House of Representatives from a south Charlotte seat for a single term (2015–17), running against a Libertarian opponent, Eric Cable, but without a Democratic one. Bishop's district was House District 104. He succeeded Ruth Samuelson, who retired from the House.

== North Carolina State Senate ==
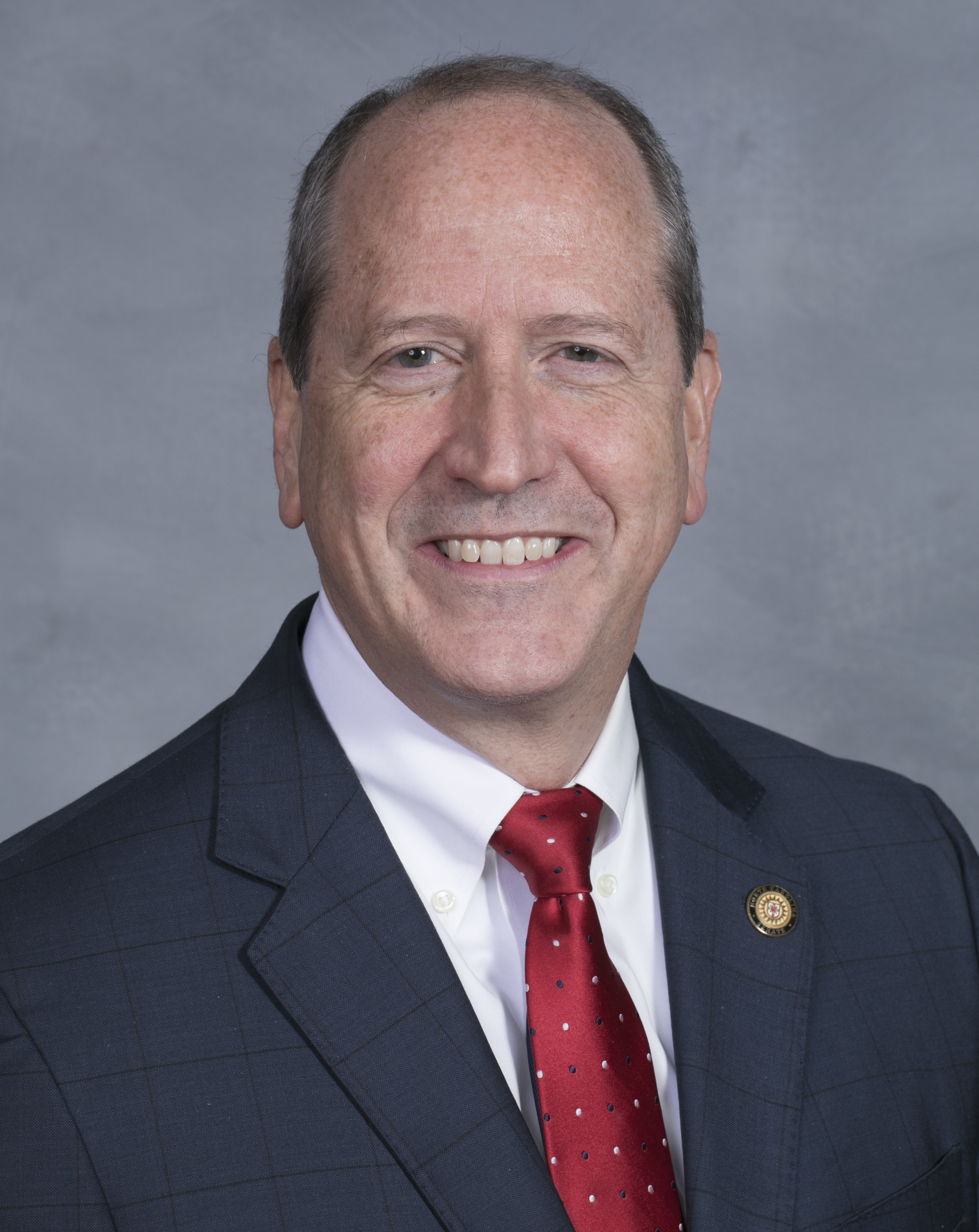
Bishop's official State Senate portrait, 2019

Bishop won his North Carolina State Senate District 39 seat in November 2016 to succeed Bob Rucho, who was not seeking reelection. He received 58,739 votes (52.81%), defeating Democrat Lloyd Scher, who received 44,655 (47.19%).

During the 2017–18 legislative session, Bishop co-chaired the Select Committee on Judicial Reform and Redistricting, was vice-chair of the Select Committee on Elections, and a member of several other committees.

Bishop has attracted attention for statements attacking journalists, which have been likened to statements by Donald Trump. On one occasion, he criticized the Raleigh press corps over coverage of the state budget, calling them the "jihad media."

=== Bathroom bill and backlash ===
Bishop was the architect of the Public Facilities Privacy & Security Act, or House Bill 2. This controversial "bathroom bill" restricted transgender people from using gender-segregated public facilities other than those identified for use by their sex as listed on their birth certificates. The bill, signed into law by Governor Pat McCrory, also invalidated a local nondiscrimination law passed by the Charlotte City Council and prohibited any local government in North Carolina from enacting new protections for gay, lesbian, or transgender people. Bishop used his sponsorship of HB 2 in fundraising emails, stating that he stood up to the "radical transgender agenda". His role in promoting HB 2 raised his profile.

In 2017, after a public backlash against the legislation and economic harms of $3.7 billion, HB 2 was repealed and replaced with new compromise legislation brokered between Governor Roy Cooper and the leadership of the state legislature. Bishop was the sole senator to make a floor speech against HB 2's revocation, calling it a "betrayal of principle". In emails from Bishop subsequently made public under North Carolina's public-records law, Bishop compared LGBT rights activists to the Taliban.

After the release of a video showing a group of people following McCrory, shouting "shame" and calling him a bigot, Bishop said he would introduce legislation "to make it a crime to threaten, intimidate, or retaliate against a present or former North Carolina official in the course of, or on account of, the performance of his or her duties."

== U.S. House of Representatives ==
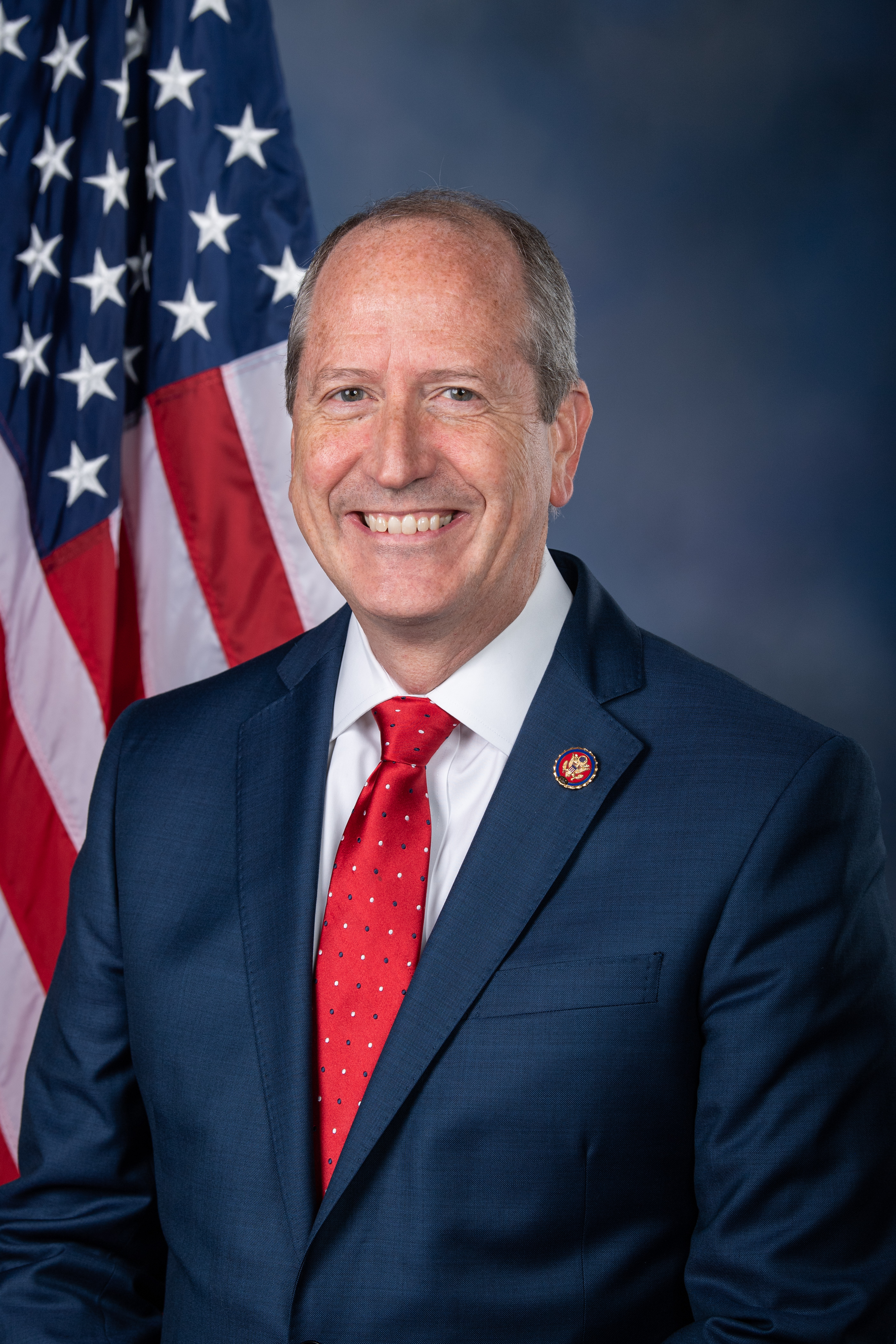
Official congressional portrait, 2019

=== Elections ===
==== 2019 special election ====
On March 14, 2019, Bishop entered the 9th congressional district special election. He won the May 14 Republican primary with 47% of the vote. The election had been called after the results of the regular election were thrown out due to irregularities with absentee ballots in the district's eastern portion. The Republican nominee in that contest, Mark Harris, had defeated Democrat Dan McCready by 905 votes, the closest race in the district in decades. Much of the district's share of Mecklenburg County had not been represented by a Democrat since 1953, and the 9th has been in Republican hands without interruption since it was configured as a Charlotte-based district in 1963.

In the September 10 general election, Bishop defeated McCready, 50.7% to 48.7%. He won mainly by dominating the more rural areas of the district, as well as Union County, the district's largest whole county. The closeness of the race was remarkable given the 9th's heavy Republican bent on paper; it had a Cook Partisan Voting Index of R+8.

=== Tenure ===
Bishop took office on September 17, 2019.

Bishop, along with all other Senate and House Republicans, voted against the American Rescue Plan Act of 2021.

==== 2020 presidential election ====
On January 6, 2021, Bishop was one of 147 Republican lawmakers who objected to the certification of electoral votes from the 2020 presidential election after a mob of Trump supporters stormed the U.S. Capitol and forced an emergency recess of Congress. Later that month, he voted against a failed attempt to impeach Trump for his alleged role in inciting the mob to storm the Capitol.

==== Iraq ====
In June 2021, Bishop was one of 49 House Republicans to vote to repeal the AUMF against Iraq.

==== Israel ====
Bishop voted to provide Israel with support following 2023 Hamas attack on Israel.

==== Defense ====
In July 2022, Bishop was the only House Republican to vote for an amendment that would have cut the proposed defense budget by $100 billion. On the same day, Bishop was one of 14 Republicans to vote for a separate amendment that would have removed a proposed $37 billion spending increase in the defense budget.

=== Committee assignments ===
- Committee on Homeland Security
  - Subcommittee on Counterterrorism, Law Enforcement, and Intelligence
  - Subcommittee on Oversight, Investigations, and Accountability (Chairman)
- Committee on the Judiciary
  - Subcommittee on the Administrative State, Regulatory Reform, and Antitrust
  - Subcommittee on the Constitution and Limited Government
- Select Subcommittee on the Weaponization of the Federal Government

=== Caucus memberships ===
- Freedom Caucus
- Republican Study Committee
- Border Security Caucus
- Congressional FFA Caucus
- Congressional Prayer Caucus
- Election Integrity Caucus
- Values Action Team

== Financial contributions to the social network Gab ==
In August 2017, Bishop contributed $500 toward the establishment of the social network Gab, a website criticized for its white supremacist and far-right content. He said he made the contribution in response to what he called a California "tech giants' Big Brother routine", referring to companies such as PayPal and Facebook canceling accounts used by organizers and funders of the Unite the Right rally, in Charlottesville, Virginia. Bishop's crowdfunding contribution attracted attention the next year, after the Pittsburgh synagogue shooting. He responded that he was being "smeared", saying, "I don't use Gab, but if its management allows its users to promote violence, anti-Semitism, and racism on the platform they have misled investors and they will be gone quickly, and rightfully so." The contribution came up again a week after the 2019 El Paso shooting and a month before Bishop's House election. A group called Stand Up Republic aired criticism of his contribution to Gab as part of a $500,000 advertising campaign. Bishop criticized the advertising, calling it "defamatory".

== 2024 attorney general election ==
Bishop was the Republican candidate for the office of attorney general in North Carolina in 2024. Despite Republican presidential nominee Donald Trump's statewide victory in North Carolina, Bishop was defeated by Democratic candidate, and fellow congressman Jeff Jackson 51% to 49%.

== Trump administration ==
On December 10, 2024, President-elect Donald Trump announced his intention to nominate Bishop as the deputy director of the Office of Management and Budget. He was confirmed by the Senate on March 26, 2025. He served in that position for nearly eight months until President Donald Trump appointed Bishop to become the interim United States Attorney for the Middle District of North Carolina; He was confirmed for the position by the United States Senate in May. In April 2026, Bishop was named prosecutor of election fraud in the U.S. Department of Justice.

== Personal life ==
Bishop is Methodist.

== Electoral history ==
Mecklenburg County, North Carolina 5th District County Commissioner General Election, 2004
Party	Candidate	Votes	%
Republican	Dan Bishop	42,452	100.0
Total votes		42,452	100.0

Mecklenburg County, North Carolina 5th District County Commissioner General Election, 2006
Party	Candidate	Votes	%
Republican	Dan Bishop (incumbent)	23,925	100.0
Total votes		23,925	100.0

North Carolina 104th State House District General Election, 2014
Party	Candidate	Votes	%
Republican	Dan Bishop	18,576	74.78
Libertarian	Eric Cable	6,266	25.22
Total votes		24,842	100.0

North Carolina 39th State Senate District General Election, 2016
Party	Candidate	Votes	%
Republican	Dan Bishop	58,739	56.81
Democratic	Lloyd Scher	44,655	43.19
Total votes		103,394	100.0

North Carolina 39th State Senate District Republican Primary, 2018
Party	Candidate	Votes	%
Republican	Dan Bishop (incumbent)	8,778	71.28
Republican	Beth Monaghan	3,537	28.72
Total votes		12,315	100.0

North Carolina 39th State Senate District General Election, 2018
Party	Candidate	Votes	%
Republican	Dan Bishop (incumbent)	49,698	52.89
Democratic	Chad Stachowicz	44,273	47.11
Total votes		93,971	100.0

North Carolina 9th Congressional District Special Republican Primary, 2019
Party	Candidate	Votes	%
Republican	Dan Bishop	14,405	47.68
Republican	Stony Rushing	5,882	19.47
Republican	Matthew Ridenhour	5,166	17.10
Republican	Leigh Brown	2,672	8.84
Republican	Stevie Rivenbark Hull	906	3.00
Republican	Fern Shubert	438	1.45
Republican	Chris Anglin	382	1.26
Republican	Kathie Day	193	0.64
Republican	Gary Dunn	105	0.35
Republican	Albert Lee Wiley Jr.	62	0.21
Total votes		30,211	100.0

North Carolina 9th Congressional District Special Election, 2019
Party	Candidate	Votes	%	±%
Republican	Dan Bishop	96,573	50.69	+1.44
Democratic	Dan McCready	92,785	48.70	−0.23
Libertarian	Jeff Scott	773	0.41	−1.40
Green	Allen Smith	375	0.20	N/A
Total votes		190,506	100.0	N/A

North Carolina 9th Congressional District General Election, 2020
Party	Candidate	Votes	%	±%
Republican	Dan Bishop	224,661	55.59	+4.9
Democratic	Cynthia Wallace	179,463	44.41	−4.29
Total votes		404,124	100.0	+12.13

North Carolina 8th Congressional District General Election, 2022
Party	Candidate	Votes	%
Republican	Dan Bishop	183,998	69.91
Democratic	Scott Huffman	79,192	30.09
Total votes		263,190	100.00

2024 North Carolina Attorney General election
Party	Candidate	Votes	%
Democratic	Jeff Jackson	2,874,960	51.43
Republican	Dan Bishop	2,715,411	48.57
Total votes		5,590,371	100.00

U.S. House of Representatives
Preceded by Robert Pittenger	Member of the U.S. House of Representatives from North Carolina's 9th congressional district 2019–2023	Succeeded by Richard Hudson
Preceded by Richard Hudson	Member of the U.S. House of Representatives from North Carolina's 8th congressional district 2023–2025	Succeeded by Mark Harris
Party political offices
Preceded by Jim O'Neill	Republican nominee for Attorney General of North Carolina; 2024	Most recent
Political offices
Preceded by Nani A. Coloretti	Deputy Director of the Office of Management and Budget; 2025	Vacant
U.S. order of precedence (ceremonial)
Preceded by Larry Kissell as Former U.S. Representative	Order of precedence of the United States as Former U.S. Representative	Succeeded by Kathy Manning as Former U.S. Representative
