= North Carolina State Board of Elections =

Government agency responsible for elections in North Carolina

State Board of Elections
- Logo of the North Carolina State Board of Elections

Agency overview
- Jurisdiction: North Carolina
- Headquarters: Raleigh
- Agency executive: Sam Hayes, Executive Director
- Website: www.ncsbe.gov

The North Carolina State Board of Elections (NCSBE) is an agency of the North Carolina state government charged with the administration of the elections process, as well as campaign finance, and lobbying disclosure and compliance. The State Board of Elections works in conjunction with the state's 100 county boards of elections.

Session Law 2018-146 re-established the pre-2017 board, effective January 31, 2019. The agency will thus be overseen by a five-member board – three from the governor's party and two from the other party. From March 2018 until December 2018, a contested nine-member Bipartisan State Board of Elections and Ethics Enforcement existed. The agency had a vacant board from June 2017 until March 2018.

== History ==
=== Bipartisan State Board of Elections and Ethics Enforcement (2017–18) ===
The Bipartisan State Board of Elections and Ethics Enforcement was created as an agency overseen by an eight-member board, merging the five-member State Board of Elections, the State Ethics Commission and the Lobbying Compliance Division of the Secretary of State’s Office. A first law to this effect was signed by outgoing Governor McCrory (R) on December 16, 2016 in a special session shortly after Roy Cooper (D) defeated McCrory in the November 2016 gubernatorial election. With the law, the Republican-majority General Assembly limited the power of the newly elected Democratic Governor in the appointment of the board's members. Newly sworn in Governor Cooper filed suit, and the law was struck down on March 17, 2017 by a three-judge panel of Wake County Superior Court. In April 2017, a new version of the law, Senate Bill 68, was passed by the General Assembly by overriding Governor Cooper's veto, enacting Session Law 2017-6.

Governor Cooper sued again and on June 1, 2017, the same panel as in the previous case dismissed the lawsuit for lack of jurisdiction. Cooper appealed, while the new State Board remained vacant. On January 26, 2018, the North Carolina Supreme Court held in Cooper v. Berger that the provisions of this law regarding membership and appointment of the board violated the separation of powers clause under the Constitution of North Carolina. The General Assembly subsequently passed House Bill 90, creating a ninth position on the state board and giving the governor more control over the appointments. While Governor Cooper let the bill become law without his signature, he again filed suit. Governor Cooper appointed the board's members in March 2018, after it being vacant since June 2017. The General Assembly also referred a constitutional amendment to the November 2018 ballot, which would have codified this board into the constitution. It was opposed by the current and former governors and was ultimately defeated, 62% to 38%, by voters.

Additionally, in October 2018, just weeks before the November elections, the same three-judge panel of the earlier lawsuits ruled the nine-member board unconstitutional as well. Because of the timing, the court allowed the board to continue operating until after the elections.

However, the nine-member board did not certify the 9th Congressional District election on November 27, ordering an investigation into election fraud. Therefore the judges issued a stay of their order, allowing time for the investigation to be conducted and for the General Assembly to enact a law for a new board. The General Assembly thus passed a bill in December 2018 (over the Governor's veto) re-establishing the former State Board of Elections and State Ethics Commission as separate bodies, effective January 31, 2019. However, the existing nine-member board set a hearing for January 11, 2019, well beyond the December 28 deadline ordered by the court. The court refused to extend the deadline further, dissolving the board while the congressional election remained unresolved.

In 2024 the Assembly assigned the responsibility of appointing the members of the board to the North Carolina State Auditor, effective May 2025. The legislation also gave the auditor the power to appoint county boards of elections chairs. The law is currently undergoing litigation.

== Structure ==
The North Carolina State Board of Elections consists of five members appointed by the State Auditor with three members affiliated with the governor's political party and the remaining two affiliated with the other largest political party in the state. Potential members are nominated by state party chairs and from the list of nominees the State Auditor makes their selection. The board hires its own executive director and appoints the chairs of each of the county boards of elections.

== See also ==
- 2024 North Carolina elections
- Elections in North Carolina

== Works cited ==
- Cooper, Christopher A. (2024). Anatomy of a Purple State : A North Carolina Politics Primer. Chapel Hill: The University of North Carolina Press. ISBN 9781469681719.
