= Martin L. Hampton =

American architect

Martin Luther Hampton (August 3, 1890 in Laurens, South Carolina – 1950 in Dade County) was an architect in Florida. After studying at the Columbia University in New York he settled in 1914 in Miami. Many of his buildings are listed on the National Register of Historic Places.

Works (attribution) include:

- Arlington Square, (1925) 1330 Pennsylvania Avenue, Miami Beach. FL—Mediterranean Revival, renamed Sunbrite Apartments after complete renovation in 2010
- Carl G. Adams House, 31 Hunting Lodge Ct., Miami Springs, FL (Hampton, Martin L.), NRHP-listed
- Bay Isle Commercial Building, 238 E. Davis Blvd., Tampa, FL (Hampton, Martin L.), NRHP-listed
- Caldwell County Courthouse, Main St., Lenoir, NC (Hampton, Martin L.), NRHP-listed
- Casa Faena (1928), Miami Beach, Florida, a hotel built in 1928 originally as an apartment building, El Paraiso Apartments.
- Château Petit Douy, 1500 Brickell Avenue, Miami, FL
- City National Bank Building, 121 S.E. 1st St., Miami, FL (Hampton & Ehmann), NRHP-listed
- The Colony Hotel (1926), 525 East Atlantic Avenue, Delray Beach, FL
- Congress Building, 111 Northeast 2nd Ave., Miami, FL (Hampton, Martin L.), NRHP-listed
- Glenn Curtiss House, 500 Deer Run, Miami Springs, FL (Hampton, Martin L.), NRHP-listed
- Lua Curtiss House I, 85 Deer Run, Miami Springs, FL (Hampton, Martin L.), NRHP-listed
- Lua Curtiss House II, 150 Hunting Lodge, Miami Springs, FL (Hampton & Ehmann), NRHP-listed
- House at 36 Aegean Avenue, 36 Aegean Ave., Tampa, FL (Hampton, Martin L.), NRHP-listed
- House at 36 Columbia Drive, 36 Columbia Dr., Tampa, FL (Hampton, Martin L.), NRHP-listed
- One or more works in Lenoir Downtown Historic District, Roughly bounded by Ashe Ave., Mulberry St., Harper Ave., Church St., and Boundary St., Lenoir, NC (Hampton, Martin L.), NRHP-listed
- Meyer-Kiser Building, 139 N.E. 1st Building, Miami, FL (Hampton, Martin L.), NRHP-listed
- Miami Beach City Hall building, 1130 Washington Avenue, Miami Beach, FL (Hampton, Martin L.)
- One or more works in Normandy Isles Historic District, Roughly by Normandy Shores Golf Course, Indian Creek, Biscayne Bay, Rue Versailles, 71st., Rue Notre Dame, Miami Beach, FL (Feldman, Grossman, Hampton, et al.), NRHP-listed
- Ocean Spray Hotel, 4130 Collins Ave., Miami Beach, FL (Hampton, Martin L.), NRHP-listed
- Osceola Apartment Hotel, 200 Azure Way, Miami Springs, FL (Hampton, Martin L.), NRHP-listed
- Penthouse Court, 1620 Pennsylvania Ave., Miami Beach, FL (Hampton, Martin L.)
- Meyer-Kiser Building, 139 N.E. 1st Building, Miami, FL (Hampton, Martin L.), NRHP-listed
- Spanish Apartments, 16 E. Davis Blvd., Tampa, FL (Hampton, Martin L.), NRHP-listed
- The Home of Walter Collins Hardesty, Sr. (c1924), Dixie Highway, Ormond Beach, FL (Hampton, Martin L. and Ehmann, Emil August)
