= Lenoir High School =

Historic school building in North Carolina, United States

- U.S. National Register of Historic Places
- U.S. Historic district
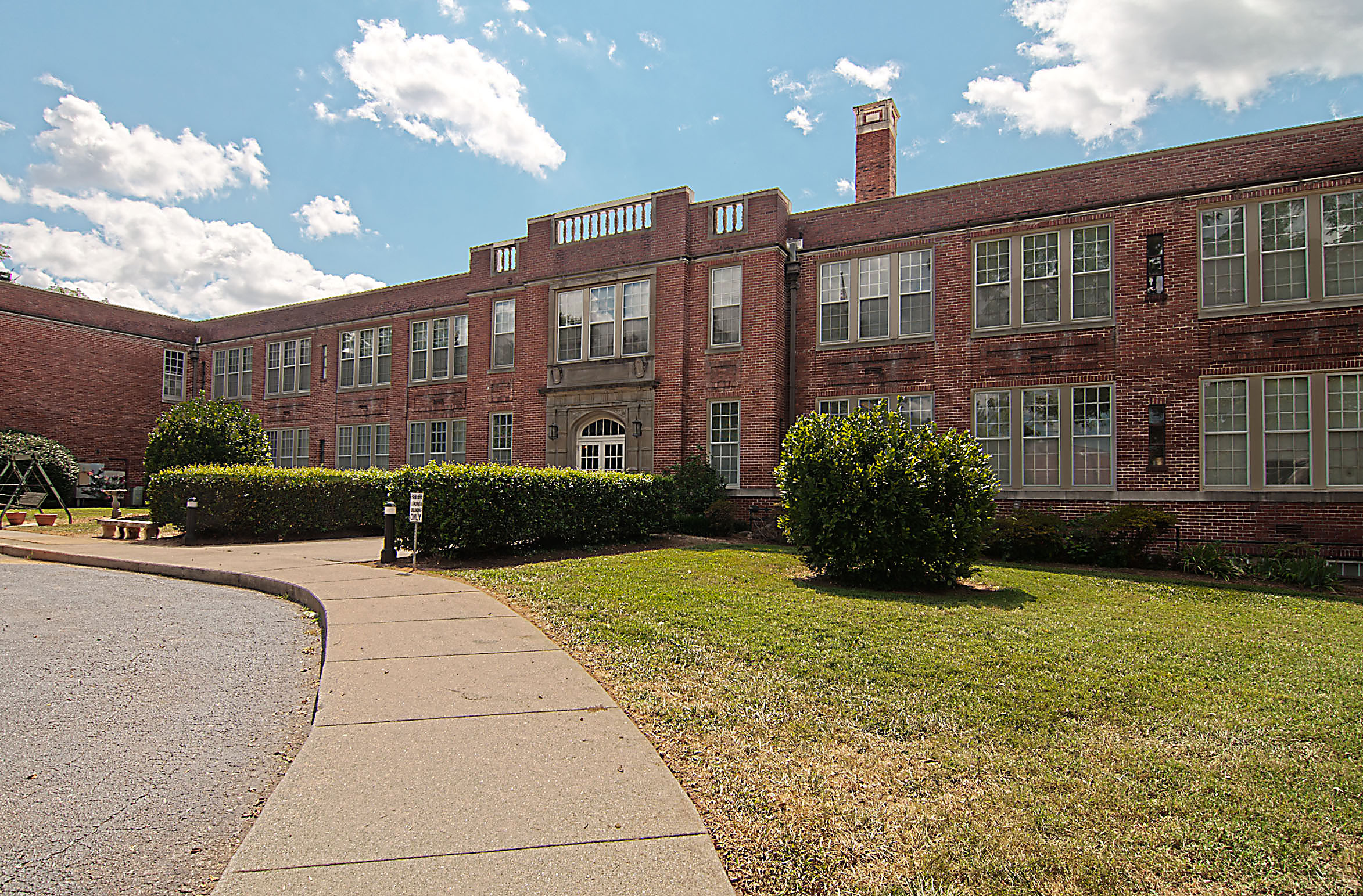

- Location within North Carolina Location within the United States
- Location: 100 Willow St. SW, Lenoir, North Carolina
- Coordinates: 35°54′41″N 81°32′37″W
- Area: 6.5 acres (2.6 ha)
- Built: 1922, 1935-1937, 1962
- Architect: Benton & Benton; Clemmer, Robert
- Architectural style: Classical Revival
- NRHP reference No.: 90001146
- Added to NRHP: August 2, 1990

Lenoir High School is a historic high school complex and national historic district located at Lenoir, Caldwell County, North Carolina, United States.

It was designed by the architectural firm Benton & Benton and built in 1922. It is a two-story, Classical Revival-style brick school with cast stone detailing. An addition was made in 1962. Connected to the main building by brick walls is the contributing 1935–1937 band building with additions. The property also has an original stone retaining wall.

Lenoir High School closed its doors in 1977, when it merged with Gamewell-Collettsville High School and moved across town to form West Caldwell High School. The Lenoir High School building was then Willow Street Middle School until 1981. The property was vacant for eight years before becoming a senior housing facility in 1989.

The school was listed on the National Register of Historic Places in 1990.

== Notable alumni ==
- Claude Baker – composer of contemporary classical music
- Jim Broyhill – former U.S. representative and senator from the state of North Carolina
- Bob Gibbons – high school basketball sports scout
- Harry Martin – associate justice of the North Carolina Supreme Court, serving from 1982 to 1992
- Magruder Tuttle – rear admiral in the U.S. Navy
- Rube Walker – MLB catcher
- Verlon "Rube" Walker – MLB coach with the Chicago Cubs 1961–1970
