= WSPF (AM) =

Radio station in Hickory, North Carolina (1963–1987)

WSPF (1000 AM) was a radio station licensed to Hickory, North Carolina, known as "Channel One Radio". The station had a 5,000-watt daytime-only signal, with a transmitter on Tate Boulevard and studios at Second Avenue Southeast and N.C. 127.

== History ==
WSPF signed on in October 1963 with a rock and roll format. In March 1982, the format changed to modern country.

On August 8, 1985, morning DJ Gary "Mountain Man" McMahan began raising funds to rescue 4-year-old Barney the Buffalo, who weighed 1,650 pounds (750 kg). Barney escaped from a farm in Franklin County, North Carolina, attacked a car, and was purchased for $1 by E.B. Harris, who vowed to slaughter the animal unless someone raised the money to take care of him. McMahan made Barney his show's mascot and vowed to raise $1000. After three sleepless nights for McMahan, the goal was met August 10. Newton musician Buddy Rhodes wrote "The Ballad of Barney the Buffalo" and recorded it with his band Hard Times for WSPF. A Philadelphia radio station interviewed McMahan, and the station received calls form San Diego, California, and Monroe, Washington. A store at an area mall printed "Bucks for Barney" t-shirts, which bartenders at one area location wore while asking customers for money. Eventually, WSPF raised $1,600, of which $1,135.13 went to Harris; the rest went to charity. A.B. Cooke's Buffalo Ranch, a 71-acre park with a petting zoo and a lake in Cabarrus County, took Barney. In January 1986, Cooke sold the ranch, but WSPF operations manager Scott Conley said a Catawba farmer agreed to take Barney if necessary.

Willis Deal owned Piedmont Broadcasting, which owned the station for its entire history. On December 31, 1987, WSPF signed off for the last time. Deal, retiring at age 68, sold the station's equipment and property—but not the license—for $450,000 to Westcom Ltd., the owners of WIRC and WXRC. DJ Scott Conley, who had been part of WSPF for 18 years, moved to WKGX in nearby Lenoir.
