= WSPF =

WSPF may refer to:

- Wisconsin Secure Program Facility, a Wisconsin Department of Corrections prison for men
- WSPF (AM), a defunct radio station (1000 AM) formerly licensed to serve Hickory, North Carolina, United States
- WSPF-CD, a low-power television station (channel 36, virtual 35) licensed to serve Tampa, Florida, United States
