= Mike Pope =

American football player and coach (born 1942)

Personal information
- Born: March 15, 1942 (age 84); Monroe, North Carolina, U.S.

Career information
- High school: East Mecklenburg (Charlotte, North Carolina)
- College: Lenoir–Rhyne

Career history
- Lenoir HS (NC) (1964–1965) Head coach; Olympic HS (NC) (1966) Backfield coach; Samuel W. Wolfson HS (FL) (1967–1968) Backfield coach; Lake Wales HS (FL) (1969) Head coach; Florida State (1970) Graduate assistant; Florida State (1971–1974) Assistant coach; Texas Tech (1975–1977) Assistant coach; Ole Miss (1978–1982) Assistant coach; New York Giants (1983–1991) Tight ends coach; Cincinnati Bengals (1992) Tight ends coach; Cincinnati Bengals (1993) Offensive coordinator; New England Patriots (1994) Running backs coach; New England Patriots (1995–1996) Tight ends coach; Washington Redskins (1997–1999) Tight ends coach; New York Giants (2000–2013) Tight ends coach; Dallas Cowboys (2014–2016) Tight ends coach

Awards and highlights
- 4× Super Bowl champion (XXI, XXV, XLII, XLVI)
- Coaching profile at Pro Football Reference

Michael L. Pope (born March 14, 1942) is an American former coach in the National Football League (NFL). He is best known as the tight ends coach for the New York Giants, serving on all four of their Super Bowl championship teams.

== Early life ==
Pope attended Lenoir–Rhyne University in Hickory, North Carolina and played college football for the Lenoir–Rhyne Bears as a fullback from 1960 to 1963. In 1960, Pope's freshman year, Lenoir–Rhyne won the NAIA Football National Championship. As a senior in 1963, Pope was the team's captain.

== Coaching career ==
=== High school and college coaching ===
After graduating from Lenoir–Rhyne in 1964, Pope began his coaching career that fall as athletic director and head football coach at Lenoir High School in Lenoir. He moved to Olympic High School in Charlotte in 1966 and then to Samuel W. Wolfson High School in Jacksonville, Florida, serving as backfield coach at both schools. In 1969, Pope was hired as athletic director and head football coach at Lake Wales High School in Lake Wales, Florida.

Pope moved to the college level in 1970 as a graduate assistant at Florida State University. In February 1971, he was appointed director of high school relations for the Florida State Seminoles by newly hired head coach Larry Jones. Bill Parcells and Steve Sloan were also members of Jones's staff.

=== New York Giants (1983–1991) ===
Pope coached for the New York Giants for 23 years, the longest of any coach in franchise history. During his first stint in New York, he coached Mark Bavaro to two Pro Bowl appearances. Pope was on the Giants coaching staff for both Super Bowl XXI and Super Bowl XXV.

=== Cincinnati Bengals (1992–1993) ===
==== Tight ends coach (1992) ====
Pope was hired by the Bengals prior to the 1992 season and spent one year as the tight ends coach.

==== Offensive coordinator (1993) ====
Pope was promoted to offensive coordinator on January 8, 1993. The 1993 Bengals finished with a 3–13 record, including losing all eight road games and starting the season 0–10. The team finished with the 28th (last) ranked offense in the league.

=== New England Patriots (1994–1996) ===
Pope was hired by the New England Patriots prior to the 1994 season to serve as running backs coach for the Patriots. After one season, he was moved to tight ends coach, where he served for the next two years.

=== Washington Redskins (1997–1999) ===
Pope was hired by the Washington Redskins prior to the 1997 season. On February 10, 2000, he left the Redskins and returned to the New York Giants.

=== Second stint with the Giants (2000–2013) ===
Pope was hired by the Giants prior to the 2000 season. He spent the next 14 years as the team's tight ends coach, where he was instrumental in the development of players such as Jeremy Shockey, Jake Ballard, and Kevin Boss. Pope was the lone holdover from Jim Fassel's staff who coached with Tom Coughlin. During this time, he won Super Bowl rings when the Giants defeated the New England Patriots in both Super Bowl XLII and Super Bowl XLVI. On January 15, 2014, it was announced that Pope would be let go by the Giants.

=== Dallas Cowboys (2014–2016) ===
Pope was hired by the Dallas Cowboys on January 22, 2014. After the Cowboys defeated the Giants on October 19, 2014, Pope was given a game ball. Pope retired on March 1, 2017, bringing an end to a 47-year coaching career, including 34 years in the NFL.

== Personal life ==
Pope is married to Lee with two sons, Travus and Daron, and four grandchildren. Pope's personal connection to the Giants can be seen in the choice of name for one of his grandsons, Wellington, named for Giants' late owner Wellington Mara. He was diagnosed with prostate cancer in January 2003.
