= Mary's Grove =

Historic house in North Carolina, United States

- U.S. National Register of Historic Places
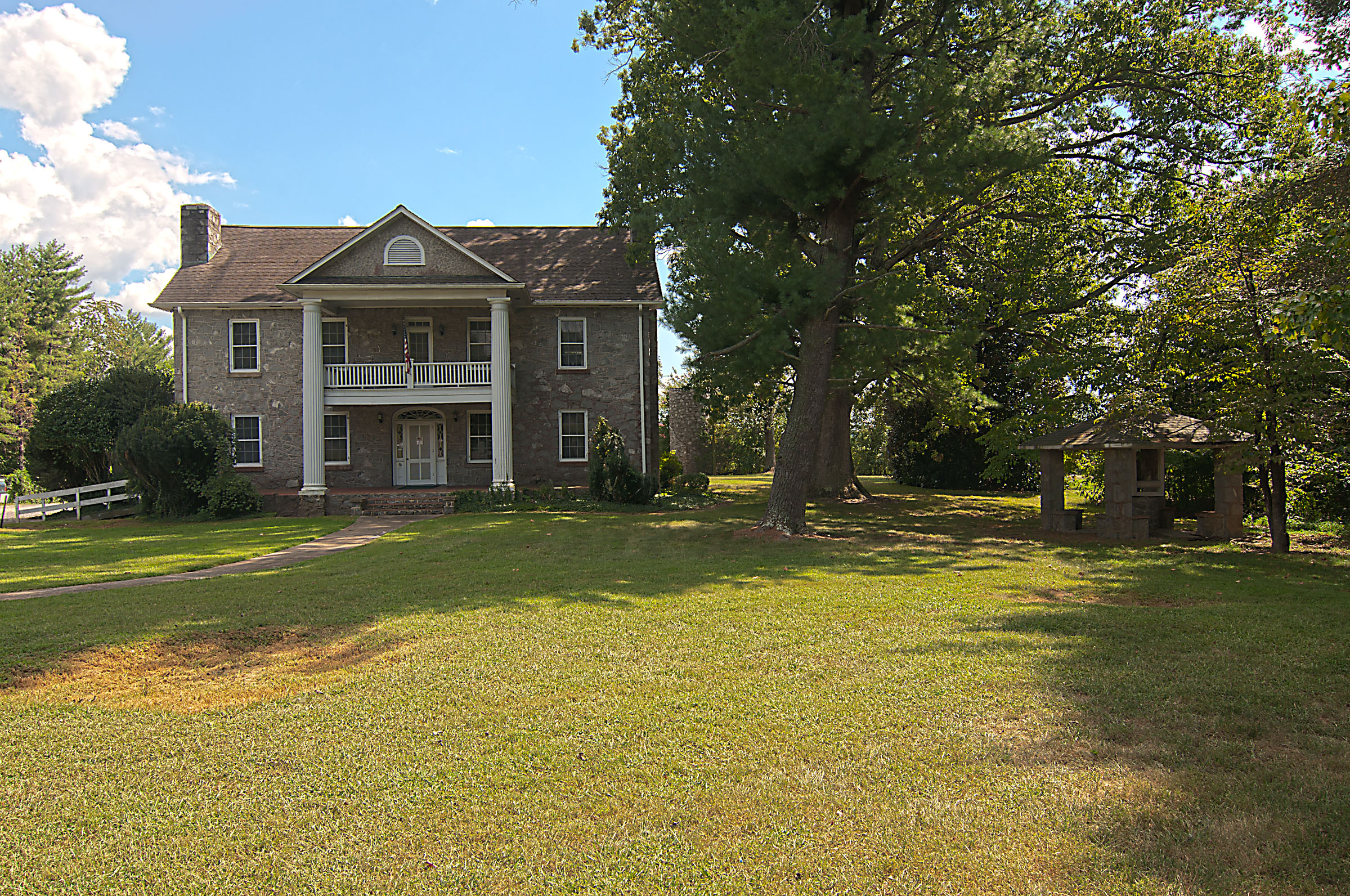

- Location within North Carolina Location within the United States
- Location: 2121 Harper Ave., SW, Lenoir, North Carolina
- Coordinates: 35°53′54″N 81°33′56″W
- Area: 2.2 acres (0.89 ha)
- Built: 1932
- Built by: Lyons, Leslie McDonald; et.al.
- Architectural style: Colonial Revival
- NRHP reference No.: 01000418
- Added to NRHP: April 25, 2050

Mary's Grove, also known as the Rabb House, is a historic home located at Lenoir, Caldwell County, North Carolina. It was built between 1932 and 1934, and is a two-story, Colonial Revival-style stone house. Also on the property are the contributing stone well-house, silo, and dairy. The buildings were constructed by master stonemasons Leslie (1900-1957), Clarence (1903–1981), and Earl Lyons (1912-1984).

The house was listed on the National Register of Historic Places in 2001.
