= The Congress Building =

- Congress Building
- U.S. National Register of Historic Places
- Downtown Miami Development of Regional Impact Historic Site
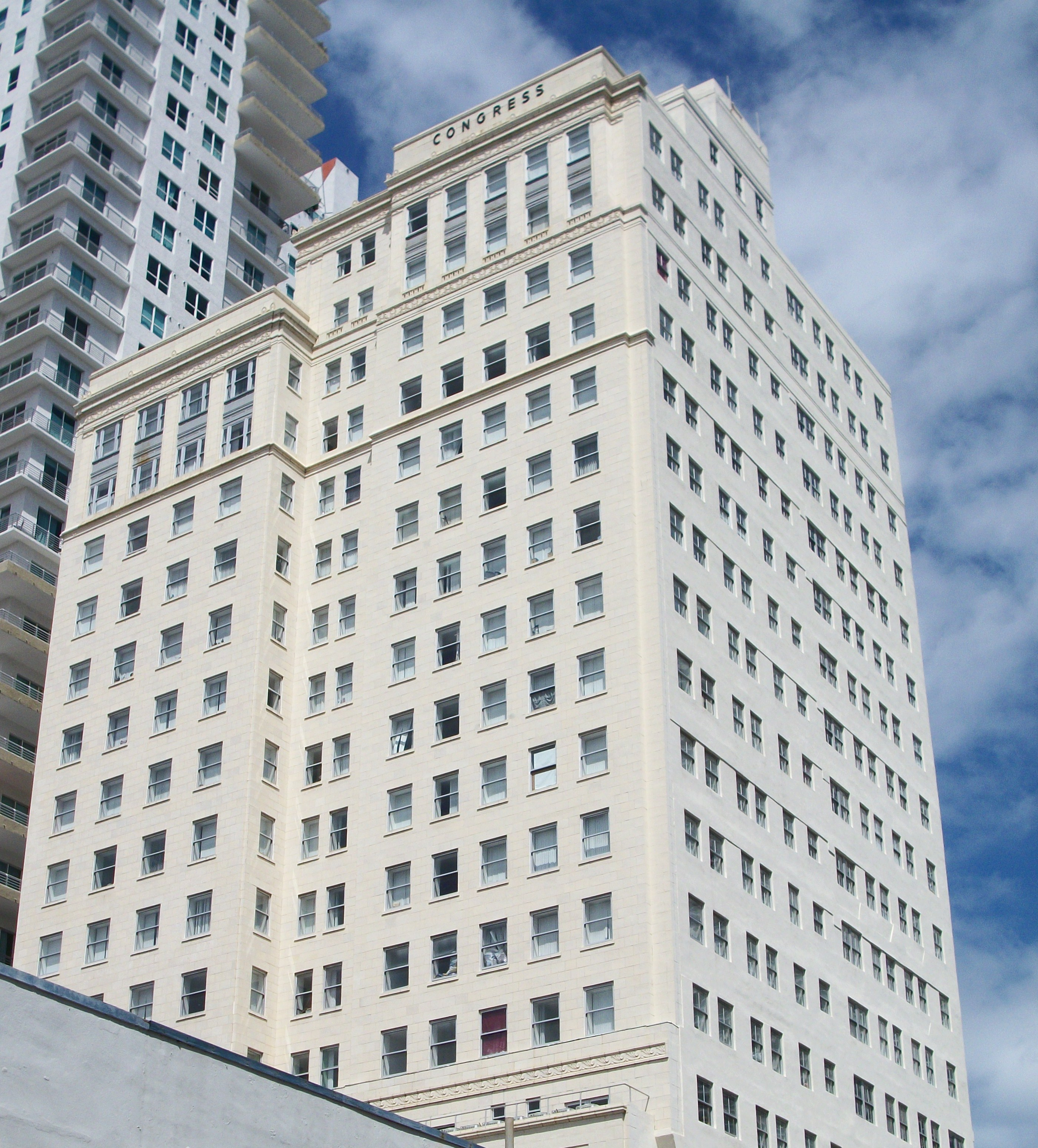
- The Congress Building seen from Northeast 1st Street on April 5, 2010.

- Location within Florida
- Location: 111 Northeast 2nd Avenue, Downtown Miami, Florida; United States
- Coordinates: 25°46′32.088″N 80°11′24.8274″W
- Built: 1923, expanded in 1926
- Architect: Martin L. Hampton Associates and W. S. Tyler, Inc.
- Architectural style: Mediterranean Revival with Chicago school and Neoclassical elements
- NRHP reference No.: 85000553
- Added to NRHP: March 14, 1985

The Congress Building, or simply the Congress Building, is a historic skyscraper in Downtown Miami, Florida, United States. It is located at the address of 111 Northeast 2nd Avenue. The Congress Building was added to the National Register of Historic Places on March 14, 1985, and is locally identified a historic site in the Downtown Miami Development of Regional Impact (DRI). The Congress Building was formerly office space until 1999, when it was restored and converted to apartments. At street level, the building contains retail space which is leased to a number of stores and services including a financial establishment, The Loft condo sales center, beauty salon and café. Originally the building was five stories; the additional 16 were added on later.
