= Meyer–Kiser Building =

- U.S. National Register of Historic Places
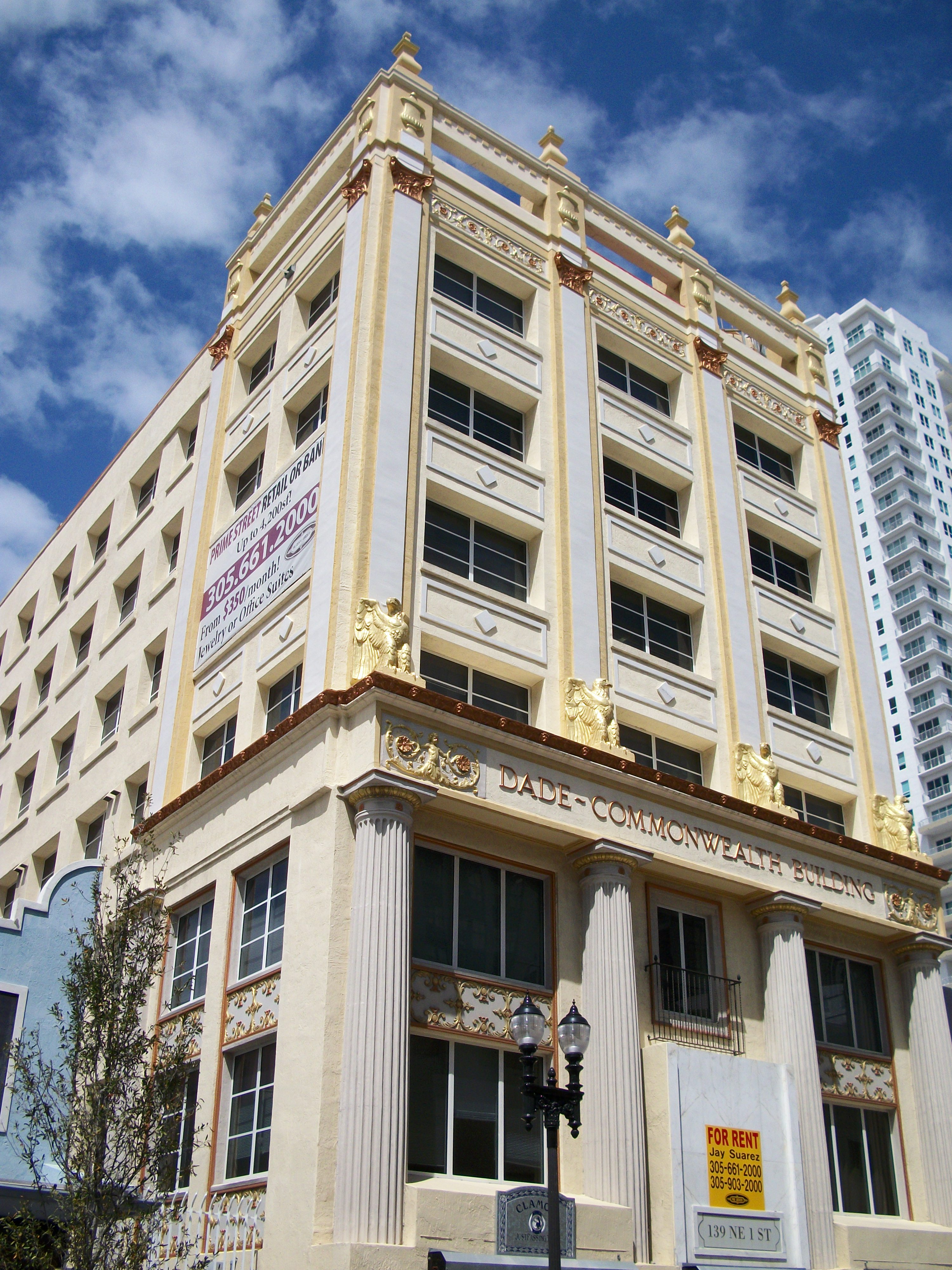

- Location within Miami Location within Florida Location within the United States
- Location: 139 NE 1st St., Miami, Florida
- Coordinates: 25°46′31″N 80°11′28″W
- Built: 1925–26
- Architect: Martin L. Hampton
- Architectural style: Classical Revival, Chicago
- NRHP reference No.: 88002991
- Added to NRHP: January 5, 1989

The Meyer–Kiser Building (also known as the Dade Commonwealth Building) is a historic U.S. building in Miami, Florida. It was built in 1925, the same year the Dade County Courthouse began construction. It is located at 139 NE 1st street. On January 4, 1999, it was added to the U.S. National Register of Historic Places. The building was once one of the tallest in Miami, and Dade County, completed the same year as the Freedom Tower, but was badly damaged during the 1926 Miami hurricane, and it was reduced from 17 to 7 stories. In 2015, new owners announced a plan to restore the building close to its original design. It didn't happen as of 2023.
