= WJRI =

- Lenoir, North Carolina; United States
- Frequency: 1340 kHz
- Branding: Star 94.7 & 100.5

Programming
- Format: Adult contemporary
- Affiliations: Compass Media Networks

Ownership
- Owner: Foothills Radio Group
- Sister stations: WKGX, WKVS

History
- First air date: March 15, 1947

Technical information
- Licensing authority: FCC
- Facility ID: 73149
- Class: C
- Power: 1,000 watts unlimited
- Transmitter coordinates: 35°53′39″N 81°33′30″W
- Translators: 94.7 W234DG (Lenoir); 100.5 W263CP (Lenoir)

Links
- Public license information: Public file; LMS
- Webcast: Listen Live
- Website: www.gofoothills.com/stations/just-right-radio-1340-100-5/

WJRI (1340 AM) is a radio station broadcasting an adult contemporary format. Licensed to Lenoir, North Carolina, United States, the station is currently owned by Foothills Radio Group.

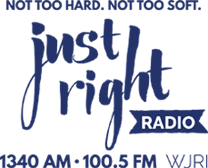
Previous logo

On May 29, 2017, WJRI changed their format from news/talk to an oldies format branded as "Just Right Radio."

In 2020, WJRI changed their format from oldies to adult contemporary, branded as "Star 94.7 & 100.5."

They have “Anna & Raven” in the morning, Dave Williams with the “Workday Escape” from 10 - 2 and John Tesh in the afternoon's Monday through Saturday.
