= Ocean Spray Hotel =

- U.S. National Register of Historic Places
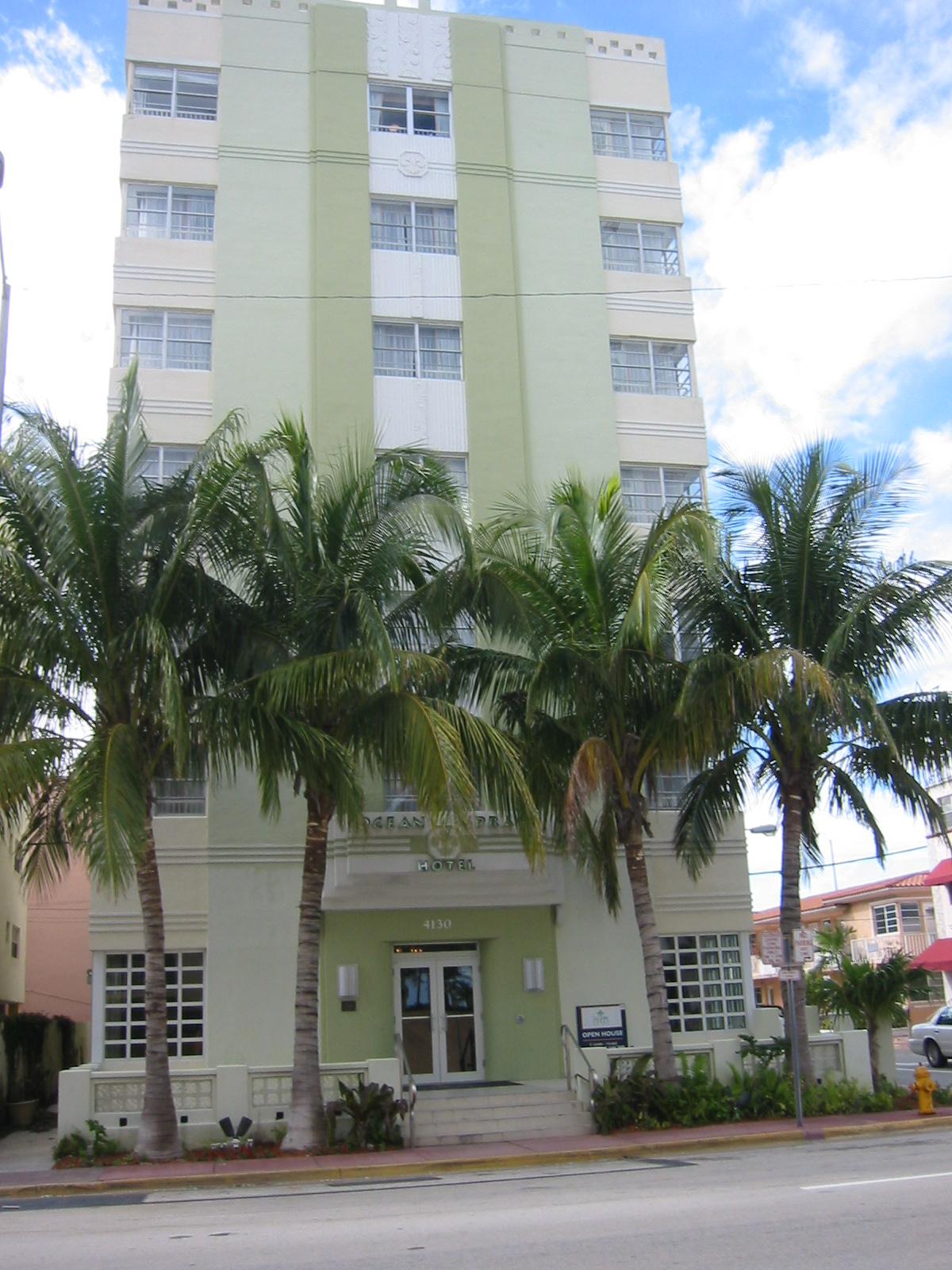
- Location: Miami Beach, Miami-Dade County, Florida
- Coordinates: 25°48′54.01″N 80°7′12.34″W
- Built: 1936
- Built by: Belsham & Hampton
- Architect: M. L. Hampton Associates
- Architectural style: Moderne
- NRHP reference No.: 04000564
- Added to NRHP: June 2, 2004

The Ocean Spray Hotel (also known as the Carol Arms Hotel) is a historic hotel in Miami Beach, Florida, United States built in 1937. It is located at 4130 Collins Avenue (Mid-Beach). On June 2, 2004, it was added to the U.S. National Register of Historic Places.

The architects of the building were M. L. Hampton Associates, and the builders were Belsham & Hampton.

The Ocean Spray Hotel is an example of original Art-Deco architecture which is outside the Art-Deco-District of Miami Beach.
