= Petit Douy =

Coordinates: 25.7580°N 80.1935°W

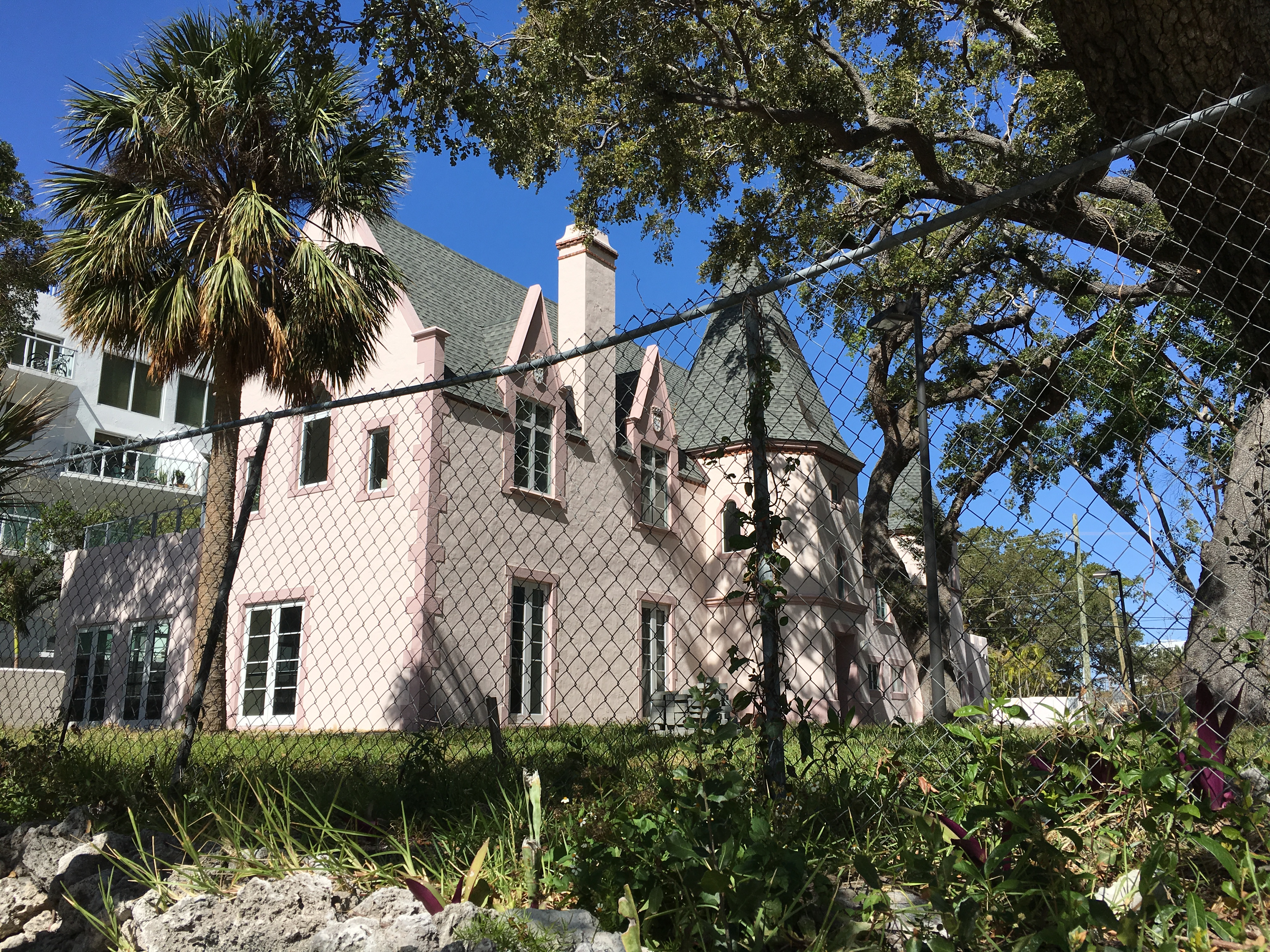
Petit Douy

Petit Douy, or Château Petit Douy, is a City of Miami historic property located at 1500 Brickell Avenue in the Brickell neighborhood of Miami, Florida, USA.

The two-story Period Revival French Château was built in 1931, designed by architect Martin L. Hampton. The then-residential house was nominated for historic designation in 1983 by the City of Miami. The design and name of the house was inspired by a château in Douy, France, after its original owners, local attorneys John Murrell and Ethel Murrell, visited that country.

Located in an expensive and highly redeveloped luxury market, the zoning was changed to restrict uses such as condominiums to prevent demolition; however, the new zoning allowed commercial use of the property such as a storefront, office or restaurant. The property was sold to the owner of a pharmaceutical company in 2006. In 2015, the building began renovation to be turned into a restaurant or a club.
