= Penthouse Court =

Historic property

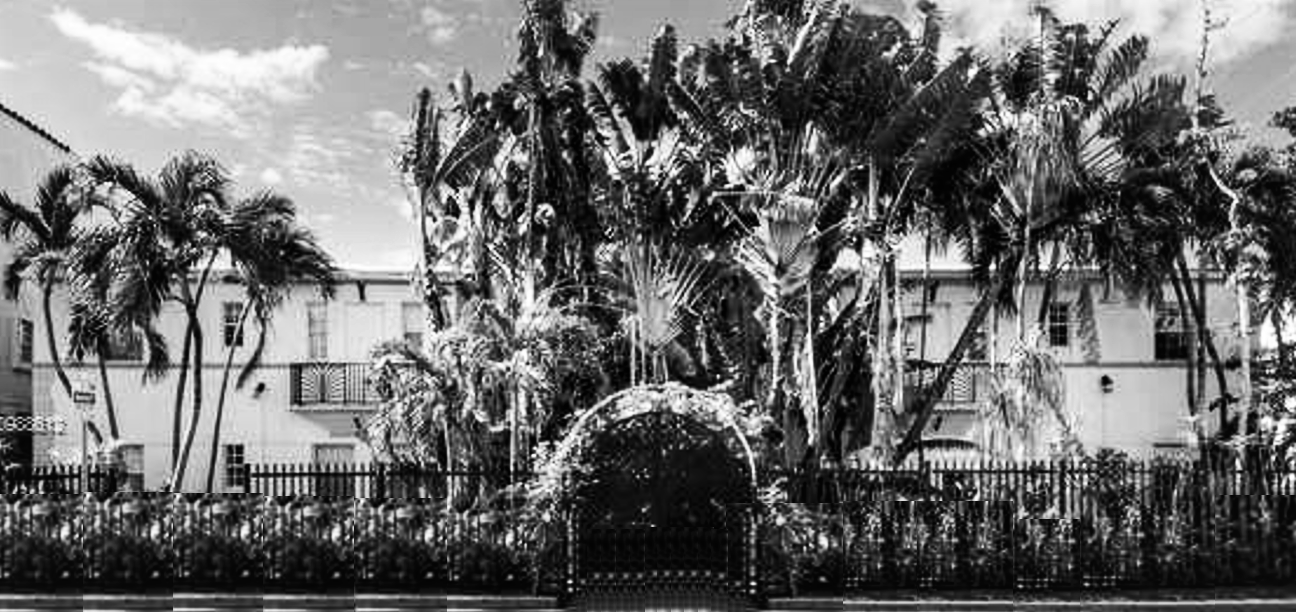
- Penthouse Court, 1620-22 Pennsylvania Ave, Miami Beach
- Interactive map of the Penthouse Court area

General information
- Architectural style: Mediterranean Revival
- Location: 1620-22 Pennsylvania Avenue, Miami Beach, Florida
- Coordinates: 25.789838°N 80.134643°W
- Completed: 1935

Penthouse Court Apartments, today called Les Jardins of South Beach Condominium, is an historic property with Mediterranean Revival architecture and Art Deco features, located at 1620-22 Pennsylvania Avenue, Miami Beach, Florida, USA and is in the Miami Beach Architectural District, Florida, USA.

It was Designed by Martin L. Hampton who was a renowned architect in the 20's and 30's. He is best known his work in Miami, Miami Beach, Coral Gables and Hollywood. Among his most notable projects are the Great Southern Hotel of Hollywood (1924), The Bathing Casino of Hollywood (1925), the Country Club of Coral Gables (1923) and the Miami Beach City Hall (1927).

In the late 1930s, investment in the real estate in the Miami Beach area became popular, so the Architect started to design Mediterranean Revival houses and apartments in the South Beach area, especially around Flamingo Park. Penthouse Courts was built during this period and is an evident expression of this style.

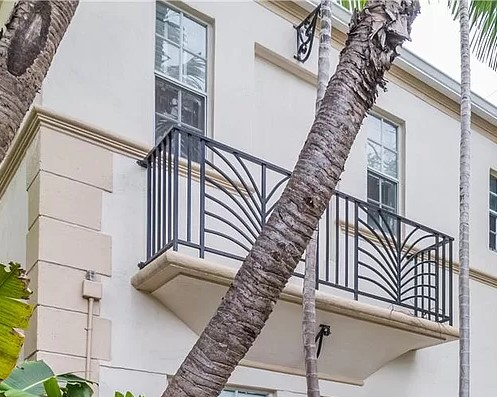
Mediterranean style balcony

The apartments are distributed in two symmetrical buildings of three floors. For each building, the first and second floors have three apartments as well as one penthouse on the third floor. Each building has two balconies on the second floor and one on the third floor, all of them in typical Mediterranean Style. The roof is of Spanish tile. The entrance is an iron "flamingo" gate that opens up on to a beautiful tropical garden. Inside the building the original iron staircase railings hand forged in the 30s are still strongly in place together with an iron gate leading to the Penthouse on the 3rd floor.

Building permit 6240 was released by the City of Miami Beach in 1934 and the building was completed in 1935 in the Art Deco Area of South Beach. It is listed in the City of Miami Beach Historic Property Viewer

A list of Martin L. Hampton's work can be found on the National Register of Historic Places on page 17 of the Nomination Form of the Congress Building. Penthouse Court is listed as designed by the architect in 1934.

Located one block from Lincoln Road the apartments are famous for their beautiful mosaics both in the common areas and garden and also throughout the stairwells and some interiors of both buildings. These unique mosaics enrich this property and complete the Mediterranean vibe.

The building is listed on the RuskinaARC historic datatabase

== Penthouse Court Vintage Photos ==
Original design by L. Hampton featured 14 units with a tropical garden in the front, parking area in the back of the building and entrance was via Pennsylvania Avenue.
The building has not been modified since its original design, is still in its original Art Deco form, each of the two buildings is still divided in 7 units. From the vintage pictures the penthouse apartments on the third floor, the mediterranean balconies, the tropical garden and the parking area are all visible. The Lincoln Theater can also be spotted in the photos just half a block away from Penthouse Court Apartments.

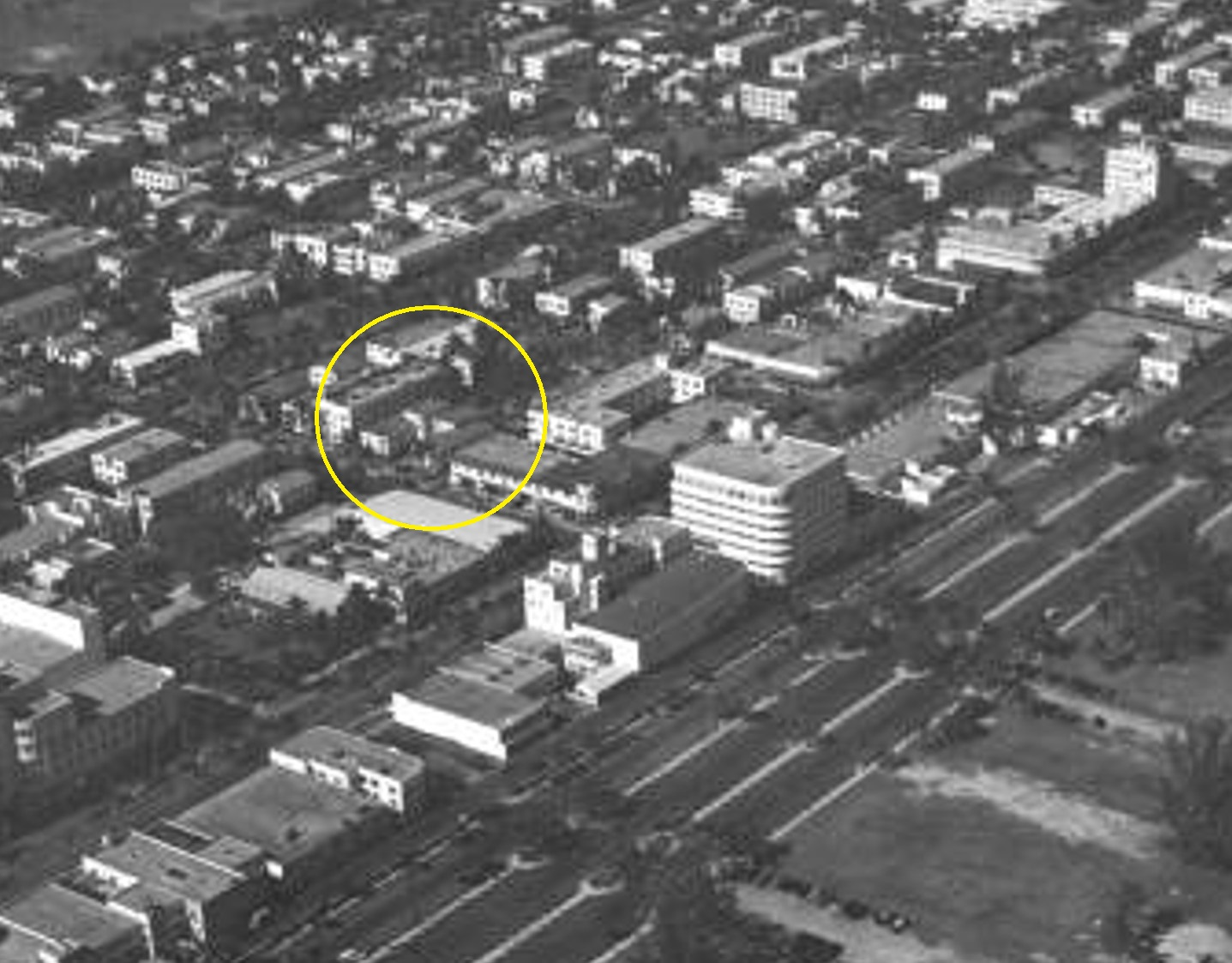
North West aerial view of Penthouse Court in 1939

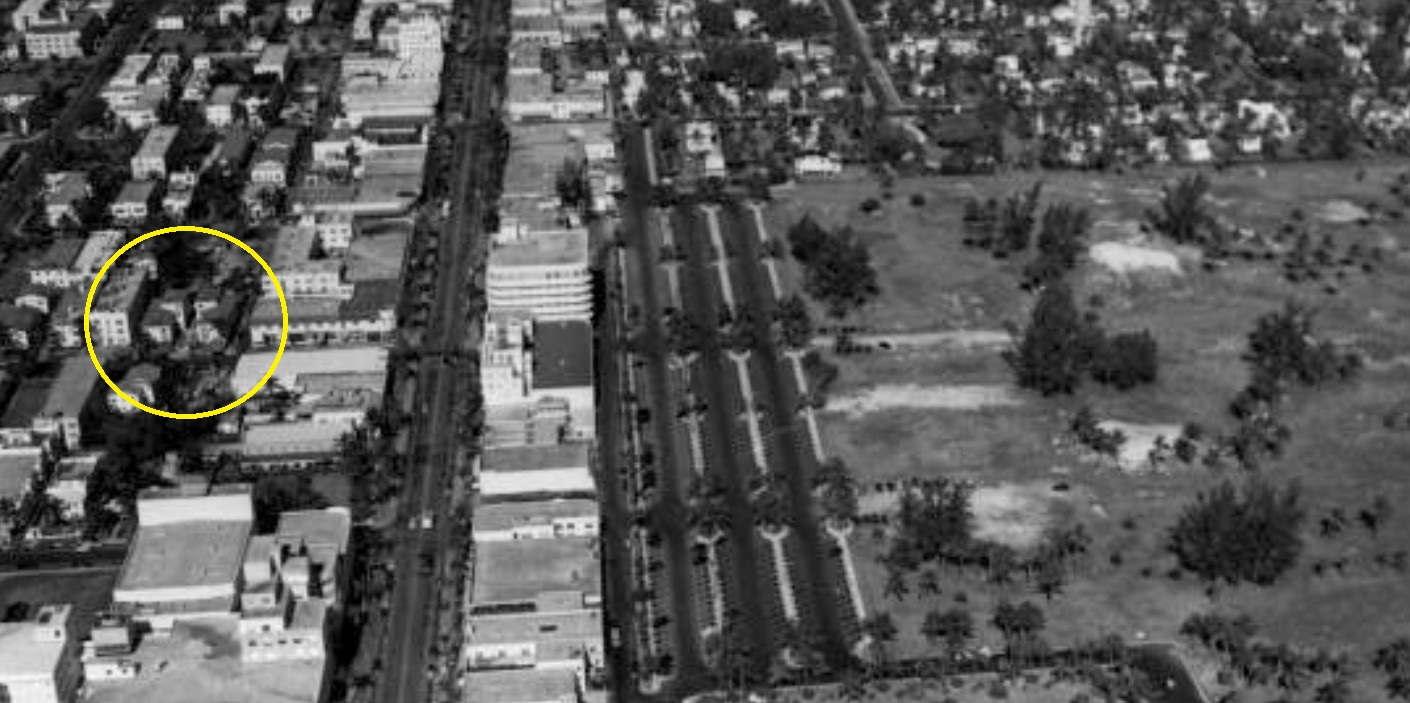
North aerial view of Penthouse Court in 1948 the Tropical Garden can be seen on the east side of the building,

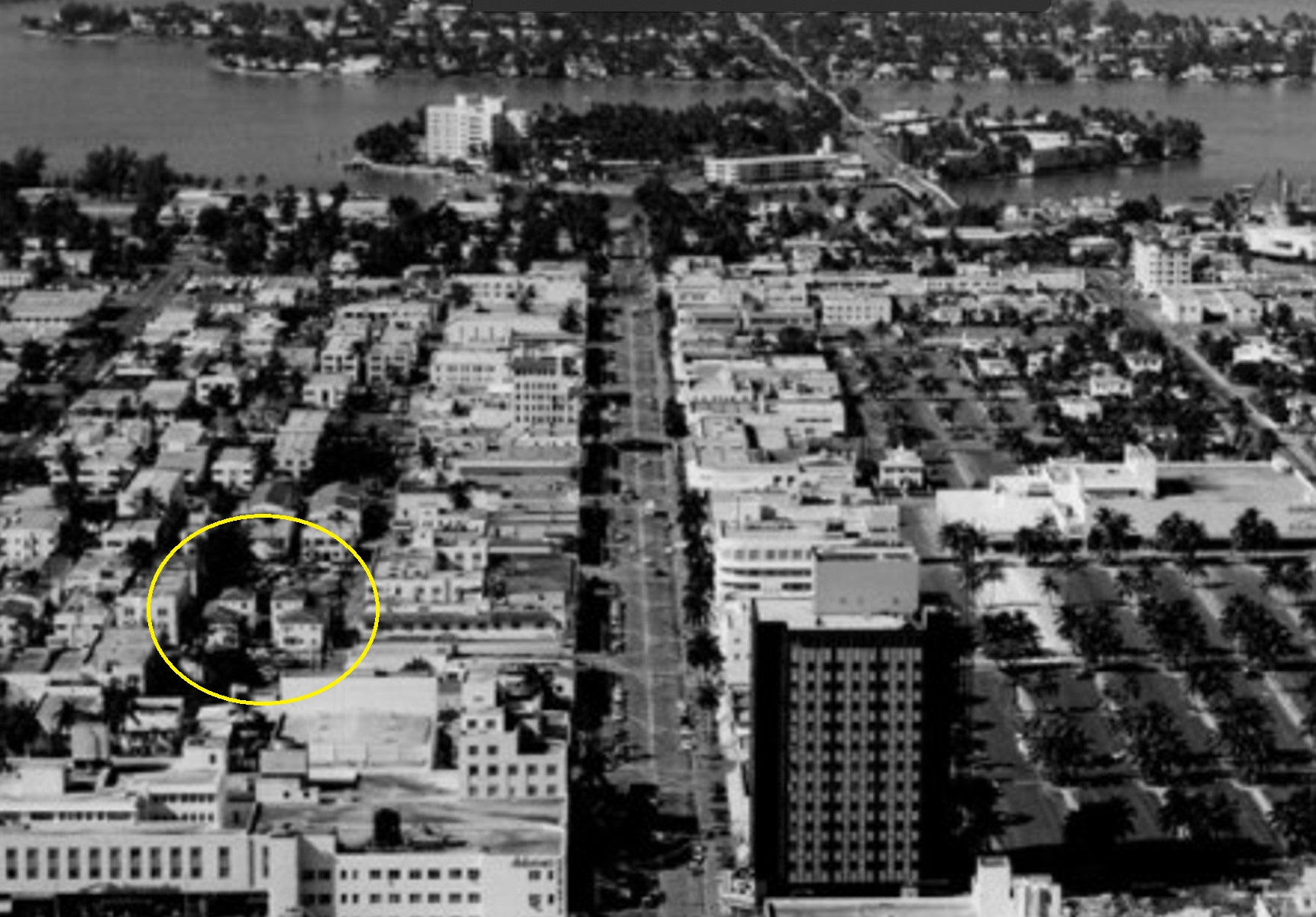
West aerial view in 1956, the mediterranean style balcony on the second floor and the penthouse on third floor are clearly visible.

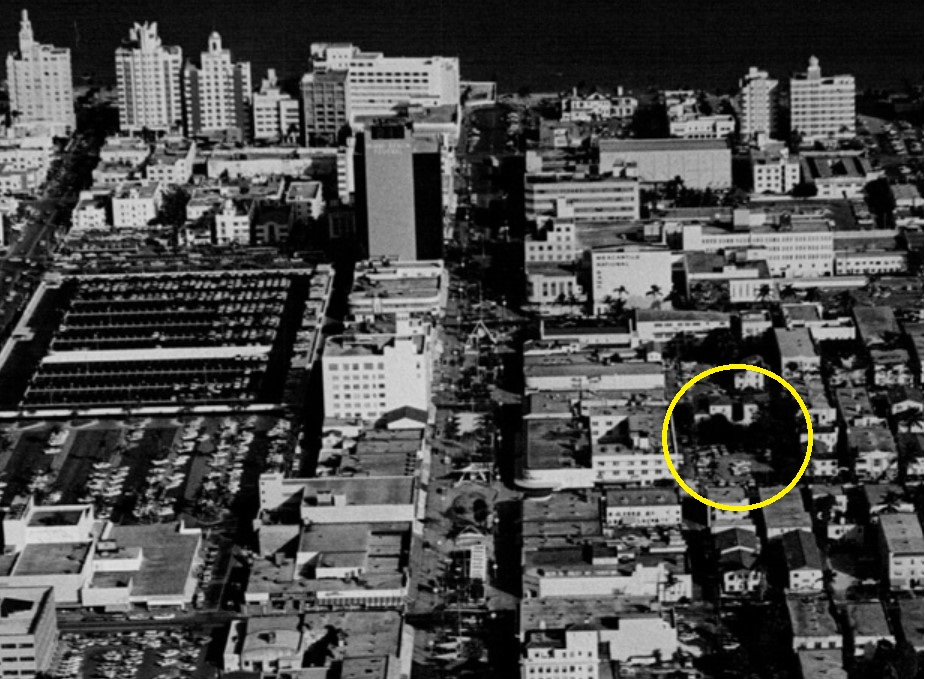
East aerial view of the building in 1959, the parking area is visible on the east side of the building.

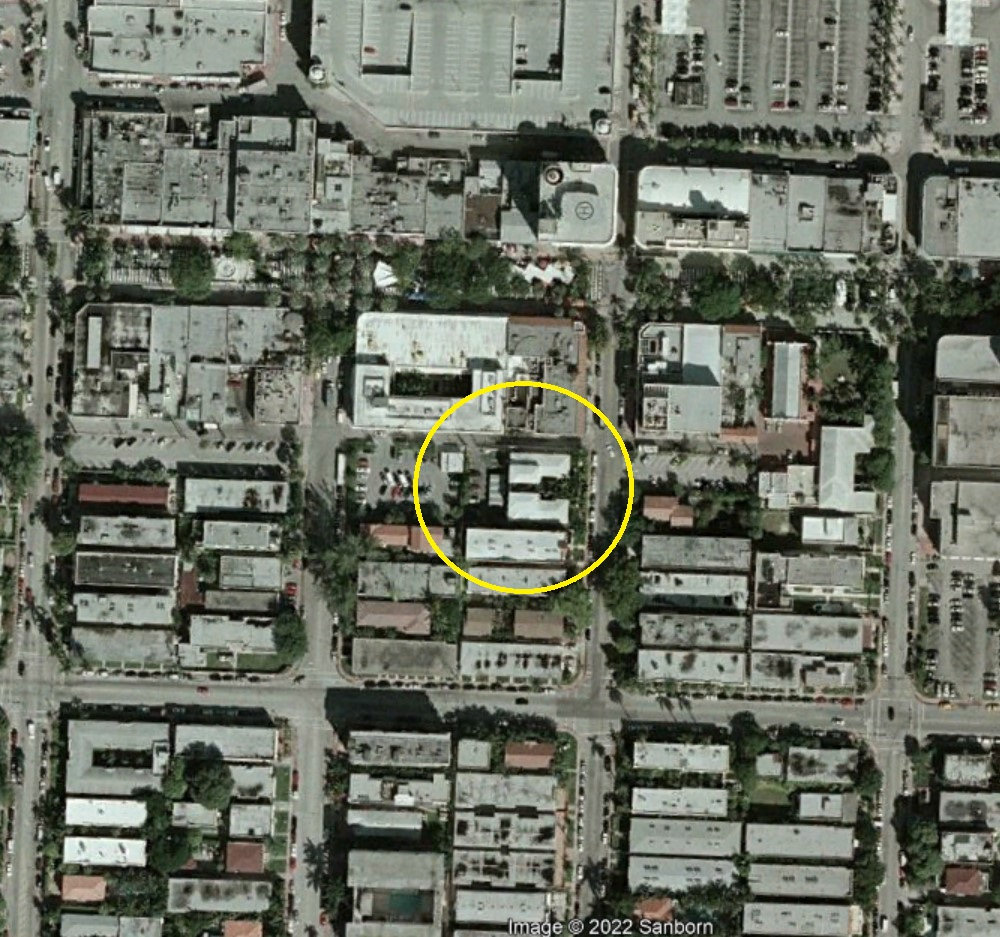
Satellite view of the property in 2002.

== Penthouse Court Mosaics ==
The building is decorated with beautiful mosaics that enhance the interior and exterior of the building.

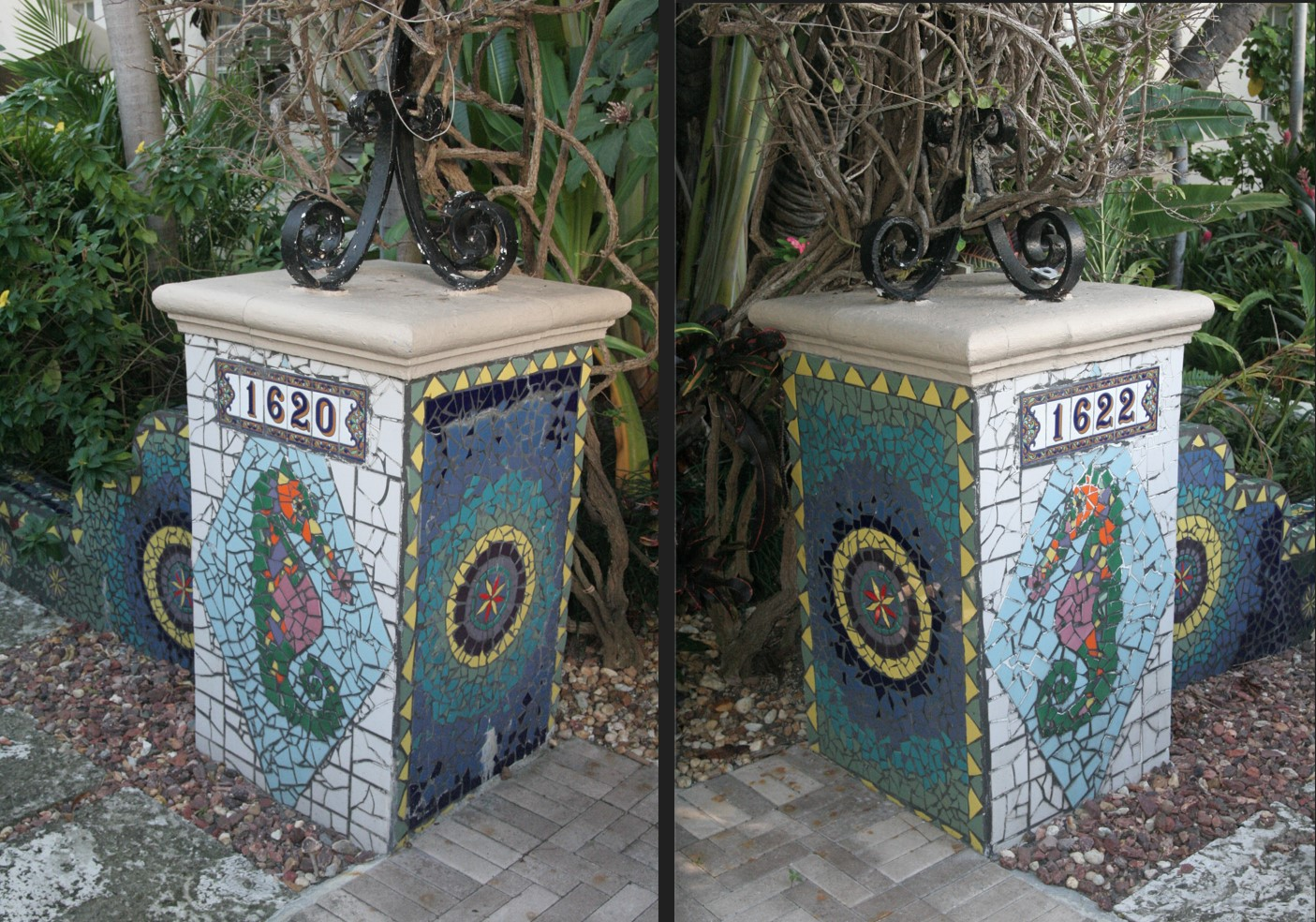
The entrance of the building decorated with seahorse mosaics

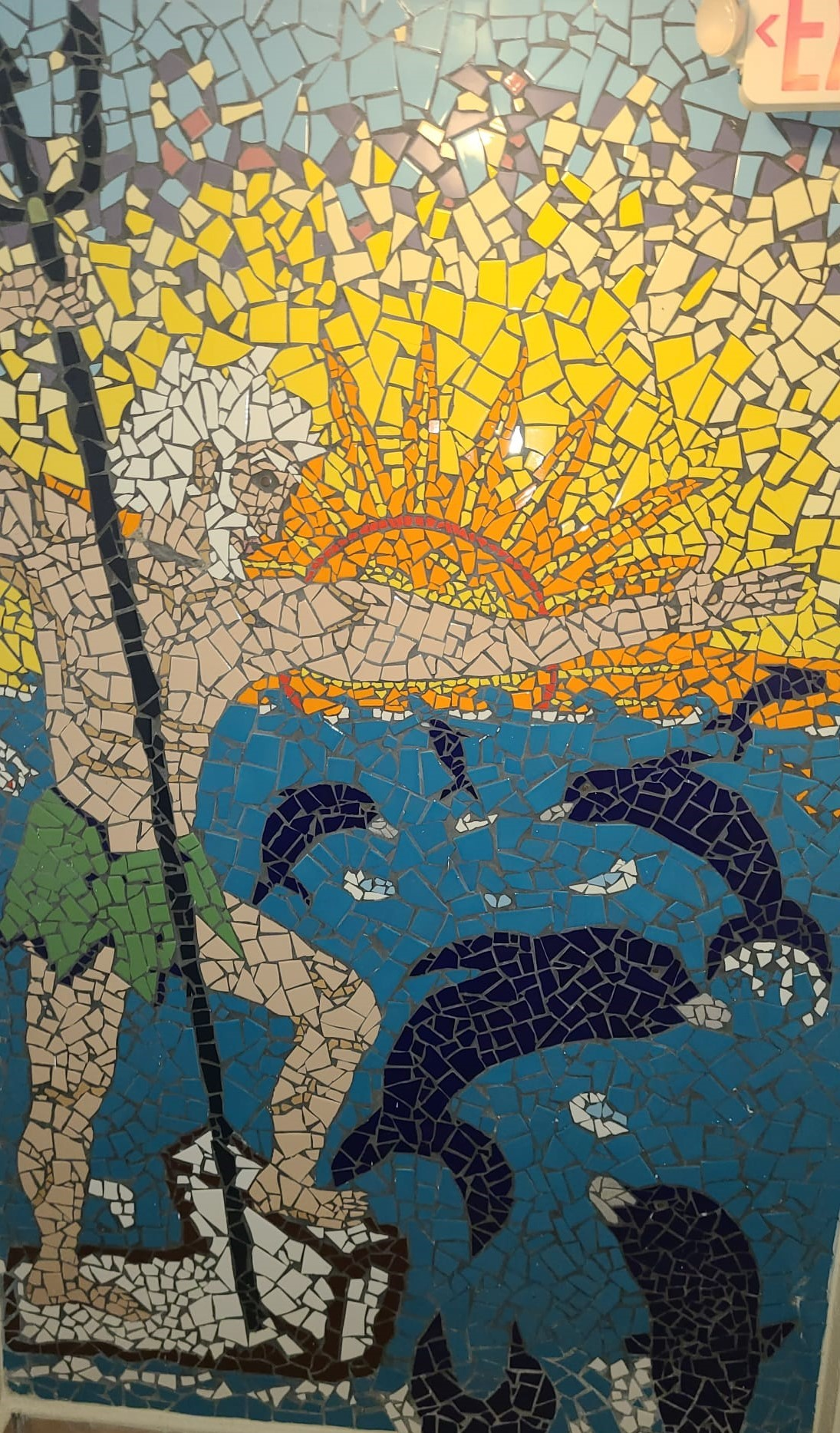
Poseidon an 8 feet high mosaic located on the staircase of 1622 building

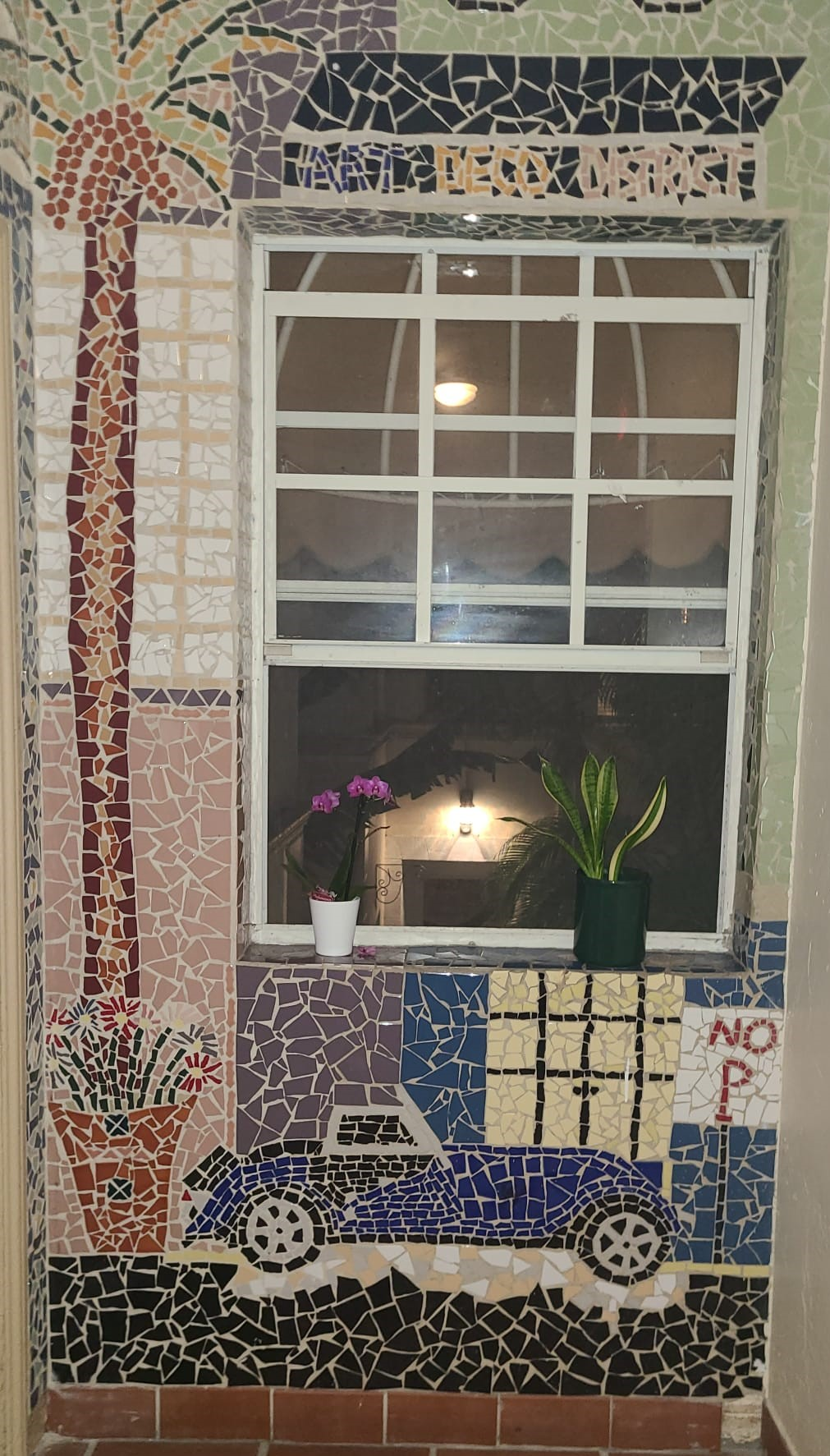
On the landing of first floor of the 1620 building a blue 1930s sport convertible car

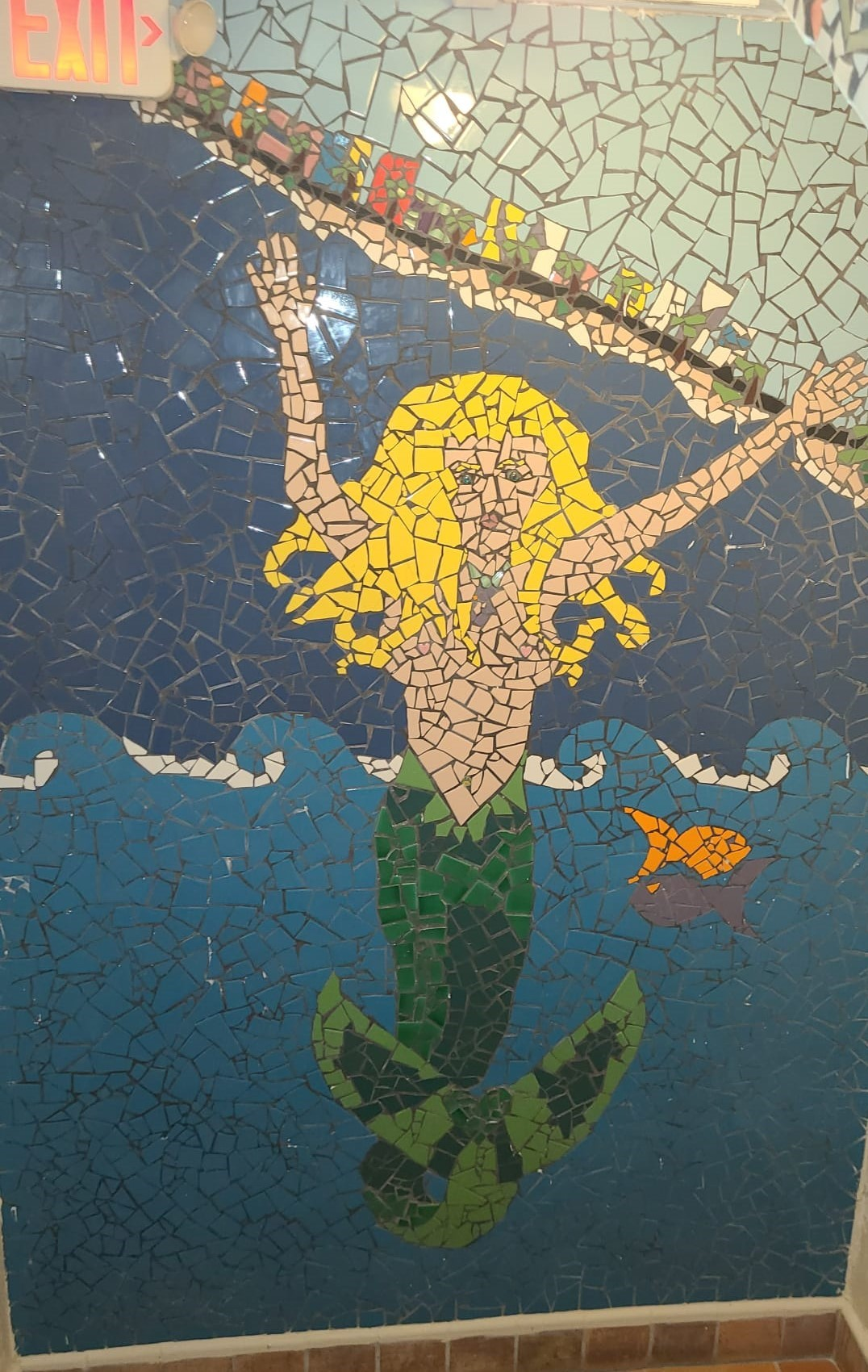
Mermaid an 8 feet high mosaic located on the staircase of 1620 building
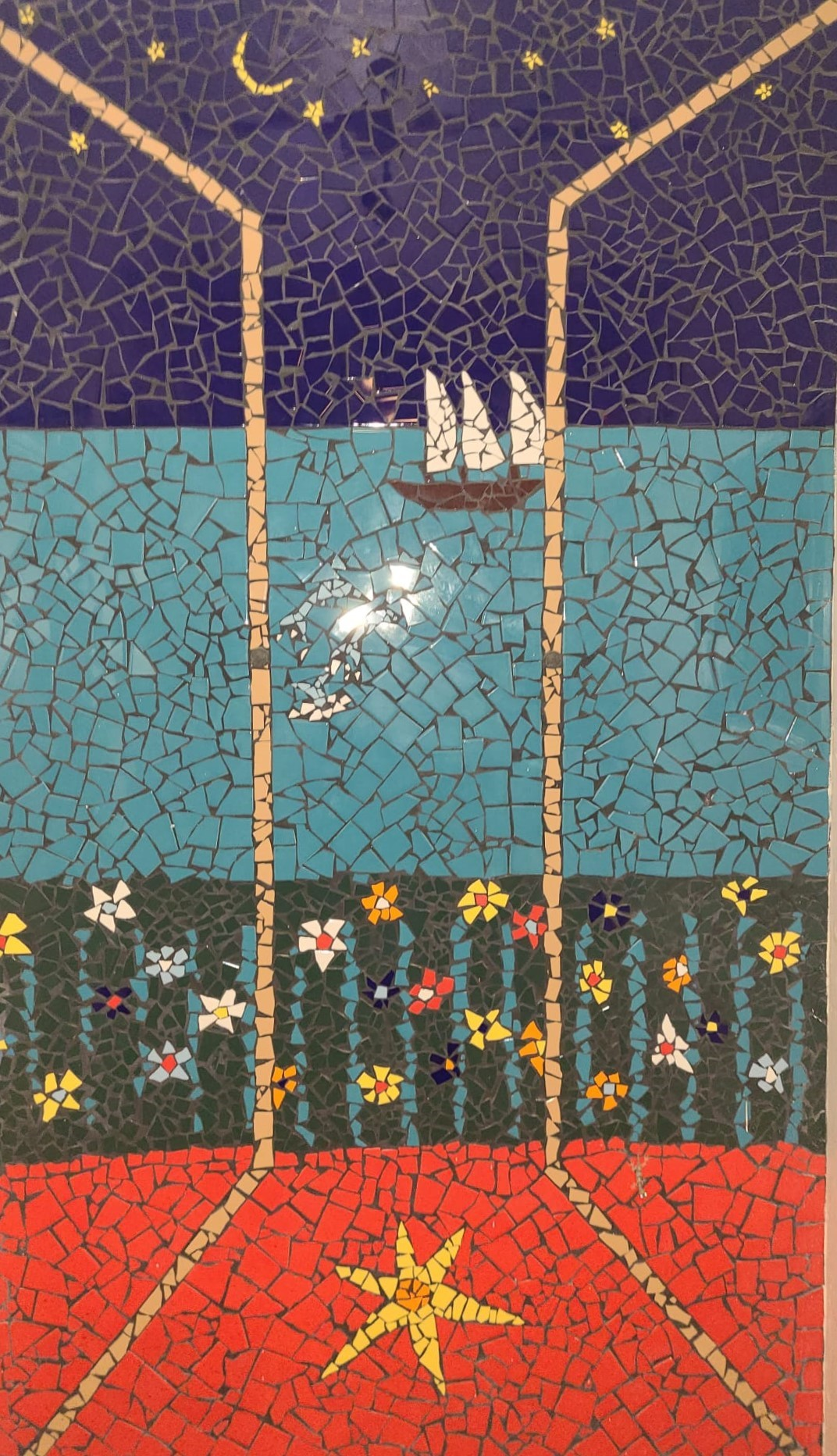
Window on the ocean

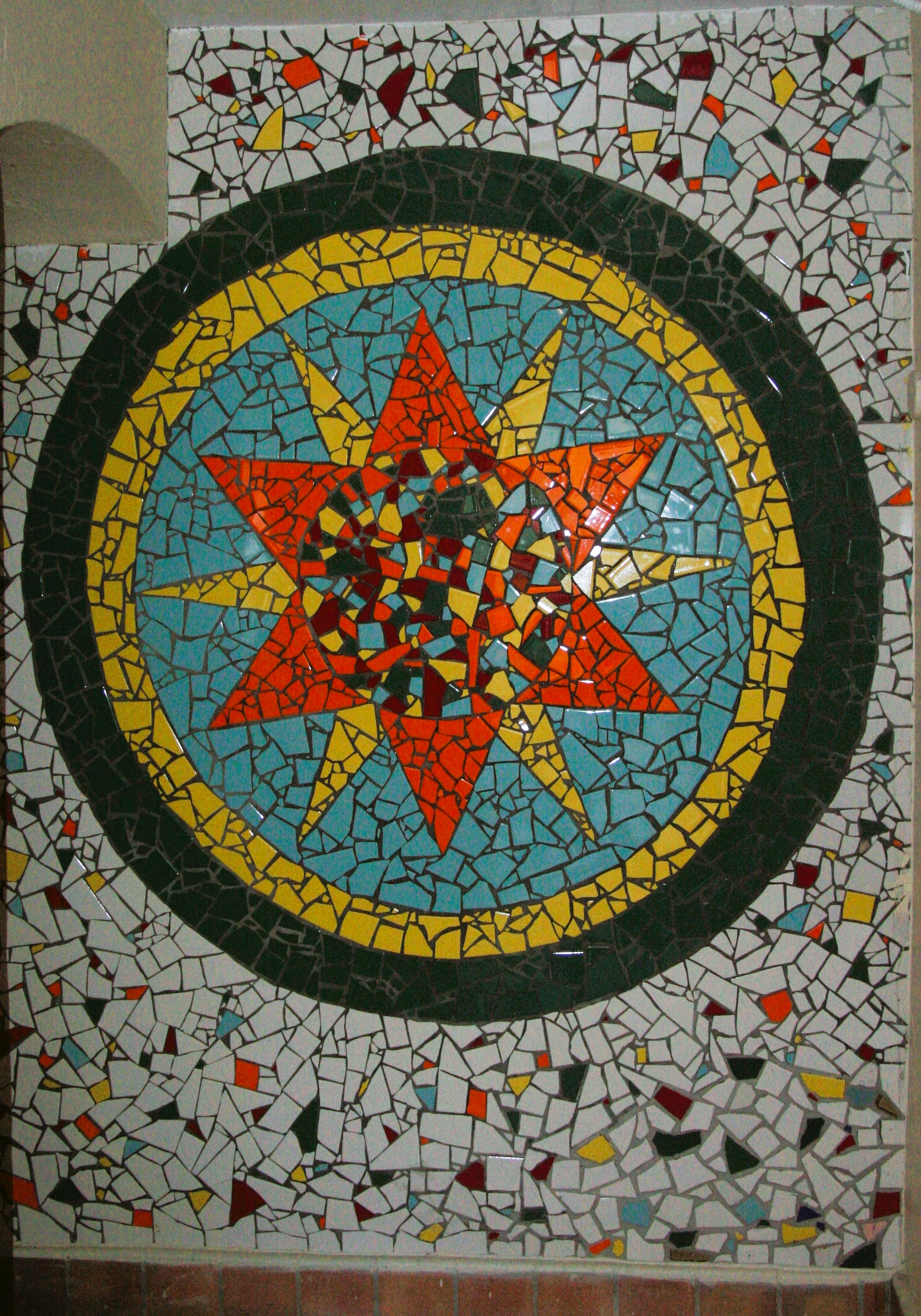
Wind cross

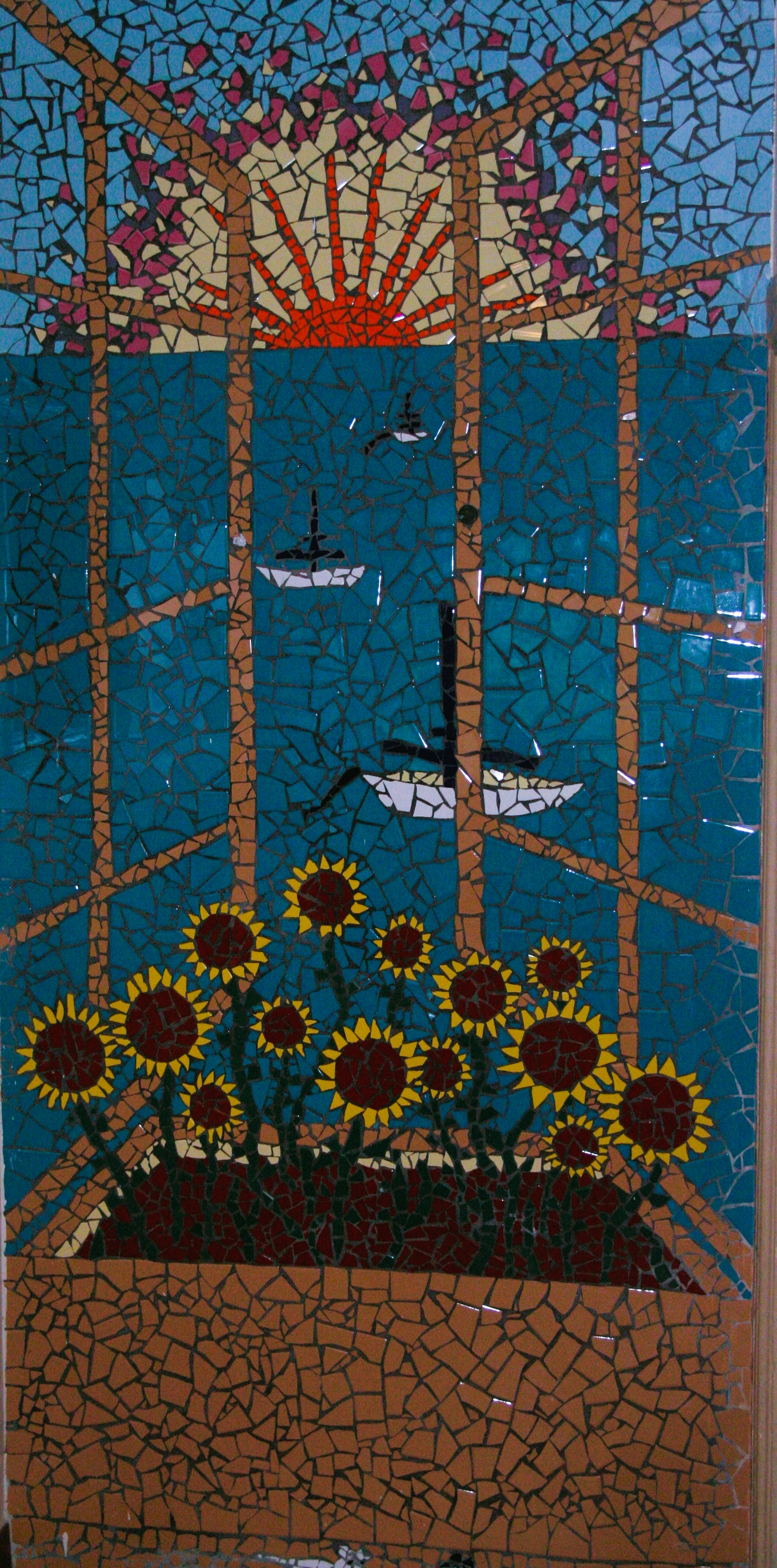
Sun flowers

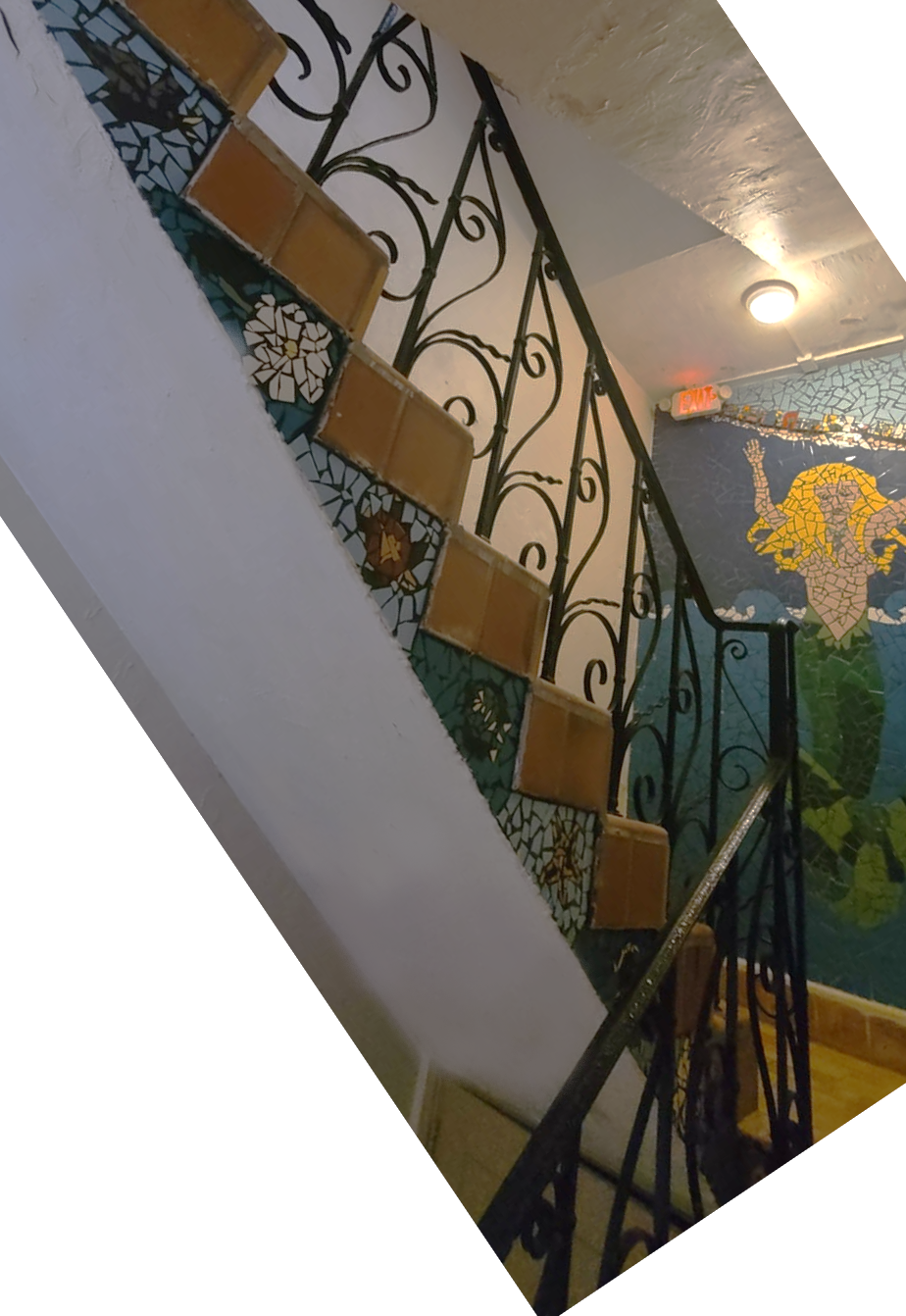
The mosaics also decorate the staircase leading to the higher floors, in the background the hand forged railings.
