= WKVS =

- Lenoir, North Carolina; United States
- Broadcast area: Lenoir, Hickory, Morganton, Taylorsville
- Frequency: 103.3 MHz

Programming
- Format: Country music

Ownership
- Owner: Foothills Radio Group, LLC
- Sister stations: WKGX, WJRI

Technical information
- Licensing authority: FCC
- Facility ID: 22015
- Class: A
- ERP: 910 watts
- HAAT: 257 meters
- Transmitter coordinates: 35°58′30″N 81°33′07″W

Links
- Public license information: Public file; LMS
- Website: gofoothills.com

WKVS (103.3 FM) is a radio station licensed to Lenoir, North Carolina, United States. The station is currently owned by Foothills Radio Group, LLC. The station currently carries local live programming with “Big Daddy” Dave Williams in the morning, "Middays with Wild Bill" and "The Drive Home with Kris Carson"and “Nights with Elaina.”

WKVS is also the home of the popular Saturday morning sports talk show "The Scoreboard" with David Jones, Jeff Link and Justin Carlton. WKVS broadcasts high school football games mainly in Caldwell, Burke and Catawba Counties.

Other weekend shows include America Outdoors Radio, Sunday’s Kind of Country, American Country Countdown with Kix Brooks, Retro Country and Knee Deep In Bluegrass.
