= Leonard Bolick =

American Lutheran bishop

The Reverend Doctor Leonard H. Bolick
- North Carolina Synod of the Evangelical Lutheran Church in America
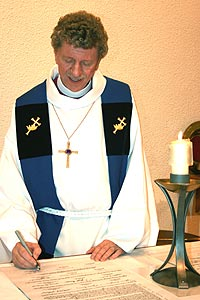
- Bishop Bolick signing an agreement with the Roman Catholic Church of North Carolina
- Diocese: North Carolina Evangelical Lutheran Synod
- See: Ninth Region of the ELCA
- Installed: February 2, 1997
- Term ended: September 12, 2015
- Predecessor: Michael C. D. McDaniel
- Successor: Timothy Smith

Personal details
- Born: Lenoir, North Carolina, U.S.
- Denomination: Lutheran
- Residence: Salisbury, North Carolina, U.S.
- Spouse: Rita Bolick
- Children: Joseph Bolick, Sarah Bolick
- Education: Appalachian State University

Styles of Leonard H. Bolick
- Reference style: The Reverend Doctor
- Spoken style: Bishop
- Religious style: Bishop
- Posthumous style: not applicable

Leonard H. Bolick is a prelate of the Evangelical Lutheran Church in America who served as the bishop of the North Carolina Evangelical Lutheran Synod from 1997 to 2015. Bolick is known for seeking ecumenical reconciliation and improving relations with the Roman Catholic Church in North Carolina while he has been bishop. Prior to serving as Bishop of North Carolina, Bolick served as a pastor at Calvary Evangelical Lutheran Church in Concord, North Carolina and St. James Evangelical Lutheran Church in Fayetteville, North Carolina.

He later joined the Bishop of North Carolina's personal staff and served in youth ministry and evangelism, and was a member of the Synod's transition team. He was consecrated as Bishop of the North Carolina Synod on February 2, 1997. He was succeeded in this position by Timothy Smith, who was officially installed as bishop of the North Carolina Synod on September 12, 2015.

Bolick received a bachelor's degree in history from Appalachian State University and a master of Divinity from the Lutheran Theological Southern Seminary. He also holds a doctorate in ministry from McCormick Theological Seminary and a doctorate in ministry from the Graduate Theological Foundation, as well as a doctorate of divinity from Lenoir–Rhyne University. He is married to Rita Bolick and is the father of two children, Joseph and Sarah Bolick.
