= Lenoir Grammar School =

Historic school building in North Carolina, United States

- U.S. National Register of Historic Places
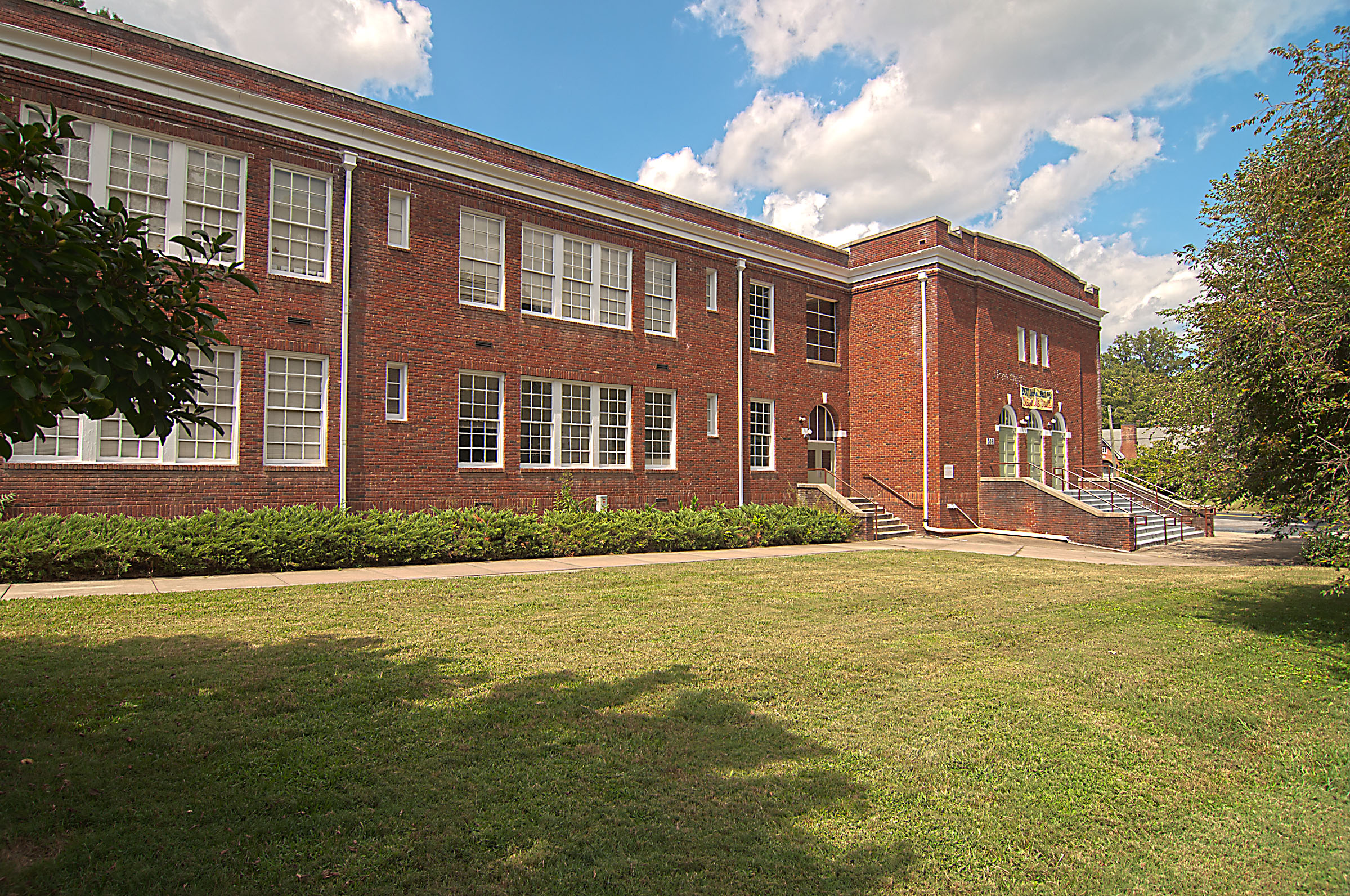

- Location within North Carolina Location within the United States
- Location: 506 Harper Av. NW Lenoir, North Carolina
- Coordinates: 35°54′59″N 81°32′9″W
- Area: 5.6 acres (2.3 ha)
- Built: 1927, 1951-1952, 1958
- Architect: Asbury, Louis
- Architectural style: Classical Revival
- NRHP reference No.: 06000290
- Added to NRHP: April 19, 2006

Lenoir Grammar School, also known as East Harper School, is a historic elementary school building located at Lenoir, Caldwell County, North Carolina. It was built in 1927, and is a two-story, five-bay, Classical Revival-style brick school. Additions were made in 1951-1952 and 1958. The school was closed after a fire in 1987, and renovated into apartments in the 1990s.

The house was listed on the National Register of Historic Places in 2006.
