= WKGX =

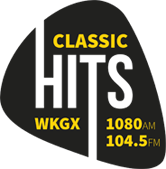
- Lenoir, North Carolina; United States
- Frequency: 1080 kHz
- Branding: Classic Hits 1080 AM, 104.5 FM & 99.5 FM

Programming
- Format: Classic hits

Ownership
- Owner: Foothills Radio Group; (Foothills Radio Group, LLC)
- Sister stations: WJRI, WKVS

Technical information
- Licensing authority: FCC
- Facility ID: 22915
- Class: D
- Power: 5,000 watts day 2,500 watts critical hours
- Transmitter coordinates: 35°54′38″N 81°33′35″W
- Translators: 99.5 W258CS (Lenoir); 104.5 W283CE (Lenoir)

Links
- Public license information: Public file; LMS
- Website: www.gofoothills.com

WKGX (1080 AM) is a radio station licensed to Lenoir, North Carolina, United States. It broadcasts a classic hits format and is licensed to Foothills Radio Group, LLC. The station is also heard via FM translators W258CS (99.5 MHz) and W283CE (104.5 MHz).
