= Lenoir, North Carolina =

- City
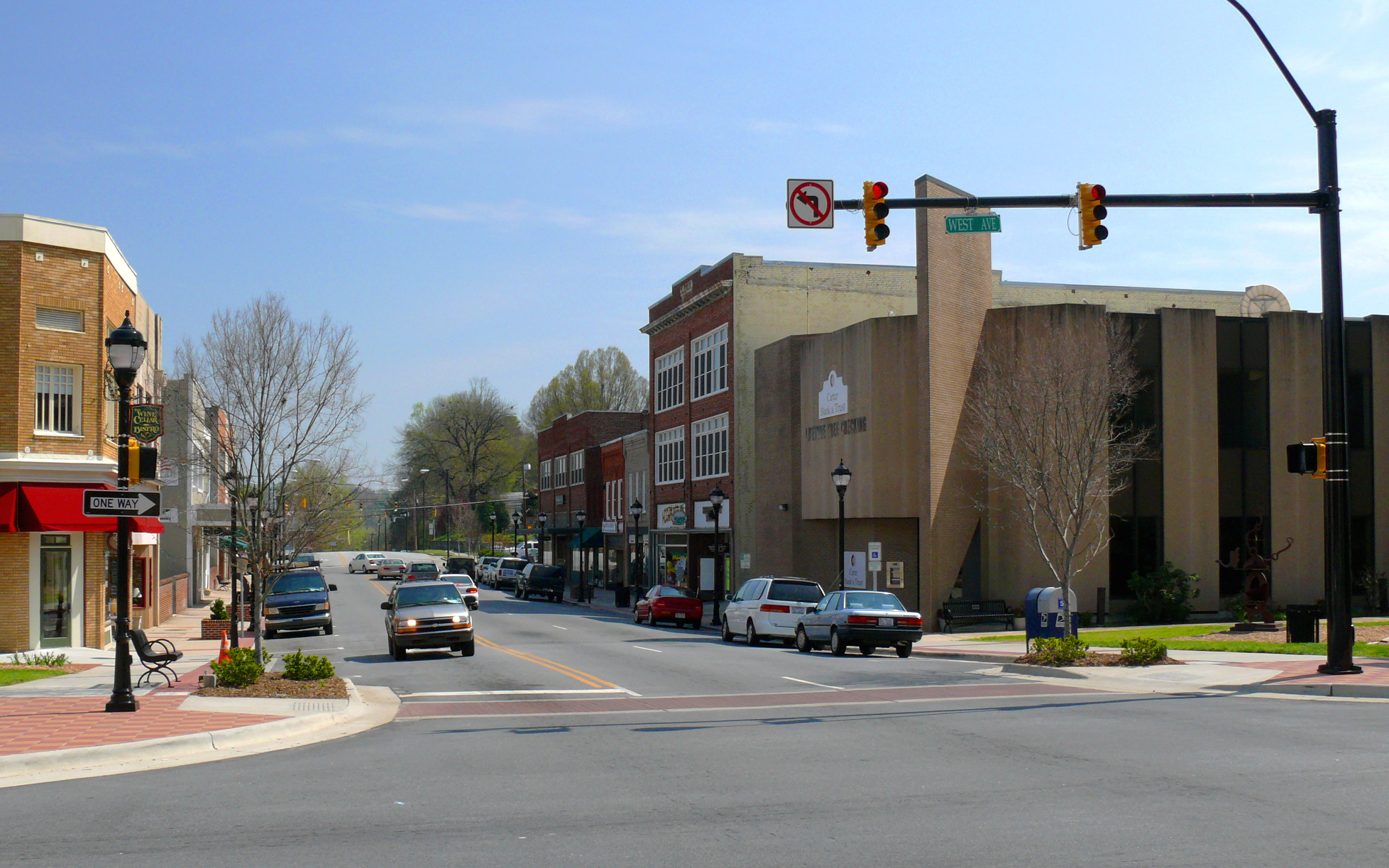
- Main Street in Downtown Lenoir

- Flag Seal
- Motto: "Where the High Country Begins"
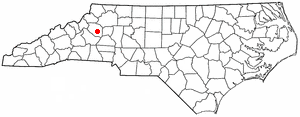
- Location within the state of North Carolina
- Coordinates: 35°54′34″N 81°31′29″W
- Country: United States
- State: North Carolina
- County: Caldwell
- Named for: William Lenoir

Government
  - Type: Council-Manager
  - Mayor: Joseph L. Gibbons (Independent)
  - Mayor Pro Tem: Crissy Thomas
  - Governing body: Lenoir City Council

Area
  - Total: 20.83 sq mi (53.95 km^{2})
  - Land: 20.83 sq mi (53.94 km^{2})
  - Water: 0.0077 sq mi (0.02 km^{2})
- Elevation: 1,129 ft (344 m)

Population (2020)
  - Total: 18,352
  - Density: 881.2/sq mi (340.25/km^{2})
- Time zone: UTC−5 (Eastern (EST))
  - Summer (DST): UTC−4 (EDT)
- ZIP Codes: 28633, 28645
- Area code: 828
- FIPS code: 37-37760
- GNIS feature ID: 2404911
- Website: www.cityoflenoir.com

Lenoir (/lɛˈnɔːr/ le-NOR) is a city in and the county seat of Caldwell County, North Carolina, United States. The population was 18,263 at the 2020 census. Lenoir is located in the foothills of the Blue Ridge Mountains. To the northeast are the Brushy Mountains, a spur of the Blue Ridge Mountains. Hibriten Mountain, located just east of the city limits, marks the western end of the Brushy Mountains range.

Lenoir is one of the principal cities in the Hickory-Lenoir-Morganton, NC Metropolitan Statistical Area.

== History ==
Lenoir was established in 1841 and incorporated in 1851. The city was named for Revolutionary War general and early North Carolina statesman William Lenoir, who settled north of present-day Lenoir. His restored home, Fort Defiance, is a tourist attraction.

=== Early history ===
The original settlement of Lenoir was known as Tucker's Barn, after a Tucker family that settled on the north side of Lower Creek around 1765. The homestead eventually served as a voting precinct, a muster ground, a store, and a place for celebrations. When Caldwell County was formed in 1841, a commission was appointed to choose a location for the county seat. One member proposed the south side of Lower Creek (today, the Whitnel area) because of its view of the Blue Ridge Mountains. However, since most of the county's population was on the north side of Lower Creek, the Tucker's Barn site was chosen, where Lenoir is today.

=== American Civil War ===
During Gen. Stonemans final raid in 1865 during the American Civil War, he passed through Lenoir on March 28 and again on April 15. On March 29, 1865, a small skirmish took place near Lenoir.

Along with this; multiple Civil War companies were formed with soldiers from Lenoir and Caldwell County. These companies served in various different regiments within the Confederate States Army. There were also Southern Unionists who supported the Union within Caldwell County, with local Confederate deserters and resisters joining with them as the war went on.

Following the Civil War, Clinton A. Cilley, a Union Army Medal of Honor recipient, would settle in Lenoir. He worked as a lawyer, eventually becoming a civic leader, judge, and elected as Mayor of Lenoir.

=== National Register of Historic Places locations ===
In addition to Fort Defiance, the Caldwell County Courthouse, Lenoir Downtown Historic District, Lenoir Grammar School, Lenoir High School, Mary's Grove, and Edgar Allan Poe House are listed on the National Register of Historic Places.

== Geography ==
Lenoir is southeast of the center of Caldwell County, and is bordered to the south by the towns of Hudson and Cajah's Mountain, and to the southwest by the town of Gamewell.

The city is at the intersection of U.S. Highways 64 and 321. US 64 leads east 42 miles (68 km) to Statesville and southwest 15 miles (24 km) to Morganton, while US 321 leads north 27 miles (43 km) to Boone and southeast 17 miles (27 km) to Hickory.

According to the United States Census Bureau, Lenoir has a total area of 19.7 square miles (50.9 km^{2}), all land. The city is in the valley of Lower Creek, between the Brushy Mountains to the east and the Blue Ridge Mountains to the west. Lower Creek flows southwest to the Catawba River valley.

=== Climate ===
Lenoir has a humid subtropical climate (Köppen climate classification Cfa), with cool to mild winters and warm, humid summers. Due to the city's proximity to the Blue Ridge Mountains, temperatures tend to be slightly cooler than areas to the east.

Climate data for Lenoir, North Carolina (1991–2020 normals, extremes 1900-present) (Note: Mean monthly maxima and minima (i.e. the expected highest and lowest temperature readings at any point during the year or given month) calculated based on data at said location from 1991 to 2020.)
Month	Jan	Feb	Mar	Apr	May	Jun	Jul	Aug	Sep	Oct	Nov	Dec	Year
Record high °F (°C)	80 (27)	83 (28)	93 (34)	95 (35)	98 (37)	102 (39)	106 (41)	105 (41)	101 (38)	96 (36)	88 (31)	80 (27)	106 (41)
Mean daily maximum °F (°C)	49.1 (9.5)	52.9 (11.6)	60.2 (15.7)	70.1 (21.2)	77.4 (25.2)	84.3 (29.1)	87.5 (30.8)	86.0 (30.0)	80.4 (26.9)	71.1 (21.7)	60.9 (16.1)	52.1 (11.2)	69.3 (20.8)
Daily mean °F (°C)	38.2 (3.4)	41.3 (5.2)	48.2 (9.0)	57.5 (14.2)	65.6 (18.7)	73.5 (23.1)	77.1 (25.1)	75.7 (24.3)	69.6 (20.9)	58.7 (14.8)	48.3 (9.1)	40.8 (4.9)	57.9 (14.4)
Mean daily minimum °F (°C)	27.3 (−2.6)	29.7 (−1.3)	36.2 (2.3)	45.0 (7.2)	53.9 (12.2)	62.7 (17.1)	66.7 (19.3)	65.4 (18.6)	58.9 (14.9)	46.3 (7.9)	35.7 (2.1)	29.6 (−1.3)	46.4 (8.0)
Record low °F (°C)	−7 (−22)	−2 (−19)	5 (−15)	17 (−8)	29 (−2)	37 (3)	46 (8)	41 (5)	32 (0)	19 (−7)	8 (−13)	−18 (−28)	−18 (−28)
Average rainfall inches (mm)	3.93 (100)	3.33 (85)	4.29 (109)	4.44 (113)	4.38 (111)	4.73 (120)	4.60 (117)	4.48 (114)	4.25 (108)	3.63 (92)	3.33 (85)	4.27 (108)	49.66 (1,262)
Average snowfall inches (cm)	1.3 (3.3)	0.2 (0.51)	0.3 (0.76)	0 (0)	0 (0)	0 (0)	0 (0)	0 (0)	0 (0)	0 (0)	0 (0)	2.3 (5.8)	4.1 (10.37)
Source: NOAA

== Demographics ==
Historical population
Census	Pop.	Note	%±
1870	446		—
1880	422		−5.4%
1890	673		59.5%
1900	1,296		92.6%
1910	3,364		159.6%
1920	3,718		10.5%
1930	6,532		75.7%
1940	7,598		16.3%
1950	7,888		3.8%
1960	10,257		30.0%
1970	14,705		43.4%
1980	13,748		−6.5%
1990	14,192		3.2%
2000	16,793		18.3%
2010	18,228		8.5%
2020	18,352		0.7%
2025 (est.)	18,372	▲	0.1%
U.S. Decennial Census

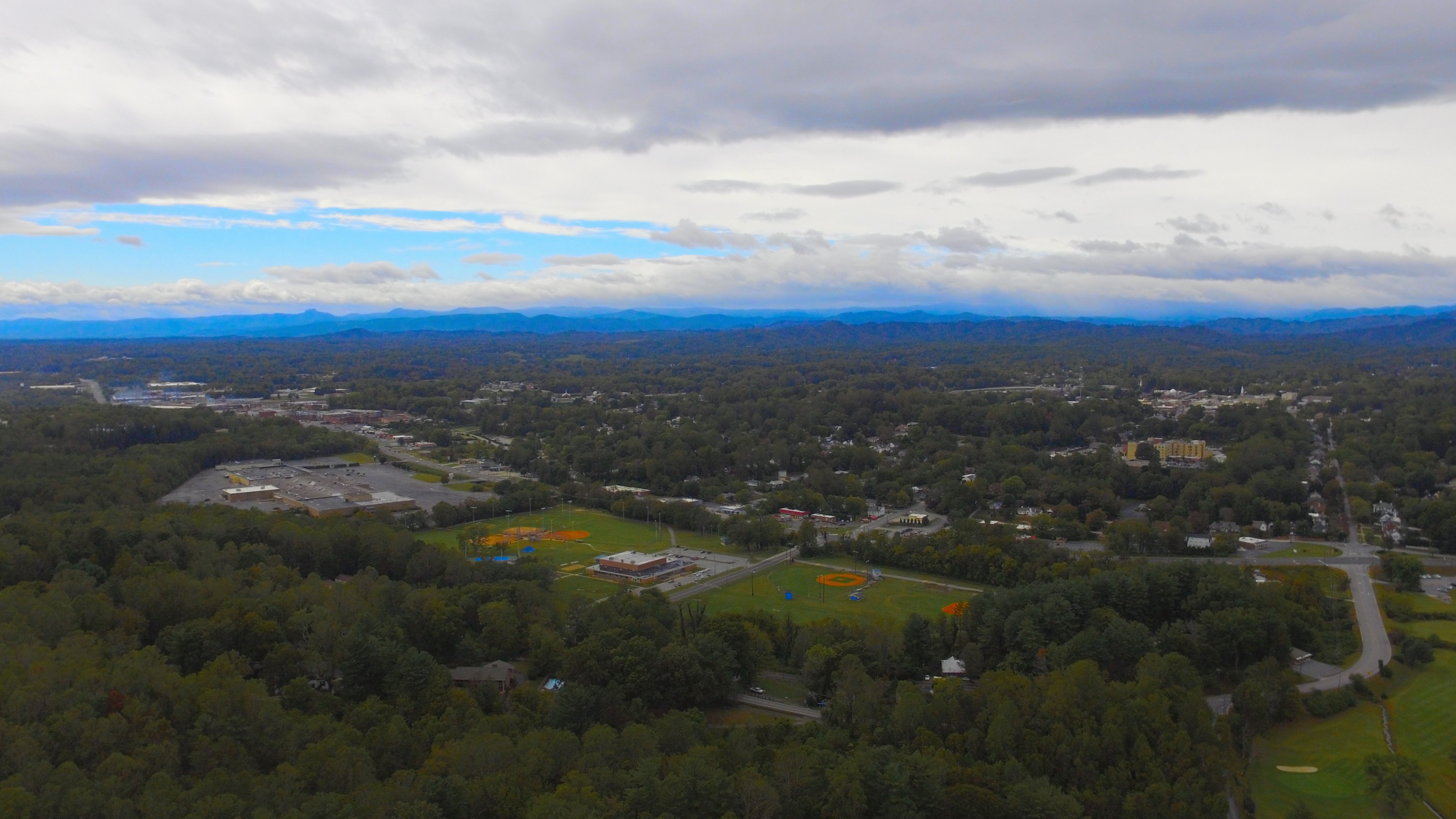
View of Lenoir from Hibriten Mountain

=== 2020 census ===
Racial composition as of the 2020 census
Race	Number	Percentage
White	13,493	73.5%
Black or African American	2,141	11.7%
American Indian and Alaska Native	91	0.5%
Asian	183	1.0%
Pacific Islander	7	0.0%
Some other race	1,148	6.3%
Two or more races	1,289	7.0%
Hispanic or Latino (of any race)	2,058	11.2%

As of the 2020 census, Lenoir had a population of 18,352. The median age was 42.0 years. 21.9% of residents were under the age of 18 and 20.3% of residents were 65 years of age or older. For every 100 females there were 90.8 males, and for every 100 females age 18 and over there were 89.2 males age 18 and over.

99.0% of residents lived in urban areas, while 1.0% lived in rural areas.

There were 7,600 households in Lenoir, of which 4,539 were families; 28.6% had children under the age of 18 living in them. Of all households, 37.7% were married-couple households, 20.2% were households with a male householder and no spouse or partner present, and 35.0% were households with a female householder and no spouse or partner present. About 34.2% of all households were made up of individuals and 16.8% had someone living alone who was 65 years of age or older.

There were 8,401 housing units, of which 9.5% were vacant. The homeowner vacancy rate was 1.9% and the rental vacancy rate was 6.4%.

=== 2000 census ===
As of the census of 2000, there were 16,793 people, 6,913 households, and 4,569 families residing in the city. The population density was 1,013.7 inhabitants per square mile (391.4/km^{2}). There were 7,461 housing units at an average density of 450.4 per square mile (173.9/km^{2}). The racial makeup of the city was 80.88% White, 14.71% African American, 0.23% Native American, 0.67% Asian, 0.11% Pacific Islander, 2.27% from other races, and 1.13% from two or more races. Hispanic or Latino people of any race were 4.25% of the population.

There were 6,913 households, out of which 27.4% had children under the age of 18 living with them, 47.0% were married couples living together, 14.8% had a female householder with no husband present, and 33.9% were non-families. 29.7% of all households were made up of individuals, and 13.1% had someone living alone who was 65 years of age or older. The average household size was 2.34 and the average family size was 2.87.

In the city, the population was spread out, with 22.9% under the age of 18, 8.1% from 18 to 24, 27.5% from 25 to 44, 23.3% from 45 to 64, and 18.3% who were 65 years of age or older. The median age was 39 years. For every 100 females, there were 91.1 males. For every 100 females age 18 and over, there were 88.2 males.

The median income for a household in the city was $29,369, and the median income for a family was $37,280. Males had a median income of $26,122 versus $21,895 for females. The per capita income for the city was $16,697. About 10.4% of families and 14.3% of the population were below the poverty line, including 20.4% of those under age 18 and 12.7% of those age 65 or over.

== Economy ==
The Broyhill Furniture company, one of the largest furniture companies in the United States and part of Heritage Home Group (KPS Capital Partners), recently closed its headquarters in Lenoir. Furniture in general has historically been one of the city's largest employers. The Bernhardt, Kincaid, and Fairfield furniture companies are based in or around Lenoir. In the 1990s, these companies began changing their business models to reflect consumer trends, and closed several of Lenoir's furniture factories. Recent consolidations of area furniture facilities (Thomasville, Taylorsville, North Wilkesboro, etc.) have netted modest gains in positions in the industry around Lenoir. The medical and education sectors are now the area's largest employers.

Google, Inc. has a server farm, or "data center", in Lenoir. There was controversy over the nature, amount, and potential benefits of economic development incentives that the City of Lenoir, Caldwell County, and the State of North Carolina gave Google in 2007 to induce the company to build the server farm. The less celebrated benefits of the investment have been construction employment and spending, a small-time server farm investment just outside downtown, Dacentec, as well as local charitable and educational endeavors by Google.

Wholesale nurseries, shipping large balled and burlap plants to landscapers in metropolitan areas, have been a strong source of employment in Lenoir over the last 75 years. Local nurseries employ around two percent of the local population.

== Parks and recreation ==
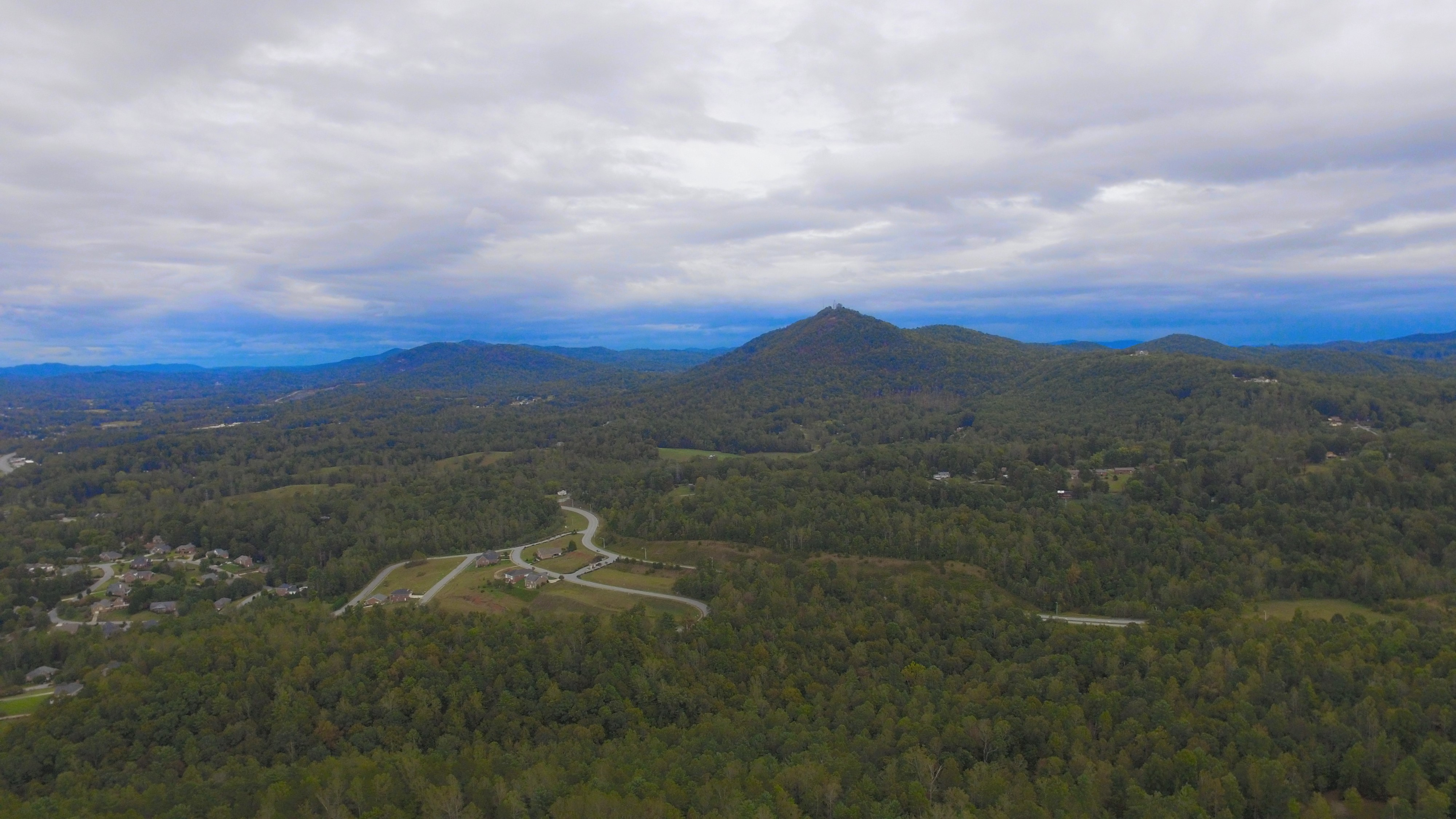
Hibriten Mountain

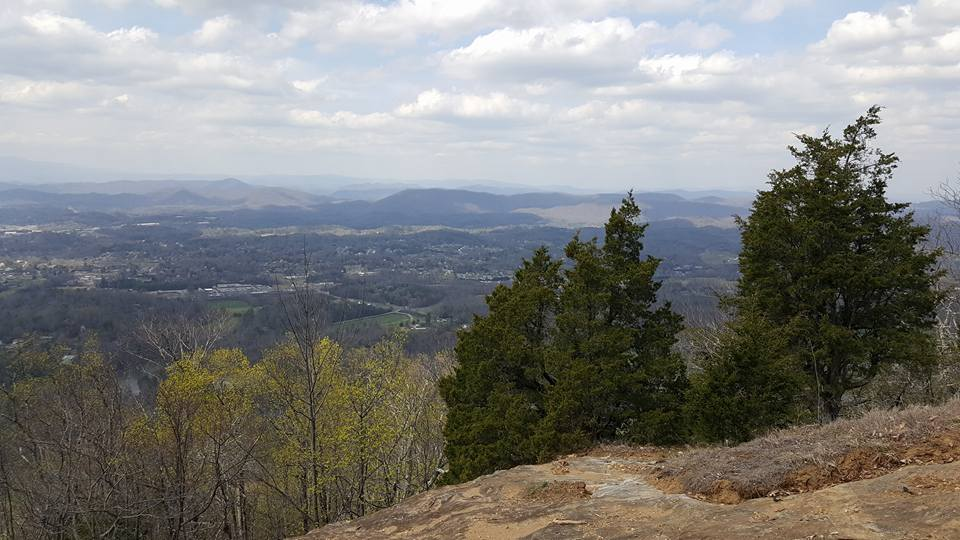
Top of Hibriten Mountain

- 5.3 mile Greenway system
- Mack Cook Stadium
- Mulberry Recreation Center
- T. Henry Wilson Athletic Park
- T.H. Broyhill Walking Park
- Lenoir Rotary Soccer Complex
- J.E. Broyhill Park
- Martin Luther King Center
- Zack's Fork Mountain Bike Trail

=== Teams ===
- Lenoir Youth Soccer Association / Lenoir Force (LYSA Force), a travel soccer team in Lenoir
- Caldwell County Youth Football League
- Post 29 Youth Baseball
- Carolina Express Basketball

=== Recreation ===
- The Lenoir Aquatic and Fitness Center is open to the public and features an Olympic size swimming pool, indoor junior size swimming pool, water slides, racquetball courts, exercise equipment, a steam and weight room, locker rooms, covered shelters, and a walking and mountain bike training system.
- The 18-hole Lenoir Golf Club in Lenoir features 6,385 yards of golf, with a course rating of 71.3 and a slope rating of 125, on Bermuda grass. The course opened with nine holes in 1928, was redesigned by Donald Ross in 1945, and was expanded to 18 holes in 1961.

=== Hiking ===
- Nearby Hibriten Mountain has a 5.4 mi (8.7 km) hiking trail, climbing 740 ft (230 m) on a gated-gravel road.

== Education ==
=== High schools ===
- Caldwell Applied Sciences Academy
- Caldwell Early College High School
- Hibriten High School
- South Caldwell High School
- West Caldwell High School

=== Middle schools ===
- Gamewell Middle School
- William Lenoir

=== K–8 schools ===
- Happy Valley School
- Kings Creek School
- Oak Hill Charter School

=== Elementary schools ===
- Davenport A+ School
- Gamewell Elementary School
- Lower Creek Elementary School
- Valmead Elementary School
- West Lenoir Elementary School
- Whitnel Elementary School

=== Alternative schools ===
- Horizons Elementary
- Gateway School

=== College ===
- Caldwell Community College and Technical Institute

== Media ==
- WKVS, Kicks 103.3 FM, local country music radio station
- WJRI, Star 94.7 FM, 100.5 FM & 1340 AM, local adult hits radio station
- WKGX, 104.5 FM, 99.5 FM & AM 1080, local classic hits radio station
- W218BW, FM 91.5, translator for WETS, East Tennessee State University radio station
- News-Topic, local newspaper in Lenoir and Caldwell counties
- The Presbyterian Layman, a publication of the Presbyterian Lay Committee independent of the denomination, is published in Lenoir.

== Infrastructure ==
=== Highways ===
- US 321
- US 321A
- US 64
- NC 18
- NC 90
- NC 268

== Notable people ==
- Johnny Allen, MLB pitcher, World Series Champion with the New York Yankees in 1932 and All-Star selection in 1938
- Claude Baker, composer
- Grant Barnette, ultramarathon runner
- Leonard Bolick, bishop of the ELCA North Carolina Synod
- Jim Broyhill, former United States congressman for North Carolina from 1962 to 1986, U.S. senator from July 1986 to November 1986
- Ervin M. Bruner, former Wisconsin state assemblyman
- Madison Bumgarner, MLB pitcher, four-time All-Star selection, three-time World Series champion and 2014 World Series MVP with the San Francisco Giants
- Clinton A. Cilley, military officer, lawyer, judge, and politician
- Linda Combs, former U.S. government official
- Charlie Cozart, MLB pitcher for the Boston Braves
- Lindsay Deal, MLB outfielder for the Brooklyn Dodgers
- Nick Easton, former NFL offensive lineman
- Bob Gibbons, high school basketball sports scout
- Destin Hall, member of the North Carolina House of Representatives, representing the 87th district
- Jan Karon, New York Times-bestselling author of the Mitford Series and the Father Tim novels
- William Lenoir, Revolutionary War general and namesake of Lenoir
- Harry Martin, former North Carolina Supreme Court justice
- Bob McCreary, former NFL player and entrepreneur
- Kary Banks Mullis, biochemist and Nobel laureate; inventor of the polymerase chain reaction
- William C. Newland, served as 11th Lieutenant Governor of North Carolina, town of Newland, North Carolina, named after him
- James Pritchett, actor who played the central character of Dr. Matt Powers on The Doctors soap opera for its entire 1963 to 1982 run
- Joseph Robinson, former principle oboist with the New York Philharmonic
- Larry Smith, former NASCAR driver
- Carl Story, influential bluegrass musician
- Magruder Tuttle, rear admiral in the U.S. Navy
- Rube Walker, MLB catcher, two-time World Series Champion with the Brooklyn/Los Angeles Dodgers
- Verlon Walker, former MLB coach
- Stephanie Powell Watts, author
- Louis Round Wilson, university librarian and first director of the library school at the University of North Carolina at Chapel Hill, 1901–1932
- John G. Witherspoon, captain in the United States Coast Guard
- George Younce, southern gospel vocalist, known for singing bass with The Cathedrals

== Accolades ==
Lenoir was one of the recipients of the 2008 All-America City Award.
