= Bob Gibbons =

American talent scout

Bob Gibbons (born July 20, 1939) is an American talent scout, specializing in high school basketball players. He is based in Lenoir, North Carolina.

Gibbons founded All-Star Sports in 1974. Before that, he was a high school player and coach. He is one of those who is credited with transforming scouting of school-age basketball stars into an industry.

Gibbons publishes an annual ranking of the top 150 high school players in the U.S., as well as separate rankings of seniors, juniors, sophomores, and freshmen. He has also been on committees that select players for the annual McDonald's High School All-American Game and the Nike Hoop Summit.
