= Magruder Tuttle =

American rear admiral (1908–1998)

Navy Midshipmen
- Position: Center

Personal information
- Born: July 21, 1908; Lenoir, North Carolina, U.S.
- Died: November 6, 1998 (aged 90); Pensacola, Florida, U.S.

Career information
- College: U.S. Naval Academy (1930–1931)

Awards and highlights
- 1st team All-Time Navy football (1932 edition)

Magruder Hill Tuttle (July 21, 1908 – November 6, 1998) was an American rear admiral. Born and raised in Lenoir, North Carolina, Tuttle attended Duke University before entering the United States Naval Academy, from which he graduated in 1932. While at the academy, Tuttle played center on the football team for two years and was team captain in 1931. For his accomplishments in football at the academy, the New York Sun named him as the first-team center on their all-time Navy football team, selected in 1932. Following graduation, Tuttle was commissioned as an officer in the United States Navy. He was a senior officer at the Pearl Harbor naval base when it was attacked on December 7, 1941. During World War II, he served as a pilot and commanded three different squadrons at various times throughout the war. Tuttle also served in the Korean War and the Vietnam War. Other assignments included commander of Corry Field, commander of the USS Philippine Sea, and deputy commander of the Pacific Missile Range. While stationed in Florida, Tuttle planned and founded the National Naval Aviation Museum. He died in Pensacola, Florida on November 6, 1998.
