= Lenoir Downtown Historic District =

Historic district in North Carolina, United States

- U.S. National Register of Historic Places
- U.S. Historic district
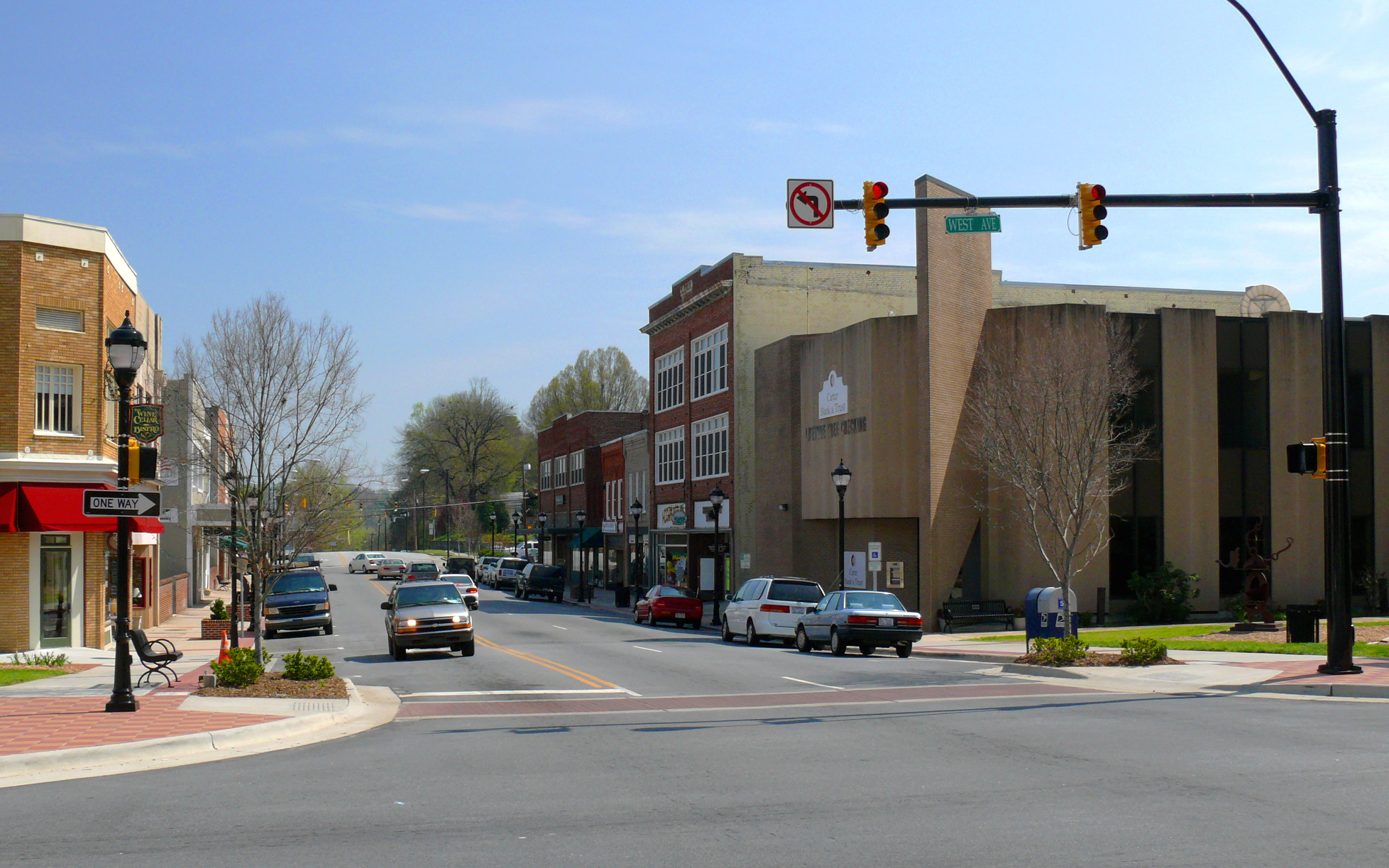
- Main Street, looking south

- Location within North Carolina Location within the United States
- Location: Roughly bounded by Ashe Ave., Mulberry St., Harper Ave., Church St., and Boundary St.; 915-1011 West Ave. & 122 Boundary St., Lenoir, North Carolina
- Coordinates: 35°54′56″N 81°32′23″W
- Area: 7.64 acres (3.09 ha)
- Architect: Martin L. Hampton, Hook and Rogers, Erle G. Stillwell
- Architectural style: Classical Revival, Tudor Revival, Art Deco, Art Moderne
- NRHP reference No.: 07000905, 13000246 (Boundary Increase)
- Added to NRHP: September 5, 2007, May 8, 2013 (Boundary Increase)

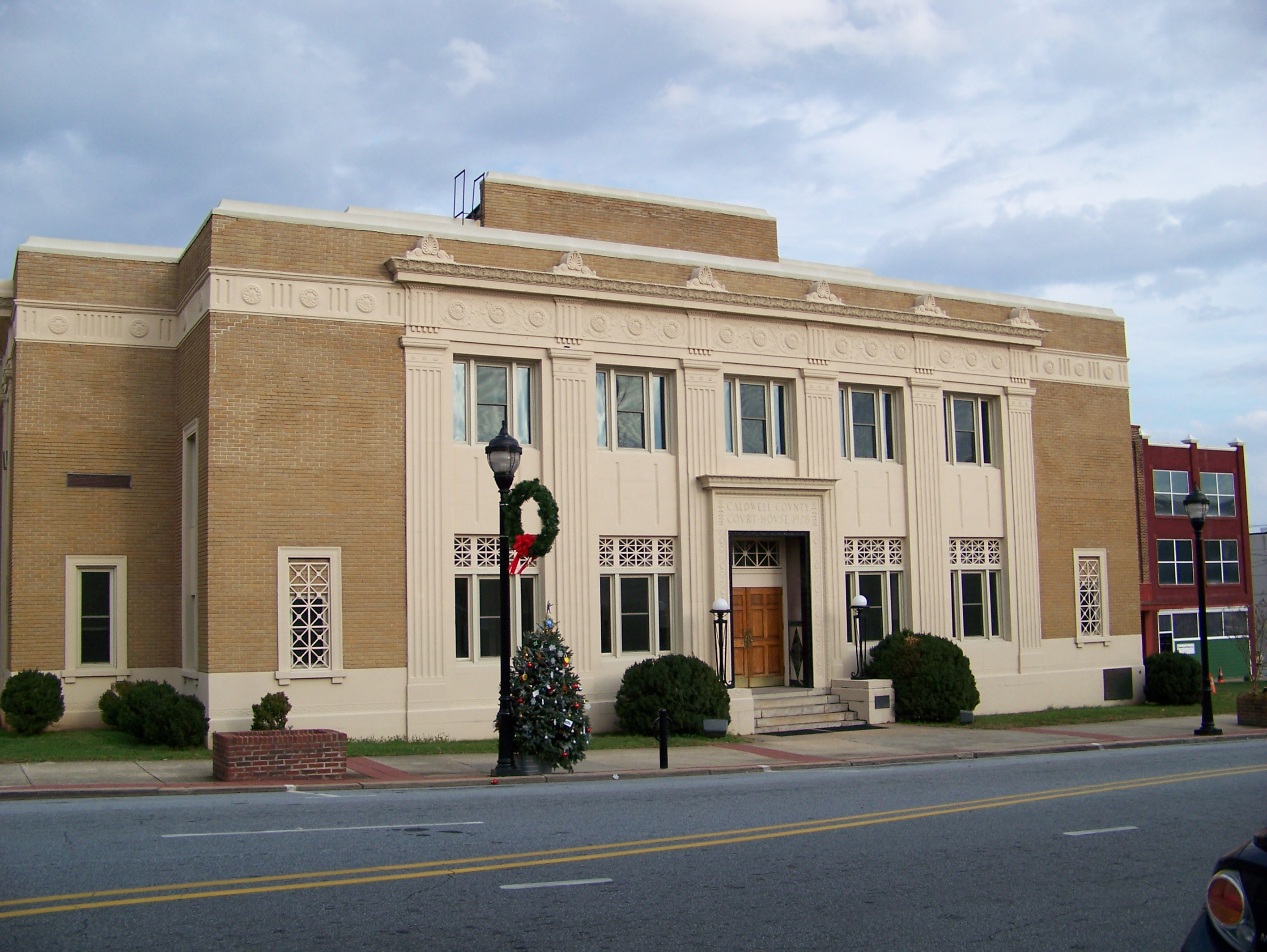
Caldwell County Courthouse, 2011

Lenoir Downtown Historic District is a national historic district located at Lenoir, Caldwell County, North Carolina. The district includes 41 contributing buildings and 2 contributing objects in the central business district of Lenoir. It includes commercial, governmental, and institutional buildings in a variety of popular architectural styles including Art Deco, Art Moderne, Classical Revival and Tudor Revival. Notable contributing resources include the Center Theater (1941), O. P. Lutz Furniture Company and Lutz Hosiery Mill (1939), Dayvault's Drug Store (1937), Caldwell County Agricultural Building (1937), Courtney Warehouse (c. 1888), Masonic Hall (1901, 1959), Miller Building (c. 1900, c. 1920s), Confederate Monument (1910), Belk's Department Store (1928), Lenoir Building (1907), J. C. Penney Department Store (1941, c. 1980s), Fidelity Building (1928), and U. S. Post Office (1931). Located in the district is the separately listed Caldwell County Courthouse.

The district was listed on the National Register of Historic Places in 2007, with a boundary increase in 2013.
