= Harry Martin (judge) =

American judge

Harry C. Martin
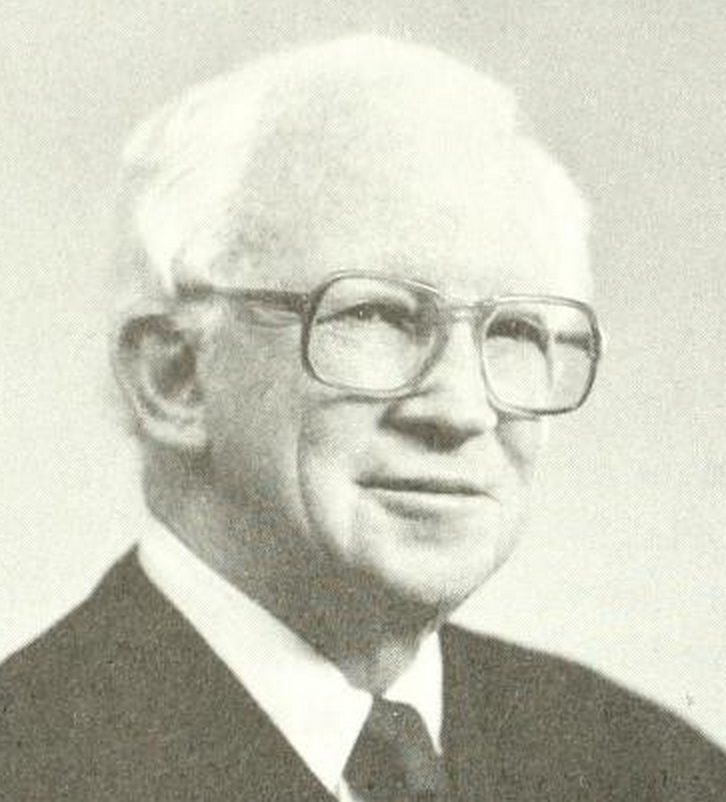

Associate Justice of the North Carolina Supreme Court
- In office 1982–1992

Personal details
- Born: Harry Corpening Martin; January 13, 1920 Lenoir, North Carolina, U.S.
- Died: May 3, 2015 (aged 95) Asheville, North Carolina, U.S.
- Spouse(s): Nancy Dallam (m.1955)

Harry Corpening Martin (January 13, 1920 – May 3, 2015) was an associate justice of the North Carolina Supreme Court, serving from 1982 to 1992. He was born in Lenoir, North Carolina.

He attended the University of North Carolina where he obtained a music degree. He then served in the United States Army Air Forces during World War II from 1942 to 1945. He received his law degree from Harvard University after the war in 1948 and entered into a private practice. He became a judge in 1962 on the Superior Court of North Carolina. He would be appointed to the North Carolina Court of Appeals in 1978 and Supreme Court in 1982, serving until his mandatory retirement due to age in 1992. He also served as chief justice of the Cherokee Supreme Court from 2000 to 2006.

Martin married Nancy Dallam in 1955. They raised three children and later retired in Asheville, North Carolina. Marin died on May 3, 2015, in Asheville, North Carolina.
