= Caldwell County Courthouse (North Carolina) =

- U.S. National Register of Historic Places
- U.S. Historic district – Contributing property
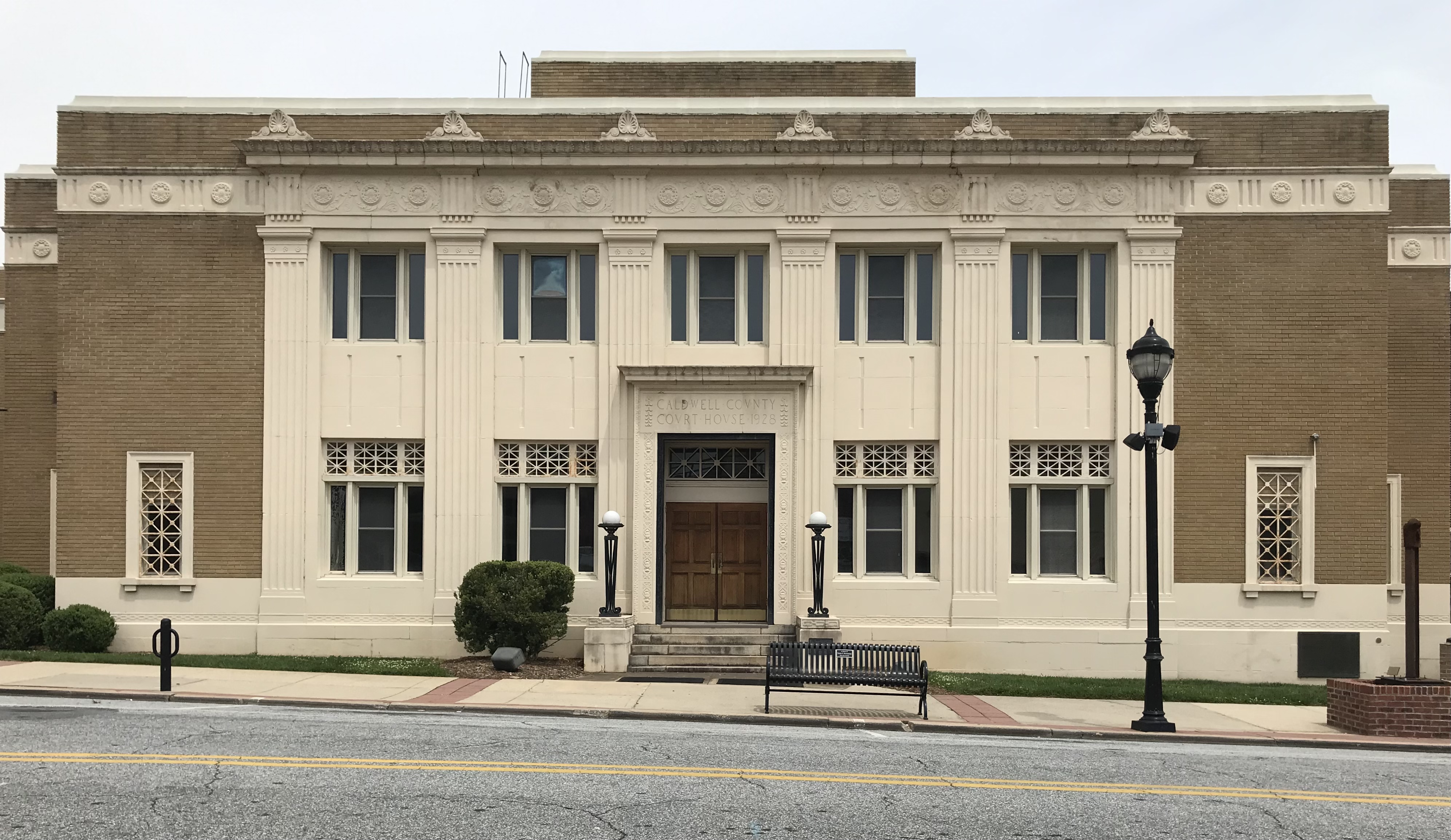
- Courthouse in 2023

- Location within North Carolina Location within the United States
- Location: 216 Main St NW, Lenoir, North Carolina
- Coordinates: 35°54′55″N 81°32′24″W
- Built: 1905
- Architect: Wheeler & Runge; Martin L. Hampton
- Architectural style: Classical Revival
- MPS: North Carolina County Courthouses TR
- NRHP reference No.: 79001687
- Added to NRHP: May 10, 1979

The Caldwell County Courthouse in Lenoir, North Carolina was designed by Wheeler & Runge in Classical Revival style. It was built in 1905.

It was listed on the National Register of Historic Places in 1979. The listing included one contributing building and two contributing objects. It is located in the Lenoir Downtown Historic District.
