= 1940 South Carolina hurricane =

Category 2 Atlantic hurricane in 1940

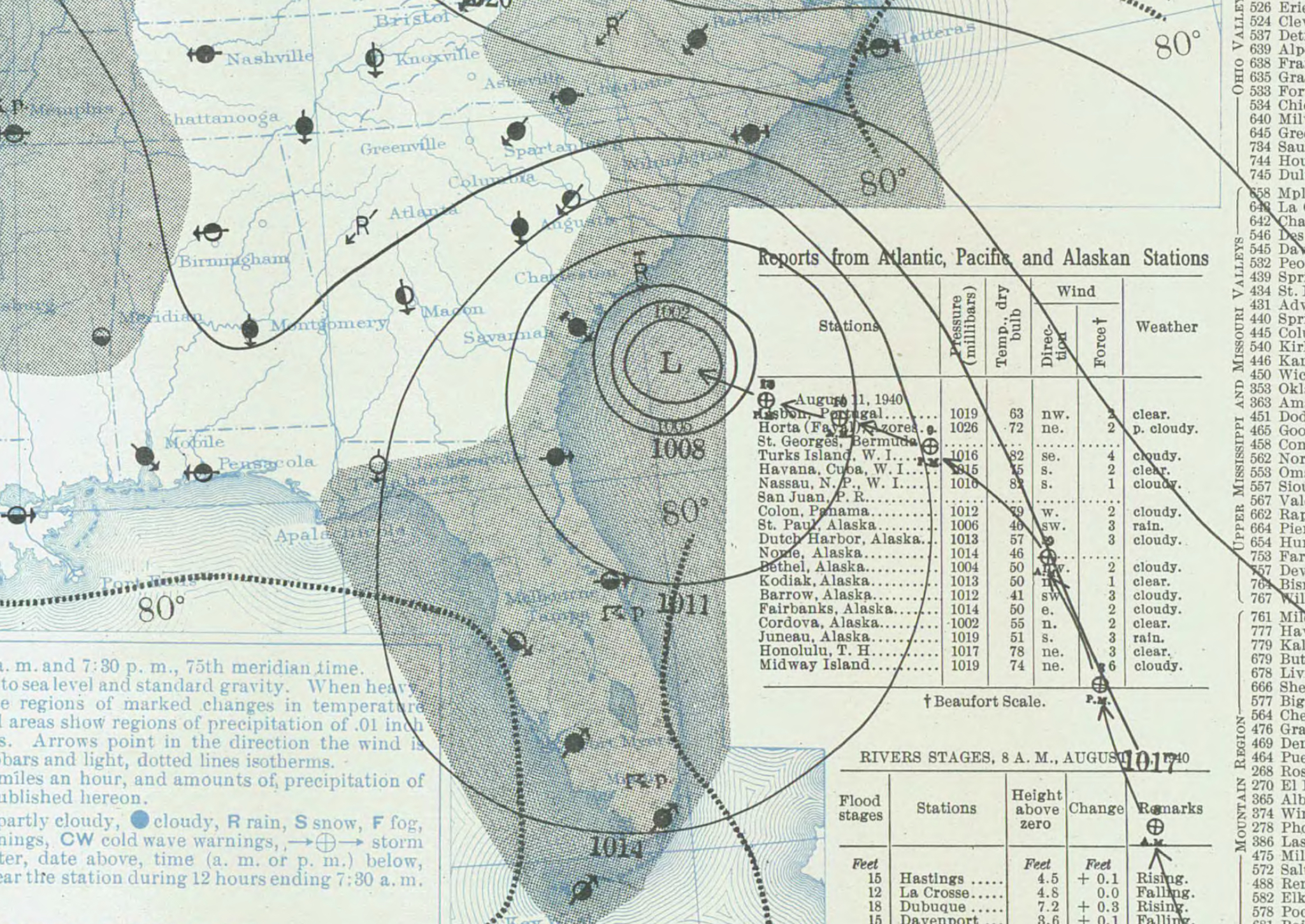
- Surface weather analysis of the hurricane nearing landfall in South Carolina on August 11

Meteorological history
- Formed: August 5, 1940
- Dissipated: August 15, 1940

Category 2 hurricane
- 1-minute sustained (SSHWS/NWS)
- Highest winds: 100 mph (155 km/h)
- Lowest pressure: 972 mbar (hPa); 28.70 inHg

Overall effects
- Fatalities: 50 direct, 2 indirect
- Damage: $13 million (1940 USD)
- Areas affected: Georgia, South Carolina, North Carolina, Tennessee, Virginia
- IBTrACS
- Part of the 1940 Atlantic hurricane season

The 1940 South Carolina hurricane was a Category 2 hurricane that struck the Georgia and South Carolina coast between August 11 and 12, 1940. After forming north of the Leeward Islands, the storm moved west-northwest, moving east of the Bahamas before resuming a west-northwest track towards the Southeastern United States. Hurricane warnings were in effect for the United States coastline near and north of where the center made landfall. A 13-foot storm tide was measured along the South Carolina coast, while over 15 inches (380 mm) of rain fell across northern North Carolina. Significant flooding and landslides struck Georgia, North Carolina, Tennessee, and Virginia during the system's slow trek as a weakening tropical storm, and then as an extratropical cyclone, through the Southeast. The landslides which struck North Carolina were considered a once in a century event. Damages relating to the storm totaled $13 million (1940 USD) and 50 people perished.

== Meteorological history ==
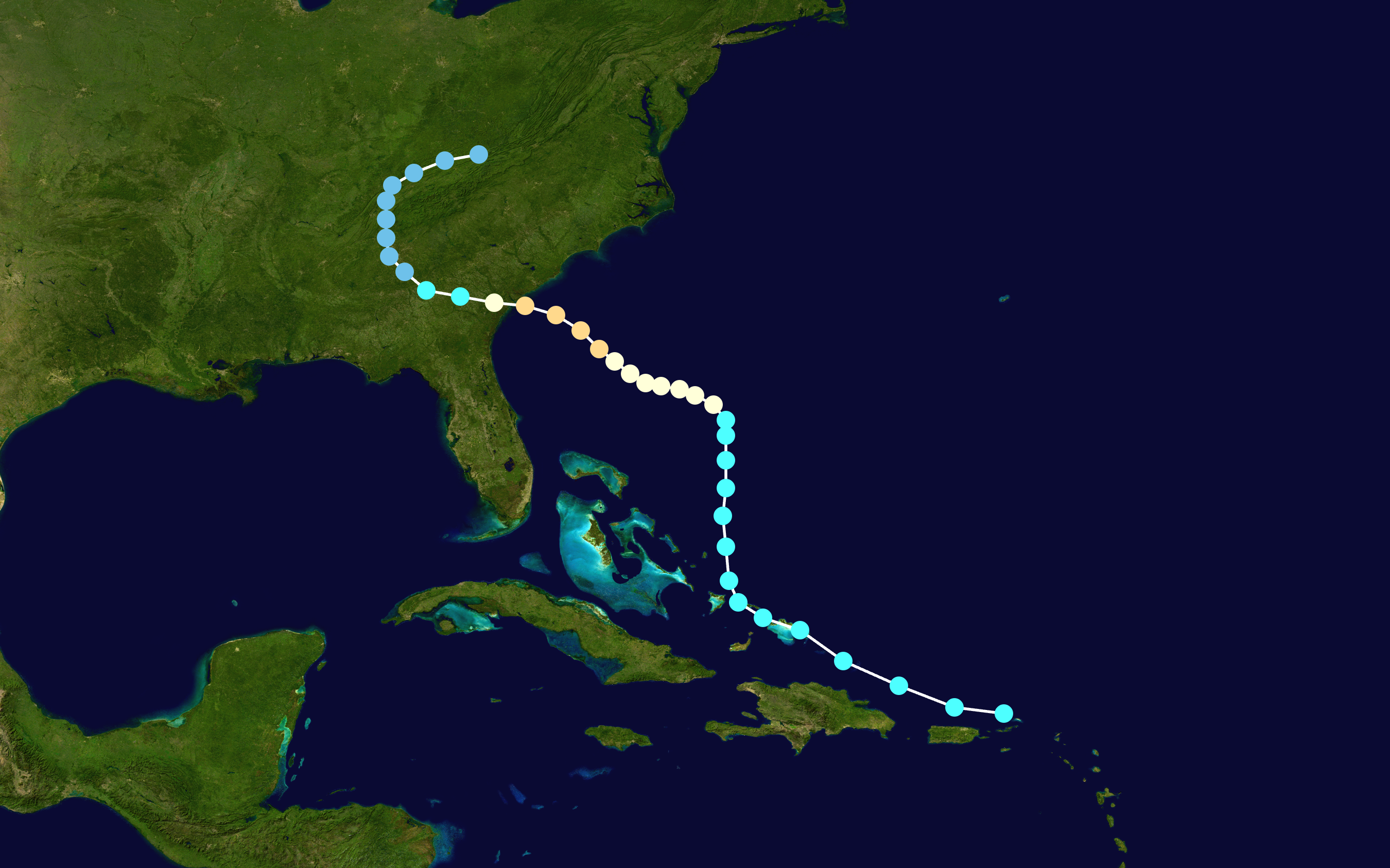
Map plotting the storm's track and intensity, according to the Saffir–Simpson scale Map key Saffir–Simpson scale Tropical depression (≤38 mph, ≤62 km/h) Tropical storm (39–73 mph, 63–118 km/h) Category 1 (74–95 mph, 119–153 km/h) Category 2 (96–110 mph, 154–177 km/h) Category 3 (111–129 mph, 178–208 km/h) Category 4 (130–156 mph, 209–251 km/h) Category 5 (≥157 mph, ≥252 km/h) Unknown Storm type Tropical cyclone Subtropical cyclone Extratropical cyclone, remnant low, tropical disturbance, or monsoon depression

Morning weather charts detected a "slight" disturbance between St. Martin and St. Thomas on August 5. Around 18:00 UTC that day, a tropical depression developed about 30 mi (48 km) west-northwest of Anegada in the British Virgin Islands.

The storm moved moving west-northwest near the Mona Passage, bringing squalls of 44 miles per hour (71 km/h) to San Juan, Puerto Rico. On August 6, the developing storm was near the southeastern Bahamas, bringing moderate to rough seas. The cyclone turned northward after its close approach to the southeastern Bahamas. By August 10 a ship reported that winds were hurricane force. In the afternoon of August 11, the hurricane made landfall near Beaufort, South Carolina where it moved inland and turned just northeast of Savannah, Georgia between 5 and 6 p.m. on the same day. Savannah's wind peaked at 73 miles per hour (117 km/h) and the pressure fell to 28.78 inches of mercury (975 hPa). It was the area's worst storm in 29 years. Hurricane-force winds were witnessed between Savannah and Charleston. Weakening into a tropical storm that evening, for the next four or five days the storm meandered inland as a weak tropical storm before evolving into an extratropical cyclone on the evening of August 14.

== Preparations and impact ==
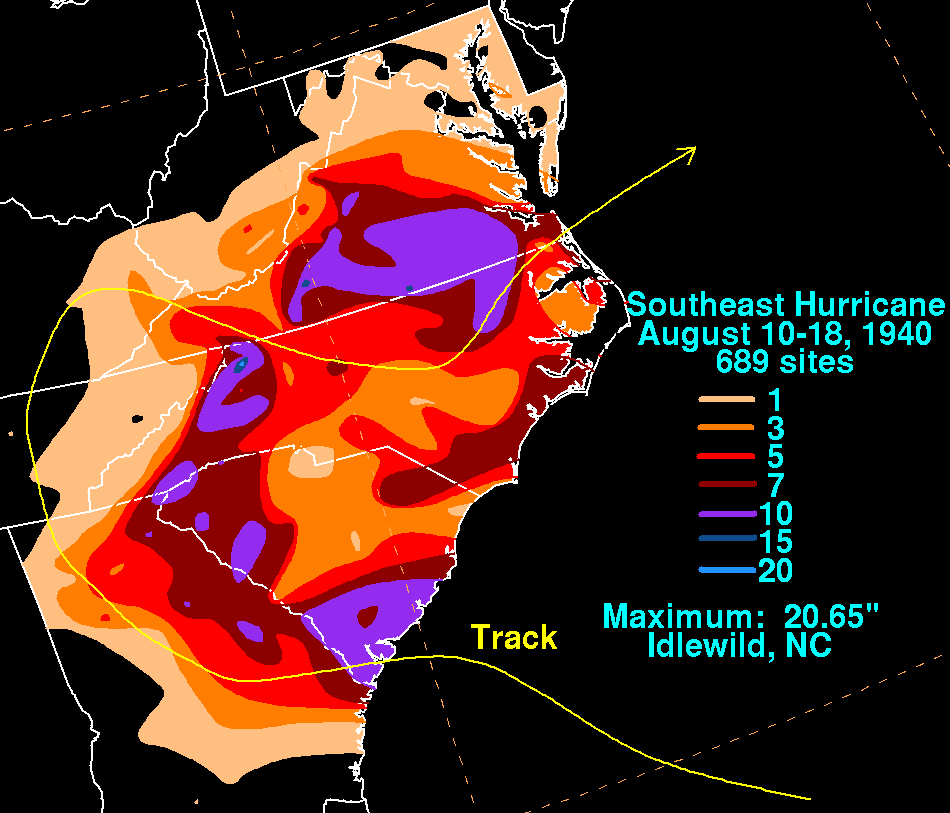
Rainfall totals from the hurricane from August 10-18

From August 7 and 9, small craft were advised to exercise caution over the eastern Bahamas and western subtropical Atlantic Ocean as the system approached the region. By 9:30 a.m. on August 10, small craft warnings were in effect for the extreme northern Bahamas, and along the United States coast from Miami, Florida to Cape Hatteras, North Carolina. By the morning of August 11, storm warnings were in effect from Wilmington, North Carolina northward to Cape Hatteras and from Savannah, Georgia to Fernandina Beach, Florida. Hurricane warnings were in effect from Savannah northward to Wilmington. All coastal warnings were dropped by August 12.

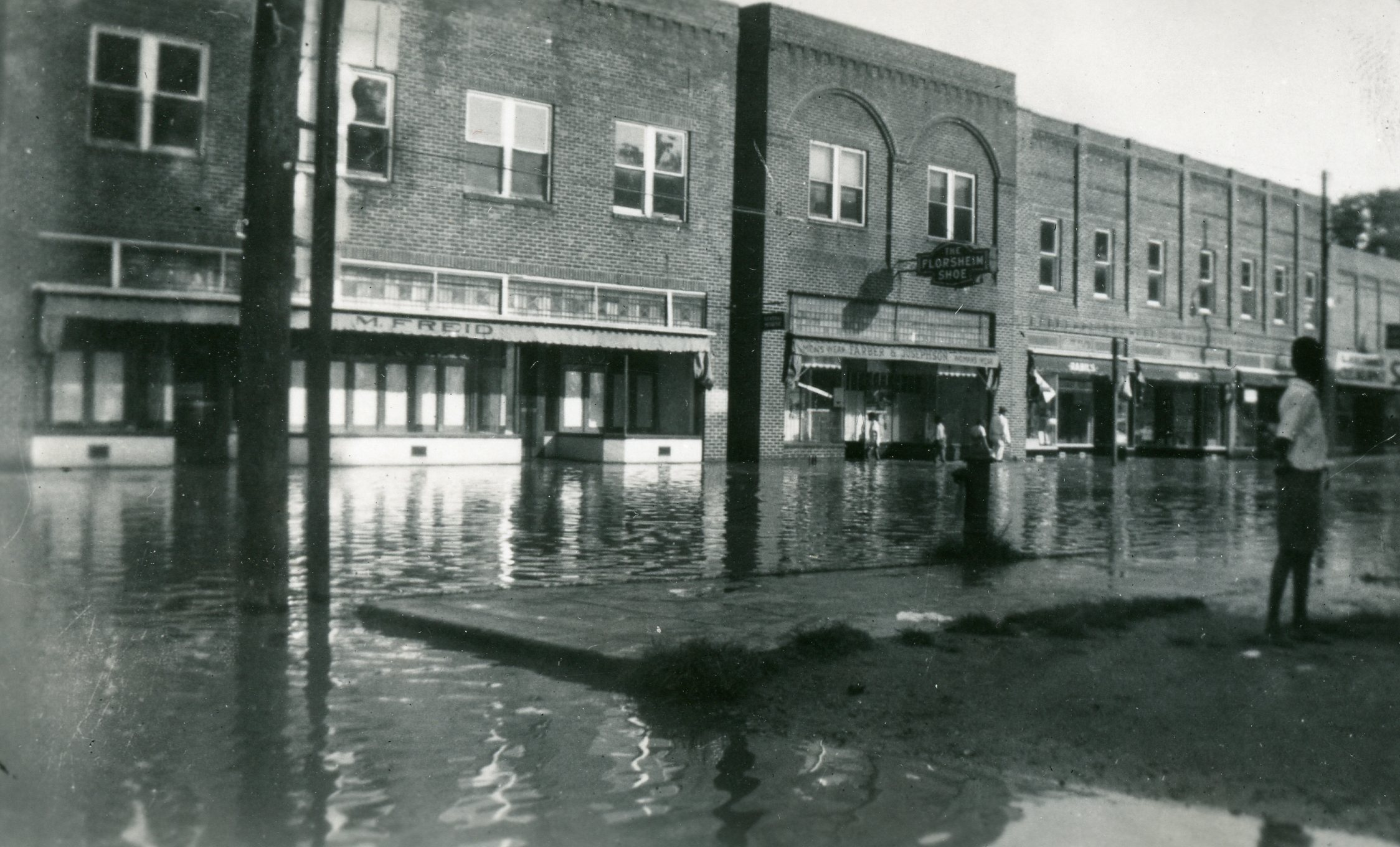
Flooding in Weldon, North Carolina

A storm tide of 13 feet (4.0 m) was measured along the coast of South Carolina. The cyclone inflicted $1.5 million in damage in Charleston, South Carolina, while Savannah, Georgia received $1 million in damage. Damage to the country's coastline totaled $3 million (1940 USD). Two people at Savannah died, one of whom from heart failure due to fright. Near the point of landfall, a total of 10.84 inches (275 mm) of rainfall fell at Beaufort, South Carolina within a 24-hour period. The highest reported rainfall amount in Georgia was recorded was 13.68 inches (347 mm) one mile east of Louisville while the highest amount in South Carolina was reported from Charleston, where 12.66 inches (322 mm) fell. On the coastal areas where the hurricane hit, there was a considerable loss of life. Early press reports said that 35 had died. According to the Monthly Weather Review, the deaths were low because of hurricane warnings and evacuations. However, modern sources indicate that 50 people died during this storm.

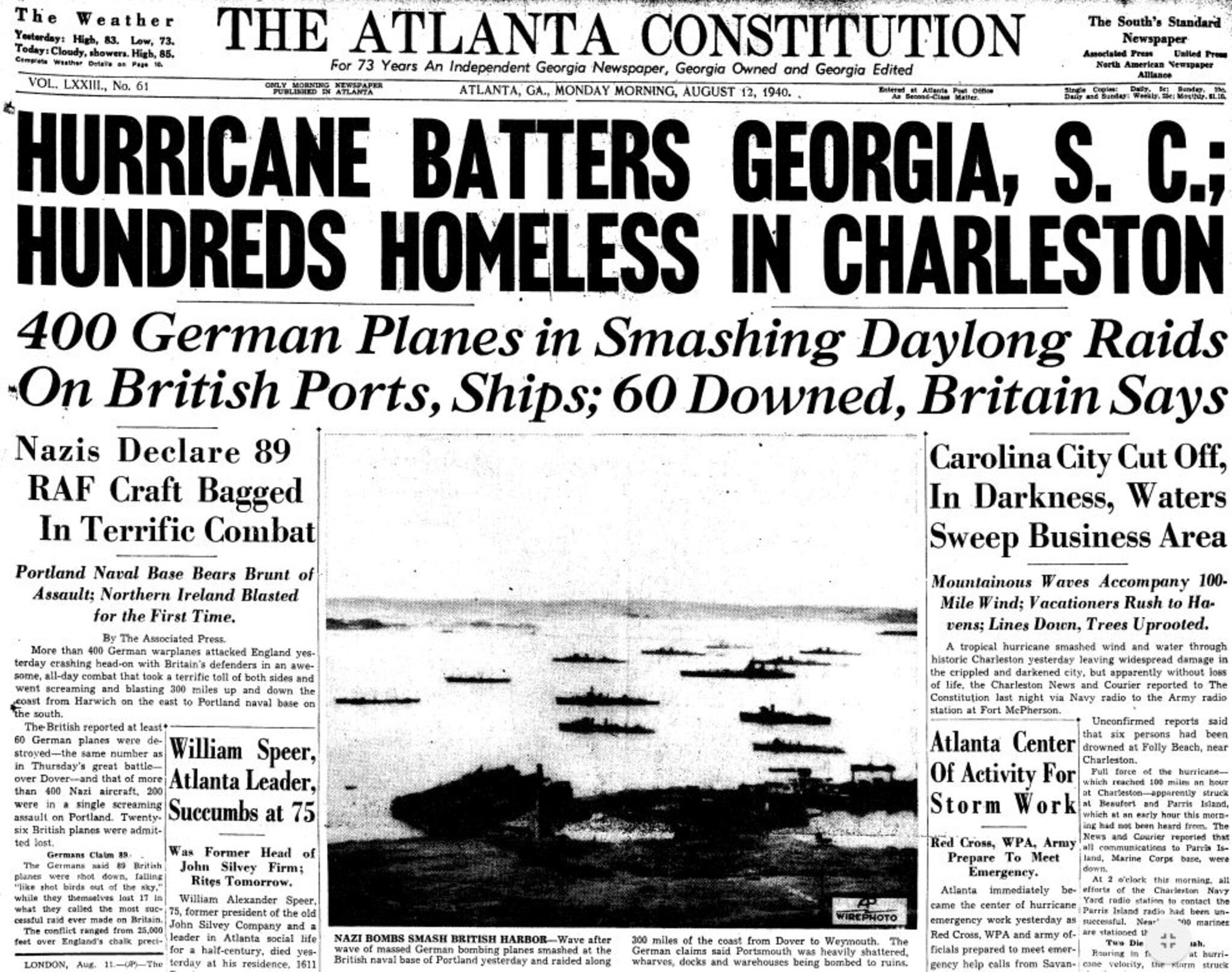
The Atlanta Constitution Newspaper on August 12, regarding the hurricane’s impact

After leaving the coast, the dissipating storm brought heavy rains that sparked disastrous flash floods. The floods inundated much of Tennessee, the Carolinas and northern Georgia. Rainfall amounts across western North Carolina exceeded 15 inches (380 mm), with the highest amount recorded at Idlewild, where 20.65 inches (525 mm) fell. Landslides were common in the mountains of western North Carolina, where it is considered a once in over 100 year landslide event. The East Tennessee and Western North Carolina railroad line was severed so badly it ceased operation. The peak discharge of the flood along Wilson Creek near Adako, North Carolina was estimated at 99,000 cubic feet per second (2,800 m^{3}/s). A total of 26 perished during the Deep Gap Debris Flow in Watauga County, North Carolina alone. Major portions of the county were cut off for two weeks. Debris flows and flooding cut off U.S. Highway 421 in 21 places through a six-mile stretch of roadway between Deep Gap and Maple Springs in Wilkes County, North Carolina. Flooding destroyed 90% of the bridges in Caldwell County, North Carolina. Press reports stated that 30 people died in the floods. Damage amounted to over $10 million (1940 USD).

Rains began in Virginia on August 13, as the system entered the state from the west. Deluges flooded locations across southern and western sections of the Old Dominion. Hampton Roads measured 4.76 inches (121 mm) of rainfall. The highest rainfall amount statewide was recorded at Copper Hill, where 17.03 inches (433 mm) fell. Emporia, on the Meherrin River, recorded a flood of record on August 17 when the river crested at 31.50 feet (9.60 m), which was 8.5 feet (2.6 m) feet above flood stage. Mountain rivers and streams overflowed, washing out bridges and causing landslides which blocked roads. Several highways between Norfolk, southwest Virginia, and Asheville, North Carolina were closed. A collision on August 13 involving the oil screw F.B. Scarbrough 5 miles (8.0 km) above Coles Point may have been caused by this system.

== See also ==
- List of South Carolina hurricanes
- List of wettest tropical cyclones in North Carolina
