= 2024 North Carolina State Treasurer election =

- November 5, 2024
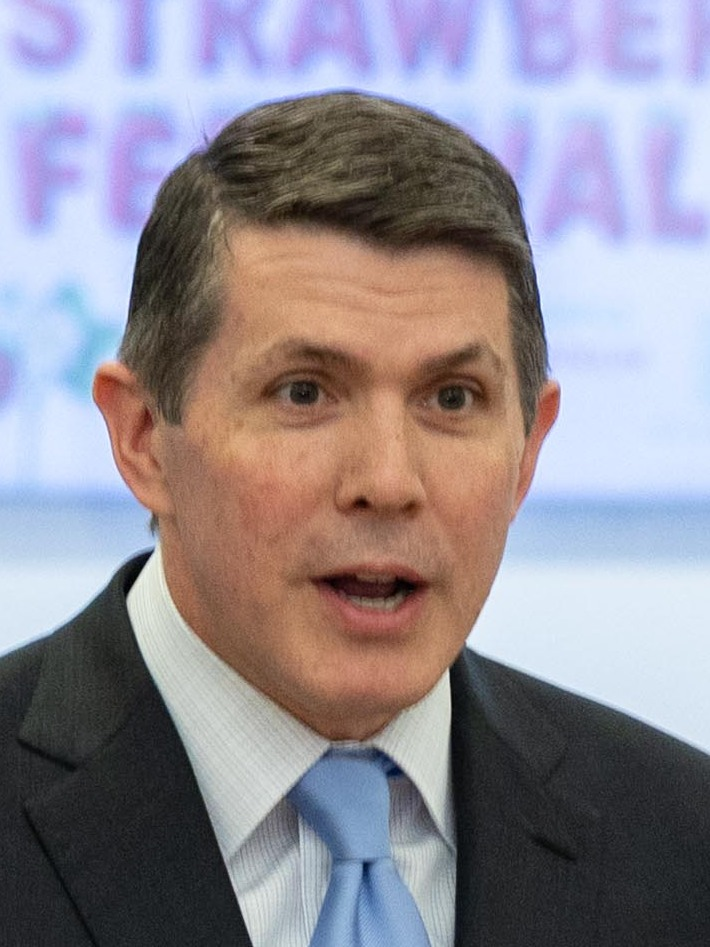

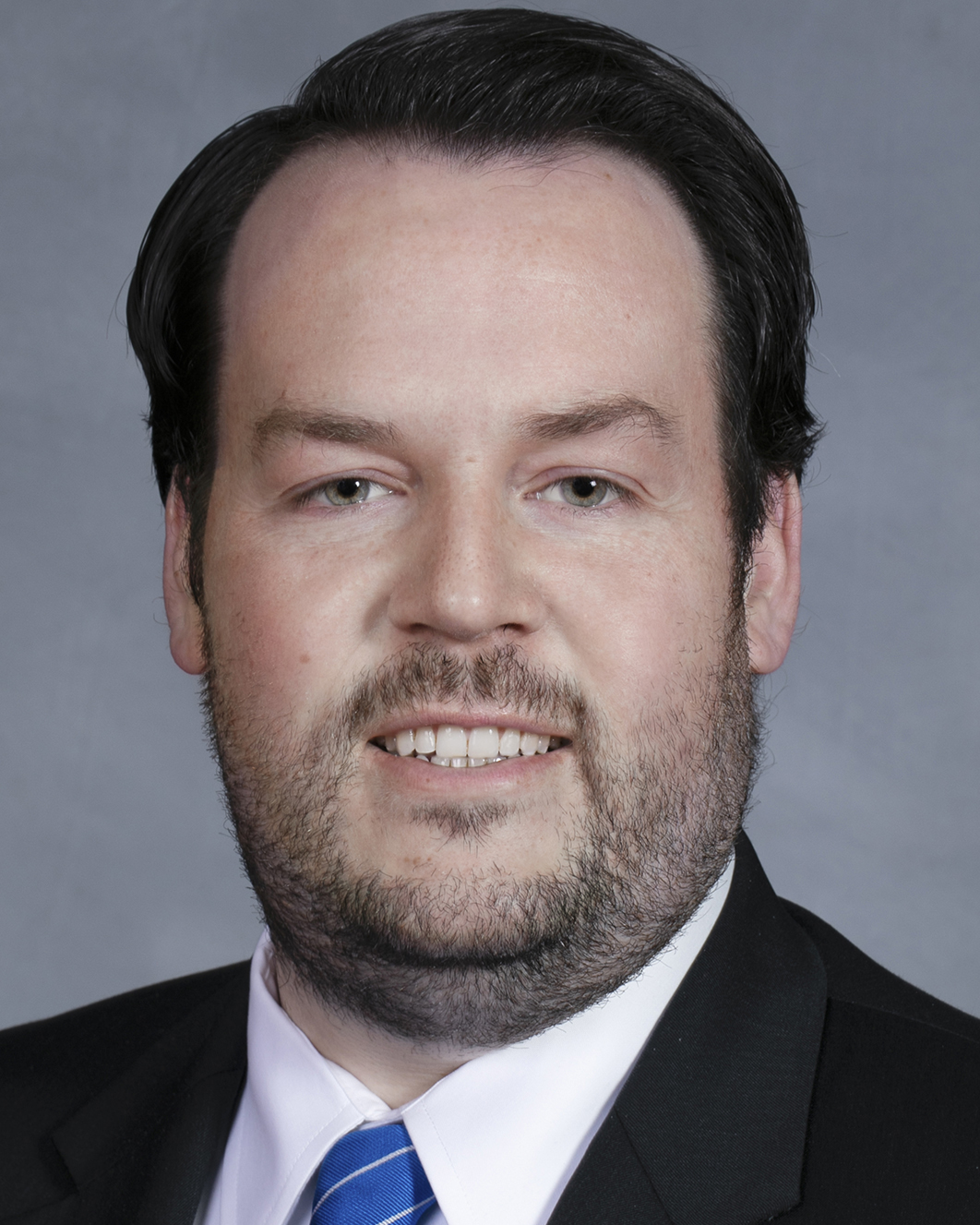
Nominee	Brad Briner	Wesley Harris
Party	Republican	Democratic
Popular vote	2,900,059	2,629,444
Percentage	52.45%	47.55%
- Briner: 50–60% 60–70% 70–80% 80–90% Harris: 50–60% 60–70% 70–80%
State Treasurer before election
Dale Folwell
Republican
Elected State Treasurer
Brad Briner
Republican

The 2024 North Carolina State Treasurer election was held on November 5, 2024, to elect the North Carolina State Treasurer, concurrently with elections to the U.S. House of Representatives, governor, and other state and local elections. Incumbent Republican treasurer Dale Folwell declined to seek re-election a third term and instead ran for governor.

Primary elections were held on March 5, 2024, also known as Super Tuesday. Briner won the Republican primary with roughly 40% of the vote over candidates A.J. Daoud and Rachel Johnson, and Harris won the Democratic primary with 67% of the vote against Gabriel Esparza.

Briner defeated Harris in the general election with 52.45% of the vote.

== Republican primary ==
=== Candidates ===
==== Nominee ====
- Brad Briner, investment manager for Michael Bloomberg and University of North Carolina at Chapel Hill trustee

==== Eliminated in primary ====
- A.J. Daoud, former member of the North Carolina Education Lottery Commission and perennial candidate (originally ran for state auditor)
- Rachel Johnson, businesswoman

==== Withdrawn ====
- John Bradford, state representative from the 98th district (2015-2019, 2021-2025) (ran for U.S. House)
- James Upchurch, former Guilford County commissioner (ran for state auditor)

==== Declined ====
- Dale Folwell, incumbent state treasurer (ran for governor)

=== Results ===
Results by county Briner: 30–40%; 40–50%; 50–60%; Johnson: 30–40%; 40–50%; 50–60%; Daoud: 30–40%; 40–50%

Republican primary results
Party	Candidate	Votes	%
Republican	Brad Briner	346,160	39.94%
Republican	Rachel Johnson	299,158	34.51%
Republican	A. J. Daoud	221,442	25.55%
Total votes		866,760	100.0%

== Democratic primary ==
=== Candidates ===
==== Nominee ====
- Wesley Harris, state representative from the 105th district (2019-2025)

==== Eliminated in primary ====
- Gabe Esparza, former executive and Small Business Administration official

=== Polling ===
Poll source	Date(s) administered	Sample size (Note: Key: A – all adults RV – registered voters LV – likely voters V – unclear)	Margin of error	Gabe Esparza	Wesley Harris	Undecided
Public Policy Polling (D)	December 15–16, 2023	556 (LV)	± 4.2%	9%	14%	77%

=== Results ===
Results by county Harris: 50–60%; 60–70%; 70–80%; 80–90%; ≥90%; Esparza: 50–60%

Democratic primary results
Party	Candidate	Votes	%
Democratic	Wesley Harris	433,791	66.59%
Democratic	Gabe Esparza	217,689	33.41%
Total votes		651,480	100.0%

== General election ==
=== Polling ===
Poll source	Date(s) administered	Sample size	Margin of error	Brad Briner (R)	Wesley Harris (D)	Undecided
ActiVote	October 8–26, 2024	400 (LV)	± 4.9%	49%	51%	–
Cygnal (R) (Note: Poll sponsored by the Carolina Journal)	October 12–14, 2024	600 (LV)	± 3.99%	43%	42%	15%
ActiVote	August 20 – September 22, 2024	400 (LV)	± 4.9%	50%	50%	–
Cygnal (R)	September 15–16, 2024	600 (LV)	± 4.0%	42%	40%	18%
YouGov (D) (Note: Poll sponsored by Carolina Forward)	August 5–9, 2024	802 (RV)	± 3.9%	40%	41%	20%
Cygnal (R)	August 4–5, 2024	600 (LV)	± 4.0%	40%	35%	25%
Cygnal (R) (Note: Poll sponsored by the John Locke Foundation)	March 6–7, 2024	600 (LV)	± 4.0%	43%	37%	20%

=== Results ===
2024 North Carolina State Treasurer election
Party	Candidate	Votes	%	±%
Republican	Brad Briner	2,900,059	52.45%	–0.13%
Democratic	Wesley Harris	2,629,444	47.55%	+0.13%
Total votes		5,529,503	100.0%	
Republican hold				

==== By county ====
2024 North Carolina State Treasurer election (by county)
County	Brad Briner Republican		Wesley Harris Democratic		Margin		Total votes cast
County	#	%	#	%	#	%	Total votes cast
Alamance	47,793	54.50%	39,904	45.50%	7,889	9.00%	87,697
Alexander	15,828	79.00%	4,207	21.00%	11,621	58.00%	20,035
Alleghany	4,657	74.76%	1,572	25.24%	3,085	49.52%	6,229
Anson	5,277	49.78%	5,324	50.22%	-47	-0.44%	10,601
Ashe	11,315	72.07%	4,386	27.93%	6,929	44.14%	15,701
Avery	7,006	76.95%	2,099	23.05%	4,907	53.90%	9,105
Beaufort	16,993	65.65%	8,893	34.35%	8,100	31.30%	25,886
Bertie	3,655	40.91%	5,279	59.09%	-1,624	-18.18%	8,934
Bladen	9,463	58.39%	6,744	41.61%	2,719	16.78%	16,207
Brunswick	68,125	64.55%	37,412	35.45%	30,713	29.10%	105,537
Buncombe	59,349	38.32%	95,511	61.68%	-36,162	-23.36%	154,860
Burke	31,302	70.20%	13,285	29.80%	18,017	40.40%	44,587
Cabarrus	63,862	54.91%	52,436	45.09%	11,426	9.82%	116,298
Caldwell	32,339	76.26%	10,069	23.74%	22,270	52.52%	42,408
Camden	4,599	75.50%	1,492	24.50%	3,107	51.00%	6,091
Carteret	32,323	72.74%	12,114	27.26%	20,209	45.48%	44,437
Caswell	7,180	61.66%	4,465	38.34%	2,715	23.32%	11,645
Catawba	58,039	69.83%	25,081	30.17%	32,958	39.66%	83,120
Chatham	23,004	45.28%	27,797	54.72%	-4,793	-9.44%	50,801
Cherokee	13,739	78.71%	3,717	21.29%	10,022	57.42%	17,456
Chowan	4,462	61.12%	2,838	38.88%	1,624	22.24%	7,300
Clay	5,624	75.51%	1,824	24.49%	3,800	51.02%	7,448
Cleveland	33,724	67.18%	16,477	32.82%	17,247	34.35%	50,201
Columbus	16,804	65.63%	8,802	34.37%	8,002	31.26%	25,606
Craven	33,263	61.10%	21,181	38.90%	12,082	22.20%	54,444
Cumberland	58,329	42.68%	78,338	57.32%	-20,009	-14.64%	136,667
Currituck	13,002	74.47%	4,457	25.53%	8,545	48.94%	17,459
Dare	14,610	60.58%	9,505	39.42%	5,105	21.16%	24,115
Davidson	67,904	73.89%	23,990	26.11%	43,914	47.78%	91,894
Davie	19,682	74.59%	6,704	25.41%	12,978	49.18%	26,386
Duplin	14,186	63.98%	7,985	36.02%	6,201	27.96%	22,171
Durham	36,224	20.47%	140,713	79.53%	-104,489	-59.06%	176,937
Edgecombe	9,124	37.88%	14,961	62.12%	-5,837	-24.24%	24,085
Forsyth	88,877	44.95%	108,836	55.05%	-19,959	-10.10%	197,713
Franklin	23,529	56.54%	18,089	43.46%	5,440	13.08%	41,618
Gaston	72,790	62.98%	42,780	37.02%	30,010	25.96%	115,570
Gates	3,384	59.96%	2,260	40.04%	1,124	19.92%	5,644
Graham	3,551	79.58%	911	20.42%	2,640	59.16%	4,462
Granville	17,121	54.55%	14,267	45.45%	2,854	9.10%	31,388
Greene	4,711	57.28%	3,513	42.72%	1,198	14.56%	8,224
Guilford	110,205	39.87%	166,191	60.13%	-55,986	-20.26%	276,396
Halifax	9,353	39.93%	14,071	60.07%	-4,718	-20.14%	23,424
Harnett	38,752	62.25%	23,496	37.75%	15,256	24.50%	62,248
Haywood	23,068	62.40%	13,900	37.60%	9,168	24.80%	36,968
Henderson	40,608	59.23%	27,957	40.77%	12,651	18.46%	68,565
Hertford	3,350	35.17%	6,176	64.83%	-2,826	-29.66%	9,526
Hoke	10,020	45.85%	11,832	54.15%	-1,812	-8.30%	21,852
Hyde	1,385	59.39%	947	40.61%	438	18.78%	2,332
Iredell	72,293	67.43%	34,921	32.57%	37,372	34.86%	107,214
Jackson	11,658	54.72%	9,645	45.28%	2,013	9.44%	21,303
Johnston	73,605	61.21%	46,653	38.79%	26,952	22.42%	120,258
Jones	3,301	62.18%	2,008	37.82%	1,293	24.36%	5,309
Lee	16,911	58.30%	12,096	41.70%	4,815	16.60%	29,007
Lenoir	14,198	52.88%	12,649	47.12%	1,549	5.76%	26,847
Lincoln	39,859	73.63%	14,273	26.37%	25,586	47.26%	54,132
Macon	14,510	69.17%	6,468	30.83%	8,042	38.34%	20,978
Madison	7,957	60.01%	5,303	39.99%	2,654	20.02%	13,260
Martin	6,227	53.14%	5,491	46.86%	736	6.28%	11,718
McDowell	17,068	74.38%	5,880	25.62%	11,188	48.76%	22,948
Mecklenburg	203,182	35.89%	363,010	64.11%	-159,828	-28.22%	566,192
Mitchell	6,562	77.63%	1,891	22.37%	4,671	55.26%	8,453
Montgomery	8,741	67.81%	4,150	32.19%	4,591	35.62%	12,891
Moore	39,707	66.65%	19,871	33.35%	19,836	33.30%	59,578
Nash	25,987	50.52%	25,447	49.48%	540	1.04%	51,434
New Hanover	69,319	51.81%	64,481	48.19%	4,838	3.62%	133,800
Northampton	3,663	40.89%	5,295	59.11%	-1,632	-18.22%	8,958
Onslow	52,240	68.05%	24,529	31.95%	27,711	36.10%	76,769
Orange	22,609	26.54%	62,590	73.46%	-39,981	-46.92%	85,199
Pamlico	5,158	66.38%	2,612	33.62%	2,546	32.76%	7,770
Pasquotank	10,330	51.99%	9,539	48.01%	791	3.98%	19,869
Pender	25,775	68.46%	11,873	31.54%	13,902	36.92%	37,648
Perquimans	5,265	69.66%	2,293	30.34%	2,972	39.32%	7,558
Person	12,640	60.74%	8,171	39.26%	4,469	21.48%	20,811
Pitt	39,652	47.08%	44,567	52.92%	-4,915	-5.84%	84,219
Polk	7,965	62.75%	4,728	37.25%	3,237	25.50%	12,693
Randolph	58,406	78.87%	15,643	21.13%	42,763	57.74%	74,049
Richmond	11,228	58.60%	7,934	41.40%	3,294	17.20%	19,162
Robeson	26,347	59.47%	17,956	40.53%	8,391	18.94%	44,303
Rockingham	32,492	67.41%	15,705	32.59%	16,787	34.82%	48,197
Rowan	49,941	68.49%	22,980	31.51%	26,961	36.98%	72,921
Rutherford	24,741	73.56%	8,893	26.44%	15,848	47.12%	33,634
Sampson	17,193	64.08%	9,638	35.92%	7,555	28.16%	26,831
Scotland	7,383	52.13%	6,779	47.87%	604	4.26%	14,162
Stanly	26,896	75.38%	8,784	24.62%	18,112	50.76%	35,680
Stokes	21,011	79.48%	5,424	20.52%	15,587	58.96%	26,435
Surry	27,803	76.12%	8,721	23.88%	19,082	52.24%	36,524
Swain	4,024	61.24%	2,547	38.76%	1,477	22.48%	6,571
Transylvania	11,558	57.08%	8,692	42.92%	2,866	14.16%	20,250
Tyrrell	973	58.47%	691	41.53%	282	16.94%	1,664
Union	86,640	64.48%	47,731	35.52%	38,909	28.96%	134,371
Vance	8,249	42.13%	11,330	57.87%	-3,081	-15.74%	19,579
Wake	252,287	39.76%	382,222	60.24%	-129,935	-20.48%	634,509
Warren	3,888	39.04%	6,072	60.96%	-2,184	-21.92%	9,960
Washington	2,665	45.64%	3,174	54.36%	-509	-8.72%	5,839
Watauga	15,074	48.14%	16,239	51.86%	-1,165	-3.72%	31,313
Wayne	31,009	58.15%	22,314	41.85%	8,695	16.30%	53,323
Wilkes	27,898	79.29%	7,285	20.71%	20,613	58.58%	35,183
Wilson	19,321	49.27%	19,892	50.73%	-571	-1.46%	39,213
Yadkin	16,142	81.28%	3,718	18.72%	12,424	62.56%	19,860
Yancey	7,018	64.53%	3,858	35.47%	3,160	29.06%	10,876
Totals	2,900,059	52.45%	2,629,444	47.55%	270,615	4.90%	5,529,503

==== By congressional district ====
Briner won 11 of 14 congressional districts, including one that elected a Democrat.

District	Briner	Harris	Representative
1st	51%	49%	Don Davis
2nd	36%	64%	Deborah Ross
3rd	61%	39%	Greg Murphy
4th	29%	71%	Valerie Foushee
5th	59%	41%	Virginia Foxx
6th	59%	41%	Addison McDowell
7th	58%	42%	David Rouzer
8th	61%	39%	Mark Harris
9th	58%	42%	Richard Hudson
10th	60%	40%	Pat Harrigan
11th	55%	45%	Chuck Edwards
12th	29%	71%	Alma Adams
13th	59%	41%	Brad Knott
14th	58%	42%	Tim Moore

== See also ==
- 2024 North Carolina elections
- 2024 North Carolina Council of State elections
