= Dudley Shoals =

North Carolinian unincorporated community

Dudley Shoals, North Carolina
- Location within North Carolina Location within the United States
- Coordinates: 35°51′46.9656″N 81°22′42.1176″W
- Country: United States
- State: North Carolina
- County: Caldwell
- Township: Little River
- Elevation: 1,148 ft (350 m)
- Postal code: 28630
- Area code: 828

Dudley Shoals is a populated place and former village located in the Little River township of Caldwell County, North Carolina, United States. It is located about 10 miles (16.09 km) northeast of the town of Granite Falls.

Dudley Shoals houses Dudley Shoals Elementary School, part of the Caldwell County Schools school district.

Geologically, Dudley Shoals is abundant in Sillimanite crystals.

== History ==
The earliest known use of the name "Dudley Shoals" was in an 1875 document summarizing the first session of the Forty-third United States Congress; the name described the land containing the post roads a mail carrier would pass through to get from Hickory (then called Hickory Tavern) to Wilkesboro (then called Wilksborough).

Dudley Shoals was purchased around 1881 by A. J. Hamilton to build "a flour, saw, and single mill". He called his mill the Dudley Shoals Cotton Milling Company, planting cotton fields still in use today by yarn plants.

The area had a Baptist church by 1884.

By 1907, 179 students were enrolled in the mill-funded Dudley Shoals School, which provided 10 grades.

In 1913, Dudley Shoals was defined by the state of North Carolina as a village.

Throughout the 1940s and 1950s, three large Sillimanite deposits were discovered and studied in Dudley Shoals.

On January 1, 1947, Geitner George of the company Shuford Mills had purchased the cotton mills of Dudley Shoals and Granite Falls.

In 1978, Dudley Shoals lost its status as a village and was reclassified as a populated place.

In 1979, the existing Dudley Shoals Elementary School was formed.

== Notable people ==
- Madison Bumgarner (born 1989), MLB pitcher, 4x All-Star selection, 3x World Series champion and 2014 World Series MVP
- Eric Church (born 1977), country singer-songwriter
- Carl Story (1916–1995), bluegrass musician, "The Father of Bluegrass Gospel Music"
