= Jacqueline Schaffer =

American politician

Member of the North Carolina House of Representatives from the 105 district
- In office January 1, 2013 – April 22, 2016
- Preceded by: Ric Killian
- Succeeded by: Scott Stone

Personal details
- Education: Meredith College, Regent University

Jacqueline Schaffer is an American politician.

== Political career ==
Schaffer represented North Carolina's 105th House district for two terms taking office in 2013, and resigning on April 22, 2016, before her term expired. During her time in office Schaffer advocated for loosening gun control laws in North Carolina.

== Electoral history ==
North Carolina House of Representatives 105th district general election, 2014
Party	Candidate	Votes	%
Republican	Jacqueline Schaffer (incumbent)	15,270	100%
Total votes		15,270	100%

North Carolina House of Representatives 105th district general election, 2012
Party	Candidate	Votes	%
Republican	Jacqueline Schaffer	27,028	100%
Total votes		27,028	100%

North Carolina House of Representatives 105th district Republican primary election, 2012
Party	Candidate	Votes	%
Republican	Jacqueline Schaffer	4,077	57.18%
Republican	Ken Gjertsen	3,053	42.82%
Total votes		7,130	100%
