= Mortimer, North Carolina =

Ghost town in North Carolina, U.S.

Coordinates: 35°59′07″N 81°45′40″W

Mortimer, North Carolina is a ghost town in Wilson Creek Township, Caldwell County, in the northwestern part of the state.

Once a mill town with a population of around 800, it was founded in 1904 when the Ritter Lumber Company bought the land where Mortimer was built to house its workers. Mortimer had a company store, a blacksmith's shop, a church, a school, a hotel, a movie theater and several houses, some of which were used for boarding. It is said that Theodore Roosevelt stayed in the town's Lauren Inn. In 1916, a fire burned from Grandfather Mountain to Wilson Creek, soon followed by a flood, after which, the town was abandoned a year later. The Union Mills Company then briefly revitalized Mortimer in 1922. During the Great Depression, the Civilian Conservation Corps established a camp in Mortimer and had repaired most of the buildings damaged by the 1916 floods. The town flooded again in 1940 and was subsequently abandoned. Several remains are existent today, including machinery from the mill and the foundations of several buildings.
