= Andy Dulin =

American politician

Representative Andy Dulin
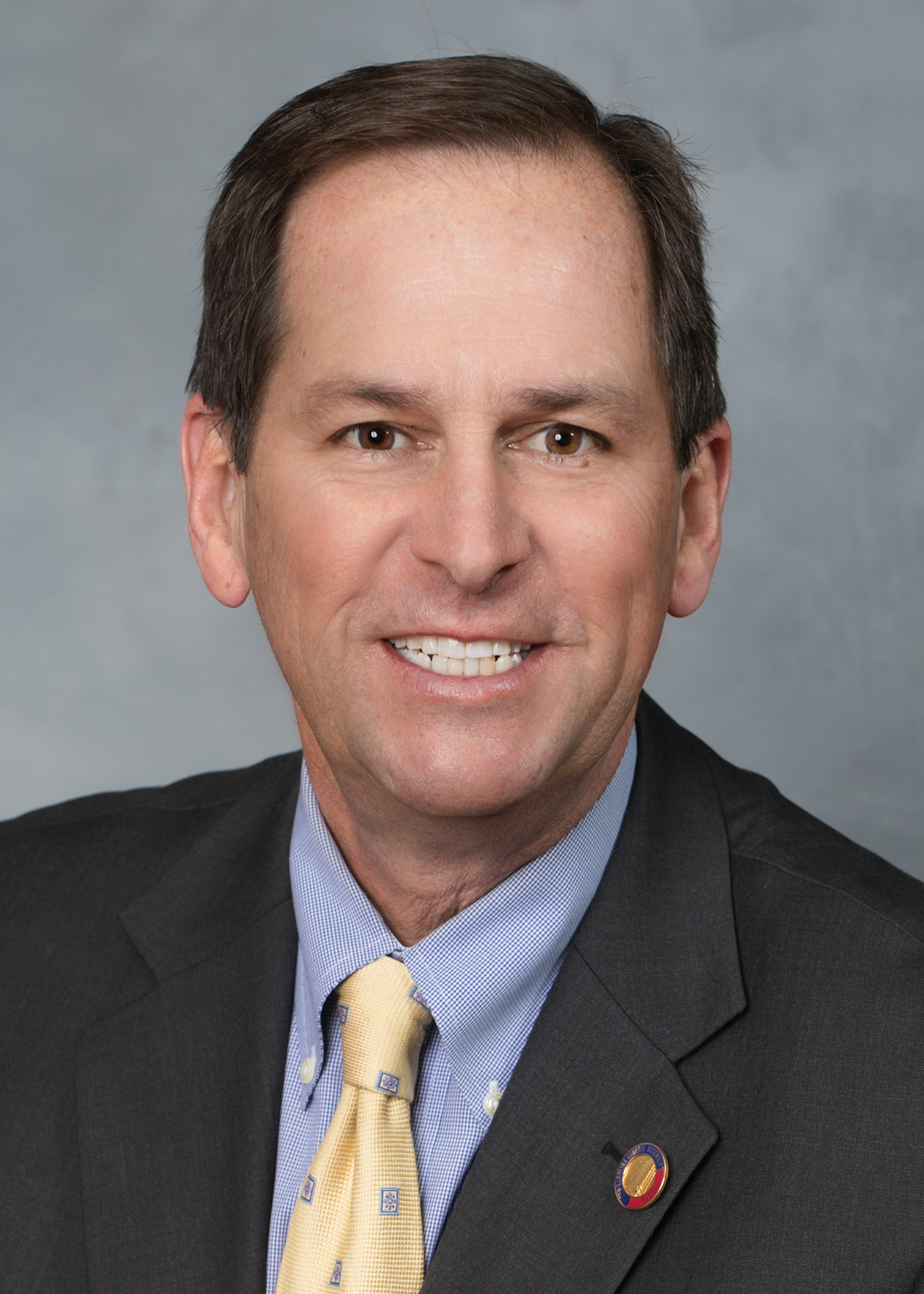

Member of the North Carolina House of Representatives from the 104th district
- In office January 1, 2017 – January 1, 2019
- Preceded by: Dan Bishop
- Succeeded by: Brandon Lofton

Member of the Charlotte City Council from the 6th district
- In office December 2005 – December 9, 2013
- Preceded by: John Tabor
- Succeeded by: Kenny Smith

Personal details
- Born: Charlotte, North Carolina
- Party: Republican
- Education: Appalachian State University
- Occupation: real estate and construction

Andy T. Dulin is an American politician. He was elected as a Republican to the North Carolina House of Representatives District 104, representing South-Central Charlotte, on November 8, 2016. He took office in January 2017 succeeding Dan Bishop who was elected to the North Carolina State Senate in the same general election. In 2018, Dulin lost re-election to Democrat Brandon Lofton. Dulin represented much of South Central Charlotte during his tenure in the NC House. Prior to his service in the NC house, Dulin previously served in the Charlotte City Council District 6, from 2005 to 2013.

== Committee assignments ==
=== 2017-2018 Session ===
- Appropriations
- Appropriations - Agriculture and Natural and Economic Resources
- Agriculture
- Health
- Insurance
- Pensions and Retirement
- Rules, Calendar, and Operations of the House

== Electoral history ==
=== 2018 ===
North Carolina House of Representatives 104th district general election, 2018
Party	Candidate	Votes	%
Democratic	Brandon Lofton	21,716	51.78%
Republican	Andy Dulin (incumbent)	20,220	48.22%
Total votes		41,936	100%
Democratic gain from Republican			

=== 2016 ===
North Carolina House of Representatives 104th district general election, 2016
Party	Candidate	Votes	%
Republican	Andy Dulin	24,700	55.32%
Democratic	Peter Noris	19,952	44.68%
Total votes		44,652	100%
Republican hold			

=== 2012 ===
United States House of Representatives North Carolina's 9th congressional district Republican primary election, 2012
Party	Candidate	Votes	%
Republican	Robert Pittenger	29,999	32.45%
Republican	Jim Pendergraph	23,401	25.31%
Republican	Edwin Peacock III	11,336	12.26%
Republican	Ric Killian	9,691	10.48%
Republican	Dan Barry	5,515	5.97%
Republican	Andy Dulin	4,526	4.90%
Republican	Mike Steinberg	2,297	2.48%
Republican	Jon Gauthier	2,056	2.22%
Republican	Ken Leonczyk	2,047	2.21%
Republican	Richard Lynch	1,000	1.08%
Republican	Michael Shaffer (withdrew)	579	0.63%
Total votes		92,447	100.00%

Civic offices
Preceded by John Tabor	Member of the Charlotte City Council from the 6th district 2005–2013	Succeeded by Kenny Smith
North Carolina House of Representatives
Preceded by Dan Bishop	Member of the North Carolina House of Representatives from the 104th district 2017–2019	Succeeded by Brandon Lofton
