= Brandon Lofton =

American politician

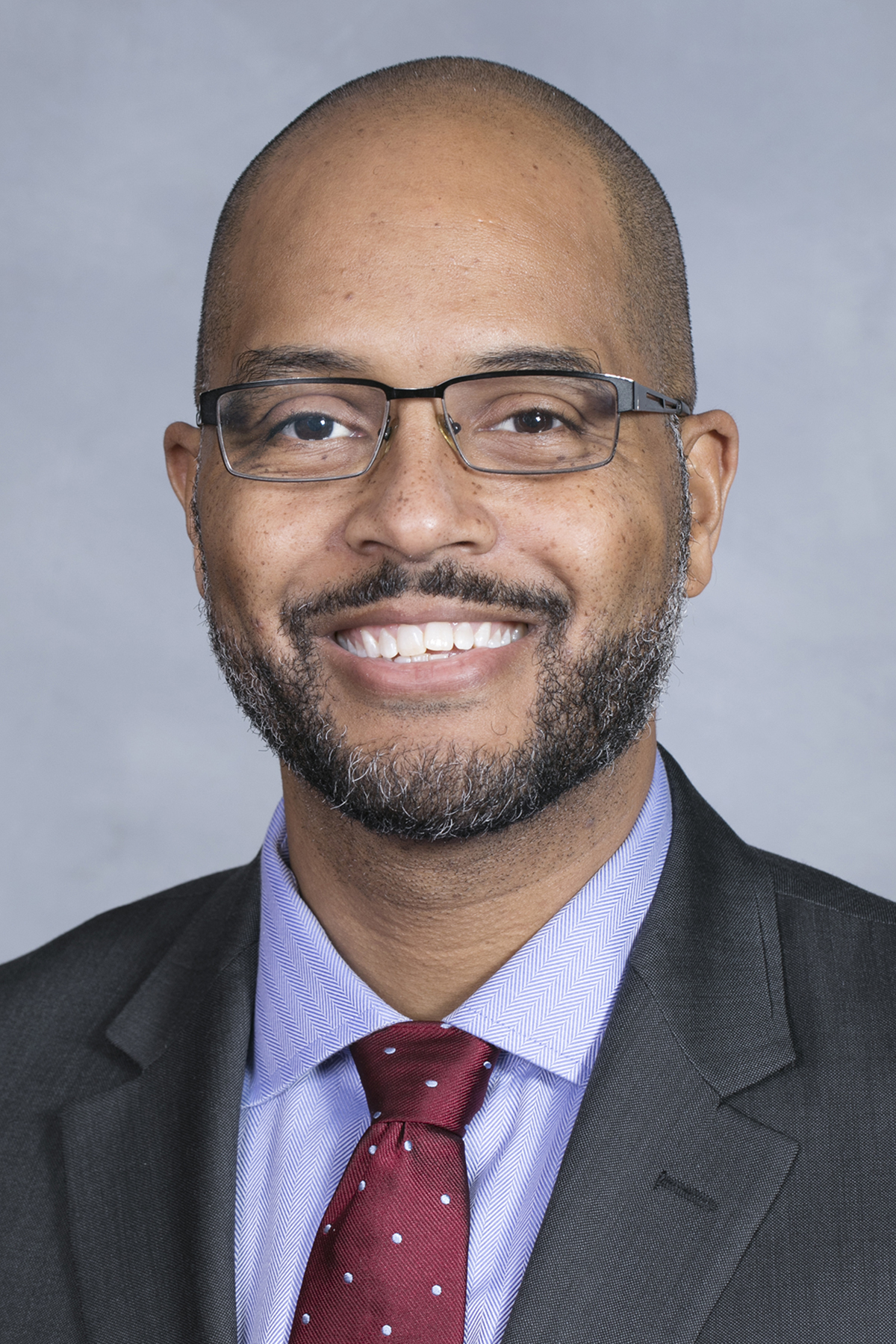

Member of the North Carolina House of Representatives from the 104th district
- Incumbent
- Assumed office January 1, 2019
- Preceded by: Andy Dulin

Personal details
- Born: Brandon Marcus Lofton; November 5, 1978 (age 47)
- Party: Democratic
- Spouse: Kellie
- Children: 2
- Education: University of North Carolina, Chapel Hill (BA); New York University (JD)
- Occupation: Attorney
- Website: Official website

Brandon Marcus Lofton (born November 5, 1978) is a Democratic member of the North Carolina House of Representatives. He has represented the State's 104th district (including constituents in the southwestern portion of Mecklenburg County) since 2019.

== Career ==
Lofton won the election on November 6, 2018, from the platform of Democratic Party. He secured fifty-two percent of the vote while his closest rival incumbent Republican Andy Dulin secured forty-eight percent. He was re-elected in 2020, defeating Republican challenger Don Pomeroy.

== Committee assignments ==
=== 2021-2022 Session ===
- Agriculture
- Commerce
- Finance
- Judiciary IV
- Local Government

=== 2019-2020 Session ===
- Agriculture
- Commerce
- Finance
- Judiciary
- State and Local Government

== Electoral history ==
=== 2020 ===
North Carolina House of Representatives 104th district general election, 2020
Party	Candidate	Votes	%
Democratic	Brandon Lofton (incumbent)	25,513	53.86%
Republican	Don Pomeroy	21,854	46.14%
Total votes		47,367	100%
Democratic hold			

=== 2018 ===
North Carolina House of Representatives 104th district general election, 2018
Party	Candidate	Votes	%
Democratic	Brandon Lofton	21,716	51.78%
Republican	Andy Dulin (incumbent)	20,220	48.22%
Total votes		41,936	100%
Democratic gain from Republican			

North Carolina House of Representatives
Preceded by Andy Dulin	Member of the North Carolina House of Representatives from the 104th district 2019-Present	Incumbent
