= Wilson Creek (North Carolina) =

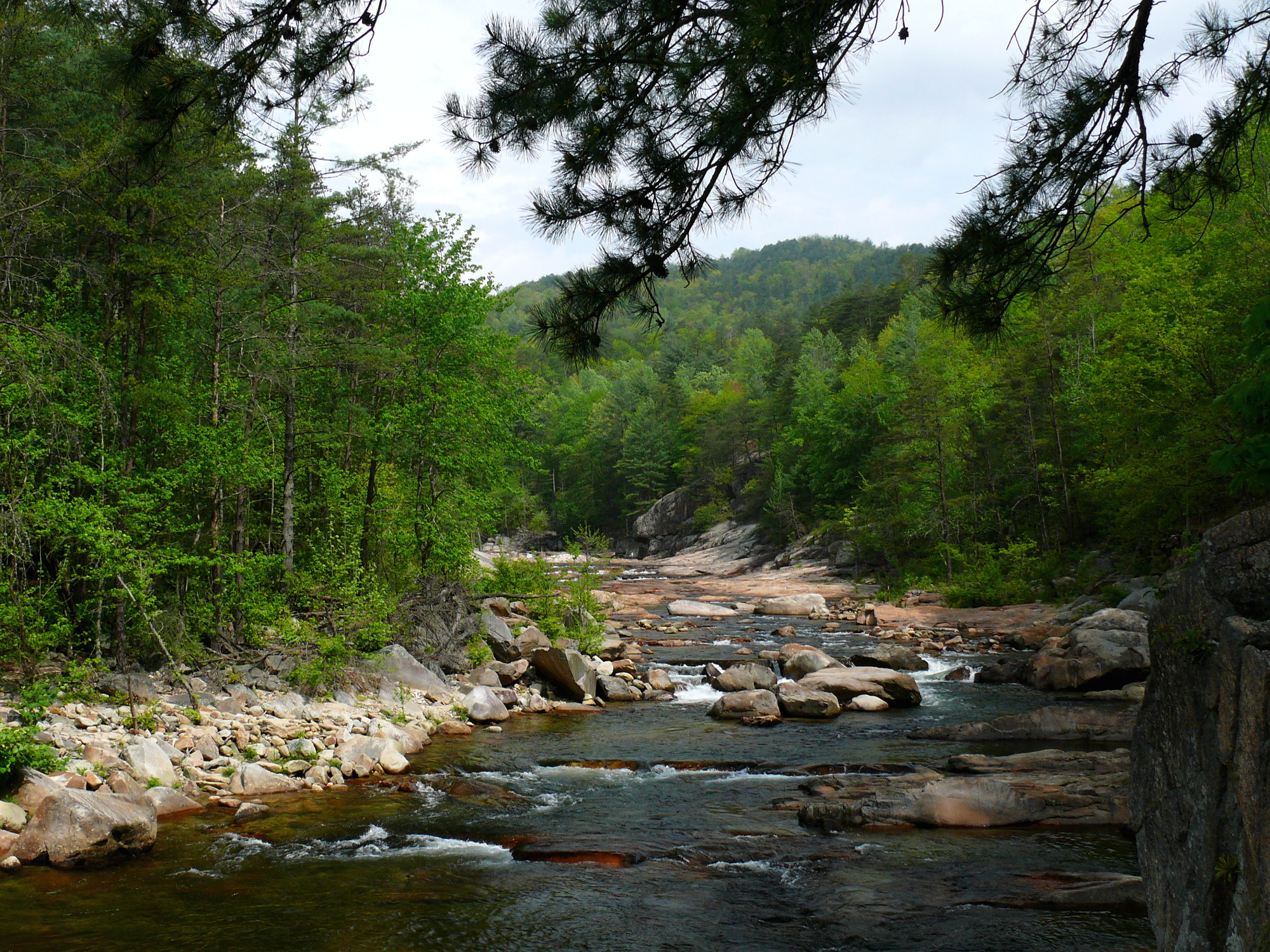
- Wilson Creek

Location
- Country: United States
- State: North Carolina

Physical characteristics
- Mouth
  - coordinates: 35.8817°N 81.7089°W

National Wild and Scenic Rivers System
- Type: Wild, scenic, recreational
- Designated: August 18, 2000

Wilson Creek is located in the Grandfather District of the Pisgah National Forest, in the northwestern section of Caldwell County, North Carolina. Wilson Creek has a water system that originates near Calloway Peak and stretches for 23 miles (37 km) before joining with John's River. It was added to the Wild and Scenic River System on August 18, 2000.

The Wilson Creek area contains places to fish, hike, camp, and mountain biking.

== History ==
The Wilson Creek Wilderness area was once used by the Cherokee Native Americans as a summer hunting ground. The area was settled in 1750, and logging began in the forest.

Mortimer, once the largest community in the Wilson Creek area, was the site of the Ritter Lumber Company sawmill. This sawmill was destroyed by a storm that produced over 20 inches (510 mm) of rain in 24 hours in July 1916. The week before, torrential rain had already saturated the ground and heavy lumbering aggravated the speed of the water rushing through the gorge. After a year, efforts to rebuild brought back the sawmill and a textile mill. The community was also served by a new railroad line.

The Mortimer community provided enough jobs to sustain around 800 residents. However, it flooded again on August 13, 1940, with Wilson Creek reaching over a 90-foot (27 m) flood stage. This event ended all efforts to bring in industry and left the area virtually deserted. The concrete shells of the old facilities are visible in a park area. Only a few residents and homes remain upstream at Edgemont, with most of the downstream area maintained for public use by the US Forestry Service.

In 1903, the Caldwell & Northern Railroad extended the line up Wilson Creek. You can still see evidence of bridge piers in some places. In addition, most of roads in the area were once actual paths that the railroads in the area used. There were two other railroads in the area, a narrow gauge railroad that Ritter Lumber used for logging and the other was the Hutton-Bourbannis Company railroad.
