= North Carolina's 104th House district =

American legislative district

North Carolina's 104th State House of Representatives district
Representative
Brandon Lofton; D–Charlotte
- Demographics: 72% White; 11% Black; 9% Hispanic; 5% Asian; 3% Multiracial
- Population (2024): 83,722

North Carolina's 104th House district is one of 120 districts in the North Carolina House of Representatives. It has been represented by Democrat Brandon Lofton since 2019.

== Geography ==
Since 2003, the district has included part of Mecklenburg County. The district overlaps with the 39th, 40th, 41st, and 42nd Senate districts.

== District officeholders ==
Representative	Party	Dates	Notes	Counties
District created January 1, 2003.				2003–Present; Part of Mecklenburg County.
Connie Wilson (Charlotte)	Republican	January 1, 2003 – January 1, 2005	Redistricted from the 57th district. Retired.	2003–Present; Part of Mecklenburg County.
Ed McMahan (Charlotte)	Republican	January 1, 2005 – January 1, 2007	Redistricted from the 105th district. Retired.	2003–Present; Part of Mecklenburg County.
Ruth Samuelson (Charlotte)	Republican	January 1, 2007 – January 1, 2015	Retired.	2003–Present; Part of Mecklenburg County.
Dan Bishop (Charlotte)	Republican	January 1, 2015 – January 1, 2017	Retired to run for State Senate.	2003–Present; Part of Mecklenburg County.
Andy Dulin (Charlotte)	Republican	January 1, 2017 – January 1, 2019	Lost re-election.	2003–Present; Part of Mecklenburg County.
Brandon Lofton (Charlotte)	Democratic	January 1, 2019 – Present		2003–Present; Part of Mecklenburg County.

== Election results ==
=== 2024 ===
North Carolina House of Representatives 104th district general election, 2024
Party	Candidate	Votes	%
Democratic	Brandon Lofton (incumbent)	27,629	55.96%
Republican	Krista Bokhari	21,748	44.04%
Total votes		49,377	100%
Democratic hold			

=== 2022 ===
North Carolina House of Representatives 104th district general election, 2022
Party	Candidate	Votes	%
Democratic	Brandon Lofton (incumbent)	21,084	55.27%
Republican	Don Pomeroy	17,061	44.73%
Total votes		38,145	100%
Democratic hold			

=== 2020 ===
North Carolina House of Representatives 104th district general election, 2020
Party	Candidate	Votes	%
Democratic	Brandon Lofton (incumbent)	25,513	53.86%
Republican	Don Pomeroy	21,854	46.14%
Total votes		47,367	100%
Democratic hold			

=== 2018 ===
North Carolina House of Representatives 104th district general election, 2018
Party	Candidate	Votes	%
Democratic	Brandon Lofton	21,716	51.78%
Republican	Andy Dulin (incumbent)	20,220	48.22%
Total votes		41,936	100%
Democratic gain from Republican			

=== 2016 ===
North Carolina House of Representatives 104th district general election, 2016
Party	Candidate	Votes	%
Republican	Andy Dulin	24,700	55.32%
Democratic	Peter Noris	19,952	44.68%
Total votes		44,652	100%
Republican hold			

=== 2014 ===
North Carolina House of Representatives 104th district general election, 2014
Party	Candidate	Votes	%
Republican	Dan Bishop	18,576	74.78%
Libertarian	Eric Cable	6,266	25.22%
Total votes		24,842	100%
Republican hold			

=== 2012 ===
North Carolina House of Representatives 104th district general election, 2012
Party	Candidate	Votes	%
Republican	Ruth Samuelson (incumbent)	31,319	100%
Total votes		31,319	100%
Republican hold			

=== 2010 ===
North Carolina House of Representatives 104th district Republican primary election, 2010
Party	Candidate	Votes	%
Republican	Ruth Samuelson (incumbent)	3,489	83.03%
Republican	Jerry Drye	713	16.97%
Total votes		4,202	100%

North Carolina House of Representatives 104th district general election, 2010
Party	Candidate	Votes	%
Republican	Ruth Samuelson (incumbent)	20,001	74.74%
Democratic	Frank Deaton	6,758	25.26%
Total votes		26,759	100%
Republican hold			

=== 2008 ===
North Carolina House of Representatives 104th district general election, 2008
Party	Candidate	Votes	%
Republican	Ruth Samuelson (incumbent)	29,349	100%
Total votes		29,349	100%
Republican hold			

=== 2006 ===
North Carolina House of Representatives 104th district general election, 2006
Party	Candidate	Votes	%
Republican	Ruth Samuelson	14,668	67.03%
Democratic	Paula McSwain	7,215	32.97%
Total votes		21,883	100%
Republican hold			

=== 2004 ===
North Carolina House of Representatives 104th district general election, 2004
Party	Candidate	Votes	%
Republican	Ed McMahan (incumbent)	26,125	100%
Total votes		26,125	100%
Republican hold			

=== 2002 ===
North Carolina House of Representatives 104th district general election, 2002
Party	Candidate	Votes	%
Republican	Connie Wilson (incumbent)	20,983	89.53%
Libertarian	Ryan Murphy	2,453	10.47%
Total votes		23,436	100%
Republican hold			
