= North Carolina's 105th House district =

American legislative district

North Carolina's 105th State House of Representatives district
Representative
Tricia Cotham; R–Mint Hill
- Demographics: 73% White; 9% Black; 7% Hispanic; 6% Asian; 4% Multiracial
- Population (2024): 84,627

North Carolina's 105th House district is one of 120 districts in the North Carolina House of Representatives. It has been represented by Republican Tricia Cotham since 2025.

== Geography ==
Since 2003, the district has included part of Mecklenburg County. The district overlaps with the 42nd Senate district.

== District officeholders ==
Representative	Party	Dates	Notes	Counties
District created January 1, 2003.				2003–Present; Part of Mecklenburg County.
Ed McMahan (Charlotte)	Republican	January 1, 2003 – January 1, 2005	Redistricted from the 55th district. Redistricted to the 104th district.	2003–Present; Part of Mecklenburg County.
Doug Vinson (Charlotte)	Republican	January 1, 2005 – January 1, 2007	Retired.	2003–Present; Part of Mecklenburg County.
Ric Killian (Charlotte)	Republican	January 1, 2007 – January 1, 2013	Retired to run for Congress.	2003–Present; Part of Mecklenburg County.
Jacqueline Schaffer (Charlotte)	Republican	January 1, 2013 – April 22, 2016	Resigned.	2003–Present; Part of Mecklenburg County.
Vacant		April 22, 2016 – May 16, 2016		2003–Present; Part of Mecklenburg County.
Scott Stone (Charlotte)	Republican	May 16, 2016 – January 1, 2019	Appointed to finish Schaffer's term Lost re-election.	2003–Present; Part of Mecklenburg County.
Wesley Harris (Charlotte)	Democratic	January 1, 2019 – January 1, 2025	Redistricted to the 103rd district and retired to run for State Treasurer.	2003–Present; Part of Mecklenburg County.
Tricia Cotham (Mint Hill)	Republican	January 1, 2025 – Present	Redistricted from the 112th district.	2003–Present; Part of Mecklenburg County.

== Election results ==
=== 2026 ===
North Carolina House of Representatives 105th district Republican primary election, 2026
Party	Candidate	Votes	%
Republican	Tricia Cotham (incumbent)	4,372	84.53%
Republican	Kelly VanHorn	800	15.47%
Total votes		5,172	100%

North Carolina House of Representatives 105th district general election, 2026
Party	Candidate	Votes	%
Republican	Tricia Cotham (incumbent)		
Democratic	Ken McCool		
Total votes			100%

=== 2024 ===
North Carolina House of Representatives 105th district Democratic primary election, 2024
Party	Candidate	Votes	%
Democratic	Nicole Sidman	3,939	57.28%
Democratic	Yolanda Holmes	2,608	37.92%
Democratic	Terry Lansdell	330	4.80%
Total votes		6,877	100%

North Carolina House of Representatives 105th district general election, 2024
Party	Candidate	Votes	%
Republican	Tricia Cotham (incumbent)	27,303	50.20%
Democratic	Nicole Sidman	27,087	49.80%
Total votes		54,390	100%
Republican hold			

(Note: Previous Incumbent Wesley Harris was redistricted to the 103rd district and chose to retire. Tricia Cotham was redistricted to this district from the 112th district.)

=== 2022 ===
North Carolina House of Representatives 105th district general election, 2022
Party	Candidate	Votes	%
Democratic	Wesley Harris (incumbent)	17,545	56.87%
Republican	Joshua Niday	13,307	43.13%
Total votes		30,852	100%
Democratic hold			

=== 2020 ===
North Carolina House of Representatives 105th district general election, 2020
Party	Candidate	Votes	%
Democratic	Wesley Harris (incumbent)	25,732	54.78%
Republican	Amy Bynum	21,245	45.22%
Total votes		46,977	100%
Democratic hold			

=== 2018 ===
North Carolina House of Representatives 105th district Democratic primary election, 2018
Party	Candidate	Votes	%
Democratic	Wesley Harris	2,244	70.48%
Democratic	Ayoub Ouederni	940	29.52%
Total votes		3,184	100%

North Carolina House of Representatives 105th district general election, 2018
Party	Candidate	Votes	%
Democratic	Wesley Harris	18,362	52.29%
Republican	Scott Stone (incumbent)	16,753	47.71%
Total votes		35,115	100%
Democratic gain from Republican			

=== 2016 ===
North Carolina House of Representatives 105th district Republican primary election, 2016
Party	Candidate	Votes	%
Republican	Scott Stone	4,680	52.18%
Republican	Tim Morgan	4,289	47.82%
Total votes		8,969	100%

North Carolina House of Representatives 105th district general election, 2016
Party	Candidate	Votes	%
Republican	Scott Stone (incumbent)	21,853	55.27%
Democratic	Connie Green-Johnson	17,689	44.73%
Total votes		39,542	100%
Republican hold			

=== 2014 ===
North Carolina House of Representatives 105th district general election, 2014
Party	Candidate	Votes	%
Republican	Jacqueline Schaffer (incumbent)	15,270	100%
Total votes		15,270	100%
Republican hold			

=== 2012 ===
North Carolina House of Representatives 105th district Republican primary election, 2012
Party	Candidate	Votes	%
Republican	Jacqueline Schaffer	4,077	57.18%
Republican	Ken Gjertsen	3,053	42.82%
Total votes		7,130	100%

North Carolina House of Representatives 105th district general election, 2012
Party	Candidate	Votes	%
Republican	Jacqueline Schaffer	27,028	100%
Total votes		27,028	100%
Republican hold			

=== 2010 ===
North Carolina House of Representatives 105th district general election, 2010
Party	Candidate	Votes	%
Republican	Ric Killian (incumbent)	22,857	100%
Total votes		22,857	100%
Republican hold			

=== 2008 ===
North Carolina House of Representatives 105th district general election, 2008
Party	Candidate	Votes	%
Republican	Ric Killian (incumbent)	35,879	100%
Total votes		35,879	100%
Republican hold			

=== 2006 ===
North Carolina House of Representatives 105th district general election, 2006
Party	Candidate	Votes	%
Republican	Ric Killian	15,343	100%
Total votes		15,343	100%
Republican hold			

=== 2004 ===
North Carolina House of Representatives 105th district Republican primary election, 2004
Party	Candidate	Votes	%
Republican	Doug Vinson	2,511	75.63%
Republican	Ken Gjertsen	809	24.37%
Total votes		3,320	100%

North Carolina House of Representatives 105th district general election, 2004
Party	Candidate	Votes	%
Republican	Doug Vinson	29,368	100%
Total votes		29,368	100%
Republican win (new seat)			

=== 2002 ===
North Carolina House of Representatives 105th district Republican primary election, 2002
Party	Candidate	Votes	%
Republican	Ed McMahan (incumbent)	3,116	73.59%
Republican	Debbie Ware	1,118	26.41%
Total votes		4,234	100%

North Carolina House of Representatives 105th district general election, 2002
Party	Candidate	Votes	%
Republican	Ed McMahan (incumbent)	17,970	89.78%
Libertarian	Sean Johnson	2,046	10.22%
Total votes		20,016	100%
Republican hold			
