= W. Edwin McMahan =

American politician

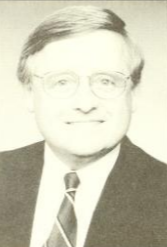
McMahan in the 2001 legislative manual

William Edwin McMahan (born August 13, 1944) was a Republican member of the North Carolina General Assembly representing the state's one hundred fifth House district, including constituents in Mecklenburg county. A businessman from Charlotte, North Carolina, McMahan served as a major fundraiser for President George W. Bush in both the 2000 and 2004 election cycles.

In 2008, McMahan stepped down from his position as an RNC national committeeman, to assist Charlotte Mayor Pat McCrory's bid to become North Carolina Governor. Pat McCrory won the Republican primary election, but was defeated in the general election by Lieutenant Governor Bev Perdue.

He has a B.S. in Industrial Relations from the University of North Carolina, Chapel Hill.

North Carolina House of Representatives
Preceded by David Gregory Balmer	Member of the North Carolina House of Representatives from the 55th district 1995–2003	Succeeded by Gordon Allen
Preceded by Constituency established	Member of the North Carolina House of Representatives from the 105th district 2003–2005	Succeeded by Doug Vinson
Preceded by Connie Wilson	Member of the North Carolina House of Representatives from the 104th district 2005–2007	Succeeded by Ruth Samuelson
