= Brad Briner =

American politician (born 1970s)

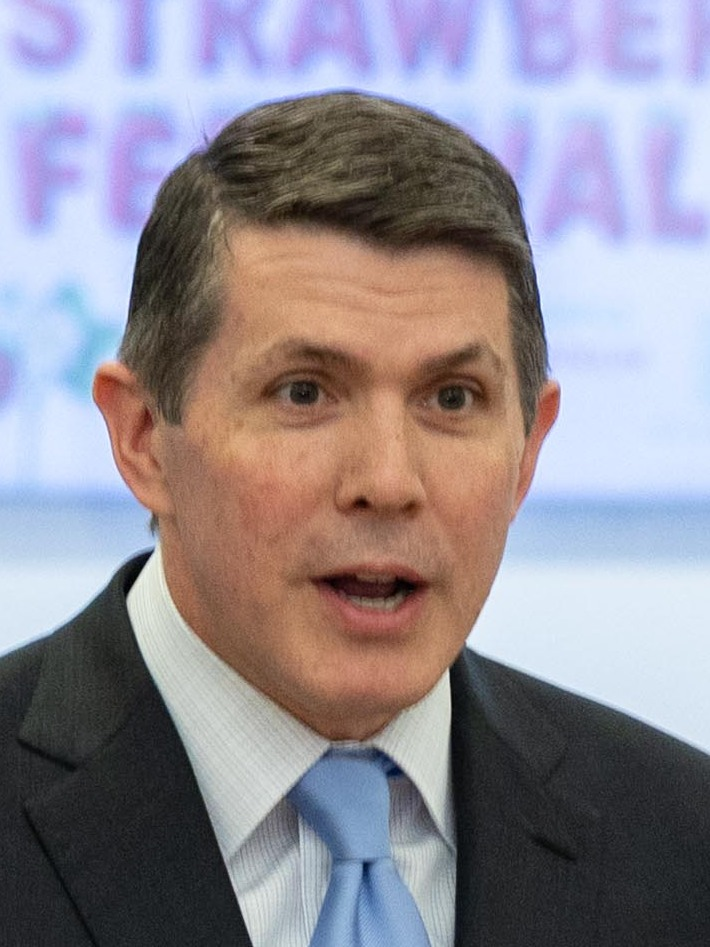
- Briner in 2025

Treasurer of North Carolina
- Incumbent
- Assumed office January 1, 2025
- Governor: Josh Stein
- Preceded by: Dale Folwell

Personal details
- Born: 1976 or 1977 (age 49–50) Dallas, Texas, U.S.
- Party: Republican
- Education: University of North Carolina, Chapel Hill (BA); Harvard University (MBA)

Bradford B. Briner (born 1976/1977) is an American politician from North Carolina. He is the North Carolina State Treasurer. He is a Republican.

Briner was born in Dallas, Texas. He graduated from Phillips Exeter Academy, the University of North Carolina at Chapel Hill and Harvard Business School. In March 2017, Briner and Andrew Mulderry were named co-chief investment officers of Willett Advisors, Michael Bloomberg's investment fund.

With Dale Folwell not running for reelection as state treasurer in the 2024 election, Briner won the Republican nomination, defeating former North Carolina Education Lottery commissioner A.J. Daoud and Rachel Johnson. He defeated Wesley Harris in the general election. He assumed office on January 1, 2025.

Political offices
Preceded by Dale Folwell	Treasurer of North Carolina; 2025–present	Incumbent
