= South Caldwell High School =

American public school in North Carolina

Location
- 7035 Spartan Drive; Hudson, North Carolina 28630; United States; 35°49′17″N 81°27′02″W

Information
- School type: Public
- Established: 1977 (49 years ago)
- School district: Caldwell County Schools
- CEEB code: 341915
- Principal: Dr. Jason Attig
- Staff: 66.67 (FTE)
- Grades: 9–12
- Enrollment: 1,272 (2024-2025)
- Student to teacher ratio: 19.08
- Colors: Maroon, silver, and white
- Mascot: Spartan
- Team name: Spartans
- Feeder schools: Granite Falls Middle School, Hudson Middle School
- Website: schs.caldwellschools.com

South Caldwell High School (SCHS) is a public high school in Hudson, North Carolina. It is a part of the Caldwell County Schools district.

== History ==
The construction of South Caldwell High School was completed on August 25, 1977. SCHS is located on a 100-acre (0.40 km^{2}) site in Caldwell County, between Hudson and Granite Falls. Granite Falls Middle School and Hudson Middle School feed into South Caldwell.

== Academics ==
The school provides an academic program ranging from courses for students having special needs, to standard courses, or honors and Advanced Placement (AP) courses. Student needs are enriched through a comprehensive program centering in the basic subjects of English, math, social studies and science, with tutoring provided free of charge before and after school. Individual assistance is provided for each student in the completion of a career pathway.

Block scheduling is used with two nine-weeks grading periods per semester. Grade point average and class rank are computed using the state-weighted scale at the end of each semester. The cumulative average is based on four years, beginning with the ninth grade. Starting with the 2015–2016 school year a new grading scale was put into effect with A= 100–90, B= 89–80, C= 79–70, D= 69–60, F= 59 and below.

South Caldwell High School is approved and accredited by the North Carolina Department of Public Instruction and the Southern Association of Colleges and Schools.

== Media and technology ==
The media center is an integral part of the academic atmosphere of the school. The facility houses over 17,000 volumes supplementing all subject areas. Students have flexible access to the media center resources and its thirty networked computers that access the electronic reference databases and the internet. A thirty computer lab for activities such as word processing, creating presentations, webquests, and Internet research. An additional thirty computer lab utilizes the Passkey software to support and enhance the standard course of study. Additionally the school is a 1:1 school, providing laptops to any students that are in need of one.

== Athletics ==
South Caldwell is a member of the North Carolina High School Athletic Association (NCHSAA) and are classified as a 6A school. The school is a part of the Northwestern 6A/7A Conference. South Caldwell's school colors are maroon, silver, and white, and its team name is the Spartans. Sports at South Caldwell include:

- Baseball
- Basketball
- Competition Cheerleading
- Cross Country
- Football
- Golf
- Marching Band
- Soccer
- Softball
- Swimming
- Tennis
- Indoor/Outdoor Track & Field
- Volleyball
- Wrestling

== Notable alumni ==
- Madison Bumgarner, MLB pitcher, 4x All-Star selection, 3x World Series champion and 2014 World Series MVP with the San Francisco Giants
- Eric Church, country music singer-songwriter
- Landon Dickerson, NFL offensive lineman, 3x Pro Bowl selection, Super Bowl LIX champion with the Philadelphia Eagles
- Donnie Kirkpatrick, college football coach
