= Cajah's Mountain, North Carolina =

Town in Caldwell County, North Carolina, United States

- Town
- Seal
- Interactive map of Cajah's Mountain, North Carolina
- Coordinates: 35°51′01.6″N 81°32′16.2″W
- Country: United States
- State: North Carolina
- County: Caldwell

Population (2020)
  - Total: 2,722
- Time zone: UTC-5 (Eastern (EST))
  - Summer (DST): UTC-4 (EDT)
- Area code: 828
- Website: www.cajahsmtn.com

Cajah's Mountain is a town in Caldwell County, North Carolina, United States. As of the 2020 census, Cajah's Mountain had a population of 2,722. It is part of the Hickory–Lenoir–Morganton Metropolitan Statistical Area.

== History ==
Cajah's Mountain was incorporated as a town in 1983.

== Geography ==
Cajah's Mountain is located in southern Caldwell County. It is bordered to the north by Lenoir, the county seat. Cajah Mountain's highest elevation 1,530 feet (470 m), is at the southern end of the town next to Connelly Springs Road, the major north–south road through the town.

According to the United States Census Bureau, the town has a total area of 3.4 square miles (8.8 km^{2}), all land.

== Demographics ==
Historical population
Census	Pop.	Note	%±
1990	2,429		—
2000	2,683		10.5%
2010	2,823		5.2%
2020	2,722		−3.6%
U.S. Decennial Census

=== 2020 census ===
As of the 2020 census, Cajah's Mountain had a population of 2,722. The median age was 48.9 years. 17.9% of residents were under the age of 18, and 26.0% were 65 years of age or older. For every 100 females, there were 87.3 males, and for every 100 females age 18 and over, there were 88.1 males age 18 and over.

100.0% of residents lived in urban areas, while 0.0% lived in rural areas.

There were 1,110 households in Cajah's Mountain, of which 26.9% had children under the age of 18 living in them. Of all households, 52.4% were married-couple households, 16.2% were households with a male householder and no spouse or partner present, and 25.9% were households with a female householder and no spouse or partner present. About 26.8% of all households were made up of individuals, and 13.7% had someone living alone who was 65 years of age or older.

There were 1,196 housing units, of which 7.2% were vacant. The homeowner vacancy rate was 1.5%, and the rental vacancy rate was 7.4%.

Cajah's Mountain racial composition
Race	Number	Percentage
White (non-Hispanic)	2,428	89.2%
Black or African American (non-Hispanic)	51	1.87%
Native American	16	0.59%
Asian	15	0.55%
Other/Mixed	100	3.67%
Hispanic or Latino	112	4.11%

=== 2000 census ===
As of the census of 2000, there were 2,683 people, 996 households, and 726 families residing in the town. The population density was 877.4 inhabitants per square mile (338.8/km^{2}). There were 1,043 housing units at an average density of 341.1 per square mile (131.7/km^{2}). The racial makeup of the town was 95.19% White, 3.17% African American, 0.19% Native American, 0.56% Asian, 0.52% from other races, and 0.37% from two or more races. Hispanic or Latino of any race were 0.93% of the population.

There were 996 households, out of which 27.9% had children under the age of 18 living with them, 61.9% were married couples living together, 7.1% had a female householder with no husband present, and 27.1% were non-families. 23.5% of all households were made up of individuals, and 10.4% had someone living alone who was 65 years of age or older. The average household size was 2.38 and the average family size was 2.79.

In the town, the population was spread out, with 18.3% under the age of 18, 7.0% from 18 to 24, 32.5% from 25 to 44, 24.8% from 45 to 64, and 17.4% who were 65 years of age or older. The median age was 40 years. For every 100 females, there were 103.9 males. For every 100 females age 18 and over, there were 105.7 males.

The median income for a household in the town was $39,566, and the median income for a family was $43,462. Males had a median income of $31,156 versus $21,168 for females. The per capita income for the town was $17,909. About 8.8% of families and 11.2% of the population were below the poverty line, including 16.9% of those under age 18 and 10.4% of those age 65 or over.
