= Ruth Samuelson =

American politician from North Carolina (1959–2017

Representative Ruth Samuelson
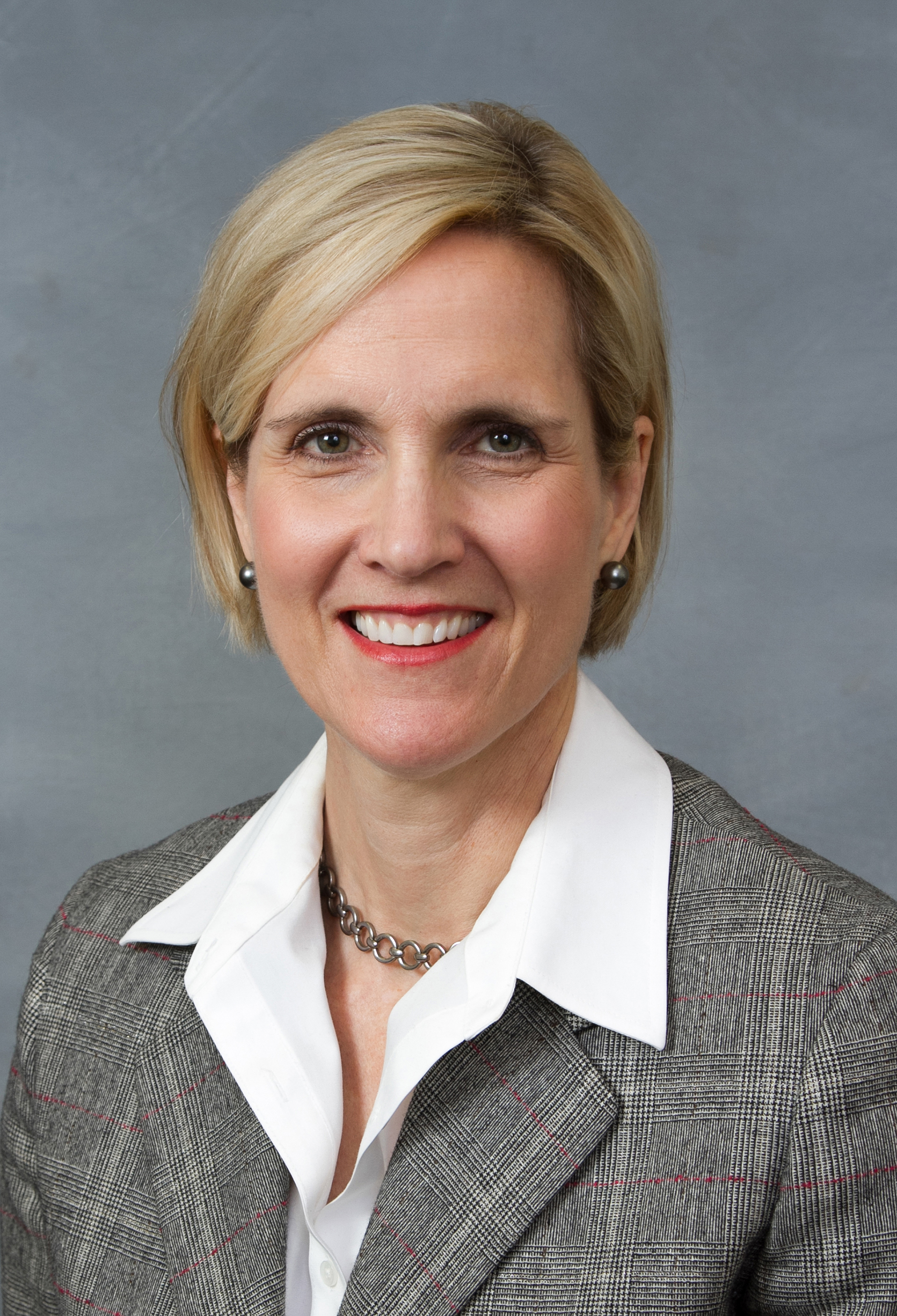

Member of the North Carolina House of Representatives from the 104th district
- In office January 1, 2007 – January 1, 2015
- Preceded by: Ed McMahan
- Succeeded by: Dan Bishop

Member of the Mecklenburg County Board of Commissioners from the 5th district
- In office 2000–2004
- Preceded by: Tom Cox
- Succeeded by: Dan Bishop

Personal details
- Born: Ruth Culbertson; November 4, 1959 Charleston, South Carolina
- Died: January 23, 2017 (aged 57) Charlotte, North Carolina
- Party: Republican
- Spouse: Ken Samuelson
- Children: Three sons, one daughter
- Education: University of North Carolina at Chapel Hill

Ruth Culbertson Samuelson (November 4, 1959 – January 23, 2017) was a Republican member of the North Carolina General Assembly, representing the 104th district in the North Carolina House of Representatives from 2007 to 2015. From 2000 to 2004, Samuelson served as a member of the Mecklenburg County Board of Commissioners, representing the Fifth District. In 2004, she ran for an At-Large seat on the Board of Commissioners, but lost in a tight general election race.

In November 2006, Samuelson was elected to the North Carolina House succeeding five-term incumbent Ed McMahan. Samuelson was elected with 67% of the vote in the election, beating Democrat Paula McSwain.

She announced on October 15, 2013, that she would not seek re-election for a fifth term and would leave office at the end of her term, after the 2014 elections.

Samuelson revealed in June 2016 that she had been diagnosed with ovarian cancer. Later that year she entered hospice care at home.

Samuelson died on January 23, 2017, at the age of 57. A hiking trail in Mecklenburg County has been named in Samuelson's honor.

== Electoral history ==
=== 2012 ===
North Carolina House of Representatives 104th district general election, 2012
Party	Candidate	Votes	%
Republican	Ruth Samuelson (incumbent)	31,319	100%
Total votes		31,319	100%
Republican hold			

=== 2010 ===
North Carolina House of Representatives 104th district Republican primary election, 2010
Party	Candidate	Votes	%
Republican	Ruth Samuelson (incumbent)	3,489	83.03%
Republican	Jerry Drye	713	16.97%
Total votes		4,202	100%

North Carolina House of Representatives 104th district general election, 2010
Party	Candidate	Votes	%
Republican	Ruth Samuelson (incumbent)	20,001	74.74%
Democratic	Frank Deaton	6,758	25.26%
Total votes		26,759	100%
Republican hold			

=== 2008 ===
North Carolina House of Representatives 104th district general election, 2008
Party	Candidate	Votes	%
Republican	Ruth Samuelson (incumbent)	29,349	100%
Total votes		29,349	100%
Republican hold			

=== 2006 ===
North Carolina House of Representatives 104th district general election, 2006
Party	Candidate	Votes	%
Republican	Ruth Samuelson	14,668	67.03%
Democratic	Paula McSwain	7,215	32.97%
Total votes		21,883	100%
Republican hold			

Political offices
Preceded by Tom Cox	Member of the Mecklenburg County Board of Commissioners from the 5th district 2000–2004	Succeeded by Dan Bishop
North Carolina House of Representatives
Preceded by Ed McMahan	Member of the North Carolina House of Representatives from the 104th district 2007–2015	Succeeded by Dan Bishop
