= Ric Killian =

American politician

Member of the North Carolina House of Representatives from the 105th district
- In office January 1, 2007 – January 1, 2013
- Preceded by: Doug Vinson
- Succeeded by: Jacqueline Schaffer

Personal details
- Born: Richard Daniel Killian; July 17, 1964 (age 62) Kaukauna, Wisconsin
- Party: Republican
- Education: US Army War College, United States Military Academy at West Point
- Occupation: State Legislator

Military service
- Allegiance: United States of America
- Branch/service: United States Army, United States Army Reserve
- Years of service: 1986–1991 Active Duty, 1991–present Army Reserve
- Rank: Colonel
- Unit: Office of the Secretary of Defense
- Battles/wars: Operation Iraqi Freedom; Operation Enduring Freedom

Richard Daniel "Ric" Killian is an American businessman, United States Army officer, and politician who served as a member of the North Carolina House of Representatives from 2007 to 2013.

== Early life, education, and business career ==
Killian was born in Kaukauna, Wisconsin, in 1964. He was also raised there. In 1986, he earned a BS in organizational leadership from the United States Military Academy at West Point. He was a lieutenant/captain of the United States Army from 1986 to 1991. After that, he retired and has been a colonel in the U.S. Army Reserve since.

After retiring from the U.S. Army, Killian went into real estate. In 1995, he was named president of Howey Construction & Development and served until that position until 2000. He was then general manager of NVR until 2003. After that, he was vice president of Orleans Home builders until he was appointed to the North Carolina House of Representatives in 2006.

== Early political career ==
In 1992, he was elected to the Kaukauna Area School District Board of Education and served one term. In 2004, he decided to run again to become a school board member, this time on the Mecklenburg Area Catholic School Board of Education.

== North Carolina House of Representatives ==
=== Committee assignments ===
- House Committee on Appropriations (Vice Chair)
- House Committee on Education
- House Committee on Elections
- House Committee on Environment and Natural Resources
- House Committee on Homeland Security, Military and Veterans Affairs (chair)
- House Committee on Judiciary
- House Committee on Military and Homeland Security (chair)
- House Committee on Redistricting
- House Committee on Transportation
  - House Subcommittee A (Judiciary)
  - House Subcommittee on Capital
  - House Subcommittee on Transportation (chair)

=== Electoral history ===
In August 2006, incumbent Republican State Representative Doug Vinson, of North Carolina's 105th House District, decided not to run for a 2nd term. He was elected to the seat as a Republican unopposed. He won re-election unopposed in 2008 and 2010. He left office in 2013.

==== 2010 ====
North Carolina House of Representatives 105th district general election, 2010
Party	Candidate	Votes	%
Republican	Ric Killian (incumbent)	22,857	100%
Total votes		22,857	100%
Republican hold			

==== 2008 ====
North Carolina House of Representatives 105th district general election, 2008
Party	Candidate	Votes	%
Republican	Ric Killian (incumbent)	35,879	100%
Total votes		35,879	100%
Republican hold			

==== 2006 ====
North Carolina House of Representatives 105th district general election, 2006
Party	Candidate	Votes	%
Republican	Ric Killian	15,343	100%
Total votes		15,343	100%
Republican hold			

== 2012 congressional election ==
After redistricting, Killian decided to retire from the state legislature to run for the newly redrawn North Carolina's 9th congressional district. He said "[Incumbent Sue Myrick] fought against runaway spending, and she always provided excellent service to her constituents, and that will continue if I am elected." U.S. Senator and 2008 Republican presidential nominee John McCain (R-AZ) endorsed Killian during the Republican primary in March 2012. Killian did not receive the nomination, which was won by Robert Pittenger.

United States House of Representatives North Carolina's 9th congressional district Republican primary election, 2012
Party	Candidate	Votes	%
Republican	Robert Pittenger	29,999	32.45%
Republican	Jim Pendergraph	23,401	25.31%
Republican	Edwin Peacock III	11,336	12.26%
Republican	Ric Killian	9,691	10.48%
Republican	Dan Barry	5,515	5.97%
Republican	Andy Dulin	4,526	4.90%
Republican	Mike Steinberg	2,297	2.48%
Republican	Jon Gauthier	2,056	2.22%
Republican	Ken Leonczyk	2,047	2.21%
Republican	Richard Lynch	1,000	1.08%
Republican	Michael Shaffer (withdrew)	579	0.63%
Total votes		92,447	100%

== Personal life ==
Ric married Debbi in 1991 and had four children. They are members of St. Matthew Catholic Church.

North Carolina House of Representatives
Preceded by Doug Vinson	Member of the North Carolina House of Representatives from the 105th district 2007–2013	Succeeded by Jacqueline Schaffer
