= Scott Stone =

American politician and engineer from North Carolina

Member of the North Carolina House of Representatives from the 105th district
- In office May 16, 2016 – January 1, 2019
- Preceded by: Jacqueline Schaffer
- Succeeded by: Wesley Harris

Personal details
- Party: Republican
- Children: 2
- Education: Clarkson University (BS); Marymount University (MBA)
- Profession: Engineer, politician

Scott Stone is an American politician and engineer who served as a Republican member of the North Carolina House of Representatives for the 105th from May 16, 2016, through the end of 2018.

== Education ==
Stone graduated Clarkson University with a bachelor's degree in Civil and Environmental Engineering. He received a Master's in Business Administration (MBA) from Marymount University School of Business Administration.

== Career ==
As member of the North Carolina House of Representatives, Stone represented House District 105 in the North Carolina General Assembly. Stone served the remainder of a term in 2016 after being appointed by Gov. Pat McCrory to fill a vacancy and served a full term during the 2017–2018 biennium session. He lost his re-election bid in 2018 to Wesley Harris.

In May 2020, during the COVID-19 pandemic, Stone attacked the Pottery Barn chain on Twitter for closing its store at a local mall two hours before the mall's closing time. After many critical replies, Stone deleted the tweet and took his account private.

== Electoral history ==
=== 2022 ===
North Carolina Senate 42nd district Republican primary election, 2022
Party	Candidate	Votes	%
Republican	Cheryl Russo	6,775	50.51%
Republican	Scott Stone	6,638	49.49%
Total votes		13,413	100%

=== 2020 ===
North Carolina Lieutenant gubernatorial Republican primary election, 2020
Party	Candidate	Votes	%
Republican	Mark Robinson	240,843	32.52%
Republican	Andy Wells	107,824	14.56%
Republican	Mark Johnson	89,200	12.04%
Republican	John L. Ritter	85,023	11.48%
Republican	Renee Ellmers	50,526	6.82%
Republican	Greg Gebhardt	50,474	6.81%
Republican	Deborah Cochran	48,234	6.51%
Republican	Scott Stone	48,193	6.51%
Republican	Buddy Bengel	20,395	2.75%
Total votes		740,712	100%

=== 2018 ===
North Carolina House of Representatives 105th district general election, 2018
Party	Candidate	Votes	%
Democratic	Wesley Harris	18,362	52.29%
Republican	Scott Stone (incumbent)	16,753	47.71%
Total votes		35,115	100%
Democratic gain from Republican			

=== 2016 ===
North Carolina House of Representatives 105th district Republican primary election, 2016
Party	Candidate	Votes	%
Republican	Scott Stone	4,680	52.18%
Republican	Tim Morgan	4,289	47.82%
Total votes		8,969	100%

North Carolina House of Representatives 105th district general election, 2016
Party	Candidate	Votes	%
Republican	Scott Stone (incumbent)	21,853	55.27%
Democratic	Connie Green-Johnson	17,689	44.73%
Total votes		39,542	100%
Republican hold			

=== 2015 ===
Charlotte mayoral Republican primary election, 2015
Party	Candidate	Votes	%
Republican	Edwin Peacock III	8,357	66.15%
Republican	Scott Stone	4,277	33.85%
Total votes		12,634	100%

=== 2011 ===
Charlotte mayoral general election, 2011
Party	Candidate	Votes	%
Democratic	Anthony Foxx	56,252	67.54%
Republican	Scott Stone	26,985	32.40%
Write-in		51	0.06%
Total votes		83,288	100%
Democratic hold			

North Carolina House of Representatives
Preceded by Jacqueline Schaffer	Member of the North Carolina House of Representatives from the 105th district 2016–2019	Succeeded by Wesley Harris
