= Caldwell County, North Carolina =

County in North Carolina, United States

- County
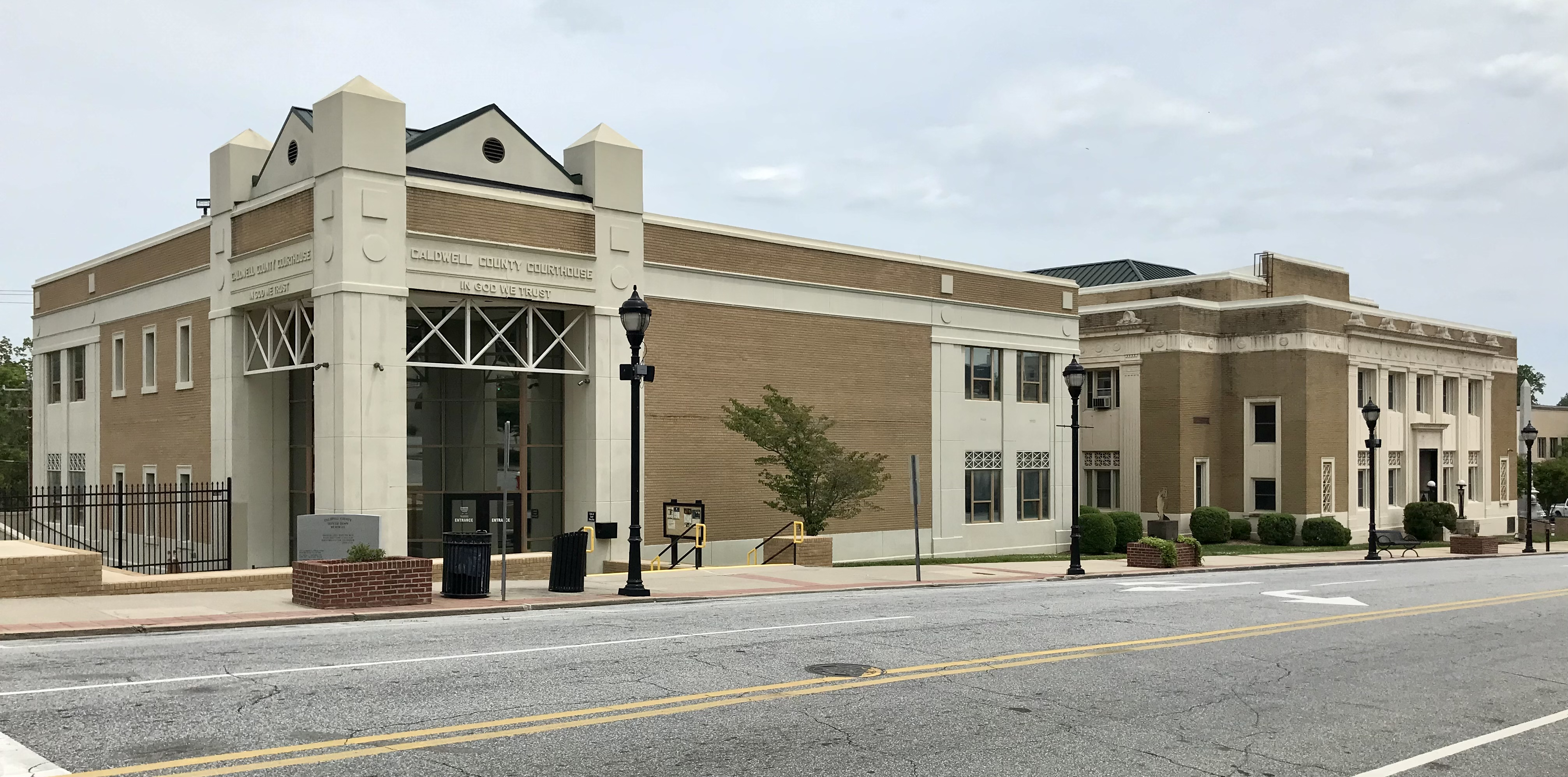
- Caldwell County Courthouse in Lenoir

- Flag Seal Logo
- Nickname: The Gateway to the Blue Ridge
- Location within the U.S. state of North Carolina
- Interactive map of Caldwell County, North Carolina
- Coordinates: 35.97°N 81.51°W
- Country: United States
- State: North Carolina
- Founded: 1841
- Named for: Joseph Caldwell
- Seat: Lenoir
- Largest community: Lenoir

Area
  - Total: 474.61 sq mi (1,229.2 km^{2})
  - Land: 471.89 sq mi (1,222.2 km^{2})
  - Water: 2.72 sq mi (7.0 km^{2}) 0.57%

Population (2020)
  - Total: 80,652
  - Estimate (2025): 81,105 ▲
  - Density: 170.91/sq mi (65.99/km^{2})
- Time zone: UTC−5 (Eastern)
  - Summer (DST): UTC−4 (EDT)
- Area code: 828
- Congressional district: 5th
- Website: www.caldwellcountync.org

Caldwell County is a county in the U.S. state of North Carolina. It is located in the foothills of the Blue Ridge Mountains. As of the 2020 census, the population was 80,652. Its county seat is Lenoir. Caldwell County is part of the Hickory-Lenoir-Morganton, NC Metropolitan Statistical Area.

== History ==
The county was formed in 1841 from parts of Burke County and Wilkes County. It was named for Joseph Caldwell, presiding professor and the first president of the University of North Carolina at Chapel Hill.

A series of reductions to the county's territory have taken place since its initial formation. In 1847, parts of Caldwell County, Iredell County, and Wilkes County were combined to form Alexander County. In 1849, parts of Caldwell County, Ashe County, Wilkes County, and Yancey County were combined to form Watauga County. In 1861, parts of Caldwell County, Burke County, McDowell County, Watauga County, and Yancey County were combined to form Mitchell County. Finally, in 1911 parts of Caldwell County, Mitchell County, and Watauga County were combined to form Avery County.

== Geography ==
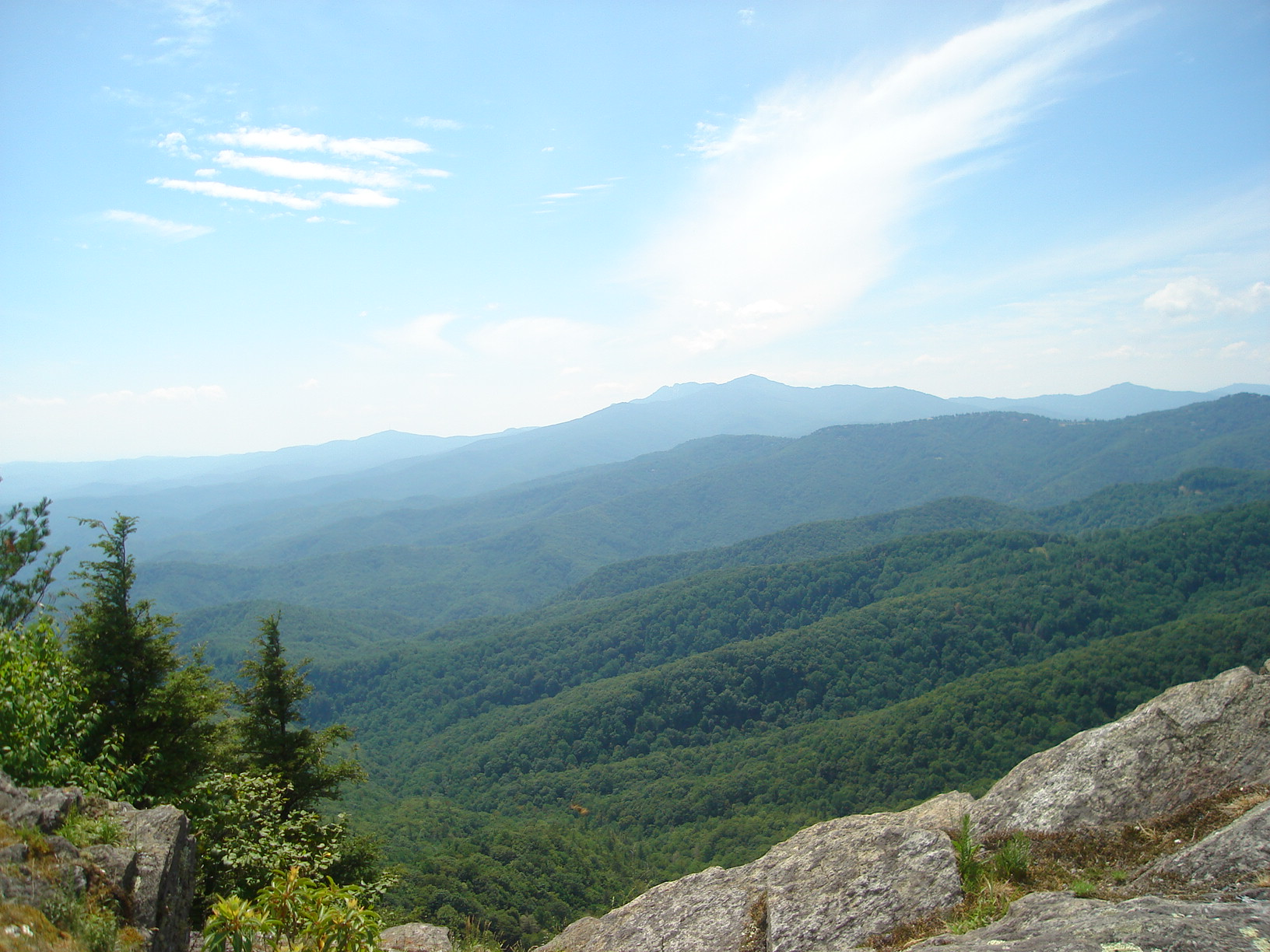
The rocky outcropping of Blowing Rock in the town of Blowing Rock, North Carolina.

According to the U.S. Census Bureau, the county has a total area of 474.61 square miles (1,229.2 km^{2}), of which 471.89 square miles (1,222.2 km^{2}) is land and 2.72 square miles (7.0 km^{2}) (0.57%) is water.

Caldwell County is divided into three distinct geographic sections: the Blue Ridge Mountains, which dominate the northern and western parts of the county; the gently rolling Piedmont country in the middle and southern parts of the county; and the Brushy Mountains, an isolated remnant of the Blue Ridge Mountains. The "Brushies", as they are often called, run across much of Caldwell County's eastern section. Hibriten Mountain, located within the city limits of Lenoir, the county's largest city, marks the western end of the Brushy Mountain range. In the western part of the county is the Wilson Creek area.

=== National protected areas ===
- Blue Ridge Parkway (part)
- Pisgah National Forest (part)

=== State and local protected areas ===
- Backbone Ridge State Forest
- Buffalo Cove Game Land (part)
- Grandfather Mountain State Park (part)
- Pisgah National Forest Game Land (part)
- Pisgah (WRC) Game Land (part)
- Tuttle Educational State Forest

=== Major water bodies ===
- Beaver Creek
- Blue Creek
- Catawba River
- Gunpowder Creek
- Husband Creek
- Johns River
- Lake Hickory
- Little Gunpowder Creek
- Little King Creek
- Lower Creek
- Mill Creek
- Mulberry Creek
- Rhodhiss Lake
- Rock Creek
- Silver Creek
- Upper Little River
- Wilson Creek
- Yadkin River

=== Adjacent counties ===
- Watauga County – north
- Wilkes County – northeast
- Alexander County – east
- Catawba County – southeast
- Burke County – south
- Avery County – west

=== Major highways ===
- US 64
- US 221
- US 321, busiest highway in the county with an annual average daily traffic count of 39,000 in 2014.
- US 321A
- NC 18
- NC 90
- NC 268

=== Major infrastructure ===
- Caldwell County has one railroad, the Caldwell County Railroad which interchanges with the Norfolk Southern Railway in Hickory
- Foothills Regional Airport (partially in Burke County)

== Demographics ==
Historical population
| Census | Pop. | Note | %± |
|---|---|---|---|
| 1850 | 6,317 | | — |
| 1860 | 7,497 | | 18.7% |
| 1870 | 8,476 | | 13.1% |
| 1880 | 10,291 | | 21.4% |
| 1890 | 12,298 | | 19.5% |
| 1900 | 15,694 | | 27.6% |
| 1910 | 20,579 | | 31.1% |
| 1920 | 19,984 | | −2.9% |
| 1930 | 28,016 | | 40.2% |
| 1940 | 35,795 | | 27.8% |
| 1950 | 43,352 | | 21.1% |
| 1960 | 49,552 | | 14.3% |
| 1970 | 56,699 | | 14.4% |
| 1980 | 67,746 | | 19.5% |
| 1990 | 70,709 | | 4.4% |
| 2000 | 77,415 | | 9.5% |
| 2010 | 83,029 | | 7.3% |
| 2020 | 80,652 | | −2.9% |
| 2025 (est.) | 81,105 | ▲ | 0.6% |
U.S. Decennial Census; 1790–1960 1900–1990; 1990–2000 2010 2020

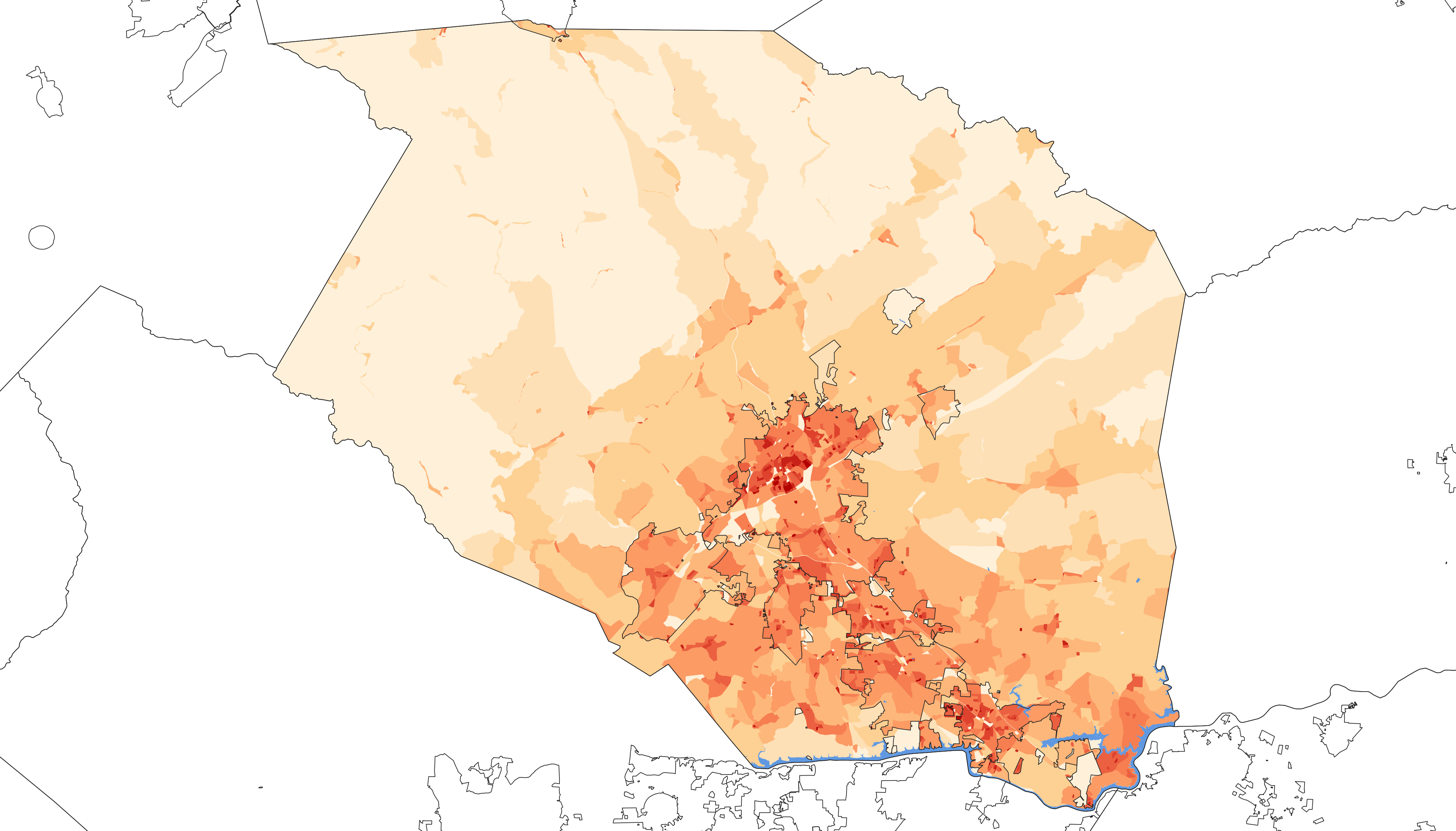
2020 population density of Caldwell County NC by census block

=== Racial and ethnic composition ===
Caldwell County, North Carolina – Racial and ethnic composition Note: the US Census treats Hispanic/Latino as an ethnic category. This table excludes Latinos from the racial categories and assigns them to a separate category. Hispanics/Latinos may be of any race.
| Race / Ethnicity (NH = Non-Hispanic) | Pop 1980 | Pop 1990 | Pop 2000 | Pop 2010 | Pop 2020 | % 1980 | % 1990 | % 2000 | % 2010 | % 2020 |
|---|---|---|---|---|---|---|---|---|---|---|
| White alone (NH) | 63,505 | 66,322 | 70,307 | 73,565 | 67,868 | 93.74% | 93.80% | 90.82% | 88.60% | 84.15% |
| Black or African American alone (NH) | 3,856 | 3,864 | 4,201 | 4,025 | 3,843 | 5.69% | 5.46% | 5.43% | 4.85% | 4.76% |
| Native American or Alaska Native alone (NH) | 48 | 98 | 147 | 159 | 196 | 0.07% | 0.14% | 0.19% | 0.19% | 0.24% |
| Asian alone (NH) | 53 | 105 | 301 | 421 | 527 | 0.08% | 0.15% | 0.39% | 0.51% | 0.65% |
| Native Hawaiian or Pacific Islander alone (NH) | x | x | 16 | 16 | 15 | x | x | 0.02% | 0.02% | 0.02% |
| Other race alone (NH) | 19 | 5 | 62 | 70 | 238 | 0.03% | 0.01% | 0.08% | 0.08% | 0.30% |
| Mixed race or Multiracial (NH) | x | x | 454 | 977 | 3,042 | x | x | 0.59% | 1.18% | 3.77% |
| Hispanic or Latino (any race) | 265 | 315 | 1,927 | 3,796 | 4,923 | 0.39% | 0.45% | 2.49% | 4.57% | 6.10% |
| Total | 67,746 | 70,709 | 77,415 | 83,029 | 80,652 | 100.00% | 100.00% | 100.00% | 100.00% | 100.00% |

=== 2020 census ===
As of the 2020 census, there were 80,652 people, 33,166 households, and 20,975 families residing in the county.

The median age was 45.1 years. 20.1% of residents were under the age of 18 and 20.9% of residents were 65 years of age or older. For every 100 females there were 97.1 males, and for every 100 females age 18 and over there were 95.7 males age 18 and over.

There were 33,166 households in the county, of which 27.7% had children under the age of 18 living in them. Of all households, 48.1% were married-couple households, 18.4% were households with a male householder and no spouse or partner present, and 26.6% were households with a female householder and no spouse or partner present. About 27.9% of all households were made up of individuals and 13.6% had someone living alone who was 65 years of age or older.

There were 36,931 housing units, of which 10.2% were vacant. Among occupied housing units, 71.3% were owner-occupied and 28.7% were renter-occupied. The homeowner vacancy rate was 1.5% and the rental vacancy rate was 6.1%.

57.2% of residents lived in urban areas, while 42.8% lived in rural areas.

The racial makeup of the county was 85.4% White, 4.9% Black or African American, 0.4% American Indian and Alaska Native, 0.7% Asian, <0.1% Native Hawaiian and Pacific Islander, 3.1% from some other race, and 5.5% from two or more races. Hispanic or Latino residents of any race comprised 6.1% of the population.

=== 2010 census ===
At the 2010 census, there were 83,029 people, 33,388 households, and 23,456 families residing in the county. The population density was 176.1 people per square mile (68.0 people/km^{2}). There were 37,659 housing units at an average density of 79.9 units per square mile (30.8 units/km^{2}). The racial makeup of the county was 90.24% White, 4.92% Black or African American, 0.52% Asian, 0.31% Native American, 0.03% Pacific Islander, 2.47% from other races, and 1.51% from two or more races. The Hispanic or Latino (of any race) population was 4.57%.

There were 33,388 households, of which 32.40% had children under the age of 18 living with them, 52.16% were married couples living together, 12.52% had a female householder with no husband present, and 29.75% were non-families. 25.39% of all households were made up of individuals living alone, and 41.16% of those households had someone living alone who was 65 years of age or older. The average household size was 2.46 and the average family size was 2.91.

Of the county's entire population, 22.63% was under the age of 18, 18.33% were 18 to 34, 22.44% were 35 to 49, 21.17% were 50 to 64, and 15.44% were 65 years of age or older. The median age was 41.3 years. For every 100 females there were 96.84 males. For every 100 females age 18 and over, there were 95.06 males.

The median income for a household in the county was $34,853, and the median income for a family was $47,028. Males had a median income of $36,429 versus $31,221 for females. The per capita income for the county was $19,397. About 15.3% of families and 20.50% of the population were below the poverty line, including 51.8% of single mothers and 13.2% of people age 65 or over.

== Government and politics ==
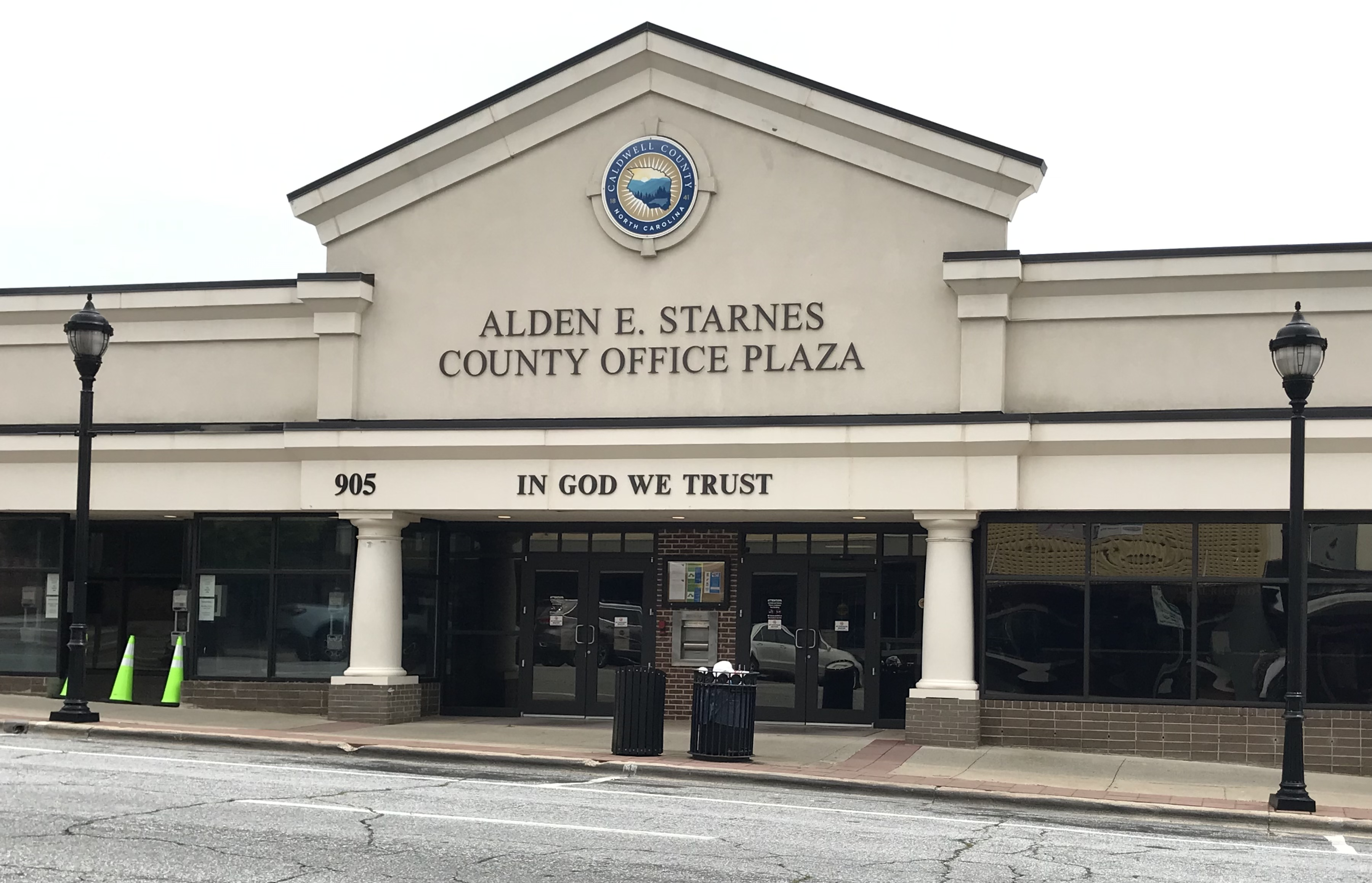
County government offices in Lenoir

The county is governed by a five-member Board of Commissioners. The members of the Board of Commissioners are Jeff Branch, Randy Church, Mike LaBrose, Donnie Potter, and Robbie Wilkie. The Clerk to the Board is Abby Rich. The County Manager is Donald E. Duncan Jr. and Deputy County Manager is Jimmy Harrison. The Caldwell County Sheriff is Alan C. Jones. The Clerk of Superior Court is Angela Ashley Kidd. The county's Register of Deeds is Wayne Rash. Caldwell County is a member of the regional Western Piedmont Council of Governments.

In the North Carolina General Assembly, the county is represented by Republican Warren Daniel in the North Carolina Senate, as part of North Carolina Senate district 46, and by Republican Destin Hall in the North Carolina House of Representatives, as North Carolina House district 87.

Caldwell County is part of North Carolina's 5th congressional district in the United States House of Representatives and is represented by Republican Virginia Foxx. The county was moved from North Carolina's 11th congressional district in 2021 due to court ordered redistricting in North Carolina. North Carolina's congressional districts for 2023 and beyond have not yet been approved.

Caldwell County's partisan lean is very Republican. Of the county's elected legislative representatives at the county, state, and national level, all are Republicans. Since 2010, the average federal election vote in Caldwell County goes over 70% Republican.

United States presidential election results for Caldwell County, North Carolina
| Year | Republican | | Democratic | | Third party(ies) | |
| Year | No. | % | No. | % | No. | % |
|---|---|---|---|---|---|---|
| 1912 | 482 | 14.66% | 1,627 | 49.50% | 1,178 | 35.84% |
| 1916 | 1,659 | 49.02% | 1,725 | 50.98% | 0 | 0.00% |
| 1920 | 3,298 | 52.95% | 2,931 | 47.05% | 0 | 0.00% |
| 1924 | 2,503 | 42.59% | 3,348 | 56.97% | 26 | 0.44% |
| 1928 | 4,207 | 64.74% | 2,291 | 35.26% | 0 | 0.00% |
| 1932 | 3,750 | 40.43% | 5,479 | 59.07% | 46 | 0.50% |
| 1936 | 3,421 | 33.44% | 6,809 | 66.56% | 0 | 0.00% |
| 1940 | 3,005 | 32.18% | 6,334 | 67.82% | 0 | 0.00% |
| 1944 | 4,365 | 44.61% | 5,419 | 55.39% | 0 | 0.00% |
| 1948 | 4,987 | 46.24% | 5,033 | 46.67% | 765 | 7.09% |
| 1952 | 9,160 | 54.87% | 7,533 | 45.13% | 0 | 0.00% |
| 1956 | 10,833 | 61.22% | 6,861 | 38.78% | 0 | 0.00% |
| 1960 | 11,553 | 56.98% | 8,722 | 43.02% | 0 | 0.00% |
| 1964 | 8,733 | 44.60% | 10,846 | 55.40% | 0 | 0.00% |
| 1968 | 10,433 | 51.46% | 4,746 | 23.41% | 5,095 | 25.13% |
| 1972 | 12,976 | 71.41% | 4,886 | 26.89% | 309 | 1.70% |
| 1976 | 9,872 | 45.15% | 11,894 | 54.39% | 100 | 0.46% |
| 1980 | 12,965 | 58.11% | 8,738 | 39.17% | 607 | 2.72% |
| 1984 | 17,024 | 69.79% | 7,311 | 29.97% | 59 | 0.24% |
| 1988 | 15,176 | 65.78% | 7,862 | 34.08% | 33 | 0.14% |
| 1992 | 12,543 | 49.04% | 9,033 | 35.32% | 4,000 | 15.64% |
| 1996 | 12,653 | 55.18% | 8,050 | 35.11% | 2,228 | 9.72% |
| 2000 | 17,337 | 66.39% | 8,588 | 32.89% | 190 | 0.73% |
| 2004 | 21,186 | 67.58% | 9,999 | 31.90% | 163 | 0.52% |
| 2008 | 22,526 | 64.08% | 12,081 | 34.36% | 548 | 1.56% |
| 2012 | 23,229 | 66.88% | 10,898 | 31.38% | 605 | 1.74% |
| 2016 | 26,621 | 73.30% | 8,425 | 23.20% | 1,274 | 3.51% |
| 2020 | 32,119 | 74.99% | 10,245 | 23.92% | 465 | 1.09% |
| 2024 | 33,009 | 75.81% | 10,146 | 23.30% | 385 | 0.88% |

== Education ==
=== K-12 education ===
All of the county is within the Caldwell County Schools school district.

High schools operated by the district include:

- Hibriten
- South Caldwell
- West Caldwell

Private schools

- Harris Chapel Christian Academy
- Heritage Christian School
- New Beginning Christian Academy
- Moravian Prep

=== Tertiary education ===
- Caldwell Community College & Technical Institute
- Appalachian State University Center at Caldwell (a distance education site for Appalachian State University)

== Communities ==
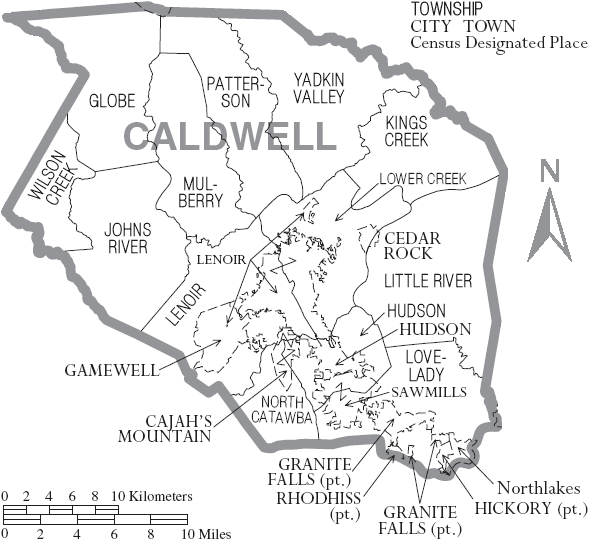
Map of Caldwell County with municipal and township labels

=== City ===
- Lenoir (county seat and largest community)

=== Towns ===
- Blowing Rock
- Cajah's Mountain
- Gamewell
- Granite Falls
- Hudson
- Rhodhiss
- Rutherford College (parts)
- Sawmills

=== Village ===
- Cedar Rock

=== Census-designated place ===
- Northlakes

=== Other unincorporated communities ===
- Abingdon
- Adako
- Baton
- Collettsville
- Dudley Shoals
- Patterson
- Globe
- Grace Chapel
- Grandin
- Happy Valley
- Kings Creek
- Legerwood
- Mortimer
- Mulberry
- Warrior
- Yadkin Valley

=== Townships ===
Townships in Caldwell County include:

- Globe
- Hudson
- Johns River
- Kings Creek
- Lenoir
- Little River
- Lovelady
- Lower Creek
- Mullberry
- North Catawba
- Patterson
- Wilson Creek
- Yadkin Valley

== See also ==
- List of counties in North Carolina
- National Register of Historic Places listings in Caldwell County, North Carolina
