= West Caldwell High School =

American public school in North Carolina

Location
- 300 W Caldwell Drive; Lenoir, North Carolina 28645; United States; 35°53′12″N 81°35′30″W

Information
- Type: Public
- Established: 1977
- School district: Caldwell County Schools
- NCES School ID: 370058000241
- Principal: Richard Griffin
- Teaching staff: 47.37 (on an FTE basis)
- Grades: 9–12
- Enrollment: 687 (2023-2024)
- Student to teacher ratio: 14.50
- Colors: Blue and gold
- Mascot: Warrior
- Nickname: Warriors
- Website: wchs.caldwellschools.com

West Caldwell High School (WCHS) is a public high school in Lenoir, North Carolina, United States. It is a part of the Caldwell County Schools district.

== Athletics ==
West Caldwell is a member of the North Carolina High School Athletic Association (NCHSAA) and are classified as a 3A school. The school is a part of the Western Piedmont 3A/4A Conference. West Caldwell's school colors are blue and gold, and its team name is the Warriors. Sports at West Caldwell include:

- Baseball
- Basketball
- Competition Cheerleading
- Cross Country
- Football
- Golf
- Marching Band
- Soccer
- Softball
- Swimming
- Tennis
- Indoor/Outdoor Track & Field
- Volleyball
- Wrestling

== Notable alumni ==
- Grant Barnette, ultramarathon runner
- Destin Hall, attorney and politician
- Jason Hatfield, actor and voice actor
