= Caldwell County Schools =

School district serving Caldwell County, North Carolina, U.S.

Location
- Caldwell County, North Carolina United States

District information
- Type: Public
- Grades: PK–12
- Superintendent: Thomas Howell Ed.D.
- Accreditation: AdvancED
- Schools: 25
- Budget: $ 109,180,000
- NCES District ID: 3700580

Students and staff
- Students: 12,811
- Teachers: 872.39 (on FTE basis)
- Staff: 844.83 (on FTE basis)
- Student–teacher ratio: 14.68:1

Other information
- Website: www.caldwellschools.com

Caldwell County Schools is a PK–12 graded school district serving Caldwell County, North Carolina. Its 25 schools serve 12,811 students as of the 2010–2011 school year.

Its boundary is that of the entire county.

== History ==
While some subscription and church schools existed in the area before Caldwell County was founded, the history of public education really begins in July, 1841, just a few months after the county was established. The first Superintendents of Common Schools were appointed that year.

School building commenced and eventually the county had as many as eight high schools. In 1977, school consolidation plans reduced the number to three main high schools.

== Student demographics ==
For the 2010–2011 school year, Caldwell County Schools had a total population of 12,811 students and 872.39 teachers on a (FTE) basis. This produced a student-teacher ratio of 14.68:1. The same year, out of the student total, the gender ratio was 50% male to 50% female. The demographic group makeup was: White, 82%; Hispanic, 8%; Black, 6%; Asian/Pacific Islander, 1%; and American Indian, 0% (two or more races: 4%). For the same school year, 54.79% of the students received free and reduced-cost lunches.

== Governance ==
The primary governing body of Caldwell County Schools follows a council–manager government format with a seven-member Board of Education appointing a Superintendent to run the day-to-day operations of the system. The school system currently resides in the North Carolina State Board of Education's Seventh District.

=== Board of education ===
The seven members of the Board of Education generally meet on the second Monday of each month.

The current members of the board are:

- Darrell Pennell (Chair)
- Chris Becker (Vice-Chair)
- Teresa Branch
- BJ Fore
- Ann Edwards
- Mark Gerson
- Joe Sims

=== Superintendent ===
The current superintendent of the Caldwell County Schools system is Thomas Howell.

== Schools ==
Caldwell County Schools has 25 schools ranging from pre-kindergarten to twelfth grade. Those 25 schools are separated into six high schools, fourmiddle schools, three combined elementary/middle schools, and eleven elementary schools, and one online academy

=== High schools ===
- Caldwell Applied Sciences Academy (Hudson)
- Caldwell Early College High School (Hudson)
- Gateway School – alternative school, grades 6–12 (Granite Falls)
- Hibriten High School (Lenoir)
- South Caldwell High School (Hudson)
- West Caldwell High School (Lenoir)

=== Middle schools ===
- Gamewell Middle School (Lenoir)
- Granite Falls Middle School (Granite Falls)
- Hudson Middle School (Hudson)
- William Lenoir Middle School (Lenoir)

=== Combined elementary and middle schools ===
- Collettsville School – grades K–8 (Collettsville)
- Happy Valley School – grades K–8 (Lenoir)
- Kings Creek School – grades K–8 (Lenoir)

=== Elementary schools ===
- Baton Elementary School (Granite Falls)
- Davenport A+ School – grades K–5 (Lenoir)
- Dudley Shoals Elementary School (Granite Falls)
- Gamewell Elementary School (Lenoir)
- Granite Falls Elementary School (Granite Falls)
- Horizons Elementary School – alternative school, grades K–5 (Lenoir)
- Hudson Elementary School (Hudson)
- Lower Creek Elementary School (Lenoir)
- Sawmills Elementary School (Granite Falls)
- Valmead Elementary School (Lenoir)
- Whitnel Elementary School (Lenoir)

=== Online ===
- Caldwell Online Academy (4-12)

== Athletics ==
According to the North Carolina High School Athletic Association, for the 2012–2013 school year:

- Hibriten is a 3A school in the Northwestern Conference
- South Caldwell is a 4A school in the Northwestern Conference
- West Caldwell is a 2A school in the Catawba Valley Conference
- Caldwell Early College, Caldwell Middle College, and Gateway School do not have athletic teams

== See also ==
- List of school districts in North Carolina
