= Adako, North Carolina =

Unincorporated community in North Carolina, US

Coordinates: 35°54′15″N 81°42′14″W

Adako is an unincorporated community located in Caldwell County, North Carolina.
