= Wesley Harris =

American politician

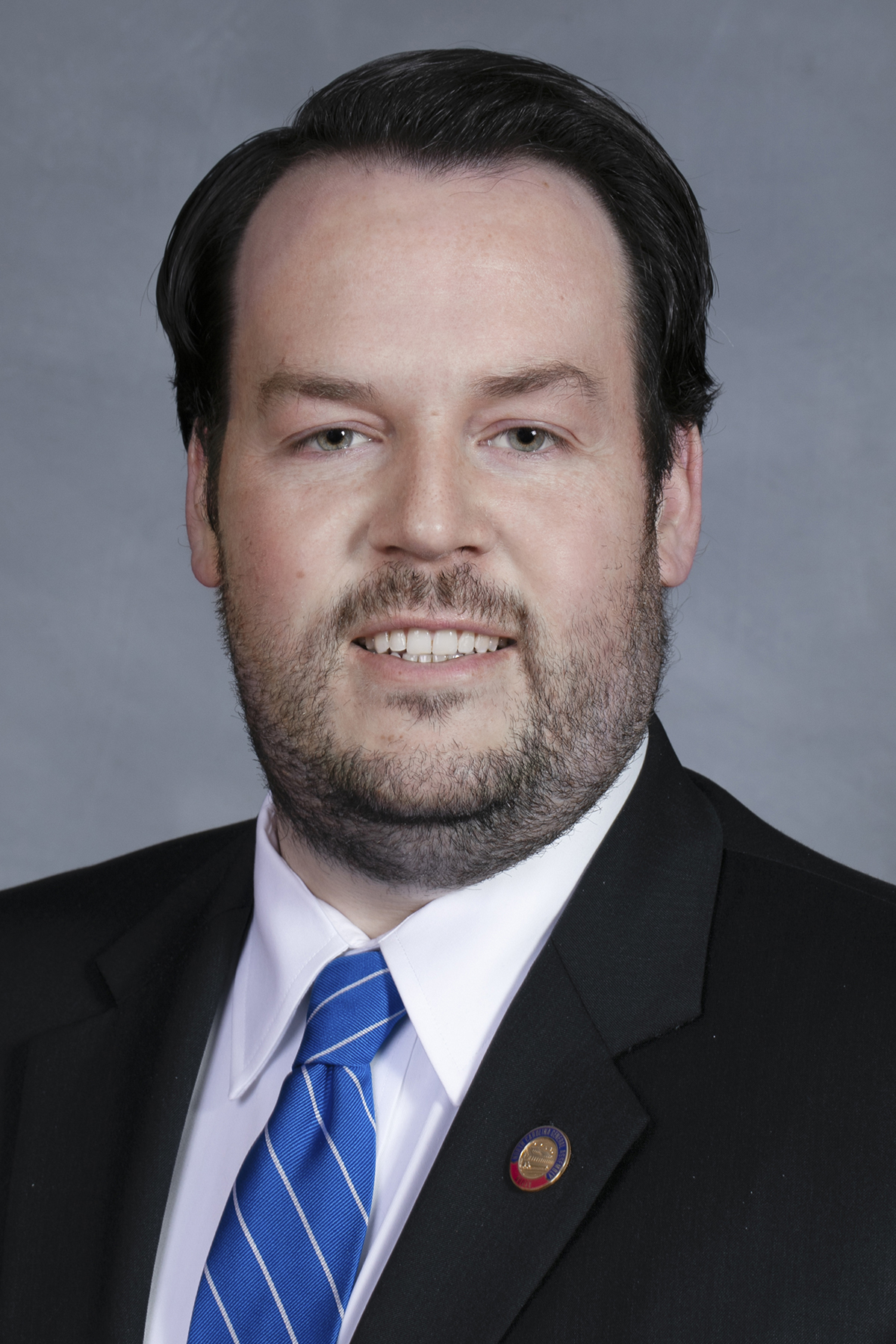

Member of the North Carolina House of Representatives from the 105th district
- In office January 1, 2019 – January 1, 2025
- Preceded by: Scott Stone
- Succeeded by: Laura Budd (redistricted)

Personal details
- Born: Wesley Ryan Harris; September 22, 1986 (age 40) Taylorsville, North Carolina, U.S.
- Party: Democratic
- Education: University of North Carolina, Chapel Hill (BA); Clemson University (MA, PhD)
- Website: State House website Campaign website

Wesley Ryan Harris (born September 22, 1986) is an American economist and politician who served as a member of the North Carolina House of Representatives representing the 105th district from 2019 to 2025. He was the Democratic nominee for state treasurer in the 2024 election.

== Early life and education ==
Born in Taylorsville, North Carolina, Harris received a Bachelor of Arts in economics from the University of North Carolina at Chapel Hill. He later attended Clemson University earning a Master of Arts and a Doctor of Philosophy in economics.

== Political career ==
Harris won his first election on November 6, 2018, securing 52 percent of the vote over incumbent Republican Scott Stone, secured 48 percent. He has been twice re-elected, defeating Republican challengers Amy Bynum in 2020 and Joshua Niday in 2022.

On March 13, 2023, Harris announced a run for North Carolina State Treasurer. He earned the Democratic nomination on March 5, 2024 with 66.59% of the vote. He lost to Republican Brad Briner.

=== Committee assignments ===
2023–24 session

- Agriculture
- Finance
- Judiciary 3
- Marine Resources and Aquaculture
- Transportation

2021–22 session

- Education - Universities
- Finance
- Judiciary III
- Marine Resources and Aquaculture
- Transportation

2019–20 session

- Finance
- Judiciary
- Transportation
- Homeland Security, Military, and Veterans Affairs Committee

== Personal life ==
Harris lives in Charlotte, North Carolina.

== Electoral history ==
=== 2024 ===
North Carolina State Treasurer Democratic primary election, 2024
Party	Candidate	Votes	%
Democratic	Wesley Harris	433,791	66.59%
Democratic	Gabe Esparza	217,689	33.41%
Total votes		651,480	100%

North Carolina State Treasurer general election, 2024
Party	Candidate	Votes	%
Republican	Brad Briner	2,900,059	52.45%
Democratic	Wesley Harris	2,629,444	47.55%
Total votes		5,529,503	100%
Republican hold			

=== 2022 ===
North Carolina House of Representatives 105th district general election, 2022
Party	Candidate	Votes	%
Democratic	Wesley Harris (incumbent)	17,545	56.87%
Republican	Joshua Niday	13,307	43.13%
Total votes		30,852	100%
Democratic hold			

=== 2020 ===
North Carolina House of Representatives 105th district general election, 2020
Party	Candidate	Votes	%
Democratic	Wesley Harris (incumbent)	25,732	54.78%
Republican	Amy Bynum	21,245	45.22%
Total votes		46,977	100%
Democratic hold			

=== 2018 ===
North Carolina House of Representatives 105th district Democratic primary election, 2018
Party	Candidate	Votes	%
Democratic	Wesley Harris	2,244	70.48%
Democratic	Ayoub Ouederni	940	29.52%
Total votes		3,184	100%

North Carolina House of Representatives 105th district general election, 2018
Party	Candidate	Votes	%
Democratic	Wesley Harris	18,362	52.29%
Republican	Scott Stone (incumbent)	16,753	47.71%
Total votes		35,115	100%
Democratic gain from Republican			

Party political offices
Preceded by Ronnie Chatterji	Democratic nominee for Treasurer of North Carolina; 2024	Most recent
