= KIAC =

KIAC (Key Information for Air Cargo), is a computer reservations system owned and used by FedEx for booking cargo space on their freighter aircraft. It is an old IBM PO4 system and was brought to FedEx with the purchase of Flying Tigers in 1989.

== History ==
KIAC was initially designed as a tracking/tracing system with Unit Load Device (ULD) control and shipment movement data appended to each airbill/air waybill, but subsequently grew to include several other facets in order to remain competitive with growing automation in the industry. Flying Tigers played a major role in the development and implementation of interfaces with Customs systems worldwide, and with many other aspects of developments in the airline cargo world through its participation in IATA and ATA.

== Support ==
KIAC is supported by the company's KIAC System Support Group (KSSG) based in Los Angeles. Mainframe support is operated by Network Operations Control (NOC) in Memphis, Tennessee.

== Future ==
KIAC is due to be replaced in the near future by a server-based system and taken off of the mainframe. It will be more user friendly by using English commands as opposed to the present three-letter acronyms.
