= Airport dolly =

Airport dollies for unit load device (ULD) and cargo pallets are standard sized flatbed trolley or platform, with many wheels, roller bars or ball bearings protruding above the top surface for easy loading and unloading of ULD and cargo pallets respectively. Since ULD/pallet rest on ball bearings, these dollies are equipped with hinge/locks to secure the position of the ULD/pallet on them during tugging transportation. The aviation industry adopted ULD/pallets to be lightweight containers and supporting platforms respectively, intended to be loaded into aircraft and fly along with their loads, they need to be minimum in weight and thus do not have wheels or strong base structure. Also, the ULD/pallets have stringent dimensional standard following the aircraft cargo bay dimension. Therefore, these dollies are custom designed to complement the ULD/pallet's dimension, hinge/fixture position, weak overall physical strength and transportation need. Advanced dollies for ULD and pallets, such as those used on an airport apron, may have the following specialized facilities:

- Rollers – Dollies have built-in rollers or balls bearings on the deck to assist in the moving of containers or pallets. Advance dollies have two sets of power driven rollers, one set moves the container forward and backward, and the other move it left and right. The precise movement is needed to align the center of gravity of the container to the center of the deck, or else the dollies may turn over when in motion. In addition, the containers or pallets on dollies are secured with built-in locks.
- Revolving platform – Some dollies have a revolving platform to facilitate rotating the ULDs to the correct orientation before transferring them onto a cargo conveyor belt or ULD/pallet lift leading to the aircraft bay. Some revolving platforms are power assisted.
- Brakes – Dollies have mechanical brakes which automatically lock the dolly wheels when the towbar is in the parked (vertical) orientation, and automatically release the dolly wheels when the towbar is in the towing (horizontal) orientation. No explicit manual locking/unlocking action by the operator is needed.

Dolly fleet management is an issue specific to the airport ground support industry. Dollies are not inexpensive consumable equipment like a hand trolley. Dollies are numerous (thousands) on a large airport apron. An airport usually has more than one dolly fleet operator, using dollies not greatly different in appearance, and each operator is using many types of dollies simultaneously. The apron is a large area that using direct eyesight to find an item is not easy. A dolly in operation needs frequent detachment and re-attachment from the tug and other dollies. It is not access controlled (it does not need a car key be used, like an automobile). It is not always supervised by the same driver (any tractor can come to pick up any dolly and tug them away, sometimes erroneously). As a result of all above factors, dollies do get lost/misplaced on an apron, or at least dollies fleet management is an ongoing burden for ground support equipment operator. Major airports are starting to attach battery power active RFID tags to dollies to facilitate their fleet management. The active RFID tags can be detected at up to 100m away in open space from the fixed RFID reader antenna, which can be mounted at the aircraft loading bridges. The RFID tag report the dolly's facility number as well as the "battery weak" and "strong collision" status, making management of the RFID tags (and thus the associated dolly) easier.

== Gallery ==
Airport dolly gallery

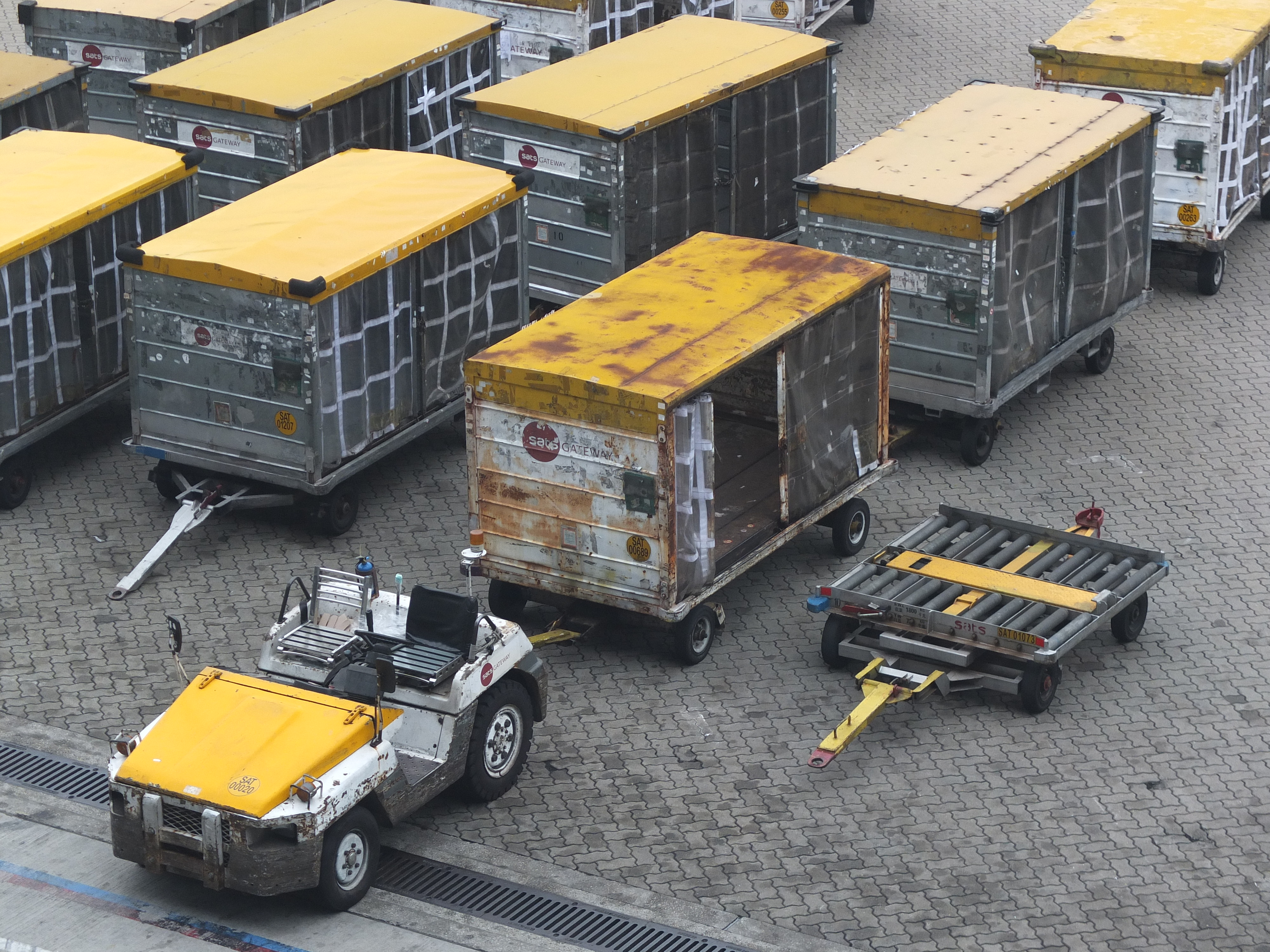
A single dolly for an aircraft cargo Unit Load Device, next to a group of dollies for loose luggage.

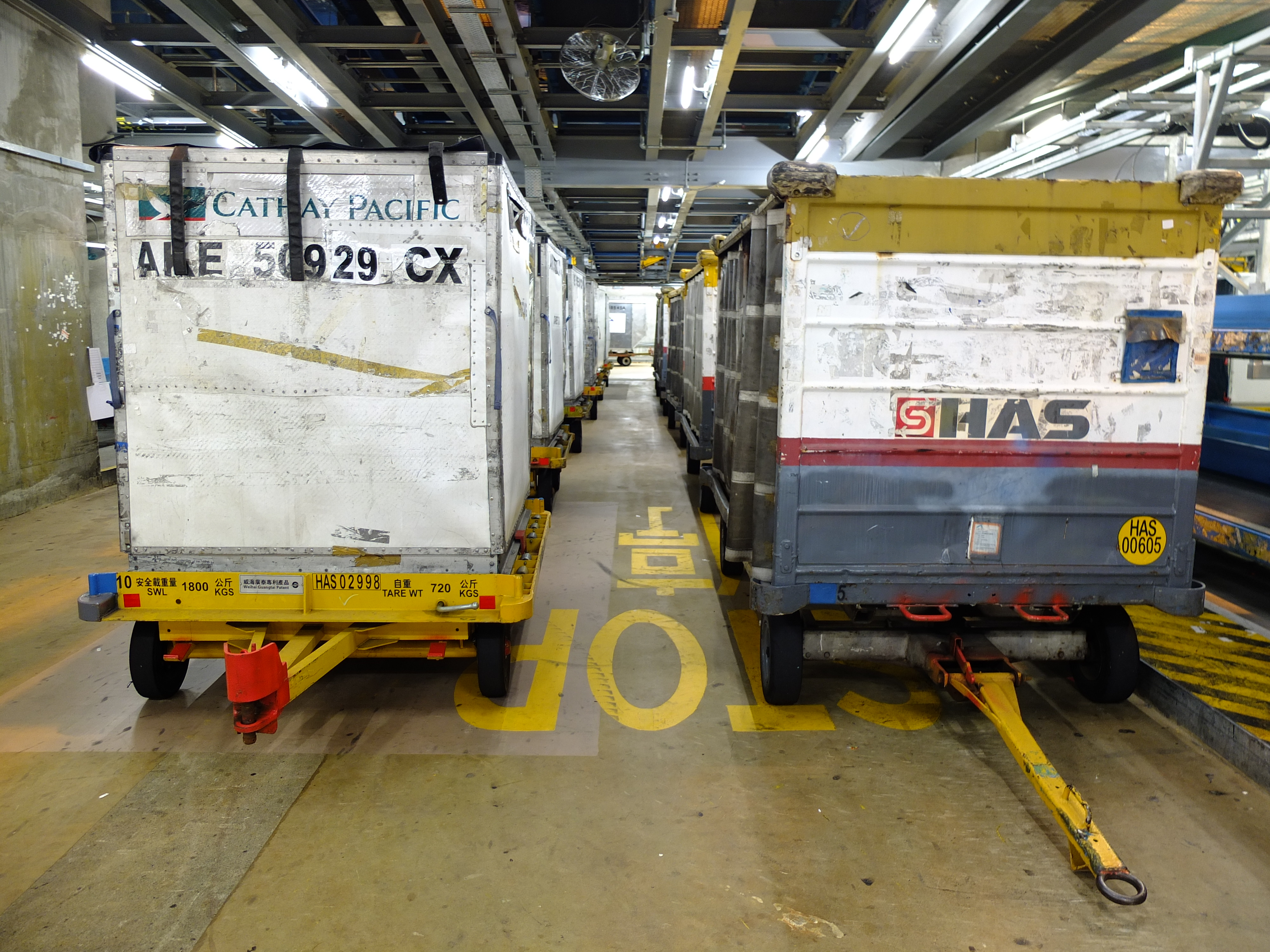
Those on the left are dollies from Cathay Pacific for baggage unit load devices (ULDs). Those on the right are dollies for loose baggage.

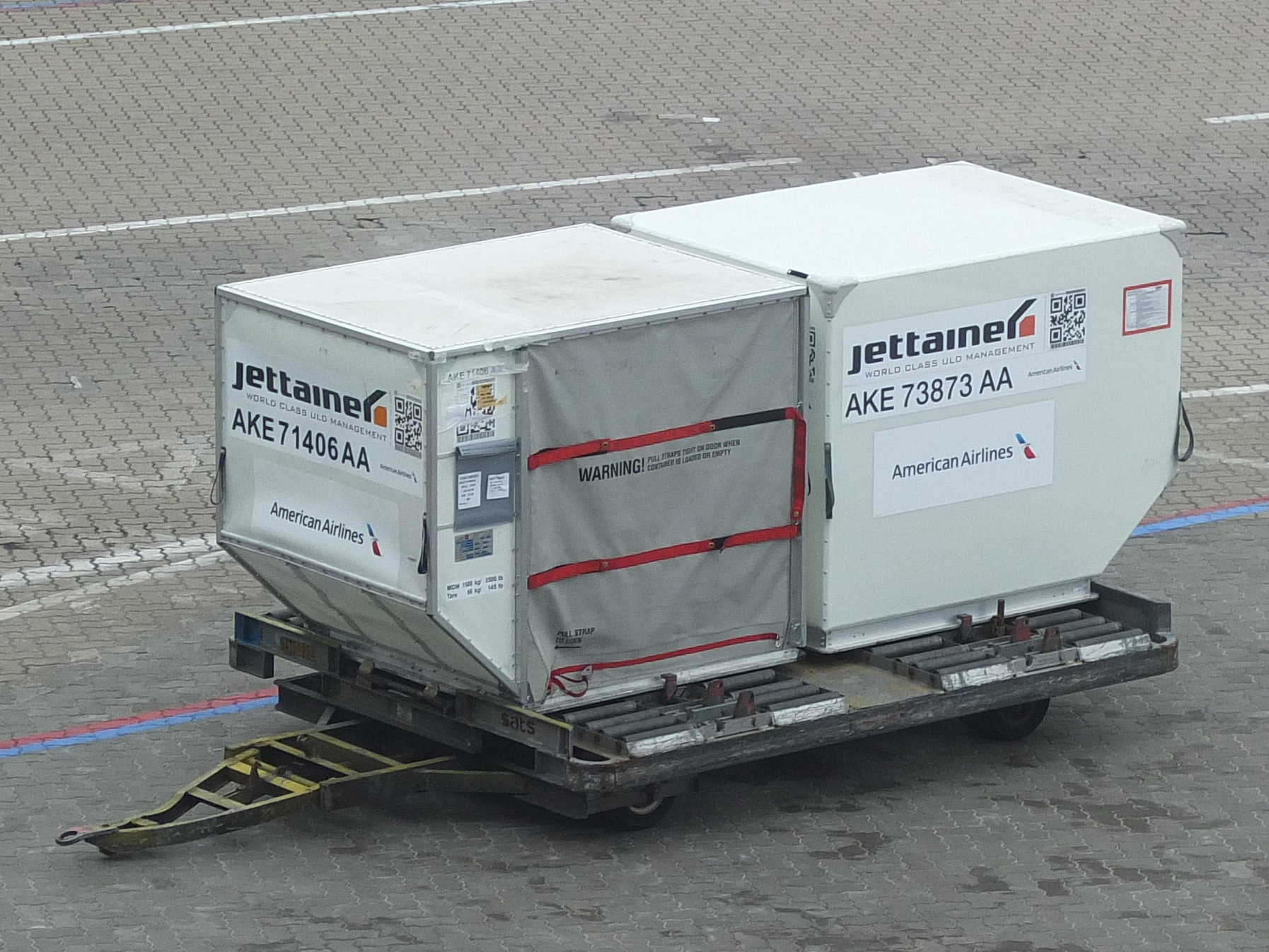
A large dolly holding two aircraft cargo Unit Load Devices for American Airlines.

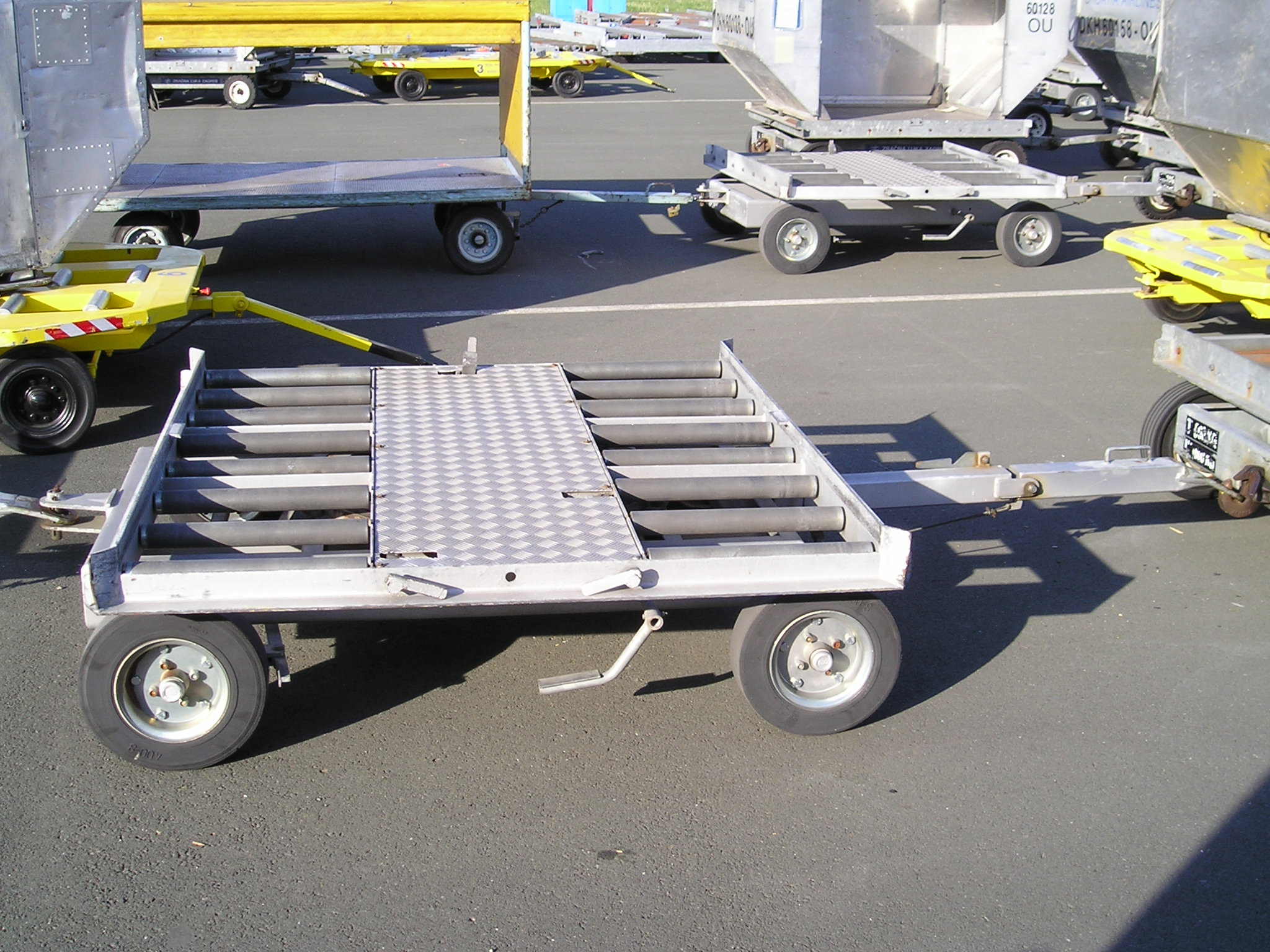
Dolly for unit load devices

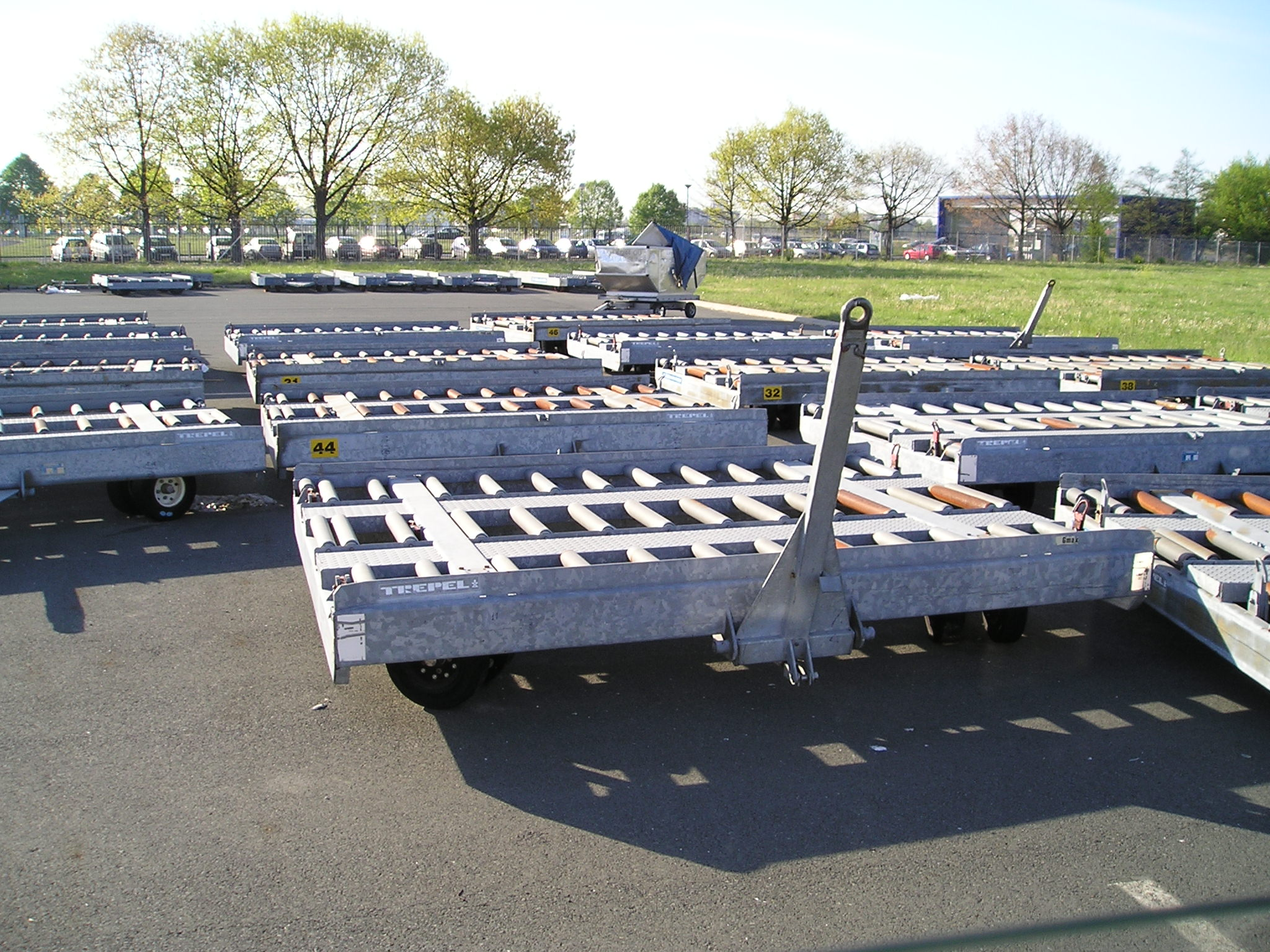
Dolly for cargo pallets

== See also ==
- Index of aviation articles
- Dolly (trailer)
