= LNY =

LNY, or Lny, may refer to

- IATA code for Lanai Airport, Hawaii, US
- National Rail code for Langley railway station, Berkshire, UK
- Lunar New Year
