= Mountain Air Cargo =

Airline of the United States

IATA	ICAO	Call sign
C2	MTN	MOUNTAIN
- Founded: 1982
- AOC #: MTNA123B
- Fleet size: 35
- Destinations: Several, primarily East Coast region and Caribbean
- Parent company: Air T, Inc
- Headquarters: Denver, North Carolina, United States
- Employees: 270 (2015)
- Website: https://www.mtaircargo.com/

Mountain Air Cargo (MAC) is an American cargo airline based in Denver, North Carolina. It is a major contract carrier for FedEx Express, operating in the eastern United States and the Caribbean region. Previous turboprop operations in South America have been discontinued by FedEx, which now operates jet aircraft in that area. MAC is one of the largest feeder airlines in the United States. Its main maintenance facility is at Kinston Regional Jetport. All of the ATR, C408, and C208 aircraft operated by Mountain Air are owned by FedEx Express, and are operated by MAC on a "dry lease" basis.

== History ==
The airline was established in 1974 and is wholly owned by Air T, Inc. It has 270 employees (as of November 2015).

== Fleet ==
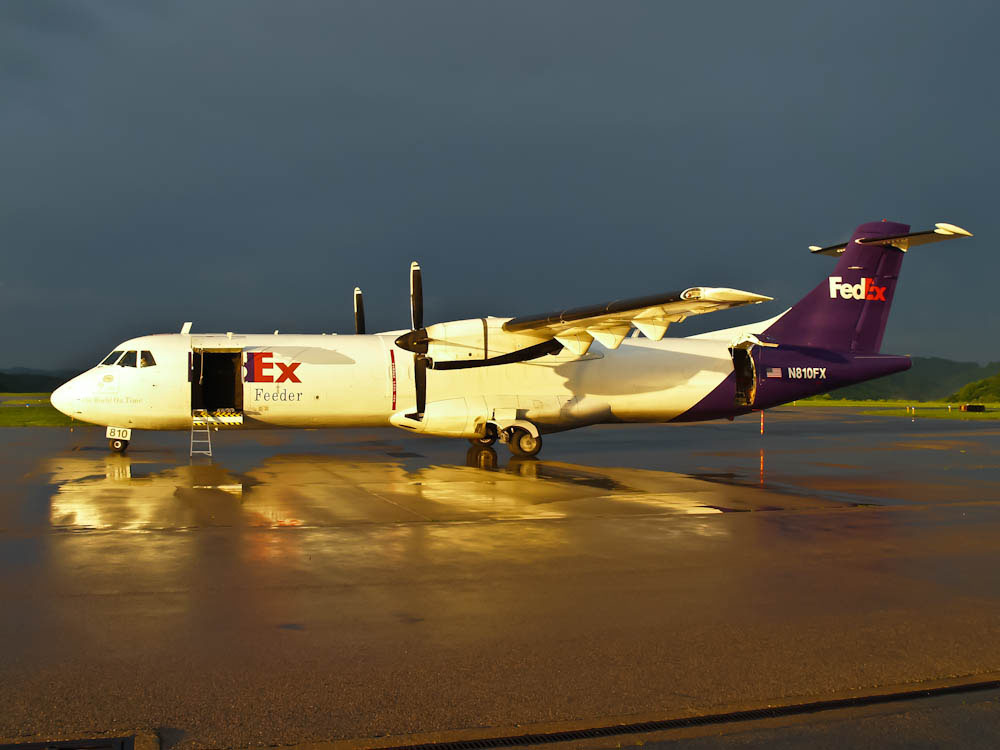
A Mountain Air Cargo ATR 72 freighter

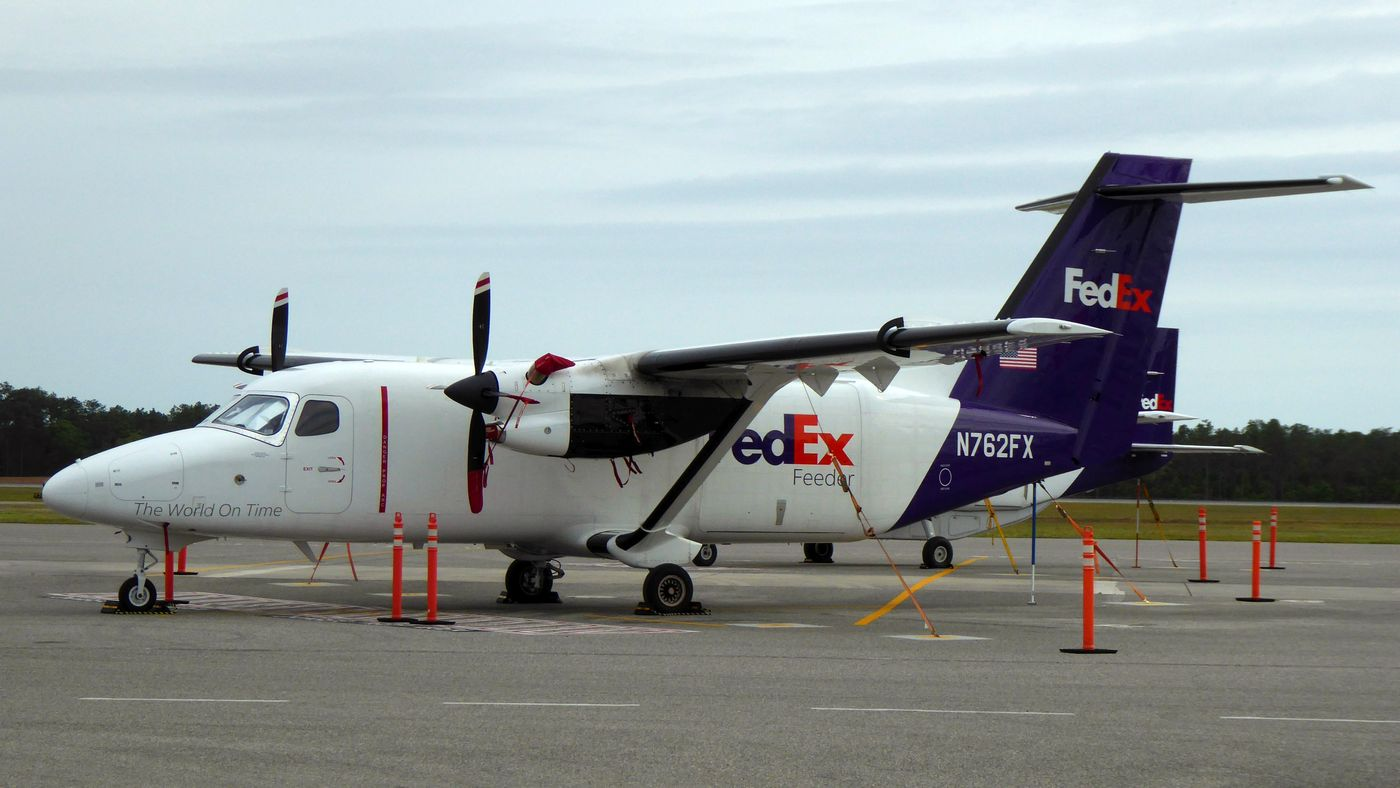
A Cessna 408 SkyCourier owned by FedEx Feeder and operated by Mountain Air Cargo

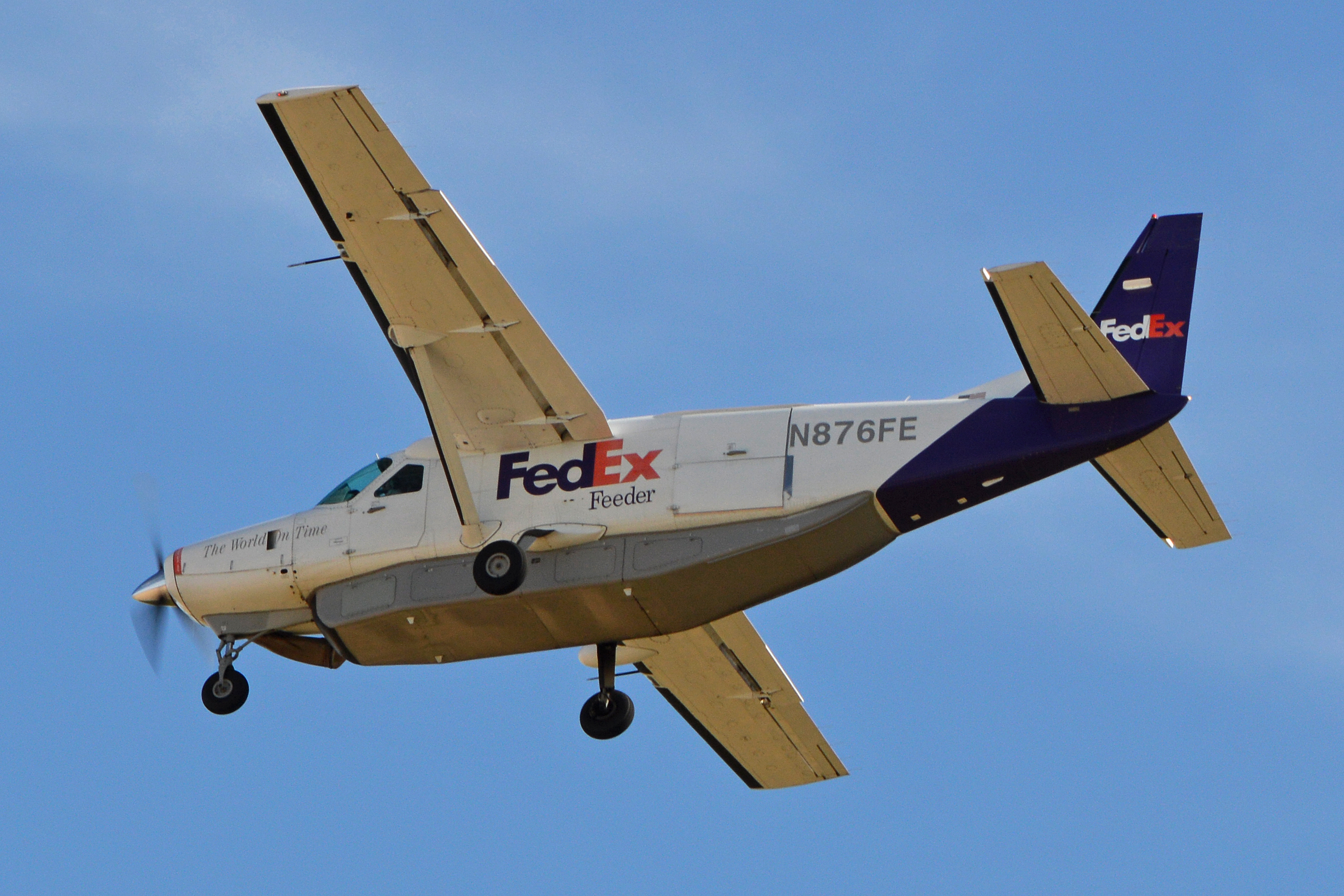
A Cessna 208B Super Cargomaster.

As of August 2025, Mountain Air Cargo operates the following aircraft:

Mountain Air Cargo fleet
Aircraft	In service	Orders	Passengers	Notes
ATR 42-300F	7	—		
ATR 42-320F	2	—		
ATR 72-200F	10	—		
ATR 72-600F	4	—		
Cessna 408 SkyCourier	12	—		
Total	35	—		

In September 2016 the Mountain Air Cargo fleet included:

- 8 ATR 42-300
- 2 ATR 42-320
- 3 ATR 72-202
- 6 ATR 72-212
- 33 Cessna 208B Super Cargomasters

As of July 13, 2023, the Mountain Air Cargo fleet includes 40 Cessna 208s, 7 Cessna 408 Skycouriers, and 21 ATRs (including 4 ATR 72-600F).

== Incidents and accidents ==
- October 11, 1985 - a de Havilland Canada DHC-6-200 Twin Otter registered N3257, on a flight from State College to Pittsburgh in Pennsylvania, collided with rising terrain near Homer City, Pennsylvania. The pilot, who was the only occupant, was killed.
- January 19, 1988 - a de Havilland Canada DHC-6-200 Twin Otter registered N996SA, on a flight from Erie, Pennsylvania, to Charlotte, North Carolina, descended below the glide path on approach to Charlotte/Douglas International Airport, collided with a tree and struck the ground 1.6 km away from the airport. The crash was caused by pilot error. The pilot, who was the only occupant, was severely injured.
- January 9, 1998 - a Cessna 208B Super Cargomaster, on takeoff from Maiden-Little Mountain Airport in Maiden, North Carolina, on a flight to Greensboro, North Carolina, veered off the runway and hit trees. The crash was determined to be due to the control gust lock still being in place during the takeoff. The pilot, who was the only occupant, was killed.
- March 8, 2003 - a Fokker F27-500 Friendship with the registration N712FE, en route from Greensboro, North Carolina, to New Bern, North Carolina, indicated an unsafe landing gear condition during the approach to New Bern. A tower flyby was performed, and the tower controller confirmed the right gear was not fully extended. The crew declared an emergency and diverted to Kinston Regional Jetport to conduct an emergency landing. On the landing roll the right main landing gear collapsed and the airplane slid off the runway. Examination of the right main landing gear revealed the drag brace was fractured. The aircraft was retired from service. There were no casualties.
- April 27, 2004 - Fokker F27-500 registration N715FE departed Buenos Aires, Argentina, for a cargo flight to São Paulo-Viracopos, Brazil, via Porto Alegre. En route on the first leg, a crew member noticed the presence of smoke and discovered a fire in the cargo bay. Efforts to extinguish the fire were unsuccessful. The crew performed a safe emergency landing at Melo, Uruguay. The airplane suffered considerable damage in the cargo compartment. There were no casualties. The fire was caused by improperly packaged and labeled hazardous materials.
- August 12, 2015 - Cessna 208B Super Cargomaster registration N924FE departed San Juan-Luis Muñoz Marín International Airport (SJU), Puerto Rico at 10:49 hours local time. Enroute near the DANDE waypoint smoke entered the cabin from the engine compartment. The pilot changed course for an emergency landing but was forced to ditch a half mile of the Saba coast. The pilot was rescued.
- February 7, 2020 - Cessna 208 Super Cargomaster registration N988FX was conducting an instrument landing approach in instrument meteorological conditions to runway 10 at Baltimore/Washington International Thurgood Marshall Airport, MD (BWI). The pilot struck approach light towers and a localizer antenna before landing. No injuries occurred.
