= Memorial Reformed Church =

Historic church in North Carolina, United States

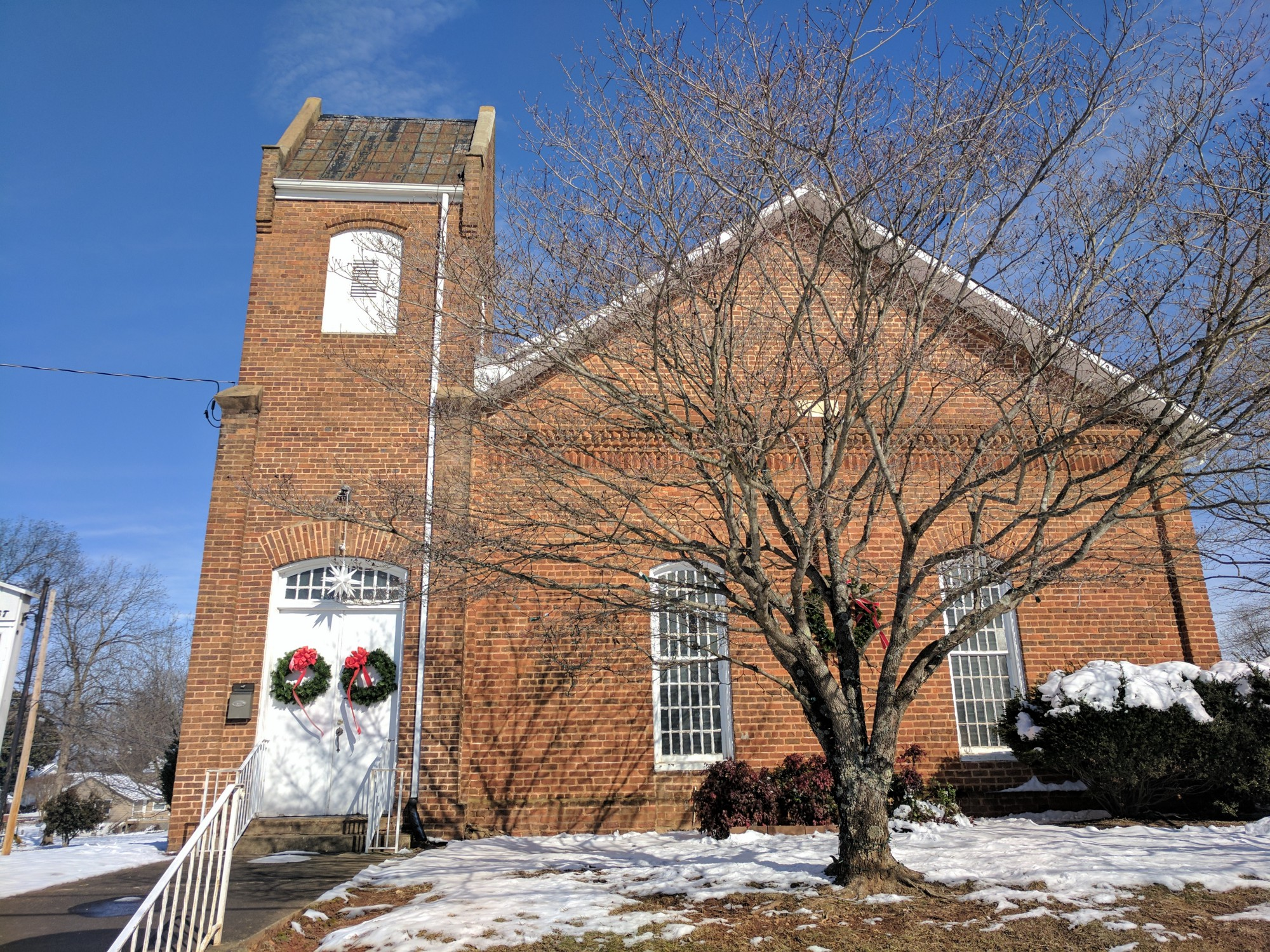

Memorial Reformed Church, also known as Memorial United Church of Christ, is a historic church located at 201 E. Main Street in Maiden, Catawba County, North Carolina. It was built in 1887, and is a brick church with Gothic Revival and Neoclassical style design elements. In 1914, a two-stage bell tower with entrance was added to a corner of the church. Attached to the rear of the church in 1936–1937, is a Sunday School Building.

It was added to the National Register of Historic Places in 1990.
