= Franklin D. Reinhardt and Harren–Hood Farms =

Historic farm in North Carolina, United States

- Franklin D. Reinhardt and Harren-Hood Farms
- U.S. National Register of Historic Places
- U.S. Historic district
- Location within North Carolina Location within the United States
- Location: SR 2013 northwest of the junction with SR 2012, near Maiden, North Carolina
- Coordinates: 35°37′05″N 81°14′21″W
- Area: 166 acres (67 ha)
- Built: c. 1845
- Architectural style: Greek Revival, Late Victorian I-House
- MPS: Catawba County MPS
- NRHP reference No.: 90000863
- Added to NRHP: June 21, 1990

Franklin D. Reinhardt and Harren–Hood Farms, also known as the Franklin D. Reinhardt Farm and Alonzo Harren Farm, is a set of two adjoining historic farms and national historic district located near Maiden, Catawba County, North Carolina. The district encompasses 5 contributing buildings and 1 contributing site. The Franklin D. Reinhardt House was built about 1845, and is a two-story, Greek Revival style dwelling nearly identical to the William Pinckney Reinhardt House. Also on the property is a contributing granary. The Harren-Hood House was built about 1908, and is a two-story frame, late Victorian farmhouse. Also on the property is a contributing granary and cattle barn.

It was added to the National Register of Historic Places in 1990.
