= Miller–Cansler House =

Historic house in North Carolina, United States

- Miller-Cansler House
- U.S. National Register of Historic Places
- Location within North Carolina Location within the United States
- Location: North side of SR 2007, 0.5 miles (0.80 km) east of the junction with SR 1005, near Maiden, North Carolina
- Coordinates: 35°35′47″N 81°15′14″W
- Area: 2 acres (0.81 ha)
- Built: 1820
- Architectural style: Federal
- MPS: Catawba County MPS
- NRHP reference No.: 90000741
- Added to NRHP: May 10, 1990

Miller–Cansler House, also known as the Adam Miller Jr. House, is a historic home located near Maiden, Catawba County, North Carolina. It was built about 1820, and is a two-story, frame Federal style farmhouse. It features a full-width shed-roofed porch. A one-story frame ell was added in 1941.

It was listed on the National Register of Historic Places in 1990.
