= Caleb Farley =

American football player (born 1998)

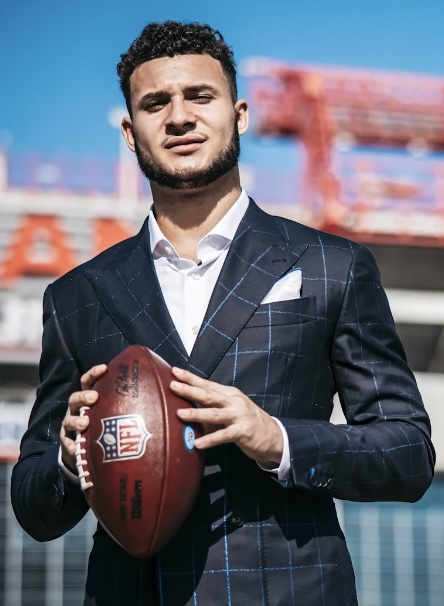
- Farley in 2021

Profile
- Position: Cornerback

Personal information
- Born: November 2, 1998 (age 28); Maiden, North Carolina, U.S.
- Listed height: 6 ft 2 in (1.88 m)
- Listed weight: 197 lb (89 kg)

Career information
- High school: Maiden
- College: Virginia Tech (2017–2020)
- NFL draft: 2021: 1st round, 22nd overall pick

Career history
- Tennessee Titans (2021–2023); Carolina Panthers (2024)

Awards and highlights
- First-team All-ACC (2019)

Career NFL statistics
- Total tackles: 31
- Pass deflections: 1
- Stats at Pro Football Reference

Caleb Ray Farley (born November 2, 1998) is an American professional football cornerback. He played college football for the Virginia Tech Hokies and was selected by the Tennessee Titans in the first round of the 2021 NFL draft.

Farley struggled with injuries throughout his tenure with the Titans. He played in only twelve games with two starts in his first two seasons before missing the entire 2023 season. He was released by the Titans prior to the start of the 2024 season. He then signed with the Carolina Panthers during the regular season, appearing in nine games primarily as a backup.

== Early life ==
Farley attended Maiden High School in Maiden, North Carolina. He played quarterback in high school. As a senior he passed for 1,776 yards with 21 touchdowns and rushed for 2,574 yards with 37 rushing touchdowns. For his career he had 10,425 total yards and 124 touchdowns. He committed to Virginia Tech to play college football.

== College career ==
Farley originally intended to be a wide receiver his freshman year at Virginia Tech in 2017, but missed the season due to a torn ACL. Returning from the injury in 2018, he was converted into a cornerback. He finished the season with 36 tackles, two interceptions and a sack. In 2019 Farley was named a first-team All-ACC after recording 20 tackles, four interceptions, and a touchdown.

Farley returned to Virginia Tech for his junior season in 2020 but later opted out due to COVID-19 pandemic.

== Professional career ==
Pre-draft measurables
Height	Weight	Arm length	Hand span
6 ft 1 7/8 in (1.88 m)	197 lb (89 kg)	33 3/8 in (0.85 m)	8 3/4 in (0.22 m)
All values from Pro Day

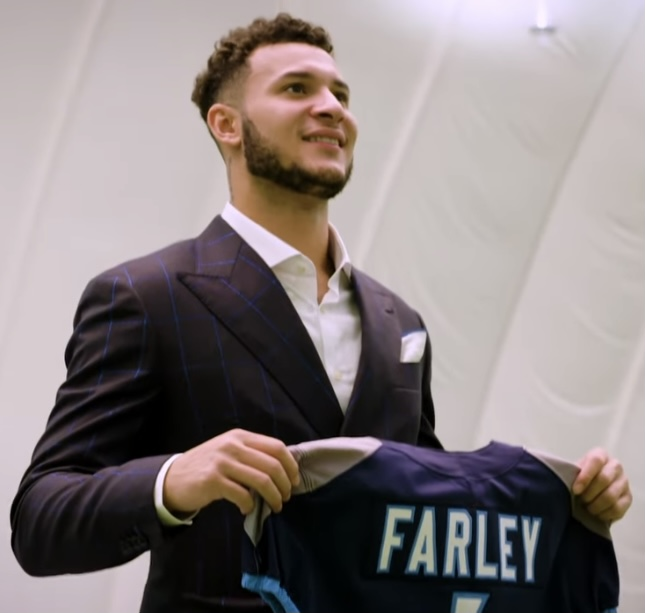
Farley after being drafted by the Titans

Farley was considered a very risky prospect for the upcoming NFL draft due to concerns over his multiple injuries and recent back problems. As a result, his draft stock fell and he was regarded as a high risk, high reward prospect.

=== Tennessee Titans ===
Farley was selected by the Tennessee Titans with the 22nd overall pick in the 2021 NFL draft. On May 13, 2021, the Titans signed Farley to a fully guaranteed four-year, $13.945 million contract. Heading into training camp, Farley was placed on the non-football injury list on July 24, 2021. He passed a physical and was activated off the non-football injury list on August 2, 2021, playing in his first practice the same day.

In Week 6, Farley suffered a torn ACL and was placed on season-ending injured reserve on October 19, 2021.

Farley entered the 2022 season as a backup cornerback for the Titans. He played in nine games before suffering a herniated disk in his back in Week 10. He was placed on injured reserve on November 15, 2022. On December 8, the Titans announced that Farley would miss the remainder of the season, after undergoing a microdiscectomy on his back.

Farley began the 2023 season on the reserve/physically unable to perform list.

On May 2, 2024, the Titans declined the fifth-year option on Farley's contract, making him a free agent after the 2024 season. Farley was released on August 27, 2024.

=== Carolina Panthers ===
On October 2, 2024, Farley was signed to the Carolina Panthers practice squad. He made his debut with the Panthers on October 27 against the Denver Broncos. He was signed to the active roster on November 18.

== Personal life ==
On August 22, 2023, Farley's home in Mooresville, North Carolina, was leveled in an explosion, killing his father Robert Farley and injuring another man.

Farley holds a youth football camp in his hometown of Maiden, working to help aspiring football players.
