= Tassili Travail Aérien =

Algerian specialized aviation services company

IATA	ICAO	Call sign
—	TTA	TASSILI WORK
- Founded: 2011
- Commenced operations: April 2014
- Operating bases: Houari Boumedienne Airport; Oued Irara–Krim Belkacem Airport
- Destinations: Specialized Aerial Work
- Parent company: Sonatrach
- Headquarters: Algiers, Algeria
- Website: tassilitravailaerien.dz

Tassili Travail Aérien (TTA) is an Algerian aviation company specializing in aerial work and technical flight missions. Headquartered in Algiers, it is a wholly owned subsidiary of the state energy group Sonatrach.

The company serves as the primary tactical aviation provider for Algeria's oil and gas infrastructure, public health emergencies, and environmental protection. While its former parent company, Tassili Airlines (now known as Domestic Airlines), transitioned to Air Algérie in 2025 to handle scheduled domestic passenger travel, TTA was retained by Sonatrach to focus exclusively on industrial and utility operations.

== History ==
Tassili Travail Aérien was established as a separate legal entity in 2011 to consolidate the "aerial work" (travail aérien) activities previously performed by its parent company, Tassili Airlines. In April 2014, the company received its independent Air Operator's Certificate (AOC) from the Algerian National Civil Aviation Agency (ANAC).

In June 2025, during the Paris Air Show, TTA reached a major milestone by signing a purchase agreement for two Cessna 408 SkyCourier aircraft. This deal marked the first order for the SkyCourier in Africa and the first global order for its aero-medical configuration.

== Operations and Services ==
TTA operates primarily out of Algiers and a specialized maintenance and operations hub in Hassi Messaoud. Its services are divided into several technical categories:

- Industrial support: Transporting personnel and VIP delegations for Sonatrach and its partners within the Hassi Messaoud and Hassi R'Mel oil fields.
- Aero-medical evacuation: Providing 24/7 medical evacuation (EVASAN) services for injured or ill industrial workers to specialized hospitals in northern Algeria.
- Forest firefighting: Supporting the Algerian Civil Protection during summer fire seasons using water-bombing aircraft.
- Utility services: Aerial photography, agricultural crop spraying, and high-voltage power line monitoring.

The company is a registered member of the Flight Safety Foundation's Basic Aviation Risk Standard (BARS) program, ensuring its operations meet international safety benchmarks for the mining and energy sectors.

== Fleet ==
As of January 2026, the Tassili Travail Aérien fleet consists of the following aircraft types:

- Air Tractor AT-802
- AS350 Squirrel
- Beechcraft 1900D
- Bell 206LR
- Beriev Be-200
- Bombardier Challenger 650
- Cessna 208B
- Cessna 408 SkyCourier
- Let L-410D
- Pilatus PC-6

== Accidents and incidents ==
- On 10 August 2017, a Tassili Travail Aérien Bell 206 was destroyed by impact and post-impact fire when it crashed on an empty lot at Dekakna, about 5 km southwest of Douera, Algeria. All four on board are believed to have died in the accident. The accident happened in daylight (1020L) and apparently in VMC. According to press reports the helicopter was being used to film the new railway line between Zeralda and Algiers.

== See also ==
- Sonatrach
- List of airlines of Algeria
- Transport in Algeria
