= Salem Union Church and Cemetery =

Historic site in Lincoln County, North Carolina, US

- U.S. National Register of Historic Places
- Location within North Carolina Location within the United States
- Location: Jct. of NC 1005 (Startown Rd.) and NC 1274 (Maiden-Salem Rd.), SE corner, near Maiden, North Carolina
- Coordinates: 35°32′51″N 81°15′54″W
- Area: 4.3 acres (1.7 ha)
- Built: 1849
- Architectural style: Late Gothic Revival, Mixed (more Than 2 Styles From Different Periods)
- NRHP reference No.: 95001118
- Added to NRHP: October 04, 1995

Salem Union Church and Cemetery, also known as Salem Lutheran Church and Salem United Church of Christ, is a historic United Church of Christ church and cemetery located near Maiden, Lincoln County, North Carolina. The church was built in 1849 as a simple rectangular brick building, and enlarged and remodeled in the Late Gothic Revival style in 1914–1915. With the remodeling, a two-stage corner tower was added and the window and door openings converted to lancet-arch openings. A two-story Sunday School addition was built in 1936–1937 and in 1989 a Fellowship Hall was built to form an H-shaped church building. Also on the property is a contributing well shed (c. 1928) and cemetery with burials dating to 1792.

It was listed on the National Register of Historic Places in 1995.
