= Cessna 408 SkyCourier =

Twin-turboprop utility aircraft

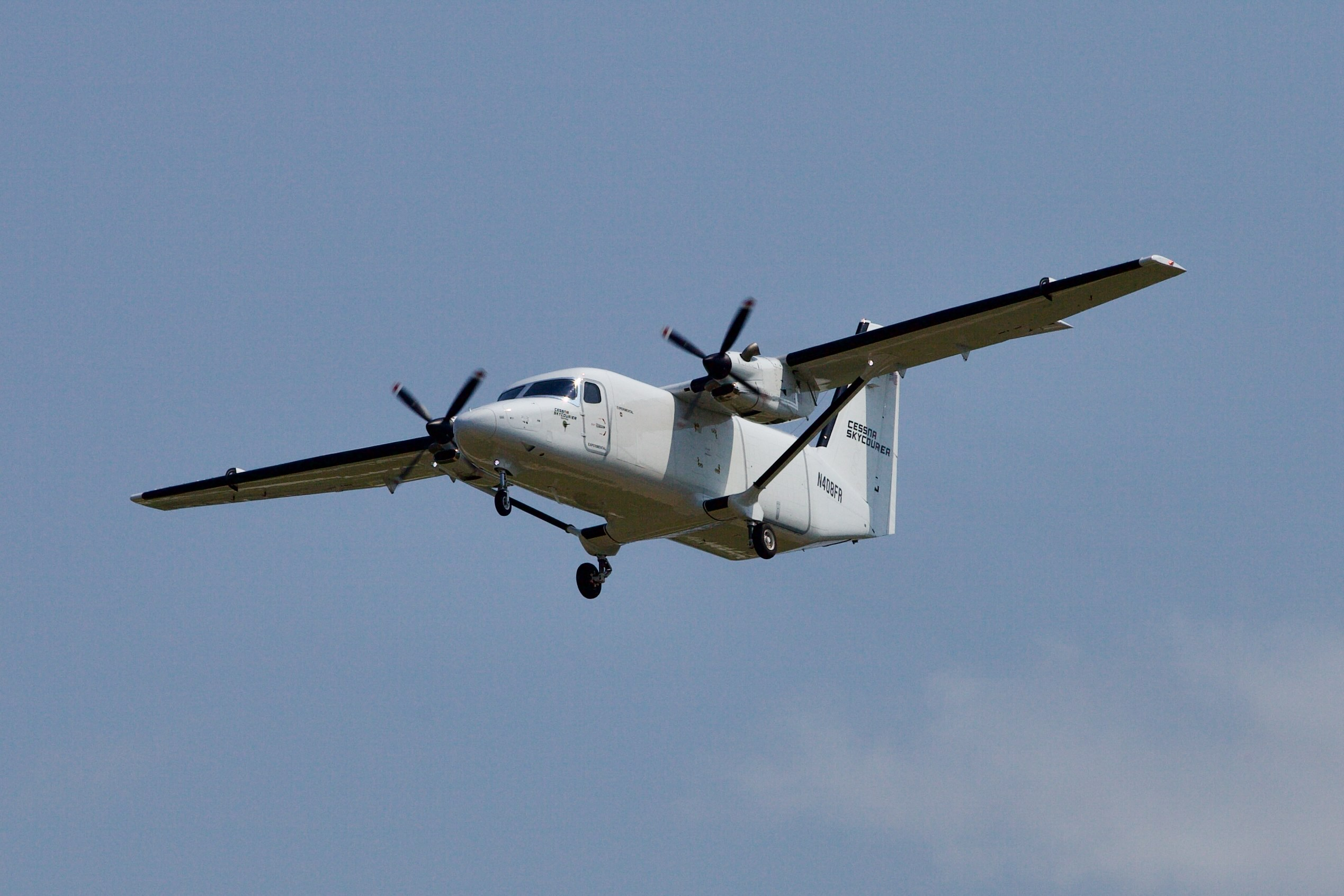
- SkyCourier prototype in flight

General information
- Type: Utility aircraft
- National origin: United States
- Manufacturer: Cessna (Textron Aviation)
- Status: In production
- Primary user: FedEx Feeder
- Number built: 61(February 2026)

History
- Introduction date: May 9, 2022
- First flight: May 17, 2020

The Cessna 408 SkyCourier is an American utility aircraft designed and built by the Cessna division of Textron Aviation. It was launched on November 28, 2017, with an order for 50 from FedEx Express, with the aircraft designed for the needs of its FedEx Feeder service.

It made its first flight on May 17, 2020, and was type certified on March 11, 2022. FedEx took delivery of the first production model on May 9, 2022.

The SkyCourier is a twin-turboprop, high-wing monoplane, available as a 19-passenger regional airliner, a cargo variant that can carry three LD3 unit load devices, and a combi version with 9 passenger seats and a rear-cabin cargo area.

The non-pressurized design is built from aluminium and is equipped with Pratt & Whitney Canada PT6A engines and fixed landing gear. The 19,000-pound (8,600 kg) MTOW airplane can cruise up to 210 knots (390 km/h; 240 mph), with a range of 386 nautical miles (715 km; 444 mi) with 19 passengers.

== Development ==
The Model 408 was launched on November 28, 2017, by Textron Aviation, with an introduction planned for 2020, as a FAR Part 23 type certified design. Like the earlier Cessna 208 Caravan, the 408's design was developed with FedEx Express to match the needs of FedEx Feeder service; FedEx requested an aircraft that could haul 6,000 lb (2,700 kg), twice the payload of the 208, and could accommodate entire LD3 sized unit load devices.

FedEx Express was the launch customer, with an order of "50 cargo aircraft and options for 50 more". Its unit cost then was $5.5 million.

Initial wind tunnel tests were completed in March 2018. The first flight was originally planned for 2019 and first deliveries anticipated in 2020. FedEx initially planned to take monthly deliveries over four years starting in 2020, and a similar pace for a second batch, if it agrees to that option. A full-scale mockup of the 19-passenger cabin was displayed at the October 2018 National Business Aviation Association convention.

The mating of the wing and fuselage of the first aircraft was completed in December 2019. By March 2020, initial ground testing was completed, checking the fuel system, engines, avionics interfaces and electrical systems. The first flight was completed on May 17, 2020, operating from Beech Factory Airport for a 2-hour and 15-minute flight. The prototype aircraft, a passenger version, along with five additional flight and ground test articles, was used for testing leading to certification. The second prototype, a freighter version which first flew in August 2020, was the first production-conforming aircraft and was used for testing the engines, propellers, environmental controls and avionics. A third test aircraft first flew in September 2020.

In April 2021, the company anticipated that certification would be completed by year's end and initial deliveries would occur in spring/summer 2022. The SkyCourier made its first public appearance at the EAA AirVenture in Oshkosh in 2021.

By early 2022, the three test aircraft had accumulated over 2,100 flight hours as the first production aircraft for FedEx was rolled out on February 3, 2022. Cessna was aiming for certification in the first half of the year before first delivery later in 2022. Federal Aviation Administration type certification was granted on March 11, 2022, after 2,100 hours of flight tests. Certification by the National Civil Aviation Agency of Brazil was granted on August 8, 2023. Certification was awarded by the Civil Aviation Authority of the Philippines (CAAP) in August 2024, and Transport Canada Civil Aviation granted certification of the type in December 2024.

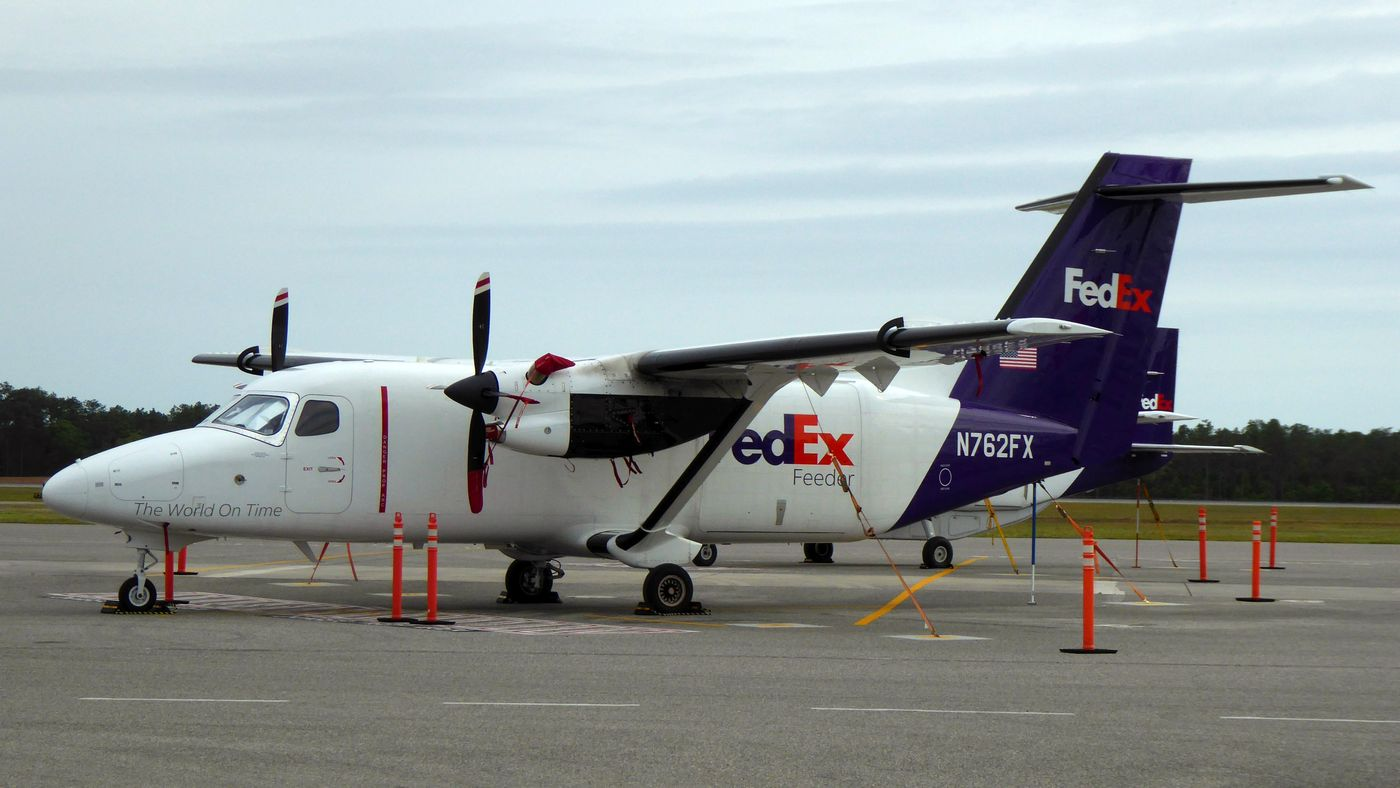
Cessna SkyCourier owned by FedEx Feeder and operated by Mountain Air Cargo.

The first production aircraft was delivered to FedEx Express in May 2022. Mountain Air Cargo, which operates flights for FedEx, operated the first revenue flight of the type on January 3, 2023.

In February 2023, a gravel runway operations kit was approved for the aircraft. In 2023, its equipped price was $7.195M for the freighter and $7.745M for the passenger version.

The first 19-seat passenger variant was delivered in April 2023 for use by Western Aircraft, Inc. doing business in Hawaii as Lāna’i Air.

In 2024, the price was $8.35M for the passenger variant and $7.75M for the cargo variant.

The Belgian Air Force is set to become the first military customer for the type, as in February 2026, they announced they have selected the Skycourier for its Special Forces aviation. Five aircraft are to be on order.

== Design ==
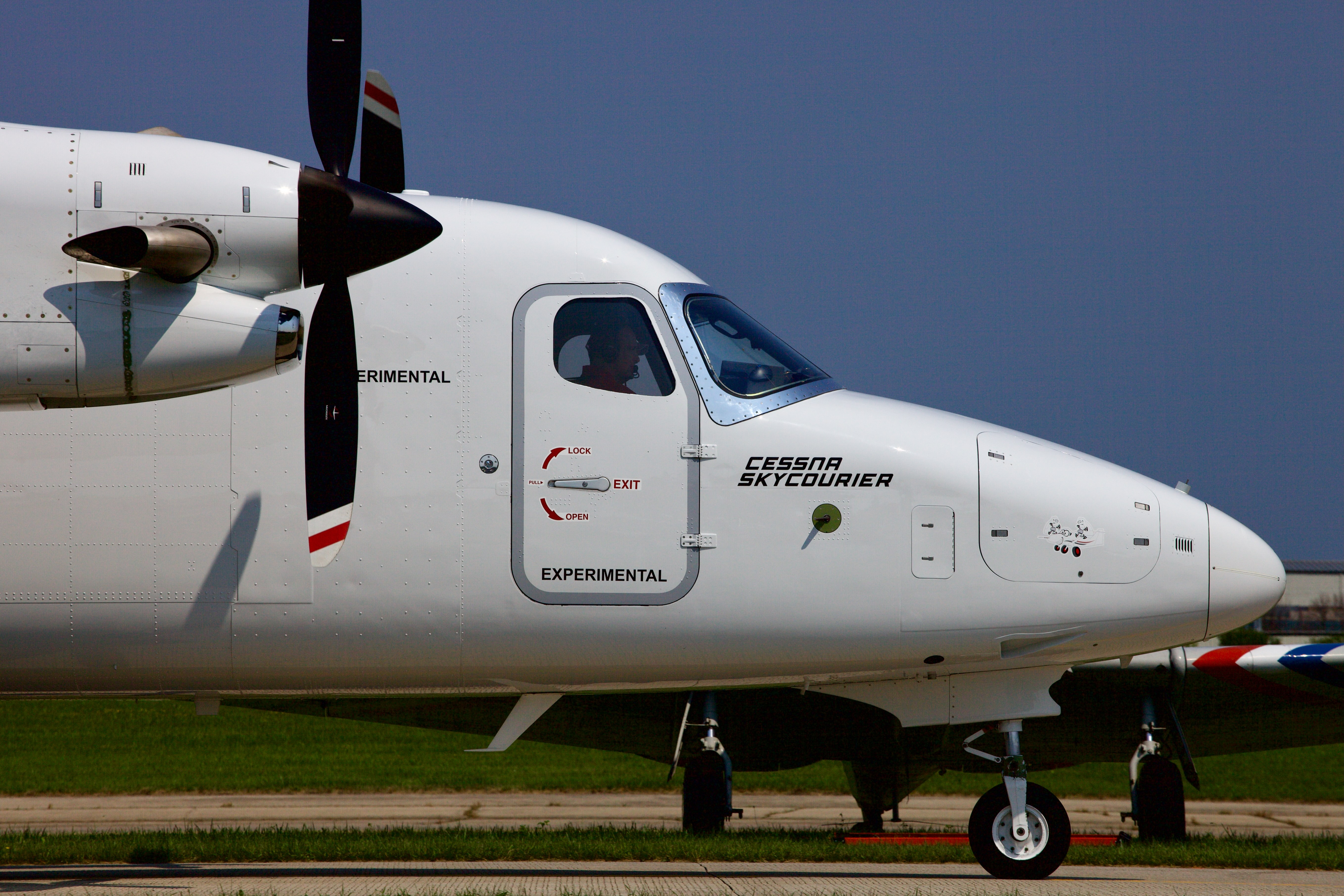
Forward section of the SkyCourier prototype.

The SkyCourier is a twin-turboprop, high-wing, utility aircraft. It is available in a 19-passenger variant with large cabin windows and separate crew and passenger doors, or in a cargo variant sized for three LD3s and 6,000 lb (2,700 kg) of payload, featuring a "large cargo door and a flat floor cabin". Its cruise speed is up to 200 kn (370 km/h; 230 mph), with a maximum range of 900 nmi (1,700 km; 1,000 mi). It also includes a single-point refueling system which reduces turnaround times.

The aircraft was designed to offer better cabin flexibility, payload capability, superior performance, and lower operating costs than its competitors; notably, the cabin was designed to accommodate heavier and bulkier cargo than comparable new aircraft.

The airframe consists of traditional aluminum materials and is equipped with Pratt & Whitney Canada PT6A-65 engines, fixed landing gear and Garmin G1000 avionics. The non-pressurized cabin is 70 in (178 cm) tall and wide, with a flat floor and an 87 in (221 cm) cargo door. The cabin of the passenger version is designed for quick conversion to a freight configuration; using patented quick-release fixtures, two people can remove the passenger seats and interior bulkheads in about one hour. Pneumatic deicing boots, along with icing sensors, are an option.

In September 2026 Cessna announced the SkyCourier UX, a concept of an autonomous cargo version with software provided by Merlin Inc. Possibilities being explored include replacing the cockpit with extra cargo space and a nose-loading door, kneeling landing gear, and integrated loading systems.

== Operational history ==
As of February 2026, a total of 61 model 408s were registered in the United States with the Federal Aviation Administration. 13 SkyCouriers were delivered during 2024.

In January 2026, Jamaica placed an order for two Cessna 408 SkyCourier aircraft for light tactical transport missions. This was the first government order for this aircraft model. A few days later, also in January 2026, Belgium placed its second military order for five aircraft to support its special operations.

== Variants ==
Freighter (408F)
Version to carry cargo including three LD3 containers. A roller mat floor is optional.

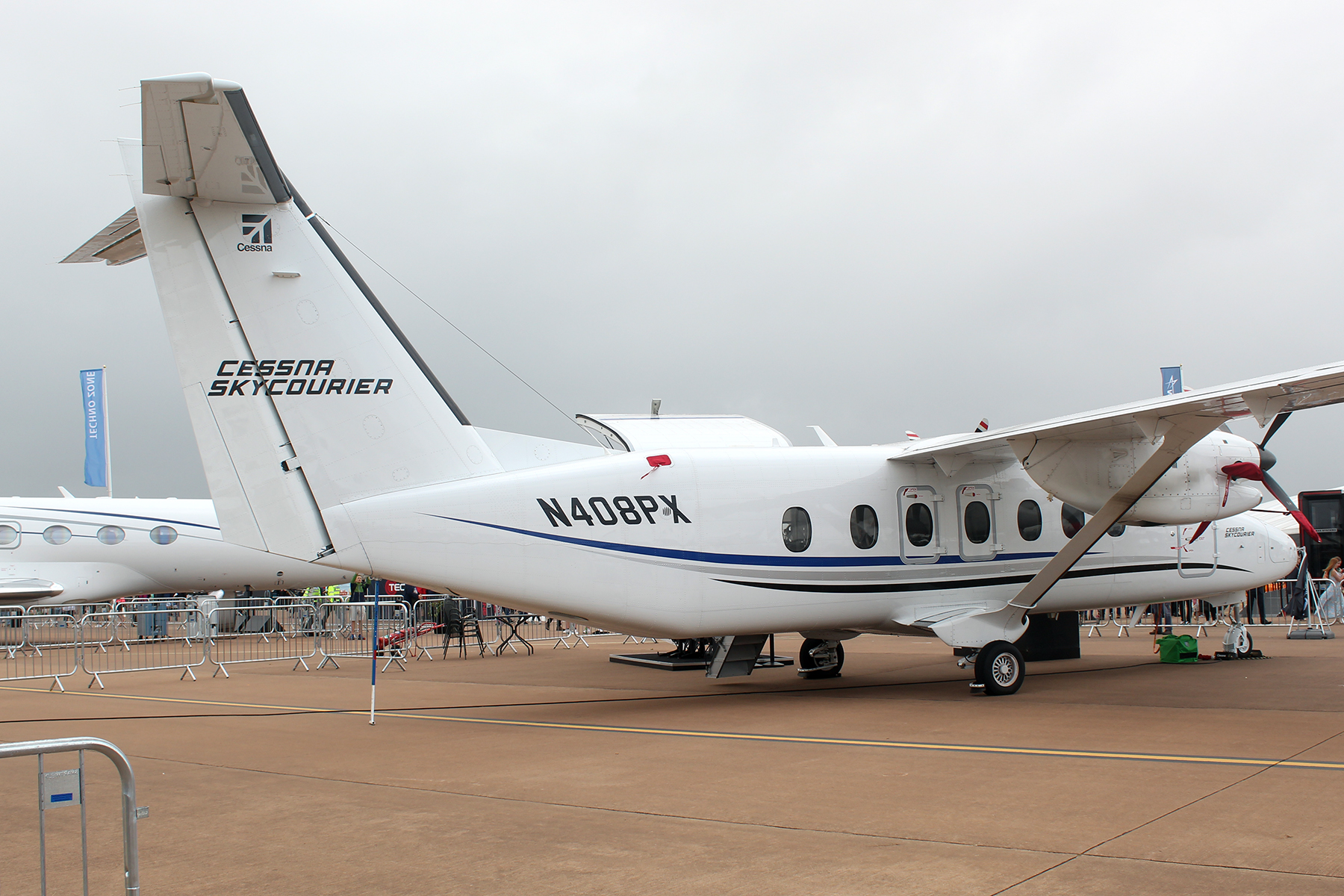
SkyCourier Passenger version prototype N408PX.

Passenger (408P)
Version with passenger windows, can be fitted with 19 passenger seats, with a baggage compartment at the rear of the cabin. It has a built-in rear airstair and three under-wing emergency exits. Optionally, seats can be fitted which are quickly removable to allow conversion to carry freight, for example for overnight cargo operations.

Combi (408C)
This is an option for the passenger version which enables nine passengers to be accommodated at the front of the cabin and freight to be loaded at the rear. A freighter option allows for all-freight operation as well. It gained US FAA certification in May 2024 and the first example was delivered to Everts Air two months later.

Special missions
In 2023 Textron announced that it was developing a special missions variant. This would include four underwing hardpoints plus two inboard stations for additional fuel tanks. Stations would be provided for external sensors, and the nose baggage compartment modified to accommodate a retractable electro-optical and infrared sensor pod. The engine starter/generators would be upgraded to power the extra electrical equipment. Mission kits would also include three stacking stretchers plus two critical care berths for medevac missions. The fuselage can be fitted with sideways-facing troop seats, and the main door can be modified for parachuting and para-dropping. The in-flight operable door was formally announced in April 2026. A demonstrator aircraft was due to fly in 2024.

== Operators ==
- Africair (Miami, US) – One passenger version operating as Textron demonstrator in Africa.
- Air Bravo (Canadian operator) – One freighter variant entered service in early 2025
- Air Marshall Islands – Two passenger variants ordered in November 2024. The first was delivered in May 2026.
- Altair, the aviation subsidiary of Mexican freight transport company FlexCoah, received one freighter version in late December 2025.
- Azul Conecta - The first of two of the passenger variants ordered was delivered in late September 2026.
- Baron Aviation Services – Operates 2 freighter versions on behalf of FedEx Express as of October 2026.
- Bering Air – Four freighter versions in service as of June 2025.
- Cleiton Táxi Aéreo – One combi version delivered in June 2025, with another due in 2026. Launch operator in Latin America.
- Collier Mosquito Control District (Florida, US) – One aircraft, delivered in June 2026. and registered to them in September 2026.
- Corporate Air – Operating ten freighter variants as of July 2026 on behalf of FedEx Express.
- Empire Airlines – Operating freighter variants on behalf of FedEx Express. Six aircraft delivered as of June 2025.
- Everts Air – Operating one freighter and one combi as of January 2025.
- FedEx Express – Launch customer, 50 ordered. First delivery May 2022, 41 delivered as of September 2026.
- Kamaka Air (Hawaii) – One freighter aircraft delivered as of June 2025.

Leading Edge SkyCourier

- Leading Edge Air Services Corporation (LEASCOR), part of ACDI Multipurpose Cooperative in the Philippines, operates one passenger variant which entered service in June 2026.
- Morningstar Air Express – As of February 2026 four freighter variants operating for FedEx Express.
- Mountain Air Cargo – First freighter operator, on behalf of FedEx Express. 14 aircraft in service as of July 2026.
- Paraguayan Air Force – One passenger version delivered in early October 2026.
- Personas y Paquetes por Aire, trading in Mexico as USMX AirLink – Operates one freighter variant as of October 2026.
- Saeta Perú – One passenger version delivered in November 2026
- Samaritan's Purse – One combi version delivered to Alaska in October 2024, with two more on order.
- Tassili Travail Aérien (TTA) (Algeria) – Two passenger versions for aero-medical transport delivered in November 2026, the first operator in Africa.
- Thailand Department of Royal Rainmaking and Agricultural Aviation (KASET) – Two of the passenger version delivered in spring 2026.
- Western Aircraft, Inc. doing business in Hawaii as Lanai Air – First passenger operator. As of August 2026 they operate three passenger variants and two freighters, with a further aircraft on order.

=== Orders ===
- Aerus – Two passenger variants on order as of December 2022.
- Belgian Air Force – 5 aircraft on order for Special Forces operations (to be modified in Belgium by Sabena Engineering).
- Hinterland Aviation – Two passenger variants ordered in February 2024.
- Hunnu Air – Two passenger variants ordered in August 2025, delivery in 2026.
- Titan Airways – Two combis ordered in February 2024.

== Specifications ==
Data from Cessna.

General characteristics

- Capacity: 19 passengers/5,000 lb (2,268 kg) payload (commuter) or 3×LD3s/6,000 lb (2,722 kg) payload (cargo)
- Length: 55 ft 1 in (16.80 m)
- Wingspan: 72 ft 3 in (22.02 m)
- Height: 20 ft 8 in (6.30 m)
- Wing area: 441.0 sq ft (40.97 m^{2})
- Aspect ratio: 11.8
- Empty weight: 12,325 lb (5,591 kg) , Freighter: 11,000 lb (4,990 kg)
- Max takeoff weight: 19,000 lb (8,618 kg)
- Fuel capacity: 4,826 lb (2,189 kg) / 720 gal (2,725 L)
- Powerplant: 2 × Pratt & Whitney Canada PT6A-65SC turboprop, 1,110 hp (830 kW) each
- Propellers: 4-bladed McCauley Blackmac aluminum, auto feathering, reverse

Performance

- Cruise speed: 210 kn (240 mph, 390 km/h) maximum
- Range: 386 nmi (444 mi, 715 km) with 19 passengers, LRC, 100nmi IFR reserves, FL100
- Ferry range: 920 nmi (1,060 mi, 1,700 km)
- Service ceiling: 25,000 ft (7,600 m)
- Takeoff Distance : 3,660 ft (1,116 m)

== See also ==
Aircraft of comparable role, configuration, and era

- Aircraft Industries L 410 NG
- De Havilland Canada DHC-6 Twin Otter
- Desaer ATL-100
- Dornier 228NG
- Harbin Y-12F
- Indonesian Aerospace N-219
- PZL M28 Skytruck
