= Maiden High School =

American public school in North Carolina

Location
- 600 West Main Street; Maiden, North Carolina 28650; United States; 35°34′49″N 81°13′33″W

Information
- Type: Public
- Motto: Teach, Learn & Lead for the Future.
- Established: 1953 (73 years ago)
- School district: Catawba County Schools
- CEEB code: 342460
- Principal: Brian Hefner
- Teaching staff: 49.46 (FTE)
- Grades: 9–12
- Enrollment: 879 (2023-2024)
- Student to teacher ratio: 17.77
- Colors: Blue and white
- Athletics: NCHSAA 4A
- Athletics conference: Western Foothills 4A/5A
- Mascot: Blue Devil
- Nickname: Blue Devils
- Website: maidenhs.catawbaschools.net

Maiden High School is a public high school located in Maiden, North Carolina, United States. It is part of the Catawba County Schools district.

== Overview ==
Maiden High School was founded in 1953. In 2006, Maiden High moved from its former older building (which is now Maiden Middle School), to a newly built campus, which houses its current location. The school contains an auditorium, auxiliary gym, main gym, auto shop, wood shop, and a culinary arts shop. The school consists of a main circle, with 7 halls branching out. Maiden High School operates on a four block schedule. Each block is an hour and thirty-five minutes long.

== Athletics ==
Maiden is a part of the North Carolina High School Athletic Association (NCHSAA) and are classified as a 4A school. The school is a member of the Western Foothills 4A/5A Conference. Maiden's school colors are blue and white, and its team name is the Blue Devils. Sports at Maiden include:

- Baseball
- Basketball
- Cheerleading
- Cross Country
- Football
- Golf
- Marching Band
- Soccer
- Softball
- Swimming
- Tennis
- Track & Field
- Volleyball
- Wrestling

== Notable alumni ==
- Cherie Berry, former politician and North Carolina Commissioner of Labor
- Caleb Farley, NFL cornerback
- Kevin Wilson, college football coach
