= William Pinckney Reinhardt House =

Historic house in North Carolina, United States

- U.S. National Register of Historic Places
- Location within North Carolina Location within the United States
- Location: Junction of SR 2012 and SR 2013, near Maiden, North Carolina
- Coordinates: 35°36′20″N 81°14′15″W
- Area: less than one acre
- Built: 1845
- Architectural style: Greek Revival
- MPS: Catawba County MPS
- NRHP reference No.: 90001111
- Added to NRHP: July 19, 1990

William Pinckney Reinhardt House, also known as the Pink Reinhardt House, Reinhardt-Sigmon House, and Sigmon House, is a historic home located near Maiden, Catawba County, North Carolina. It was built about 1845, and is a two-story, Greek Revival style frame dwelling. The front facade features center bay portico supported by two stuccoed-brick Doric order columns and a sophisticated Asher Benjamin-inspired doorway. It has a 1 1/2-story frame addition built in the 1920s. It is nearly identical to the neighboring Franklin D. Reinhardt House.

It was listed on the National Register of Historic Places in 1990.
