= David F. Propst House =

Historic house in North Carolina, United States

- U.S. National Register of Historic Places
- Location within North Carolina Location within the United States
- Location: Junction of SR 1810 and SR 1878, near Maiden, North Carolina
- Coordinates: 35°35′51″N 81°11′8″W
- Area: 3 acres (1.2 ha)
- Built: c. 1887
- Architectural style: Late Victorian, Vernacular Late Victorian
- MPS: Catawba County MPS
- NRHP reference No.: 90000864
- Added to NRHP: June 21, 1990

David F. Propst House is a historic home located near Maiden, Catawba County, North Carolina. It was built about 1887, and is a two-story, single pile, brick, vernacular Late Victorian style dwelling. It has an original one-story brick rear ell and a gable roof with boxed eaves.

It was listed on the National Register of Historic Places in 1990.
