= Lanai Airlines =

Hawaiian airline

Lānaʻi Airlines

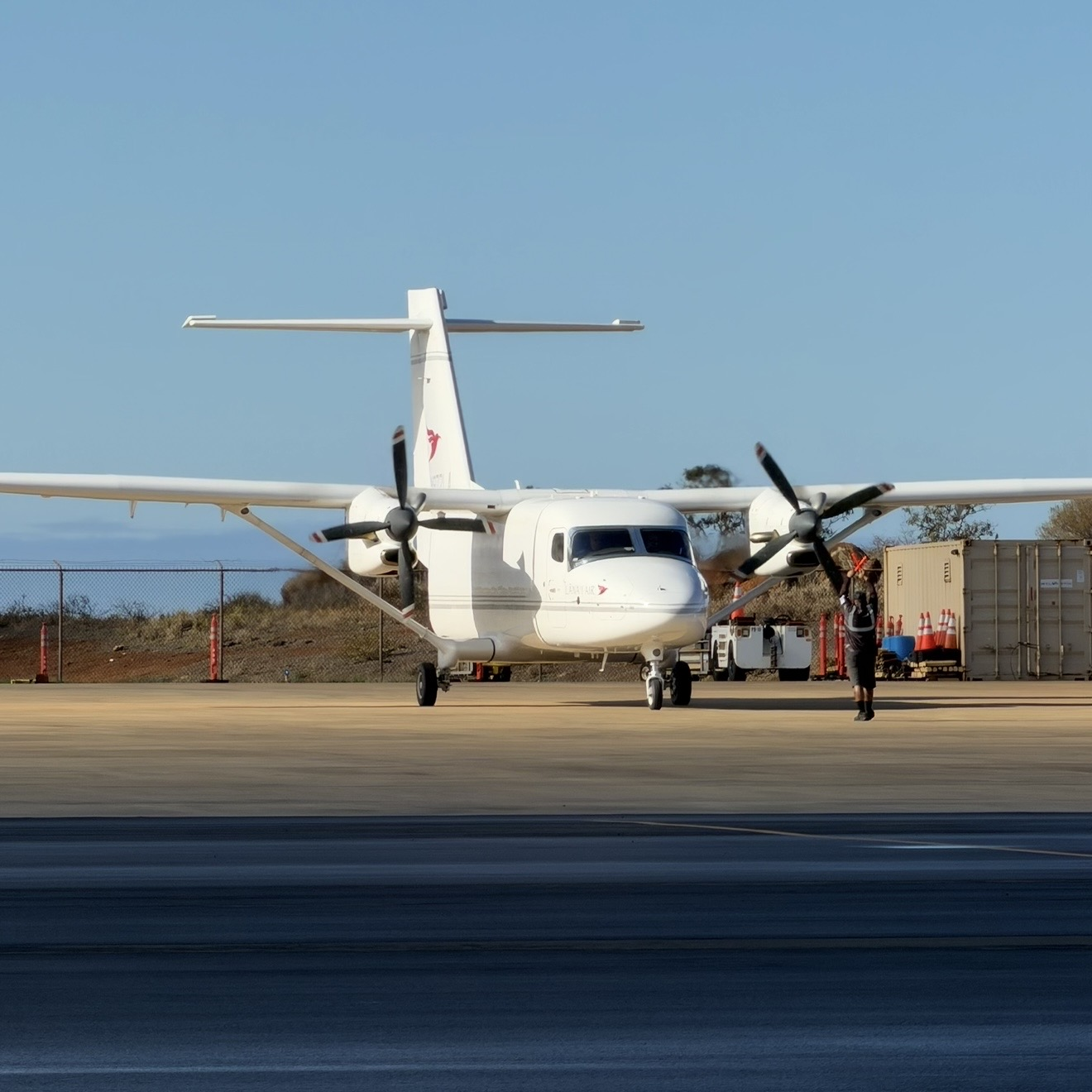
- Lana’i Air CE-408 Freighter
IATA	ICAO	Call sign
ST	STT	Sawtooth
- Founded: 2018
- Hubs: Honolulu; Lānaʻi
- Focus cities: Lāna’i
- Fleet size: 10+
- Destinations: 3
- Parent company: Western Aircraft, Inc.
- Headquarters: Honolulu, Hawaii
- Key people: Larry Ellison (Owner)
- Website: www.lanaiair.com

Lānaʻi Airlines, operating under the name Lānaʻi Air, is an air service in Hawaii providing scheduled and private charter flights between Lānaʻi and other Hawaiian islands. It was established in 2018 as a private charter service between Honolulu and Lānaʻi, initially using Pilatus PC-12 aircraft operated by Mokulele Airlines in partnership with the Four Seasons Resort Lānaʻi. Operations were later transferred to Western Aircraft.

As of 2026, its scheduled destinations were Lānaʻi City, Honolulu, and Kaunakakai, while its private charter destinations were Kahului, Kona, and Lihue. Its fleet comprised Pilatus PC-12 and Cessna 408 SkyCourier aircraft.

== History ==
Lānaʻi Air was established as a luxury private charter service in 2018 to offer direct air access to Lānaʻi, particularly for resort travelers and visitors seeking convenient island connections without the crowds and delays of larger commuter flights. The service was originally operated using Pilatus PC-12 aircraft under the leadership of Mokulele Airlines in partnership with Four Seasons Resort Lānaʻi, providing charter flights between Honolulu and Lānaʻi. In later years, operations were handed over to Western Aircraft, Inc. under the trade name Lānaʻi Air, while Lānaʻi Resorts, LLC licenses the brand for public charter services.

== Destinations ==
As of 2026, Lānaʻi Air operates scheduled and private charter services to the following destinations within Hawaii:

=== Scheduled Service ===
- Lānaʻi City – Lanai Airport
- Honolulu – Daniel K. Inouye International Airport
- Kaunakakai - Moloka’i Airport

=== Private Charter Service ===
- Kahului – Kahului Airport
- Kona – Kona International Airport
- Lihue - Lihue Airport

Lānaʻi Air primarily focuses on inter-island connectivity, offering direct charter and commuter flights between Lānaʻi and major Hawaiian islands.

== Fleet ==
Lānaʻi Air operates a small fleet of turboprop aircraft suited for short inter-island hops:

- 5 Pilatus PC-12
- 5 Cessna 408 SkyCourier

== Services and Customer Experience ==
Passengers on Lānaʻi Air flights typically receive a seamless travel experience that may include expedited check-in and boarding, luxury ground transport to destinations such as the Four Seasons Resort Lānaʻi, and private lounge features at charter terminals.

Although based in Honolulu for operational purposes, the airline's primary purpose is to support regional inter-island transportation in Hawaii with an emphasis on comfort and convenience.
