= Lanai Airport =

Lanai Airport Kahua Mokulele o Lāna‘i
- IATA: LNY; ICAO: PHNY; FAA LID: LNY

Summary
- Airport type: Public
- Owner/Operator: Hawaii Department of Transportation
- Serves: Lanai
- Elevation AMSL: 1,308 ft (399 m)
- Coordinates: 20°47′08″N 156°57′05″W
- Website: hawaii.gov/lny

Map
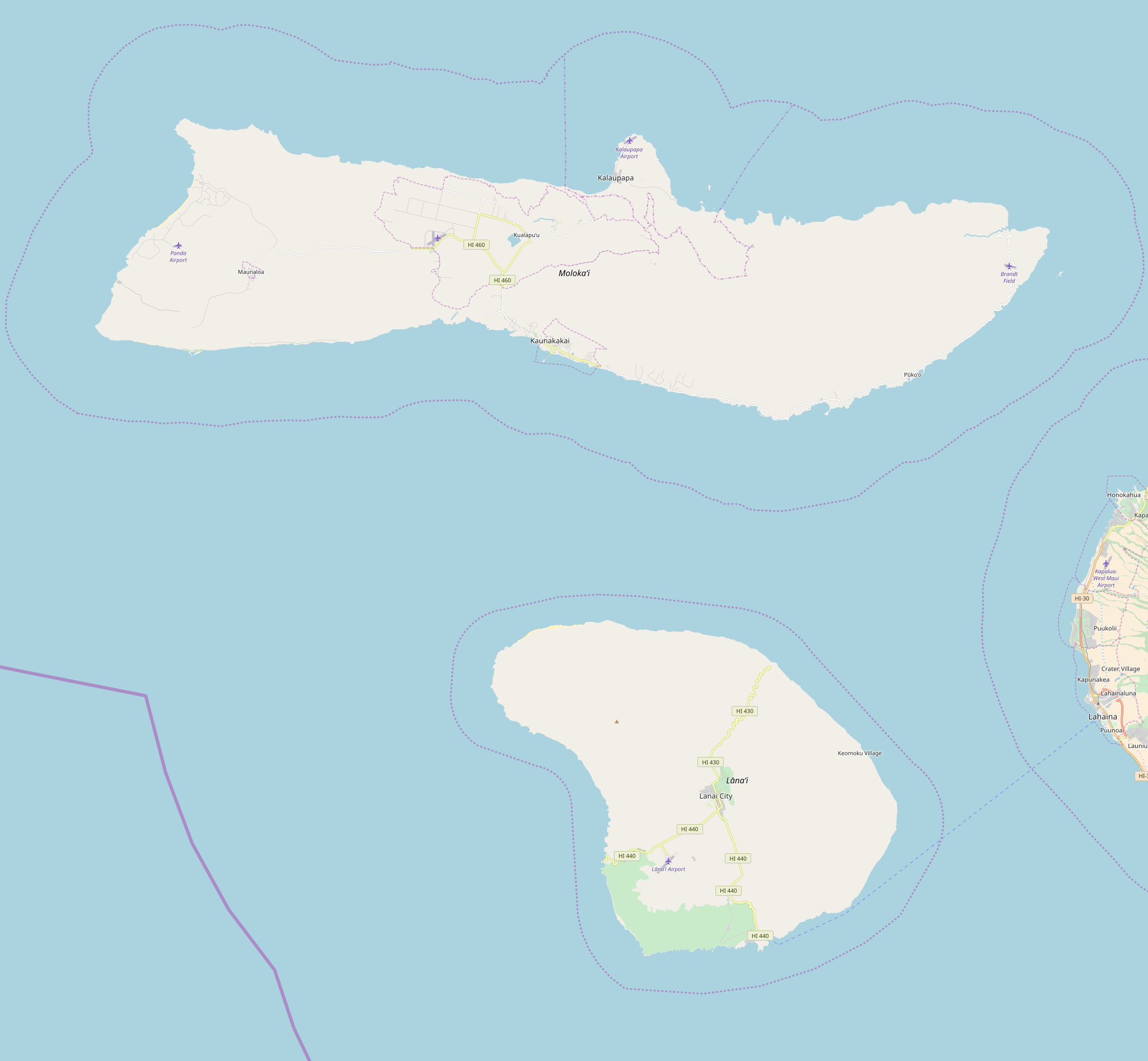
- Location of airport in Hawaii LNY (Hawaii)

Runways
Direction	Length		Surface
Direction	ft	m	Surface
3/21	5,001	1,524	Asphalt

Statistics (2016)
- Aircraft operations: 6,326
- Source: Federal Aviation Administration

Lanai Airport (IATA: LNY, ICAO: PHNY, FAA LID: LNY), also written as Lānaʻi Airport, is a state-owned public-use airport located three nautical miles or about 3.4 miles (5.5 km) southwest of the central business district of Lanai City (Lānaʻi City), in Maui County, Hawaii. The airport began regular operations in 1930. It is the only airport serving the island of Lanai (Lānaʻi).

It is included in the Federal Aviation Administration (FAA) National Plan of Integrated Airport Systems for 2021–2025, in which it is categorized as a non-hub primary commercial service facility.

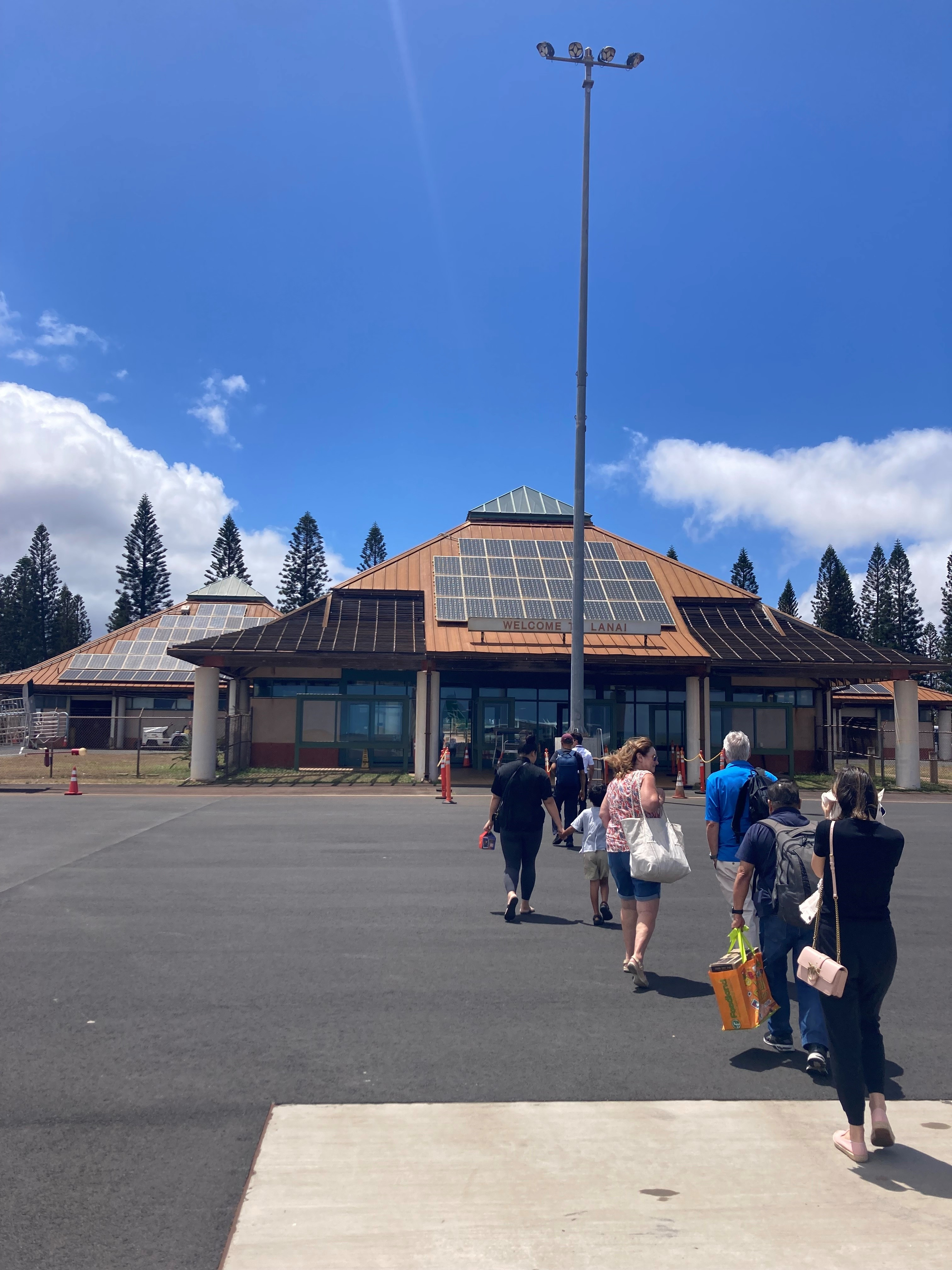
Lanai Airport tarmac deplaning into terminal

== Facilities and aircraft ==
The airport covers an area of 505 acres (204 ha) at an elevation of 1,308 feet (399 m) above mean sea level. It has one runway designated 3/21 with an asphalt surface measuring 5,001 by 150 feet (1,524 x 46 m).

For the 12-month period ending July 31, 2016, the airport had 6,326 aircraft operations, an average of 17 per day: 65% air taxi, 25% scheduled commercial, 9% general aviation and 1% military. In April 2022, there were no aircraft based at this airport.

The airport is served by a single commercial airline, Mokulele Airlines with the Cessna 208B Grand Caravan EX.

== Airlines and destinations ==
Lanai Airport is connected to Honolulu International Airport by Lanai Airlines and Mokulele Airlines, and to Kahului Airport by Mokulele Airlines.

The government of Hawaii did not charge landing fees from March 2021, to help during the pandemic.

== Statistics ==
=== Top destinations ===
Busiest domestic routes from LNY (July 2025 – June 2026)
Rank	City	Passengers	Carriers
1	Honolulu, Hawaii	47,000	Lanai, Mokulele
2	Kahului, Hawaii	4,810	Mokulele

== Accidents and incidents ==
- February 26, 2014: A chartered twin-engine Piper PA-31 Navajo aircraft operated by Maui Air crashed after takeoff from Lanai Airport one mile away. The plane was carrying a pilot and five employees of Maui County. The pilot and two passengers were killed, while the other three passengers were injured.

== See also ==
- List of airports in Hawaii
