= Maiden, North Carolina =

- Town
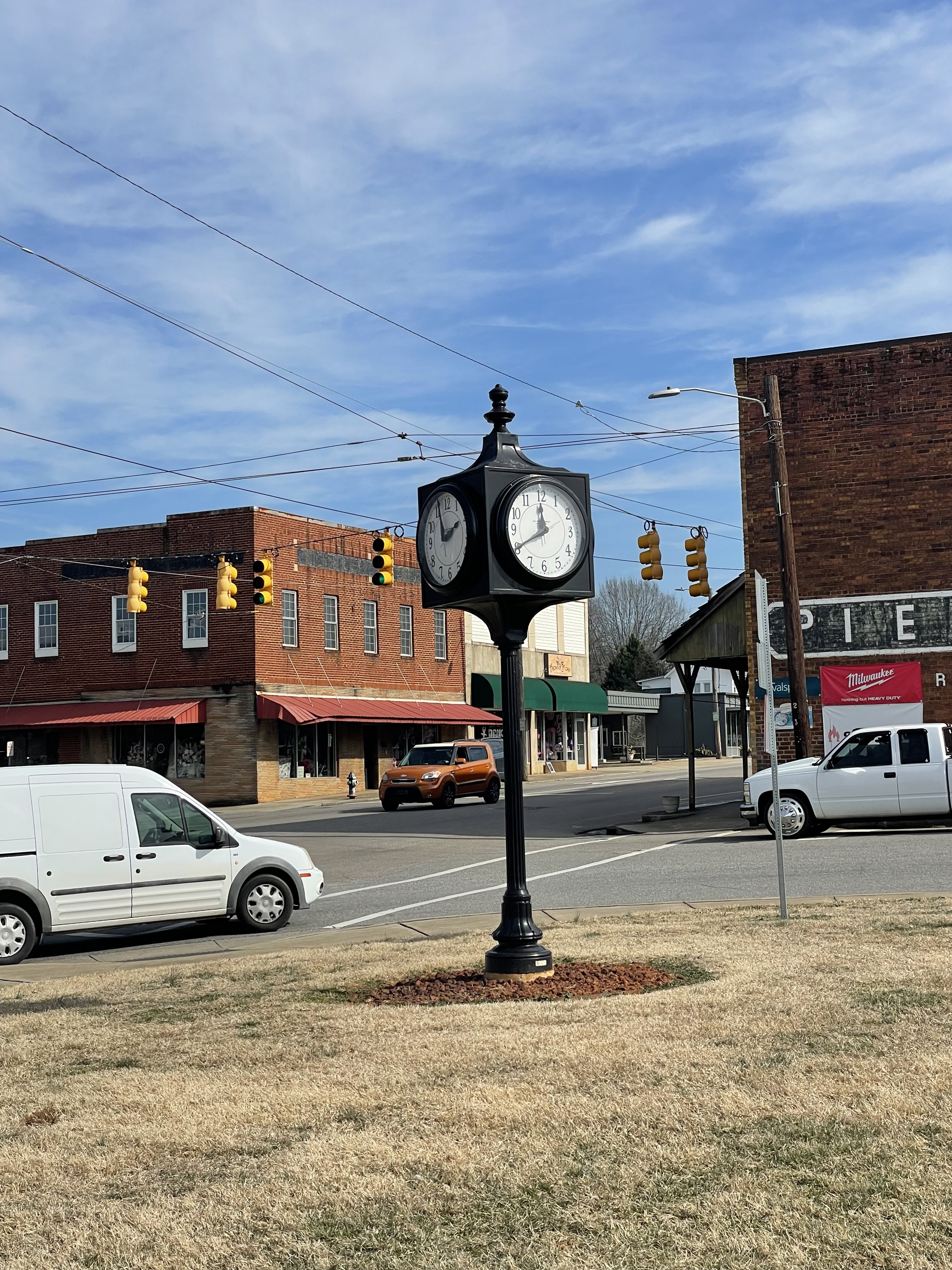
- Downtown Maiden

- Flag Seal Logo
- Motto(s): "A town with a future" "Biggest little football town in the world"
- Location within the state of North Carolina
- Coordinates: 35°35′11″N 81°15′35″W
- Country: United States
- State: North Carolina
- Counties: Catawba, Lincoln

Government
  - Mayor: Max A. Bumgarner Jr.

Area
  - Total: 6.25 sq mi (16.20 km^{2})
  - Land: 6.19 sq mi (16.03 km^{2})
  - Water: 0.066 sq mi (0.17 km^{2})
- Elevation: 833 ft (254 m)

Population (2020)
  - Total: 3,736
  - Density: 604/sq mi (233.1/km^{2})
- Time zone: UTC-5 (Eastern (EST))
  - Summer (DST): UTC-4 (EDT)
- ZIP code: 28650
- Area code: 828
- FIPS code: 37-40660
- GNIS feature ID: 2406081
- Website: www.maidennc.com

Maiden is a town in Catawba and Lincoln counties in the U.S. state of North Carolina. The population was 3,845 at the 2023 census.

Maiden High School was the first public high school in the state with an observatory and is currently home to an Apple iCloud Data Center, covering 500,000 square feet (46,000 m^{2}). In May 2012, Apple announced it would generate 60 percent of the Maiden facility's power itself, through a large deployment of fuel cells at the site and a 100-acre (40 ha) solar farm, with an additional 150-acre (61 ha) site 2 miles (3 km) away.

The Catawba County portion of Maiden is part of the Hickory-Lenoir-Morganton, NC Metropolitan Statistical Area, while the Lincoln County portion is part of the Charlotte-Concord-Gastonia, NC-SC Metropolitan Statistical Area.

== History ==
Maiden was incorporated on March 7, 1883, as a cotton mill site and trading center. The town is named from a creek north of the area called "Maiden Creek". The name of the creek is thought to be of Native American origin. Historians claim that the name "Maiden" stems from the native-grown "Maidencane" grass, which is found throughout the town to this day.

The town also calls itself "The Biggest Little Football Town in the World", because of the strong community support for its local high school football team.

The David F. Propst House, Memorial Reformed Church, Miller–Cansler House, Franklin D. Reinhardt and Harren–Hood Farms, William Pinckney Reinhardt House, and Salem Union Church and Cemetery are listed on the National Register of Historic Places.

== Geography ==
Maiden is located in southern Catawba County, with a small portion extending south into Lincoln County. U.S. Route 321 Business passes through the center of town as Main Street, while current U.S. Route 321, a four-lane expressway, runs southwest of the town, with access from Exit 33 west of the town and from Exit 28 in Lincoln County. Via US 321 it is 16 miles (26 km) northwest to Hickory and 23 miles (37 km) south to Gastonia.

According to the United States Census Bureau, the town of Maiden has a total area of 5.6 square miles (14.5 km^{2}), of which 5.5 square miles (14.3 km^{2}) is land and 0.077 square miles (0.2 km^{2}), or 1.22%, is water.

== Demographics ==
Historical population
Census	Pop.	Note	%±
1890	264		—
1900	614		132.6%
1910	664		8.1%
1920	1,266		90.7%
1930	1,628		28.6%
1940	1,803		10.7%
1950	1,952		8.3%
1960	2,039		4.5%
1970	2,416		18.5%
1980	2,574		6.5%
1990	2,574		0.0%
2000	3,282		27.5%
2010	3,310		0.9%
2020	3,736		12.9%
U.S. Decennial Census

=== 2020 census ===
As of the 2020 census, Maiden had a population of 3,736. The median age was 39.8 years. 22.4% of residents were under the age of 18 and 15.9% were 65 years of age or older. For every 100 females, there were 111.3 males, and for every 100 females age 18 and over, there were 112.6 males.

94.7% of residents lived in urban areas, while 5.3% lived in rural areas.

There were 1,392 households in Maiden, of which 33.8% had children under the age of 18 living in them. Of all households, 46.0% were married-couple households, 17.7% were households with a male householder and no spouse or partner present, and 27.9% were households with a female householder and no spouse or partner present. About 26.8% of all households were made up of individuals, and 13.3% had someone living alone who was 65 years of age or older.

There were 1,493 housing units, of which 6.8% were vacant. The homeowner vacancy rate was 1.4% and the rental vacancy rate was 3.1%.

Maiden racial composition
Race	Number	Percentage
White (non-Hispanic)	2,755	73.74%
Black or African American (non-Hispanic)	417	11.16%
Native American	7	0.19%
Asian	68	1.82%
Pacific Islander	2	0.05%
Other/Mixed	171	4.58%
Hispanic or Latino	316	8.46%

=== 2010 census ===
As of the census of 2010, there were 3,327 people, 1,187 households, and 848 families residing in the town. The population density was 602.3 inhabitants per square mile (232.5/km^{2}). There were 1,258 housing units at an average density of 265.8 units per square mile (102.6 units/km^{2}). The racial makeup of the town was 80.04% White, 14.72% African American, 0.37% Native American, 0.82% Asian, 0.30% Pacific Islander, 2.71% from other races, and 1.04% from two or more races. Hispanic or Latino of any race were 5.73% of the population.

There were 1,187 households, out of which 29.3% had children under the age of 18 living with them, 55.4% were married couples living together, 11.9% had a female householder with no husband present, and 28.5% were non-families. 24.9% of all households were made up of individuals, and 11.3% had someone living alone who was 65 years of age or older. The average household size was 2.47 and the average family size was 2.95.

In the town, the population was spread out, with 21.7% under the age of 18, 9.6% from 18 to 24, 32.8% from 25 to 44, 22.5% from 45 to 64, and 13.5% who were 65 years of age or older. The median age was 36 years. For every 100 females, there were 110.0 males. For every 100 females age 18 and over, there were 112.7 males.

The median income for a household in the town was $35,417, and the median income for a family was $44,063. Males had a median income of $29,695 versus $21,594 for females. The per capita income for the town was $19,026. About 7.6% of families and 8.9% of the population were below the poverty line, including 12.7% of those under age 18 and 10.8% of those age 65 or over.

== Education ==
The portion in Catawba County (the vast majority of the municipality) is in the Catawba County Schools school district. This district operates Maiden High School.

The small portion in Lincoln County is in the Lincoln County Schools school district.

== Notable people ==
- Cherie Berry, former North Carolina Commissioner of Labor
- Dennis Hargrove Cooke, former president of what is now East Carolina University
- Caleb Farley, NFL cornerback
- Hank Parker, professional bass fisherman
- Kevin Wilson, college football coach
