= Unit load device =

Pallet or container used to load luggage, freight, and mail on aircraft

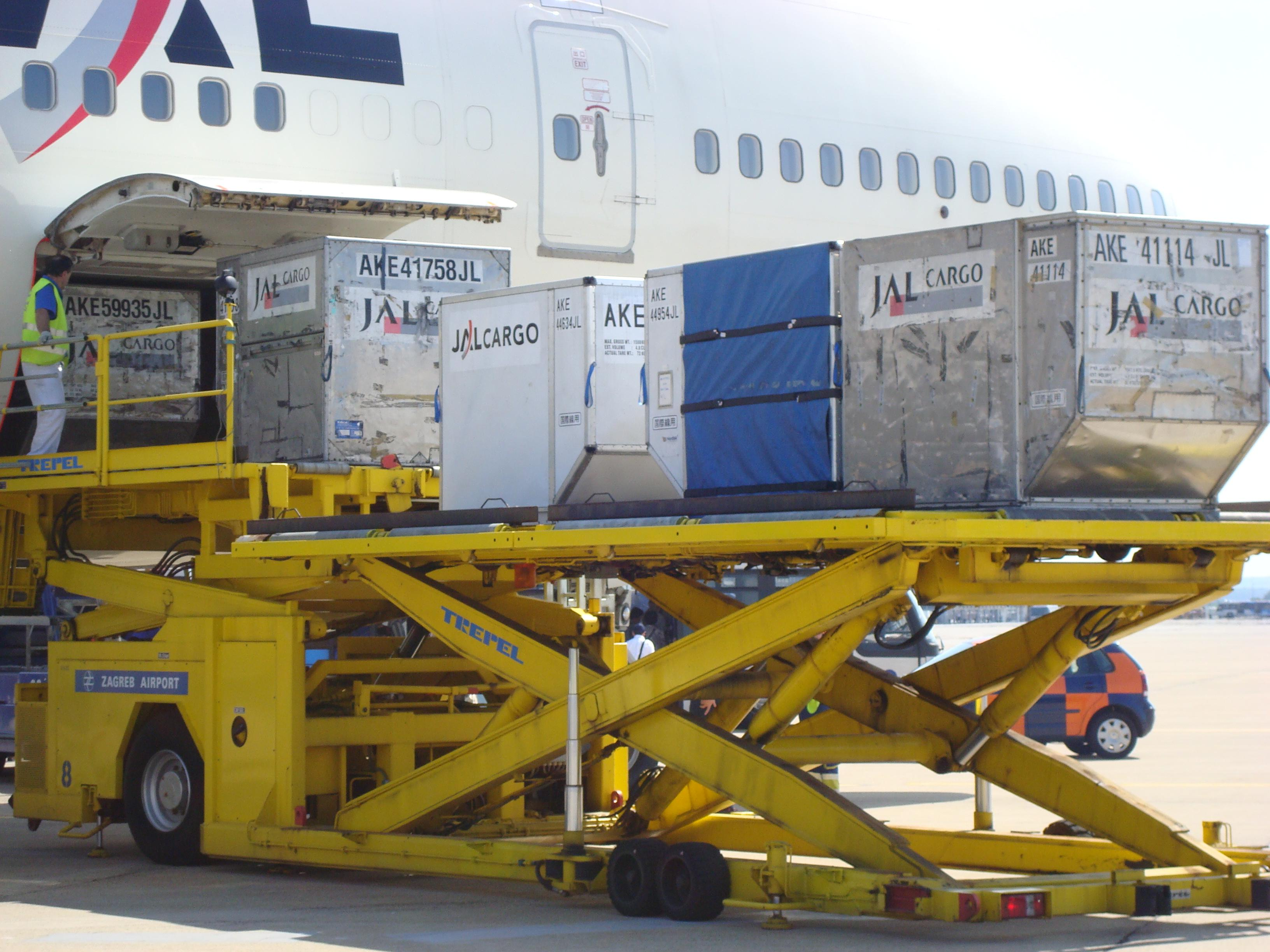
Unloading LD3 containers from a Boeing 747

A unit load device (ULD) is a container used to load luggage, freight, and mail on wide-body aircraft and specific narrow-body aircraft. It allows preloading of cargo, provided the containerised load fits in the aircraft, enabling efficient planning of aircraft weight and balance and reduced labour and time in loading aircraft holds compared with 'bulk-loading' single items of cargo or luggage by hand. Each ULD has its own packing list or manifest so that its contents can be tracked. A loaded aircraft cargo pallet secured with a cargo net also forms a ULD, but its load must be gauged for size in addition to being weighed to ensure aircraft door and hold clearances.

The IATA publishes ULD regulations and notes there are 900,000 in service worth more than US$1 billion, averaging $1100 each.

== Types ==
ULDs come in two forms: pallets and containers. ULD pallets are rugged sheets of aluminium with rims designed to lock onto cargo net lugs. ULD containers, also known as cans and pods, are closed containers often made of aluminium or a combination of aluminium (frame) and Lexan (walls) but there are examples of containers made of GRP with an insulating foam core. Depending on the nature of the goods to be transported, ULDs may have built-in refrigeration units. Examples of common ULDs and their specifics are listed below.

Lower hold containers volume in m^{3} (cu.ft), dimensions in mm (inches)
Type	Internal volume	Height	Depth	Width			Contour	IATA	Suitability
Type	Internal volume	Height	Depth	Base	Overall	Nominal	Contour	IATA	Suitability
LD3-45	3.7 (131)	1,143 (45)	1,534 (60.4)	1,562 (61.5)	2,438 (96)	Full	Double	AKH	Airbus A319/A320/A321
LD2	3.5 (124)	1,626 (64)	1,534 (60.4)	1,194 (47)	1,562 (61.5)	Half	Single	APE	Boeing widebodies
LD3	4.5 (159)	1,626 (64)	1,534 (60.4)	1,562 (61.5)	2,007 (79)	Half	Single	AKE	Airbus and Boeing widebodies, DC-10/MD-11, L-1011
LD1	5.0 (175)	1,626 (64)	1,534 (60.4)	1,562 (61.5)	2,337 (92)	Half	Single	AKC	Boeing widebodies, MD-11
LD4	5.5 (195)	1,626 (64)	1,534 (60.4)	2,438 (96)	2,438 (96)	Full	None	AQP	Boeing 767/777/787
LD8 (2×LD2)	6.9 (245)	1,626 (64)	1,534 (60.4)	2,438 (96)	3,175 (125)	Full	Double	AQF	Boeing 767/787
LD11	7.2 (256)	1,626 (64)	1,534 (60.4)	3,175 (125)	3,175 (125)	Full	None	ALP	Boeing 747, 777, 787, DC-10/MD-11
PLA pallet (Note: Flat pallet with a cargo net)	7.1 (250)	1,626 (64)	1,534 (60.4)	3,175 (125)	3,175 (125)	Full	None	PLA	747, 777, 787
LD6 (2×LD3)	8.9 (316)	1,626 (64)	1,534 (60.4)	3,175 (125)	4,064 (160)	Full	Double	ALF	747/777/787, DC-10/MD-11
LD26 (P1P base)	13.3 (470)	1,626 (64)	2,235 (88)	3,175 (125)	4,064 (160)	Full	Double	AAF	Airbus A330, A340, A350, and Boeing 747/777/787, DC-10/MD-11
LD7 winged pallet (Note: The LD-7 winged pallet adds folding wings to the P1P flat pallet to allow overhang)	14.0 (495)	1,626 (64)	2,235 (88)	3,175 (125)	4,064 (160)	Full	Double	P1P	747, 777, 787, DC-10/MD-11
LD7/P1P pallet	10.7 (379)	1,626 (64)	2,235 (88)	3,175 (125)	3,175 (125)	Full	None	P1P	All widebodies
LD9 (P1P base)	10.8 (381)	1,626 (64)	2,235 (88)	3,175 (125)	3,175 (125)	Full	None	AAP	Boeing widebodies, DC-10/MD-11
LD29 (P1P base)	14.4 (510)	1,626 (64)	2,235 (88)	3,175 (125)	4,724 (186)	Full	Double	AAU	747
LD39 (P6P base)	15.9 (560)	1,626 (64)	2,438 (96)	3,175 (125)	4,724 (186)	Full	Double	AMU	747
P6P pallet	11.5 (407) (Note: up to 21.2 m^{3} (750 ft^{3}) with a 2,997 mm (118 in) height)	1,626 (64)	2,438 (96)	3,175 (125)	3,175 (125)	Full	None	P6P	747, 767, 777, 787, DC-10, MD-11

Notes

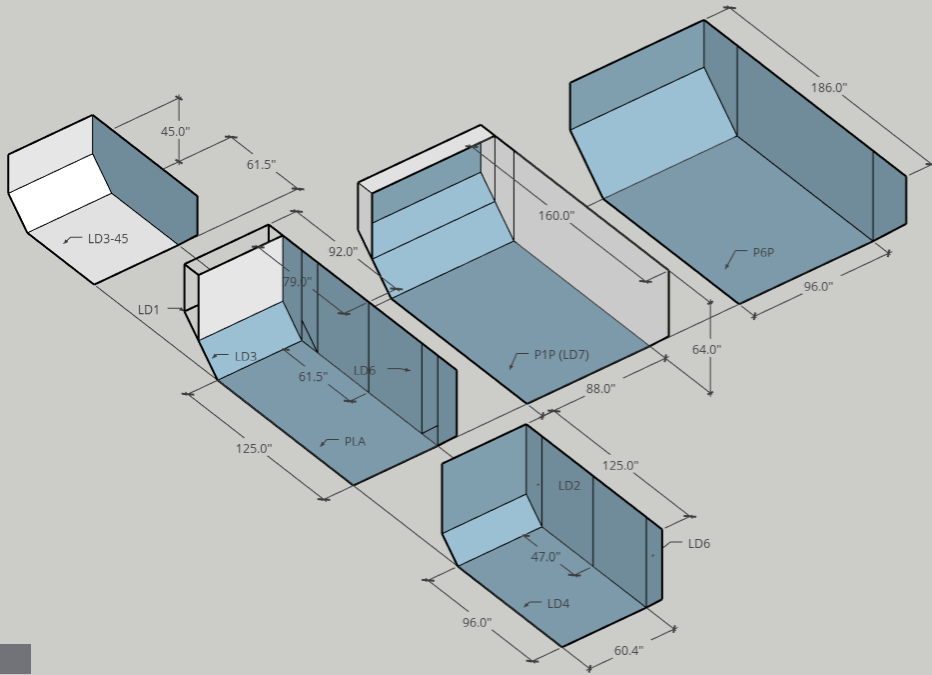
Unit load device sizes

== Aircraft compatibility ==
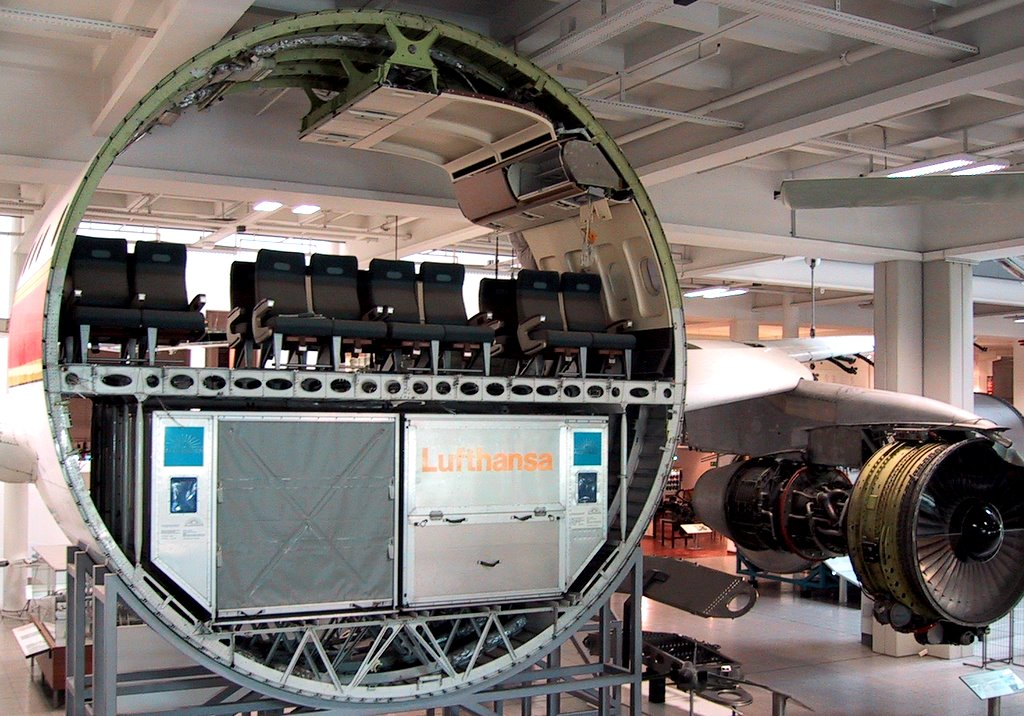
Cross-section of an Airbus A300 showing LD3 containers

LD3s, LD6s, and LD11s will fit 787s, 777s, 747s, MD-11s, Il-86s, Il-96s, L-1011s and all Airbus wide-bodies. The 767 uses the smaller LD2s and LD8s because of its narrower fuselage. The less common LD1 is designed specifically for the 747, but LD3s are more commonly used in its place because of ubiquity (they have the same floor dimensions such that one LD3 takes the place of one LD1). LD3s with reduced height (1.14 metres (45 in) instead of 1.63 metres (64 in)) can also be loaded on the Airbus A320 family. LD7 pallets will fit 787s, 777s, 747s, late model 767s (with larger doors), and Airbus wide-bodies.

Interchangeability of certain ULDs between LD3/6/11 aircraft and LD2/8 aircraft is possible when cargo needs to be quickly transferred to a connecting flight. Both LD2s and LD8s can be loaded in LD3/6/11 aircraft, but at the cost of using internal volume inefficiently (33 ft^{3} wasted per LD2). Only the LD3 of the LD3/6/11 family of ULDs can be loaded in a 767; it will occupy an entire row where two LD2s or one LD8 would otherwise have fit (90 ft^{3} wasted per LD3). Policies vary from airline to airline as to whether such transfers are allowed.

The 787, intended to replace the 767, was designed to use the LD3/6/11 family of ULDs to solve the wasted volume issue.

=== ULD capacity ===
Widebodies
Model	Lower deck			Main deck		
Model	Containers	88×125″	96×125″	96×125″	88×125″	88x108″
Airbus A300-600	22 LD3	4 + 10 LD3	4 + 10 LD3	20	21	
Airbus A310	15 LD3	3 + 7 LD3	3 + 7 LD3	15	16	
Airbus A330-2/800	26 LD3	8	8	22	23	26
Airbus A330-3/900	32 LD3	11	10	26	26	
Airbus A340-200	26 LD3	9	9			
Airbus A340-300	32 LD3	11	10			
Airbus A340-500	30 LD3	10	10			
Airbus A340-600	42 LD3	14	14			
Airbus A350-900	36 LD3	11	11			
Airbus A350F	40 LD3		12	30		
Airbus A350-1000	44 LD3	14	14			
Airbus A380-800	38 LD3	13	13			
Boeing 747 classic	30 LD1			28	28	36
Boeing 747SP	20 LD1					
Boeing 747-400	32 LD1	9 + 4 LD1	9 + 2 LD1	30	30	
Boeing 747-8/8F	40 LD1		12 + 2 LD1	34		
Boeing 767-200	22 LD2	3 + 10 LD2	3 + 10 LD2			
Boeing 767-300	30 LD2	4 + 14 LD2	4 + 14 LD2	14	16	26
Boeing 767-400	38 LD2		5 + 16 LD2			
Boeing 777-200	32 LD3	10 + 2 LD3	10	27		
Boeing 777-300	44 LD3	14 + 2LD3	14	33		
Boeing 777-8F	40 LD3		13	31		
Boeing 777-9	48 LD3	16	14 + 4 LD3			
Boeing 787-8	28 LD3	9	8 + 2 LD3			
Boeing 787-9	36 LD3	11	11			
Boeing 787-10	40 LD3	13	13			
Douglas DC-10	26 LD3	5 + 8 LD3			22	30
McDonnell Douglas MD-11	32 LD3		6 + 14 LD3	26	26	34
Lockheed L-1011	19 LD3	4 + 7 LD3				
Ilyushin Il-86/Il-96-300	16 LD3					
Ilyushin Il-96M/T	32 LD3					

Narrowbodies
Model	Containers	96×125″	88×125″	88x108″
Airbus A319	4 LD3-45			
Airbus A320	7 LD3-45		11	
Airbus A321	10 LD3-45		14	
Boeing 707-320C	no lower ULD		13	13
Boeing 727-100C	no lower ULD (Note: The B727-200 had an option to hold 11 specific 45.5 in–92.4 in × 41.1 in × 43.4 in (1.16 m–2.35 m × 1.04 m × 1.10 m) base-full width × height × depth, 78 ft^{3} (2.2 m^{3}) underfloor containers.)		8	8
Boeing 737-200C	no lower ULD		7	7
Boeing 737-300SF	no lower ULD		9	
Boeing 737-400SF	no lower ULD		10 ½	
Boeing 737-700C	no lower ULD		8	8
Boeing 737-800SF	no lower ULD		11 ½	
Boeing 757-200F	no lower ULD		15	
Comac C919	7 LD3-46			
Douglas DC-8-55F	no lower ULD		13	
Douglas DC-8-62/72F	no lower ULD		14	
Douglas DC-8-61/63/71/73F	no lower ULD		18	
Douglas DC-9-15F	no lower ULD			6
Douglas DC-9-32F	no lower ULD			8
McDonnell Douglas MD-80SF	no lower ULD	8	8	12

LD3 containers being loaded onto a Boeing 777-300ER

Aircraft loads can consist of containers, pallets, or a mix of ULD types, depending on requirements. In some aircraft the two types must be mixed as some compartments take only specific ULDs.

Container capacity of an aircraft is measured in positions. Each half-width container (LD1/LD2/LD3) in the aircraft it was designed for occupies one position. Typically, each row in a cargo compartment consists of two positions. Therefore, a full-width container (LD6/LD8/LD11) will take two positions. An LD6 or an LD11 can occupy the space of two LD3s. An LD8 takes the space of two LD2s.

Aircraft pallet capacity is measured by how many PMC-type LD7s 96 by 125 in (240 by 320 cm) can be stored. These pallets occupy approximately three LD3 positions (two positions of one row and half of the two positions of the following row) or four LD2 positions. PMCs can only be loaded in cargo compartments with large doors designed to accept them (small door compartments are container-only).

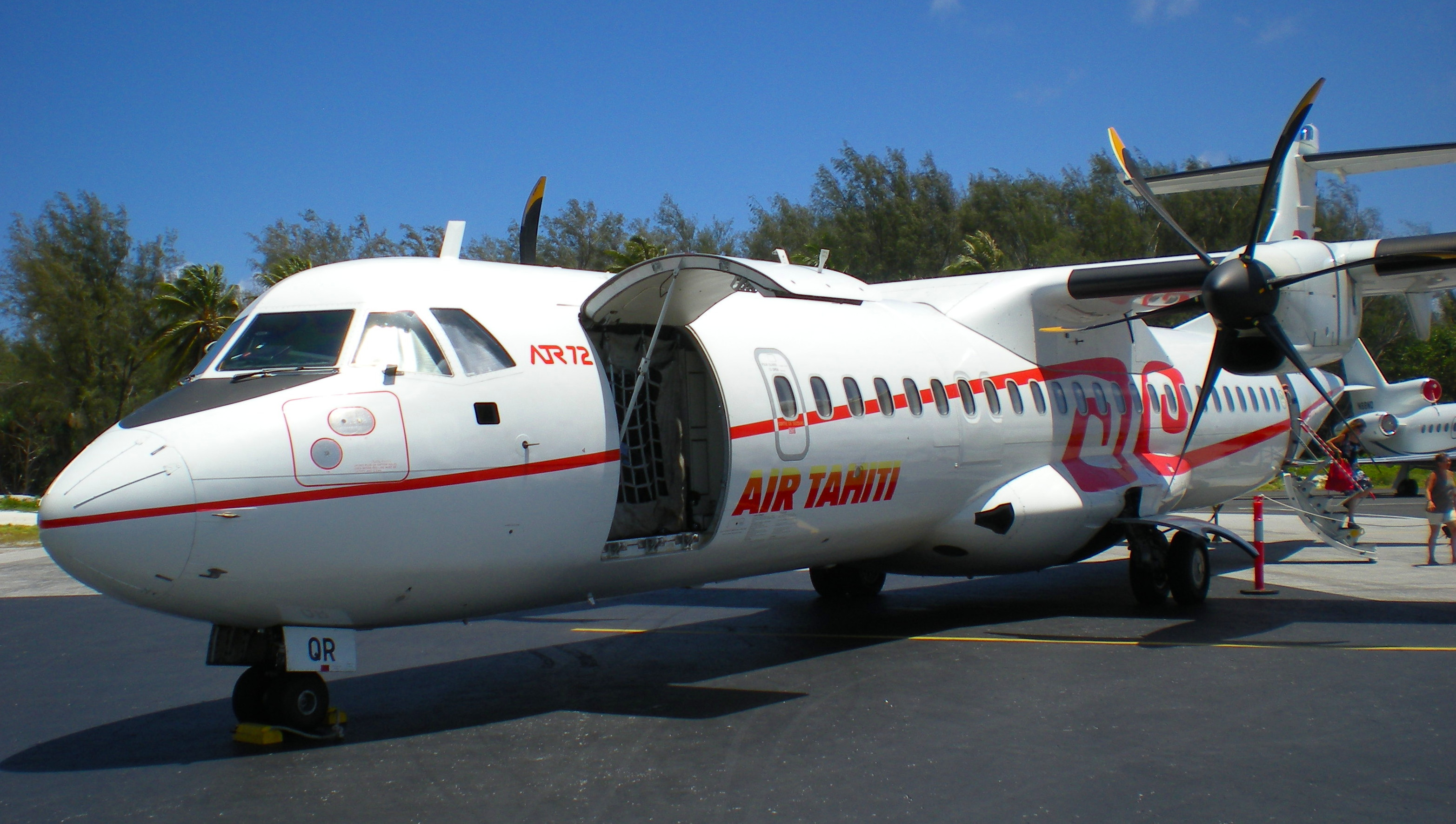
An ATR 72 with its cargo door open

Regional airliners
Model	LD3	46×66”	88×54”	88×62”	88×108”	96×125”
Fokker 100	11					
CRJ200				8		
BAe 146-200	9				6	4
ATR 72	7			9	5	
ATR 42	5			6	3	
Dash 8-300		9				
Xian MA600	5		5			
Short 360	5					
Cessna SkyCourier	3					

== Identification ==
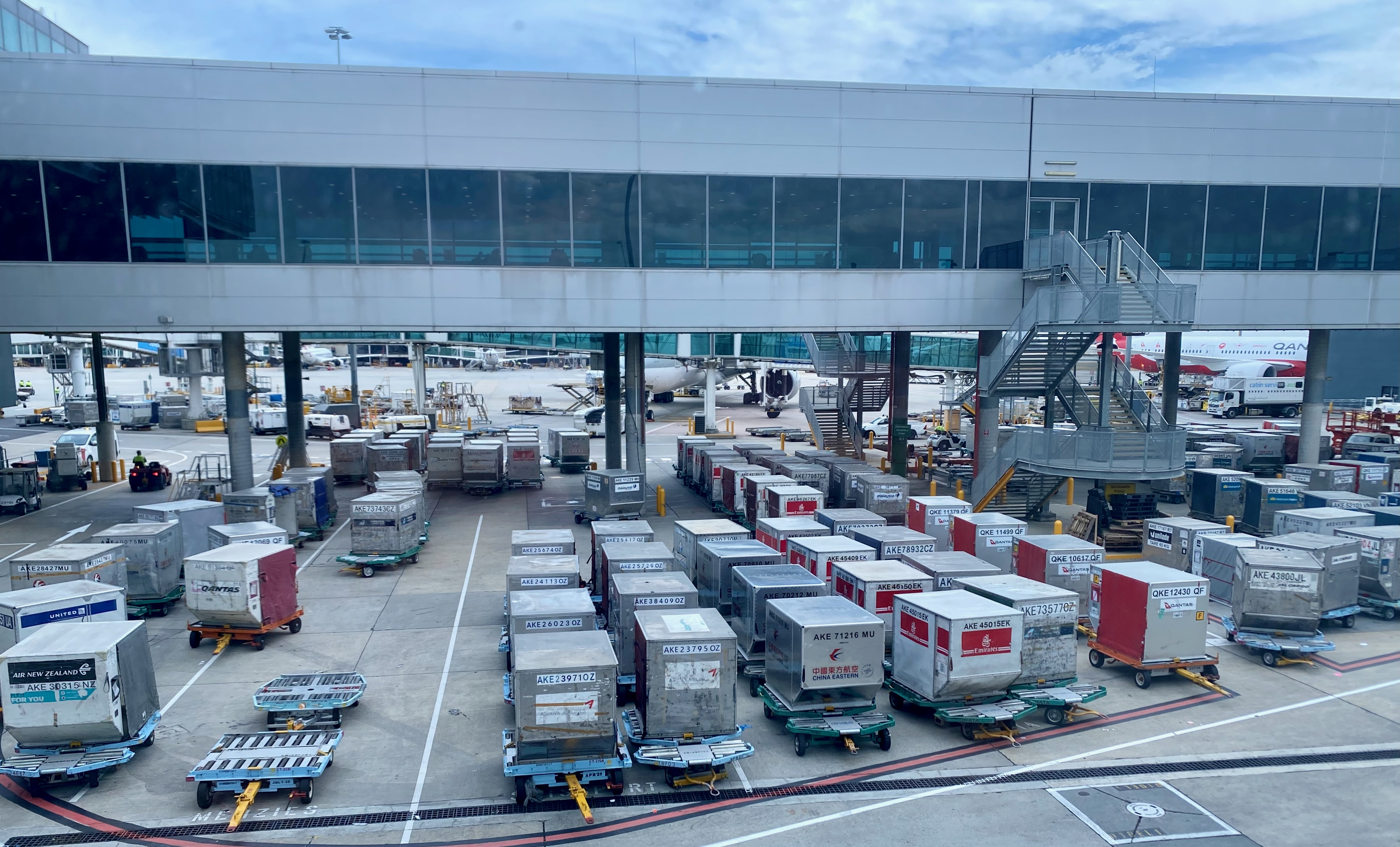
ULDs with their prefixes and serial numbers visible await loading at Melbourne Airport

All ULDs are identified by their ULD number. A three-letter prefix identifies its type and key characteristics, followed by a 4 or 5 digit serial number (4 if prior to October 1, 1993; either 4 or 5 if after October 1, 1993) to uniquely identify it from others of the same type, and ending with a two character (alpha-numerical) suffix identifying the ULD's owner (if an airline, often the same as IATA designator codes). For example, AKN 12345 DL means that the ULD is a forkliftable LD3 with the unique number 12345 and its owner is Delta Air Lines.

IATA ULD prefix
Type (Note: Identifies ULD category (certification, ULD type, thermal units).)	Base size (Note: Identifies standard base dimensions.) (depth × base width)	Contour/restraint (Note: Identifies contour (profile dimensions and shape), forklift holes, and other miscellaneous information. For certified pallets (Pxx), this identifies the NAS 3610 classification to which the pallet is certified.) (overall width × height)
A Certified Aircraft Container; B Certified Winged Aircraft Pallet (Note: Previously used as "Certified Main Deck Aircraft Container"; this designation is obsolete.); C Non-Aircraft Container (Note: This designation is obsolete.); D Non-Certified Aircraft Container; E Non-Certified Main Deck Aircraft Container; F Non-Certified Aircraft Pallet; G Non-Certified Aircraft Pallet Net; H Certified Horse Stalls; J Thermal Non-Structural Igloo; K Certified Cattle Stalls; L Certified Multi-Contour Aircraft Container; M Thermal Non-Certified Aircraft Container; N Certified Aircraft Pallet Net; P Certified Aircraft Pallet; Q Certified Hardened Aircraft Container; R Thermal Certified Aircraft Container; S Certified Multi-Modal Air/Surface Container (Note: Previously used as "Structural Igloo – Solid Door"; this designation is obsolete.); U Non-Structural Container (Igloo) (Note: Previously used as "Structural Igloo – Other Closures" (meaning any door other than a solid door); this designation is obsolete.); V Automobile Transport Equipment; W Certified ULD for Aircraft Engine Transport; X Reserved for airline internal use; Y Reserved for airline internal use; Z Reserved for airline internal use	A 2,235 mm × 3,175 mm (88 in × 125 in); B 2,235 mm × 2,743 mm (88 in × 108 in); E 1,346 mm × 2,235 mm (53 in × 88 in); F 2,438 mm × 2,991 mm (96 in × 117 3/4 in); G 2,438 mm × 6,058 mm (96 in × 238 1/2 in); H 2,438 mm × 9,125 mm (96 in × 359 1/4 in); J 2,438 mm × 12,192 mm (96 in × 480 in); K 1,534 mm × 1,562 mm (60.4 in × 61.5 in); L 1,534 mm × 3,175 mm (60.4 in × 125 in); M 2,438 mm × 3,175 mm (96 in × 125 in); N 1,562 mm × 2,438 mm (61.5 in × 96 in); P 1,194 mm × 1,534 mm (47 in × 60.4 in); Q 1,534 mm × 2,438 mm (60.4 in × 96 in); R 2,438 mm × 4,978 mm (96 in × 196 in); S 1,562 mm × 2,235 mm (61.5 in × 88 in); X Miscellaneous sizes, largest dimension between 2,438 and 3,175 mm (96 and 125 in); Y Miscellaneous sizes, largest dimension 2,438 mm (96 in); Z Miscellaneous sizes, largest dimension >3,175 mm (125 in)	A Main Deck, 2,438 mm × 2,438 mm (96 in × 96 in); B Main Deck, 2,438 mm × 2,438 mm (96 in × 96 in); C Lower Deck, 2,337 mm × 1,626 mm (92 in × 64 in); D Main Deck, 2,438 mm × 2,997 mm (96 in × 118 in); E Lower Deck, 2,007 mm × 1,626 mm (79 in × 64 in); F Lower Deck, 4,064 mm × 1,626 mm (160 in × 64 in); G Lower Deck, 2,007 mm × 1,143 mm (79 in × 45 in); H Lower Deck, 2,438 mm × 1,143 mm (96 in × 45 in); J Main Deck, 2,438 mm × 2,438 mm (96 in × 96 in); K Main/Lower Deck, 3,175 mm × 1,626 mm (125 in × 64 in); L Main Deck, 2,438 mm × 2,946 mm (96 in × 116 in); M Main Deck, 2,235 mm × 2,286 mm (88 in × 90 in); N Lower Deck, 2,007 mm × 1,626 mm (79 in × 64 in); P Lower Deck, 3,175 mm × 1,626 mm (125 in × 64 in); U Lower Deck, 4,724 mm × 1,626 mm (186 in × 64 in); V Main Deck, 2,438 mm × 2,438 mm (96 in × 96 in); X Main Deck, 2,438 mm × 2,997 mm (96 in × 118 in); Y Main Deck, 3,175 mm × 2,083 mm (125 in × 82 in); Z Main Deck, 3,175 mm × 2,083 mm (125 in × 82 in)

=== Common prefixes ===
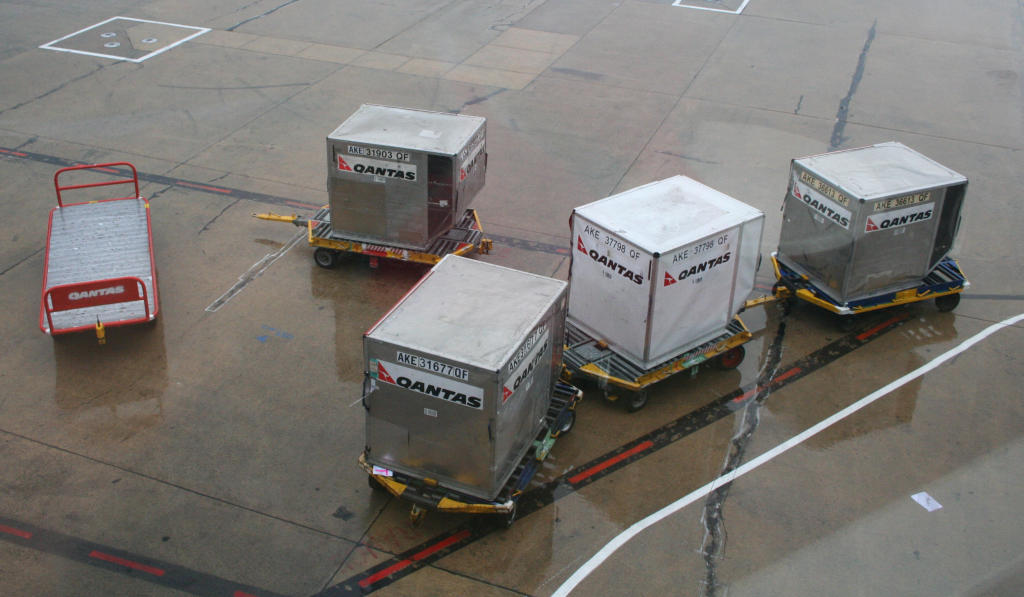
A string of LD3 containers with AKE prefix

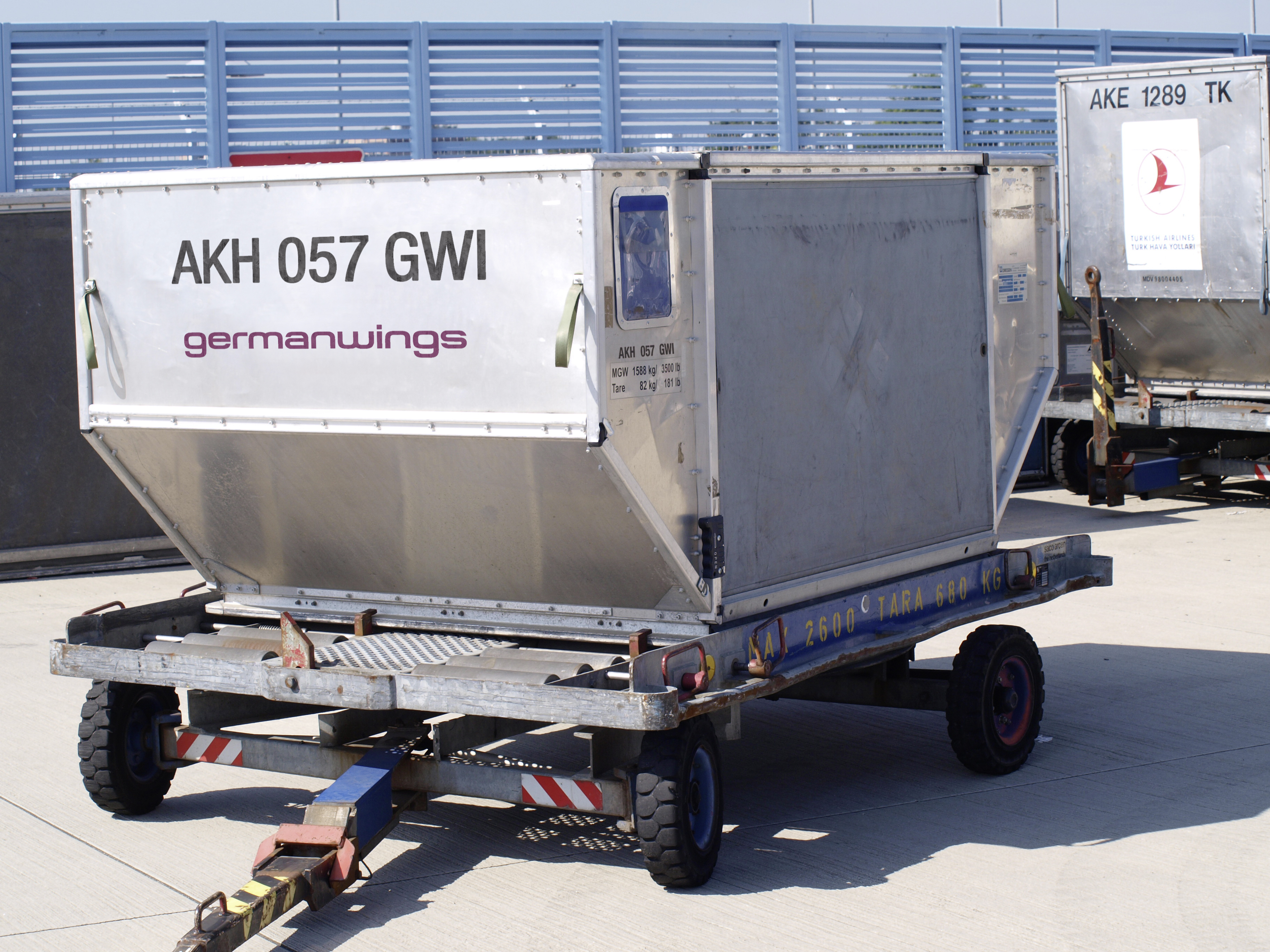
An LD3-45 container with AKH prefix. An AKE prefix ULD is visible to the right.

- AAA: LD7 container (88 in × 125 in or 2,235 mm × 3,175 mm), 81 in (2,057 mm) tall, contoured for maindeck narrow-body
- AAD: LD7 container (88 in × 125 in or 2,235 mm × 3,175 mm), 96 in (2,438 mm) tall, contoured for maindeck wide-body (aka A1)
- AAF: LD26 container
- AAP: LD9
- AAU: LD29 container
- AAY: LD7 container (88 in × 125 in or 2,235 mm × 3,175 mm), 81 in (2,057 mm) tall, contoured for maindeck wide-body and narrow-body (aka A2)
- AAZ: LD7 container (88 in × 125 in or 2,235 mm × 3,175 mm), 64 in (1,626 mm) tall, contoured for maindeck wide-body and narrow-body and any belly (aka L9)
- AGA: M2 container
- AKC: LD1 without forklift holes
- AKE: LD3 without forklift holes/half ALF
- AKH, AKW: LD3-45 mainly for A320/321, 45 in (1,143 mm) tall, same base as AKE, extensions on both sides
- AKN: LD3 with forklift holes
- ALB: LD4 with forklift holes
- ALD: LD11 container (aka L11)
- ALF: LD6 without forklift holes
- ALP: LD11 without forklift holes
- ALP: LD4 without forklift holes
- AMA: M1 container
- AMD: M1H container
- AMJ: LD7 container (96 in × 125 in or 2,438 mm × 3,175 mm), 96 in (2,438 mm) tall, contoured for main deck wide-body (aka M1)
- AMU: LD39 container contour similar to ALF, but deeper and bigger extensions. biggest lower-deck container
- AVY: LD1 with forklift holes
- AWC: LD6 with forklift holes
- AYY: Demi, a half-width contoured container typically used for the main deck
- AYX: AYY with fittings to connect a fire extinguisher so as to carry Dangerous Goods
- DPE: LD2 without forklift holes
- DPN: LD2 with forklift holes
- DQF: LD8 with forklift holes
- FLA: LD11 pallet
- FQA: LD8 pallet (same floor dimensions as DQF)
- HMA: Horse stall
- KMA: Sheep and goat pen
- P1P: LD7, large pallet (88 in × 125 in or 2,235 mm × 3,175 mm), folding wings for overhang
- PAD: LD7, large pallet (88 in × 125 in or 2,235 mm × 3,175 mm), flat
- PGA: M6, large pallet (96 in × 238.5 in or 2,438 mm × 6,058 mm), freighter main deck only
- PLA: LD11 pallet
- PMC: LD7, large pallet (96 in × 125 in or 2,438 mm × 3,175 mm)
- QKE: LD3 same as AKE but made of KEVLAR and designed to be bombproof. No forklift holes.
- RAP: LD9 with refrigeration unit
- RAU: LD29 container with refrigeration unit
- RKN: LD3 with refrigeration unit
- RWB: LD11 with refrigeration unit
- SAA: Full-sized version of the AYY
- SAX: Full-sized version of the AYX
- VRA: M6, large pallet (96 in × 196 in or 2,438 mm × 4,978 mm), twin car rack
- XAW: LD7, large pallet (88 in × 125 in or 2,235 mm × 3,175 mm), fixed wings for overhang
- XKC: LD3 without forklift holes/half ALF

== Main-deck ULDs ==
On the main deck of cargo planes are 79 to 108 inches (2,007 to 2,743 mm) tall ULDs with footprints similar to those of 88 inches (2,235 mm) or 96 inches (2,438 mm) wide pallets and 62 inches (1,575 mm) or 125 inches (3,175 mm) long. A 62-inch (1,575 mm) wide × 88-inch (2,235 mm) tall ULD is half the volume of a 125-inch (3,175 mm) × 88 inch pallet. The 20 foot pallet is 238 inches (6,045 mm) long and 96 inches (2,438 mm) wide. What the actual dimensions of contoured upper deck ULDs are is very hard to know, because most manufacturers only profile width, length and height data.

There are several common types of contoured main deck ULDs, that are contoured (curved to fit in the plane's body) to provide as much cargo volume as possible. Initially ULD contouring was simply a triangle removed from one or two corners of the profile of the ULD, such as the common LD3 and LD6. Main deck ULDs use curves for the contoured shape to truly maximize cargo volume. Upper deck ULDs are just like lower deck ULDs that are either the full width of the plane with two corners of the profile removed (lower deck LD6 lower), or that container is cut in half, down the center line of the plane, (lower deck LD3 and upper deck AAX).

Main deck ULDs and pallets are not only taller than lower deck ULDs, they are frequently two or four times longer. They are usually organized like an LD6, using the width of the plane and missing two profile corners, or two very long LD3s, stored in parallel to use the plane's width and each missing one profile corner, but often twice or four times as long from plane's nose to tail.

Many air cargo companies use main deck ULDs that have both features called dual-profile, so that on smaller planes such as the Boeing 727, they are stored widthwise and have two corners contoured, and on the bigger Boeing 767, they can be rotated 90 degrees and shipped in parallel like LD3s, so that only one corner is contoured when being used like an LD3. This greatly simplifies transportation of cargo containers at slight cost of cargo volume.

== See also ==
- 463L master pallet, used for military aircraft transport and airdrops
- AAR Corp, parent company of Nordisk Aviation, a manufacturer of ULDs
- Containerization
- Intermodal container
- Pallet
- Rio Tinto Alcan, formerly Alusuisse, a manufacturer of ULDs
- Shipping container
- Unit load
