= National Register of Historic Places listings in Catawba County, North Carolina =

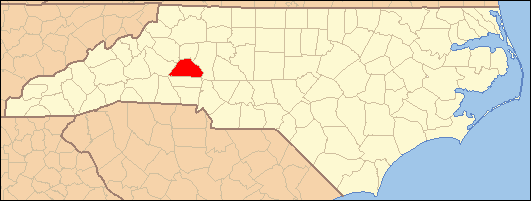

This list includes properties and districts listed on the National Register of Historic Places in Catawba County, North Carolina. Click the "Map of all coordinates" link to the right to view an online map of all properties and districts with latitude and longitude coordinates in the table below.

== Current listings ==
This National Park Service list is complete through NPS recent listings posted October 9, 2026.

	Name on the Register	Image	Date listed	Location	City or town	Description
1	Abraham Anthony Farm	Abraham Anthony Farm	May 10, 1990 (#90000738)	West side of SR 1008, 0.5 miles (0.80 km) south of the junction with SR 2021; 35°34′28″N 81°18′38″W	Blackburn	
2	Balls Creek Campground	Balls Creek Campground	April 27, 1990 (#90000662)	West side of SR 1003, 0.1 miles (0.16 km) south of SR 1943; 35°37′46″N 81°05′50″W	Bandy's Crossroads	
3	Bandy Farms Historic District		April 27, 1990 (#90000663)	East side of SR 1003, 0.5 miles (0.80 km)-0.85 miles (1.37 km) south of SR 1813 junction 35°37′51″N 81°05′35″W	Bandy's Crossroads	
4	Bolick Historic District		July 5, 1990 (#90001032)	First Ave. S. between US 64/70 and 12th St. 35°41′49″N 81°13′15″W	Conover	
5	Bost-Burris House		July 5, 1990 (#90001033)	Junction of SR 1149 and SR 1154; 35°40′00″N 81°14′58″W	Newton	
6	Bunker Hill Covered Bridge	Bunker Hill Covered Bridge	February 26, 1970 (#70000446)	2 miles (3.2 km) east of Claremont on US 70; 35°43′20″N 81°06′36″W	Claremont	
7	Catawba County Courthouse	Catawba County Courthouse	May 10, 1979 (#79001690)	S. Main, W.A, S. College, and W. 1st Sts. 35°39′47″N 81°13′19″W	Newton	
8	Catawba Historic District		April 28, 1986 (#86000893)	Roughly bounded by Second Ave. NE, Third and Second Sts. SE, Second Ave. SW and NC 10, and Second St. SW; 35°42′26″N 81°04′30″W	Catawba	
9	Claremont High School Historic District	Claremont High School Historic District	October 23, 1986 (#86003357)	Roughly bounded by Fifth and Third Aves., Third St., Second Ave. and N. Center St.; also 505-753 N. Center St., 102-126 and 401 2nd Ave., NE., 406-602 3rd Ave., NE., 12-118 5th Ave., NW., and 212-258 5th Ave. 35°44′08″N 81°20′41″W	Hickory	Second set of boundaries represents a boundary increase of December 18, 2009
10	Elliott-Carnegie Library	Elliott-Carnegie Library	March 15, 1985 (#85000584)	415 1st Ave. NW; 35°43′58″N 81°20′42″W	Hickory	
11	First Presbyterian Church	First Presbyterian Church	March 15, 1985 (#85000585)	2nd St. and 3rd Ave. NW; 35°44′07″N 81°20′25″W	Hickory	
12	Foil-Cline House		July 5, 1990 (#90001034)	406 S. Main Ave. 35°39′29″N 81°13′29″W	Newton	
13	Dr. Glenn R. Frye House	Dr. Glenn R. Frye House	August 5, 2009 (#09000600)	539 N. Center St., NE; 35°44′22″N 81°20′17″W	Hickory	
14	Clement Geitner House	Clement Geitner House	March 15, 1985 (#85000703)	436 Main Ave. NW; 35°43′57″N 81°20′45″W	Hickory	
15	Lee & Helen George House	Lee & Helen George House	April 24, 2012 (#12000234)	16 9th Ave., NE; 35°44′41″N 81°20′14″W	Hickory	
16	Grace Reformed Church	Grace Reformed Church	July 5, 1990 (#90001035)	201-211 S. Main Ave. 35°39′40″N 81°13′23″W	Newton	
17	Grace Union Church and Cemetery	Grace Union Church and Cemetery	May 10, 1990 (#90000739)	Junction of SR 1008 and SR 2030; 35°35′56″N 81°19′02″W	Blackburn	
18	Harris Arcade	Harris Arcade	May 8, 2008 (#08000378)	221-229 1st Ave. NW. 35°43′59″N 81°20′26″W	Hickory	
19	Hickory Municipal Building	Hickory Municipal Building	February 18, 2000 (#00000119)	30 Third St., SW; 35°43′57″N 81°20′32″W	Hickory	
20	Hickory Southwest Downtown Historic District	Hickory Southwest Downtown Historic District	December 16, 2005 (#05001409)	Portions of Government Ave.SE, Second Street Place SE, First Ave. SW and Third St. SW; 35°43′51″N 81°20′28″W	Hickory	
21	Highland School	Highland School	June 1, 1990 (#90000824)	1017 10th Ave. NE. 35°44′33″N 81°18′59″W	Hickory	
22	Hollar Hosiery Mills-Knit Sox Knitting Mills	Hollar Hosiery Mills-Knit Sox Knitting Mills	December 26, 2012 (#12001087)	883 Highland Ave., SE; 35°44′07″N 81°19′34″W	Hickory	
23	Houck's Chapel	Houck's Chapel	March 15, 1985 (#85000587)	9th Ave. and 17th St. NW; 35°44′41″N 81°22′07″W	Hickory	
24	George Huffman Farm		June 21, 1990 (#90000861)	SR 1479, southeast of the junction with Tate Blvd. 35°42′45″N 81°15′16″W	Conover	
25	Keever-Cansler Farm		May 10, 1990 (#90000740)	East side of SR 2024, 0.05 miles (0.080 km) north of the junction with SR 2026; 35°34′48″N 81°19′33″W	Blackburn	
26	Kenworth Historic District	Kenworth Historic District	May 9, 1985 (#85001054)	Roughly bounded by 2nd Ave., 5th St. and 3rd Ave. Dr. SE; also roughly along 5th St., SE., 5th Ave., SE., 3rd Ave. Dr., SE., and 2nd Ave., SE. 35°43′40″N 81°19′45″W	Hickory	Second set of boundaries represents a boundary increase of May 18, 2005
27	John A. Lentz House	John A. Lentz House	March 15, 1985 (#85000588)	321 9th St. NW; 35°44′11″N 81°21′09″W	Hickory	
28	Long, McCorkle and Murray Houses		September 5, 1990 (#90001371)	1310-1326 N. Main Ave. 35°40′35″N 81°13′16″W	Newton	
29	Lyerly Full Fashioned Mill	Lyerly Full Fashioned Mill	August 8, 2007 (#06001137)	56 Third St., SE; 35°44′01″N 81°19′59″W	Hickory	
30	Memorial Reformed Church	Memorial Reformed Church	June 21, 1990 (#90000865)	201 E. Main St. 35°34′30″N 81°12′36″W	Maiden	
31	Miller-Cansler House		May 10, 1990 (#90000741)	North side of SR 2007, 0.5 miles (0.80 km) east of the junction with SR 1005; 35°35′47″N 81°15′14″W	Maiden	
32	Alexander Moore Farm		April 27, 1990 (#90000664)	SR 2646 0.5 miles (0.80 km) northwest of SR 1004 junction 35°42′05″N 81°00′02″W	Catawba	
33	John Alfred Moretz House	John Alfred Moretz House	March 15, 1985 (#85000589)	1437 - 6th St. Circle NW; 35°45′23″N 81°21′06″W	Hickory	
34	Munday House		August 22, 1975 (#75001246)	Address Restricted	Denver	
35	Murray's Mill Historic District	Murray's Mill Historic District	December 31, 1979 (#79001689)	Southeast of Catawba; 35°40′27″N 81°05′44″W	Catawba	
36	Neill-Turner-Lester House		May 10, 1990 (#90000742)	North side of SR 1836, 0.25 miles (0.40 km) northeast of the junction with SR 1837; 35°38′59″N 80°57′48″W	Sherrills Ford	
37	Newton Downtown Historic District	Newton Downtown Historic District	May 1, 2012 (#12000253)	Roughly bounded by 2nd & A Sts., & N. Forney, & N. Ashe Aves. 35°39′48″N 81°13′17″W	Newton	
38	North Main Avenue Historic District		May 22, 1986 (#86001147)	Roughly bounded by W. Ninth St., N. Main Ave., W. Fourth and W. Sixth Sts., N. Deal Ave., and W. Eighth St. 35°40′08″N 81°13′26″W	Newton	
39	Oakwood Historic District	Oakwood Historic District	March 25, 1986 (#86000687)	Roughly bounded by Oakwood Cemetery and Fourth Ave. NW, Fourth St. NW, Second Ave. NW, and Sixth St. NW; also portions of 1st Ave. NW, 2nd Ave. NW, 2nd St. NW, 2nd Pl. NW, 3rd Ave. NW, 3rd St. NW, 4th Ave. NW, 4 Ave. Dr. NW, 4th St. NW, 5th St. NW, 6th St. NW, 7th St. NW, 8th St. NW, and N. Center St., and by 8th St. NW, 6th Ave. NW, N. Center St., and 1st. Ave., 35°44′15″N 81°20′43″W	Hickory	Second set of addresses represent a boundary increase approved May 8, 2019
40	Perkins House		October 1, 1974 (#74001336)	North of Catawba off I-40; 35°44′00″N 81°04′23″W	Newton	
41	Piedmont Wagon Company	Piedmont Wagon Company	March 15, 1985 (#85000592)	Main Ave. NW; 35°43′56″N 81°21′17″W	Hickory	
42	Powell-Trollinger Lime Kilns		November 8, 1974 (#74001337)	South of Catawba; 35°39′11″N 81°03′51″W	Catawba	
43	Prestige Chair Corporation-Knitmode Mills		September 8, 2026 (#100013396)	20 East 19th Street; 35°40′52″N 81°13′04″W	Newton	
44	Propst House	Propst House	April 24, 1973 (#73001312)	Shuford Memorial Garden; 35°44′12″N 81°20′49″W	Hickory	
45	David F. Propst House		June 21, 1990 (#90000864)	Junction of SR 1810 and SR 1878; 35°35′51″N 81°11′08″W	Maiden	
46	Franklin D. Reinhardt and Harren-Hood Farms		June 21, 1990 (#90000863)	SR 2013 northwest of the junction with SR 2012; 35°37′05″N 81°14′21″W	Maiden	
47	William Pinckney Reinhardt House		July 19, 1990 (#90001111)	Junction of SR 2012 and SR 2013; 35°36′20″N 81°14′15″W	Maiden	
48	Ridgeview Hosiery Mills		October 15, 2026 (#100013389)	2101 North Main Avenue; 35°41′03″N 81°13′07″W	Newton	
49	Ridgeview Public Library, (Former)	Ridgeview Public Library, (Former)	May 12, 2011 (#11000294)	415 1st St., S.W. 35°43′37″N 81°20′20″W	Hickory	
50	Rock Barn Farm		July 5, 1990 (#90001036)	West side of SR 1709, 0.4 miles (0.64 km) north of the junction with SR 1715; 35°44′32″N 81°09′39″W	Claremont	
51	Rudisill-Wilson House		August 14, 1973 (#73001315)	Southwest of Newton off NC 10; 35°36′58″N 81°15′23″W	Newton	
52	Self-Trott-Bickett House		July 5, 1990 (#90001037)	331 S. College Ave. 35°39′32″N 81°13′22″W	Newton	
53	Sharpe-Gentry Farm		June 21, 1990 (#90000859)	Junction of NC 10 and SR 1137; 35°37′41″N 81°22′22″W	Propst Crossroads	
54	Miles Alexander Sherrill House		April 27, 1990 (#90000665)	West side of SR 1849, 0.1 miles (0.16 km) south of SR 1848 junction 35°37′37″N 81°00′28″W	Sherrills Ford	
55	Shuford House	Shuford House	April 24, 1973 (#73001313)	542 2nd St. NE. 35°44′26″N 81°20′00″W	Hickory	
56	Shuford-Hoover House		May 10, 1990 (#90000743)	East side of SR 1008, 0.05 miles (0.080 km) south of the junction with SR 10; 35°37′24″N 81°19′16″W	Blackburn	
57	St. Paul's Church and Cemetery	St. Paul's Church and Cemetery	December 9, 1971 (#71000573)	Junction of SR 1149 and SR 1164; 35°40′35″N 81°14′38″W	Newton	
58	St. Paul's Reformed Church	St. Paul's Reformed Church	June 21, 1990 (#90000860)	Junction of SR 1151 and SR 1005; 35°38′52″N 81°16′05″W	Startown	
59	Terrell Historic District		July 15, 1986 (#86001685)	NC 150 and SR 1848; 35°33′34″N 80°58′38″W	Terrell	
60	Warlick-Huffman Farm		June 21, 1990 (#90000862)	SR 1116 northwest of the junction with NC 10; 35°37′04″N 81°24′48″W	Propst Crossroads	
61	Weidner Rock House		December 4, 1973 (#73001314)	South of Hickory on SR 1142; 35°38′42″N 81°18′35″W	Hickory	
62	Wesley's Chapel Arbor and Cemetery		May 10, 1990 (#90000744)	West side of SR 2033, 0.4 miles (0.64 km) south of the junction with SR 10; 35°36′55″N 81°20′55″W	Blackburn	
63	Whisnant Hosiery Mills	Whisnant Hosiery Mills	August 27, 2013 (#13000637)	74 8th St., SE. 35°43′59″N 81°19′36″W	Hickory	
64	Wilfong-Wilson Farm		June 21, 1990 (#90000858)	SR 1145, southwest of the junction with SR 1146; 35°38′41″N 81°17′40″W	Startown	
65	Yoder's Mills Historic District		January 11, 1980 (#80002806)	Address Restricted	Hickory	

== Former listing ==
	Name on the Register	Image	Date listed	Date removed	Location	City or town	Description
1	Second Street Place Southwest Historic District		August 11, 1985 (#85001790)	May 5, 1986	Roughly bounded by Main Ave. Pl., 2nd Ave. Pl., and 1st Ave. SW	Hickory	Delisted due to procedural errors; relisted in 2005 as the Hickory Southwest Downtown Historic District

== See also ==
- National Register of Historic Places listings in North Carolina
- List of National Historic Landmarks in North Carolina
