= Yoder's Mills Historic District =

Historic district in North Carolina, United States

- U.S. National Register of Historic Places
- U.S. Historic district
- Nearest city: Hickory, North Carolina
- Area: 60 acres (24 ha)
- Built: 1880
- NRHP reference No.: 80002806
- Added to NRHP: January 11, 1980

Yoder's Mill Historic District encompasses a historic archaeological complex near Hickory in Catawba County, North Carolina. The district covers 60 acres (24 ha) of farm and woodlands, whose principal architectural feature is a late-19th century farmstead, including a house, smokehouse, potato house, chicken house, and barn. It also includes the ruins of a mill complex built in the early 20th century. Its features include the remains of two dams (one wooden and the other masonry), a 150-foot (46 m) millrace, and the stone wall remnants of a grist mill.

The district was listed on the National Register of Historic Places in 1980.

== See also ==
- National Register of Historic Places listings in Catawba County, North Carolina
