= Paul Whitener =

- Born: Paul Austin Wayne Whitener 9 September 1911
- Died: 19 May 1959 (aged 48)

Paul Austin Wayne Whitener (1911-1959) was an American landscape painter and museum director. He founded the Hickory Museum of Art in 1944, and served as Director until his death in 1959.

== Early life and education ==
Whitener was born on September 1, 1911, in Lincoln County, and grew up in Hickory, North Carolina. He attended Duke University on a football scholarship. As a journalism student, his artistic endeavors were limited to the occasional cartoon for the university newspaper. When a number of sports-related injuries brought his college career to an end in 1935, Whitener began to more seriously explore his interest in art. After leaving the university, Whitener took a job with a state transportation agency in the mountain resort of Little Switzerland, North Carolina. Here, he met an art student, Mildred “Mickey” McKinney, who became his wife in August 1936. Further encouraged by Mickey, Whitener enrolled in the Ringling Summer School of Art, an art school based in Sarasota, Florida and held annually in Little Switzerland. He studied with artist and Florida instructor Donald Blake, traveling frequently to the mountains of North Carolina to paint. Whitener was also introduced to New York artist Frank Stanley Herring during this time. Herring’s own artistic pursuits had brought him to the mountains of North Carolina, but he agreed to give instruction to Whitener.

== Hickory Museum of Art ==
In 1940, the Whiteners met New York painter Wilford S. Conrow at an art exhibition in Asheville, North Carolina. For the next fourteen years, Whitener studied with Conrow during the artist’s summer stay in North Carolina. Conrow supported and encouraged Whitener’s long-time interest in the establishment of a museum of art in Hickory, and, during these years of study, plans for the Hickory Museum of Art were drawn. Whitener sought to develop an institution that would promote American art and of that of North Carolina’s Piedmont region. In 1943, Whitener, with the help of his wife and local industrialist A. Alex Shuford, Jr., succeeded in assembling an art association in Hickory. In November, the association held their first exhibition in a vacant office building, and in February 1944, the Hickory Museum of Art was formally dedicated. Whitener was unanimously voted museum director, a position he held for the next fifteen years.

== Work and legacy ==
Whitener’s work consists primarily of landscape paintings, though he also worked in portraiture. He continued to produce highly stylized landscapes and commission portraits during his management of the museum. He was a meticulous painter, using a carefully drawn underpainting, and often beginning works of the same subject numerous times from different angles. In 1955, Whitener was left paralyzed on his right side after surgery could not fully remove a brain tumor. Through declining health, Whitener taught himself to paint again with his left hand. His later work is characterized by brightly colored, impressionistic renderings of landscapes. Whitener died in Hickory in 1959 at the age of 48, leaving his position at the Hickory Museum of Art to his wife, Mickey Whitener Coe. He completed his last painting only three months before his death.
