= Zoey Carroll =

American wakeboarder

- Born: Hickory, North Carolina, U.S.
- Years active: 2020-present
- Known for: Wakeboarder

Zoey Carroll is an American wakeboarder from Hickory, North Carolina. She has competed as part of the 2024 International Waterski & Wakeboard Federation (IWWF) Pan American Wakeboard Championships, despite losing two fingers in a wakeboarding accident less than two years prior.

== Career ==
Carroll began wakeboarding in summer 2020. In June 2022, Carroll suffered a severe injury in a freak accident while wakeboarding; after a training session, one of her hands was caught in the propeller of a motorized wakeboard. Two of her fingers had to be amputated. Although the injury was initially considered potentially career-ending, she was able to resume wakeboarding less than a month after the amputation. 63 days after the amputation, she won the 2022 World Wake Association (WWA) national competition in her age bracket. She finished in second place at the 2022 WWA World Championships. In May 2024, Carroll was signed to a sponsorship with GoPro after winning the Grom Quest Challenge, a "video-submission-based talent search designed to identify the next generation of top action sports athletes".

Carroll was part of the U.S. Wakeboard Team, which won the team gold medal at the 2024 International Waterski & Wakeboard Federation (IWWF) Pan American Wakeboard Championships. She was the winner of the Under 14 Girls Wakeboard division. At the 2025 Masters Water Ski Tournament, she finished third in the Junior Women's Wakeboard division. At the 2026 Masters Skit Tournament, she won the Junior Women's Wakeboard division.

Carroll hopes to compete in the Olympics, if wakeboarding is made an Olympic sport.
