= Weidner Rock House =

Historic house in North Carolina, United States

- U.S. National Register of Historic Places
- Location within North Carolina Location within the United States
- Location: South of Hickory on SR 1142, near Hickory, North Carolina
- Coordinates: 35°38′42″N 81°18′35″W
- Area: 8 acres (3.2 ha)
- Built: 1799, 1844
- NRHP reference No.: 73001314
- Added to NRHP: December 4, 1973

Weidner Rock House is a historic home located near Hickory, Catawba County, North Carolina. It was built in 1751, and is a two-story, three-bay, stone dwelling, with a one-story frame wing. The house was moved to its present location and reconstructed in 1844.

It was listed on the National Register of Historic Places in 1973.
