= Hermene Warlick Eichhorn =

American musician and composer

Hermene Warlick Eichhorn (April 3, 1906 – October 3, 2001) was an American musician and composer. She was born in Hickory, North Carolina.

== Biography ==
Hermene Warlick was the daughter of Jesse W. and Ethel Herman Warlick, and an organist of the fourth generation. After eight years of piano and composition study in Hickory with Alla Pearl Little (one of the first composers to achieve recognition in the state), she entered the Woman’s College of the University of North Carolina (now UNCG), where she studied piano, harmony and composition. She graduated with a Bachelor of Science in music with a specialization in piano in 1926, and in organ in 1927.

In 1926, Hermene married George C. Eichhorn and took a job as an organist at Holy Trinity Church in Greensboro, North Carolina. In 1928 she began writing a weekly column called “Music Notes” in the Greensboro Daily News. She succeeded Wade R. Brown as the choir director at Holy Trinity in 1937.

Eichhorn was active in musical work in the state, as an officer of the Euterpe Club of Greensboro and a member of the executive board of the North Carolina Federation of Music Clubs. She specialized in writing for women’s voices and other choral ensembles, publishing works that received many performances. She also won a number of awards for her compositions.

Eichhorn's works are characterized by original rhythms and harmonies, the use of folk materials, and the free use of early church material. Among the most popular of her compositions were her cantatas Mary Magdalene, published in 1944, and Son of the Highest published in 1946. Both were written in collaboration with poet Rose Myra Phillips, who supplied the lyrics. Eichhorn also corresponded with poets James Stephens and Charles Hanson Towne, who supplied the lyrics for The Daisies and While Mary Slept, respectively.
