= Elliott–Carnegie Library =

Carnegie library in North Carolina, US

- Elliott-Carnegie Library
- U.S. National Register of Historic Places
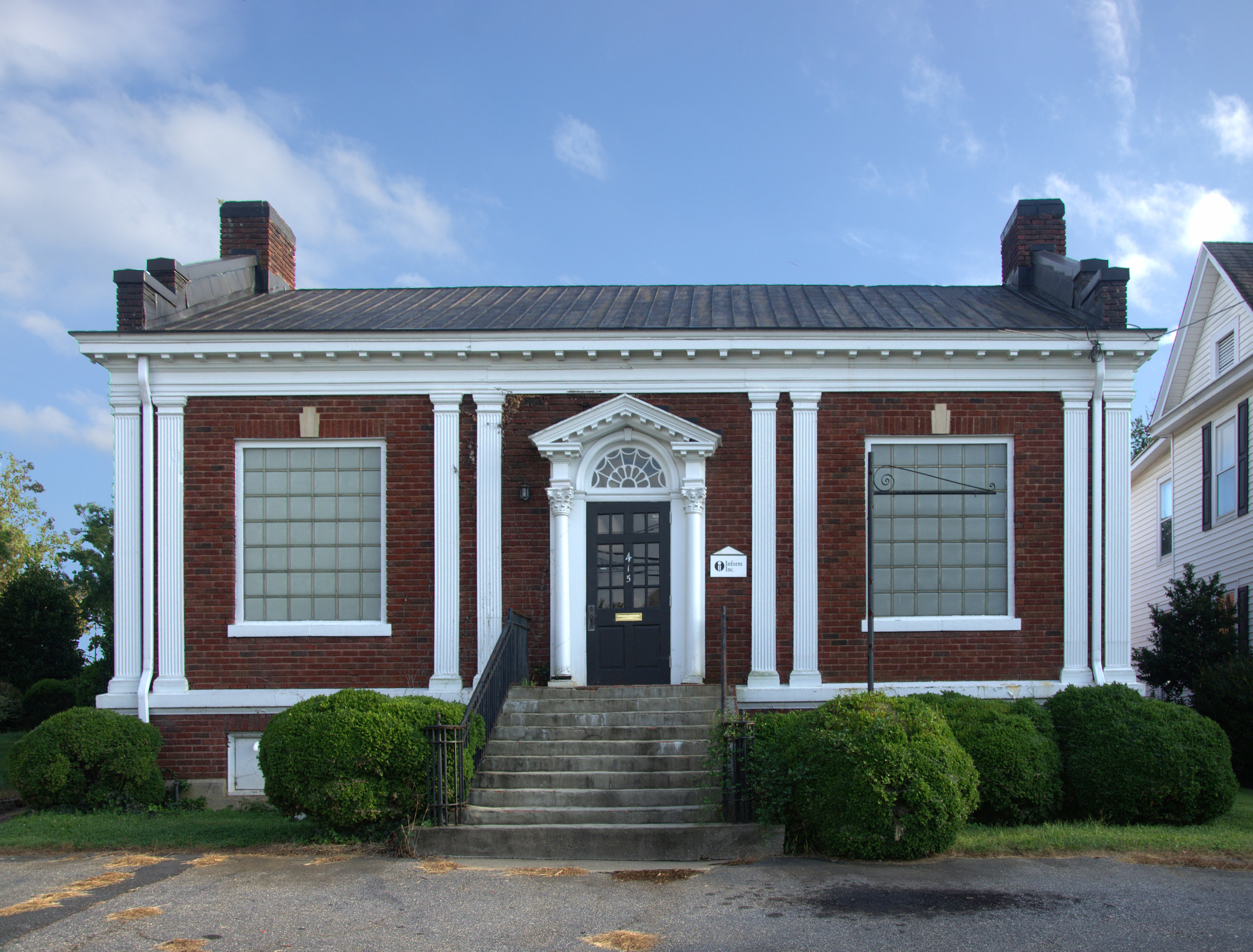
- Elliott-Carnegie Library, September 2012

- Location within North Carolina Location within the United States
- Location: 415 - 1st Ave. NW, Hickory, North Carolina
- Coordinates: 35°43′58″N 81°20′42″W
- Area: less than one acre
- Built: 1922
- Architectural style: Colonial Revival, Georgian Revival
- MPS: Hickory MRA
- NRHP reference No.: 85000584
- Added to NRHP: March 15, 1985

Elliott–Carnegie Library is a historic Carnegie library building located in Hickory, Catawba County, North Carolina. It was built in 1922, and is a small, one-story brick veneer structure in the Georgian Revival / Colonial Revival style. It was the last public library in North Carolina to receive a grant from the Carnegie Foundation that funded 2,507 such facilities worldwide. In the 1950s, it was converted for use as radio station WHKY by the Catawba Valley Broadcasting Company. It later housed an advertising and public relations firm.

It was listed on the National Register of Historic Places in 1985.
