= Shuford House =

Historic house in North Carolina, United States

- U.S. National Register of Historic Places
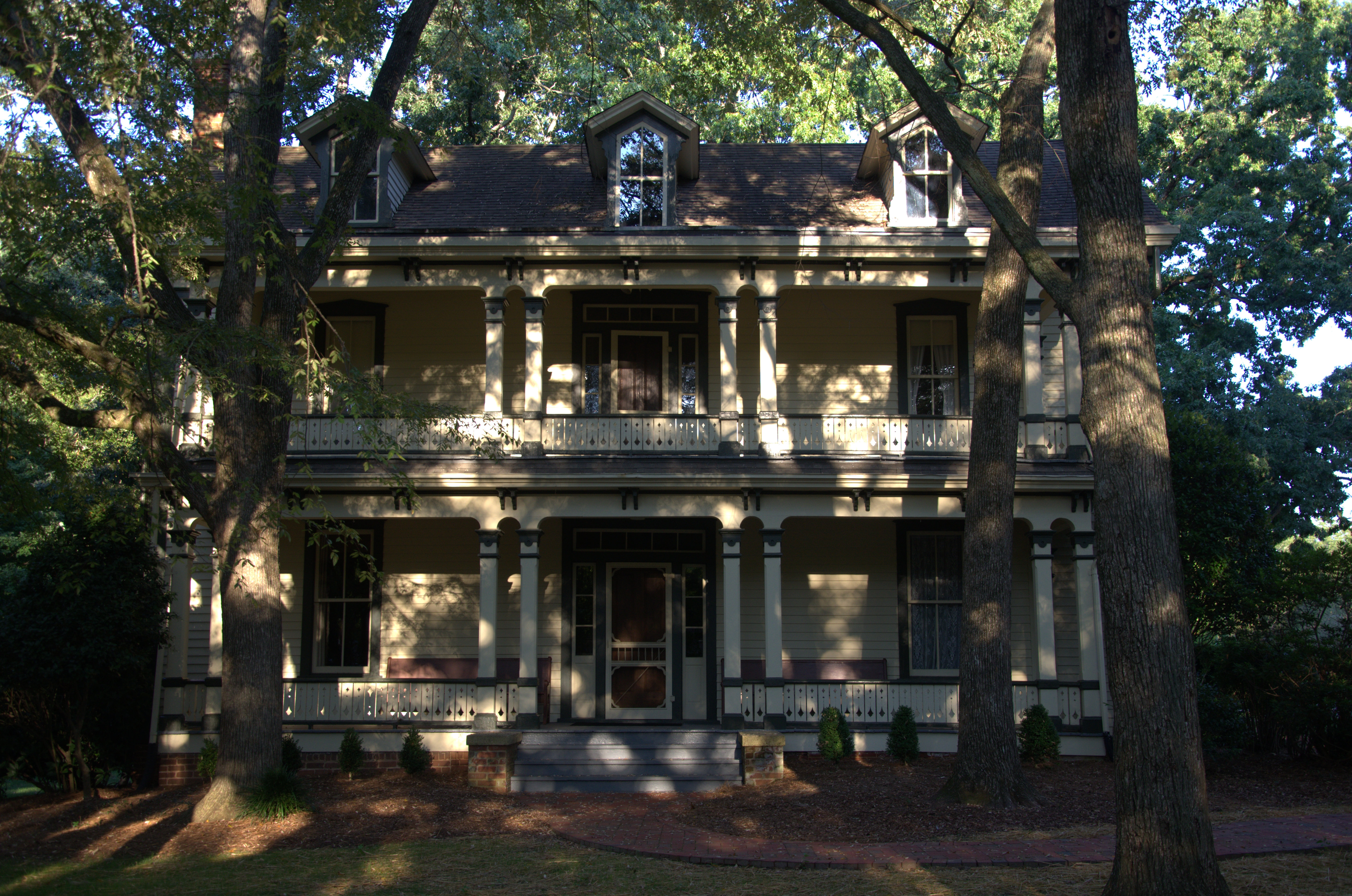
- Shuford House, September 2012

- Location within North Carolina Location within the United States
- Location: 542 2nd St. NE., Hickory, North Carolina
- Coordinates: 35°44′26″N 81°20′0″W
- Area: less than one acre
- Built: 1875
- NRHP reference No.: 73001313
- Added to NRHP: April 24, 1973

Shuford House, also known as Maple Grove, is a historic home located at Hickory, Catawba County, North Carolina. It was built in 1875, and is a two-story, three bay frame dwelling with a central hall plan. It features a two-story porch supported by four pairs of pillars.

It was listed on the National Register of Historic Places in 1973.

Maple Grove has been restored by the Hickory Landmarks Society and operated as a late 19th-century historic house museum.
