= Keever–Cansler Farm =

Historic farm in North Carolina, United States

- Keever-Cansler Farm
- U.S. National Register of Historic Places
- U.S. Historic district
- Location within North Carolina Location within the United States
- Location: East side of SR 2024, 0.05 miles (0.080 km) north of the junction with SR 2026, near Blackburn, North Carolina
- Coordinates: 35°34′48″N 81°19′33″W
- Area: 4.9 acres (2.0 ha)
- Built: 1879
- Architectural style: Vernacular "I" house
- MPS: Catawba County MPS
- NRHP reference No.: 90000740
- Added to NRHP: May 10, 1990

Keever–Cansler Farm, also known as the Daniel Keever Farm, is a historic farm and national historic district located near Blackburn, Catawba County, North Carolina. The district encompasses 5 contributing buildings. The main house was built in 1879, and is a two-story, brick, I-house dwelling. Also on the property are the contributing granary, frame barn (c. 1920), log barn, and smokehouse / wood shed.

It was added to the National Register of Historic Places in 1990.
