= Highland School (Hickory, North Carolina) =

Historic school building in North Carolina, United States

- U.S. National Register of Historic Places
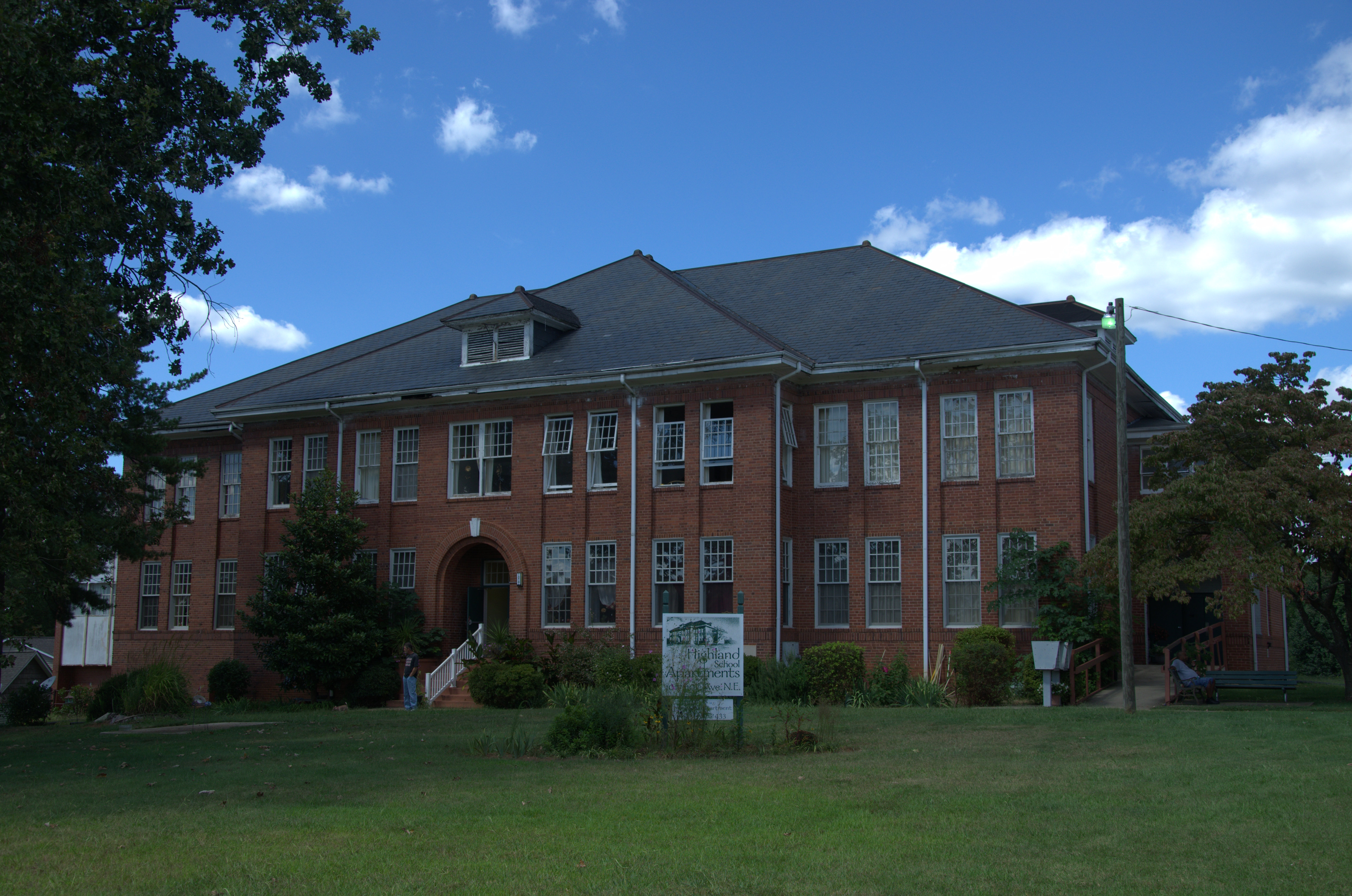
- Highland School, September 2012

- Location within North Carolina Location within the United States
- Location: 1017 10th Ave. NE., Hickory, North Carolina
- Coordinates: 35°44′33″N 81°18′59″W
- Area: 4.2 acres (1.7 ha)
- Built: 1921
- Architect: Rink, L.R.; Setzer, Milt
- Architectural style: Classical Revival
- NRHP reference No.: 90000824
- Added to NRHP: June 1, 1990

Highland School, also known as Highland Graded School, is a historic school building located at Hickory, Catawba County, North Carolina. It was built in 1921, and is a two-story, brick building with hipped slate roof in the Classical Revival style. It has a projecting nine-bay central pavilion. A brick "gymtorium"(which has since been torn down) and lunchroom building was built in 1950 and connected by a covered walkway. It has since been converted into the Highland School Apartments.

It was listed on the National Register of Historic Places in 1990.
