= Claremont High School Historic District =

Historic district in North Carolina, United States

- U.S. National Register of Historic Places
- U.S. Historic district
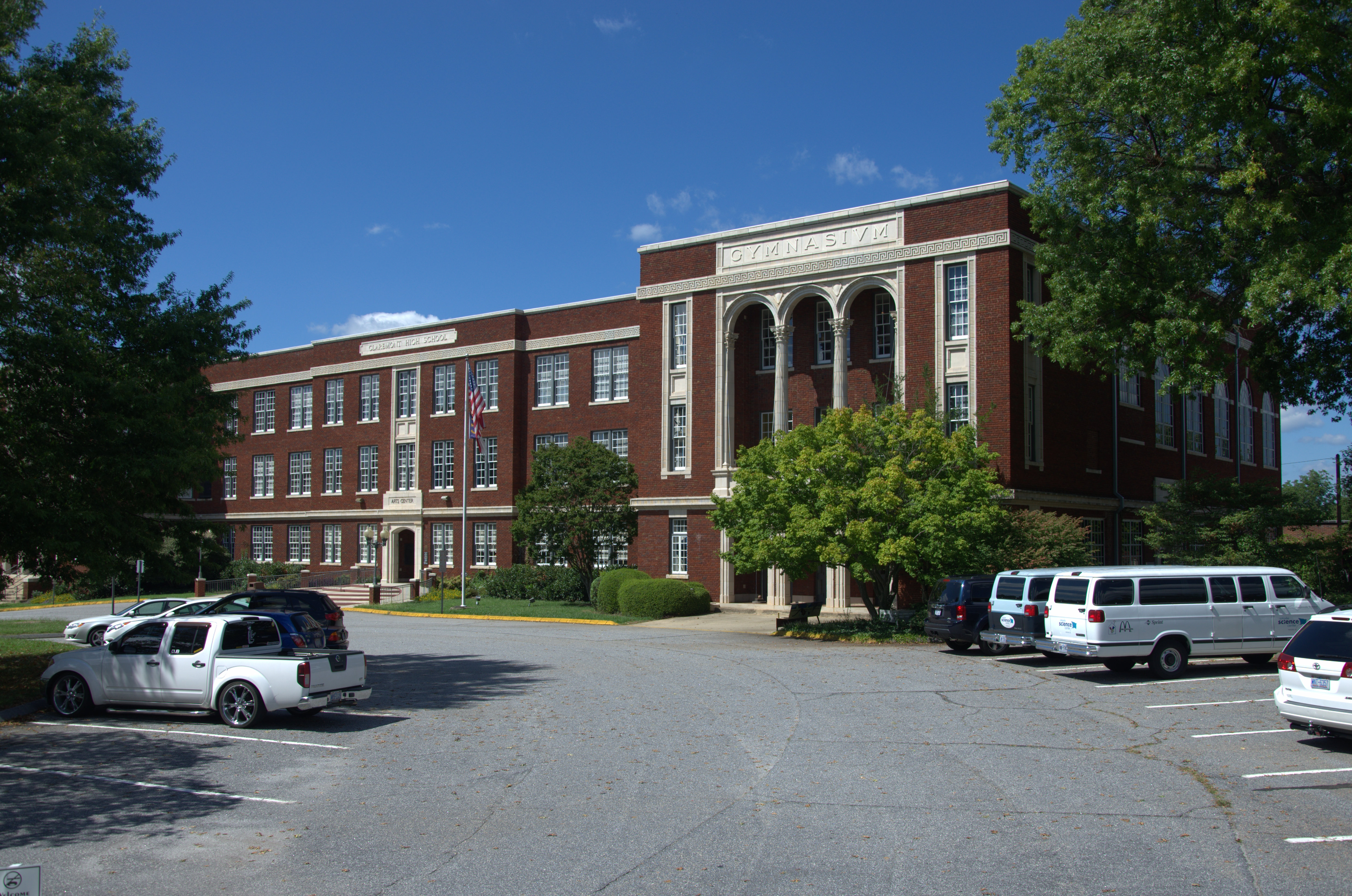
- Claremont High School Historic District, September 2012

- Location within North Carolina Location within the United States
- Location: Roughly bounded by Fifth and Third Aves., Third St., Second Ave. and N. Center St.; also 505-753 N. Center St., 102-126 and 401 2nd Ave., NE., 406-602 3rd Ave., NE., 12-118 5th Ave., NW., and 212-258 5th Ave., Hickory, North Carolina
- Coordinates: 35°44′08″N 81°20′41″W
- Area: 98.2 acres (39.7 ha)
- Architect: Sayre, C. Gadsen
- Architectural style: Colonial Revival, Tudor Revival, Queen Anne, Bungalow/craftsman
- MPS: Hickory MRA
- NRHP reference No.: 86003357, 09001103 (Boundary Increase)
- Added to NRHP: October 23, 1986, December 18, 2009 (Boundary Increase)

Claremont High School Historic District is a national historic district located at Hickory, Catawba County, North Carolina. The district encompasses 172 contributing buildings and 3 contributing structures in a predominantly residential section of Hickory. Most of the dwellings date from the late 19th through mid-20th century and include notable examples of Queen Anne, Colonial Revival, Tudor Revival, and Bungalow / American Craftsman style architecture. The Claremont High School was completed in 1925, and is a three-story, H-shaped, Neoclassical style school. The school was rehabilitated in 1986 as an arts and science center. Other notable buildings include Maple Grove (c. 1875), Shuler-Harper House (1887), Harvey E. McComb House (1889), (former) Corinth Reformed Church Parsonage (1895), Shuford L. Whitener House (1897, c. 1910), Judge W. B. Councill House (1902), George W. Hall House (c. 1906), Carolina Park, Josephine Lyerly House (c. 1912), John L. Riddle House (1918), Marshall R. Wagner House (1938), David M. McComb Jr. House (1939), Arthur H. Burgess House (1940), and R. L. Noblin House (1950).

It was added to the National Register of Historic Places in 1986, with a boundary increase in 2009.

== SALT Block ==
The block in which high school sits is home to the SALT Block. The attractions on site include the Catawba Science Center, Hickory Choral Society, Hickory Museum of Art, United Arts Council, and the Western Piedmont Symphony.
