= Kenworth Historic District =

Historic district in North Carolina, United States

- U.S. National Register of Historic Places
- U.S. Historic district
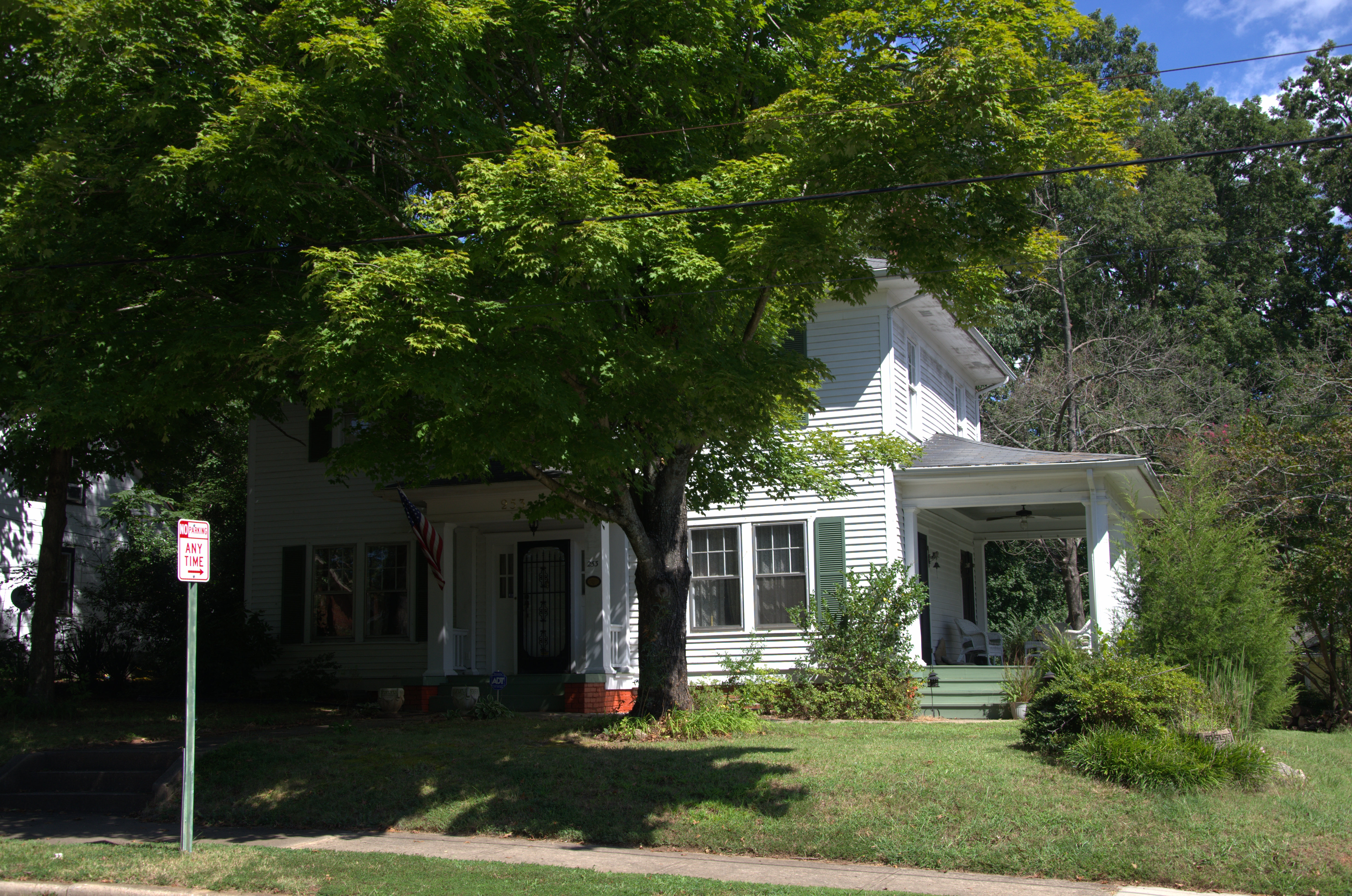
- House in Kenworth Historic District, September 2012

- Location within North Carolina Location within the United States
- Location: Roughly bounded by 2nd Ave., 5th St. and 3rd Ave. Dr. SE; Roughly along Fifth St. SE, Fifth Ave. SE, third Avenue Dr. SE, and Second Ave. SE, Hickory, North Carolina
- Coordinates: 35°43′40″N 81°19′45″W
- Area: 22.1 acres (8.9 ha)
- Built: 1915
- Architect: Asbury, Louis; Blair and Drane
- Architectural style: Bungalow/craftsman, Colonial Revival
- MPS: Hickory MRA
- NRHP reference No.: 85001054, 05000435 (Boundary Increase)
- Added to NRHP: May 9, 1985, May 18, 2005 (Boundary Increase)

Kenworth Historic District is a national historic district located at Hickory, Catawba County, North Carolina. The district encompasses 52 contributing buildings and 2 contributing structures in the planned subdivision of Kenworth in Hickory. Most of the buildings date between the early- and mid-20th century and include notable examples of Colonial Revival and Bungalow / American Craftsman style architecture. Notable buildings include the (former) Christ Lutheran Church (1926), Kenworth Elementary School (1913), Frederick O. Bock House (1923), Nichelson-Abernethy House (1922), Speas-Duval House (1921), Clyde L. Herman House (c. 1922), Kennedy-Setzer House (1921), and Payne-Bothwell-Scheller House (1921).

It was added to the National Register of Historic Places in 1985, with a boundary increase in 2005.
