= John A. Lentz House =

Historic house in North Carolina, United States

- U.S. National Register of Historic Places
- Location within North Carolina Location within the United States
- Location: 321 9th St. NW, Hickory, North Carolina
- Coordinates: 35°44′11″N 81°21′9″W
- Area: less than one acre
- Built: 1890
- Architectural style: Classical Revival
- MPS: Hickory MRA
- NRHP reference No.: 85000588
- Added to NRHP: March 15, 1985

John A. Lentz House is a historic home located at Hickory, Catawba County, North Carolina. It was built in 1890, and is a two-story, three-bay, frame dwelling with Classical Revival style design elements. It features a full-length, two-level front porch with Tuscan Doric order columns. It has a two-story rear ell and one-story wing. It was the home of John A. Lentz (1860-1925), who served as Hickory's mayor in 1911–1912.

It was listed on the National Register of Historic Places in 1985.
