= Wesley's Chapel Arbor and Cemetery =

Historic site in Catawba County, North Carolina

- U.S. National Register of Historic Places
- U.S. Historic district
- Location within North Carolina Location within the United States
- Location: West side of SR 2033, 0.4 miles (0.64 km) south of the junction with SR 10, near Blackburn, North Carolina
- Coordinates: 35°36′55″N 81°20′55″W
- Area: 10.5 acres (4.2 ha)
- Built: c. 1850, c. 1890
- Architectural style: Rustic Shelter
- MPS: Catawba County MPS
- NRHP reference No.: 90000744
- Added to NRHP: May 10, 1990

Wesley's Chapel Arbor and Cemetery is a historic arbor and cemetery and national historic district located near Blackburn, Catawba County, North Carolina. The district encompasses 1 contributing building and 1 contributing site. Wesley's Chapel Arbor was built about 1890, and is a large open Rustic Methodist camp meeting structure, nearly square, with a broad hipped roof. Wesley's Chapel Cemetery was established about 1850.

It was added to the National Register of Historic Places in 1990.
