= First Presbyterian Church (Hickory, North Carolina) =

Historic church in North Carolina, United States

- U.S. National Register of Historic Places
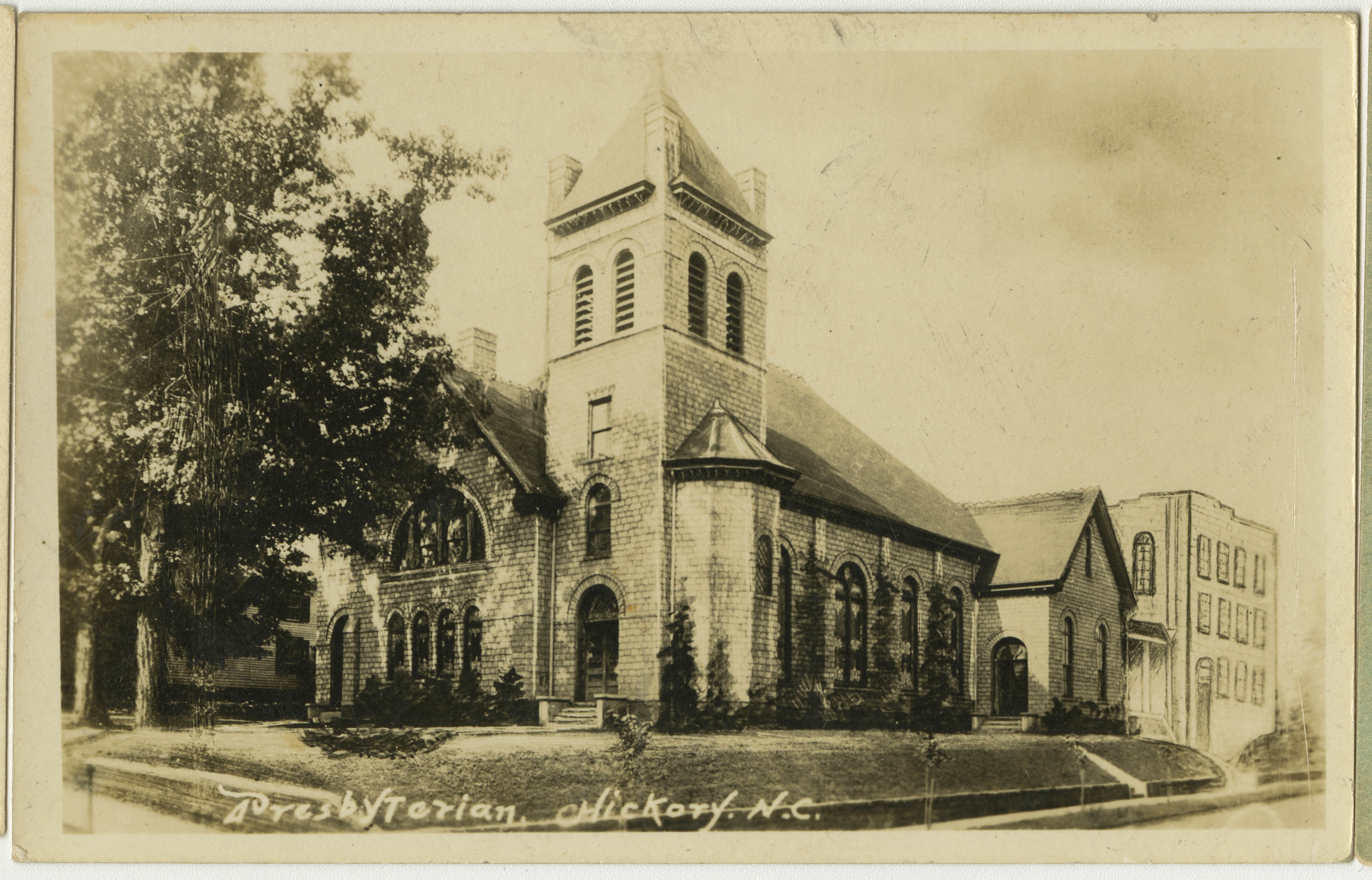

- Location within North Carolina Location within the United States
- Location: 2nd St. and 3rd Ave. NW, Hickory, North Carolina
- Coordinates: 35°44′7″N 81°20′25″W
- Area: 2 acres (0.81 ha)
- Built: 1905-1906
- Architect: Bowman Brothers; Et al.
- Architectural style: Romanesque, American Four Square
- MPS: Hickory MRA
- NRHP reference No.: 85000585
- Added to NRHP: March 15, 1985

First Presbyterian Church is a historic Presbyterian church located at 2nd Street and 3rd Avenue NW in Hickory, Catawba County, North Carolina. The church began in 1873 as a small mission church in the village of Hickory Station. Construction of the current building took place between 1905 and 1906, and it features a Romanesque Revival architectural style with a granite exterior. The front facade features square towers of unequal height. Attached to the church in 1928, is a three-story granite block Education Building with a flat roof and crenelated cornice. Also on the property is the former manse; a two-story, American Foursquare dwelling with a low hipped roof, overhanging eaves, and hipped dormer.

It was added to the National Register of Historic Places in 1985.
