= Ridgeview Public Library =

Historic library in North Carolina, US

- Ridgeview Public Library, (Former)
- U.S. National Register of Historic Places
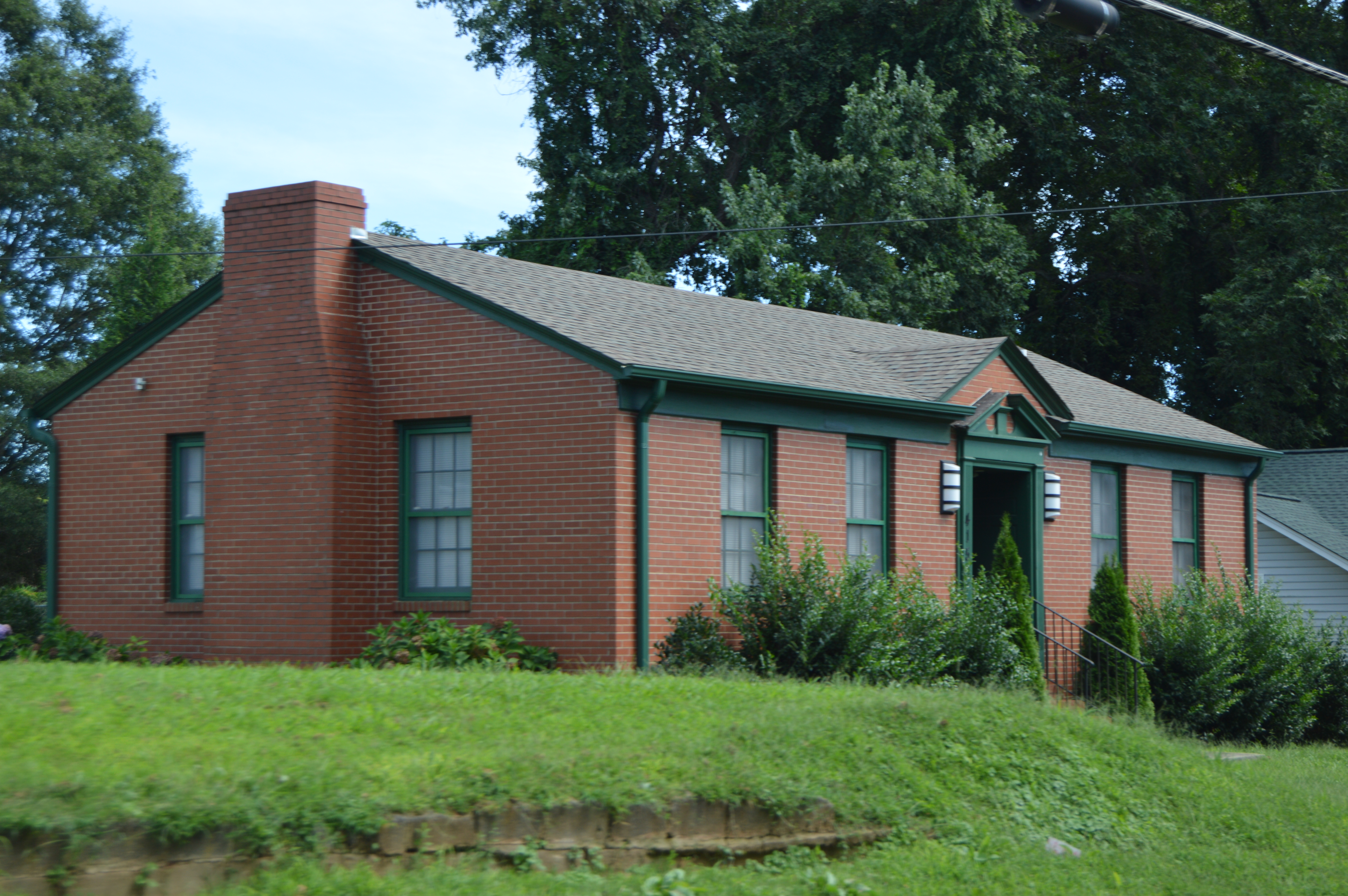
- Facade

- Location within North Carolina Location within the United States
- Location: 415 1st St., S.W., Hickory, North Carolina
- Coordinates: 35°43′37″N 81°20′20″W
- Area: less than one acre
- Built: 1951
- Architectural style: Colonial Revival
- NRHP reference No.: 11000294
- Added to NRHP: May 12, 2011

Ridgeview Public Library is a historic former library located at Hickory, Catawba County, North Carolina. It was built in 1951, and is a one-story, brick veneer building with Colonial Revival-style design elements. It was moved to its present location in 1998, when it was replaced with the new Ridgeview Branch Library. The library was constructed to serve the African-American neighborhood of Ridgeview.

It was listed on the National Register of Historic Places in 2011.
