= Houck's Chapel =

Historic church in North Carolina, United States

- U.S. National Register of Historic Places
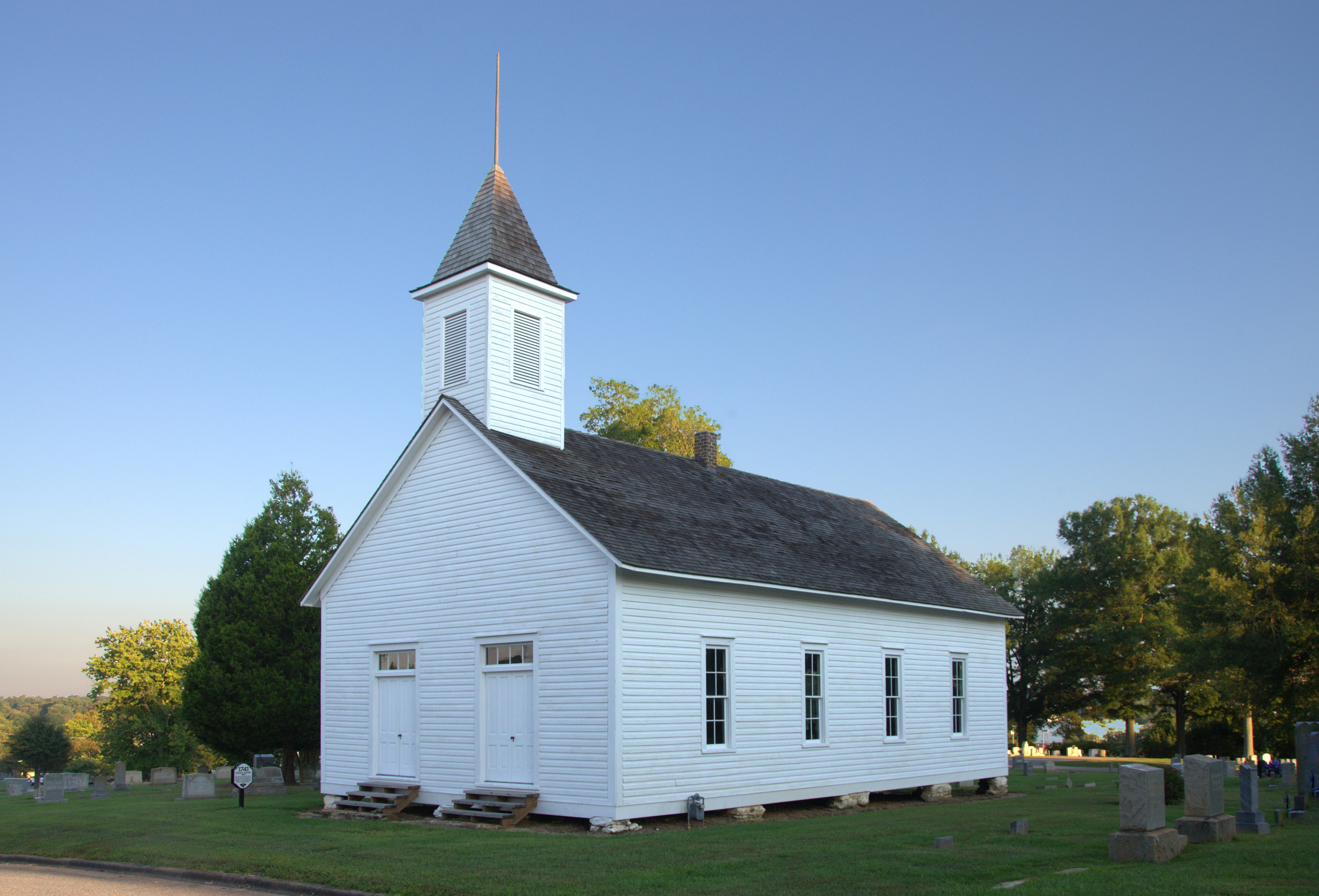
- Houck's Chapel, September 2012

- Location within North Carolina Location within the United States
- Location: 9th Ave. and 17th St. NW, Hickory, North Carolina
- Coordinates: 35°44′41″N 81°22′7″W
- Area: 1.9 acres (0.77 ha)
- Built: 1888
- MPS: Hickory MRA
- NRHP reference No.: 85000587
- Added to NRHP: March 15, 1985

Houck's Chapel is a historic Methodist church located at Hickory, Catawba County, North Carolina. It was built in 1888, and is a small, rectangular frame church building. It is two bays wide and four deep and rests on a stone pier foundation. Atop the roof is a pyramidal roofed belfry. Also on the property is the contributing church cemetery.

It was listed on the National Register of Historic Places in 1985.

Houck's Chapel has been restored by the Hickory Landmarks Society and is open for tours by appointment.
