= John Alfred Moretz House =

Historic house in North Carolina, United States

- U.S. National Register of Historic Places
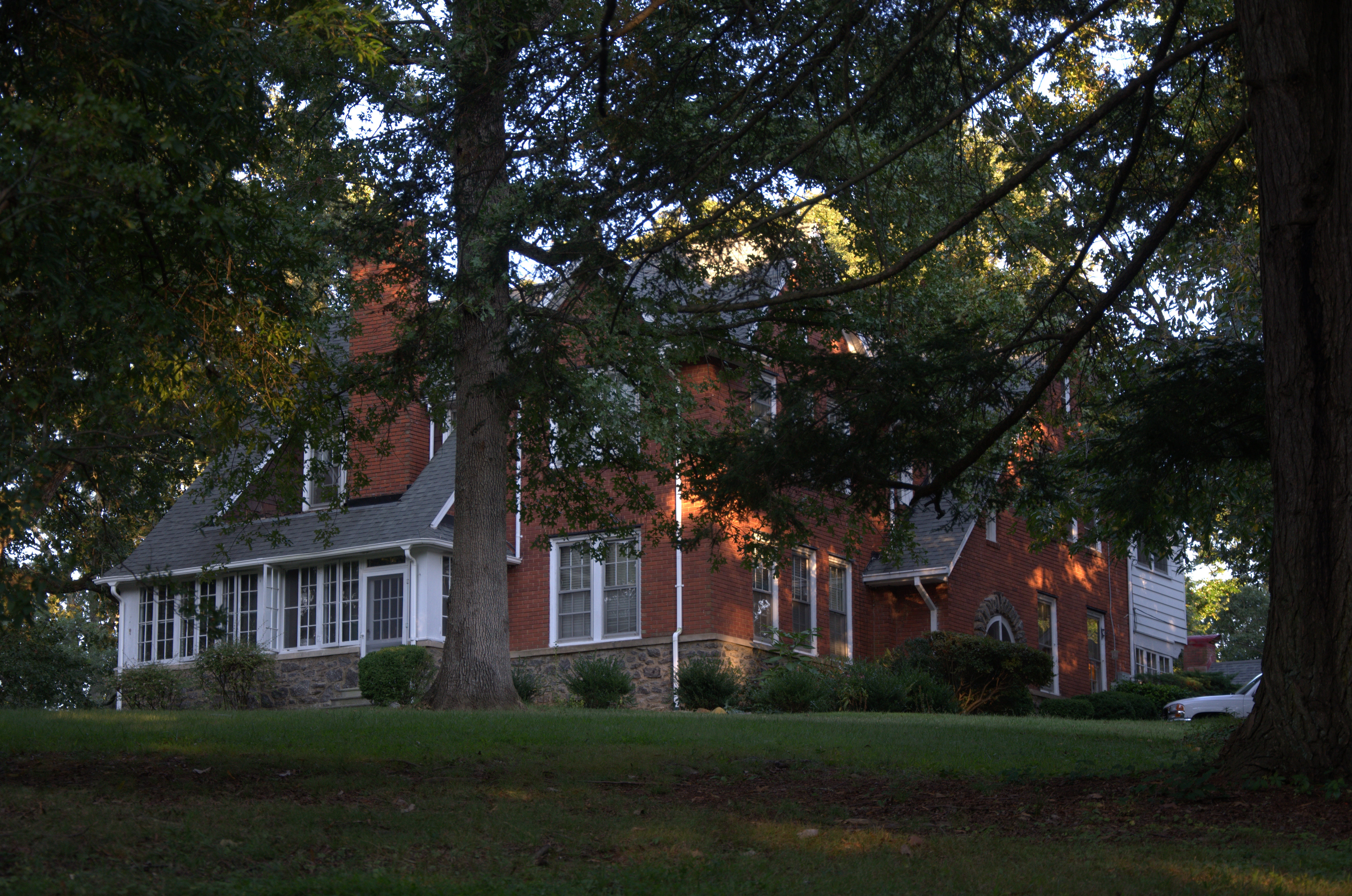
- Moretz House, September 2012

- Location within North Carolina Location within the United States
- Location: 1437 - 6th St. Circle NW, Hickory, North Carolina
- Coordinates: 35°45′23″N 81°21′6″W
- Area: 2.1 acres (0.85 ha)
- Built: 1917
- Architectural style: Cotswold Cottage
- MPS: Hickory MRA
- NRHP reference No.: 85000589
- Added to NRHP: March 15, 1985

John Alfred Moretz House is a historic home located at Hickory, Catawba County, North Carolina. It was built in 1917, and is a two-story, brick dwelling patterned after a Cotswold (or English) Cottage. It features rough stone entrance arches.

It was listed on the National Register of Historic Places in 1985.
