= Dr. Glenn R. Frye House =

Historic house in North Carolina, United States

- U.S. National Register of Historic Places
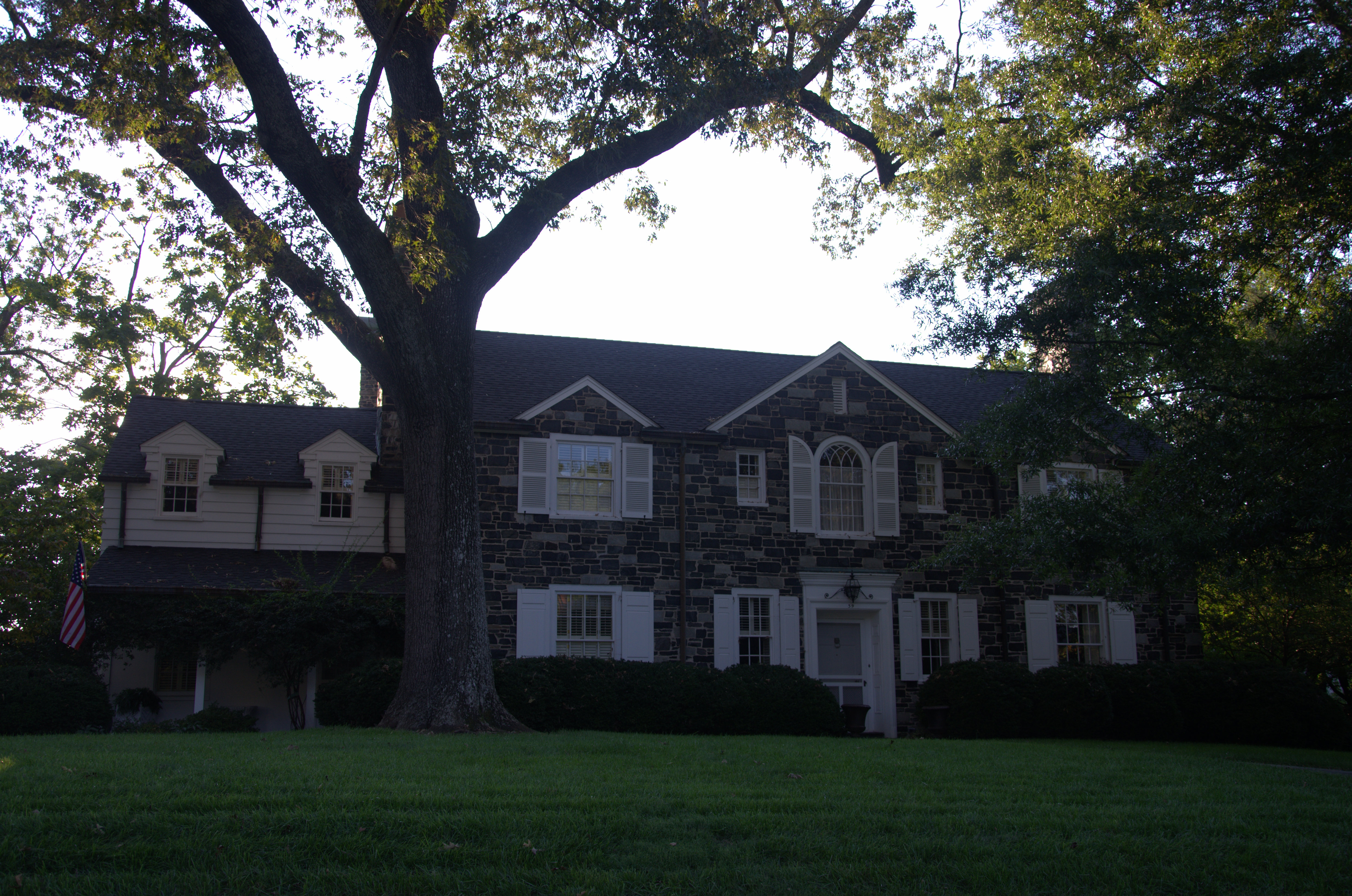
- Dr. Glenn Frye House, September 2012

- Location within North Carolina Location within the United States
- Location: 539 N. Center St., NE, Hickory, North Carolina
- Coordinates: 35°44′24″N 81°20′18″W
- Area: less than one acre
- Built: 1937
- Built by: Herman, Q.E.
- Architect: Clemmer, Robert L.
- Architectural style: Colonial Revival
- NRHP reference No.: 09000600
- Added to NRHP: August 5, 2009

Dr. Glenn R. Frye House is a historic home located at Hickory, Catawba County, North Carolina. It was built in 1937, and is a two-story, Colonial Revival style stone dwelling. It has a 1 1/2-story frame wing. Also on the property are the contributing garage (1937); wrought-iron balustrade, fence, and gates (1937); and stone wall (1937).

It was listed on the National Register of Historic Places in 2009.
