= Propst House =

Historic house in North Carolina, United States

- U.S. National Register of Historic Places
- U.S. Historic district – Contributing property
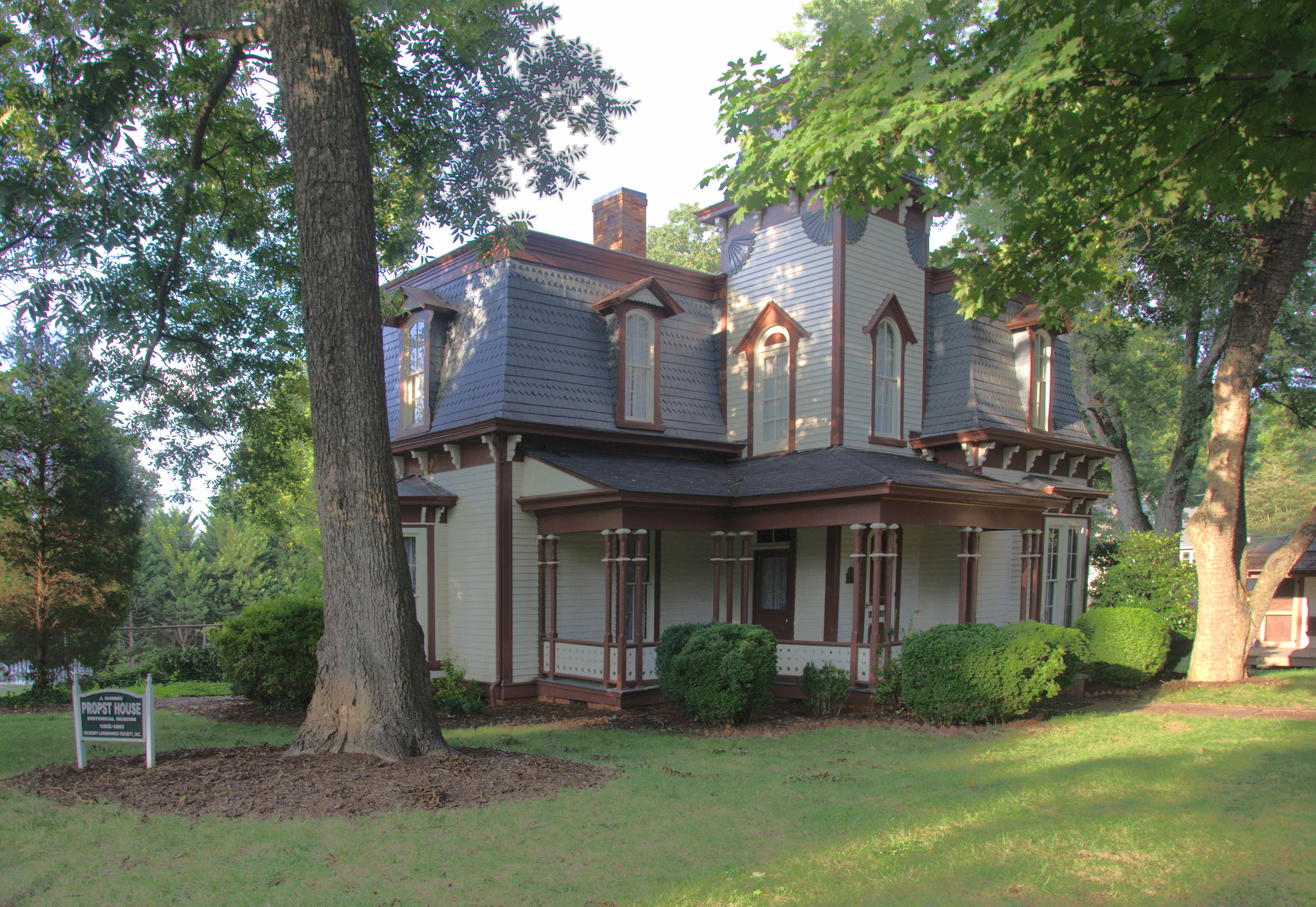
- Propst House, September 2012

- Location within North Carolina Location within the United States
- Location: Shuford Memorial Garden, Hickory, North Carolina
- Coordinates: 35°44′16″N 81°22′45″W
- Area: less than one acre
- Built: 1881
- Built by: Propst, J. Summie
- Architectural style: Second Empire
- NRHP reference No.: 73001312
- Added to NRHP: April 24, 1973

Propst House is a historic home located in Hickory, Catawba County, North Carolina. Built in 1881, and is a 1 1/2–story, Second Empire style frame dwelling. It has a mansard roof, a square mansard tower, and interesting wooden ornament.

It was listed on the National Register of Historic Places in 1973, and as such is located in the Oakwood Historic District. The house has been restored by the Hickory Landmarks Society and is operated as a late 19th-century historic house museum.
