= Whisnant Hosiery Mills =

Historic industrial building in North Carolina, US

- U.S. National Register of Historic Places
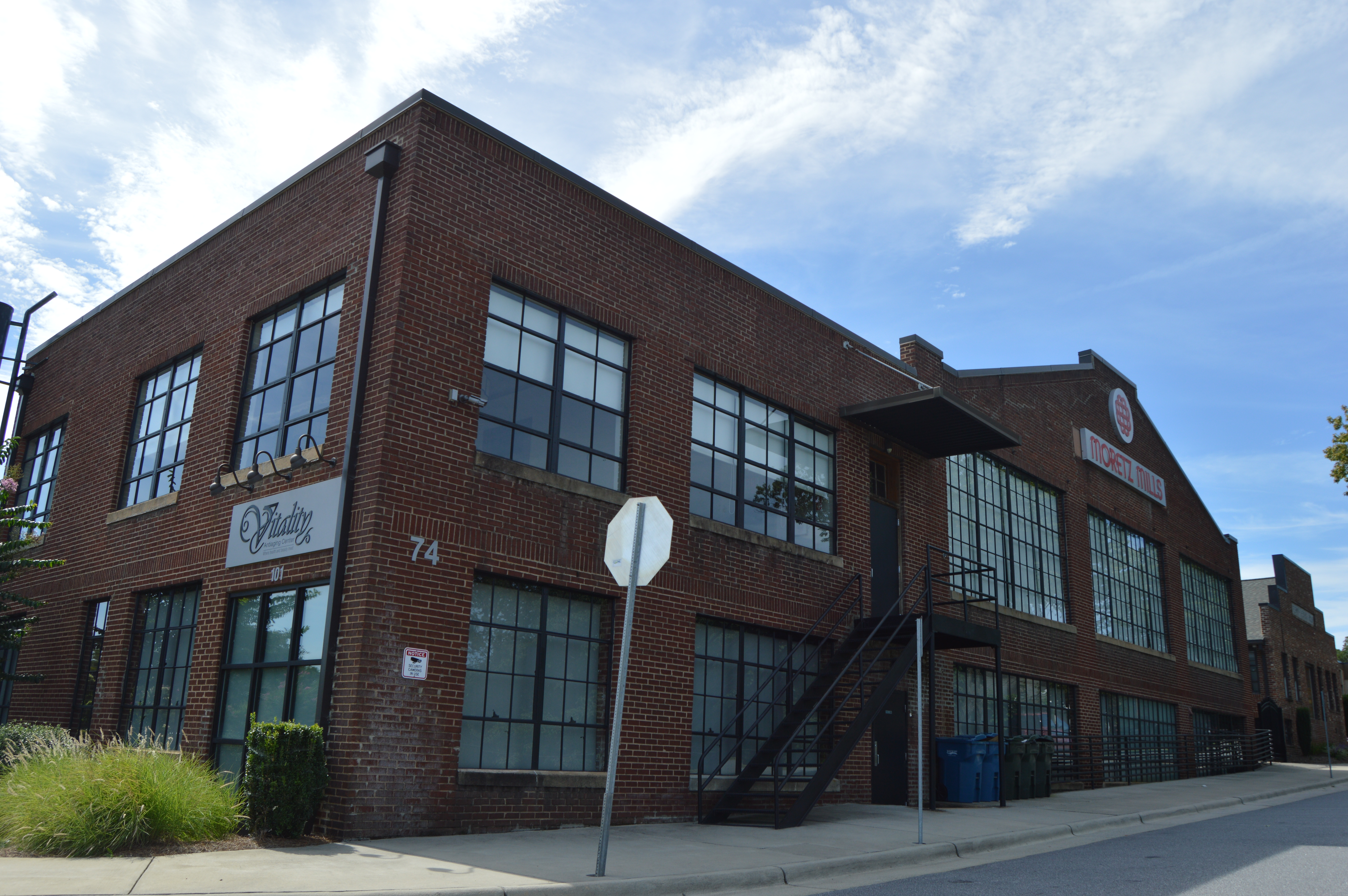
- Eastern side

- Location within North Carolina Location within the United States
- Location: 74 Eighth Street SE, Hickory, North Carolina
- Coordinates: 35°43′59″N 81°19′37″W
- Area: 2.35 acres (0.95 ha)
- Built: 1929, 1937, the 1940s, the 1950s, 1966
- Architect: D. Carroll Abee
- NRHP reference No.: 13000637
- Added to NRHP: August 27, 2013

Whisnant Hosiery Mills, also known as Moretz Mills, is a historic knitting mill located at Hickory, Catawba County, North Carolina. It is a one- to two-story, trapezoidal shaped brick building consisting of contiguous sections built in 1929, 1937, the 1940s, the 1950s, and 1966. The mill closed in 2011. It was listed on the National Register of Historic Places in 2013. The property underwent significant rehabilitation using historic tax credits and re-opened as a mixed use space in April 2015. The property was designated a local historic landmark by the City of Hickory in August 2015.
