= Lee & Helen George House =

Historic house in North Carolina, United States

- U.S. National Register of Historic Places
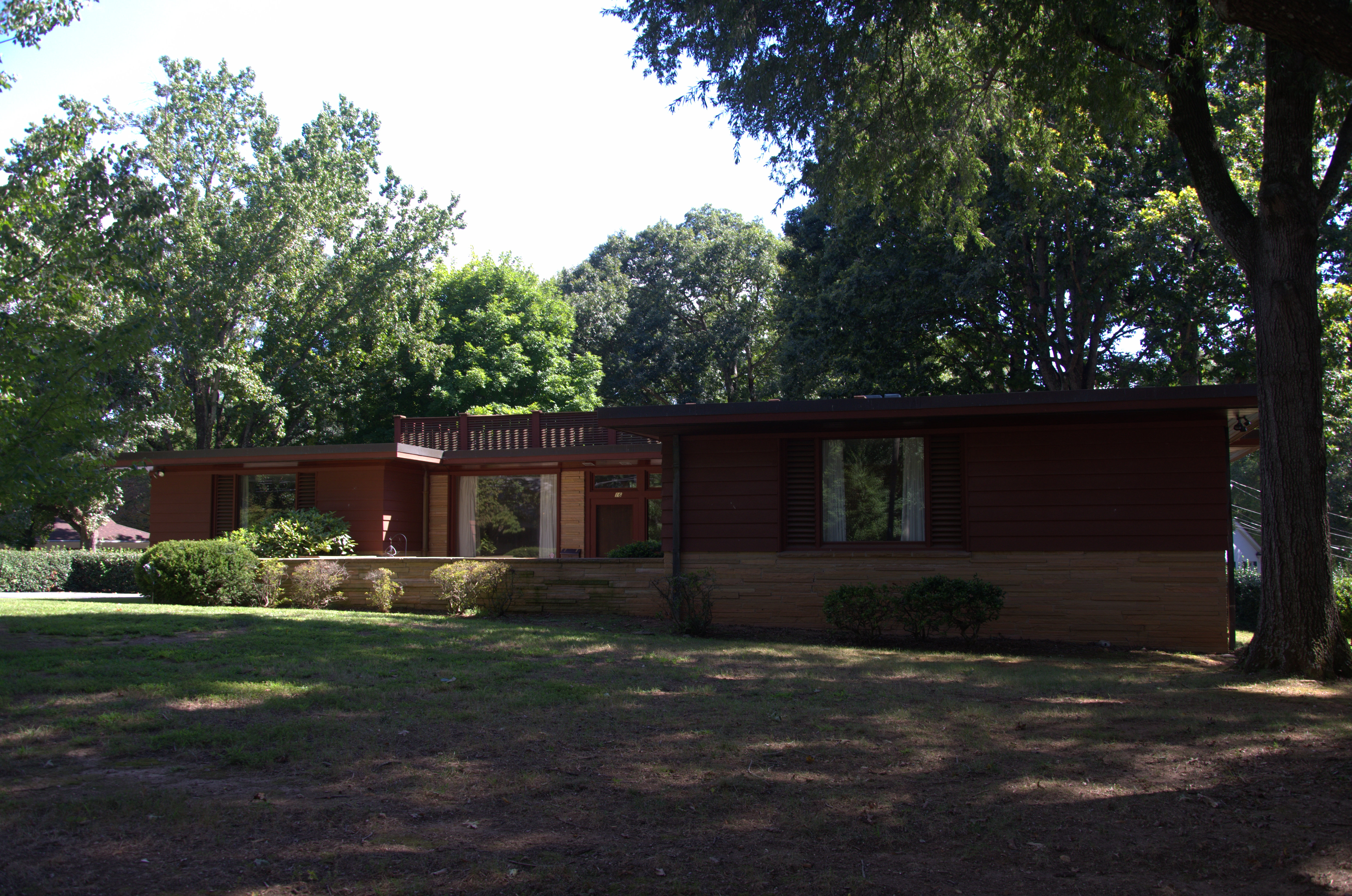
- Lee and Helen George House, September 2012

- Location within North Carolina Location within the United States
- Location: 16 Ninth Avenue, NE, Hickory, North Carolina
- Coordinates: 35°44′41″N 81°20′14″W
- Area: 0.51 acres (0.21 ha)
- Built: 1951
- Architect: Tashiro, Aiji; Abee, D. Carroll
- Architectural style: Modernist
- NRHP reference No.: 12000234
- Added to NRHP: April 24, 2012

Lee & Helen George House is a historic home located at Hickory, Catawba County, North Carolina. It was built in 1951, and is a one-story, Redwood weatherboard sheathed Modernist / Usonian-style dwelling. The house consists of a center main block with projecting rooms on each end of the façade, a rear wing, and an attached carport.

It was listed on the National Register of Historic Places in 2012.
