= Wilfong–Wilson Farm =

Historic farm in North Carolina, United States

- Wilfong-Wilson Farm
- U.S. National Register of Historic Places
- U.S. Historic district
- Location within North Carolina Location within the United States
- Location: SR 1145, southwest of the junction with SR 1146, near Startown, North Carolina
- Coordinates: 35°38′41″N 81°17′40″W
- Area: 53 acres (21 ha)
- Built: c. 1830
- Architectural style: Federal
- MPS: Catawba County MPS
- NRHP reference No.: 90000858
- Added to NRHP: June 21, 1990

Wilfong–Wilson Farm, also known as the Major Wilson House, is a historic farm and national historic district located near Startown, Catawba County, North Carolina. The district encompasses 2 contributing buildings, 1 contributing site and 2 contributing structures. The house was built about 1830, and is a two-story, Federal style frame farmhouse. Also on the property are the contributing log smokehouse, corn crib, and potato house.

It was added to the National Register of Historic Places in 1990.
