= Clement Geitner House =

Historic house in North Carolina, United States

- U.S. National Register of Historic Places
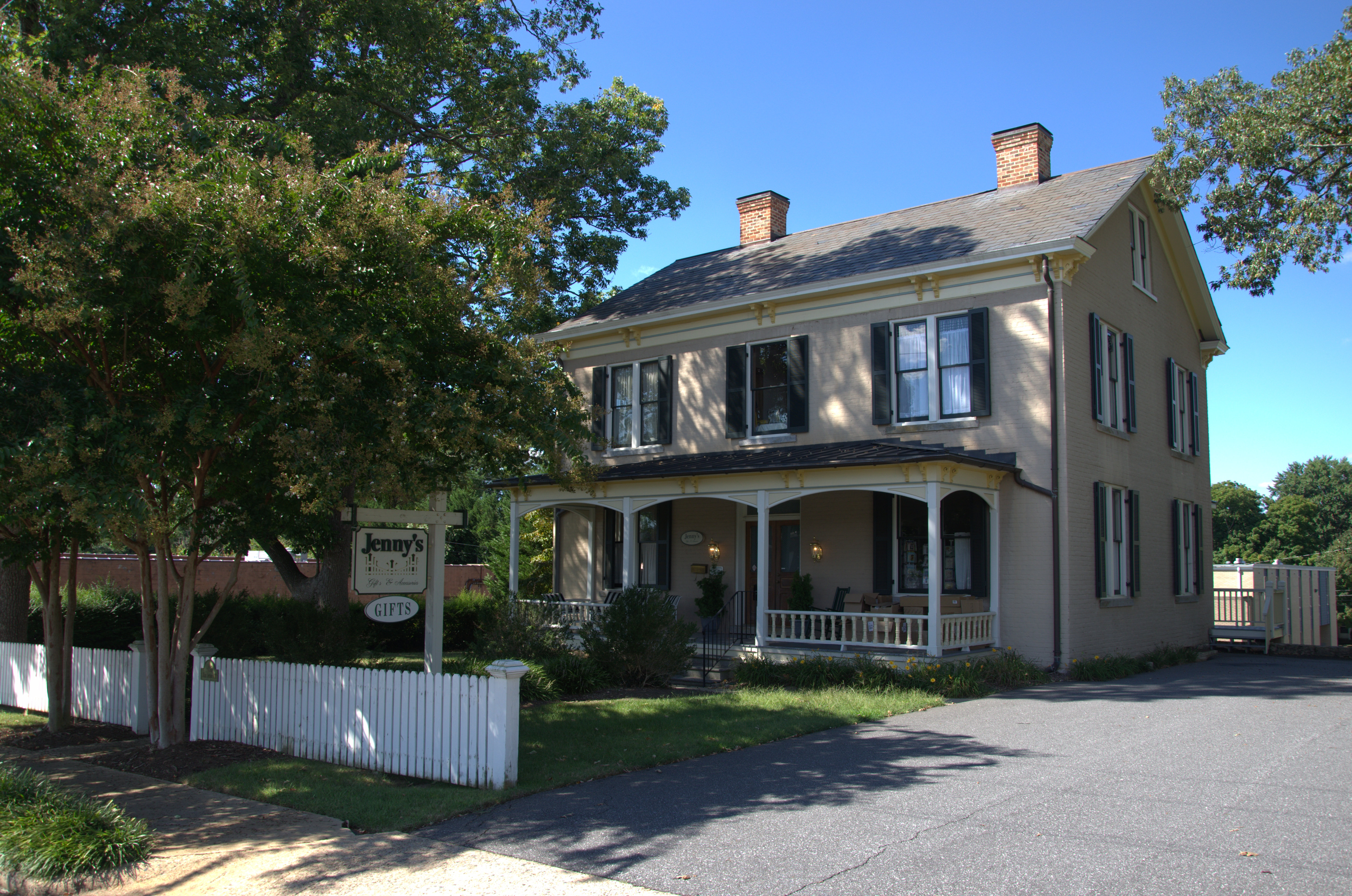
- Clement Geitner House, September 2012

- Location within North Carolina Location within the United States
- Location: 436 Main Ave. NW, Hickory, North Carolina
- Coordinates: 35°43′57″N 81°20′45″W
- Area: less than one acre
- Built: 1882
- MPS: Hickory MRA
- NRHP reference No.: 85000703
- Added to NRHP: March 15, 1985

Clement Geitner House is a historic home located at Hickory, Catawba County, North Carolina. It was built in 1882, and is a two-story, double pile brick dwelling on a stone foundation. It has a central hall plan and one-story full-width front porch. It has a large, 1 1/2-story brick veneer rear addition dated to the mid-20th century.

It was listed on the National Register of Historic Places in 1985.
