= Harris Arcade (Hickory, North Carolina) =

Historic building in North Carolina, US

- U.S. National Register of Historic Places
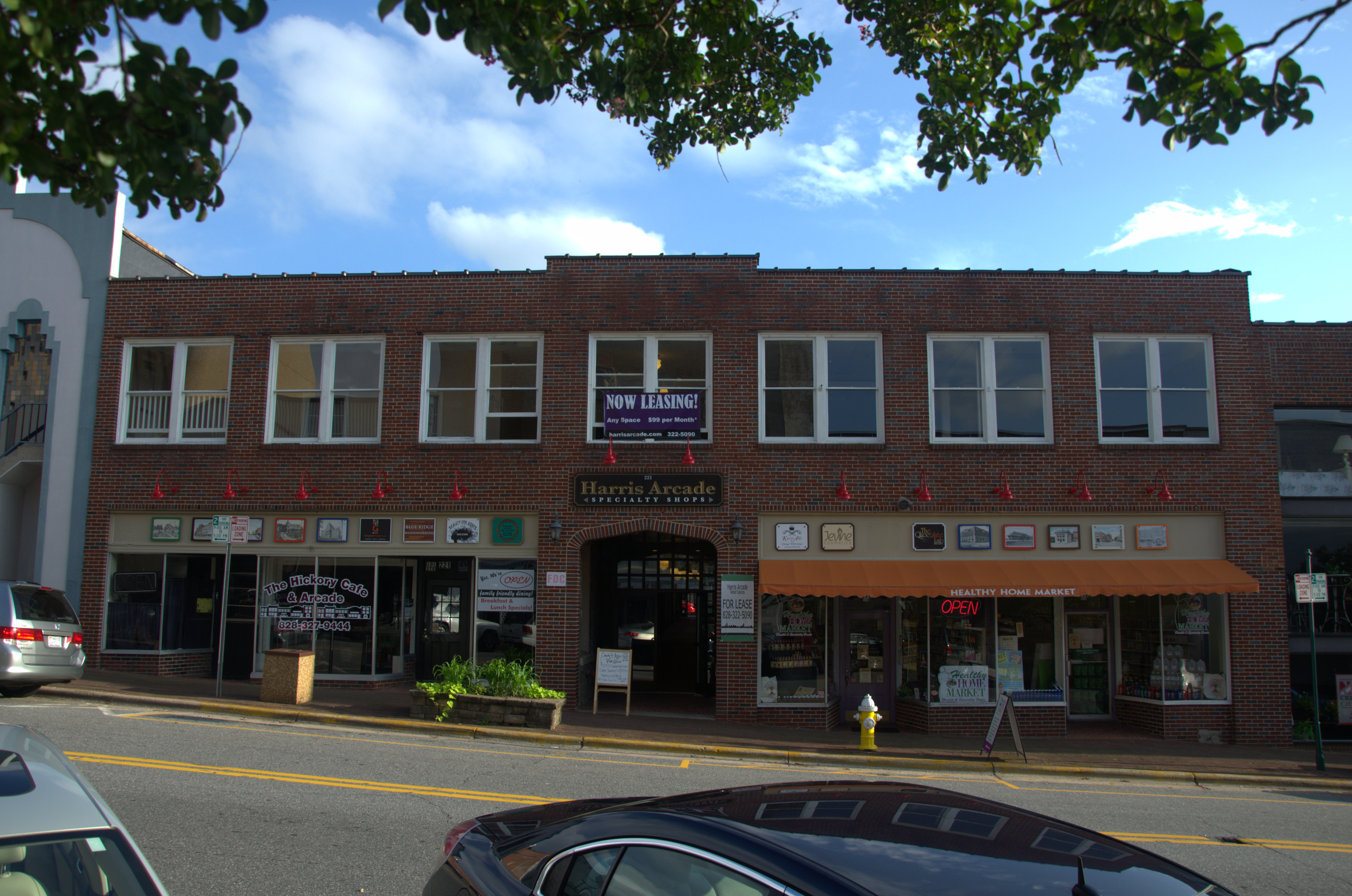
- Harris Arcade, September 2012

- Location within North Carolina Location within the United States
- Location: 221-229 1st Ave. NW., Hickory, North Carolina
- Coordinates: 35°43′59″N 81°20′27″W
- Area: less than one acre
- Built: 1938
- Architect: Herman, Quince Edward & Fannie Belle
- Architectural style: Early Commercial, Tudor Revival
- NRHP reference No.: 08000378
- Added to NRHP: May 8, 2008

Harris Arcade, also known as the Arcade Building, is a historic commercial building located at Hickory, Catawba County, North Carolina. It was built in 1938, and is a two-story, brick Commercial Style building, with Tudor Revival-Style arched arcade openings. It features an eight-foot wide arcade passage with a broken-tile terrazzo floor and intact late-interwar period commercial space.

It was listed on the National Register of Historic Places in 2008.
