= Hickory Southwest Downtown Historic District =

Historic district in North Carolina, United States

- U.S. National Register of Historic Places
- U.S. Historic district
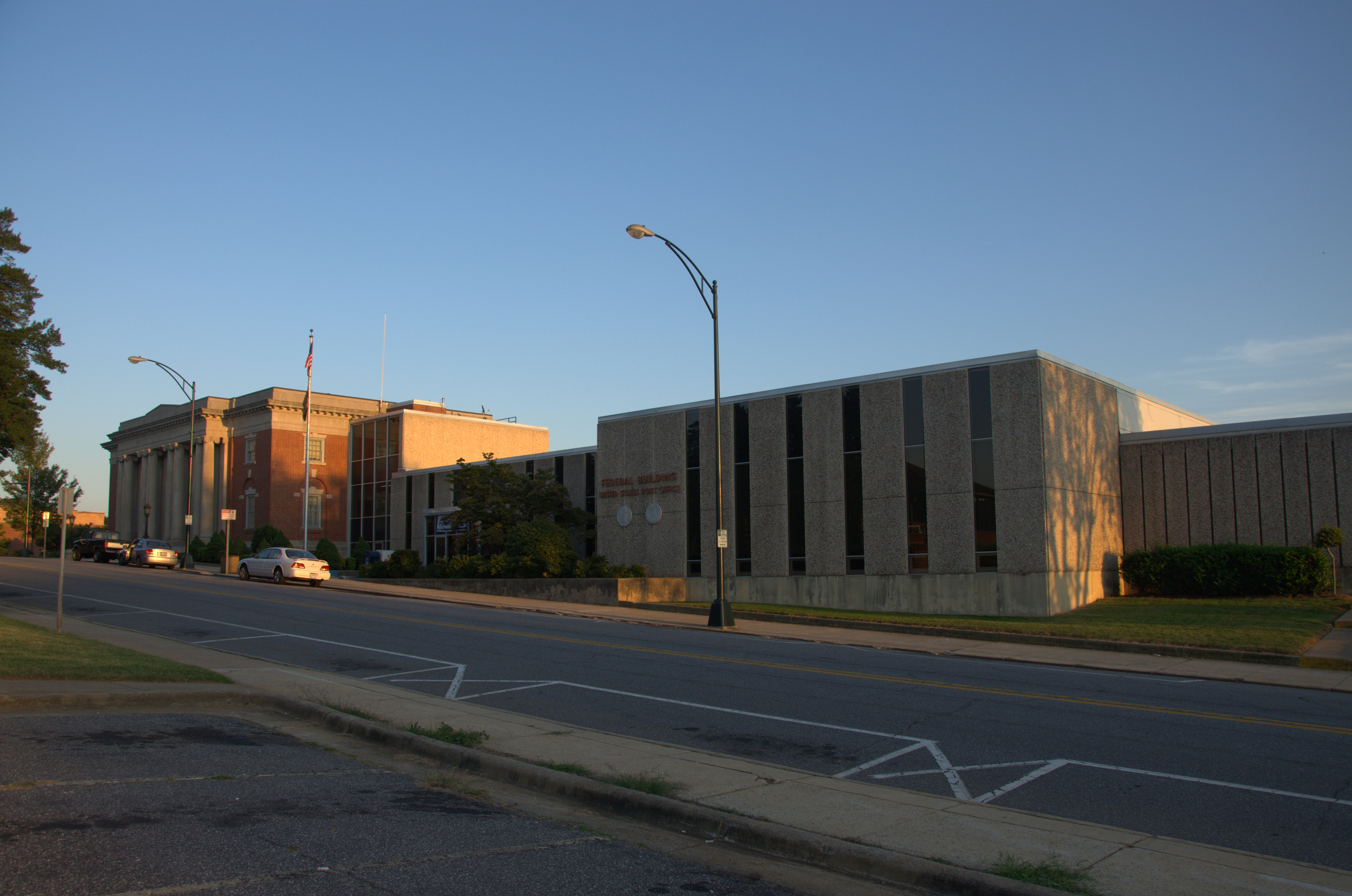
- U.S. Post Office, Hickory Southwest Downtown Historic District, September 2012

- Location within North Carolina Location within the United States
- Location: Portions of Government Ave.SE, Second Street Place SE, First Ave. SW and Third St. SW, Hickory, North Carolina
- Coordinates: 35°43′51″N 81°20′28″W
- Area: 10 acres (4.0 ha)
- Built: 1885
- Architect: Wenderoth, Oscar
- Architectural style: Classical Revival
- MPS: Hickory MRA
- NRHP reference No.: 05001409
- Added to NRHP: December 16, 2005

Hickory Southwest Downtown Historic District is a national historic district located at Hickory, Catawba County, North Carolina. The district encompasses 8 contributing buildings in the central business district of Hickory. Notable buildings include the Hickory Passenger Depot (1912), Classical Revival style U.S. Post Office (1914, 1961) designed by Office of the Supervising Architect under Oscar Wenderoth, Harper Motor Company (1928), Hickory Bonded Warehouse (c. 1885), Hickory Overall Office (c. 1922), Hickory Roller Covering Office (c. 1922), and the Armory (1911-1912).

It was added to the National Register of Historic Places in 2005.
