= Hollar Hosiery Mills-Knit Sox Knitting Mills =

Historic industrial building in North Carolina, US

- U.S. National Register of Historic Places
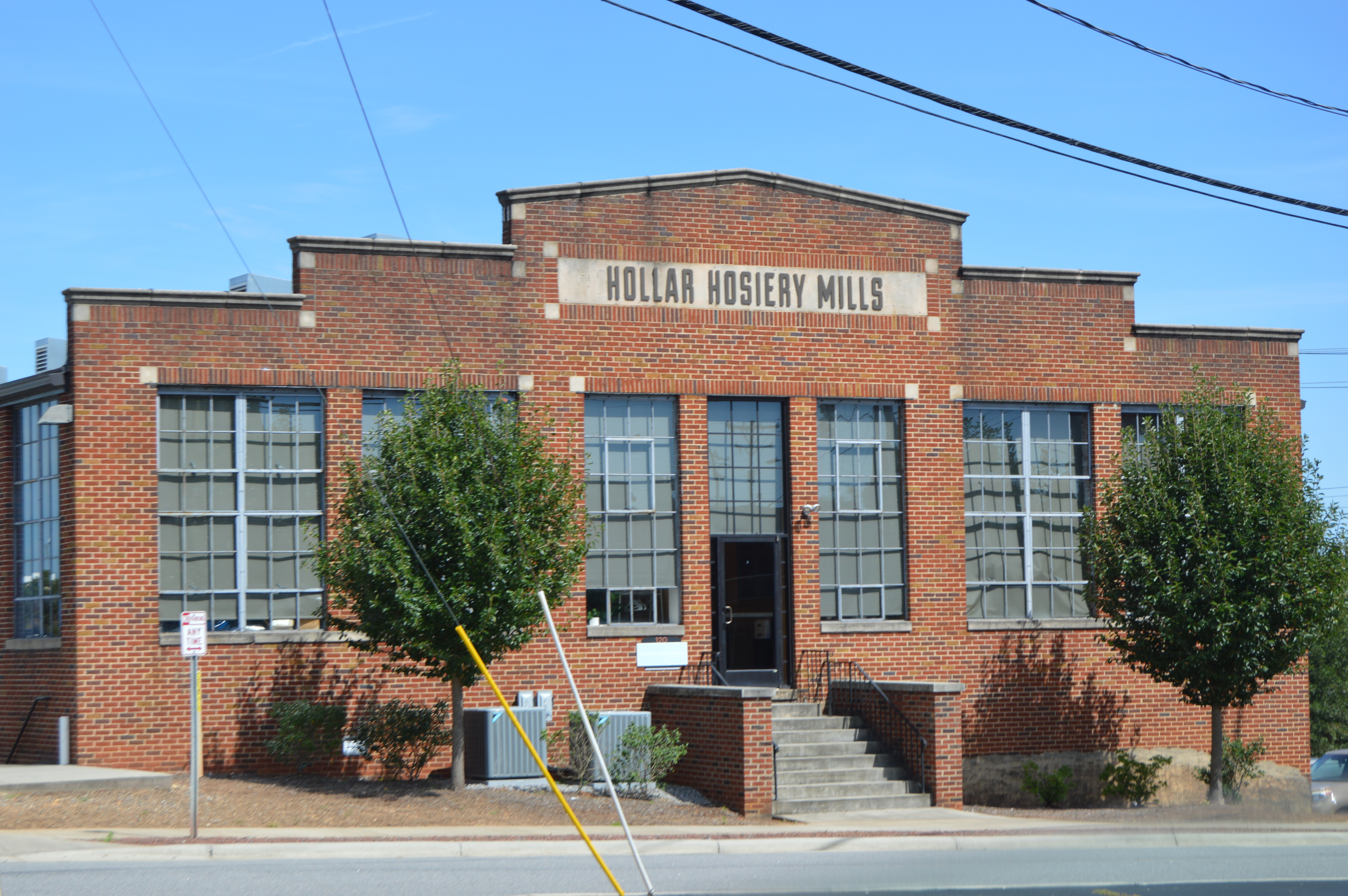
- Facade

- Location within North Carolina Location within the United States
- Location: 883 Highland Ave., SE, Hickory, North Carolina
- Coordinates: 35°44′07″N 81°19′32″W
- Area: 2.38 acres (0.96 ha)
- Built: c. 1930, c. 1940
- NRHP reference No.: 12001087
- Added to NRHP: December 26, 2012

Hollar Hosiery Mills-Knit Sox Knitting Mills is a historic knitting mill located at Hickory, Catawba County, North Carolina. It consists of two mill brick manufacturing buildings and a boiler house that were connected by a hyphen in the mid-1960s. The first mill building was built about 1930, and is a one- to two-story, 16 bay, brick veneer structure. The boiler house was also built about 1930, and is a small, brick building, with its flat roof and terra cotta coping. The hosiery yarn mill was built about 1940, and is two-story, six bay by 10 bay, brick-veneered building. Both mill buildings feature banks of steel-sash factory windows. The knitting mill operated until 1968.

It was listed on the National Register of Historic Places in 2012.
