= Piedmont Wagon Company =

Historic building in North Carolina, US

- U.S. National Register of Historic Places
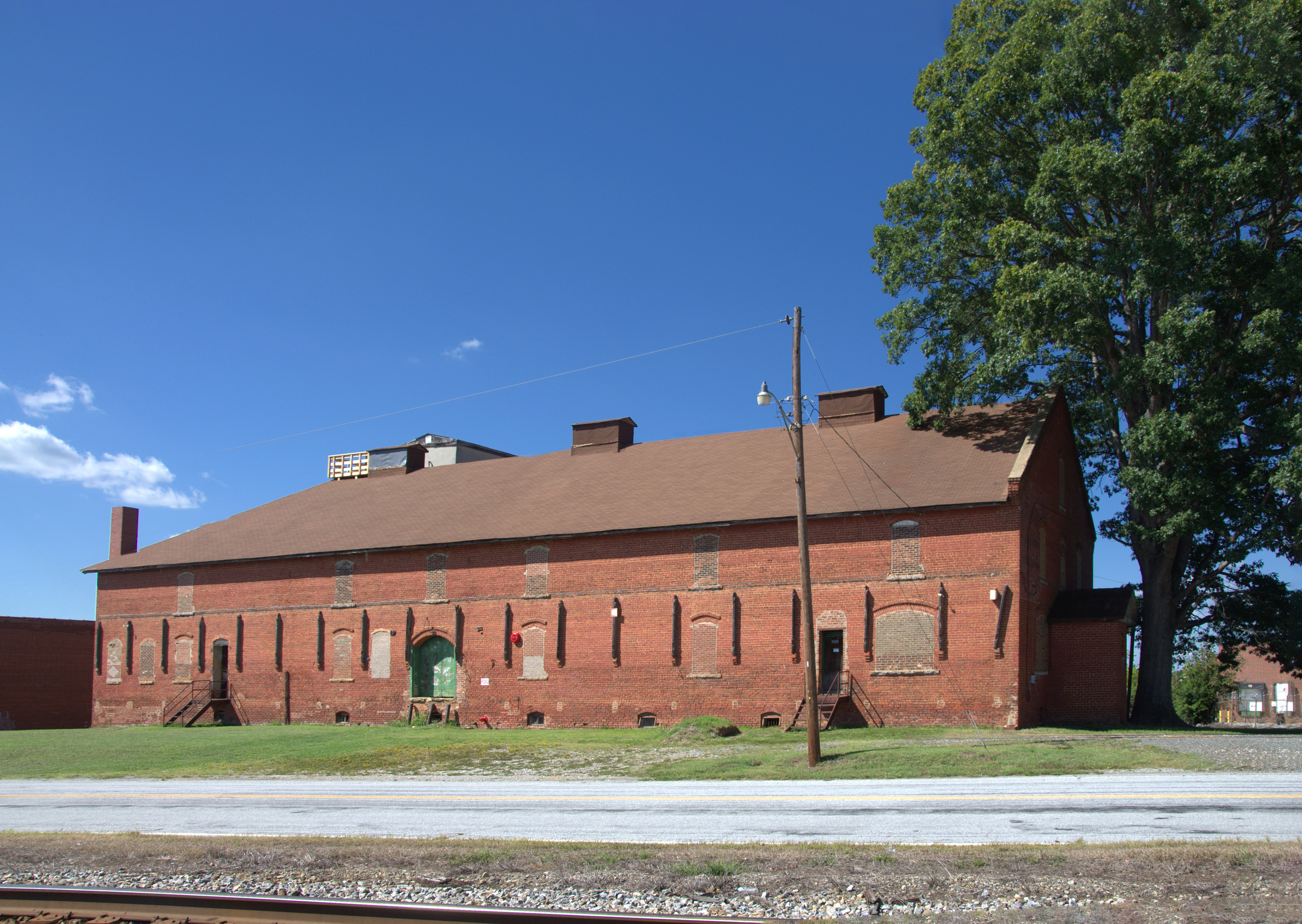
- Piedmont Wagon Company Building, September 2012

- Location within North Carolina Location within the United States
- Location: Main Ave. NW, Hickory, North Carolina
- Coordinates: 35°43′56″N 81°21′17″W
- Area: 1 acre (0.40 ha)
- Built: 1889
- MPS: Hickory MRA
- NRHP reference No.: 85000592
- Added to NRHP: March 15, 1985

Piedmont Wagon Company was a horse-drawn wagon works company in Hickory, Catawba County, North Carolina. Founded by George G. Bonniwell and A. L. (Andy) Ramseur in 1878, it became "one of the most conspicuous examples of New South prosperity in North Carolina" during the late 19th and early 20th centuries. One of the company's remaining buildings, constructed in 1889, is a 2 1/2-story L-shaped brick structure listed on the National Register of Historic Places in 1985. In 2015, the building was restored and repurposed as office space.
