= Hickory Municipal Building =

Historic building in North Carolina, US

- U.S. National Register of Historic Places
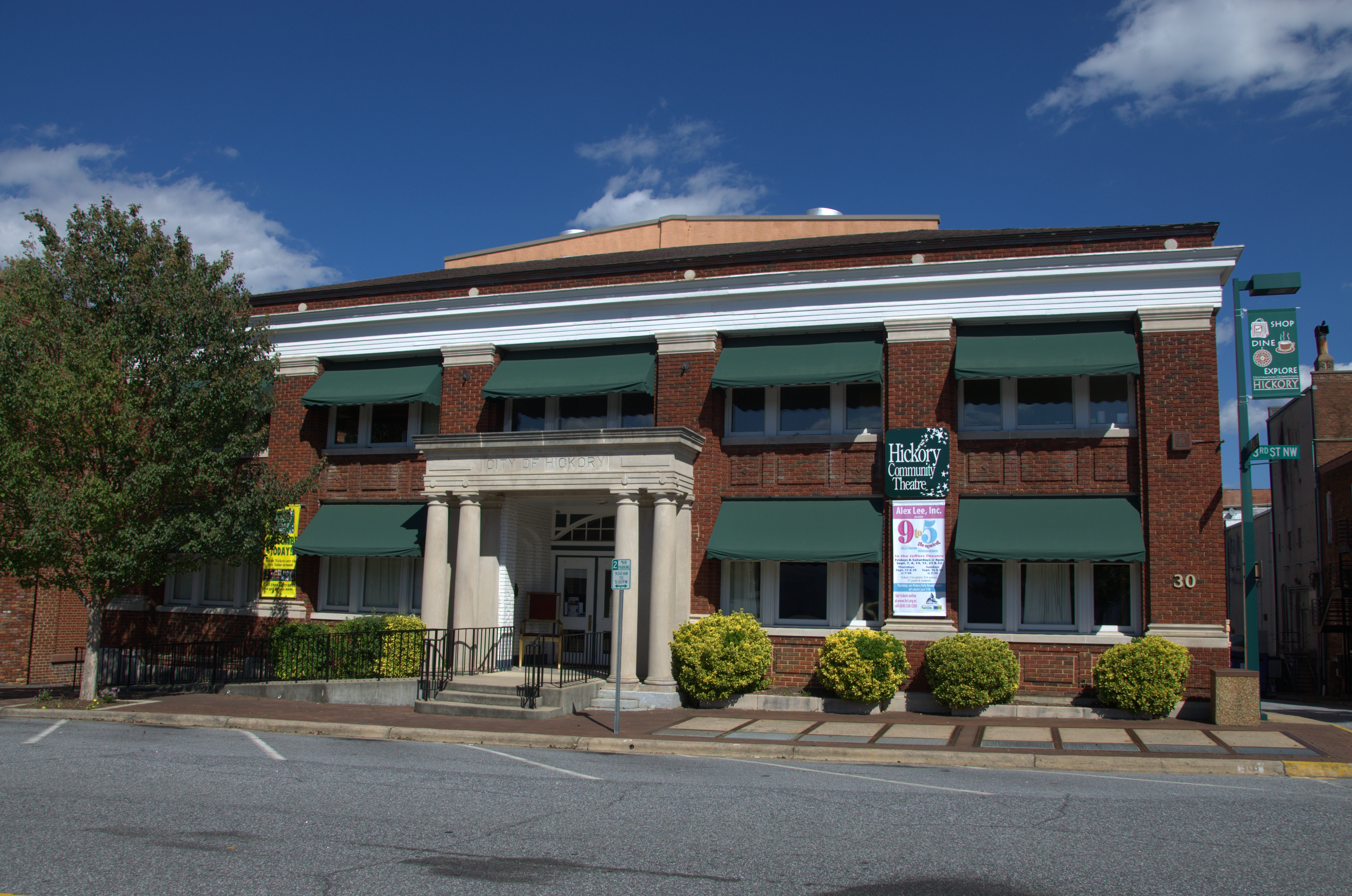
- Hickory Municipal Building, September 2012

- Location within North Carolina Location within the United States
- Location: 30 Third St., SW, Hickory, North Carolina
- Coordinates: 35°43′57″N 81°20′32″W
- Area: 0.4 acres (0.16 ha)
- Built: 1920-1921
- Architect: Hook, Charles Christian
- Architectural style: Classical Revival
- NRHP reference No.: 00000119
- Added to NRHP: February 18, 2000

Hickory Municipal Building is a historic municipal building located at Hickory, Catawba County, North Carolina. It was built in 1920–1921, and is a two-story brick building in the Classical Revival style. It has a three-story auditorium. The front facade features a one-story limestone portico, protecting the center entrance. In 1977, the city administrative offices were relocated to the new city hall. It houses the Hickory Community Theatre.

It was listed on the National Register of Historic Places in 2000.
