= Lyerly Full Fashioned Mill =

- U.S. National Register of Historic Places
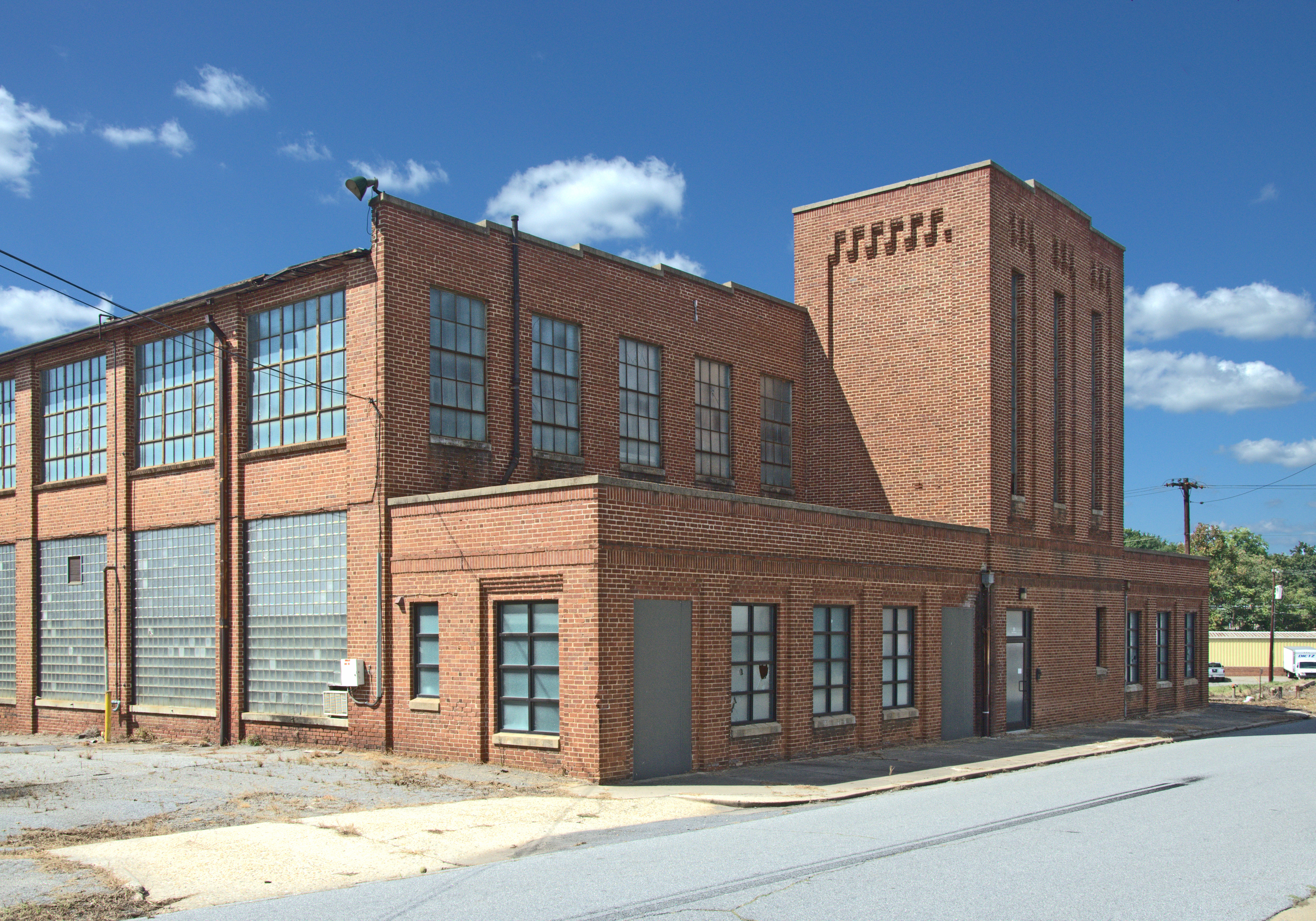
- Lyerly Full Fashioned Mill, September 2012

- Location within North Carolina Location within the United States
- Location: 310 Main Avenue Way SE (Formerly 56 Third Street SE) Hickory, North Carolina
- Coordinates: 35°44′1″N 81°19′59″W
- Area: 1.3 acres (0.53 ha)
- Built: 1930-1934
- Architect: Biberstein, Bowles, Meachem & Reed
- Architectural style: Moderne
- MPS: Hickory MRA
- NRHP reference No.: 06001137
- Added to NRHP: August 8, 2007

The Lyerly Full Fashioned Mill is a historic hosiery mill located in Hickory, Catawba County, North Carolina. It was built in two stages between 1930 and 1934, and is a two-story, rectangular, nine-by-twelve bay brick building. It features a Moderne-Style 2 1/2-story stair tower. The mill remained in operation until 1957, after which the building was used as a warehouse for a number of years.

The mill was listed on the National Register of Historic Places in 2007, but remained vacant until 2014, when the property was sold to Transportation Insight, a global multi-modal logistics company. The building underwent a significant rehabilitation between 2014 and 2015 to become the headquarters and flagship building for Transportation Insight's corporate campus. The property was designated a local historic landmark by the City of Hickory in 2016 and Transportation Insight received the 2016 North Carolina Main Street Award of Merit for Best Historic Rehabilitation for its work to save and rehabilitate the mill building.
