= Hickory, North Carolina =

- City
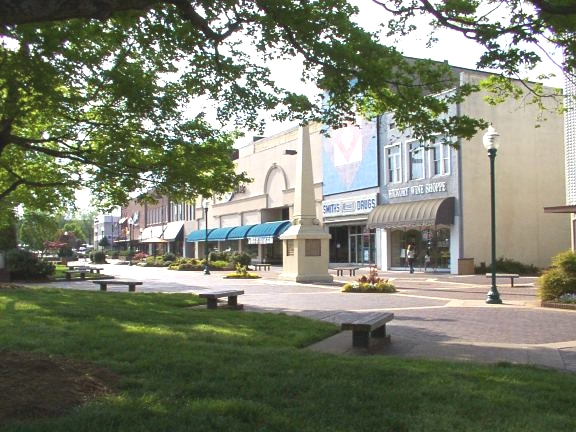
- Union Square in Downtown Hickory

- Flag Seal
- Motto: "Life Well Crafted."
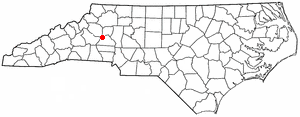
- Location in North Carolina
- Coordinates: 35°44′26″N 81°19′20″W
- Country: United States
- State: North Carolina
- Counties: Catawba, Burke, Caldwell
- Incorporated: 1870

Government
  - Type: Council–manager
  - Mayor: Hank Guess
  - City manager: Warren Wood

Area
  - City: 31.14 sq mi (80.66 km^{2})
  - Land: 31.04 sq mi (80.40 km^{2})
  - Water: 0.10 sq mi (0.26 km^{2})
- Elevation: 1,188 ft (362 m)

Population (2020)
  - City: 43,490
  - Density: 1,401.1/sq mi (540.95/km^{2})
  - Urban: 201,511 (US: 191st)
  - Urban density: 1,731.6/sq mi (668.6/km^{2})
  - Metro: 368,347 (US: 151st)
- Time zone: UTC−5 (EST)
  - Summer (DST): UTC−4 (EDT)
- ZIP codes: 28601-28603
- Area code: 828
- FIPS code: 37-31060
- GNIS feature ID: 2404693
- Website: www.hickorync.gov

Hickory is a city in western North Carolina primarily located in Catawba County. The 25th most populous city in the state, it is located approximately 60 miles (97 km) northwest of Charlotte.

Hickory's population in the 2022 United States Census Bureau estimate was 44,084. Hickory is the main city of the Hickory–Lenoir–Morganton Metropolitan Statistical Area, which had a population of 368,347 in the 2022 census, and is included in the larger Charlotte-Concord, NC Combined Statistical Area with a population of 3,387,115 in 2022.

== History ==
Hickory owes its name to the Hickory Tavern, a log structure built in the 1790s underneath a hickory tree. A monument built by the Hickory Tavern chapter of the Daughters of the American Revolution, resembling an old fireplace with an informational plaque marks the spot today. Per the monument, the tavern stood on a 640-acre tract of land surveyed by Col Christopher W. Beekman on 8 June 1779 and was granted to William McMullen on 28 Oct 1783. The Tavern sat on the north side of a road to Salisbury by way of Sherrill's Ford that had been petitioned by the inhabitants of Rowan County and approved on 10 May 1769 by a meeting of the Rowan County Court.

Henry Link bought the first lot in the area for $45 in 1858. The house he built was later adapted as The 1859 Cafe, a restaurant which closed in 2011.

The first train operated near Hickory Tavern in 1859. In 1868, Dr. Jeremiah Ingold, pastor of Corinth Reformed Church (then known as German Reformed Grace Church), established the Free Academy, the first school in the area. Hickory Tavern was incorporated as a town in 1870. Three years later, its name was officially changed to Hickory. In 1889, it became the City of Hickory.

Hickory grew rapidly in the 1880s. Electric lights were installed in 1888. A year later, the Elliott Opera House opened. Decorated in French renaissance style with mythological motifs, the opera house auditorium had seating for 750; the parquet balcony fit another 350. The opera house hosted touring out of town shows, the Hickory Amateurs (the city's first acting troupe), and The Hickory Symphony Band. A fire destroyed the entire building in 1902, and it was never rebuilt. A municipal auditorium was constructed across the street in 1921, and now houses the Hickory Community Theatre.

In 1891, four Lutheran pastors founded Highland Academy with 12 students. It has developed through the decades as Lenoir–Rhyne University.

Hickory built a sewage system in 1904. The city adopted the council-manager form of government in 1913, thus becoming the first municipality in the state to hire a city manager.

Hickory is home to one of the oldest furniture manufacturers in the United States that is still located and operated on the original site. Hickory White, formerly known as Hickory Manufacturing Company, was built in 1902 and has been in continuous operation ever since. During World War II, the factory made ammunition boxes for the U.S. military instead of furniture.

Hickory was known in the years after World War II for the "Miracle of Hickory". In 1944 the area around Hickory (the Catawba Valley) became the center of one of the worst outbreaks of polio ever recorded. Residents who were then children recall summers of not being allowed to play outside or visit friends for fear of contracting the infectious disease.

Since local facilities were inadequate to treat the victims, the citizens of Hickory and the March of Dimes decided to build a hospital to care for the children of the region. From the time the decision was made until equipment, doctors, and patients were in a new facility, took less than 54 hours. Several more buildings were quickly added. A Red Cross official on the scene praised the project "as the most outstanding example of cooperative effort he has ever seen."

In 2010, the city also came to national attention when the remains of a girl, Zahra Baker, were found. Following the police investigation, Zahra's stepmother, Elisa Baker, pleaded guilty to second-degree murder. The Zahra Baker All Children's playground, located in Kiwanis Park, is named in the girl's honor.

== Geography ==
Hickory is located in western Catawba County and extends westward into Burke County and Caldwell County. Interstate 40 passes through the southern part of the city, leading east 68 miles (109 km) to Winston-Salem and west 75 miles (121 km) to Asheville. U.S. Route 70 (Conover Boulevard) is an older east–west route through the city. U.S. Route 321 passes through the western part of the city, leading northwest 43 miles (69 km) to Boone and south 36 miles (58 km) to Gastonia.

According to the United States Census Bureau, the city has a total area of 29.8 square miles (77.2 km^{2}), of which 29.7 square miles (76.9 km^{2}) is land and 0.08 square miles (0.2 km^{2}), or 0.31%, is water.

=== Lake Hickory ===
Lake Hickory was created on the Catawba River in 1927 with the completion of the Oxford Dam 11 miles (18 km) northeast of Hickory. The dam parallels the NC Highway 16 bridge over the Catawba River between Interstate 40 and Taylorsville. It is 122 feet (37 m) high, with an overall length of 1,200 feet (370 m). The spillway section of the dam is 550 feet (170 m) long.

Lake Hickory was named after the City of Hickory and runs along its northern edge. The lake covers almost 4,223 acres (17.09 km^{2}) with 105 miles (169 km) of shoreline. Full pond elevation is 935 feet (285 m). Lake Hickory is a reliable source of water for the Cities of Hickory and Conover and the Town of Long View, while also functioning as a recreation hub for boating, fishing, and other water based activities.

Duke Energy provides five public access areas on the lake in cooperation with the North Carolina Wildlife Resources Commission.

=== Metropolitan area ===
Hickory is the largest city within the Hickory–Lenoir–Morganton metropolitan area. The Metropolitan Statistical Area (MSA) includes Catawba County, Burke County, Caldwell County, and Alexander County, with a combined population – as of the 2020 Census – of 365,276.

In addition to Hickory, the MSA includes the cities of Lenoir, Morganton, Conover, and Newton, along with a number of smaller incorporated towns and cities.

Several unincorporated rural and suburban communities located nearby include Bethlehem, Mountain View, and St. Stephens.

=== Climate ===
According to the Köppen Climate Classification system, Hickory has a humid subtropical climate, abbreviated "Cfa" on climate maps. The hottest temperature recorded in Hickory was 105 °F (40.6 °C) on July 28–29, 1952, while the coldest temperature recorded was −8 °F (−22.2 °C) on January 21, 1985.

Climate data for Hickory, North Carolina (Hickory Regional Airport), 1991–2020 normals, extremes 1949–present
Month	Jan	Feb	Mar	Apr	May	Jun	Jul	Aug	Sep	Oct	Nov	Dec	Year
Record high °F (°C)	80 (27)	83 (28)	86 (30)	92 (33)	97 (36)	104 (40)	105 (41)	104 (40)	99 (37)	96 (36)	85 (29)	78 (26)	105 (41)
Mean maximum °F (°C)	68.8 (20.4)	72.2 (22.3)	79.0 (26.1)	84.1 (28.9)	89.4 (31.9)	93.5 (34.2)	95.5 (35.3)	94.2 (34.6)	90.2 (32.3)	84.0 (28.9)	75.5 (24.2)	69.2 (20.7)	96.5 (35.8)
Mean daily maximum °F (°C)	49.1 (9.5)	53.2 (11.8)	60.7 (15.9)	70.0 (21.1)	77.4 (25.2)	84.3 (29.1)	87.4 (30.8)	85.7 (29.8)	79.8 (26.6)	70.2 (21.2)	59.9 (15.5)	51.5 (10.8)	69.1 (20.6)
Daily mean °F (°C)	39.7 (4.3)	43.0 (6.1)	50.1 (10.1)	58.8 (14.9)	66.8 (19.3)	74.3 (23.5)	77.7 (25.4)	76.4 (24.7)	70.4 (21.3)	59.6 (15.3)	49.3 (9.6)	42.2 (5.7)	59.0 (15.0)
Mean daily minimum °F (°C)	30.2 (−1.0)	32.8 (0.4)	39.5 (4.2)	47.7 (8.7)	56.2 (13.4)	64.4 (18.0)	68.1 (20.1)	67.0 (19.4)	60.9 (16.1)	48.9 (9.4)	38.7 (3.7)	32.8 (0.4)	48.9 (9.4)
Mean minimum °F (°C)	13.7 (−10.2)	18.1 (−7.7)	22.9 (−5.1)	32.3 (0.2)	41.7 (5.4)	53.5 (11.9)	60.9 (16.1)	59.0 (15.0)	48.4 (9.1)	34.0 (1.1)	24.6 (−4.1)	19.1 (−7.2)	11.7 (−11.3)
Record low °F (°C)	−8 (−22)	2 (−17)	9 (−13)	20 (−7)	30 (−1)	41 (5)	50 (10)	45 (7)	35 (2)	24 (−4)	10 (−12)	1 (−17)	−8 (−22)
Average precipitation inches (mm)	3.81 (97)	3.21 (82)	4.08 (104)	4.08 (104)	3.86 (98)	4.35 (110)	4.29 (109)	4.58 (116)	3.93 (100)	3.49 (89)	3.62 (92)	3.85 (98)	47.15 (1,199)
Average snowfall inches (cm)	4.2 (11)	1.6 (4.1)	1.3 (3.3)	0.3 (0.76)	0.0 (0.0)	0.0 (0.0)	0.0 (0.0)	0.0 (0.0)	0.0 (0.0)	0.0 (0.0)	0.0 (0.0)	0.3 (0.76)	7.7 (19.92)
Average precipitation days (≥ 0.01 in)	9.4	9.1	11.0	10.0	10.9	11.6	12.1	10.7	8.6	7.6	8.4	9.0	118.4
Average snowy days (≥ 0.1 in)	0.9	0.7	0.3	0.1	0.0	0.0	0.0	0.0	0.0	0.0	0.0	0.3	2.3
Source 1: NOAA (snow/snow days 1981–2010)
Source 2: National Weather Service

== Demographics ==
Historical population
Census	Pop.	Note	%±
1890	2,023		—
1900	2,535		25.3%
1910	3,716		46.6%
1920	5,076		36.6%
1930	7,363		45.1%
1940	13,487		83.2%
1950	14,755		9.4%
1960	19,328		31.0%
1970	20,569		6.4%
1980	20,757		0.9%
1990	28,301		36.3%
2000	37,222		31.5%
2010	40,010		7.5%
2020	43,490		8.7%
2025 (est.)	45,975	▲	5.7%
U.S. Decennial Census

=== 2020 census ===
Racial composition as of the 2020 census
Race	Number	Percentage
White	28,904	66.5%
Black or African American	5,995	13.8%
American Indian and Alaska Native	304	0.7%
Asian	1,692	3.9%
Native Hawaiian and Other Pacific Islander	38	0.1%
Some other race	3,098	7.1%
Two or more races	3,459	8.0%
Hispanic or Latino (of any race)	5,573	12.8%

As of the 2020 census, Hickory had a population of 43,490 and 18,273 households, and there were 9,834 families residing in the city. 26.6% of households had children under the age of 18 living in them.

The median age was 41.0 years. 21.0% of residents were under the age of 18 and 19.0% were 65 years of age or older. For every 100 females there were 90.0 males, and for every 100 females age 18 and over there were 86.5 males age 18 and over.

99.4% of residents lived in urban areas, while 0.6% lived in rural areas.

Of all households, 38.7% were married-couple households, 20.2% were households with a male householder and no spouse or partner present, and 33.7% were households with a female householder and no spouse or partner present. About 35.6% of all households were made up of individuals, and 14.5% had someone living alone who was 65 years of age or older.

There were 20,064 housing units, of which 8.9% were vacant. The homeowner vacancy rate was 1.8% and the rental vacancy rate was 8.5%.

=== 2010 census ===
As of the census of 2010, there were 40,093 people, 18,719 households, and 9,952 families residing in the city. There were 18,719 housing units at an average density of 640.4 per square mile (247.3/km^{2}). The racial composition of the city was: 74.9% White, 14.3% Black or African American, 11.4% Hispanic or Latino American, 3.2% Asian American, 0.19% Native American, 0.06% Native Hawaiian or Other Pacific Islander, 3.08% some other race, and 1.46% two or more races.

There were 18,719 households, out of which 27.9% had children under the age of 18 living with them, 44.6% were married couples living together, 12.3% had a female householder with no husband present, and 39.1% were non-families. 32.2% of all households were made up of individuals, and 10.9% had someone living alone who was 65 years of age or older. The average household size was 2.35 and the average family size was 2.98.

In the city, the age distribution of the population shows 23.3% under the age of 18, 11.2% from 18 to 24, 30.7% from 25 to 44, 21.3% from 45 to 64, and 13.6% who were 65 years of age or older. The median age was 35 years. For every 100 females, there were 92.8 males. For every 100 females age 18 and over, there were 89.7 males.

The median income for a household in the city was $37,236, and the median income for a family was $47,522. Males had a median income of $31,486 versus $23,666 for females. The per capita income for the city was $23,263. About 8.4% of families and 11.3% of the population were below the poverty line, including 14.8% of those under age 18 and 7.0% of those age 65 or over.

364,759 people live within 25 miles (40 km) of Hickory; 1.8 million people live within 50 miles (80 km) of Hickory.

== Economy ==
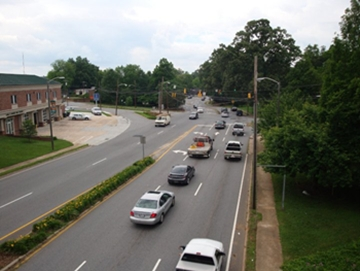
Intersection of 1st Avenue NE and NC 127 near Downtown Hickory

Early industries such as wagon-making, as well as proximity to expansive forests and excellent transportation via two intersecting railroads, provided fertile ground for the emergence of the furniture industry. Likewise experience with textile manufacturing and easy access to power drove new industries in both fiber-optic cable and pressure-sensitive tape. Forty percent of the world's fiber optic cable is made in the Hickory area.

Adhesive tape manufacturer Shurtape Technologies is based in Hickory, with network infrastructure provider CommScope having a facility in nearby Claremont.

The furniture industry in Hickory is not as strong as in previous decades, but is still a primary component in the area economy. HSM (company) (formerly Hickory Springs, founded 1944) is a leading manufacturer of mattress coils. It is estimated 60% of the nation's furniture used to be produced within a 200-mile (320 km) radius of Hickory.

The Hickory area is marketed as a data-center corridor and is home to large data centers operated by Apple and Google. Apple's billion-dollar data center campus just south of Hickory is one of the world's largest.

Hickory is home to the corporate headquarters of third-party logistics provider Transportation Insight, a member of North Carolina's top revenue tier of privately held businesses. In 2015, the company relocated its headquarters to the historic Lyerly Full Fashioned Mill in downtown Hickory.

=== Major Industries ===
- Manufacturing
- Education
- Healthcare
- Retail Trade
- Professional, scientific, and management
- Public Administration
- Transportation
- Construction

=== Major employers ===
- Catawba Valley Medical Center
- Frye Regional Medical Center/Duke LifePoint
- MDI
- Hickory Springs Manufacturing
- Corning Inc.
- CommScope
- Convergys
- Century Furniture
- City of Hickory
- Catawba Valley Community College
- Performance Food Group
- Hickory Public Schools
- Sherrill Furniture Company
- Fiserv
- Transportation Insight
- Catawba County
- Catawba County Schools
- ITM
- Cataler North America

== Arts and culture ==
=== Hickory Museum of Art ===
Hickory is home to the second oldest art museum in North Carolina. Hickory Museum of Art was established in 1944 by Founding Director, Paul Whitener. The museum is housed at the SALT Block, overseen by the SALT Block Foundation, along with the Catawba Science Center, Hickory Choral Society, United Arts Council and Western Piedmont Symphony. Hickory Museum of Art (HMA) holds exhibitions, events, and public educational programs based on a permanent collection of 19th through 21st century American art. The museum also features a long-term exhibition of Southern contemporary folk art, showcasing the work of self-taught artists from around the region.

=== Western Piedmont Symphony ===
The symphony hosts several series of concerts, including their free Foothills Pops concerts held annually in Downtown Hickory.

=== Hickory Aviation Museum ===
Hickory Aviation Museum is an aerospace museum at the Hickory Regional Airport. The museum originated from the Sabre Society co-founded by Kyle and Kregg Kirby, when an FJ-3 Fury, the Naval version of the North American F-86 Sabre was recovered and became the first aircraft of the museum. It features a museum located in the former airport terminal with artifacts, a hangar with aircraft and outdoor exhibits of aircraft on the former airport ramp.

=== National Register of Historic Places ===
The Claremont High School Historic District, Elliott–Carnegie Library, First Presbyterian Church, Dr. Glenn R. Frye House, Clement Geitner House, Lee & Helen George House, Harris Arcade, Hickory Municipal Building, Hickory Southwest Downtown Historic District, Highland School, Hollar Hosiery Mills-Knit Sox Knitting Mills, Houck's Chapel, Kenworth Historic District, John A. Lentz House, Lyerly Full Fashioned Mill, John Alfred Moretz House, Oakwood Historic District, Piedmont Wagon Company, Propst House, Ridgeview Public Library, Shuford House, and Whisnant Hosiery Mills are listed on the National Register of Historic Places.

== Sports ==
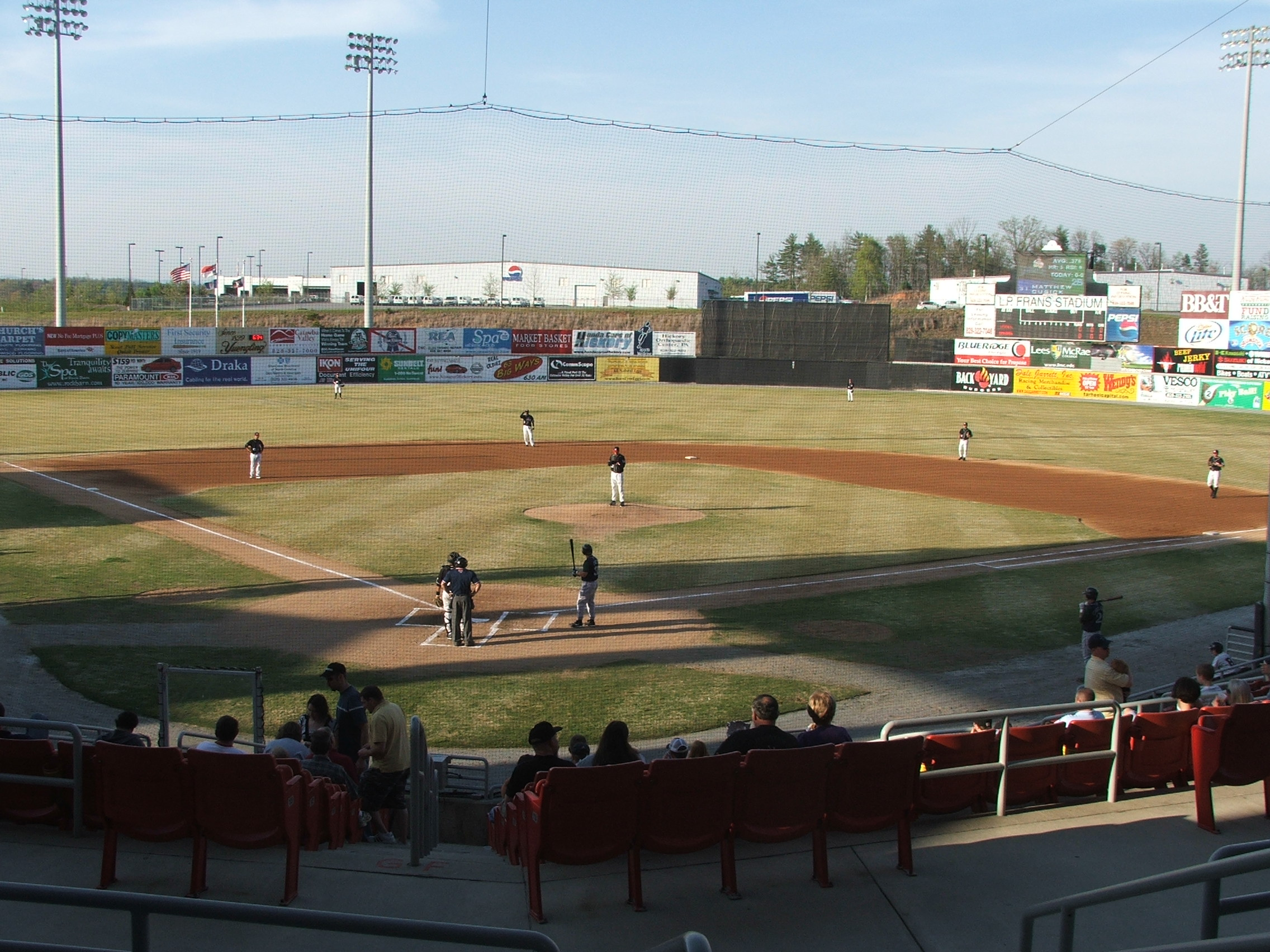
L. P. Frans Stadium, home of the Hickory Crawdads

Hickory is home to Hickory F.C., a local football club well known for being perennial overachievers having rose to the heights of the highest semi-pro, U.S.-based, soccer league. Hickory F.C. won the 2025 national championship in the National Premier Soccer League and consequently, was promoted to the United Soccer League, League Two (essentially the fourth division and three below, the MLS). The national championship victory was historic in the sense that the club had only been founded just a few years prior. Hickory F.C. plays in Moretz Stadium, where a home attendance record of over 6,247 people was achieved.

Hickory also hosts the Hickory Crawdads, the Single-A Minor League Baseball affiliate of the Texas Rangers of the Carolina League. The Crawdads play at L. P. Frans Stadium, located in the western portion of the city, near the Hickory Regional Airport.

Hickory is also home to the Hickory Motor Speedway. The speedway was opened in 1951 and features a 1/2-mile track with seating for approximately 5,000 spectators.

Lenoir-Rhyne University, whose teams have the nickname "Bears", participates within NCAA Division II athletics in the South Atlantic Conference. The university's athletics program includes teams in baseball, basketball, cross country, football, golf, lacrosse, soccer, softball, swimming, tennis, track and field, triathlon, and volleyball.

== Government ==
In 1913, Hickory became the first city in North Carolina to adopt the council-manager form of municipal government, which combines the leadership of elected officials and the administrative experience of a city manager. The mayor and city council set policy and hire a non-partisan manager to oversee city operations, advise council, and implement adopted policies and ordinances.

Hickory City Council is composed of a mayor and six council members, each representing one of the city's six wards. For current listing of council members, see here.

== Education ==
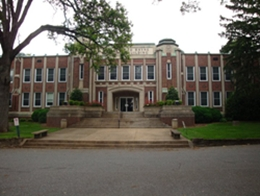
Lenoir–Rhyne University

Within Catawba County, much of Hickory is in the Hickory City Schools school district. Portions of Hickory in that county is in the Catawba County Schools school district. All of Caldwell County, including its portions of Hickory, are within the Caldwell County Schools school district.

=== Elementary schools ===
- Clyde Campbell Elementary School
- Jenkins Elementary School
- Longview Elementary School
- Oakwood Elementary School
- Snow Creek Elementary School
- Southwest Primary School
- Viewmont Elementary School
- Webb A. Murray Elementary School
- St. Stephens Elementary School

=== Middle schools ===
- Grandview Middle School
- Northview Middle School
- H. M. Arndt Middle School

=== High schools ===
- Hickory High School
- Challenger Early College High School
- Hickory Career and Arts Magnet High School
- St. Stephens High School

=== Private schools ===
- St. Stephens Lutheran School
- University Christian High School
- Hickory Christian Academy
- Hickory Day School
- Tabernacle Christian School
- Christian Family Academy
- Cornerstone Christian Academy (Specialized for students with learning differences)

=== Colleges and universities ===
- Catawba Valley Community College
- Lenoir–Rhyne University
- North Carolina Center for Engineering Technologies
- Appalachian State University Hickory Campus

== Media ==
- The Hickory Daily Record is published daily.
- Focus Newspaper is a free weekly publication, distributed every Thursday in print, online, and mobile app. Focus features local news and events, movie reviews, original columnists, places to go and things to do.
- WHKY, 1290 AM, is a radio station that features a news-talk format.
- WAIZ, "63 Big Ways", 630 AM, is a radio station that features music from the 1950s and 1960s. Its branding is an homage to the former "61 Big Ways" radio station (now WFNZ) in Charlotte, North Carolina.
- The local television station is WWJS, channel 14 (formerly WHKY-TV).
- The Claremont Courier is a free newspaper distributed every month throughout Catawba County

== Infrastructure ==
=== Transportation ===
==== Air ====
Hickory Regional Airport supports general-aviation activity, including pilot training and private flights. During the Hurricane Helene relief efforts in 2024, volunteer pilots used the airport as a staging point for supply deliveries and evacuation operations.

==== Public transportation ====
Greenway Public Transportation operates six fixed bus routes around Hickory, Conover and Newton. Greenway also provides paratransit services to these cities and surrounding areas. Greenway Public Transportation provides over 250,000 trips each year to residents living in the Hickory region.

==== Highways ====
- I-40
- U.S. Highway 321
- U.S. Highway 321 Business
- U.S. Highway 70
- North Carolina Hwy 16
- North Carolina Hwy 127

== Notable people ==
=== Athletes ===
- Jeff Barkley, MLB player
- Rick Barnes, college basketball head coach
- Madison Bumgarner, MLB pitcher, 4-time All-Star selection, 3-time World Series champion and 2014 World Series MVP with the San Francisco Giants
- Paul Burris, MLB catcher
- Zoey Carroll, wakeboarder
- Ozzie Clay, NFL safety
- Matt DiBenedetto, NASCAR driver
- Landon Dickerson, NFL offensive lineman, 3-time Pro Bowl selection, Super Bowl LIX champion with the Philadelphia Eagles
- Rob Dillingham, NBA player, 2024 NBA draft 1st round, 8th overall pick
- Harry Dowda, NFL defensive back
- Charlie Frye, MLB pitcher
- Robert Griswold, swimmer
- Ryan Hill, long-distance runner, silver medalist in the 3000 meters at the 2016 World Indoor Championships, gold medalist in the 5000 meters at the 2015 USA Outdoor Championships
- Andy Houston, NASCAR Cup Series, Xfinity Series and Truck Series driver
- Marty Houston, NASCAR Xfinity Series driver
- Tommy Houston, NASCAR Cup Series and Xfinity Series driver
- Dale Jarrett, 1999 NASCAR Cup Series champion, 3-time Daytona 500 champion, member of the NASCAR Hall of Fame
- Austin Johnson, NFL fullback
- Brad Knighton, Major League Soccer (MLS) goalkeeper
- Chad Lail, professional WWE wrestler
- Bobby Lutz, college basketball coach, former UNC Charlotte men's basketball head coach
- Dick Marlowe, MLB pitcher
- Trevin Parks, professional basketball player
- Andy Petree, NASCAR crew chief and analyst
- J.T. Poston, PGA Tour player
- Gary Sain, NASCAR Cup Series driver
- Ryan Succop, NFL kicker, Super Bowl LV champion with the Tampa Bay Buccaneers
- Bob Warlick, NBA player, younger brother of Ernie Warlick
- Ernie Warlick, AFL player and 4-time AFL All-Star selection for the Buffalo Bills
- Chris Washburn, NBA player

=== Entertainers ===
- James Best, actor and musician
- Tom Constanten, musician, composer, former member of the Grateful Dead and member of the Rock and Roll Hall of Fame
- Jon Reep, comedian
- Matthew Settle, actor
- Drew Starkey, actor
- Brandon Wardell, comedian
- Hermene Warlick Eichhorn, composer
- Machinedrum, aka Travis Stewart, musician
- The Blue Sky Boys, country music duo

=== Other notables ===
- Cass Ballenger, politician
- Norma Bonniwell, architect
- James Broselow, emergency physician, assistant professor, and entrepreneur
- Teresa Earnhardt, former NASCAR team owner
- Fannie Gaston-Johansson, professor of nursing and distinguished professor at Johns Hopkins University
- Gary Glenn, Michigan House of Representatives (2015–18), Associate Speaker of the House Pro Tem and chairman of the House Energy Policy Committee (2017–18)
- Pat Harrigan, U.S. congressman
- Kenneth Lamar Holland, former Democratic member of the United States House of Representatives
- Chris Hughes, co-founder of Facebook
- E. Patrick Johnson, ethnographer, scholar in critical race theory, queer theory, and performance studies
- Brock Long, FEMA Administrator
- J.B. Long, store manager/owner and record company talent scout
- Douglas E. Moore, Methodist minister and civil rights activist
- Scott Owens, poet, teacher, and editor
- William Powlas Peery, pastor of the Evangelical Lutheran Church in America
- Elwood L. Perry, inventor of the form of fishing lure known as the spoonplug
- Paul Whitener, landscape painter and founder of the Hickory Museum of Art

== Sister cities ==
- Altenburg, Germany

== See also ==
- Hickory Aviation Museum
- Henry Fork (South Fork Catawba River tributary)
- Valley Hills Mall
