= Conover, North Carolina =

- City
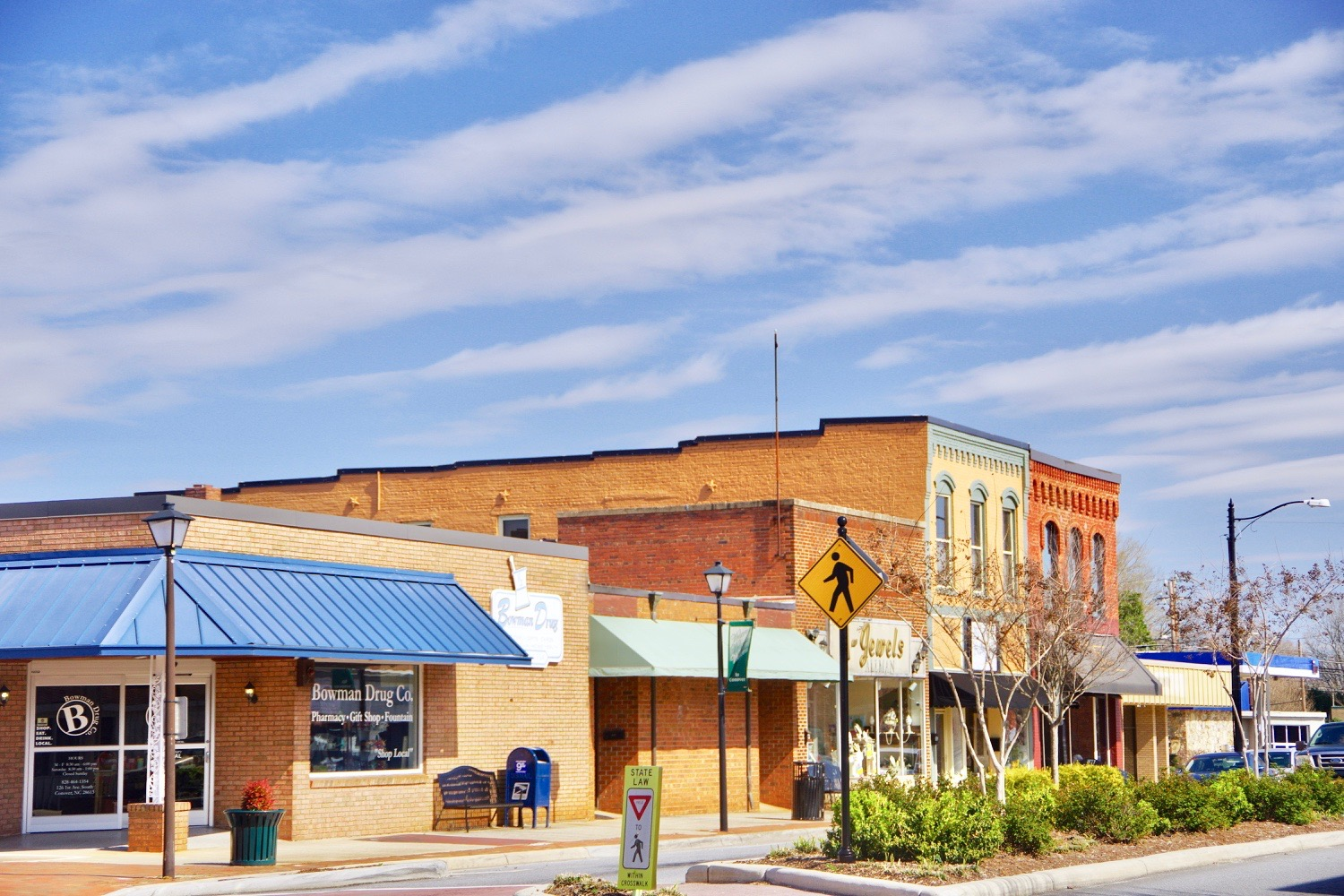
- Commercial buildings on 1st Avenue (NC 16)

- Flag Seal
- Nicknames: "Wye Town", "Canova", “C-Town”
- Motto: "Community and Industry"
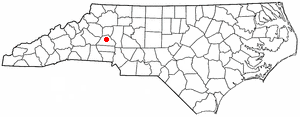
- Location of Conover, North Carolina
- Coordinates: 35°42′40″N 81°13′11″W
- Country: United States
- State: North Carolina
- County: Catawba
- Established: 1876–77

Government
  - Type: Council–manager
  - Mayor: Kyle Hayman
  - City Manager: Tom Hart

Area
  - Total: 11.20 sq mi (29.01 km^{2})
  - Land: 11.17 sq mi (28.93 km^{2})
  - Water: 0.031 sq mi (0.08 km^{2})
- Elevation: 1,020 ft (310 m)

Population (2020)
  - Total: 8,421
  - Density: 753.8/sq mi (291.05/km^{2})
- Time zone: UTC−5 (Eastern (EST))
  - Summer (DST): UTC−4 (EDT)
- ZIP Code: 28613
- Area code: 828
- FIPS code: 37-14340
- GNIS feature ID: 2404118
- Website: www.conovernc.gov

Conover is a city in Catawba County, North Carolina, United States. The population was 8,421 as of the 2020 census. It is part of the Hickory–Lenoir–Morganton metropolitan area and the Charlotte metropolitan area.

== History ==
The City of Conover began to develop in the mid-1800s as a “Y” intersection of the railroad traversing North Carolina. Although originally called Wye Town, legend says the name "Canova" was adopted, but transposed to Conover over several years. The City of Conover was chartered in 1876 and incorporated in 1877.

The Bolick Historic District and George Huffman Farm are listed on the National Register of Historic Places.

== Geography ==
Conover is located in the geographic center, as well as the population center, of Catawba County and is bordered by the City of Hickory to the west, the City of Newton to the south, and the City of Claremont to the east. Interstate 40 traverses Conover, with access from four major exits (128, 130, 132, and 133). U.S. Route 70, U.S. Route 321, and North Carolina Highway 16 all pass through Conover, making Conover one of the most easily accessible cities in the Charlotte Metro Region.

According to the United States Census Bureau, Conover has a total area of 10.9 square miles (28.3 km^{2}), of which 0.031 square miles (0.08 km^{2}), or 0.27%, is water

== Demographics ==
Historical population
Census	Pop.	Note	%±
1880	150		—
1890	337		124.7%
1900	413		22.6%
1910	421		1.9%
1920	681		61.8%
1930	973		42.9%
1940	1,195		22.8%
1950	1,164		−2.6%
1960	2,281		96.0%
1970	3,355		47.1%
1980	4,245		26.5%
1990	5,465		28.7%
2000	6,604		20.8%
2010	8,165		23.6%
2020	8,421		3.1%
2025 (est.)	8,938	▲	6.1%
U.S. Decennial Census

=== 2020 census ===
Conover racial composition
Race	Number	Percentage
White (non-Hispanic)	5,678	67.43%
Black or African American (non-Hispanic)	721	8.56%
Native American	19	0.23%
Asian	455	5.4%
Pacific Islander	1	0.01%
Other/Mixed	366	4.35%
Hispanic or Latino	1,181	14.02%

As of the 2020 census, Conover had a population of 8,421. The median age was 44.0 years. 20.8% of residents were under the age of 18 and 21.5% of residents were 65 years of age or older. For every 100 females there were 91.3 males, and for every 100 females age 18 and over there were 86.9 males age 18 and over.

98.5% of residents lived in urban areas, while 1.5% lived in rural areas.

There were 3,541 households in Conover, of which 27.7% had children under the age of 18 living in them. Of all households, 43.9% were married-couple households, 17.5% were households with a male householder and no spouse or partner present, and 31.8% were households with a female householder and no spouse or partner present. About 31.7% of all households were made up of individuals and 15.3% had someone living alone who was 65 years of age or older.

There were 2,265 families residing in the city. There were 3,805 housing units, of which 6.9% were vacant. The homeowner vacancy rate was 1.9% and the rental vacancy rate was 6.7%.

=== 2010 census ===
As of the 2010 census there were 8,165 people, 3,368 households, and 2,182 families residing in the city. The population density was 738.1 inhabitants per square mile (285.0/km^{2}). There were 3,654 housing units at an average density of 328.5 per square mile (126.8/km^{2}). The racial makeup of the city was 78.1% White, 9.2% African American, 0.2% Native American, 4.2% Asian, 5.8% from other races, and 2.5% from two or more races. Hispanic or Latino of any race were 12.2% of the population.

There were 3,654 households, out of which 30.1% had children under the age of 18 living with them, 47.1% were married couples living together, 12.2% had a female householder with no husband present, and 35.2% were non-families. 30.6% of all households were made up of individuals, and 13.2% had someone living alone who was 65 years of age or older. The average household size was 2.39 and the average family size was 2.96.

== City services ==
=== Public works ===
The Conover Public Works Department provides Water, Street Construction, Maintenance and Repair, Storm Water Management, Solid Waste and Recycling, Water Treatment, Grounds and Parks and Fleet Maintenance services to the residents of Conover.

=== Fire-rescue ===
The Conover Fire Department provides fire suppression, emergency medical services, hazardous materials (HAZMAT) mitigation, technical rescues, public education, and fire prevention and inspection with 18 full-time and 40 part-time/volunteer firefighters operating out of three fire stations.

=== Law enforcement ===
The Conover Police Department is staffed by 30 full-time officers, 1 code enforcement officer, 5 part-time employees, and 5 volunteer police chaplains.

=== Emergency medical services ===
Emergency medical services for the City of Conover are provided by CCEMS, the Catawba County EMS Agency.

== Transportation ==
Conover is located in the western piedmont area of North Carolina. Conover is located 43 miles (69 km) northwest of Charlotte, 63 miles (101 km) west of Winston-Salem, and 83 miles (134 km) east of Asheville.

Interstate 40 traverses the city along with other major roads including US 70, US 321 and NC 16, making it easy to access the city from any direction.

== Mass transit ==
- Greenway Bus Transportation (main office located in Conover)

== Parks and recreation ==
Conover is home of the Rock Barn Country Club and Spa, a golf club with two championship 18-hole courses and spa that was home to the Greater Hickory Classic at Rock Barn, a PGA Champions Tour Event.

Conover has nine neighborhood parks and one greenway:

- Downtown Park - 1.97 acres (0.80 ha), with gazebo, walking trails and playground equipment.
- Gateway Park - a linear park that provides a pedestrian/bicycle link into downtown.
- Hines Park - located in the ConWest Business Park, the park and its gazebo are mainly used by employees of nearby businesses.
- Hunsucker Park - located in the largest neighborhood in the city, Lecho Park, the park occupies 1.13 acres (0.46 ha) and contains playground equipment.
- 'Majestic Park - located in the southwest quadrant of the city, the park occupies 3.92 acres (1.59 ha) and contains recreation equipment.
- Rowe Park - the smallest of the city's parks, it contains a gazebo, picnic table, and a swing set.
- Travis Park - Located in the northwest quadrant of the city, the park contains benches, a picnic table and recreation equipment.
- Washington/Southwest Park - 2.21 acres (0.89 ha), the park includes a basketball court and baseball field, along with recreation equipment.
- Conover City Park - 6.75 acres (2.73 ha), with a picnic area, playground equipment, walking trails, splash pad and wetlands.
- Lyle Creek Greenway - a 1.5 mile long enhanced surface natural trail that follows Lyle Creek and provides great relaxation and wildlife viewing. This trail consists of both wooded areas and open fields.

== Education ==
The majority of the city is in the Newton-Conover City Schools. Other portions are in the Catawba County Schools school district.

Elementary schools

- Shuford Elementary School (Newton-Conover City Schools)
- South Newton Elementary School (Newton-Conover City Schools)
- North Newton Elementary School (Newton-Conover City Schools)
- Conover School (Newton-Conover City Schools)
- Lyle Creek Elementary School (Catawba County Schools)

St. Stephens Elementary School of Catawba County Schools has a Conover postal address, but is in the Hickory city limits, and not in the Conover city limits.

Middle schools

- Newton-Conover Middle School (Newton-Conover City Schools)

The Newton-Conover City Schools district operates Newton-Conover High School, the comprehensive high school for the entire district, and Discovery High School of Newton-Conover, an alternative high school.

Lyle Creek ES's feeder middle and high schools are River Bend Middle School and Bunker Hill High School. St. Stephens ES's feeder middle and high schools are H.M. Arndt Middle School and St. Stephens High School.

Private schools

- Concordia Christian Day School (K–8)
- Concordia College (1878–1935)

== NASCAR in Conover ==
Conover is home to the transportation office for NASCAR. Conover is also home to Dale Jarrett Inc., and Morgan Shepherd Racing Ventures.

== Notable people ==
- Mark K. Hilton – member of the North Carolina General Assembly from 2001 to 2013
- Tommy Houston – NASCAR Cup Series and Xfinity Series driver
- W. Stine Isenhower – member of the North Carolina House of Representatives from 1986 to 1992
- Dale Jarrett – NASCAR Cup Series champion, three-time Daytona 500 champion, and 2014 NASCAR Hall of Fame inductee
- Glenn Jarrett – NASCAR Cup Series and Xfinity Series driver
- Jason Jarrett – NASCAR Cup Series and Xfinity Series driver
- Ned Jarrett – two-time NASCAR champion and 2011 NASCAR Hall of Fame inductee
- Robert Kearns – bassist who has played with several notable bands
- Morgan Shepherd – NASCAR Cup Series driver and NASCAR team owner
- Chris Washburn – NBA player
