= Huffman House =

Huffman House may refer to:

in the United States (by state then city)

- Dr. George Huffman House, Florence, Arizona, listed on the National Register of Historic Places (NRHP) in Pinal County
- Huffman House (Lancaster, Kentucky), listed on the NRHP in Garrard County
- William Huffman Cobblestone House, Phelps, New York, listed on the NRHP in Ontario County
- George Huffman Farm, Conover, North Carolina, listed on the NRHP in Catawba County
- Warlick-Huffman Farm, Propst Crossroads, North Carolina, listed on the NRHP in Catawba County
- Hanitch-Huffman House, Dayton, Ohio, listed on the NRHP in Dayton
- Huffman House (Newport, Virginia), listed on the NRHP in Craig County
