= Bolick =

Bolick may refer to:

== People with the surname ==
- Robert Bolick, Filipino basketball player
- Clint Bolick (born 1957), co-founder of Institute of Justice, and current Vice President of Litigation at the Goldwater Institute
- Frank Bolick (born 1966), Major League Baseball player
- Harry Bolick (1912–1999), American athlete and sports coach
- Leonard Bolick, American pastor
- Shawnna Bolick (born 1976), American politician
- The Blue Sky Boys, former country duo consisting of Earl & Bill Bolick

== Places ==
- Bolick Historic District, historic district in North Carolina
