= Catawba Valley Community College =

Public college in Hickory, North Carolina, US

- Former names: Catawba Valley Technical Institute; Catawba Valley Technical College
- Type: Public community college
- Established: April 3, 1958
- Parent institution: North Carolina Community College System
- President: Garrett D. Hinshaw
- Undergraduates: 4,500
- Location: Hickory, North Carolina, United States; 35°41′57″N 81°17′15″W
- Nickname: Red Hawks
- Website: www.cvcc.edu

Catawba Valley Community College (CVCC) is a public community college in Hickory, North Carolina. The college, established April 3, 1958, is part of the North Carolina Community College System. The main campus covers 162 acres (0.66 km^{2}) and includes 16 buildings. The college also operates a Cosmetology Center in downtown Newton, the CVCC Alexander Center for Education in Taylorsville, and East Campus, where continuing education and business & industry services are provided. Specialty programs include the Manufacturing Solutions Center, where US manufacturers are provided assistance to increase sales, improve quality and improve efficiency. A 28,000-square-foot (2,600 m^{2}) Regional Simulated Hospital, ValleySim Hospital, opened in 2011. CVCC now has two furniture academies, one in Newton, North Carolina, and one in Taylorsville, North Carolina.

== Early College High Schools ==
Challenger Early College High School is a program on the campus of Catawba Valley Community College that is a collaborative effort between Catawba County Schools, North Carolina New Schools, CVCC, and the Bill and Melinda Gates Foundation. Every year, Challenger Early College High School accepts 100 8th graders out of about 300 applicants from Catawba County Schools, Alexander County Schools, Hickory City Schools, and Newton-Conover City Schools. In 2015, 390 students attended Challenger. They take a four- or five-year curriculum with high school courses and college courses. All students, upon graduation, receive a high school diploma (and usually an associate degree).

Alexander Early College High School is a program on the CVCC Alexander Center Campus of Catawba Valley Community College. Established in 2016 under the Alexander County Schools high school system, students can graduate in four years, with both a high school diploma and an associate degree, in either science or art, or gain credits in a business program offered by the school. Mainly serving students already under the Alexander County Schools system, homeschooled students and others living in the area can also apply. Most students apply and are accepted to the school in their eighth grade year, however, some transfer students have been accepted in later years. Housed in the Applied Technology building, AEC has approximately 230 students, and its current principal is Mary Brown.

== 2011 free speech controversy ==
In October 2011, Catawba Valley Community College suspended student Marc Bechtol for complaining on his Facebook page about a new policy that required students to sign up for a debit card to get their student ID and grant money. CVCC decided that the comments were "disturbing" and a "threat", and used that reasoning to suspend the student. The Foundation for Individual Rights in Education took the side of the student, and he was allowed back in class pending an outcome. Charges were dropped in December 2011.

== See also ==
- Redhawk Publications
