= Muscle Shoals Sound Studio =

Recording studio in Sheffield, Alabama

- U.S. National Register of Historic Places
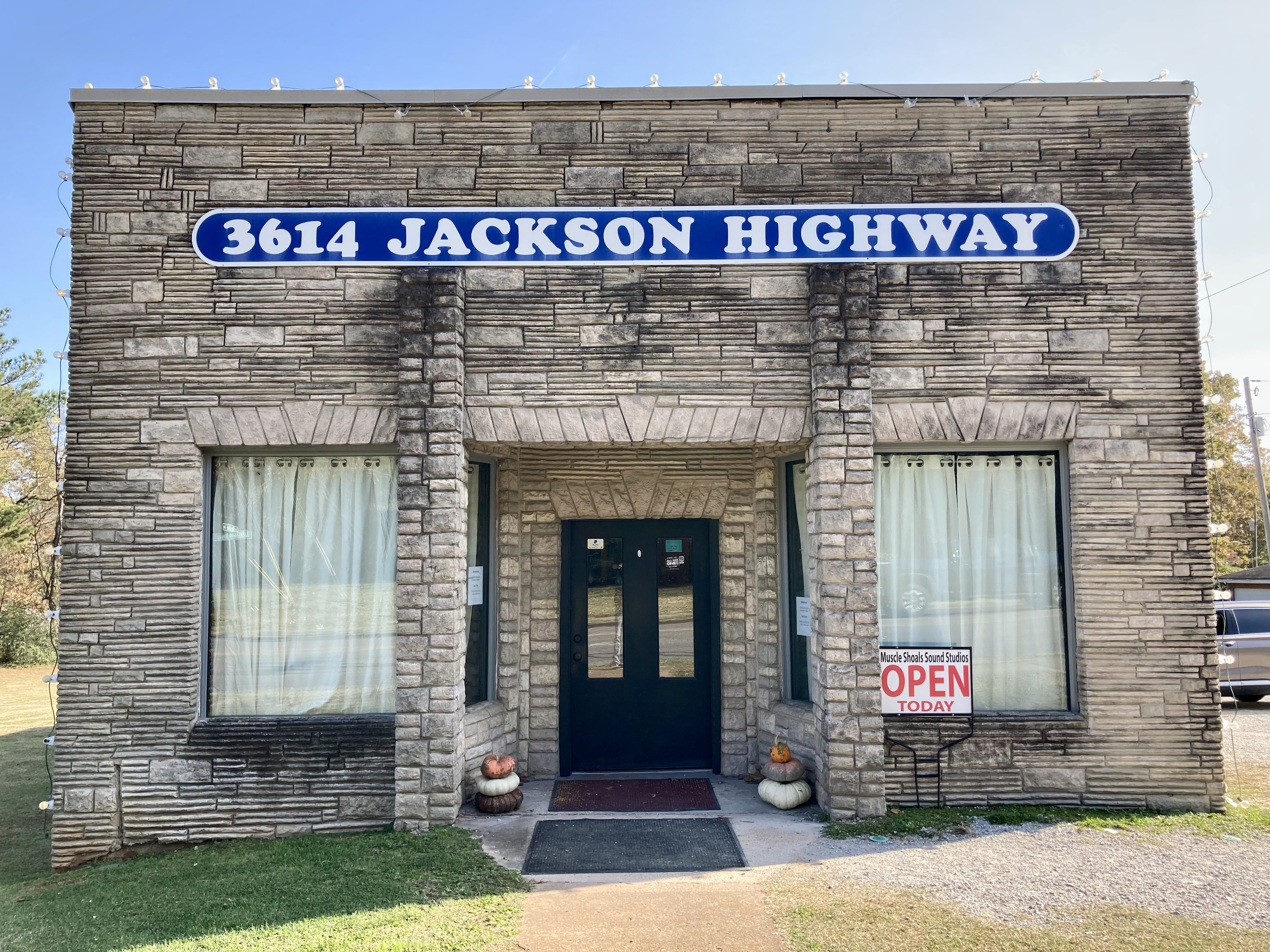
- Original studio at 3614 Jackson Highway, Sheffield
- Location: 3614 Jackson Hwy., Sheffield, Alabama
- Coordinates: 34°46′4″N 87°40′26″W
- Architectural style: Early commercial
- Website: muscleshoalssoundstudio.org
- NRHP reference No.: 06000437
- Added to NRHP: June 2, 2006

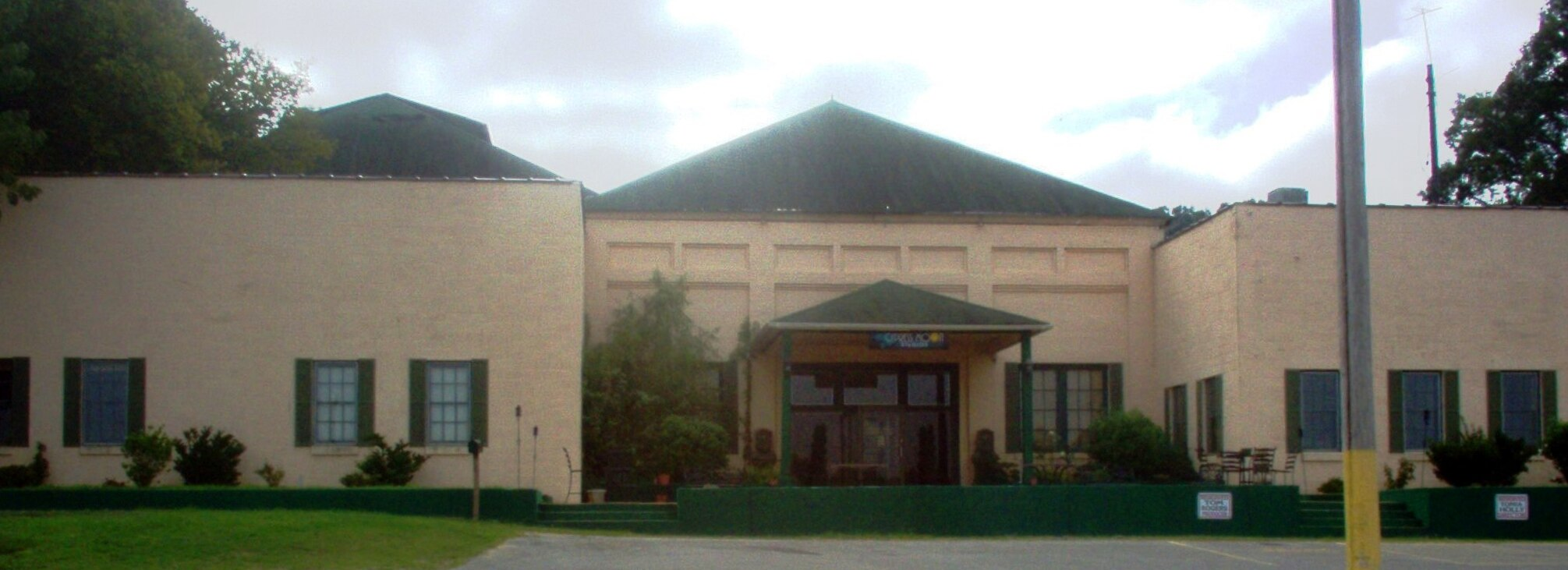
1979–2005 location, 1000 Alabama Avenue in Sheffield, Alabama (34.7700°N 87.7067°W)

Muscle Shoals Sound Studio is an American recording studio in Sheffield, Alabama, formed in 1969 by four session musicians known as the Muscle Shoals Rhythm Section. They had left nearby FAME Studios in Muscle Shoals to create their own recording facility.

They attracted noted artists from across the United States and Great Britain. Over the years, artists who recorded at Muscle Shoals Sound Studio included Wilson Pickett, Aretha Franklin, Etta James, Percy Sledge, the Rolling Stones, Willie Nelson, Duane Allman, Lynyrd Skynyrd, Joe Cocker, Levon Helm, Paul Simon, Bob Seger, Rod Stewart, Cat Stevens, Bob Dylan, Jimmy Cliff, Cher, George Michael, and the Black Keys.

== History ==
=== Founders ===
The four founders of the studio, Barry Beckett, Roger Hawkins, Jimmy Johnson and David Hood, were session musicians at Rick Hall's FAME Studios; they were officially known as the Muscle Shoals Rhythm Section but widely referred to as "The Swampers", who were recognized as having crafted the "Muscle Shoals sound" in conjunction with Hall.

The Muscle Shoals Rhythm Section was the first group of musicians to own a studio and to eventually run their own publishing and production companies. They provided musical backing and arrangements for many recordings, including major hits by Wilson Pickett, Aretha Franklin, and the Staple Singers; a wide range of artists in popular music also recorded hit songs and complete albums at the studio. They had first worked together in 1967 and initially played sessions in New York and Nashville before doing so at FAME. Their initial successes in soul and R&B led to more mainstream rock and pop performers who began coming to record at Muscle Shoals Sound Studios, including the Rolling Stones, Dr. Hook, Millie Jackson, Boz Scaggs, Paul Simon, Bob Seger, Bob Dylan, Duane Allman, Traffic, Glenn Frey, Elton John, Willie Nelson, Elkie Brooks, and Julian Lennon.

=== 3614 Jackson Highway ===
The Muscle Shoals Rhythm Section partnered with producer Jerry Wexler, who provided start-up funding, to found Muscle Shoals Sound Studio at 3614 Jackson Highway in Sheffield. The concrete block building, originally built around 1946, was previously a coffin showroom.

Cher's sixth album was titled 3614 Jackson Highway (1969) and this became the informal name for the studio in 1969.

The first hit to the studio's credit was R. B. Greaves' "Take a Letter Maria". By December 1969, the Rolling Stones were recording at this new location for three days.

=== 1000 Alabama Avenue ===
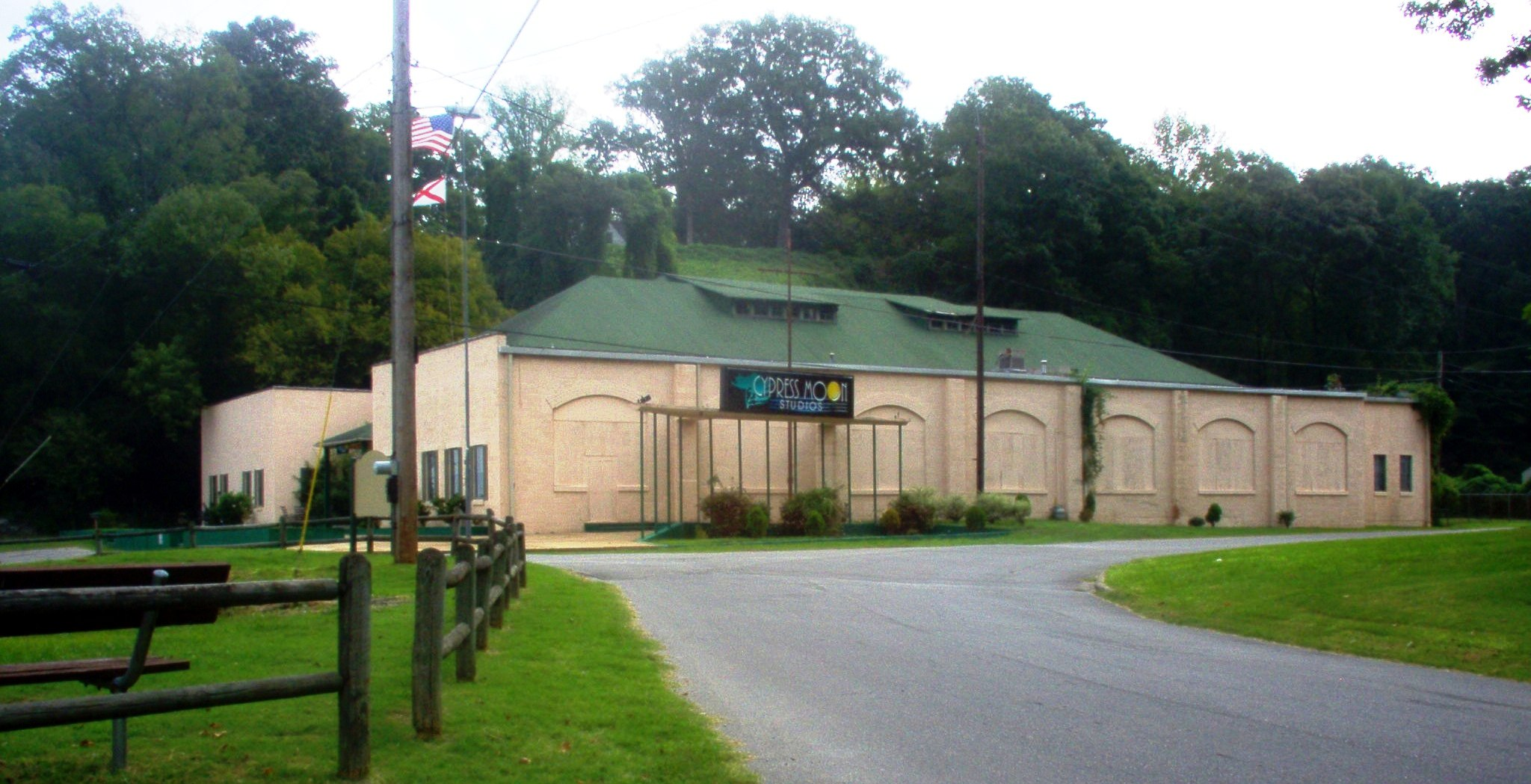
1979–2005 location, now the home of Cypress Moon Studios

The studio at 3614 Jackson Highway closed in April 1979, relocating to a larger updated facility in Sheffield located at 1000 Alabama Avenue. This location operated until it was closed and sold in 1985 to Malaco Records, Tommy Couch's Jackson, Mississippi-based soul and blues label, which also bought the publishing rights held by the Muscle Shoals Sound. Malaco used the Sheffield studios for its own artists, including Johnnie Taylor, Bobby Bland and Little Milton, while continuing to operate its original facility in Jackson. The Rhythm Section, minus Beckett, worked with other studio musicians at Malaco Records and at other studios. In 2005, Couch decided to close the Malaco studio on Alabama Avenue because he was having difficulty competing with more technologically advanced studios.

After the closure of the 1000 Alabama Avenue location, the building was taken over by a movie production company. In 2007, this location housed Cypress Moon Productions and the Cypress Moon Studio with functioning recording equipment, which was operating as a recording studio and was open for tours.

=== Recent history ===
Although it was no longer a working studio in 2009 and 2010, the Jackson Highway location was rented for recording some or all of two Grammy-nominated albums. Band of Horses's third CD, Infinite Arms, recorded in part at that studio, was nominated for a Grammy Award in the category Best Alternative Album.

Ten tracks of Black Keys's sixth album, Brothers, were also recorded at 3614 Jackson Highway. The album was nominated for a 2011 Grammy Award for Best Alternative Music Album. Two songs from the album, "Tighten Up" and "Black Mud", were nominated for Grammys: "Tighten Up" for Best Rock Performance by a Duo or Group with Vocal and Best Rock Song and "Black Mud" for Best Rock Instrumental Performance. Rolling Stone magazine placed the album at number-2 on its list of the Best Albums of 2010 and "Everlasting Light" at number 11 on its list of the Best Singles of 2010. The album was also featured on Spin magazine's Top 40 Albums of 2010.

Chris Stapleton recorded his Grammy winning single, "Cold" at Muscle Shoals Sound Studio in December 2018 and received the Grammy in 2022 thus making the studio one that produces Grammy winning hit records once again.

=== Restoration and reopening ===
The original studio building on Jackson Highway, which had become an audio visual retailer and then an appliance store until 1999, changed ownership, the subsequent owner completing some renovations and retaining the old recording equipment, allowing for tours of the property. The building was listed on the National Register of Historic Places in June 2006, recognized in the area of performing arts.

In 2013, the documentary Muscle Shoals raised public interest in a major restoration of the studio, and in June that year, the owner sold the property (without the historic recording equipment) to the Muscle Shoals Music Foundation, an organization that had been formed earlier that year with the goal of establishing a music museum in the historic building. A large grant from Beats Electronics provided an essential $1 million. The state tourism director said that the 2013 Muscle Shoals film had significant influence. "The financial support from Beats is a direct result of their film." Additional donations were made by other groups and individuals.

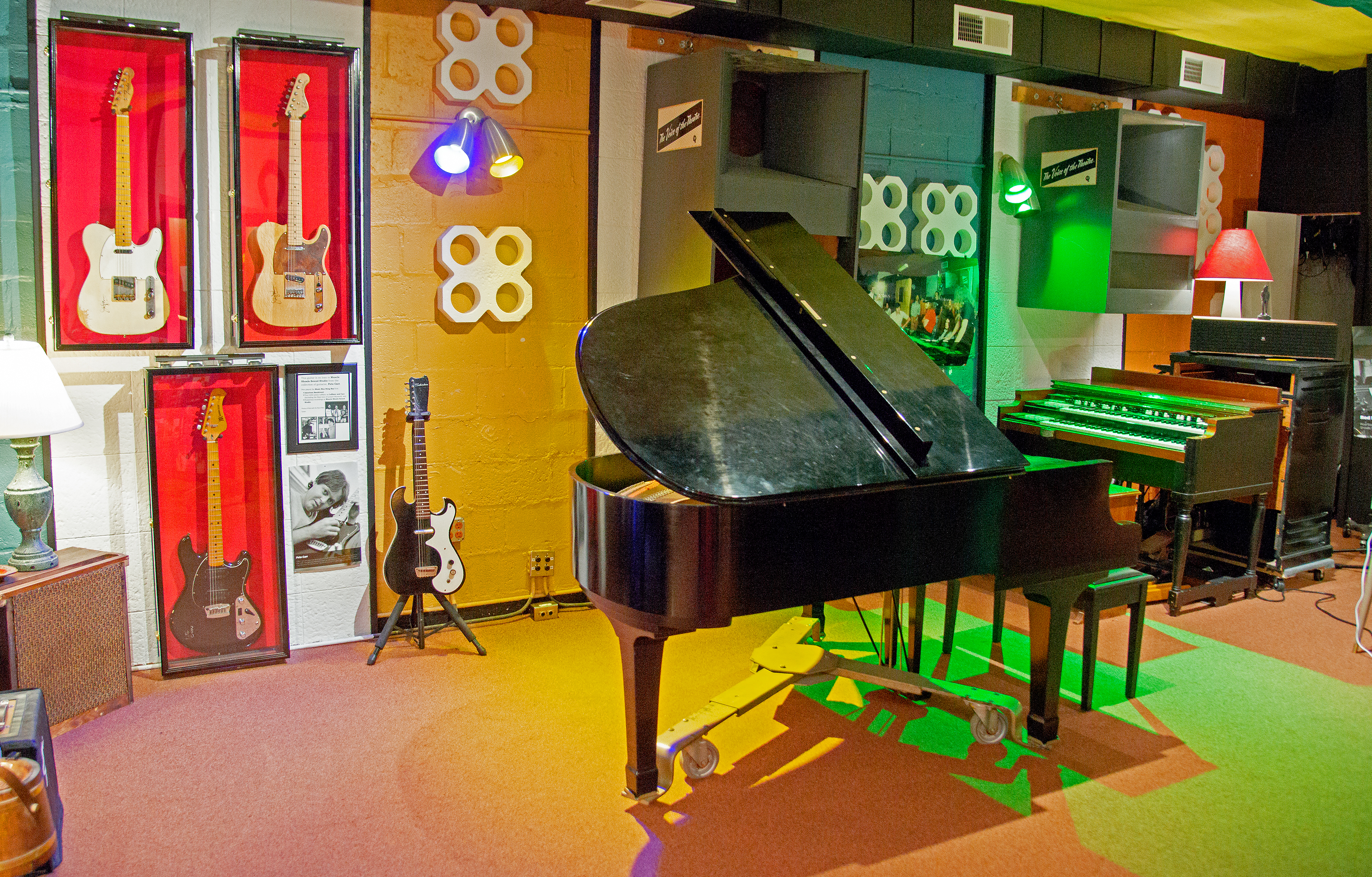
Studio, main area in 2025

The building closed when major restoration work began in September 2015, and reopened as a finished tourist attraction operated by the Muscle Shoals Music Foundation on January 9, 2017. The interior is reminiscent of the 1970s, with relevant recording equipment and paraphernalia. According to a journalist who was a recent visitor, the restored studio is impressive: "Muscle Shoals Sound's interior appears much as it did in its prime. ... Some guitars and amps. A Hammond organ, Wurlitzer electric piano and black baby grand. The control room with recording console and analog tape machine ... There are isolation booths, for vocals, percussion and such..."

The Alabama Tourism Department named Muscle Shoals Sound Studio as the state's top attraction in 2017, even before the Jackson Highway studio reopened. Over 62,000 people from 50 countries and every state in the U.S. have visited since it opened for tours again in 2013.

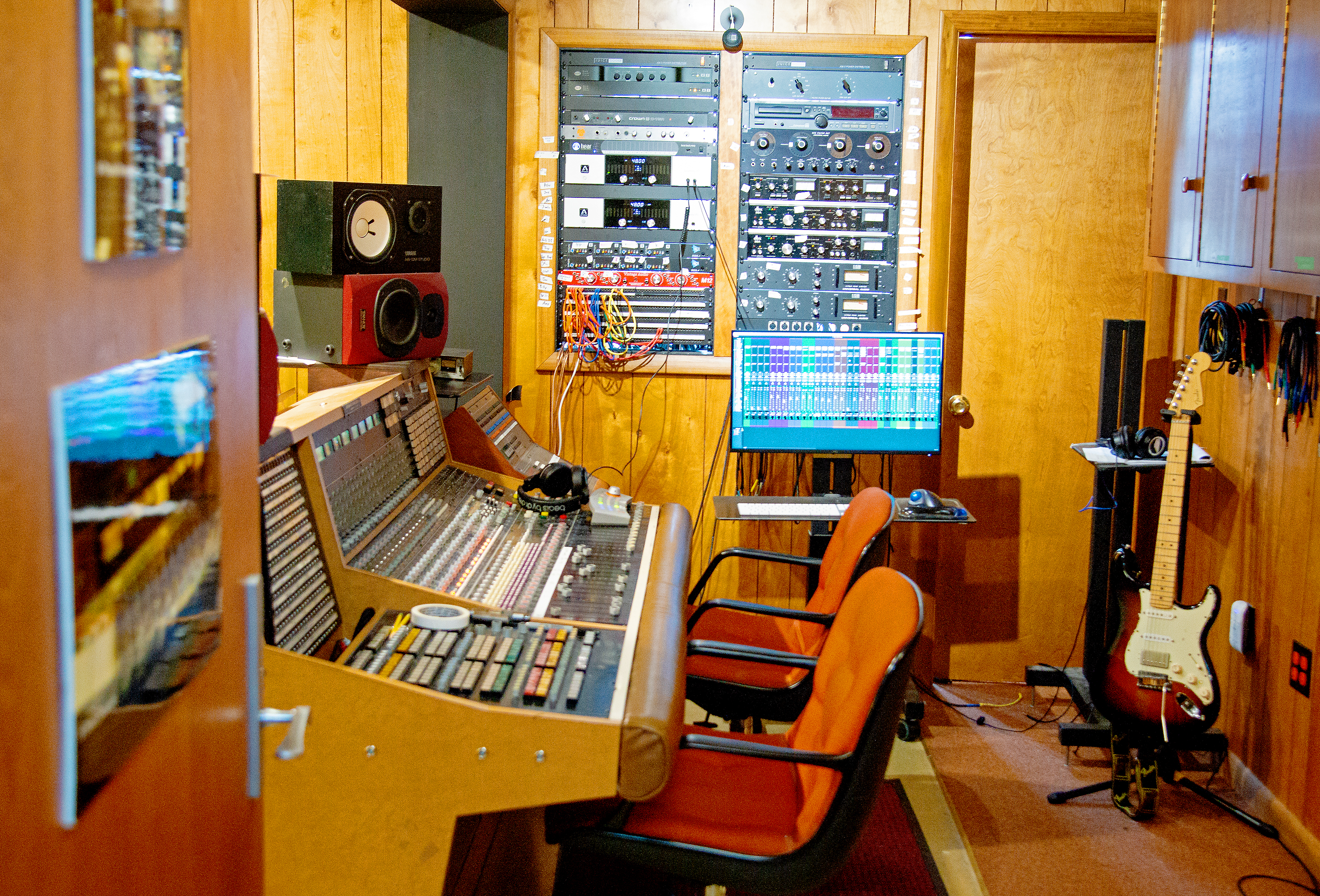
Recording booth in 2025

The studio is a working recording studio at night. Dan Auerbach of the Black Keys recorded a solo project in March 2017. Grammy winning producer Dave Cobb of Nashville recorded rockers Rival Sons in April 2017. Actor Kiefer Sutherland recorded with Swamper David Hood in May 2017. In 2018, Bishop Gunn released the first recording from the studio after the restoration, "Shine" from their album, Natchez. Donnie Fritts released tunes recorded at the studio on his June album, in conjunction with John Paul White and Single Lock Records.

== Documentary ==
Filmmaker Greg Camalier premiered his documentary film Muscle Shoals at the Sundance Film Festival in January 2013. It is about Muscle Shoals sound, and features Rick Hall, FAME Studios, and the Muscle Shoals Rhythm Section (Swampers) who had founded the Muscle Shoals Sound Studios. The film includes interviews with Percy Sledge, Wilson Pickett, Aretha Franklin, Etta James, Mick Jagger, Keith Richards, Steve Winwood, Bono, Alicia Keys and many others.

== Selected recordings ==
Title	Artist	Date	US Pop chart	US R&B chart	Notes
3614 Jackson Highway	Cher	1969			
Boz Scaggs	Boz Scaggs	1969			features Duane Allman playing guitar on several cuts
"Take a Letter, Maria"	R. B. Greaves	1969, August 19,	No. 2	No. 10	
Muscle Shoals Nitty Gritty	Herbie Mann	(Released 1970)			
"Brown Sugar"	The Rolling Stones	December 2–4, 1969 (Released 1971)	No. 1		
"Wild Horses"	The Rolling Stones	December 2–4, 1969 (Released 1971)	No. 28		
"Starting All Over Again"	Mel & Tim	1972, May	No. 19	No. 4	
"I'll Take You There"	Staple Singers	1972	No. 1	No. 1	
"Kodachrome"	Paul Simon	1973	No. 2		
"Loves Me Like a Rock"	Paul Simon	1973	No. 2		
One More River to Cross	Canned Heat	1973			
Don't Your Plums Look Mellow Hanging on Your Tree	Big Joe Williams	1974			Willlams' last recordings
Atlantic Crossing	Rod Stewart	1974–1975 (released 1975)			"Sailing" was a number one hit in the UK Singles Chart
Breakaway	Art Garfunkel	1975			
"Katmandu"	Bob Seger	1975	No. 43		
No Reservations	Blackfoot	1975			
Flyin' High	Blackfoot	1976			
"Night Moves"	Bob Seger	1976	No. 8		
"Mainstreet"	Bob Seger	1976	No. 24 (in 1977)		
Izitso	Cat Stevens	1976	No. 7 (in 1977)		
"Torn Between Two Lovers"	Mary MacGregor	1976	No. 1 (in 1977)		
Street Survivors	Lynyrd Skynyrd	1977			
"Old Time Rock and Roll"	Bob Seger	1978	No. 28 (in 1979)		ranked number two on the Amusement & Music Operators Association's survey of the Top 40 Jukebox Singles of All Time in 1996
Skynyrd's First: The Complete Muscle Shoals Album	Lynyrd Skynyrd	1971–1972 (Released 1978)			
"Gotta Serve Somebody"	Bob Dylan	1979	No. 24		1980 Grammy winner
Pleasure and Pain	Dr. Hook	1978	No. 66		
Sharing The Night Together	Dr. Hook	1978	No. 6		
When You're In Love With A Beautiful Woman	Dr. Hook	1979	No. 6		
Sometimes You Win	Dr. Hook	1979	No. 71		
Better Love Next Time	Dr. Hook	1979	No. 12		
Sexy Eyes	Dr. Hook	1980	No. 5		
Take What You Find	Helen Reddy	1979 (released 1980)			
Valotte	Julian Lennon	1984	No. 9		
"Careless Whisper"	George Michael	1983			Not the hit version, this was released as a b-side on a UK special 12" and on the Japanese 12"
Brother	Cry of Love	1993			Three of the album's songs reached the top twenty of the Billboard Album Rock Tracks chart
Brothers	Black Keys	2009 (Released 2010)			2011 Grammy Award winner

== See also ==
- List of music museums
- Category:Albums recorded at Muscle Shoals Sound Studio
- National Register of Historic Places listings in Colbert County, Alabama
