= Challenger Early College High School =

American public school in North Carolina

Challenger High School

Location
- 2550 Highway 70 SE; Hickory, North Carolina 28602; United States
- 35°41′57″N 81°17′15″W

Information
- School type: Public
- Motto: Building College-Ready Lifelong Learners
- Established: 2005 (21 years ago)
- Status: Open
- School district: Catawba County Schools
- CEEB code: 340612
- NCES School ID: 370069002753
- Principal: Dr. Rene Spry
- Teaching staff: 11.22 (FTE)
- Grades: 9–12
- Enrollment: 376 (2025-2026)
- Student to teacher ratio: 33.51
- Colors: Purple and silver
- Athletics conference: Western Piedmont Athletic Conference
- Mascot: Phoenix
- Nickname: Firebirds
- Accreditation: AdvancED
- USNWR ranking: 4,998
- College Liaison: Meredith Lerm
- Website: challenger.catawbaschools.net

Challenger Early College High School is a public secondary school in Hickory, North Carolina, United States on the campus of Catawba Valley Community College. Challenger Early College High School is ranked the top high school in Catawba County Schools.

== History ==
Challenger Early College High School was established in August 2005 as a joint project of the Catawba Valley Education Consortium, including Catawba County Schools, Alexander County Schools, Hickory City Schools, Newton-Conover City Schools, and Catawba Valley Community College.

== Applying to Challenger ==
At the end of 8th grade, approximately 300 students from Catawba County and Alexander County apply to Challenger Early College High School. From the pool of students who apply, 100 are accepted, with consideration of the level of education attained by their parents, family socioeconomic status, ethnicity, population at national and state universities, single-parent home status, and teacher recommendations for success in an accelerated program.

== Learning programs ==
In an effort to fulfill the vision of Challenger Early College High School, multiple programs are incorporated into the learning environment to ensure that students are prepared for college, careers, and life in the 21st century.

=== NCNSP Common Instructional Framework ===
Challenger Early College High School follows the NCNSP Common Instructional Framework, which emphasizes skills such as collaborative group work, classroom talk, scaffolding, questioning, literacy groups, and the writing process.

== Extracurricular activities ==
=== Performing arts ===
Challenger Early College High School offers multiple performing arts programs.

- Concert Band
- Chorus
- Honors Chorus
- Honors Band
- Drama Club
- Modern Raza
- Traditional Raza
- Kpop Dance
- Hmong Dance

=== Sports ===
Multiple sports are carried out at Challenger Early College High School throughout the school year.

==== Fall sports ====
- Men's Varsity Soccer
- Varsity Volleyball
- Jr. Varsity Volleyball

==== Winter sports ====
- Varsity Men's Basketball
- Varsity Women's Basketball
- Varsity Cheerleading

==== Spring sports ====
- Women's Varsity Soccer

=== Clubs ===
- Debate Club
- Anime Club
- STEM Club
- Interact Club
- First Gen Flyers Club
- Beta Club
- TV Production
- Yearbook Committee
- Student Government Association (SGA)
- Journalism Club
- American Sign Language (ASL) Club
- National Association for the Advancement of Colored People (NAACP)
- Entrepreneurship Club
- Quiz Bowl Club
- Healthcare Club
- Fashion Club
- Firebird Pantry
- Hearts for Hunger
- Fellowship of Christian Students (FCS)
- Art Club
- Korean Culture Club
- SkillsUSA
- Gender-Sexuality Alliance (GSA)
- Battle of the Books
- Esports
- Juntos (4-H)

== Graduation requirements ==
Besides the normal class requirements, Challenger Early College High School students are also expected to present an ePortfolio that showcases their high-school learning career and the skills they developed to a panel of community evaluators. As a parent-involvement program, parents are required to volunteer four hours every year.
