= Brother (Cry of Love album) =

Studio album by Cry of Love
- Released: 1993
- Recorded: November 1992
- Studio: Muscle Shoals
- Genre: Rock
- Label: Columbia
- Producer: John Custer

Cry of Love chronology
Brother (1993)	Diamonds & Debris (1997)

Brother is the debut album by the American rock band Cry of Love, released in 1993. "Peace Pipe" peaked at No. 1 on Billboard's Album Rock Tracks chart; two other singles made the chart's top twenty. "Bad Thing" peaked at No. 60 on the UK Singles Chart. The album sold more than 200,000 copies. Cry of Love supported Brother by opening for Robert Plant, Aerosmith, and ZZ Top on separate North American tours.

== Production ==
The album was produced by John Custer at Muscle Shoals Sound Studio, and was recorded and mixed in four weeks. The majority of the album's songs were written by Cry of Love's guitar player, Audley Freed. "Peace Pipe" is about the United States breaking its treaties with Native Americans.

== Critical reception ==
Professional ratings
Review scores
Source	Rating
AllMusic	4/5 stars
The Charlotte Observer	3.5/4 stars
The Encyclopedia of Popular Music	3/5 stars
MusicHound Rock: The Essential Album Guide	3/5 stars

The Washington Post called the album "the usual post-Allmans compendium of blues-rock swagger, soul-man vocals and bad-love and on-the-road songs." The Morning Call wrote that the songs "have a raw, naked sound built around the tough, direct playing of guitarist Audley Freed, bassist Robert Kearns and drummer Jason Peterson, plus [Kelly] Holland's soulfully sandpapered singing." The Boston Herald praised the "distinct and agreeable '60s and '70s blues-rock vibe."

The Journal Star determined that "the straight-ahead rock, with a blues undercurrent, brings to mind basement jam sessions or a carful of friends singing to a blaring stereo." The Los Angeles Daily News labeled it "unadorned, sparsely produced Stratocaster-driven rock." The Modesto Bee concluded that Brother "contains straight-ahead rock that's raw and unfiltered, catching a sound that's since been urbanized and called 'grunge.'" The Fort Worth Star-Telegram considered the band "awfully derivative—sometimes annoyingly so," writing that "Bad Thing" "is nothing more than Grand Funk's 'Some Kind of Wonderful' with a little Bad Co. mixed in."

AllMusic deemed the album "a near-perfect fusion of classic British hard-rock influences (read Free) and Southern rock sensibility, bringing a refreshing honesty to the dreary radio landscape of the early '90s."

== Track listing ==
All tracks written by Audley Freed, except where noted.

1. "Highway Jones" (Freed, K. Holland)
2. "Pretty as You Please"
3. "Bad Thing" (Holland, Freed, J. Custer)
4. "Too Cold in the Winter" (Holland, Freed)
5. "Hand Me Down"
6. "Gotta Love Me" (Freed, Holland, Custer)
7. "Carnival"
8. "Drive It Home" (Freed, Holland, Custer)
9. "Peace Pipe" (Freed, Holland)
10. "Saving Grace"

== Personnel ==
From Columbia's CK 53404 CD liner notes

- Audley Freed – guitars
- Kelly Holland – vocals, percussion, piano on "Carnival"
- Robert Kearns – bass
- Jason Patterson – drums
- John Custer – piano on "Bad Thing"
- Pepper Keenan – tremolo guitar on "Bad Thing"
- Kelly, Jason, Robert, Audley, Josh, John, Kent – hand claps on "Bad Thing"
