= Fred T. Foard High School =

American public school in North Carolina

Location
- 3407 Plateau Road; Newton, North Carolina 28658; United States; 35°37′01″N 81°22′17″W

Information
- Type: Public
- Established: 1953 (73 years ago)
- School district: Catawba County Schools
- CEEB code: 342905
- Principal: Stephen Westmoreland
- Faculty: 113
- Teaching staff: 42.60 (FTE)
- Grades: 9–12
- Enrollment: 930 (2024-2025)
- Student to teacher ratio: 21.83
- Colors: Columbia blue and white
- Athletics: NCHSAA 4A
- Athletics conference: Western Foothills 4A/5A
- Mascot: Tigers
- Website: foard.catawbaschools.net

Fred T. Foard High School is a public high school located in the community of Propst Crossroads, ten miles (16 km) west of Newton, North Carolina, United States. The school is part of the Catawba County Schools system. Foard has been designated a school of distinction by the state of North Carolina for academic progress. The school opened in 1953 and was named after Dr. Fred T. Foard, a medical doctor in the area.

== History ==
Land was purchased for building a new high school on October 10, 1950. On January 2, 1951, the school board voted to name the school after Dr. Fred Theopheolus Foard (1855–1933), a community physician and member of the Catawba County Board of Education from 1923 to 1931. Construction began on the high school on June 4, 1951, and opened to students in 1953.

== Athletics ==
Fred T. Foard is a member of the North Carolina High School Athletic Association (NCHSAA) and are classified as a 4A school. The school is a part of the Western Foothills 4A/5A Conference. Fred T. Foard's school colors are columbia blue and white, with the athletic department also using navy blue to accent the main colors. The school team name is the Tigers. Sports at Fred T. Foard include:

- Baseball
- Basketball
- Competition Cheerleading
- Cross Country
- Football
- Golf
- Marching Band
- Soccer
- Softball
- Swimming
- Tennis
- Track & Field
- Volleyball
- Wrestling

== Notable alumni ==
- Matt DiBenedetto, NASCAR Cup Series driver
- Jon Reep, actor and comedian
