= Newton Downtown Historic District =

Newton Downtown Historic District may refer to:

- Newton Downtown Historic District (Newton, Iowa)
- Newton Downtown Historic District (Newton, North Carolina)
