= Brandon Johnson (defensive back) =

American football player (born 2003)

Profile
- Position: Cornerback

Personal information
- Born: March 25, 2003 (age 23)
- Listed height: 5 ft 10 in (1.78 m)
- Listed weight: 185 lb (84 kg)

Career information
- High school: Newton-Conover (Newton, North Carolina)
- College: Duke (2021–2023); Oregon (2024)
- NFL draft: 2025: undrafted

Career history
- Philadelphia Eagles (2025); Seattle Seahawks (2026)*; Tampa Bay Buccaneers (2026)*
- * Offseason or practice squad member only

Career NFL statistics as of 2025
- Tackles: 3
- Pass deflections: 1
- Stats at Pro Football Reference

Brandon Johnson (born March 25, 2003) is an American professional football cornerback. He played college football for the Duke Blue Devils and Oregon Ducks.

== Early life and college career ==
Johnson was born on March 25, 2003, and grew up in Newton, North Carolina. Both of his parents were athletes at Lenoir–Rhyne University. He attended Newton-Conover High School where he competed in football and track and field, winning the regional championship in the 100 metres while being an all-conference and all-state performer in football. A defensive back in football, Johnson helped his school to a state playoff appearance as a senior after posting 44 tackles and three interceptions. He was ranked a three-star recruit and committed to play college football for the Duke Blue Devils.

As a true freshman at Duke in 2021, Johnson tallied 17 tackles and recovered a fumble. He then started all 13 games in 2022 and posted 55 tackles, 7.5 tackles for loss (TFLs), 5.5 sacks and two interceptions, earning honorable mention All-Atlantic Coast Conference (ACC) honors. Johnson was given Duke's 2022 Cutcliffe Family Award as the team's most improved player. He repeated as an honorable mention All-ACC selection in 2023, when he was named Duke's defensive skill player of the year after recording 56 tackles, 8.5 TFLs, two sacks and four pass breakups. Johnson transferred to the Oregon Ducks in 2024 and was used as their fifth defensive back, known as the STAR position to the team. He recorded 45 tackles, 4.5 TFLs and an interception while starting eight games for the Ducks.

== Professional career ==
Pre-draft measurables
Height	Weight	Arm length	Hand span	Wingspan	40-yard dash	10-yard split	20-yard split	20-yard shuttle	Three-cone drill	Vertical jump	Broad jump	Bench press
5 ft 9 1/8 in (1.76 m)	179 lb (81 kg)	30 in (0.76 m)	8 in (0.20 m)	5 ft 11 7/8 in (1.83 m)	4.40 s	1.56 s	2.52 s	4.21 s	6.94 s	35.5 in (0.90 m)	10 ft 2 in (3.10 m)	11 reps
All values from Pro Day

=== Philadelphia Eagles ===
After going unselected in the 2025 NFL draft, Johnson signed with the Philadelphia Eagles as an undrafted free agent. He was waived on August 26, 2025, at the final roster cuts, then re-signed to the practice squad the following day. He was elevated to the active roster for the team's Week 16 game against the Washington Commanders and made his NFL debut in the game, posting a tackle.

Johnson signed a reserve/future contract with Philadelphia on January 12, 2026. On June 16, Johnson was waived by the Eagles.

=== Seattle Seahawks ===
On July 21, 2026, Johnson was signed by the Seattle Seahawks. He was waived with an injury settlement on August 14.

=== Tampa Bay Buccaneers ===
On October 6, 2026, Johnson signed with the Tampa Bay Buccaneers practice squad. On November 16, he was released.
