= Newton-Conover High School =

American public school in North Carolina

Location
- 338 West 15th Street; Newton, North Carolina 28658; United States; 35°40′40″N 81°13′29″W

Information
- Type: Public
- School district: Newton-Conover City Schools
- Superintendent: Aron Gabriel
- CEEB code: 342910
- Principal: Chris Penley
- Staff: 46.73 (FTE)
- Grades: 9–12
- Enrollment: 749 (2023–2024)
- Student to teacher ratio: 16.03
- Colors: Red and white
- Athletics: NCHSAA 4A
- Athletics conference: Western Foothills 4A/5A
- Team name: Red Devils
- Website: nhs.newton-conover.org

Newton-Conover High School (NCHS) is a public high school located in Newton, North Carolina, and is the one of two secondary schools in Newton-Conover City Schools system, alongside Discovery High School.

The boundary of the school district includes the majorities of Newton and Conover.

== Athletics ==
Newton-Conover is a member of the North Carolina High School Athletic Association (NCHSAA) and are classified as a 4A school. The school is a part of the Western Foothills 4A/5A Conference. Newton-Conover's colors are red and white, and its team name is the Red Devils. Sports at Newton-Conover include:

- Baseball
- Basketball
- Cheerleading
- Cross Country
- Football
- Golf
- Marching Band
- Soccer
- Softball
- Swimming
- Tennis
- Track & Field
- Volleyball
- Wrestling

== Notable people ==
=== Alumni ===
- Chaz Beasley, North Carolina House of Representatives member
- W. Stine Isenhower, North Carolina House of Representatives member
- Dale Jarrett, NASCAR Cup Series driver and 1999 NASCAR Cup Series champion
- Brandon Johnson, NFL defensive back
- Robert Kearns, bass player for Lynyrd Skynyrd and Sheryl Crow
- Brock Long, former director of FEMA
- Andy Petree, vice president of Richard Childress Racing and NASCAR crew chief
- Jerry Punch, auto racing and college football commentator
- Dennis Setzer, NASCAR driver

=== Faculty ===
- Andrea Stinson, former WNBA player and NC State Hall of Fame recipient
