= Catawba County Courthouse =

- U.S. National Register of Historic Places
- U.S. Historic district – Contributing property
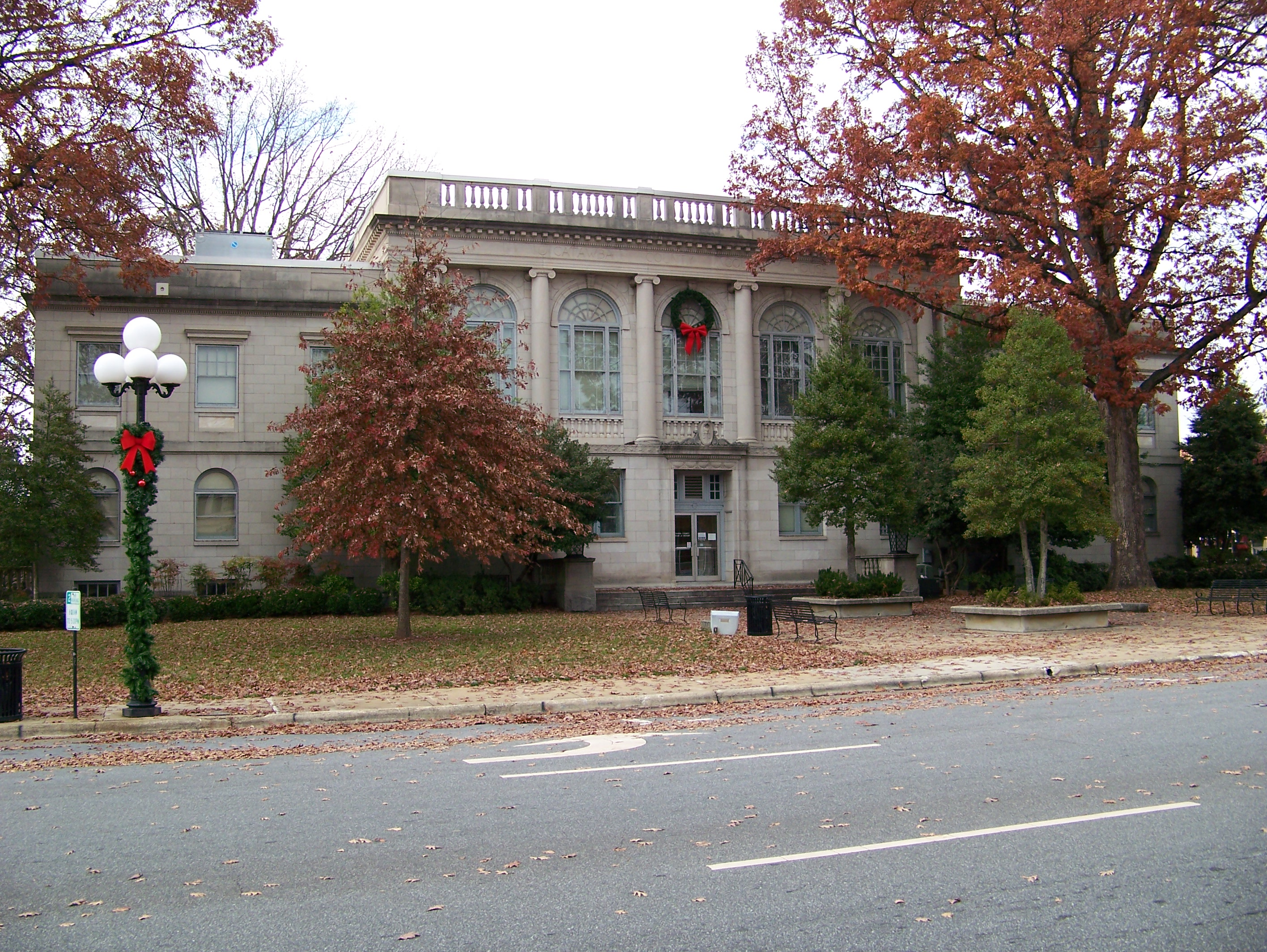

- Location within North Carolina Location within the United States
- Location: S. Main, W.A, S. College, and W. 1st Sts., Newton, North Carolina
- Coordinates: 35°39′47″N 81°13′19″W
- Area: less than one acre
- Built: 1924
- Built by: Stout, J.J.
- Architect: Rogers, Willard G.
- Architectural style: Renaissance
- MPS: North Carolina County Courthouses TR
- NRHP reference No.: 79001690
- Added to NRHP: May 10, 1979

Catawba County Courthouse is a historic courthouse building located at Newton, Catawba County, North Carolina. It was built in 1924, and is a two-story, Renaissance Revival style granite veneered structure. It consists of a two-story main block flanked by slightly recessed two-story wings.

It was listed on the National Register of Historic Places in 1979. It is located in the Newton Downtown Historic District.

Now home to the Catawba County Museum of History, the Courthouse was designed by Willard G. Rogers of Charlotte and built by J. J. Stout for $250,000.
