= Bishop Gunn =

American Americana rock band

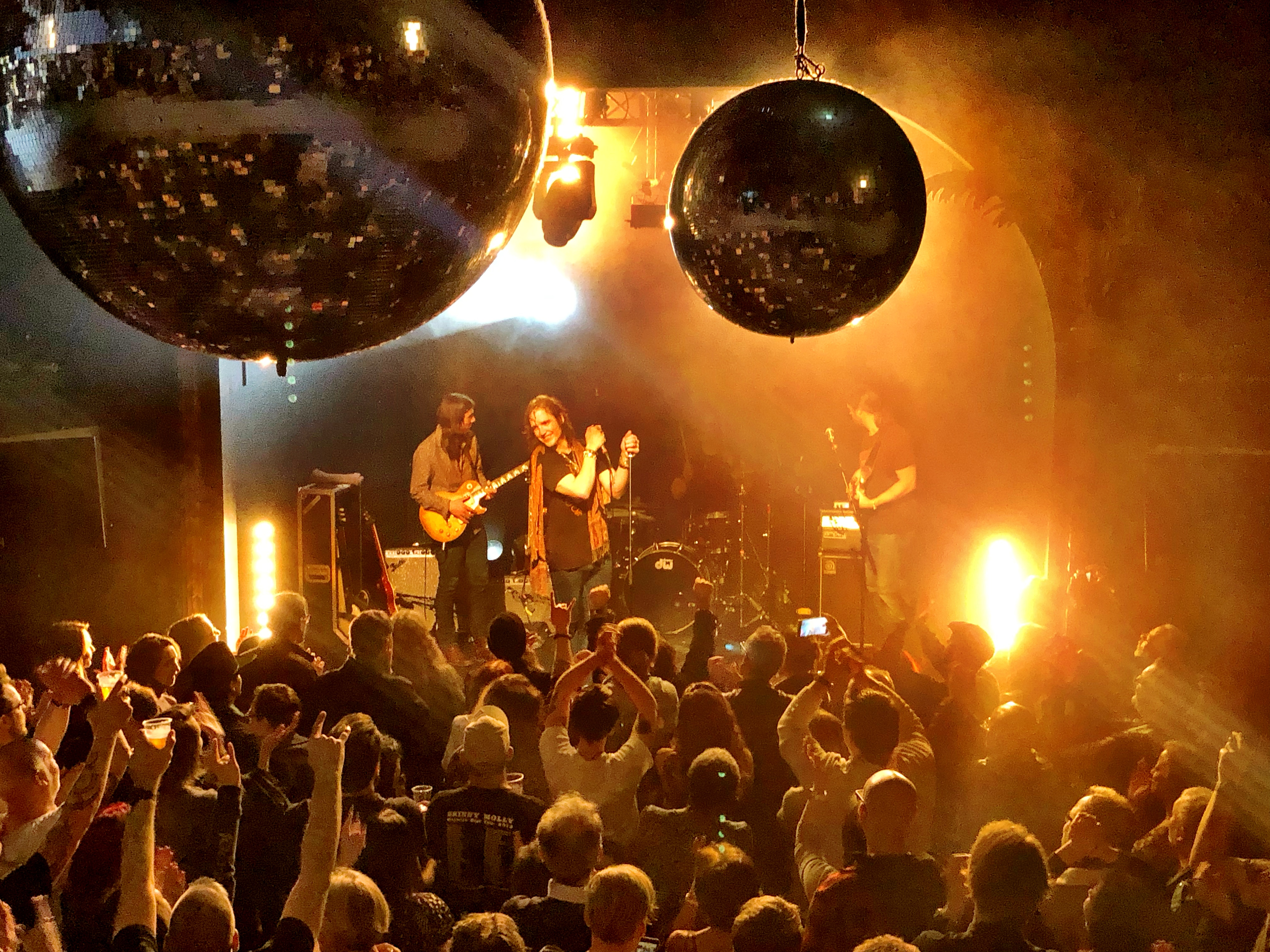
- Bishop Gunn, March 2019 in Paris

Background information
- Origin: Natchez, Mississippi
- Genres: country, blues rock, rock and roll, Americana
- Years active: 2016 – 2020 (hiatus)
- Labels: Farm2Turntable
- Members: Travis McCready; Burne Sharpe; Hudson Laird; Ben Lewis; Drew Smithers
- Website: www.bishopgunn.com

Bishop Gunn was a 4-piece blues Americana rock and roll country band from Natchez, Mississippi. It consisted of Travis McCready, Ben Lewis, Burne Sharpe, and Drew Smithers. Bishop Gunn was influenced by artists such as Wilson Pickett, Lynyrd Skynyrd and Soundgarden. The band was named after a tombstone they saw in Natchez, that was over the resting place of the sixth Bishop of Natchez, John Edward Gunn. The band suspended activity February 20, 2020.

== History ==
Frontman Travis McCready left his blue-collar job working as a welder in a steel mill to pursue a career in music full-time. Drummer Burne Sharpe was searching for a singer to perform with for a festival date, so they met and performed together at Great Mississippi River Balloon Race in 2014. The band was joined by former marine Ben Lewis on bass, then the Bishop Gunn line-up was completed in 2017 when they met guitarist Drew working in a guitar shop in Nashville.

== Music career ==
Bishop Gunn recorded their first EP in Leipers Fork at producer Casey Wasner’s studio, The Purple House, and it was self-released on their own label Farm2Turntable in February 2016. The EP tracks included: "Let the People Know", "Eye of a Hurricane", "Have Your Way With Me", "Bank of the River" and "Riders". The band played together regularly at Smoot's Grocery in Natchez and played throughout Mississippi, Tennessee and Louisiana in 2017 including shows in autumn of that year supporting Lynyrd Skynyrd.

Bishop Gunn worked on a new album in 2017 recording with new guitarist Drew Smithers at Muscle Shoals Sound, The Purple House and Fame Studios. They released their debut full-length album titled Natchez named after their hometown on May 4, 2018.

Bishop Gunn played a SXSW showcase in March 2018, then toured with The Marcus King band, Blackberry Smoke, Whiskey Myers and played two cruises on cruise ships with Kid Rock.

In May 2018 the band launched their first "Bishop Gunn Crawfish Boil" (BGCB) festival in Natchez, Mississippi. The event sold around 4000 tickets and took place in Bluff Park, Natchez.

The band released their first single, "Shine", from their new album Natchez in May 2018 to coincide with the festival. Directed by Tyler Barksdale, the video, set in Natchez features people in different jobs and positions working in the city, from the Natchez Brewery to the steel mill where Travis McCready once worked. The song is also featured on comedian Theo Von's podcast, "This Past Weekend".

The band were included in Rolling Stone magazine's "10 New Country Artists You Need to Know: May 2018" along with The Felice Brothers and Maren Morris.

The band released a second single from Natchez titled "Alabama" in October 2018 together with a video that featured comedian and broadcaster Theo Von. The story of the recording of the track "Alabama" is that Bishop Gunn were heading to the recently reopened Fame Studios in Muscle Shoals to record "Alabama" when they received a phone call telling them that Rick Hall, the studio's owner for more than 50 years, had died. At the urging of Hall's son, Rodney, Bishop Gunn continued driving to Fame, where they recorded "Alabama" with help from a number of local musicians, including rapper GMane who later starred in the music video. The video was produced and directed again by Nashville director Tyler Barksdale and features an eerie baptism scene replete with snakes and Pentecostal worship. The video was part of a series of videos that tell a story inspired on the song.

In 2019 the band released a video for Makin' It from the album 'Natchez', directed once again by Tyler Barksdale. The song, about the death of Travis McCready's brother, was featured in Rolling Stone magazine's top 10 country and Americana songs of February 2019. The band also won the Classic Rock magazine poll with the song in the same month.

The band embarked on their first European tour February 2019 headlining shows from Dublin, to Cologne, including their first London show. The band also supported The Struts in Paris, then joined Slash for a run of European dates.

On February 20th, 2020, the band announced via Facebook that "Bishop Gunn is suspending all future activity including tour dates and new music releases." The band stated the reason was "internal issues."

== Discography ==
- Bishop Gunn EP (2016)

=== Studio albums ===
- Natchez (2018)
- Gypsy Cadillac (2021)

== Members ==
- Travis McCready - Vocals/Guitars/Harmonica
- Drew Smithers - Lead guitar
- Hudson Laird - Lead guitar
- Ben Lewis - Bass guitar
- Burne Sharpe - Drums
