= Diamonds & Debris =

Studio album by Cry of Love
- Released: 1997
- Recorded: 1996–1997
- Genre: Rock
- Label: Columbia
- Producer: John Custer

Cry of Love chronology
Brother (1993)	Diamonds & Debris (1997)

Diamonds & Debris is the second and final album by the American band Cry of Love, released in 1997. The band supported the album with a North American tour. The first single, "Sugarcane", peaked at No. 22 on Billboard's Mainstream Rock Tracks chart. Cry of Love broke up shortly after the album's release.

== Production ==
The album was produced by John Custer. Robert Mason took over lead vocals and guitar, replacing Kelly Holland; it took years for Cry of Love to find a satisfactory replacement. Lead guitar player and songwriter Audley Freed wrote most of the album's songs without knowing which vocalist would join the band. Freed used a variety of guitars in the studio, but chose to trust the quality of the instruments and amps rather than spend a lot of time trying to capture a specific tone. Some tracks were influenced by gospel music.

== Critical reception ==
Professional ratings
Review scores
Source	Rating
AllMusic	2/5 stars
Fort Worth Star-Telegram	2.5/5 stars
New Straits Times	3.5/5 stars
Winston-Salem Journal	2.5/4 stars

The New Straits Times wrote that Cry of Love offers "more of the raunchy, blues-tinged rockers that made its debut, Brother, so enthralling," writing that Freed "remains the propelling force, driving most of the tunes with some vibrant and vigorous Hendrixian riffing." The Hartford Courant determined that "things take a turn for the better at about the halfway point ... Mason's lyrics take on a more distinct and powerful presence and the band's Southern roots begin to rise to the surface." The Sunday Mail opined that the band's "vital, loud, guitar-driven approach lightly tinged with old-fashioned chug-along rhythms, works well even in this alterna-rock era."

The Fort Worth Star-Telegram concluded that "Mason tries, and a few of the songs have a genuinely soulful kick, but Diamonds is mostly a pale shadow of the past." The Wichita Eagle deemed Diamonds & Debris "a straightforward, guitar-oriented rock 'n' roll record, untainted yet influenced by country and soul." The Winston-Salem Journal noted that the songs "pay loud 'n' proud homage to the '70s riff-rock movement."

AllMusic wrote: "A little too musical for their own good, these Southern rockers fail to place their own personal stamp on Diamonds & Debris' many mid-tempo walk-throughs and forgettable ballads."

== Track listing ==
No.	Title	Length
1.	"Empty Castle"
2.	"Hung Out to Dry"
3.	"Sugarcane"
4.	"Fire in the Dry Grass"
5.	"Georgia Pines"
6.	"Warm River Pearl"
7.	"Sweet Mary's Gone"
8.	"Revelation (Rattlesnakes & Queens)"
9.	"Bring Me My Burden"
10.	"Sunday Morning Flood"
11.	"Diamonds & Debris"
12.	"Hung Out Redux"
13.	"Garden of Memories"
