= Glenn Buff =

American architect

Glenn Allen Jefferson Buff (November 7, 1927, in Newton, North Carolina – November 13, 2007) was an American architect. North Carolina has the third highest number of Modernist residences in the country. Modernist design became popular in the US in the 1930s, primarily in California, and expanded east through the 1960s. Glenn Buff was one of the architects who contributed to the state's design heritage during that time by influencing the modernist movements and designing modernist houses for people. Buff contributed by designing modernist houses and influencing the movement with his work.

Buff was the son of the Reverend Clarence Pinckney Buff and Junie Queen Buff.

== Early life ==
Buff was born in Newton, North Carolina, and, starting at the age of 17 served in the U.S. Navy between 1944 and 1948.

Buff graduated from North Carolina State University's School of Design in 1955 and worked for the Raleigh School Board. In the early 1950s, 1953–1955, he worked with Buckminster Fuller on experimental geodesic domes, a type of house that is in the shape of a dome.

== Later career ==
In 1955, he moved to Florida to be the head of the Design Department at Robert M. Little and Associates.

A member of the American Institute of Architects (AIA) National Board of Directors, he received the Anthony L. Pullora Memorial Award, the South Florida AIA Silver Medal, the Florida AIA Gold Medal for Outstanding Design & Service to the AIA, and the Upjohn Fellow from the AIA.

=== Projects ===
His notable projects include buildings at the University of Miami Business School, University of Miami Law School, University of Miami Maloney Hall and Student Center, and Miami International Airport Concourse E. He moved to Panama City, Florida, in 2000. Buff practiced as Glenn Buff and Partners in both Miami and Panama City.

1954 - The L. H. and Lizzy Jobe House, 2205 Garden Place, Raleigh, North Carolina.

Late 1950s - The Rosenman Residence, Coconut Grove, Florida.

1964 - Developer's Theme House in South Miami, Florida. It Won an American Institute of Architects Florida (AIAFL) award.

1980s - Restoration to a traditional 1920s house owned by the City of Coral Gables, Florida, won an AIAFL Honor Award

== Death ==
Buff died on November 13, 2007. He is survived by his wife, Joyce Dowell Buff, his daughter Deborah Joyce Buff, and sons Jonathan Glenn Buff, and Adam Jefferson Buff. Along with these, he was also survived by his three grandchildren, Robbyn Deborah Young, Katelyn Ann Buff and Andrew "Drew" Jennings Farr; and three sisters, Irene Starnes, Inez Hildebrand and Thelma Icard. He was predeceased by his parents and his sister, Gladys Campbell.

Funeral services were held on November 16, 2007, at First Presbyterian Church of Panama City, Florida.
