= Long, McCorkle and Murray Houses =

Historic house in North Carolina, United States

- U.S. National Register of Historic Places
- U.S. Historic district
- Location within North Carolina Location within the United States
- Location: 1310-1326 N. Main Ave., Newton, North Carolina
- Coordinates: 35°40′35″N 81°13′16″W
- Area: 2 acres (0.81 ha)
- Built: c. 1890, c. 1902-1910, c. 1920
- Architectural style: Bungalow/craftsman, Queen Anne
- MPS: Catawba County MPS
- NRHP reference No.: 90001371
- Added to NRHP: September 5, 1990

Long, McCorkle and Murray Houses is a set of three historic homes and national historic district located at Newton, Catawba County, North Carolina. The McCorkle House (c. 1890) reflects the popular Queen Anne style, while the Long (c. 1902–1910) and Murray (c. 1920) houses represent variations of the Bungalow style. The Long House property includes a contributing garage, servant's house, and landscape design.

It was listed on the National Register of Historic Places in 1990.
