= North Main Avenue Historic District =

Historic district in North Carolina, United States

- U.S. National Register of Historic Places
- U.S. Historic district
- Location within North Carolina Location within the United States
- Location: Roughly bounded by W. Ninth St., N. Main Ave., W. Fourth and W. Sixth Sts., N. Deal Ave., and W. Eighth St., Newton, North Carolina
- Coordinates: 35°40′08″N 81°13′26″W
- Area: 65 acres (26 ha)
- Built: 1842
- Architectural style: Colonial Revival, Bungalow/craftsman
- NRHP reference No.: 86001147
- Added to NRHP: May 22, 1986

North Main Avenue Historic District is a national historic district in Newton, North Carolina. The district encompasses 86 contributing buildings in a primarily residential neighborhood of Newton. Most of the buildings date from the late-19th an early-20th century and includes notable examples of Colonial Revival and Bungalow / American Craftsman style architecture. Notable buildings include the Junius R. Gaither House (c. 1936), First Presbyterian Church (1878), Eli M. Deal House (1904), Wade C. Raymer House (1923), William W. Trott House (c. 1897), Dr. Glenn Long House (c. 1910, 1935), Hewitt-McCorkle House (1920), Andrew J. Seagle House (c. 1861), Walter C. Feimster House (1908), Robert B. Knox House (1912), (Former) Newton High School (1905, 1935), Henkel-Williams-White House (c. 1883), Loomis F. Klutz House (c. 1927), (former) Newton Elementary School (1923, 1930), and Beth Eden Lutheran Church (1929).

It was added to the National Register of Historic Places in 1986.
