= Bost-Burris House =

Historic house in North Carolina, United States

- U.S. National Register of Historic Places
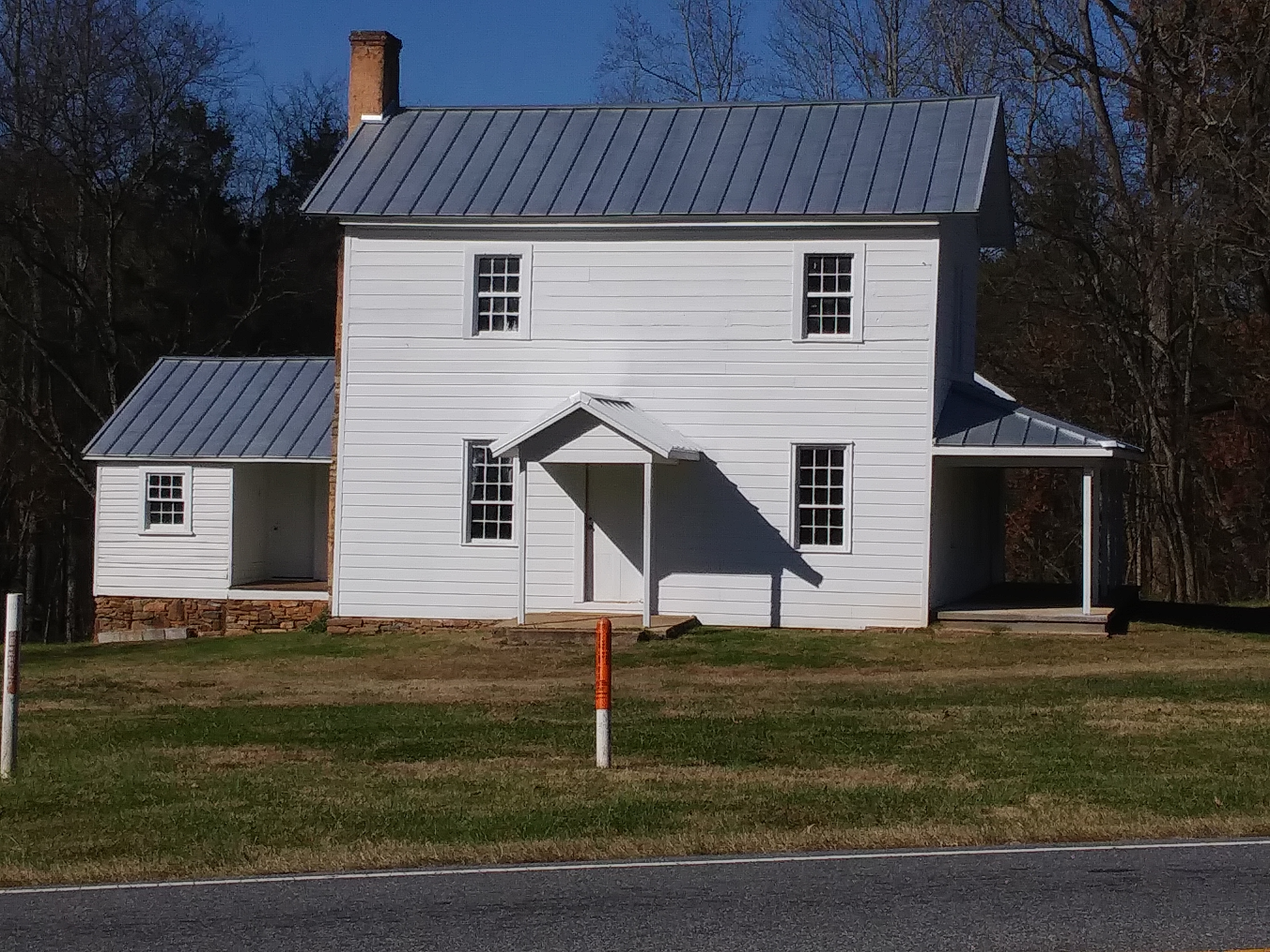
- Bost-Burris House

- Location within North Carolina Location within the United States
- Location: Junction of SR 1149 and SR 1154, near Newton, North Carolina
- Coordinates: 35°40′0″N 81°14′58″W
- Area: 4.4 acres (1.8 ha)
- Built: c. 1810
- Built by: Bost, Elias
- Architectural style: Federal
- MPS: Catawba County MPS
- NRHP reference No.: 90001033
- Added to NRHP: July 5, 1990

Bost-Burris House, also known as the Elias Burris House, is a historic home located near Newton, Catawba County, North Carolina. It was built about 1810, and is a two-story, hall-and-parlor plan, frame dwelling. It is three bays wide and has an exterior end stone chimney. It has a 1 1/2-story ell dated to the late-1860s, and a one-story ell from the late-1890s. The interior retains Federal style design elements from its original construction.

It was listed on the National Register of Historic Places in 1990.
