= Rudisill–Wilson House =

Historic house in North Carolina, United States

- Rudisill-Wilson House
- U.S. National Register of Historic Places
- Location within North Carolina Location within the United States
- Location: Southwest of Newton off NC 10, near Newton, North Carolina
- Coordinates: 35°36′58″N 81°15′23″W
- Area: 9.9 acres (4.0 ha)
- Built: c. 1820
- NRHP reference No.: 73001315
- Added to NRHP: August 14, 1973

Rudisill–Wilson House is a historic home located near Newton, Catawba County, North Carolina. It was built about 1820, and is a two-story, three-bay, central hall plan frame dwelling. It features exterior end chimneys and a shed porch with late-19th century brackets.

It was listed on the National Register of Historic Places in 1973.
