= Foil–Cline House =

Historic house in North Carolina, United States

- Foil-Cline House
- U.S. National Register of Historic Places
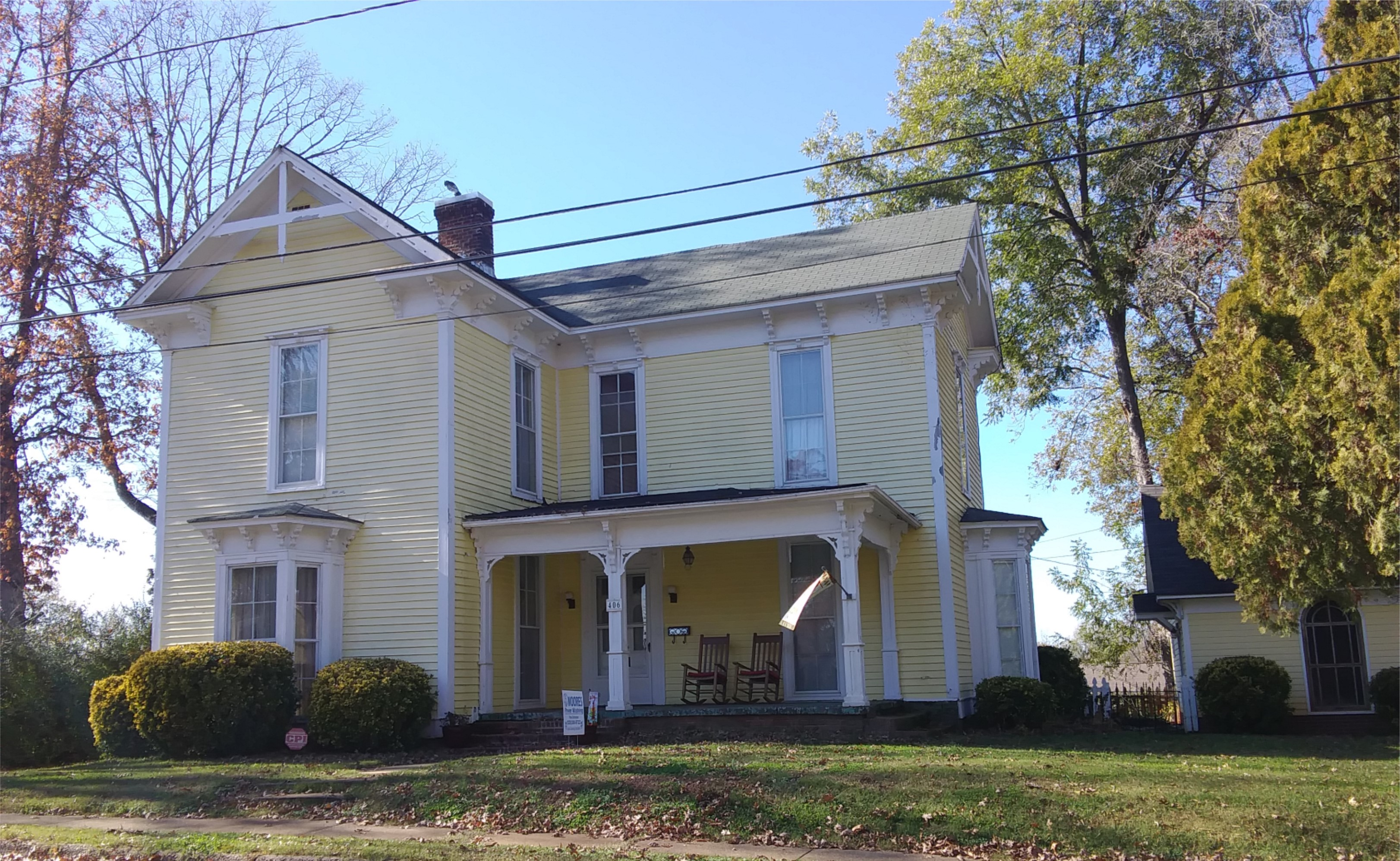
- Foil Cline House

- Location within North Carolina Location within the United States
- Location: 406 S. Main Ave., Newton, North Carolina
- Coordinates: 35°39′29″N 81°13′29″W
- Area: less than one acre
- Built: 1883
- Architectural style: Italianate
- MPS: Catawba County MPS
- NRHP reference No.: 90001034
- Added to NRHP: July 5, 1990

Foil–Cline House, also known as the John A. Foil House, is a historic home located at Newton, Catawba County, North Carolina. It was built in 1883, and is a two-story, L-shaped, Italianate style frame dwelling. It features a multi-gabled roof has a widely overhanging boxed and molded cornice supported by thick curvilinear brackets and porch with overhanging bracketed eaves.

It was listed on the National Register of Historic Places in 1990.
