= Self–Trott–Bickett House =

Historic house in North Carolina, United States

- Self-Trott-Bickett House
- U.S. National Register of Historic Places
- Location within North Carolina Location within the United States
- Location: 331 S. College Ave., Newton, North Carolina
- Coordinates: 35°39′32″N 81°13′22″W
- Area: less than one acre
- Built: 1881-1883
- Architectural style: Classical Revival, Italianate
- MPS: Catawba County MPS
- NRHP reference No.: 90001037
- Added to NRHP: July 5, 1990

Self–Trott–Bickett House is a historic home located at Newton, Catawba County, North Carolina. It was built between 1881 and 1883, and is a two-story brick, double pile house with a rear ell and Italianate and Classical Revival style design elements. It has a low hipped roof, exterior end chimneys, and a wraparound porch. It was the home of Lawrence Bickett, a grocery wholesaler and brother of North Carolina governor Thomas Walter Bickett.

It was listed on the National Register of Historic Places in 1990.
