= Grace Reformed Church (Newton, North Carolina) =

Historic church in North Carolina, United States

- U.S. National Register of Historic Places
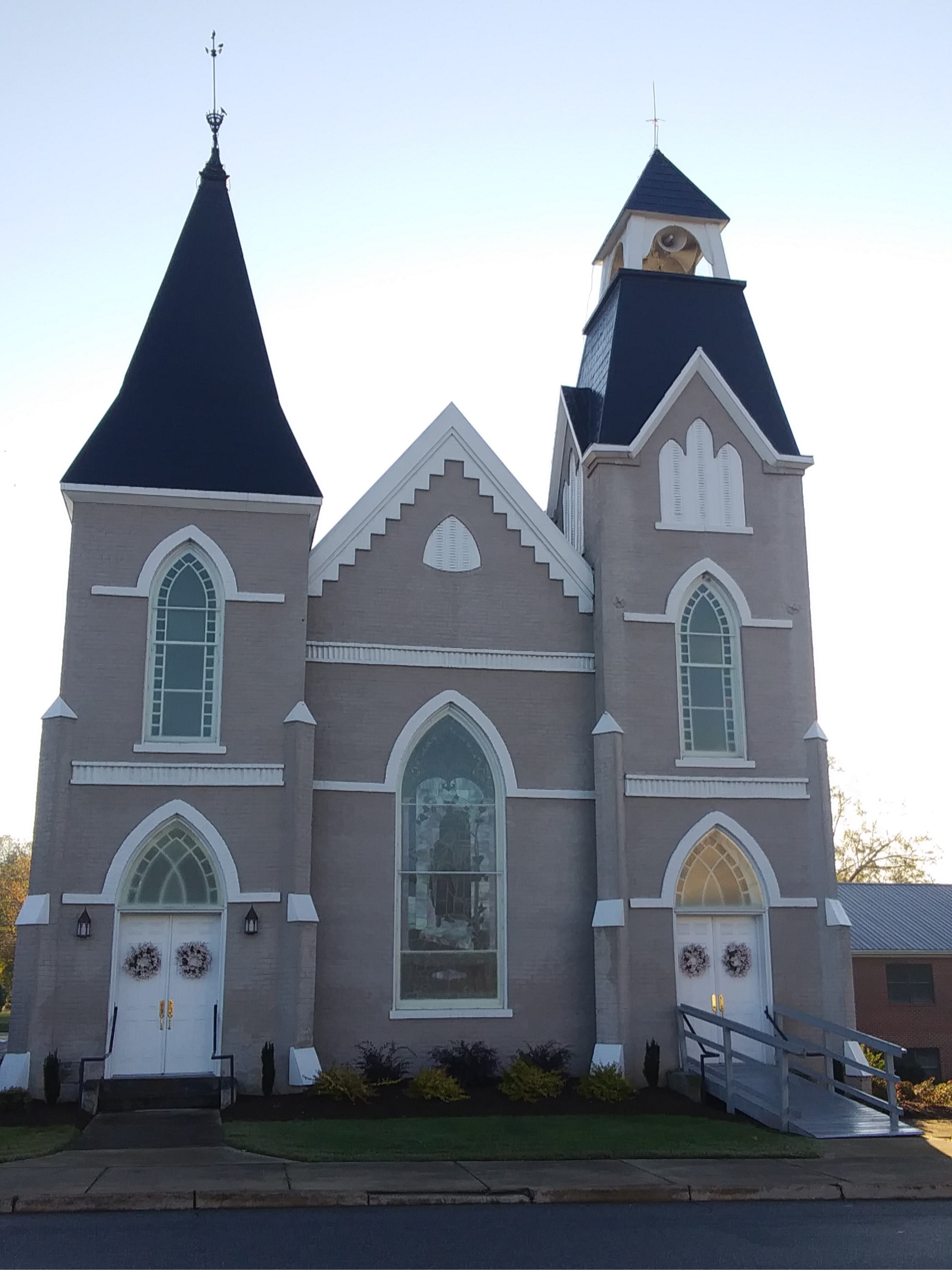

- Location within North Carolina Location within the United States
- Location: 201-211 S. Main Ave. Newton, North Carolina
- Coordinates: 35°39′40″N 81°13′23″W
- Area: less than one acre
- Built: 1887-1888, 1927-1928
- Architectural style: Gothic Revival
- MPS: Catawba County MPS
- NRHP reference No.: 90001035
- Added to NRHP: July 05, 1990

Grace Reformed Church, also known as Calvary Baptist Church (since 1959), is a historic church located at 201–211 S. Main Avenue in Newton, Catawba County, North Carolina, United States.

== History ==
It was built in 1887–1888, and is a Gothic Revival-style church building. It has a cruciform plan, steeply pitched gable roof, corner towers of unequal height, and lancet arched doors and windows. Attached to the church in 1927–1928, is a two-story Sunday School Building with a gable roof.

It was added to the National Register of Historic Places in 1990.
