= Perkins House (Newton, North Carolina) =

Historic house in North Carolina, United States

- U.S. National Register of Historic Places
- Location within North Carolina Location within the United States
- Location: North of Catawba off I-40, near Newton, North Carolina
- Coordinates: 35°44′0″N 81°4′23″W
- Area: 9 acres (3.6 ha)
- Built: c. 1790
- Architectural style: Federal
- NRHP reference No.: 74001336
- Added to NRHP: October 1, 1974

Perkins House is a historic home located near Newton, Catawba County, North Carolina. It was built about 1790, and is a two-story, three bay Federal style brick dwelling. It features a hip-roof porch and a very wide, double shoulder chimney with flared headers. The interior woodwork was removed by the Museum of Early Southern Decorative Arts, Old Salem.

It was listed on the National Register of Historic Places in 1974.
