= Bunker Hill High School =

American public school in North Carolina

Location
- 4675 Oxford School Road; Claremont, North Carolina 28610; United States; 35°45′13″N 81°07′13″W

Information
- Type: Public
- Established: 1954 (72 years ago)
- School district: Catawba County Schools
- CEEB code: 340745
- Principal: Preston Clarke
- Faculty: 66
- Teaching staff: 48.22 (FTE)
- Grades: 9–12
- Enrollment: 883 (2023-2024)
- Student to teacher ratio: 18.31
- Campus type: Rural
- Colors: Cardinal red and black
- Athletics: NCHSAA 4A
- Athletics conference: Western Foothills 4A/5A
- Nickname: Bears
- Yearbook: BunHiHi
- Website: bunkerhill.catawbaschools.net

Bunker Hill High School is a public high school located in Claremont, North Carolina, United States. It is part of the Catawba County Schools district. The school was built for $359,530 and was formally dedicated on April 1, 1955.

== Athletics ==
Bunker Hill is a member of the North Carolina High School Athletic Association (NCHSAA) and are classified as a 4A school. The school is a part of the Western Foothills 4A/5A Conference. Bunker Hill's school colors are cardinal red and black, and its team name is the Bears. Sports at Bunker Hill include:

- Baseball
- Basketball
- Competition Cheerleading
- Cross Country
- Football
- Golf
- Marching Band
- Soccer
- Softball
- Swimming
- Tennis
- Track & Field
- Volleyball
- Wrestling

== Notable alumni ==
- Teresa Earnhardt, former NASCAR team owner
- Landon Huffman, stock car racing driver and YouTuber
