= Bolick Historic District =

Historic district in North Carolina, United States

- U.S. National Register of Historic Places
- U.S. Historic district
- Location within North Carolina Location within the United States
- Location: First Ave. S. between US 64/70 and 12th St., Conover, North Carolina
- Coordinates: 35°41′49″N 81°13′15″W
- Area: 11 acres (4.5 ha)
- Built: 1883
- Built by: Clemmer, R.L.; Herman & Sipe
- Architectural style: Colonial Revival, Bungalow/craftsman
- MPS: Catawba County MPS
- NRHP reference No.: 90001032
- Added to NRHP: July 5, 1990

Bolick Historic District, also known as Bolick Buggy Shop and Bolick Family Houses, is a national historic district located at Conover, Catawba County, North Carolina. The district encompasses 9 contributing building and 1 contributing structure. The district includes the remaining buildings of the Jerome Bolick & Sons Company buggy works and four houses with accompanying outbuildings which were erected by members of the Bolick family. The houses include examples of Colonial Revival and Bungalow / American Craftsman architecture.

It was added to the National Register of Historic Places in 1990.
