= George Huffman Farm =

Historic farm in North Carolina, United States

- U.S. National Register of Historic Places
- U.S. Historic district
- Location within North Carolina Location within the United States
- Location: SR 1479, southeast of the junction with Tate Blvd., near Conover, North Carolina
- Coordinates: 35°42′45″N 81°15′16″W
- Area: 17 acres (6.9 ha)
- Built: c. 1810
- Architectural style: Federal
- MPS: Catawba County MPS
- NRHP reference No.: 90000861
- Added to NRHP: June 21, 1990

George Huffman Farm, also known as the Huffman-Herman Farm and Huffman-Punch-Herman Farm, is a historic farm and national historic district located near Conover, Catawba County, North Carolina. The district encompasses 2 contributing buildings and 1 contributing site. The main house was built about 1810, and is a two-story, single pile, frame, vernacular Federal style farmhouse. Also on the property are the contributing storage shed and Huffman Family Cemetery. Established by prosperous farmer, wagon-maker and cooper George Huffman, and farmed by his son-in-law William Punch later in the nineteenth century, the farm now lies fallow with most of the acreage wooded and heavily overgrown, yet the acreage continues to provide an appropriate setting for the built resources.

The house was built by George Huffman sometime between 1807 and 1815; during these years Huffman acquired the 415 acres which formed his home plantation. Huffman, the son of Balthazar Huffman (1741-1798) and Catherine Wagoner Huffman, was born in Lincoln County in 1780. (Of note, Catawba County was later split from the original Lincoln County area, meaning that Mr. Huffman was likely born in what is now known as Catawba County). In 1801 he married Catherine Houk or Hook (1778-1862) and by 1810 they were the parents of five children; the Huffmans eventually had five sons and five daughters.

Huffman was evidently a respected citizen of his community as he was elected Captain of the Eighth Company detached from the Second Lincoln Regiment at the out-break of the War of 1812. Only a small number of North Carolina troops saw active service in the war, and the details of Huffman's wartime experiences are unknown.

At the time of the 1820 census, Huffman headed a twelve-member household and owned one female slave. In 1830 he was the head of an eight-member household consisting of only four persons, but his slaves had increased to four in number by that time. Two members of the household were engaged in farming, and one in manufacturing; the latter person was probably Huffman himself, working as a wagon-maker and cooper. Huffman was probably assisted in his work by his sons, Langdon (b. 1822), a wagon-maker and George (b. 1812) a blacksmith. The 1840 Lincoln County tax list recorded the value of Huffman's 415 acre farm as $1,045 and his payment of taxes on three slaves and a stud horse.

George Huffman died on December 9, 1848, and was buried in the family cemetery a few hundred yards from where his house once stood. Huffman's will, prepared in 1847, indicates that he died in prosperous circumstances. He divided the bulk of his real estate among his nine surviving children. To his wife, Huffman gave for her lifetime the house and outbuildings, except the threshing machine house and ninety-eight acres. He also provided her with food, staples, farm crops, livestock, farm tools, $100 in cash, slaves Mat and Eve, three beds, a desk, a table, six chairs, and all kitchen furniture, as well as his cariole and horse. Other house-hold furnishings were sold at Huffman's estate sale and included three beds, two candle-stands, two chests, a table, a half-round table, a clock, a corner cupboard, a looking glass, six chairs and a small library of sixteen books, among which were two medical books, a geography book, a law book and a dictionary. Other items sold at the estate sale were many farming tools, four horses, a bull, a threshing machine, a windmill, and slaves Squires and Judith. Huffman's work as a wagon maker and cooper was reflected in the extensive number of woodworking tools and materials sold, such as coopers tools, blacksmiths tools, turning tools, several work benches, wagon wood, patterns, spokes, planks, twenty-three hogsheads and wagon and tent cloth. The sale netted the estate $1,329. Huffman probably served as a local banker as many individuals owed him a total of $979.82 in notes with interest due. Judging from his will and estate sale, Huffman must have enjoyed a certain amount of financial success from his farming and manufacturing endeavors.

Huffman's widow continued to live in the house until her death in 1862. The census of 1850 recorded that her household consisted of herself and seven slaves. Her ninety-eight acre farm was valued at $450 with only forty acres cultivated, producing 300 bushels of corn, 70 bushels of oats, and 30 bushels of wheat. Livestock on the farm included a horse, a cow, a sheep and eight pigs. Ten years later, only two slaves remained in Mrs. Huffman's household and the value of her farm had increased by only $50 while farm production remained at 1850 levels. Mrs. Huffman died on July 23, 1862, and was buried beside her husband in the family cemetery near the house. Her estate sale of personal property netted $575 while notes due her estate totaled another $114.

The identity of the owners and occupants of the Huffman House immediately after Mrs. Huffman's death is unknown. When Mrs. Huffman's sons and administrators, George and Elijah Huffman filed their accounts with the county court in October 1862, they also reported their final account as the executors of their father's estate which then consisted only of the house and ninety-eight acres. The Huffman brothers reported the sale of their father's property in August 1862 for $3,000; the high price probably reflected wartime inflation. However, no deed had been located for the sale of the house until 1891 when the heirs of William Punch, son-in-law of George and Susannah Huffman, sold the house and seven acres of land. Punch (1819-1873), married to Amy Huffman, was probably the 1862 purchaser of the house. In the 1870 census, he was listed as a farmer with personal property worth #300. His 159-acre farm, with 120 improved acres, was valued at $800 and produced 160 bushels of oats, 150 bushels of corn, 75 bushels of wheat and 37 bushels of rye; his livestock consisted of a horse, 3 cows,7 sheep and 8 swine. Punch died in 1873 and his land was divided among his widow, children and grandchildren, but the details of the division are unknown. In July 1891 J. L. Punch sold the house with seven acres for $100 to J. R. Gaither, who sold the property six months later for $75.00 to Milton L. Herman, whose descendants owned the house until recently.

Milton Lafayette Herman (1871/74-1950) was a member of a family long-settled in Lincoln and Catawba Counties. At the time of the 1900 census he was living in the house with his wife Ida and children Lillie and Vernon. The census noted that Herman was a farmer but that he rented his farm. By 1915, however Herman had acquired a thirty-three acre farm near his house tract. The 1915 county tax list recorded the value of his seven-acre house site at $69.00. Changes to the house during Herman's occupancy included the stair and the addition of brackets to the gable eaves when the roof was extended. When Herman purchased the house, it was known as the “Red House” because of its reddish-brown color, but the Herman family had painted the house white. Milton Herman died in 1950 after living in the house for 48 years. The house was inherited by his son Wortha Herman who continued to own the house until recently. The seven acre house lot was at some undermined date, reunited with some of the original George Huffman farm, creating the remaining 17.4 acres. The house and remaining farm is currently owned by Classic Leather, Inc., a leather upholstery company. The company owners keep the house and grounds mowed and plan to continue to preserve the house and cemetery.

The "George Huffman" house has recently been moved to the historic Murray's Mill site on Murray's Mill Road in Catawba County, where it can be toured/visited by visitors of the mill. Mr. Huffman was a man of great rapport in Catawba County in the 1800s. George Huffman (1780-1848) owned a vast amount of property, farming equipment and several slaves. He was a Captain in the War of 1812, though was frequently referred to as "Major" George Huffman.

It was added to the National Register of Historic Places in 1990.
