= Catawba County Schools =

School district in North Carolina, US

Location
- Catawba County, North Carolina United States

District information
- Type: Public
- Motto: Engage. Inspire. Empower.
- Grades: PK–12
- Superintendent: Dr. Matthew Stover
- Accreditation: AdvancED
- Schools: 28
- Budget: $ 173,714,000
- NCES District ID: 3700690

Students and staff
- Students: 17,370
- Teachers: 1,085.05 (on FTE basis)
- Staff: 974.10 (on FTE basis)
- Student–teacher ratio: 16.01:1

Other information
- Website: www.catawbaschools.net

Catawba County Schools is the largest school district in Catawba County, North Carolina, United States. Its 28 schools serve 17,370 students as of the 2010–11 school year.

The majority of the county is within this school district.

== Student demographics ==
For the 2010–11 school year, Catawba County Schools had a total population of 17,370 students and 1,085.05 teachers on a (FTE) basis. This produced a student-teacher ratio of 16.01:1. That same year, out of the student total, the gender ratio was 51% male to 49% female. The demographic group makeup was: Black, 6%; White, 72%; Hispanic, 12%; Asian/Pacific Islander, 7%; and American Indian, 0% (two or more races: 4%). For the same school year, 48.41% of the students received free and reduced-cost lunches.

== Governance and funding ==
The primary governing body of Catawba County Schools follows a council–manager government format with a seven-member Board of Education appointing a Superintendent to run the day-to-day operations of the system. The school system currently resides in the North Carolina State Board of Education's Seventh District.

=== Board of education ===
The seven-member Board of Education generally meets on the last Monday of each month with other meetings called as needed. The current members of the board are: Sherry Butler (Chair), Marilyn McRee (Vice-Chair), Ronn Abernathy, David Brittain, Glenn Fulbright, Cathy Starnes, and Charlie Wyant.

=== Superintendent ===
The current Superintendent of Catawba County Schools is Dr. Matthew Stover as of November 1, 2016. Dr. Stover has a career in public education spanning more than 15 years in North Carolina. He most recently served as the Associate Superintendent of the Lincoln County Schools. In that role since 2013, Dr. Stover has worked as a key member of the school system's administrative team in several areas, including safety and security, athletics, maintenance, capital and bond projects, facilities, contracts, and technology. Dr. Stover also served as the Assistant Superintendent of Human Resources for Lincoln County Schools from 2011-2013, where he led all aspects of human resources leadership and management for the school system. He was an assistant principal (2003-2007) and principal (2007-2011) for Lincoln County Schools and began his career in public education as a high school teacher and coach in Cleveland County.

Dr. Matthew Stover earned his bachelor's degree in social studies education from Indiana University of Pennsylvania. He also attended Gardner-Webb University in Boiling Springs, N.C., where he obtained a master's degree in school administration in 2003, and a doctorate in educational leadership in 2009.

The previous superintendent of Catawba County Schools is Dr. Dan Brigman. He began in July, 2012, and was previously the superintendent at Macon County Schools.

== Member schools ==
Catawba County Schools has 28 schools ranging from pre-kindergarten to twelfth grade. Those 28 schools are separated into eight high schools, five middle schools, 16 elementary schools, and one pre-school.

=== High schools ===
- Bandys High School (Catawba)
- Bunker Hill High School (Claremont)
- Catawba Rosenwald Education Center – alternative school, grades 6–12 (Catawba)
- Challenger Early College High School (Hickory)
- Fred T. Foard High School (Newton)
- Maiden High School (Maiden)
- St. Stephens High School (Hickory)

=== Middle schools ===
- H. M. Arndt Middle School (Hickory)
- Jacobs Fork Middle School (Newton)
- Mill Creek Middle School (Claremont)
- Maiden Middle School (Maiden)
- River Bend Middle School (Claremont)

=== Elementary schools ===
- Balls Creek Elementary School (Newton)
- Banoak Elementary School (southern Catawba County, near Vale, Lincoln County)
- Blackburn Elementary School (Newton)
- C. H. Tuttle Elementary School (Maiden)
- Catawba Elementary School (Catawba)
- Claremont Elementary School (Claremont)
- Clyde Campbell Elementary School (Hickory)
- Lyle Creek Elementary School (Conover)
- Maiden Elementary School (Maiden)
- Mountain View Elementary School (Hickory)
- Oxford Elementary School (Claremont)
- Sherrills Ford Elementary School (Sherrills Ford)
- Snow Creek Elementary School (Hickory)
- St. Stephens Elementary School (Conover)
- Startown Elementary School (Newton)
- Webb A. Murray Elementary School (Hickory)

=== Preschool ===
- Sweetwater Early Childhood Education Center (Hickory)

== Athletics ==
According to the North Carolina High School Athletic Association, for the 2012–2013 school year:

- Bandys, Bunker Hill, and Maiden high schools are 2A schools in the Catawba Valley Conference.
- Fred T. Foard and St. Stephens high schools are 3A schools in the Northwestern Conference.
- Challenger is a 1A Independent school.
- Catawba Rosenwald Education Center does not have athletic teams.

== See also ==
- List of school districts in North Carolina
