= St. Stephens High School =

American public school in North Carolina

Location
- 3205 34th Street Drive NE; Hickory, North Carolina 28601; United States; 35°46′18″N 81°16′07″W

Information
- Type: Public
- Established: 1934 (92 years ago)
- School district: Catawba County Schools
- CEEB code: 341825
- Principal: Kyle Stocks
- Staff: 67.00 (FTE)
- Grades: 9–12
- Enrollment: 1,298 (2023-2024)
- Student to teacher ratio: 19.37
- Colors: Red, grey, white
- Team name: Indians
- Yearbook: The Corona
- Feeder schools: Harry M. Arndt Middle School
- Website: ststephenshs.catawbaschools.net

St. Stephens High School is a high school located in Hickory, North Carolina, United States. It is in Catawba County, and is part of the Catawba County Schools district.

== History ==
St. Stephens High School was formed when Allen Frye, Peace Academy, Lail, Sandy Ridge, and Cloninger combined into one school. The school first opened in the fall of 1934, with R. N. Hoyle serving as the first teacher and principal. The first school building was used by elementary through high school students until 1953, when a new building was provided specifically for St. Stephens High School students.

As of 2025, the principal is Kyle Stocks. St. Stephens enrolls approximately 1,250 students each year. Harry M. Arndt Middle School is the feeder school of St. Stephens.

St. Stephen's team's name is the "Indians". In 21st century America, an "Indian" mascot is widely considered to be a racist trope. Even after the local Cherokee, a federally recognized Native American nation, protested use of an "Indian" as the school's mascot, the school administration ignored their concerns and retained it.

== Athletics ==
St. Stephens is a member of the North Carolina High School Athletic Association (NCHSAA) and are classified as a 6A school. The school is a member of the Northwestern 6A/7A Conference. St. Stephen's school colors are red, black, gray, and white, and its team name is the Indians. Sports at St. Stephens include:

- Baseball
- Basketball
- Competition Cheerleading
- Cross Country
- Football
- Golf
- Marching Band
- Lacrosse
- Soccer
- Softball
- Swimming
- Tennis
- Track & Field
- Volleyball
- Wrestling

=== Baseball ===
The school won three straight NCHSAA 2A baseball state championships in 1971, 1972 and 1973.

=== Wrestling ===
The wrestling team won the NCHSAA 3A dual team state championship in 2019, finishing the season 43–0.

== Notable alumni ==
- Mark K. Hilton, member of the North Carolina General Assembly representing the state's 96th district
- Andy Houston, former NASCAR driver in the Craftsman Truck Series, Busch Series, and Winston Cup Series
- Shane Huffman, former NASCAR driver and current crew chief
- Drew Starkey, American actor
