= Warlick–Huffman Farm =

Historic farm in North Carolina, United States

- Warlick-Huffman Farm
- U.S. National Register of Historic Places
- U.S. Historic district
- Location within North Carolina Location within the United States
- Location: SR 1116 northwest of the junction with NC 10, near Propst Crossroads, North Carolina
- Coordinates: 35°37′04″N 81°24′48″W
- Area: 73 acres (30 ha)
- Built: c. 1820
- Architectural style: Federal
- MPS: Catawba County MPS
- NRHP reference No.: 90000862
- Added to NRHP: June 21, 1990

Warlick–Huffman Farm, also known as the Solomon Warlick House, is a historic farm and national historic district located near Propst Crossroads, Catawba County, North Carolina. The district encompasses 7 contributing buildings, 1 contributing site and 7 contributing structures. The house was built about 1820, and is a two-story, vernacular Federal style frame farmhouse. Also on the property are the contributing Kitchen (c. 1820), outhouse, woodshed, six chicken coops, corn crib, and stackhouse / granary.

It was added to the National Register of Historic Places in 1990.
