= Cry of Love (band) =

American rock band

Background information
- Origin: Raleigh, North Carolina, U.S.
- Genres: Southern rock; hard rock
- Years active: 1989–1997
- Label: Columbia Records
- Past members: Audley Freed; Robert Kearns; Jason Patterson; Pee Wee Watson; Kelly Holland; Robert Mason

Cry of Love was an American rock band formed in Raleigh, North Carolina, in 1989. The group released their debut album in 1993, Brother, produced by John Custer, before hitting the road for the next 17 months. After completing their 1993–94 touring cycle, frontman Kelly Holland quit the band, saying he could no longer handle the rigors of the road. They scored a number-one hit on Billboard's Mainstream Rock chart with "Peace Pipe" in 1993.

Ex-Lynch Mob and current Warrant singer Robert Mason was recruited as Holland's replacement in 1996. Together they released a new album in 1997 (Diamonds & Debris), but the band split shortly afterwards.

Former band member Audley Freed was recruited to the Black Crowes in 1998, and he played with the band until October 2001. He also played on Crowes' lead singer Chris Robinson's second solo album in 2004, and on the subsequent tour.

Bassist Robert Kearns later played with Lynyrd Skynyrd, after the death of Ean Evans, until early 2012. Freed and Kearns formed a band named Big Hat that also includes Keith Gattis – vocals/guitar; Peter Stroud – guitars; Fred Eltringham – drums; Ike Stubblefield – keyboards. These days, Freed and Kearns, along with Freed's wife, Jen, and Stroud, are part of Sheryl Crow's touring band.

Former lead singer Kelly Holland died on February 24, 2014, in Raleigh, North Carolina after battling a serious abdominal infection. He was 52. Holland is survived by his son Elijah Holland.

The band's debut, Brother, was reissued by French indie label Bad Reputation in 2016 and includes an additional five songs previously released on various singles as bonus tracks.

== Members ==
- Audley Freed – guitar (1989–1997)
- Robert Kearns – bass, vocals (1989–1997)
- Jason Patterson – drums (1989–1997)
- Pee Wee Watson – vocals, guitar (1989–1990)
- Kelly Holland – vocals, guitar (1991–1994; died 2014)
- Robert Mason – vocals, guitar (1996–1997)

== Discography ==
=== Studio albums ===
- Brother (May 1993)
1. "Highway Jones" (A. Freed, K. Holland) 5:12
2. "Pretty As You Please" (A. Freed) 3:47
3. "Bad Thing" (K. Holland, A. Freed, J. Custer) 3:07
4. "Too Cold in the Winter" (K. Holland, A. Freed) 3:54
5. "Hand Me Down" (A. Freed) 5:01
6. "Gotta Love Me" (A. Freed, K. Holland, J. Custer) 3:25
7. "Carnival" (A. Freed) 5:10
8. "Drive It Home" (A. Freed, K. Holland, J. Custer) 4:06
9. "Peace Pipe" (A. Freed, K. Holland) 3:58
10. "Saving Grace" (A. Freed) 6:23

2016 Bad Reputation reissue bonus tracks:

1. "Shade Tree" (A. Freed, J. Custer, K. Holland) 3:45
2. "Deathbed" (J. Custer) 1:30
3. "Peace Pipe" (live) (A. Freed, K. Holland) 5:01
4. "I Ain't Superstitious" (live) (W. Dixon) 5:00
5. "Bad Thing" (live) (A. Freed, J. Custer, K. Holland) 7:10
- Diamonds & Debris (August 1997)
1. "Empty Castle" 4:29
2. "Hung Out to Dry" 4:46
3. "Sugarcane" 3:26
4. "Fire in the Dry Grass" 5:24
5. "Georgia Pine" 4:28
6. "Warm River Pearl" (Mike Wilson) 4:27
7. "Sweet Mary's Gone" 4:26
8. "Revelation (Rattlesnakes & Queens)" 3:17
9. "Bring Me My Burden" 5:23
10. "Sunday Morning Flood" 7:08
11. "Diamonds & Debris" 3:58
12. "Hung Out Redux" 1:19
13. "Garden of Memories" (Mike Wilson) 4:07

=== Singles ===
- "Bad Thing" (1993) U.S. Mainstream Rock No. 2; UK No. 60
- "Peace Pipe" (1993) U.S. Mainstream Rock No. 1
- "Too Cold in the Winter" (1994) U.S. Mainstream Rock No. 13
- "Sugarcane" (1997) U.S. Mainstream Rock No. 22
