= Discovery High School of Newton-Conover =

American public school in North Carolina

Discovery High School

Location
- 605 North Ashe Ave; Newton, North Carolina 28658; United States; 35°40′06″N 81°13′21″W

Information
- Type: Public
- Established: 2005 (21 years ago)
- CEEB code: 342911
- Principal: Shane Whitener
- Grades: 9–12
- Enrollment: 162 (2023-2024)
- Colors: Black, maroon, gold
- Mascot: Gryphon
- Website: dhs.newton-conover.org

Discovery High School is part of Newton-Conover City Schools and is one of the two high schools in the district, alongside Newton-Conover High School. Established in 2005, it was created through a partnership grant with the North Carolina New Schools Project and the Bill and Melinda Gates Foundation. As of 2021, The school has 211 students on roll in grades 9–12.
