= Newton Downtown Historic District (Newton, North Carolina) =

Historic district in North Carolina, United States

- U.S. National Register of Historic Places
- U.S. Historic district
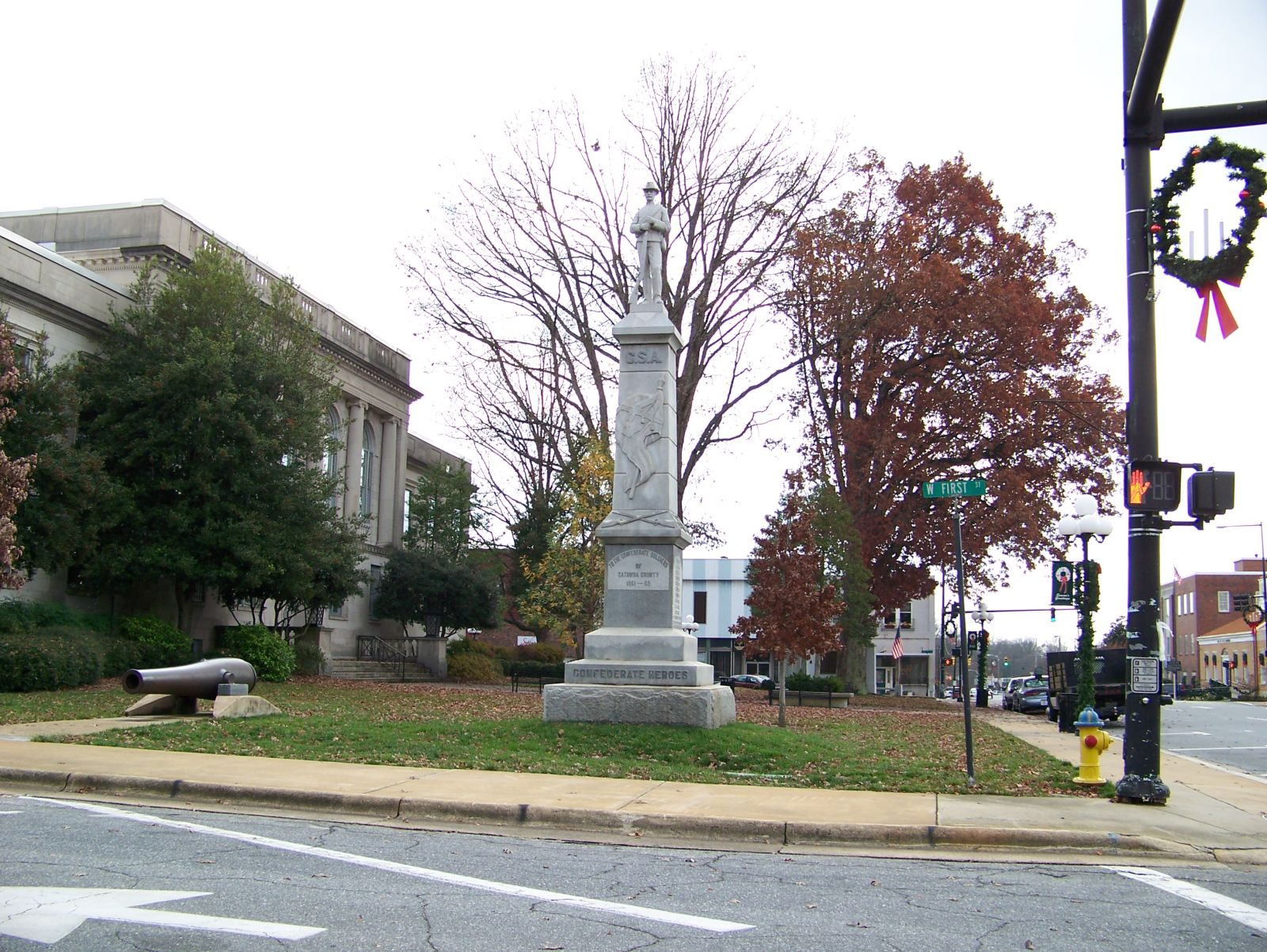
- Catawba County CSA Memorial (1907)

- Location within North Carolina Location within the United States
- Location: Roughly bounded by 2nd & A Sts., & N. Forney, & N. Ashe Aves., Newton, North Carolina
- Coordinates: 35°39′48″N 81°13′17″W
- Area: 9.5 acres (3.8 ha)
- Built: c. 1860-1961
- Architectural style: Greek Revival, Romanesque, Beaux Arts, Spanish Colonial Revival, Bungalow/Craftsman, I-house
- NRHP reference No.: 12000253
- Added to NRHP: May 1, 2012

Newton Downtown Historic District is a national historic district located at Newton, Catawba County, North Carolina. The district encompasses 50 contributing buildings and 5 contributing objects in the central business district of Newton. Notable buildings include the First National Bank of Catawba County (c. 1923), H&W Drug Company (c. 1898, c. 1938), Belk-Brumley Department Store (c. 1920, c. 1940), Alman Furniture Company Building (c. 1950), Catawba County Courthouse (1924), Ervin Apartments (1936), Sanitary Grocery (c. 1905), Freeze Drug Store (c. 1906), Catawba County Library (1954), Haupt Building (c. 1955), City Hall and Fire Station (c. 1925), and Eagle Building (c. 1920).

It was listed on the National Register of Historic Places in 2012.
