= Harry Bolick =

American athlete and coach (1912–1999)

- Bolick, after being hired at Erskine, standing with the only remaining football equipment

Biographical details
- Born: October 29, 1912; Charleston, South Carolina, U.S.
- Died: November 21, 1999 (aged 87); Clinton, South Carolina, U.S.

Playing career

Football
- 1932–1934: Presbyterian

Boxing
- 1931–1934: Presbyterian

Basketball
- c. 1932–1935: Presbyterian

Baseball
- c. 1932–1935: Presbyterian
- 1940: Gaffney Manufacturing Company Red Sox
- Positions: Fullback (football); First baseman, pitcher (baseball)

Coaching career (HC unless noted)

Football
- 1935–1937: High Point HS
- 1938: Lake View HS
- 1939–1940: Gaffney HS (asst.)
- 1946: Erskine
- 1947: Seneca HS
- 1948–?: Ford HS

Basketball
- 1935–1938: High Point HS
- 1938–1939: Lake View HS
- 1946–1947: Erskine

Boxing
- 1935–1938: High Point HS
- 1938–1939: Lake View HS

Baseball
- 1938: Lake View HS
- 1940: Gaffney Manufacturing Company Red Sox
- 1946 Note (Note: Bolick was said to have continued coaching until 1966 in his The State obituary. However, the teams he coached are unknown.): Erskine

Administrative career (AD unless noted)
- 1938–1939: Lake View HS
- 1946–1947: Erskine

Head coaching record
- Overall: 0–9 (college football)

Accomplishments and honors

Awards
- First-team All-State (1934); Jacobs Blocking Trophy (1934)

Harry Edmund Bolick Jr. (October 29, 1912 – November 21, 1999) was an American athlete and sports coach. He played several sports at Presbyterian, and was best known for football: he was team captain and won the Jacobs Blocking Trophy in 1934. Bolick later coached several high schools in the area, as well as for one year the athletics at Erskine College.

== Early life and education ==
Bolick was born on October 29, 1912, in Charleston, South Carolina. He attended North Charleston High School and was captain of the boxing team. Bolick began attending Presbyterian College in 1931, where he was a member of the Pi Kappa Alpha fraternity, after graduating from North Charleston. He started playing on the boxing team as a freshman, and became as a sophomore "one of the leading light heavyweights of the South Carolina collegiate boxing ranks."

Bolick in 1932 made the varsity football team as a starter as a back. In the second quarter of their game against Wofford that year, he ran for a 70-yard touchdown in the win. By November 21, 1932, he had taken the state lead in scoring with nine touchdowns. He finished the season as the state's leading scorer with 54 total points. Bolick also placed third in voting for the Jacobs Blocking Trophy, given to the best blocker in the state and described as "probably the highest individual award a South Carolina football player may receive."

During the early 1933 boxing season, Bolick was described by a sportswriter for The State as "one of the best boxers developed in this state in many a day. He has everything necessary for a colorful and effective fighter–confidence, natural ability, scientific offense and defense, [and] a two-handed attack." By February 1933, he had won all but two matches of his boxing career, one of which was the Southeastern A. A. U. tournament finals and the other by decision against Willard of South Carolina, but became ineligible due to failing to "win a decision in the class room." While ineligible, he refereed his team's fights.

Following the 1933 boxing season, Bolick was elected the team captain for 1934. The Greenville News stated that he "is a hard worker, trains all the time and is liked by the boys. He will make a fine leader." Also making the varsity teams in baseball and basketball, he became the first four-letter athlete in school history. In baseball, his position was first baseman. During the 1933 football season, he became Presbyterian's main blocking back and did not see much action as a runner, attributed to added weight and the fact that they already had several good ball carriers. Bolick also played on defense, and was described as one of "the strongest men defensively," being "one of the greatest factors" in the team's success. At the end of the year, he was named Presbyterian's best overall athlete and was elected team football captain for his senior year.

Bolick changed his position in baseball to pitcher for the 1934 season. He won an intercollegiate championship in boxing. In football, during his senior year, Bolick remained in the blocking back/fullback position and became one of the best college players in the role. An article from The Greenville News said the following about him: "Captain Harry Bolick, Presbyterian's rip-snorting fullback, has been outstanding all season in his unselfish but rugged contribution to the [Presbyterian] cause. His blocking on running plays, sharp and incisive, seldom failed to take out a man or two and some times three tacklers. Protection he has given P. C.'s forward passers and kickers was all that could be desired. Coach Walter Johnson couldn't have built an iron fence for a better safeguard than Bolick shielded Perrin when the latter faded back to pass or punt against Wofford Saturday."

At the end of the season, Bolick was named the winner of the prestigious Jacobs Blocking Trophy by vote of the state's sportswriters and coaches. He was also selected first-team All-State. His blocking was described in a news report as such consistently good that its "seldom seen on any gridiron," and he was said to be "just what every coach would like to have but seldom gets." Bolick was part of the graduating class of 1935.

== Coaching career ==
After graduating from Presbyterian, Bolick accepted a position as multi-sport coach at High Point High School in July 1935. He served as head football coach, head boxing coach, head basketball coach, and led the latter to the championship of both Carolinas in 1936–37. Bolick left for Lake View High School in 1938. He coached and oversaw all athletics there, leading the football team to the Class B championship in his only year. He led the team to a 10–1–1 record and won 7–6 in the championship.

Bolick became the assistant football coach at Gaffney High School in 1939. He also played for and managed the Gaffney Manufacturing Company Red Sox baseball team in 1940. He left Gaffney High School to become principal at Johns Island High School in 1941. Bolick remained in this position until leaving for the United States Army in 1942. While a lieutenant in the army, he was the athletic and recreation officer for the Third Infantry Regiment of The Infantry School Troops Brigade.

After being discharged as a captain in 1946, he was named athletic director, baseball coach, basketball coach, and football coach at Erskine College, which was resuming its athletic program after having dropped it at the start of the war. The team had also thrown out almost all football equipment when it dropped the program, leaving only one jersey, a few shoulder pads, and several balls for Bolick when he assumed the job, meaning he had to get all the equipment and recruit all the players for his team. As a result, the football team compiled a disastrous 0–9 record, after which Bolick resigned, although he finished coaching the remaining sports for the 1946–47 season.

Bolick was a coach at Seneca High School for the 1947 season. The following year, he began coaching at Ford High School in Laurens, South Carolina. He continued coaching and served as a teacher at high schools until 1966.

== Personal life and death ==
Bolick was a member of the Boy Scouts of America, and was given the Silver Beaver Award. He served in World War II, being ranked captain in the United States Army. He also taught at European military schools for 20 years. Bolick was married to Elizabeth Todd (Bole) and was a member of the Providence A. R. P. Church. He died in Clinton, South Carolina, on November 21, 1999, at the age of 87.

== Head coaching record ==
=== College football ===
Year	Team	Overall	Conference	Standing	Bowl/playoffs
Erskine Flying Fleet (South Carolina Little Four) (1946)
1946	Erskine	0–9	0–3		
Erskine:		0–9	0–3		
Total:		0–9			
