= Newton-Conover City Schools =

School district in Catawba County, North Carolina

Newton-Conover City Schools is a school district located in Catawba County, North Carolina. It includes the majorities of the cities of Newton and Conover, as well as some unincorporated areas.

As of 2021 the district schools has a total of around 2,888 students on roll, and 188 teachers.

== Schools ==
The Newton-Conover school system is made up of seven schools:

=== Elementary schools ===
- Shuford Elementary School
- North Newton Elementary School
- South Newton Elementary
- Conover School

=== Middle schools ===
- Newton-Conover Middle School

=== High schools ===
- Newton-Conover High School
- Discovery High School of Newton-Conover
