= Robert Kearns (musician) =

American bassist

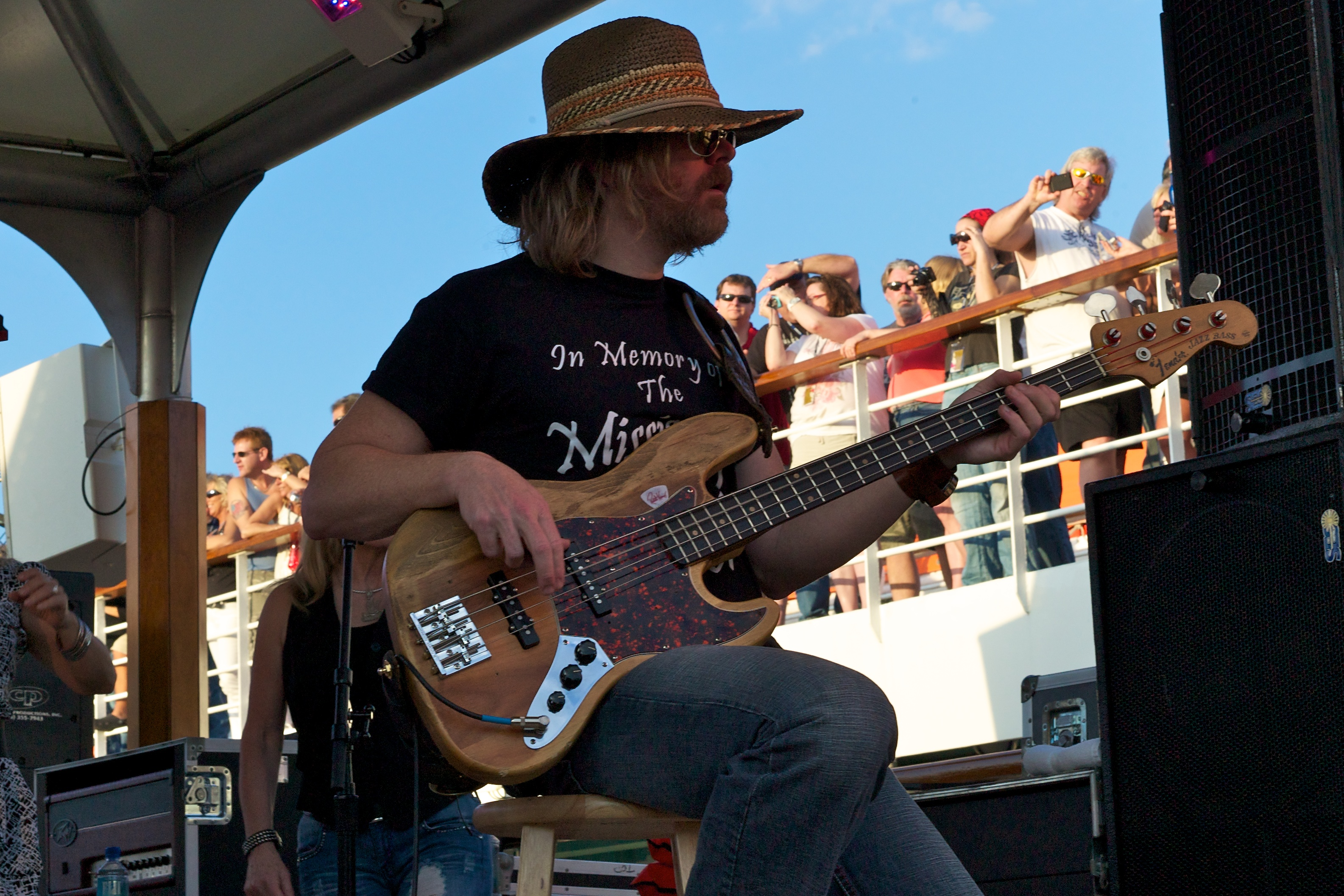
Kearns in 2011

Robert Kearns is an American bassist who has played with several notable bands. He is from Conover, North Carolina.

== Biography ==
Kearns was a founding member of Cry of Love from 1989 to 1997 and went on to join The Bottle Rockets from 1998 to 2005. In 2009, he was named as the touring substitute bassist for a cancer-stricken Ean Evans in Lynyrd Skynyrd. Evans subsequently died and was permanently replaced by Kearns (2009–2012). Kearns later formed Big Hat with friends Peter Stroud, Audley Freed, Keith Gattis and Fred Eltringham. Kearns left Lynyrd Skynyrd when Big Hat got the opportunity to play with Sheryl Crow, where Kearns acted as bass player and backup singer.

In addition to his work with these artists, Kearns has toured or recorded with Bobby Keys, Chris Duarte, Jack Ingram, Todd Snider, Alvin Youngblood Hart, Jesse Dayton, Sisters Morales, Bonnie Bishop, Chris Cagle, Hays Carll and Edwin McCain.

Kearns appears in the TV series Front and Center, a critically acclaimed concert series that debuted in 2012. He appears in the episode about Sheryl Crow, that came out in 2018.
