= Newton, North Carolina =

- City
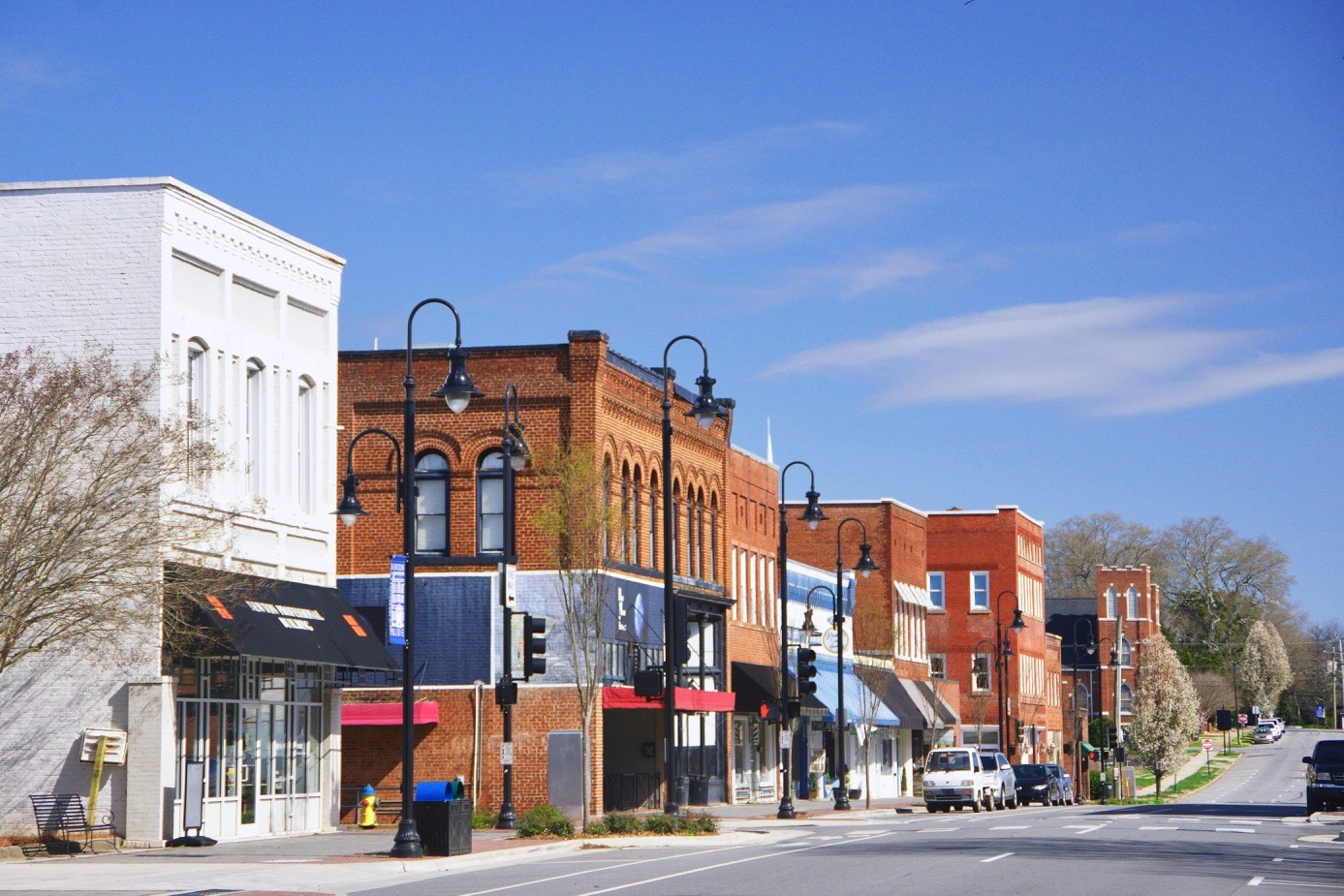
- Main Street (NC 16)

- Seal Icon
- Motto: "The Heart of Catawba County"
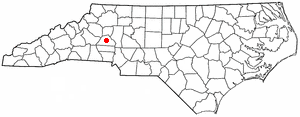
- Location of Newton, North Carolina
- Coordinates: 35°39′47″N 81°14′00″W
- Country: United States
- State: North Carolina
- County: Catawba

Area
  - Total: 13.85 sq mi (35.87 km^{2})
  - Land: 13.80 sq mi (35.73 km^{2})
  - Water: 0.054 sq mi (0.14 km^{2})
- Elevation: 935 ft (285 m)

Population (2020)
  - Total: 13,148
  - Density: 953.1/sq mi (367.98/km^{2})
- Time zone: UTC−5 (Eastern (EST))
  - Summer (DST): UTC−4 (EDT)
- ZIP code: 28658
- Area code: 828
- FIPS code: 37-47000
- GNIS feature ID: 2404377
- Website: www.newtonnc.gov

Newton is a city in Catawba County, North Carolina, United States. As of the 2020 census, Newton had a population of 13,148. It is the county seat of Catawba County. Newton is part of the Hickory–Lenoir–Morganton Metropolitan Statistical Area.

== History ==
Newton was established in 1845 and incorporated in 1855.

== Geography ==
Newton is located at the center of Catawba County. It is bordered to the north by Conover and to the northwest by Hickory. Claremont is to the northeast, and Maiden is to the south.

According to the United States Census Bureau, the city has a total area of 13.8 square miles (35.8 km^{2}), of which 13.8 square miles (35.7 km^{2}) is land and 0.04 square miles (0.1 km^{2}), or 0.37%, is water.

== Demographics ==
Historical population
Census	Pop.	Note	%±
1850	84		—
1860	291		246.4%
1870	323		11.0%
1880	583		80.5%
1890	1,038		78.0%
1900	1,583		52.5%
1910	2,316		46.3%
1920	3,021		30.4%
1930	4,394		45.4%
1940	5,407		23.1%
1950	6,039		11.7%
1960	6,658		10.3%
1970	7,857		18.0%
1980	7,624		−3.0%
1990	9,304		22.0%
2000	12,560		35.0%
2010	12,968		3.2%
2020	13,148		1.4%
2025 (est.)	13,822	▲	5.1%
U.S. Decennial Census

=== 2020 census ===
As of the 2020 census, Newton had a population of 13,148. The median age was 40.5 years. 21.7% of residents were under the age of 18 and 19.0% of residents were 65 years of age or older. For every 100 females there were 92.8 males, and for every 100 females age 18 and over there were 91.0 males age 18 and over.

94.5% of residents lived in urban areas, while 5.5% lived in rural areas.

There were 5,294 households in Newton, of which 30.1% had children under the age of 18 living in them. Of all households, 39.4% were married-couple households, 19.6% were households with a male householder and no spouse or partner present, and 32.6% were households with a female householder and no spouse or partner present. About 30.7% of all households were made up of individuals and 14.0% had someone living alone who was 65 years of age or older. The city also had 3,332 families.

There were 5,776 housing units, of which 8.3% were vacant. The homeowner vacancy rate was 2.4% and the rental vacancy rate was 6.7%.

Newton racial composition
Race	Number	Percentage
White (non-Hispanic)	8,365	63.62%
Black or African American (non-Hispanic)	1,488	11.32%
Native American	37	0.28%
Asian	559	4.25%
Pacific Islander	2	0.02%
Other/Mixed	625	4.75%
Hispanic or Latino	2,072	15.76%

=== 2000 census ===
As of the census of 2000, there were 12,560 people, 5,007 households, and 3,314 families living in the city. The population density was 968.4 inhabitants per square mile (373.9/km^{2}). There were 5,368 housing units at an average density of 413.9 per square mile (159.8/km^{2}). The racial composition of the city was: 77.58% White, 12.33% Black or African American, 9.52% Hispanic or Latino American, 3.40% Asian American, 0.43% Native American, 0.03% Native Hawaiian or Other Pacific Islander, 4.63% some other race, and 1.60% two or more races.

There were 5,007 households, out of which 29.4% had children under the age of 18 living with them, 47.2% were married couples living together, 14.4% had a female householder with no husband present, and 33.8% were non-families. 28.8% of all households were made up of individuals, and 13.6% had someone living alone who was 65 years of age or older. The average household size was 2.46 and the average family size was 3.00.

In the city, the population was spread out, with 23.8% under the age of 18, 8.8% from 18 to 24, 29.3% from 25 to 44, 21.4% from 45 to 64, and 16.8% who were 65 years of age or older. The median age was 37 years. For every 100 females, there were 91.8 males. For every 100 females age 18 and over, there were 88.6 males.

The median income for a household in the city was $36,696, and the median income for a family was $44,330. Males had a median income of $27,237 versus $22,963 for females. The per capita income for the city was $18,427. 12.1% of the population and 8.4% of families were below the poverty line. Out of the total population, 19.1% of those under the age of 18 and 13.2% of those 65 and older were living below the poverty line.

== Places of interest ==
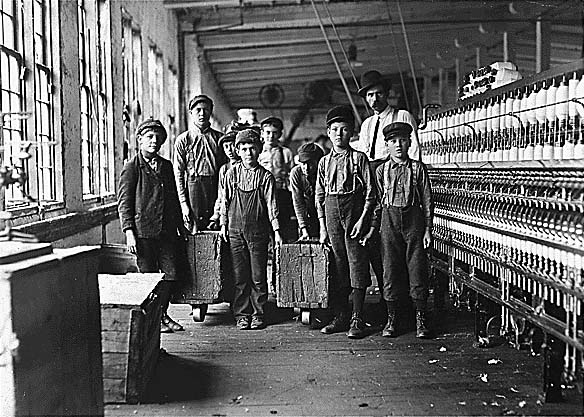
Some of the bobbin doffers and the superintendent at Catawba Cotton Mill, December 1908. Photographed by Lewis Hine.

Listings on the National Register of Historic Places for places in Newton, North Carolina:

- Bost-Burris House
- Catawba County Courthouse, a 1924 courthouse by architects Willard G. Rogers and J.J. Stout, which now houses the Catawba County Museum of History
- Foil–Cline House, also called the John A. Foil House, an 1883 domestic dwelling
- Grace Reformed Church, a historic church built in 1887 in the Gothic Revival style
- Long, McCorkle and Murray Houses, 1890 houses in the Craftsman and Queen Anne architectural styles
- Newton Downtown Historic District
- North Main Avenue Historic District
- Perkins House
- Rudisill–Wilson House
- Self–Trott–Bickett House
- St. Paul's Church and Cemetery, a log weatherboarded church built in 1808 featuring a federal style interior

== Education ==
The majority of the city is in the Newton-Conover City Schools. Other portions are in the Catawba County Schools school district. The former district operates Newton-Conover High School, the comprehensive high school for the entire district, and Discovery High School of Newton-Conover, an alternative high school.

== Notable people ==
- Tori Amos – singer-songwriter and pianist
- Cherie Berry – politician and former North Carolina Commissioner of Labor
- Glenn Buff – American architect
- Rashad Coulter – MMA fighter
- Bobby Hicks – bluegrass fiddler and musician
- Shane Lee – NASCAR driver
- Brock Long – emergency manager who served as the Administrator of the Federal Emergency Management Agency (FEMA)
- Cecile Brawley Long – President General of the United Daughters of the Confederacy
- Buz Phillips – former MLB player for the Philadelphia Phillies
- Jerry Punch – auto racing and college football commentator for ESPN
- Dennis Setzer – former NASCAR driver
- Clarence O. Sherrill – lieutenant colonel in World War I and military aide to Presidents Warren G. Harding and Calvin Coolidge
- Alonzo C. Shuford – U.S. Representative from North Carolina
- Wilson Warlick – former United States federal judge
- Eddie Yount – former MLB player for the Philadelphia Athletics and Pittsburgh Pirates

== Media ==
- The Observer News Enterprise, daily newspaper reporting local news and sports for Newton, Conover and the surrounding communities since 1879
- Outlook, weekly entertainment and activity guide distributed in Newton, Conover and Hickory
- The Claremont Courier, free monthly publication
