= Face jug =

Type of jug pottery

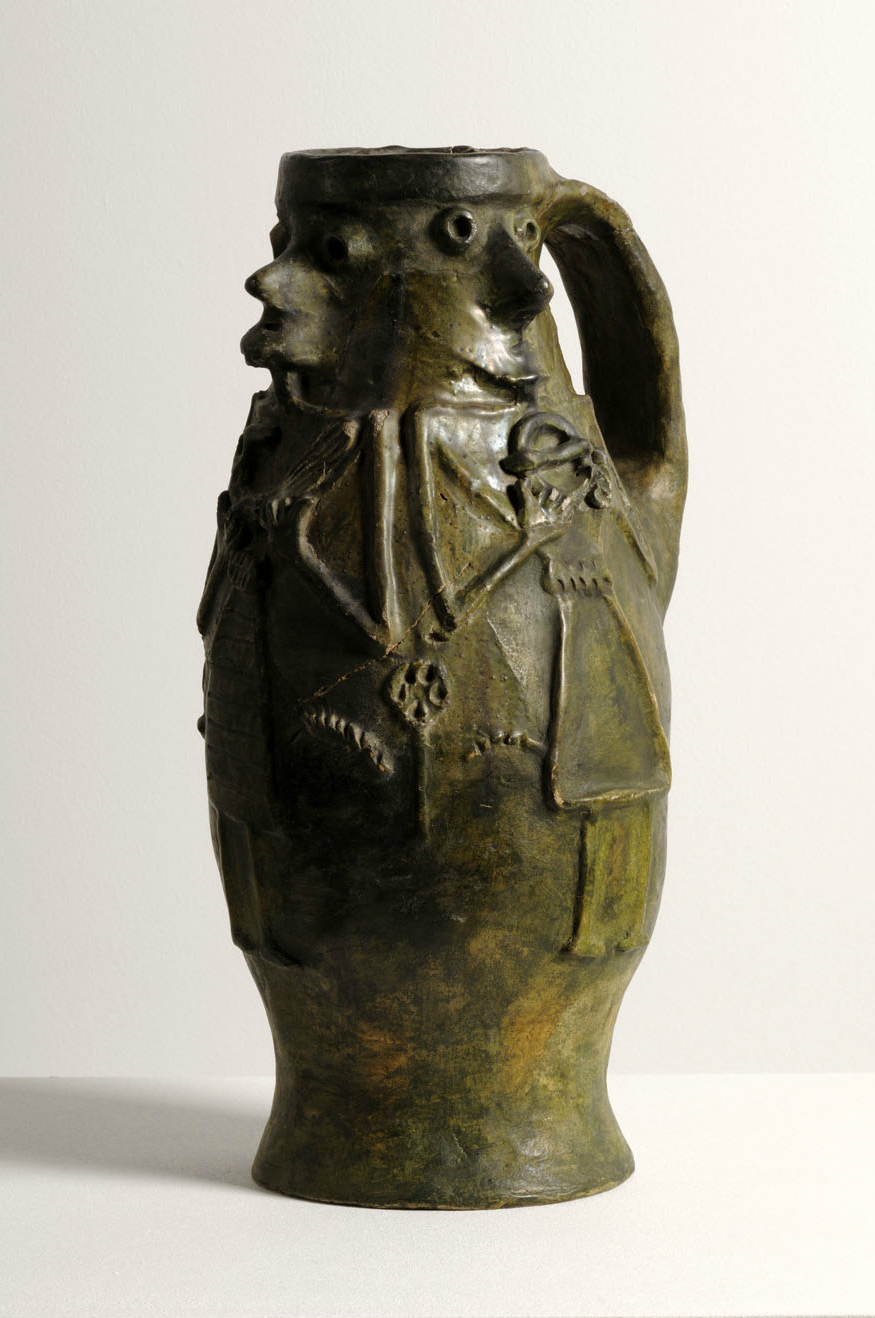
The Coventry Face Jug, unearthed beside the site of the local Benedictine priory. Herbert Art Gallery and Museum, Coventry.

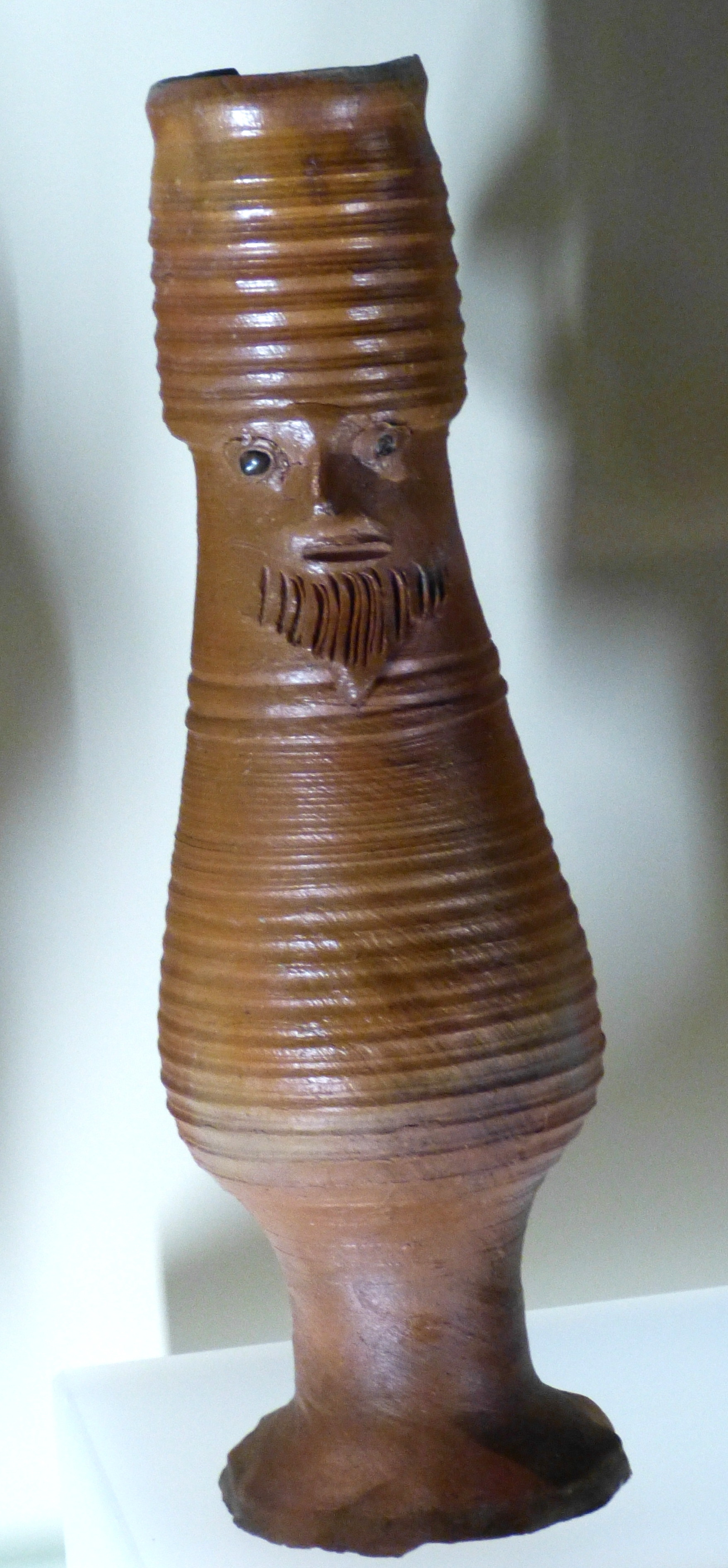
Medieval German face jug

A face jug is a jug pottery that depicts a face. There are examples in the pottery of ancient Greece, and that of Pre-Columbian America. Early European examples date from the 13th century, and the German stoneware Bartmann jug was a popular later medieval and Renaissance form. Later, the British Toby Jug was a popular form, that became mass-produced. Especially in America, a number of modern craft potters make pieces, mostly continuing the 19th-century African-American slave folk art tradition.

The Jug in the Form of a Head, Self-Portrait (1899) by Paul Gauguin is a rare fine art example.

== Early forms ==
=== England ===
During the 13th century, craftsmen outside of London became more decorative in their style, creating more anthropomorphic vessels that would characterize medieval face jugs. In the 1600s full-body vessels supposedly modeled after Edward Vernon, also known as Admiral Vernon. These pieces came to be known as British Toby Jugs.

=== Africa ===
African Nkisi figures, originating in Central Africa, were considered containers of both deceased souls and spiritual medicine. These figures were made with many different materials including clay. They came to the Americas via enslaved Africans, and are found more commonly in Latin American regions. The vessels are full figured pieces characterized by the same exaggerated human features often seen on African-American face jugs. Many rituals associated with Nkisi figures are used either to aid or to harm a person or other living creature that the figures play a stand-in role for, or as an extension of a spiritual leader, or as a being that stores spiritual energy.

=== America ===
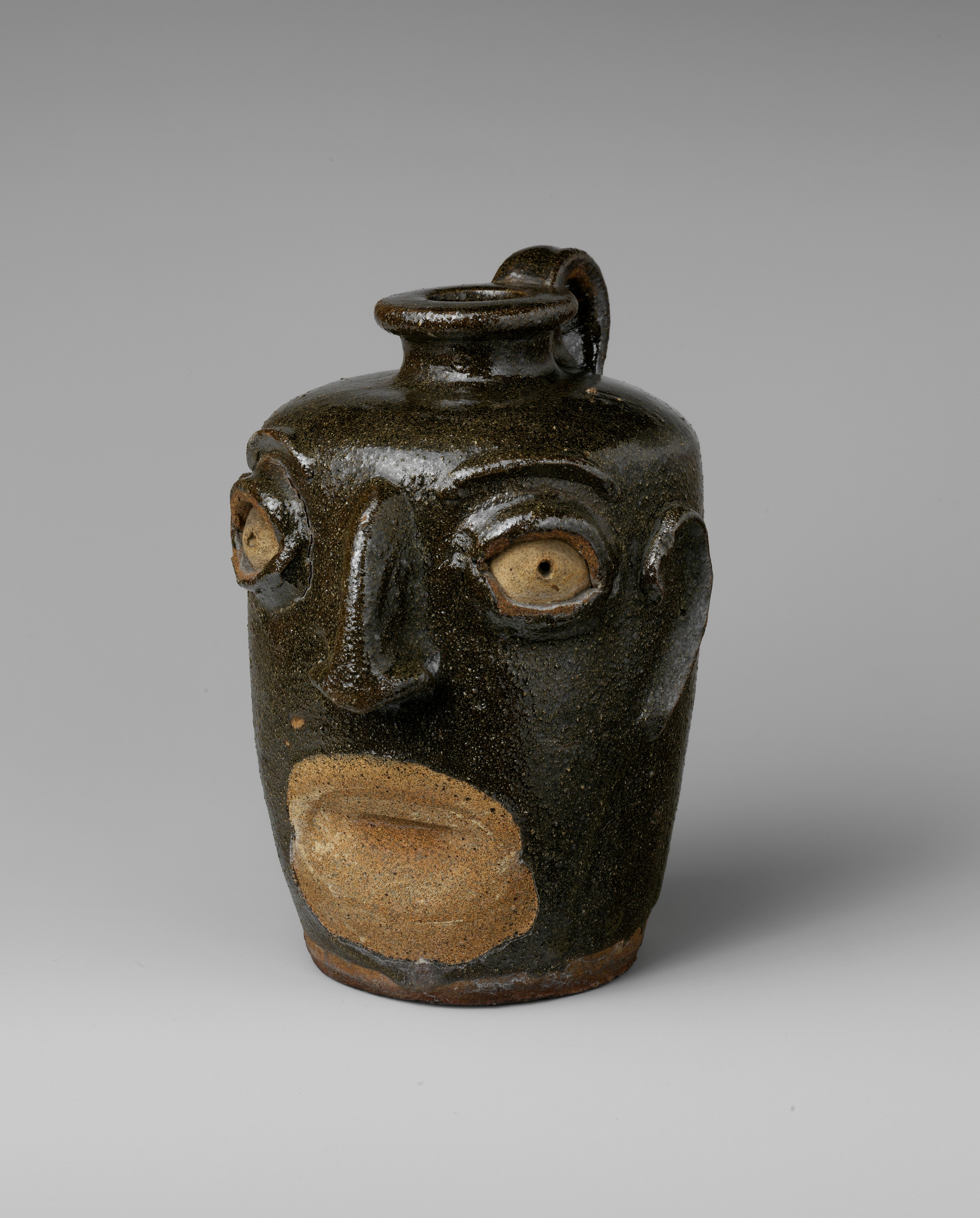
An example of an African-American face jug from Edgefield District of South Carolina.

Some of the best-known vessels come from North Carolina, South Carolina and Georgia, made by African-American slaves in the mid-1800s. Though the jugs' exact purposes are unknown, many scholars believe they have either practical or spiritual value. Other names associated with African-American face jugs are grotesque jars, monkey jars, or face jars. Modern interpretations started appearing in the same regions during the 1940s. The making of face jugs among African Americans may have been influenced by Kongo creation of face jugs because face jugs made by Black Americans are somewhat similar in appearance to Kongo face jugs from Central Africa. Archeologists interpreted the face jugs (face vessels) bulging white eyes to be a Bakongo practice of using white to symbolize the spirit world that are similar to nkisi nkondi in Central Africa.

Face jugs were fully functional pieces that served the practical purpose of holding and pouring liquid. Various slave owner accounts hold that African-American slaves would use their face jugs to carry water into the fields with them. Other scholars believe that face jugs were used as a form of self-identification, or a self-portrait and perhaps were a way for slaves to deal with their physical displacement and loss of visual worth. Some folklore accounts held that these jugs were used for spiritual, rather than practical, purposes. It is believed that the jugs were buried outside of front and back doors to scare spirits away. It is also claimed that these jugs were used as grave markers and placed atop burial sites surrounded with the possessions of the deceased.

As folk art, face jugs have become a significant feature in the history of African-American art. Because formal ceramic skills to create face jugs were taught after America gained its independence, they are regarded as some of the first truly American pieces. Because of their interesting physical characteristics and historical context behind them, face jugs are important examples of African-American art and as the start of a theme of self-identification that would carry into the future. Some use these vessels may have been as political symbols. Most famously, it is believed that Dave the Potter, a slave who worked in the Miles mill where face jugs were made, was himself protesting against his status through ceramic pieces.

== List of American makers ==
American art potters who create face jugs include:

- Georgia Blizzard
- Burlon Craig
- Jerry Dolyn Brown
- Lanier Meaders
- Clayton Bailey
- Jim McDowell

== List of Latgalian makers ==
- Ādams Kāpostiņš

== See also ==
- Bartmann jug
- Nkisi
- Toby Jug
