= Hickory Museum of Art =

Art museum in North Carolina

Coordinates: 35.7361°N 81.3341°W

- Established: February 4, 1944
- Location: 243 Third Avenue NE Hickory, NC 28601
- Director: Clarissa Starnes
- Website: hickoryart.org

Hickory Museum of Art (HMA) is an art museum in Hickory, North Carolina which holds exhibitions, events, and public educational programs based on a permanent collection of 19th to 21st century American art. The museum also features a long-term exhibition of Southern contemporary folk art, showcasing the work of self-taught artists from around the region. North Carolina's second-oldest museum, Hickory Museum of Art was established in 1944.

== National accreditation ==
Hickory Museum of Art first earned national accreditation from the American Alliance of Museums in 1991. Following a meeting held October 6–8, 2014, The American Alliance of Museums announced that Hickory Museum of Art was one of nine museums which had earned re-accreditation. Accredited status from the Alliance is the highest national recognition achievable by an American museum. Of the nation's estimated 35,000 museums, 1,033 are currently accredited. To earn accreditation a museum first must conduct a year of self-study, and is then visited by a two-person inspection team reporting to the Accreditation Commission — a body of museum professionals appointed by the A.A.M. board.

== History ==
In the early 1940s, Hickory, then a city of c. 15,000 inhabitants, was a leading regional cultural center. Founding Director Paul Whitener felt the city needed a visual arts center. With funding from local industrialist A. Alex Shuford Jr., Whitener organized a committee of citizens in September 1943 to discuss organizing an art association. In November of that year, though it did not yet have either a collection or a physical location, the Hickory Museum of Art Association held its first exhibition, of art borrowed locally, in the vacant Bradshaw office building in downtown Hickory, attracting about 600 viewers. In February 1944 North Carolina Governor Clyde Hoey officially recognized and chartered the Association at a ceremony in the ballroom of the Old Hickory Hotel. (Charlotte's 1936 Mint Museum was the first.) Hickory Museum of Art was formally dedicated four months later, and Paul Whitener unanimously appointed Director.

=== Location ===
Within a year of its founding the Museum of Art had acquired a dozen paintings and moved into the white clapboard W.W. Bryan house on Hickory's Third Avenue, its home for the next 14 years. From 1960 the museum occupied the former office building of Shuford Mills on the corner of 3rd Street and 1st Avenue NW. Here it was able to further develop its programs, including the art classes that had been initiated at the Third Avenue premises, and to expand its long-standing annual School Art Show.

By 1984 the museum was again in need of larger quarters, and to that end had raised $650,000. Buck Shuford, of the Shuford family which has been supporters of the museum since its beginnings, led a campaign to turn the redundant Hickory High School building (formerly Claremont High School) into an arts center, spearheading a drive that raised $2.6m toward its acquisition and conversion. Two years later the renovated building opened as the Arts & Science Center of Catawba Valley, providing a new permanent location for the Museum. Today, it has been incorporated into the SALT Block, a cultural arts complex that houses the Catawba Science Center, Hickory Choral Society, Hickory Museum of Art, Patrick Beaver Library, United Arts Council, and Western Piedmont Symphony.

== Permanent collection ==
Industrialist A. Alex Shuford Jr. volunteered the funds for the first purchase of a painting in March 1944, for $140: Burke Mountain, Vermont, by National Academy of Design officer Frederick Ballard Williams. The collection grew rapidly over the following years. Whitener, using his artistic contacts in New York City, among whom were the painters Wilford Conrow and Henry Hobart Nichols, concentrated on acquiring affordable American art. A number of New York artists, including Whitener's friend Conrow, spent summers in the mountains of North Carolina and took an interest in the museum, with some donating their work. In 1954, the museum acquired a group of important works from the collection of National Academy of Design president Hobart Nichols including pieces by Thomas Cole, Asher Brown Durand, John Frederick Kensett, Worthington Whittredge, Edward Henry Potthast, and Robert Lewis Reid.

Today, the museum's permanent collection includes approximately 1,500 art objects, ranging from Hudson River School paintings, American art pottery, Glass Art, High-Speed Photography, and the work of regional artists.

Whitener's stated aim was that the museum should "embrace all the arts and crafts of the upper Piedmont region of North Carolina." and it also recognizes the folk artistic traditions (also known as "Outsider Art") of the Southern United States, North Carolina, and the Catawba Valley region in a long-term folk art exhibition to which the third floor of the building is dedicated. In 2004, the museum acquired more than 150 contemporary Southern folk art objects from the collection of Hickory residents Allen and Barry Huffman. This was the largest collection ever received by the museum, and has expanded considerably in subsequent years. The artists represented, integral to the region's social history, are typically self-taught and removed from the mainstream art world. They include James Harold Jennings, Richard Burnside, Miles Carpenter, Raymond Coins, Abraham Lincoln Criss, Minnie Adkins, Howard Finster, Russell Gillespie, and Minnie Reinhardt. Traditional Catawba Valley Pottery, including a number of iconic "face jugs", is also represented.

Selections from the Permanent Collection
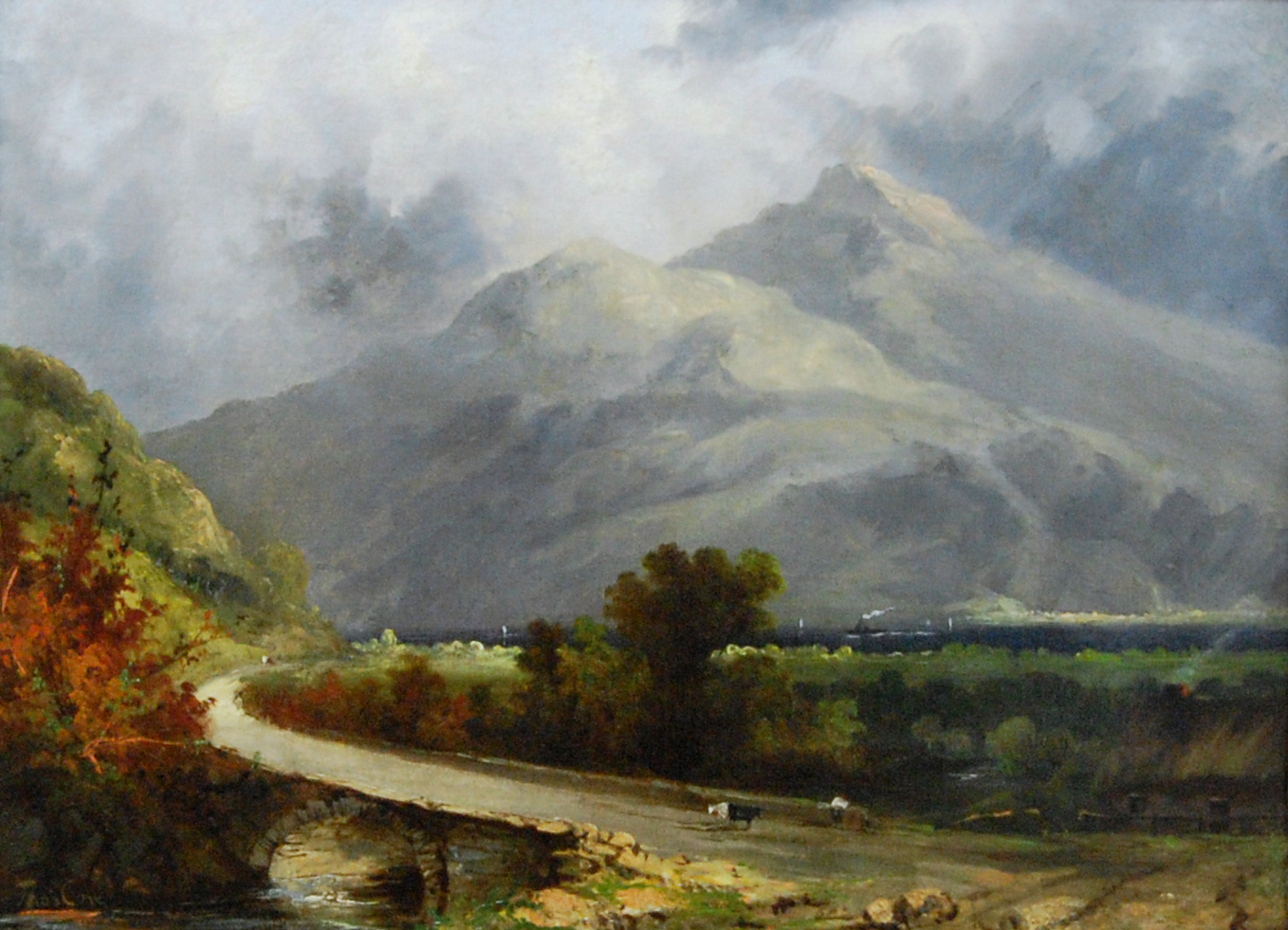
Attributed to Thomas Cole, Landscape

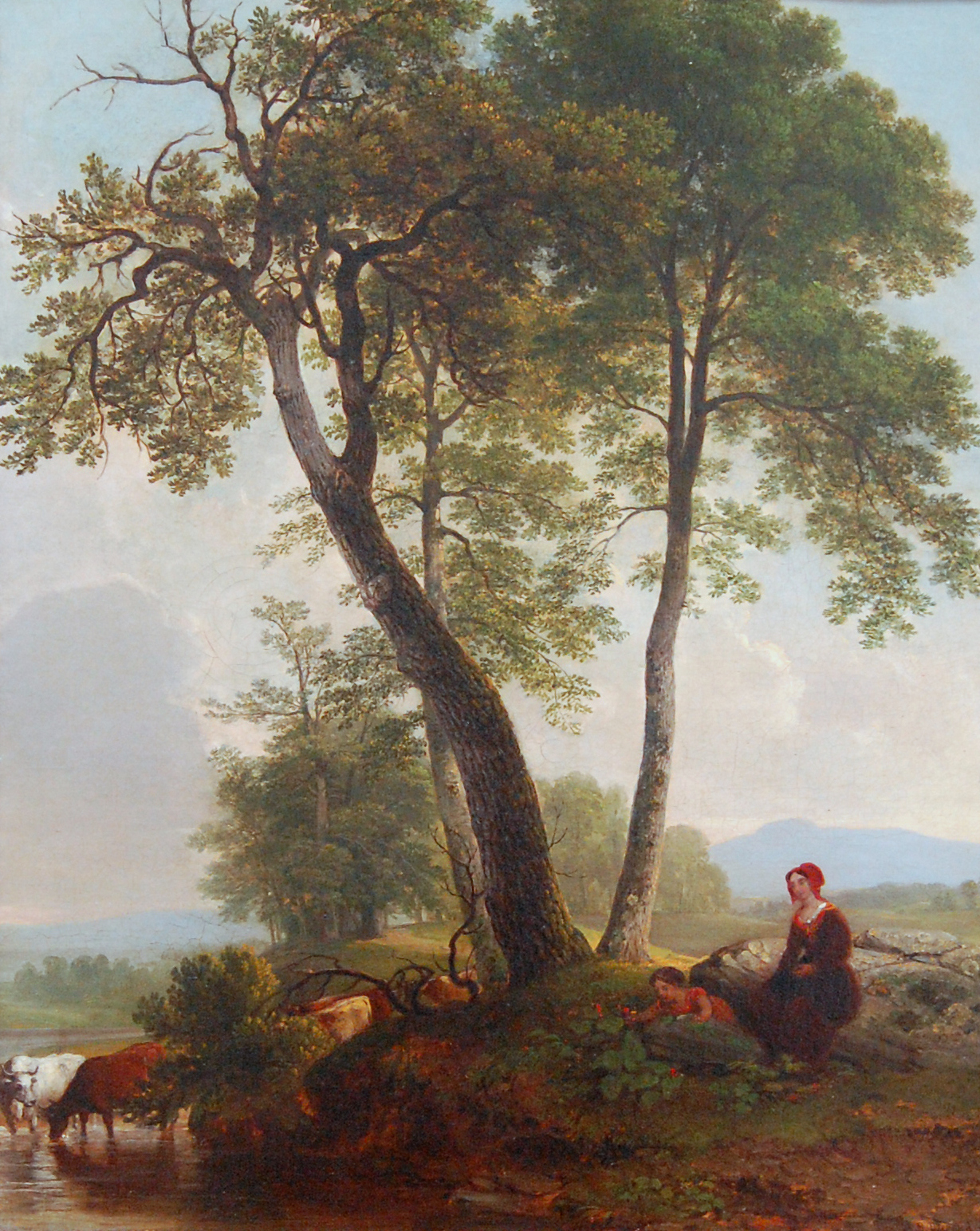
Asher Brown Durand, Pastoral Scene

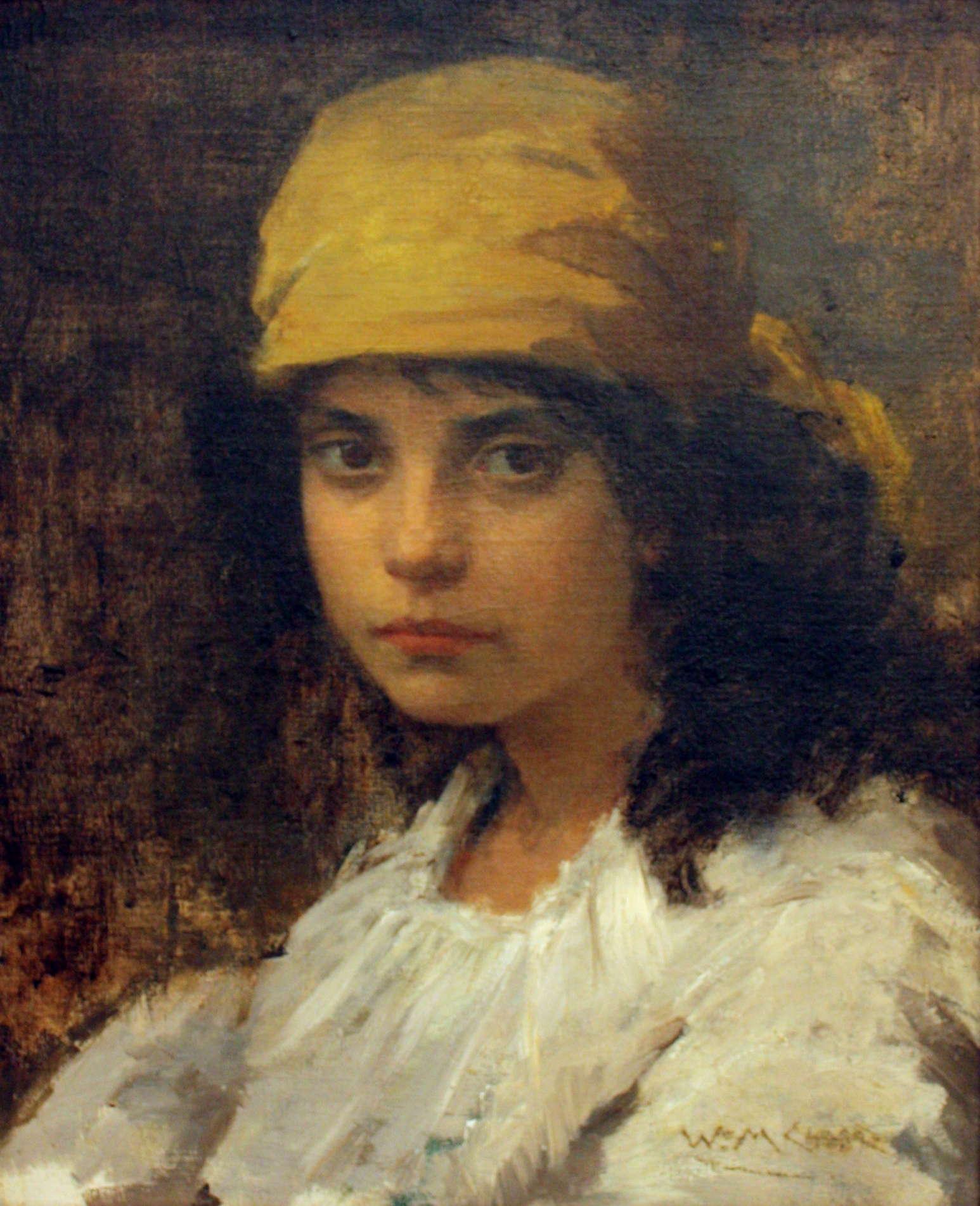
William Merritt Chase, Portrait of a Young Woman
