= American Artists Professional League =

Fine arts nonprofit organization

The American Artists Professional League (AAPL) is an American fine art organization, established in New York City in 1928 by a group of painters, illustrators and sculptors. The AAPL is a nonprofit organization promoting traditional Realism in American fine art. The organization's headquarters are at the Salmagundi Art Club in New York, where it had its first meeting on January 29, 1928, with Frederick Ballard Williams becoming the organization's national chairman. The AAPL today is a curated group of over 600 American Realists. For 96 years, it has hosted an annual Grand National Exhibition to promote artists specializing in realist art forms.

== History ==
F. Ballard Williams, assistant treasurer of the National Academy and former president of the Salmagundi Club, both based in New York City, perceived the need for a national organization to support the growing interest in art in other cities and regions of the United States. The organization's stated objective is to be "A national organization of American artists and art lovers, working positively and impartially for contemporary and modern American art and artists.".

On January 29, 1928, he called a meeting of 15 members of the Salmagundi Club to discuss forming a professional league of American artists. The majority attending were academicians such as Hobart Nichols, and Bruce Crane. The American Artists Professional League was instituted at that meeting, with Williams as president, Wilford Conrow as secretary, and Gordon Grant as treasurer.

Other member artists who have served as officers, board members, or chapter chairs of the AAPL include Dean Cornwell, Lionel Barrymore, Harvey Dunn, Rockwell Kent, Frederic Whitaker, A.C. Pelikan of the Milwaukee Art Institute, and Theodore H. Pond of the Akron Art Institute. Other prominent past members include Elizabeth Okie Paxton, Edgar Alwin Payne, Andrew Wyeth, and Henriette Wyeth.

The first issues taken up by the league were the inferior quality of manufacturing of artists' paint and obtaining commissions of official portraits by U.S. artists, as many commissions for official portraits in Washington D.C. were awarded to European painters. Albert T. Reid had connections amongst legislators in Washington, D.C., and persuaded a California Senator to attach a rider to a congressional bill, stipulating that all official portraits were to be painted by U.S. artists.

Through the efforts of Wilford Conrow, a specialist in the chemical and physical purity of pigments, funding was obtained from the Carnegie Corporation Endowment Fund for a program of color pigment research. Dr. Martin Fischer undertook the investigation, which was completed in 1932 at the University of Cincinnati, establishing the AAPL as the national authority on artists' pigments. The AAPL was also instrumental in securing the U.S. Bureau of Standards' original set of government-sponsored standards for artists' colors, which were subsequently updated in 1962. All major manufacturers of artists' paint followed AAPL standards, with each tube of paint stating: "Statement of contents as recommended by the American Artists Professional League".

Starting in 1931, the league produced lectures and films on classical fine art techniques, produced in partnership with New York University Institute of Fine Arts, Metropolitan Museum of Art and the Museum of Fine Arts, Boston.

From 1930 until 1951, the AAPL published a bi-weekly column in Art Digest magazine, devoted to solving problems for artists, publishing news about members, and other editorial comments and criticism. State chapters were organized during this period, with chapters in 20 states and membership of 3,000 across 47 of the 48 states. State chapters are no longer necessary due to modern communications and shipping.

The AAPL was one of many organizations that participated in the "Artists for Victory" group based in New York City from 1942–1946, formed by artists who wished to contribute to the war effort. Activities included a war poster competition, British-American goodwill exhibition, sponsoring of portrait drawings, demonstrations of arts and crafts, and instruction in military hospitals.

== Grand National Exhibition ==
The AAPL founded American Art Week in 1930, which was subsequently observed each year during the first week of November. Eleanor Roosevelt opened American Art Week in 1940, and President Dwight Eisenhower congratulated the AAPL via telegram in 1959. In 1953, American Art Week was renamed the Grand National Exhibition, to distinguish it from the government program of the same name. The national program was discontinued in the early 1970s due to rising costs and diminishing funds. The AAPL Grand National Exhibitions were originally for members only, held at the National Academy, the Salmagundi Club, and other locations such as the exhibition gallery of the Equitable Life Assurance Society, and the National Museum of Natural History in 1963. In the mid-1980s, the Grand National Exhibition returned to the Salmagundi Club, where it has been held since.

== Exhibits ==
Art exhibits sponsored by the AAPL have included the "Annual Exhibits of the Fine Arts and Crafts by Maryland Men and Women", held in Baltimore, Maryland, in 1938, and "Artists for victory", a MET exhibition of contemporary American art by Rockwell Kent, Andrew and Henriette Wyeth, and others in 1942.
