= Hart Square =

Collection of historic buildings in North Carolina

Hart Square Village
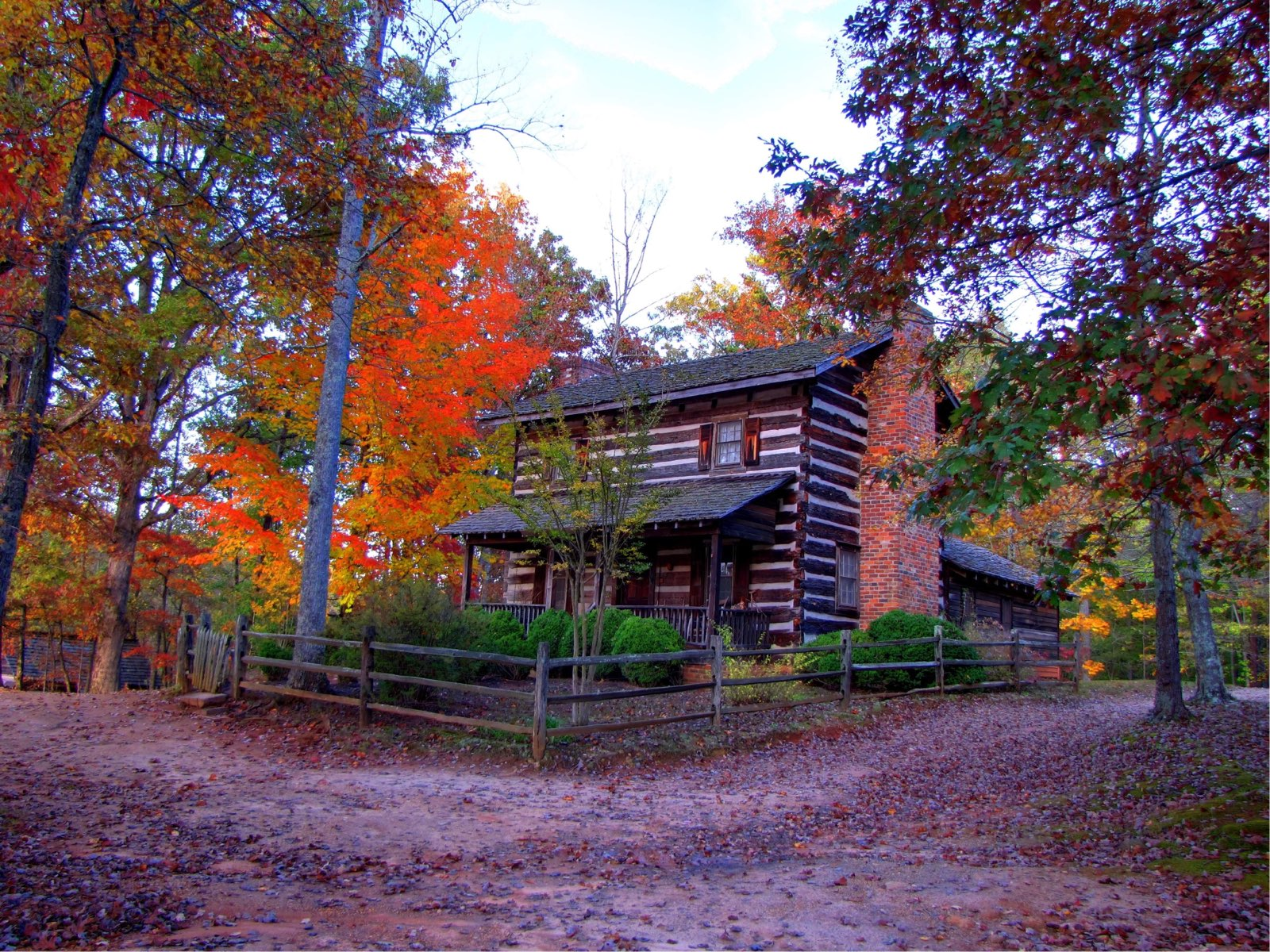
- Location: Vale, North Carolina
- Coordinates: 35°34′51″N 81°21′28″W
- Area: 200 acres
- Established: 1973
- Website: https://www.hartsquare.com/

Hart Square Village is a collection of 103 log cabins and buildings which have been preserved on 200 acres (81 ha) in Vale, North Carolina by Dr. Robert Hart III. This collection of historical structures is the largest in the United States with build dates ranging from 1760 to 1890. Buildings include barns, a tavern, a chapel, a schoolhouse and many others creating a unique village nestled around the lakes on the property. The majority of the buildings are from a 22 mile radius of the location, with the first cabin arriving in 1973. In 2017, Hart Square’s founder donated the property, collection of log structures, and artifacts within those structures to the nonprofit organization, Hart Square Foundation. The mission of Hart Square Foundation is to preserve Hart Square Village and share traditional arts and trades. This is accomplished through providing a wide slate of folklife programming annually where the rich diversity of crafts, trades, and practices of the region are shared with the community.

== Events ==
In its existence, Hart Square has moved from being open to the public one-time per year to offering year-round mission driven programming that focuses on the preservation of historic craft in modern context. “Step back in time” community events are volunteer driven, with hundreds of craftspeople demonstrating and sharing traditional arts and trades. In addition to community events that focus on preserving cultural heritage, a diverse slate of offerings is compiled annually for our Youth Education and Folkways Programming.

The Folkways Program preserves endangered arts and trades through intimate, small group instruction. Classes and workshops focus on folklife, arts, tradition, and culture. Classes are taught by skilled artists and practitioners from across the region. Classes include crafts like hand-built pottery, bobbin lace making, natural dyeing, basket weaving, carving, gourd working, leather working, and more.

Hart Square’s Field Trip Programming emphasizes hands-on history immersion with a traditional arts focus. Custom seasonal experiences are offered, with students moving through a series of five rotations. Students experience a variety of subjects like hand-built pottery, blacksmithing, square dancing, and traditional Appalachian music. The seasons feature different rotations, learning opportunities, and hands-on experience with traditional arts, crafts, and trades.

Community events provide lifelong learning opportunities and exposure to cultural traditions. Opportunities include traditional dance, music, foodways, folklife films, and immersive “step back in time” folklife demonstrations.
