= Frederick Ballard Williams =

American painter

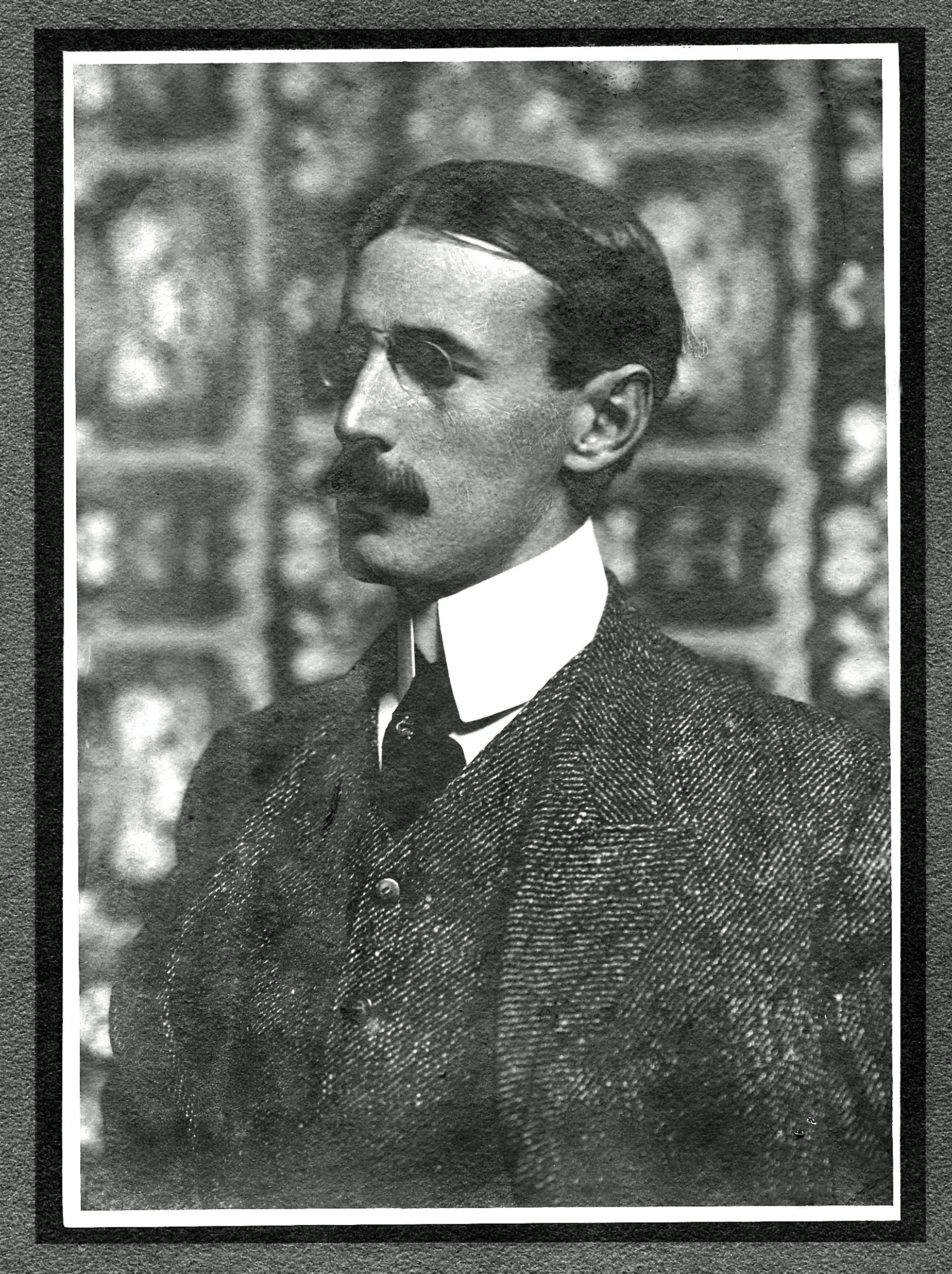
Portrait of Williams, c. 1900

Frederick Ballard Williams (1871- 1956) was an American landscape and figure painter. He is best known for his decorative and idyllic scenes of the New England landscape. As a member of the National Academy, Salmagundi Club president, and founder of the American Artists Professional League, Williams was an influential figure in the promotion of 20th-century art in America.

== Early life and education ==
The son of an artist, Frederick B. Williams was born in Brooklyn, New York in 1871. He was educated in the public schools of Bloomfield and Montclair, New Jersey, attending art classes at night at Cooper Union and at the New York Institute of Artists and Artisans. He also studied privately with artist John Ward Stimson, whose work likely influenced Williams’ celebrated fête galante paintings. Williams traveled briefly in England and France, supporting himself by teaching in private schools, before settling in Glen Ridge, New Jersey.

== Later life and work ==
In 1901, Williams had his first exhibition at the National Academy and won a bronze medal at the Pan-American Exposition in Buffalo, New York. His work was composed almost entirely of landscape paintings and of outdoor scenes peopled with idealized, elegantly-clad women. In 1910, he took a trip with painters Thomas Moran, Elliott Daingerfield, Douglas Parshall and Edward Henry Potthast to the Grand Canyon and other western sites. The result was an expansion of Williams' subject matter and a series of Californian landscapes. Williams carried out field studies of the landscapes that were the subjects of his work, but painted in his studio. He believed in the separation between art and its subject, and that an artist's idealistic vision could serve and augment his subject matter.

William's work is included in the permanent collections of the Los Angeles County Museum of Art, the Smithsonian American Art Museum, the Hickory Museum of Art, the Swope Art Museum, and the Milwaukee Art Museum. In 1944, William's Burke Mountain, Vermont was purchased for the Hickory Museum of Art, becoming the first painting in the museum's collection. He was the recipient of numerous awards and honors throughout his career, including the Isidor Gold Medal of the National Academy of Design in 1909.
