= Reinhardt-Craig House, Kiln and Pottery Shop =

Historic buildings in North Carolina, United States

- U.S. National Register of Historic Places
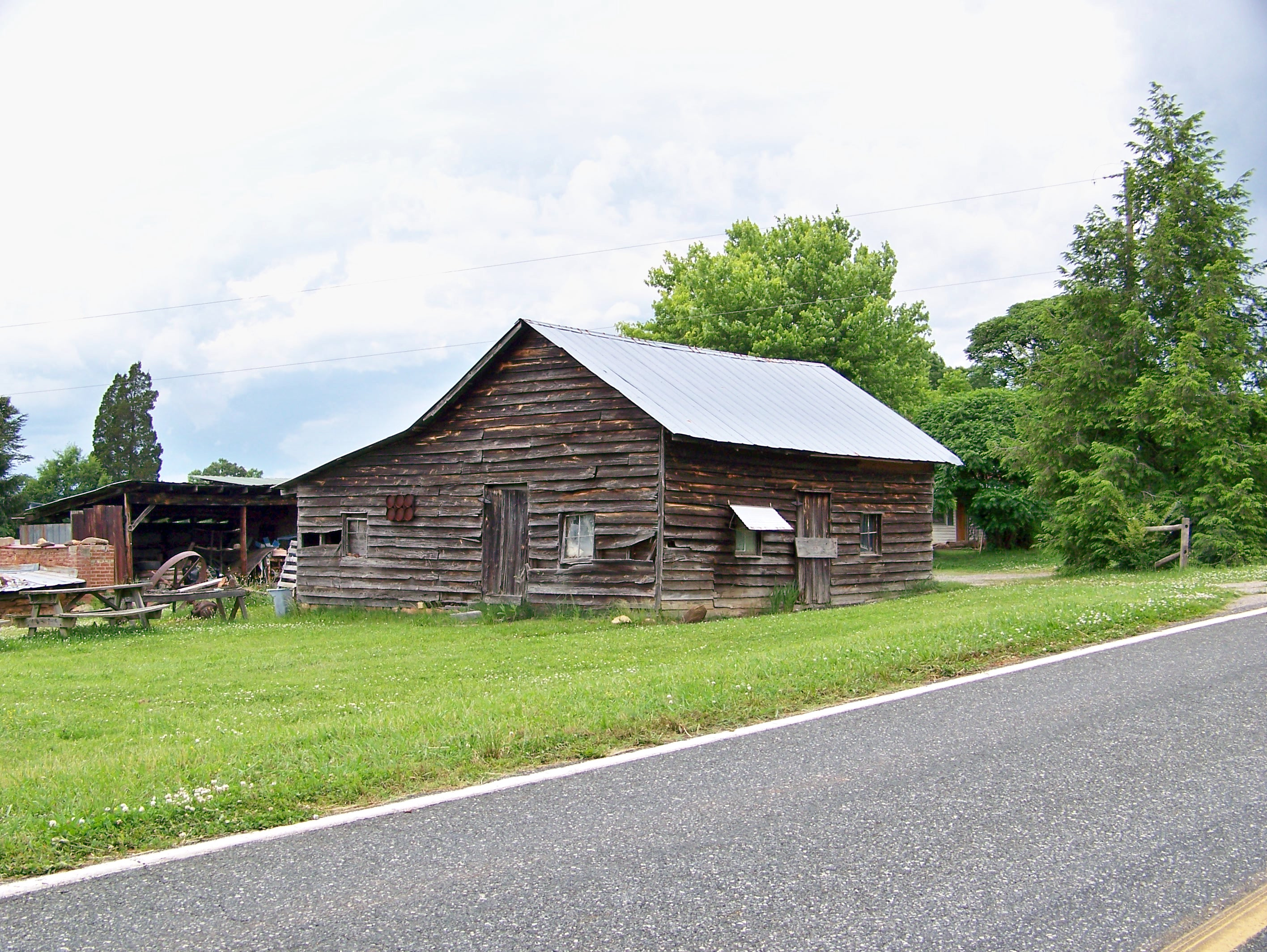

- Location within North Carolina Location within the United States
- Location: 3171 Cat Square Rd., near Vale, North Carolina
- Coordinates: 35°33′47″N 81°25′46″W
- Area: 2.7 acres (1.1 ha)
- Built: 1933
- Built by: Reinhardt, Harvey
- Architectural style: Gable front house
- NRHP reference No.: 07001376
- Added to NRHP: January 9, 2008

Reinhardt-Craig House, Kiln and Pottery Shop is a historic home, kiln, and pottery shop located near Vale, Lincoln County, North Carolina. The house, kiln and pottery shop, were built by Harvey Reinhardt between 1933 and 1936. The house is a one-story, rectangular frame building, two bays wide by three bays deep. It has a front gable roof and a shed-roofed, full-width, front porch. The kiln is a traditional, wood-fired, alkaline glaze groundhog cross-draft kiln that includes a firebox, arch, and chimney, all made of brick. It measures 24 feet, 11 inches long by 11 feet, 6 inches wide. The one-story shop is a frame structure with a side-gabled tin roof and wood clapboard siding. Also on the property is a contributing pugmill built in 1949. The pottery was a producer of traditional Catawba Valley Pottery and associated with Burlon Craig (ca. 1914–2002).

It was listed on the National Register of Historic Places in 2008.
