= Wilford Conrow =

American painter

Wilford Seymour Conrow (1880-1957) was an American artist, most noted for portrait painting. He married Lyra Millette.

== Early life ==
Wildford Conrow was born in South Orange, New Jersey on June 14, 1880. He studied business at the Polytechnic Institute of Brooklyn, graduated with a degree in business from Princeton University in 1901, and, for eight years, worked as secretary and director of a wholesale paper business. Then, from 1911 to 1916, he lived in Paris, studying art at the Académie Julian and exhibiting work in the 1914 Paris Salon. Interrupted by World War I, Conrow left his studies to serve the U.S. camouflage department in Europe, designing concealment for men and machinery. While serving in Paris, he met Lyra Millette, an American Red Cross director, and his future wife.

== Later life and work ==
After the war, Conrow returned to New York City, where he lived with his wife above Carnegie Hall and operated a successful portrait studio. During the summers, he resided in Hendersonville, North Carolina. In 1940, during an art exhibition in Asheville, North Carolina, Conrow met artist Paul Whitener. Conrow had never considered himself a teacher, but when Whitener petitioned the portraitist to instruct him, Conrow accepted the promising young artist as his student. The two worked together each summer for the next fourteen years. During this time, Whitener expressed an interest in establishing an art museum in his hometown of Hickory, North Carolina. As Vice-president of the American Artists Professional League in New York, Conrow was greatly in favor of a museum that would promote American art in the south, and proved to be instrumental in the development of the eventual Hickory Museum of Art. Over the years, he would provide the museum with his knowledge of American art, New York connections, paintings from his private collection, and a large number of his own works. His portraits are characterized by an intimacy achieved through weeks of time spent with each of his subjects. Beyond physical appearance, he strove to portray character, and becoming acquainted with the subject was consistently part of Conrow's painting process. He is also known for his unconventional use of bold color to enhance flesh tones. He is included in the permanent collections of the Brooklyn Museum, the Smithsonian American Art Museum, and the Hickory Museum of Art.
