= Lanier Meaders =

American potter

- Born: Quillan Lanier Meaders; October 4, 1917; Mossy Creek, Georgia, U.S.
- Died: February 5, 1998 (aged 80); Mossy Creek, Georgia, U.S.
- Other names: Q. Lanier Meaders
- Occupation: Potter

Quillan Lanier Meaders (October 4, 1917 – February 5, 1998) was an American potter best known for face jugs, for which he was regarded as a master of the form.

== Early life ==
Face jug, 1979

Meaders' grandfather, John Milton Meaders, started a pottery business in the community of Mossy Creek, Georgia in 1893, employing his five sons. Son Cheever Meaders took over the business in 1920. Grandson Lanier Meaders continued the traditional ceramic craftsmanship of his forefathers by producing alkaline-glazed stoneware, solely working with a foot-powered treadle wheel and a wood-fired kiln. Like his father, he used materials that were indigenous to the region. His ash glaze was made of sifted ashes from his kiln, Albany slip and regular stoneware clay, and powdered calcium carbonate. Meaders typically created pieces in earth-brown, olive-green and rust-gray similar to those while a young apprentice to his father.

== Career ==
Signature on jug

Meaders' contributions to Southern folk art have been recognized by multiple entities including the National Endowment for the Arts, the Smithsonian Institution and the Library of Congress. His work is exhibited in the Smithsonian and various museums across the United States. In 1978 he and his mother, Arie Meaders, were honorees of the Library of Congress with Meaders Pottery Day. He was a recipient of a 1983 National Heritage Fellowship, the United States government's highest honor in the folk and traditional arts, awarded by the National Endowment for the Arts, and was the recipient of the Governor's Award for the Arts in 1987.
