= Kentucky Folk Art Center =

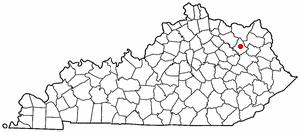
- Established: 1985
- Location: 102 West First St., Morehead, Kentucky 40351
- Coordinates: 38.18167°N 83.43306°W
- Type: Art museum
- Website: www.moreheadstate.edu/kfac/

The Kentucky Folk Art Center is a folk art museum administered by Morehead State University in Morehead, Kentucky, United States. Its focus is not only to preserve and educate the public on visual Appalachian folk art but also to promote traditional Appalachian traditional music, storytelling, literature, dance, and crafts.

== About ==
The Kentucky Folk Art Center was established in 1985 as part of Morehead State University's Folk Art Collection. The collection was housed on two separate buildings on campus until 1997 when the collection was moved to the historic Union Grocery Building in Morehead's First Street Arts District. It holds 1,407 works by Kentucky folk artists.

The main floor of the historic building includes the Lovena and William Richardson Gallery, a rotating installation of 115 objects from KFAC's 1400-piece collection of folk art; the museum store, a retail outlet for folk art and educational materials; and the 50-seat Jimmie Ruth Auditorium for group activities. The second floor houses the Garland and Minnie Adkins Gallery, a showcase for a variety of cultural events; the Edgar Tolson Folk Art Library; a conference room and staff offices; and modern archival and storage space for the permanent collection.

In 2009, the museum was awarded the Kentucky Folk Heritage Award.

In recent years the center has suffered from large budget cuts from both the State and Morehead University.

== Featured artists ==
- Minnie Adkins
- Linvel Barker
- Ronald & Jessie Cooper
- Marvin Finn
- Charley Kinney
- Noah Kinney
- Jo Neace Krause
- Helen LaFrance
- Tim Lewis
- Carl McKenzie
- Robert Morgan
- Mark Anthony Mulligan
- Earnest Patton
- Nan Phelps
- Hugo Sperger
- Donny Tolson
- Edgar Tolson
- LaVon Van Williams
