= Spencer Baird Nichols =

American painter

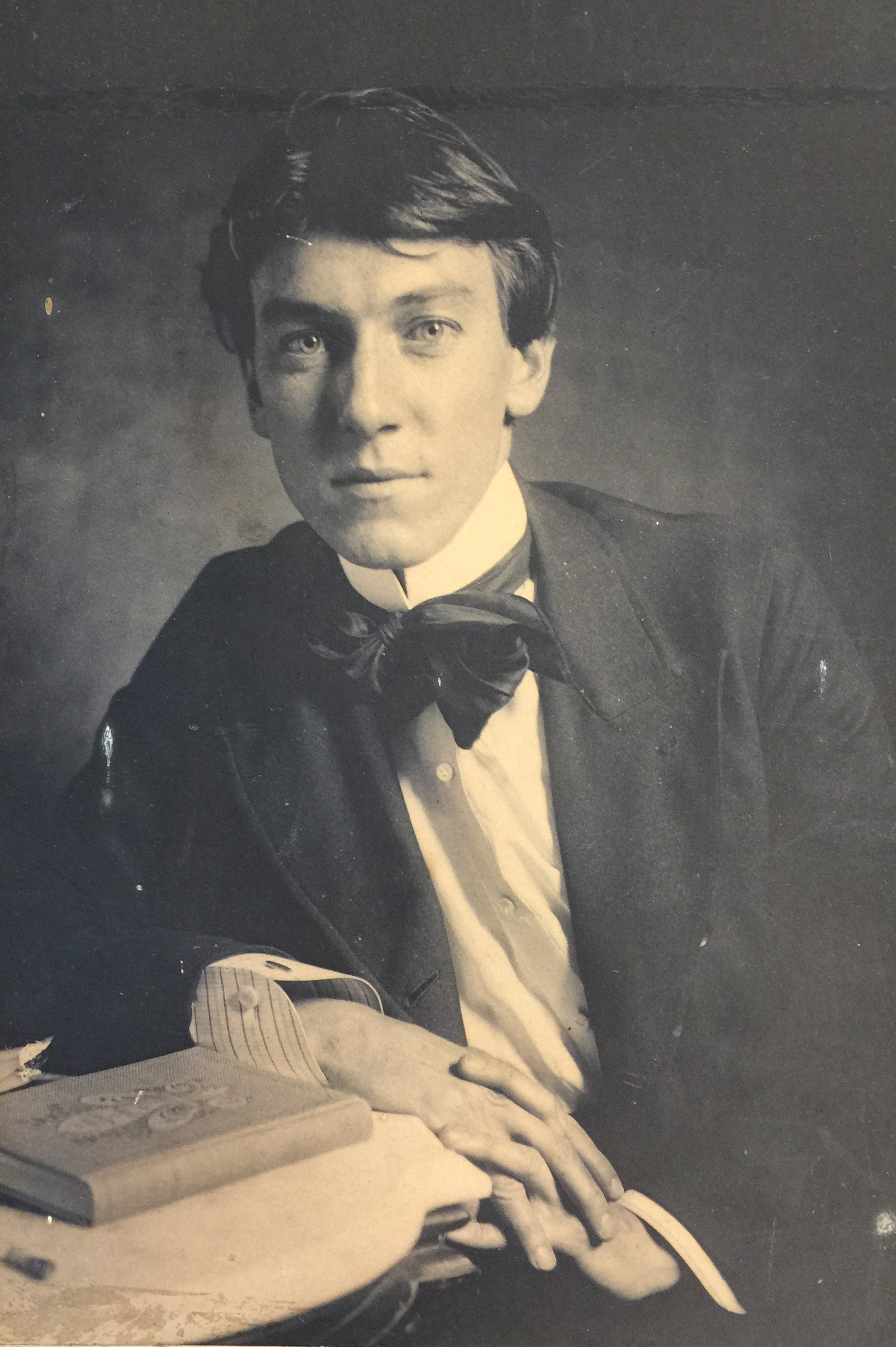
- The painter Spencer Baird Nichols photographed at age 24 by his brother Hobart in 1899.
- Born: February 13, 1875; Washington, DC, US
- Died: August 28, 1950 (aged 75); Kent, Connecticut, US
- Other name: Spencer Nichols
- Education: Corcoran School of Art and Design (1895)
- Occupation: painter
- Known for: portrait paintings, landscapes, illustrations, murals
- Spouse: Helen Agnes Mather

Spencer Baird Nichols (February 13, 1875–August 28, 1950) was an American portrait painter, illustrator and muralist. While he received much recognition and was quite prolific in his time, much of his creative work was ultimately destroyed, lost or unattributed to him. What survives are a handful of easel paintings and some commercial work, particularly book illustrations and murals.

== Early life and education ==
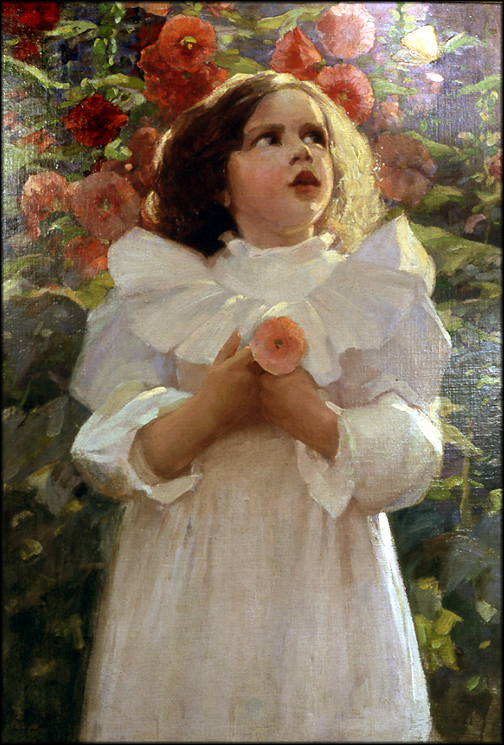
Grandmother's Garden: an early oil on canvas by Spencer Baird Nichols.

Nichols' father, Hobart Nichols, was a noted wood engraver who engraved the sketches in The History of North American Birds by Baird, Brewer and Ridgway. He named his son Spencer Baird Nichols after Spencer Fullerton Baird, a naturalist, prolific writer, and first curator of the National Museum at the Smithsonian. Spencer's brother, Henry Hobart Nichols Jr., was a landscape painter. The brothers were both married artists and their descendants include painters.

Nichols' childhood was spent in Washington, D.C., and although he dropped out of school at age 11 in order to concentrate on his art, he went on to study under Howard Helmick and to attend the Corcoran School of Art and Design. He also took classes at the Art Students' League. He met his wife, Helen Agnes Mather, while serving as an instructor there.

In 1911 Nichols contracted to provide illustrations to the publishing house Frederick A. Stokes & Co. He also took a position designing stained glass windows and murals for Louis Comfort Tiffany Studios. With these steady incomes, he was able to marry Helen that year.

After marriage, Nichols and his wife moved to an artists' colony in Bronxville, New York. They had four children, Spencer Mather born 1912, Hobarth born 1915, Margaret in 1921 and Helen in 1924.

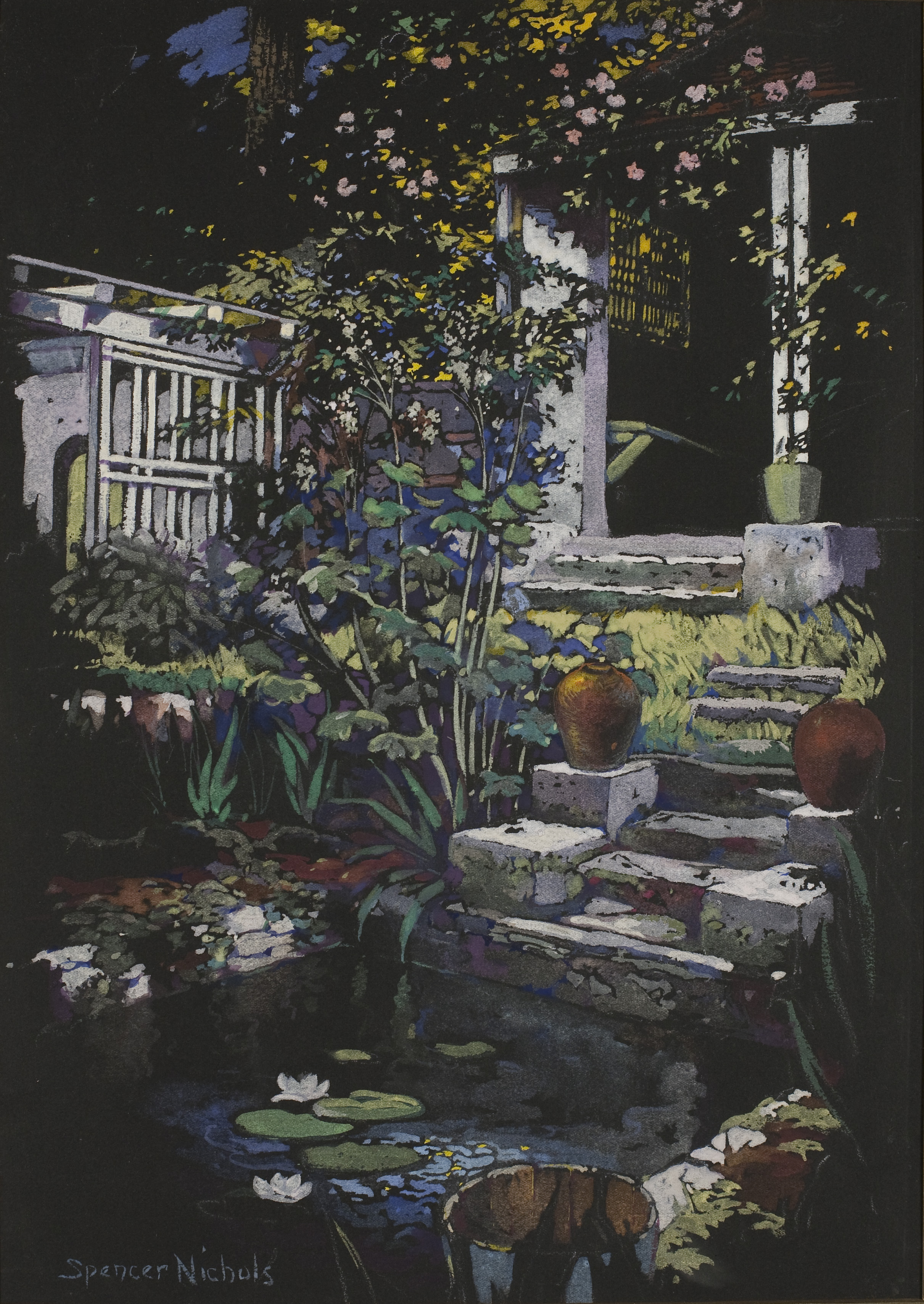
Gouache on black paper painting by Spencer Baird Nichols depicting the water garden in the Bronxville home the family had from 1915 to 1922.

The Nichols' son Mather died in 1922 of typhoid, which led them to move to Kent, Connecticut, where they were among the founding members of another artist colony. According to the Kent Historical Society "The Kent Art Association was founded in 1923 by nine well established artists who knew each other when they lived in New York before moving to Kent: Rex Brasher, Elliot Clark, Floyd Clymer, F. Luis Mora, George Laurence Nelson, Spencer Nichols, Robert Nisbet, Williard Dryden Paddock and Frederick Waugh. Six were National Academicians."

The 1932 fire that destroyed the Nichols' uninsured home and studio in Kent consumed all of Nichols' paintings that were there at the time, which were many due to the Depression. The artist colony rallied to support the Nichols family and a new cottage was constructed for them.

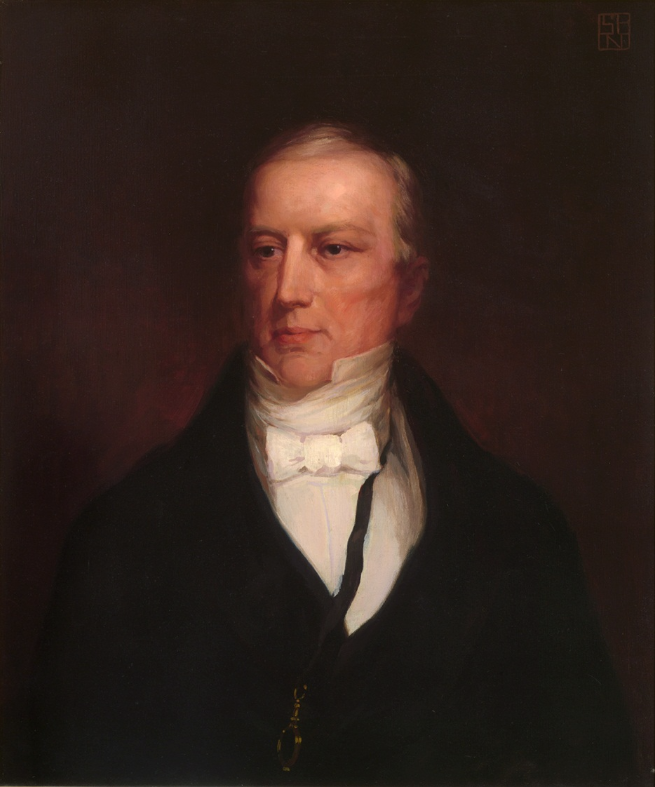
Portrait of Andrew Stevenson by Nichols, c. 1911.

== Career ==
According to Nichols, he was devoted to art from "as far back as I can remember." At the age of 11 he left school to concentrate on painting and portraiture.

Nichols' works include a portrait of Speaker Andrew Stevenson which was completed in 1911 and hangs in the House of Representatives.

Asia held a significant interest to Nichols and he spent several years studying in Japan, China and a bit of Persia prior to a 1920 exhibit in the Madison Gallery. This exhibit has the only mention of a sculpture by Nichols "A carved plaster panel is finely coloured and has much the same decorative quality as his paintings" according to American Art News. That article describes some of the paintings, saying of Nichols "He is especially happy in his rendition of limpid and luminous blues. The Dance, showing two girls in rhythmic motion is Oriental in design, line. and composition, and a rich colorful canvas. The Hall, which portrays a figure of a graceful woman an opalescent night light, is notable for the original motif and personal expression. The Pearl is imaginative, veiled in atmospheric, mysterious charm; The Mystery of India shows knowledge of the subject; Autumn Gold, presents a sweet-f aced girl, surrounded by rich Autumn foliage, a canvas handled with a reserve of color that blends harmoniously with the delicate beauty of the flesh. Throughout all the artist's work there is a decorative tendency…"

In 1923 Nichols was elected as a member of the National Academy of Design in New York and in 1933 Nichols was honored as an academician.

Much of his early work was destroyed in a fire in 1932 which Nichols documented through a painting "Rising Star" depicting himself and his wife amidst the ashes of their home. In addition to the enormous personal and financial loss all of the paintings, artworks and his home and studio in the fire, documentation of his early works and patrons was also lost. Within the "Spencer Baird Nichols and Nichols Family Papers, 1870-1994" records at the Archives of American Art, Smithsonian Institution, there are lists of artworks that went to galleries for exhibit and sale after 1932 but no records of to whom his paintings were sold or gifted.

Out of financial necessity, in 1934, he became Director of Art at Marot Junior College in Thompson, Connecticut, a position he held until the school closed in 1941.

Connecticut Works Progress Administration (WPA) records state that Nichols "began working for the Connecticut WPA in 1936 and completed murals in Kent, Litchfield, and New Milford Schools. For the WPA, he completed 33 works that were allocated to Litchfield High School, Laurel Heights Sanatorium, Hartford Board of Park Commissioners, Long Lane Farm, New Haven Community Center, and the Connecticut State Farm for Women."

According to the New Milford Board of Education, Nichols completed two beautiful murals at the Lillis Administration building on the second and third floors.

== Death ==
Nichols died on August 28, 1950, in Kent, Connecticut, following "a long illness" according to his obituary in The New York Times.

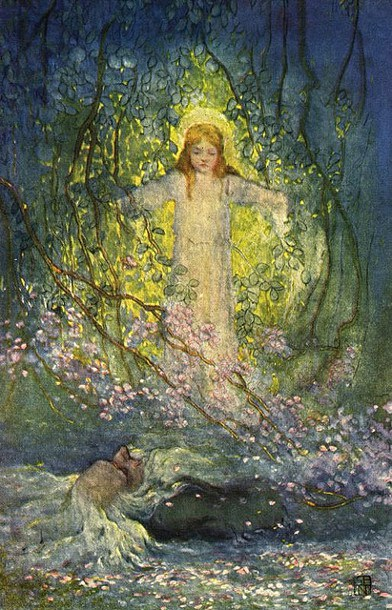
Cover illustration by Spencer Baird Nichols for The Happy Prince by Oscar Wilde 1913.

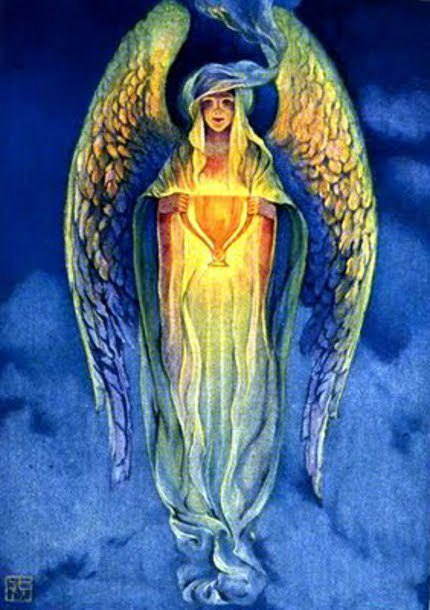
Illustration by Spencer Baird Nichols for The Spirit of Christmas by Arthur Gleason in 1912.

== Illustrations ==
Spencer Baird Nichols illustrated several books published by the Frederick A. Stokes Company:

- Christmas Stories, by Charles Dickens; illustrated by Spencer Baird Nichols, published by Frederick A. Stokes Co., New York [1913] 5 p. l., 3-422 p. col. front., col. plates. 21 cm.
- The Lord of Misrule, and Other Poems With frontispiece in colours by Spencer Baird Nichols, published by Frederick A. Stokes Co., New York [1915] 184 p. col. front. 21 cm.

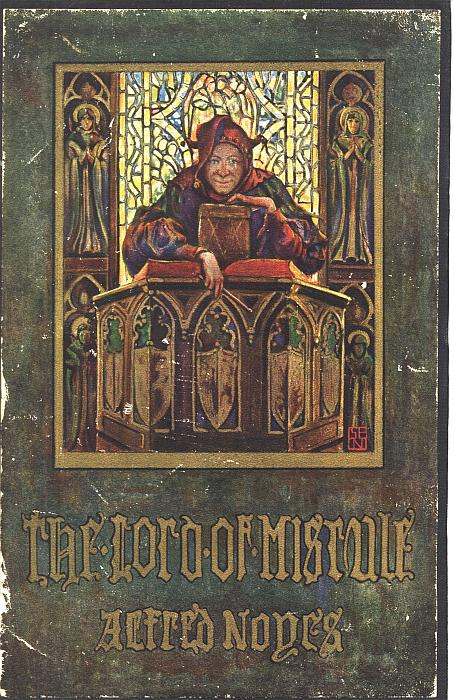
Cover illustration by Spencer Baird Nichols for The Lord of Misrule and Other Poems by Alfred Noyes in 1915

- The Happy Prince, and Other Stories, by Oscar Wilde; illustrated by Spencer Baird Nichols, published by Frederick A. Stokes Co., New York [1913] 204 p. illus. 21 cm.
- At My Window; Hours with my Pigeons, by Ruth A. Johnstone; with frontispiece in colors by Spencer Baird Nichols, published by Frederick A. Stokes Co., New York [1911] xiii, 114 p. col. front. 19 cm.
- Grenstone Poems, a Sequence, by Witter Bynner ... With cover and frontispiece by Spencer Baird Nichols, published by Frederick A. Stokes Co., New York [c1917] xvi p., 307 illus. 21 cm.
- The Spirit of Christmas, by Arthur H. Gleason; illustrated by Spencer Baird Nichols, published by Frederick A. Stokes Co., New York. [c1912] x, 81 p. col. front., illus. 19 cm.
- The Little Hunchback Zia by Frances Hodgson Burnett with illustrations by Spencer Baird Nichols and W.T. Benda. published by Frederick A. Stokes Co., New York [1915].
- Home and the Inner Life by Arthur H. Gleason with illustrations by Spencer Baird Nichols published by Frederick A. Stokes Co., New York [1914].

== Awards ==
- Corcoran Prize, Society of Washington Artists 1901
- Two Ranger Fund Purchase Awards, 1928 and 1932
- Altman Prize at the National Academy of Design 1931
