= Jim McDowell (ceramic artist) =

American ceramic artist

Jim McDowell, born 25 September 1945, is a ceramic artist based in Weaverville, North Carolina, who makes face jugs and utilitarian pottery.

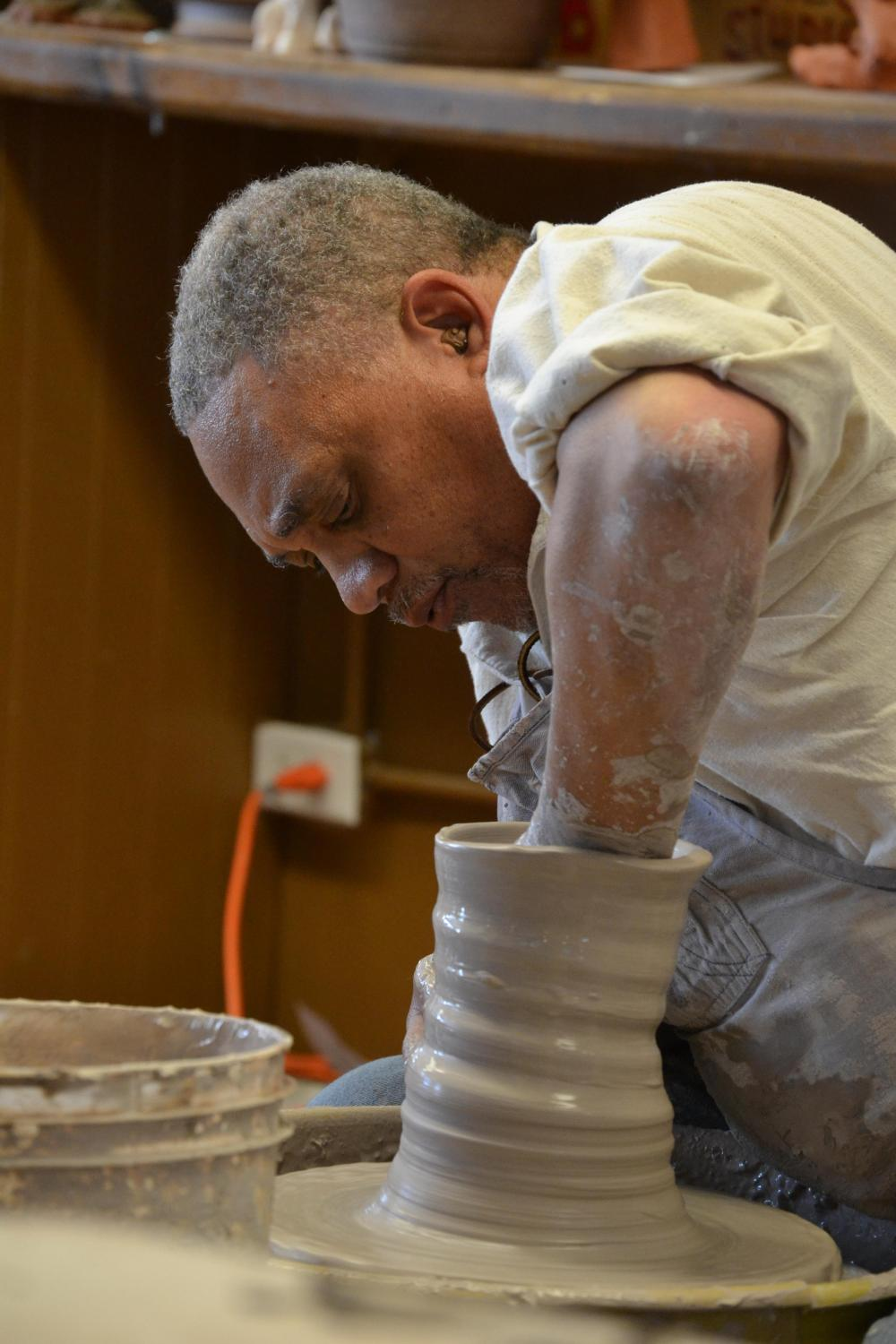
Jim McDowell at the wheel. Photo courtesy of the artist.

== Biography ==
Born in Norfolk, Virginia, McDowell grew up in Washington, DC. His father James T. McDowell, who was called "Ol'Pa" by the family, was in the Navy and was an amateur painter.

McDowell's four-times Great Aunt Evangeline was an enslaved potter in Jamaica who made face jugs. As a young man, Jim McDowell overheard his father and his grandfather, Boyce McDowell, talking about her at a family funeral. They explained that slaves were not given gravestones, so a face jug was sometimes made to serve as a grave marker.

McDowell worked in a coal mine in Pennsylvania before joining the United States Army. Afterwards, he returned to Pennsylvania and resumed work in the mines. Using an entire paycheck, he purchased a pottery wheel and a thousand pounds of clay.

== Education ==
McDowell studied art at Mount Aloysius College and took sculpture classes at Virginia Commonwealth University. As a potter, he is mostly self taught. While he was in the Army stationed at Ansbach, Germany in the 1960s, he had a part time job at the base craft shop that had a kick-wheel pottery wheel. With no one at the base to instruct him, McDowell found a group of German potters in Nuremberg. Although he spoke little German, he explained that he wanted to learn to throw on the wheel. They initially told him no. He persisted and was handed a broom. After sweeping the floor every Saturday for a few weekends, one of the German potters taught him some basic skills on the wheel. He later enrolled in a workshop with potter David Robinson in Weare, New Hampshire. He also studied and worked with ceramicists Jack Troy, Kevin Crowe, David Hovland, David Shaner, and Charles Counts.

== Art ==
"When I first made... [a face jug], I gave it Black features, sometimes exaggerated, thick lips and a broad nose with flaring nostrils. I’ve kept that style. I make teeth out of broken china to give them a scary or fierce look. I sometimes put stained glass on the face so when it's fired the glass runs down like tears."

McDowell's face jugs pay homage to David Drake, an enslaved potter that lived in Edgefield, South Carolina. One of the ways he honors the legacy of Drake is to write on his vessels. He sometimes calls himself "the Black potter." McDowell describes his work as a way to recuperate the labor and efforts of African people and Black Americans.

"I make my face jugs to honor my people who came to this country in bondage through the Middle Passage and not only survived but thrived. I sometimes make a jug to honor a person of color who has achieved greatness or endured tremendous discrimination, or worse. I pay homage to Civil Rights activists and Freedom Fighters whose job, it seems, will never be over. I pay homage to those of my race who taught and wrote and built and preached and orated and invented and created."
