= Jerry Dolyn Brown =

American potter and folk artist (1942–2016)

- Brown and his face jugs in 2009
- Born: November 9, 1942; Pine Springs, Lamar County, Alabama, U.S.
- Died: March 4, 2016 (aged 73); Tupelo, Mississippi, U.S.
- Education: Ninth generation Traditional artist
- Known for: Stoneware pottery
- Movement: Southern Traditional
- Awards: National Heritage Fellowship, Alabama Folk Heritage Award

Jerry Dolyn Brown (November 9, 1942 – March 4, 2016) was an American folk artist and traditional stoneware pottery maker who lived and worked in Hamilton, Alabama. He was a 1992 recipient of a National Heritage Fellowship from the National Endowment for the Arts and a 2003 recipient of the Alabama Folk Heritage Award. His numerous showings included the 1984 Smithsonian Festival of American Folklife with his uncle, potter Gerald Stewart.

== Biography ==
Brown is a ninth generation traditional potter, the son of Horace Vincent "Jug" Brown and Hattie Mae Stewart Brown. He learned his art in childhood but had to give it up following the deaths of his elder brother Jack and his father in 1964 and 1965. He worked in logging for nearly twenty years but then aided by his wife Sandra, his uncle Gerald Stewart and other family members was able to return to art in the early 1980s, building his studio from an old barn. Gerald in particular helped him re-learn techniques he had forgotten during the years in logging and it was Gerald who went with him to the Smithsonian Festival of American Folklife. Sandra and Jerry continued to work together throughout his life. Jeff Wilburn, his stepson, worked with them and was trained as a full-time potter. Sandra is responsible for much of the glazing, finishing and marketing, as well as much of the sculpture of the faces on the face jugs. She has the reputation of being "the most active female folk potter in Alabama". He died on March 4, 2016, in Tupelo, Mississippi, after a brief illness.

== Studio ==
As inheritor of both Brown and Stewart pottery traditions Brown produced utilitarian stoneware in the nineteenth and early twentieth century styles as well as to create innovations for more modern usages, such as his apple baking dishes, chicken cookers and microwave bacon cookers. However much of his critical acclaim centered on recognition of his unique style of whimsical art, especially face jugs. (According to his mother he had learned the basics of whimsical pottery making from his father, as the Stewarts did not have a face jug tradition.)

Despite use of some modern equipment such as an electric kiln for firing some types of glazes and use of powered throwing wheels, he continued to use traditional methods such as digging his own clay, maintaining a mule to power his pug mill and firing most of his work in a brick kiln. Other Brown family traditions include the use of a chicken feather to apply some of the glazing patterns, the use of broken pots for teeth in the face jugs, the practice of a two-piece method for large vessels and the use of wheel and handshaping techniques for complex pieces instead of slip casting.

== See also ==
Stoneware tea pot created Brown in June, 2009.

- Ash glaze
- Catawba Valley Pottery (another Southern Traditional style of pottery)
- List of American artists 1900 and after
- National Council for the Traditional Arts
