= Bartmann jug =

16th-17th century German pottery

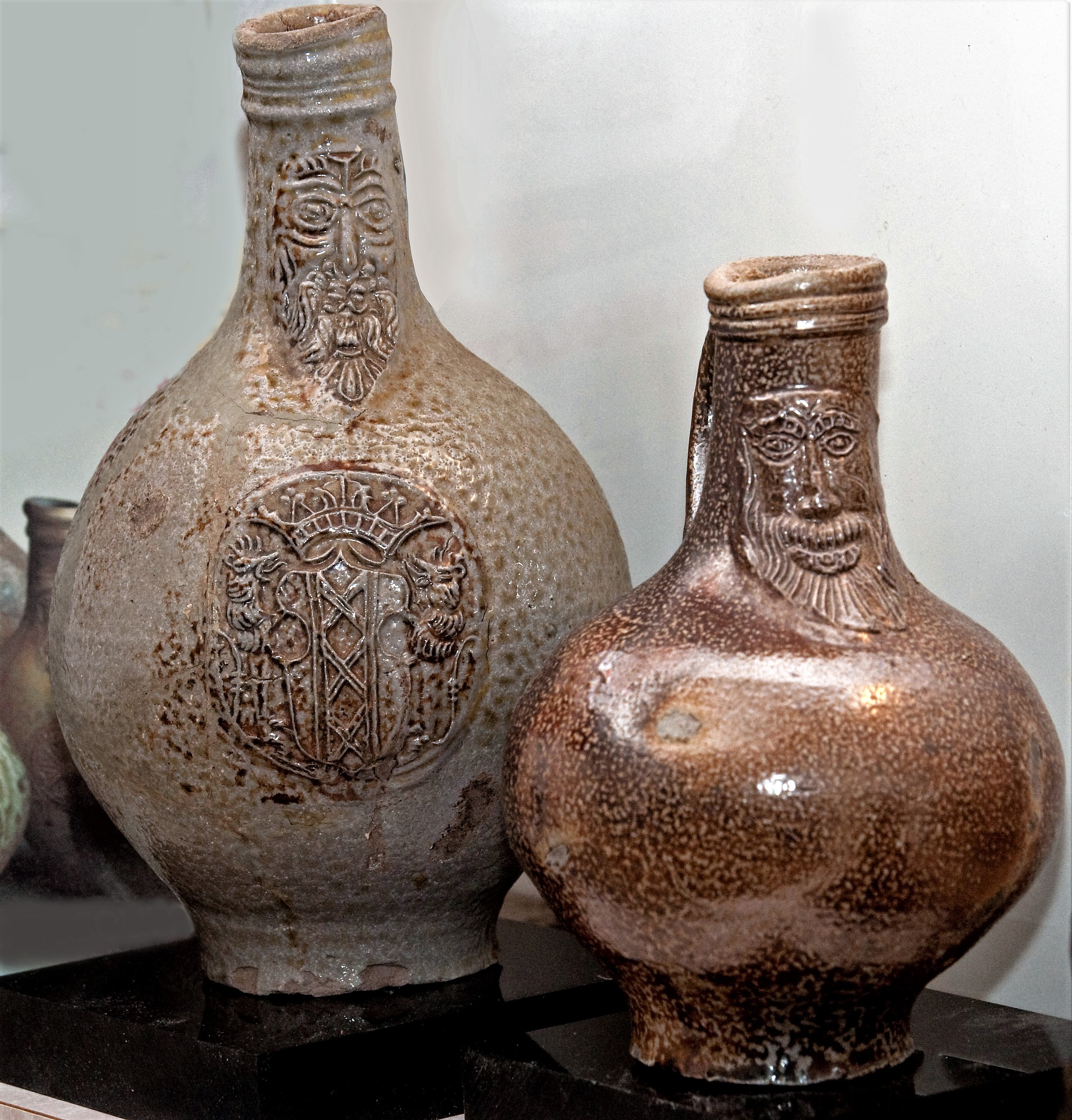
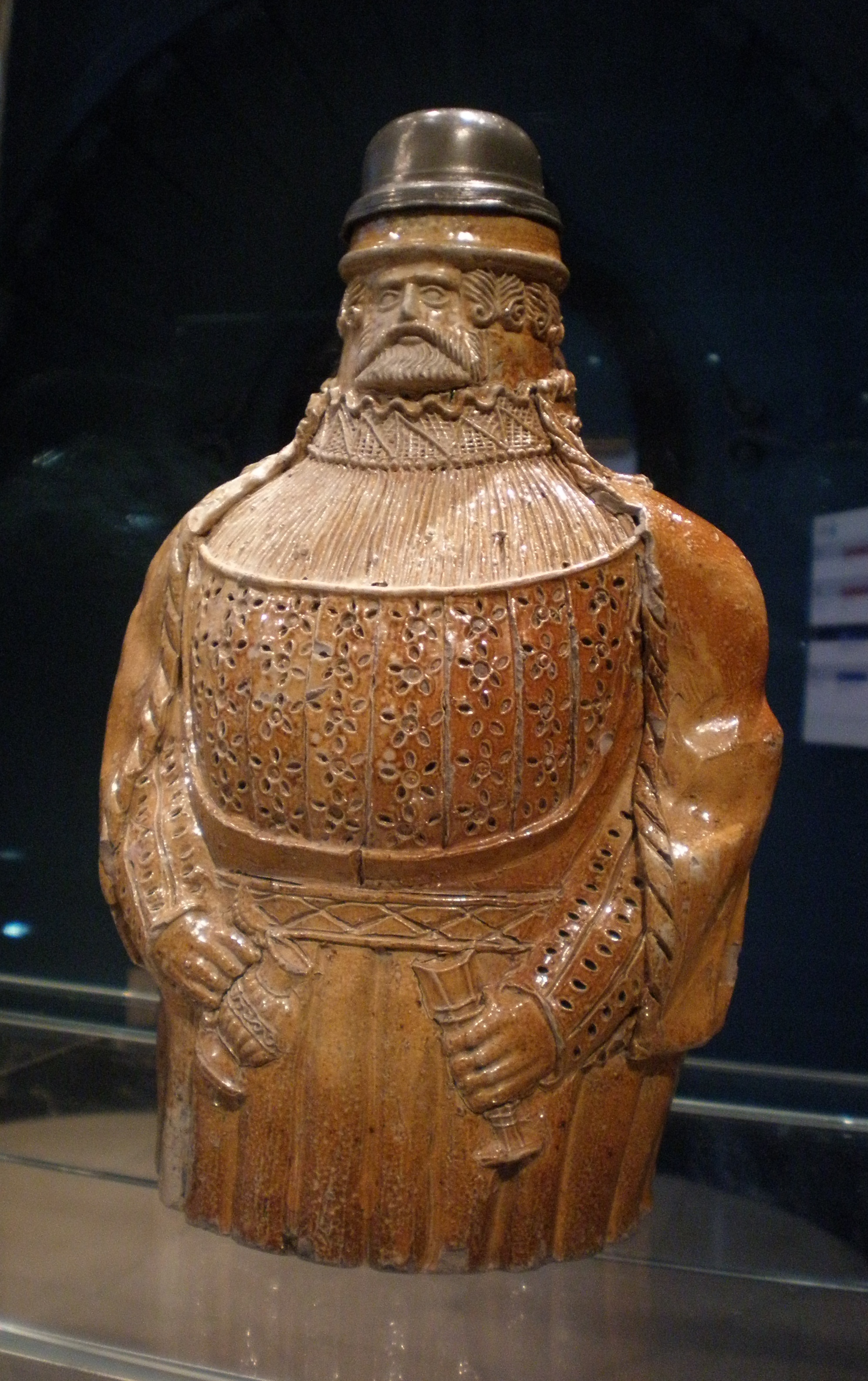
(left) 17th-century German jugs, with one displaying the coat of arms of Amsterdam; (right) An unusually elaborate Bartmann jug, 1525–1550, Cologne, Germany (Victoria and Albert Museum)

A Bartmann pitcher (BE) or Bartmann jug (AE) (from German Bartmann, 'bearded man'), also called a Bellarmine jug, is a type of decorated salt-glazed stoneware that was manufactured in Europe throughout the 16th and 17th centuries, especially in the Cologne region, in what is today western Germany. The characteristic decorative detail is a bearded face mask appearing on the lower neck of the vessel. They were made as jugs, bottles, and pitchers in various sizes and for a multitude of uses, including storage of food or drink, decanting wine and transporting goods.

== Origins ==
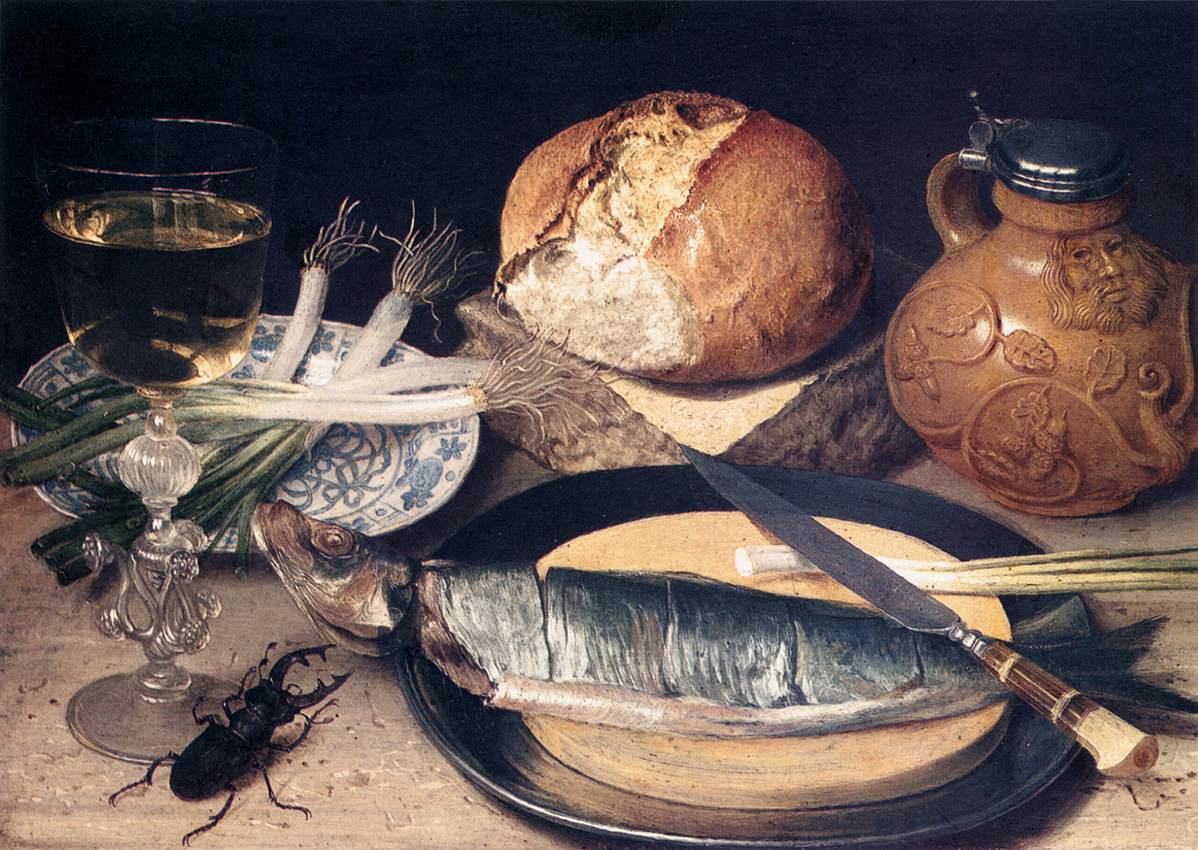
Georg Flegel (1635) Still Life with Stag Beetle, Wallraf–Richartz Museum. The jug has been dated to c. 1525, making it an example of how long they have been used in households.

Stoneware was a key export product of Germany in the late Middle Ages and the early modern period and was shipped to markets in Northern and Eastern Europe, the British Isles and later to colonies in North America and Asia. One of the largest centers of stoneware production was located in the Rhineland around the city of Cologne and the nearby towns and villages of Siegburg, Troisdorf-Altenrath, and Frechen. Like other German stoneware of the period, it was characterized by relief decoration through the use of mould techniques. Various patterns and motifs were used throughout different periods and regions, and one of the most distinct and well-known was the bearded face-mask (German: Bartmaske) used most frequently by Cologne and especially Frechen potters in the 16th and 17th centuries to decorate the necks of stoneware bottles, jugs and pitchers. The image of the bearded face is believed to have originated in the mythical wild man creature, popular in northern European folklore from the 14th century, and later appearing as an illustration on everything from manuscript illuminations to metalworkings.

The popular alternative name Bellarmine is recorded earliest in 1634, and is in popular tradition associated with the cardinal Robert Bellarmine (1542–1621), a fierce opponent of Protestantism in the Low Countries and northern Germany. The reason for the association with Bellarmine is not entirely clear but was possibly conceived by Dutch and English Protestants to ridicule the cardinal. Another possibility is his anti-alcohol stance.

== Iconography ==
The defining feature of Bartmann jugs, the bearded face mask, is the only constant motif throughout their production. In the 16th century they could be adorned with popular floral or oakleaf-and-acorn decoration on the body of the vessel. Later, especially in the 17th century, they would frequently be decorated with a medallion in the middle of the body, usually in the form of the arms of royalty, noble families or towns. Many other types of ornamental patterns were used including sobering religious maxims such as Drinck vnd Ezt Godez nit Vergezt, transl. Drink and eat, forget not God. The design of the face masks, or Bartmänner, 'bearded men', went through a design change during the 17th century as they "became progressively debased and notably grotesque".

== Distribution and use ==
The coat of arms of Frechen includes a Bartmann jug, pointing to the importance to the city of stoneware in general, and Bartmann jugs in particular.

Early modern stoneware from Germany, particularly the Rhineland, "enjoys the greatest archaeological distribution around the globe", and this includes the Bartmann jugs. They have been located in archeological sites all over the world, as a sign of European colonization, emigration and trade. A pair of Bartmann jugs have been documented at the site of the wreck of the English ship Sea Venture, lost in 1609 off Bermuda. The jugs have been dated to around 1580–1590, meaning that they had survived for about two decades, including ship transport, which indicates the extent of longevity that Rhenish stoneware could have. The Dutch East India Company routinely used Bartmann jugs to transport mercury, evidence of which has been found at shipwreck sites in the North Sea and as far away as Western Australia. Frechen Bartmann bottles dating from the mid 17th century have been found in graves of native inhabitants in colonial North America, near the Warren River in Rhode Island and in Camden, Virginia. Among the finds of period shipwrecks, Bartmann jugs frequently appear among the finds. A Bartmann bottle donated to the Victoria and Albert Museum in London was most likely a bottle salvaged from the wreck of the mid-16th century warship Mary Rose in 1840.

In the 17th century Bartmann jugs were employed as witch bottles, a popular type of magic item which was filled with various objects such as human urine, hair and magical charms, which were supposed to benefit their owners or harm their enemies. Bottles with malevolent-looking face masks, typical of the period, were routinely chosen for this very purpose.

Bartmann jugs were a signature product of Frechen, but their popularity resulted in imitations made in Raeren (Belgium) and Siegburg. They were manufactured in several locations in England, either by English potters copying German patterns or by immigrant Germans. In the late 19th century, during a revival of German stoneware-making, Bartmann jugs were reproduced based on illustrations of museum collections. Attempted forgeries were discovered in England in the 1990s.

== See also ==
- Catawba Valley Pottery
- Jerry Dolyn Brown

== Sources ==
- "Collectors: Show and Tell – Bellarmine Jar". Australian Broadcasting Corporation. 24 July 2006. Archived from the original on 12 November 2012.
- Gaimster, David (1997). German Stoneware 1200–1900: Archaeological and Cultural History, Containing a guide to the collection of the British Museum, Victoria & Albert Museum and Museum of London. London: British Museum Press. ISBN 0-7141-0571-6.
- Gardiner, Julie, ed. (2013). Before the Mast: Life and Death Aboard the Mary Rose. Vol. 4. Portsmouth, UK: Oxbow Books. ISBN 978-09544-0-294-5.
- "Trashopolis | London". Trashopolis. History Television. 20 November 2010. Archived from the original on 21 November 2010.
