= Helen LaFrance =

African American artist

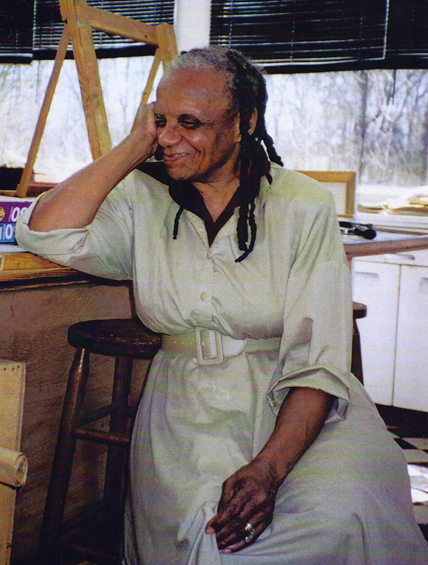
- Born: November 2, 1919; Graves County, Kentucky
- Died: November 20, 2020 (aged 101); Mayfield, Graves County, Kentucky
- Movement: outsider art, memory painting Black art women artists

Helen LaFrance (November 2, 1919 – November 20, 2020) was a self-taught Black American artist born in Graves County, Kentucky, the second of four daughters to James Franklin Orr and Lillie May Ligon Orr. Helen has often been described as both an outsider artist due to her lack of formal training and existence outside the cultural mainstream and as a memory painter, best known for her captures of the disappearing lifestyle of the rural South. Sharing traits in common with memory painters Horace Pippin (1888–1946) and Grandma Moses (1860–1961), LaFrance has been referred to as "the Black Grandma Moses." She also painted powerful and intensely spiritual visionary interpretations of the Bible, in a style that differed radically from her memory paintings.

== Biography ==
LaFrance grew up in a nurturing household under Jim Crow laws, which between 1876 and 1965 prescribed segregation and disadvantaged social, economic and educational conditions for African Americans in the United States. Her father owned and farmed his land, growing tobacco, corn, black-eyed peas, beans, peanuts and sorghum, in a time when sharecropping was customary. She only attended formal school for about three years, but later left to work on the farm. Instead, her parents bought school books to teach her at home and, after her chores were completed, she drew and carved in her spare time. Her first painting depicting a large gray rabbit was created on the back of a leftover piece of wallpaper using watercolors given to her by her aunt. Her artistic bent was encouraged from childhood, and she was encouraged to paint what she saw. When her mother died, she left home to take various jobs in a hospital, caring for children, cooking, working in the tobacco barns and a ceramic factory where she decorated brand-name whiskey bottles. In her 40s, she made enough money to buy art supplies at the grocery store and in 1986 she began painting full-time.

=== Media ===
Not limited to two-dimensional media, LaFrance was an exceptional quilt maker and wood carver of animal sculptures and articulated dolls with handmade textile clothing. But it is her memory paintings that most strongly suggest a common experience. "Simply described, memory painting is a visual history of reminiscences coming from a particular frame of reference." Her sense of time and place resonate with the emotions and memories of the viewer, pulling them in. With oil on canvas, LaFrance shared the traditions of family and church and the values she grew up with, and recollections of coon hunts, fishing, planting and picking cotton and tobacco, growing flowers and using their petals for paint, the general merchandise store, barn dances, the circus, fish fries, family reunions, and church picnics where the community gathered together. She witnessed the Depression, the 1929 stock market crash, the war in Vietnam, and the passing of the Civil Rights Act of 1964 and the Voting Rights Act of 1965. LaFrance's blend of personal experiences and expressive artistry in her paintings have left an emotional impact on viewers.

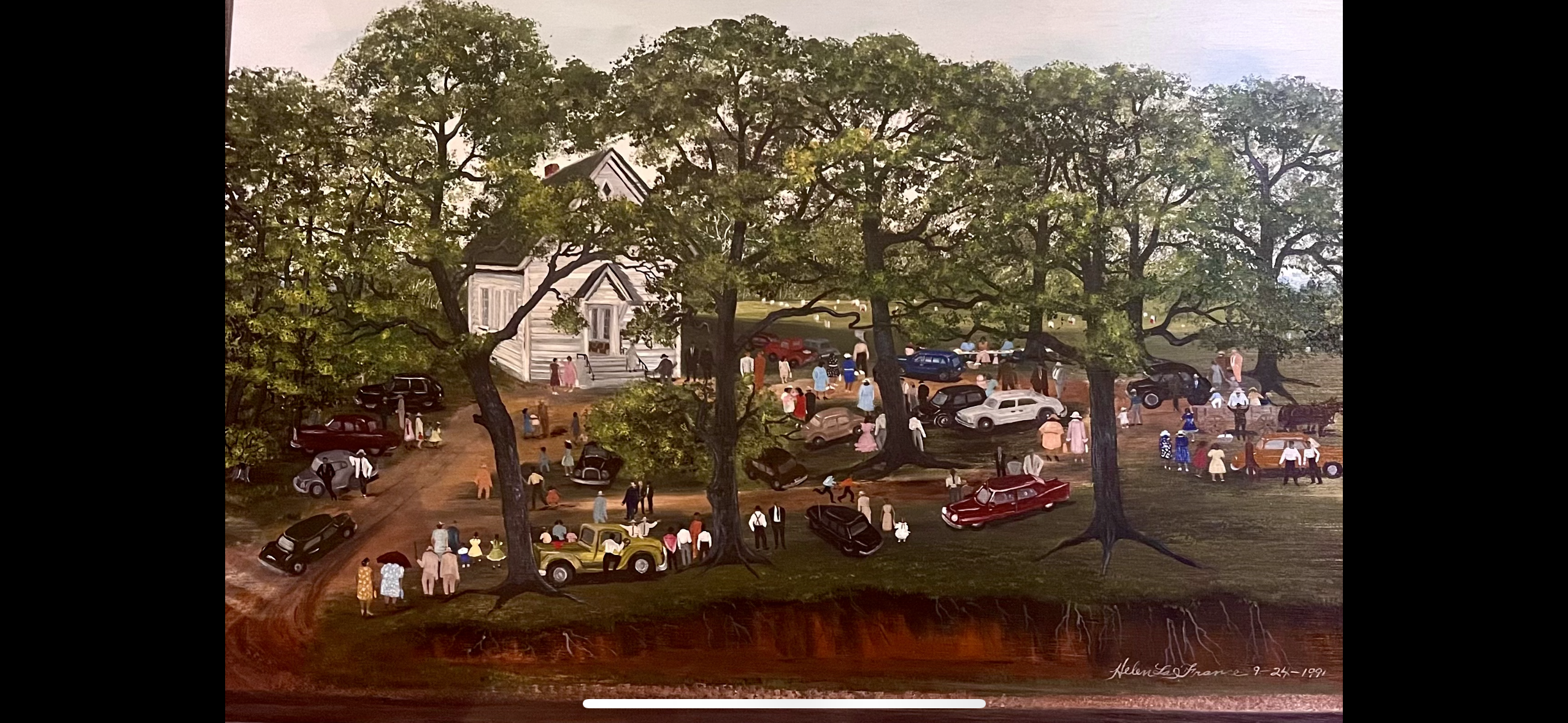
LaFrance, Helen "Church Picnic"

LaFrance also created 28 religious paintings, inspired by the verses she read in a dramatic visionary style and divergent from her better known works due to their explosive colors, themes and size. A selection of these paintings were included in "Helen LaFrance: Kentucky Woman", an exhibition that ran from August 26, 2022, through April 30, 2023 at the prestigious Speed Art Museum. However, the inaugural exhibit of these allegorical paintings ("Helen LaFrance: Biblical Visions") took place at Vanderbilt University in the fall of 2012. Sponsored by the Divinity School's Religion in the Arts & Contemporary Culture program, these images had never been displayed to the public.

In the exhibition catalogue, associate program director Dave Perkins wrote, "These works have a life force, the effect of which is that they are not mere renderings of Biblical events or memories or personal visions or revelations, but something alive. The works are the visions. They are Biblical hermeneutics visualized. They show the artist working creatively with text and concept. Her freedom of imagination in visualizing the sacred text is a quality that enriches contemporary religious thought, practice and education". One of LaFrance's earliest public works is a 1940s mural depicting Jesus praying in the garden of Gethsemane, painted on the entire concrete wall of the choir loft of St. James AME Church in Mayfield, Kentucky. It was one of the churches she attended. Founded by freed slaves in 1868, it is one of the oldest Black congregations in Mayfield and surrounding Graves County. The mural miraculously survived the collapse of the church's roof in the December 10, 2021 tornado that leveled much of the 1923 building and most of Mayfield.

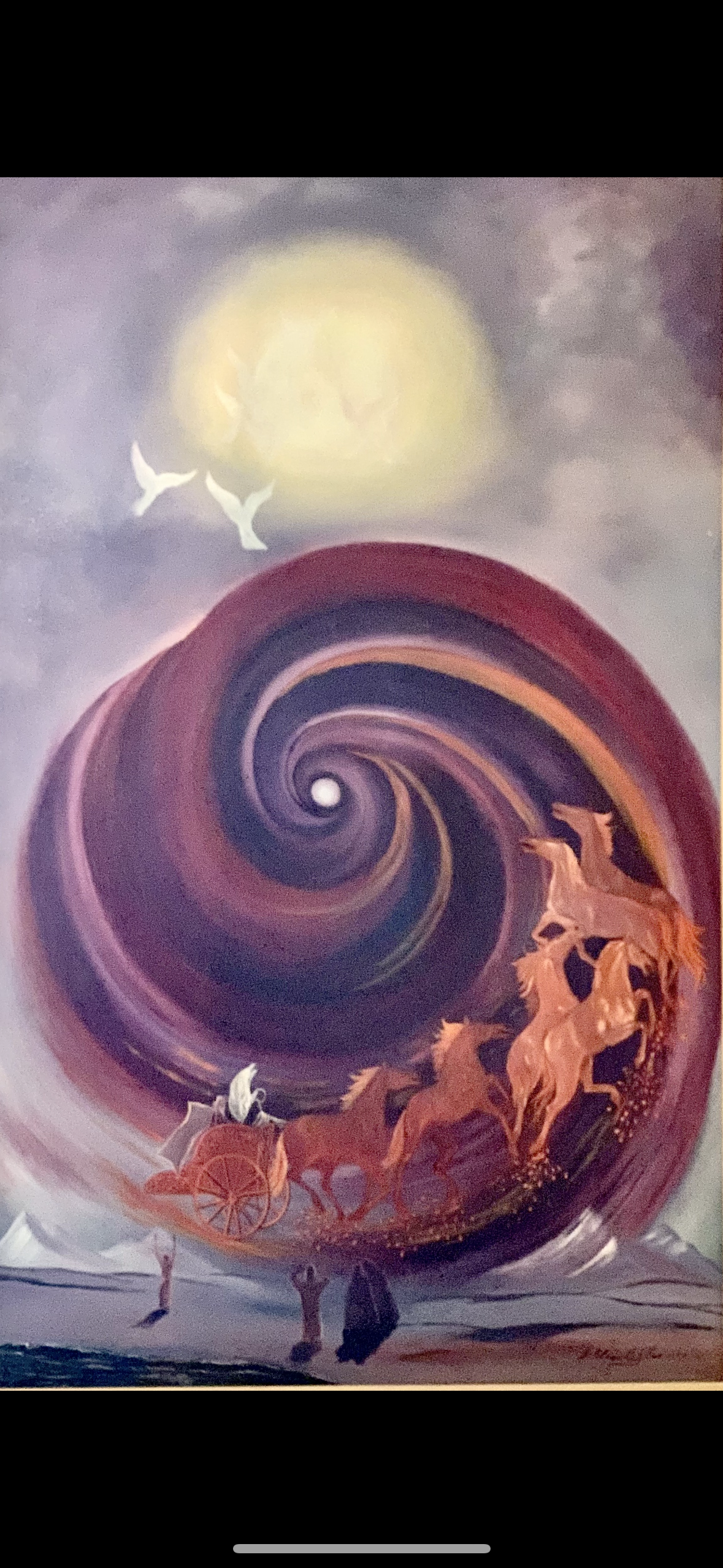
LaFrance, Helen "Chariot of Fire"

In January 2023, The National Trust For Historic Preservation granted the historic church $100,000 to rebuild and expand and to preserve the mural. These paintings mostly reside in a private collection.

== Notable features ==
LaFrance's work is represented in many notable public and private collections in this country and in Europe, including Oprah Winfrey, Gayle King, Bryant Gumbel, Beth Rudin DeWoody, and contemporary artist Red Grooms. Her work has been shown at county fairs, at the Mayfield, Kentucky bank and public library, Murray State University, the Kentucky Museum (Bowling Green), the National Black Fine Arts Show (New York City), and Color, an art show sponsored by Oprah Winfrey in Chicago. Her depiction of workers rolling cut tobacco is included in the Van Nelle collection of tobacco art in Amsterdam, the Netherlands, purchased on a visit to the Kentucky tobacco barn where she worked. The Owensboro Museum of Fine Art holds examples of her work in its collection and featured her in a cataloged show in 1991 called "Kentucky Spirit, the Naive Tradition." The Saint Louis Art Museum and The Speed Art Museum include her work in their permanent collections. The Kentucky Folk Art Center in Morehead also owns her work and has included her in its exhibitions. The subject of a Kentucky Educational Television (KET) program and other documentaries, she received the prestigious Folk Heritage Award for 2011, one of the Governor's Awards in the Arts presented by the Kentucky Arts Council. She is featured in two books by Kathy Moses: Helen LaFrance: Folk Art Memories and the reference book Outsider Art of the South. Her life and her work were documented in the award-winning screenplay by Marilyn Jaye Lewis, Tell My Bones: The Helen LaFrance Story and in the 2019 award-winning documentary "Helen LaFrance: Memories."

In later years, LaFrance resided in a Kentucky nursing home and said of her days, "When I'm not eating or sleeping, I'm painting." She celebrated her 100th birthday in 2019 among family and friends, many who traveled from as far as Memphis and Nashville, Tennessee to attend church, watch a 2019 award-winning documentary on her life and her art, and visit with her. LaFrance died in her sleep at the age of 101 in November 2020 in Mayfield, Kentucky.
