= Minnie Reinhardt =

American painter (1898–1986)

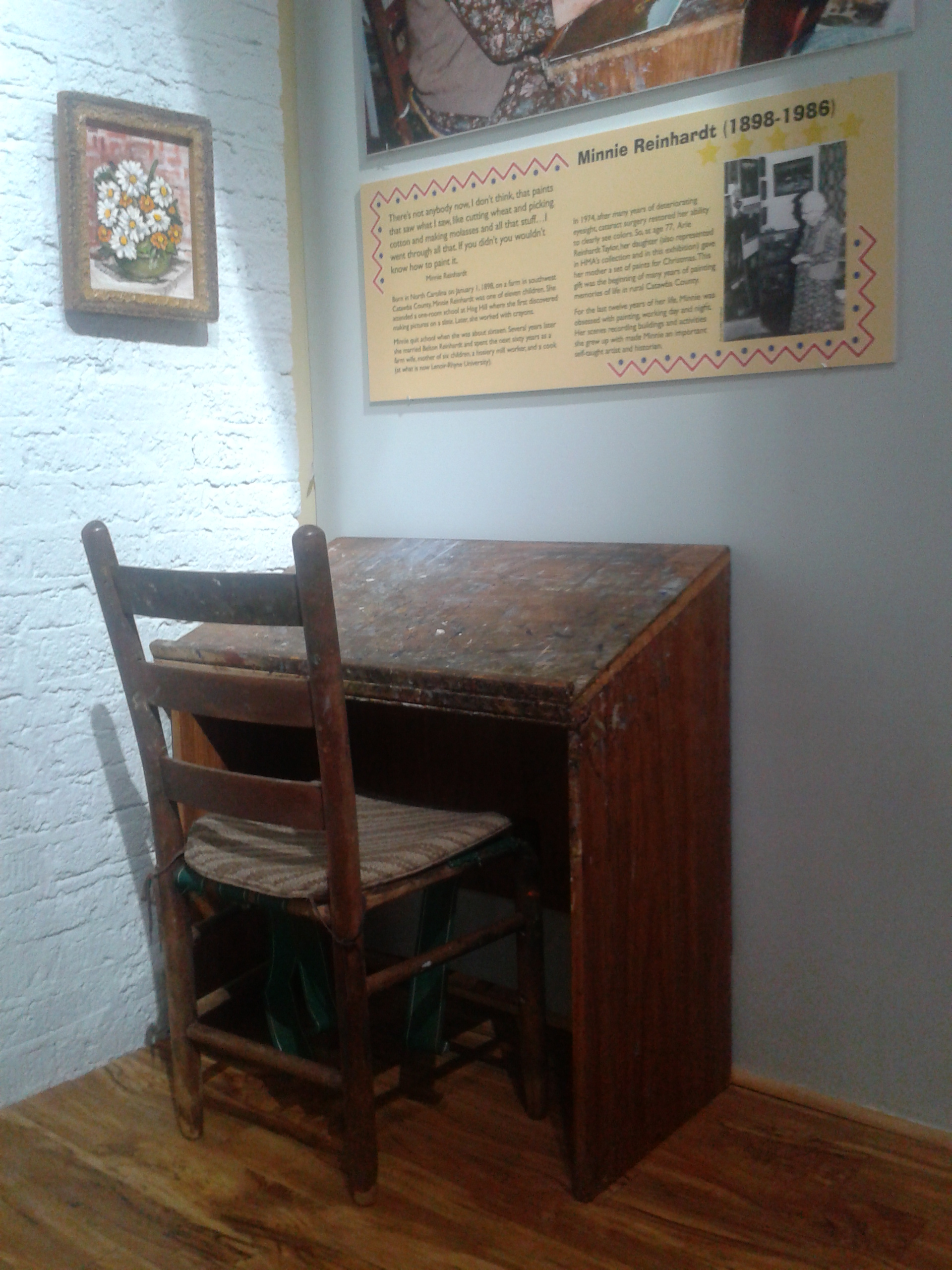
The desk at which Reinhardt did her painting, currently on display at the Hickory Museum of Art.

Minnie Smith Reinhardt (1898–1986) was an American naïve painter, known for her memory paintings.

Sometimes called the "Grandma Moses of Catawba County", Reinhardt grew up in the community of Jugtown, North Carolina, today called Vale. One of eleven children, she helped out on the family farm from an early age. She also attended school, where she was able to draw. Aged about eighteen, she took a position as a cook at Lenoir-Rhyne College in Hickory. There she performed numerous housekeeping duties; she also learned to sew, which she would do for people around the county. She also helped out in the fields, and raised the six children she had with Belton Reinhardt. The family home burned to the ground in 1932, and the family lived in the granary until a new home could be constructed.

By 1974 Reinhardt's vision had become so reduced by cataracts that she was unable to distinguish shapes and colors. Surgery restored her sight, and the experience pushed her to begin painting once more, using oil paints given to her by her daughter Arie Taylor. As a painter she was entirely self-taught. Her works depict a variety of daily activities remembered from her youth. She painted daily at a small desk in front of a window in her home, and was extremely prolific before her death. Her husband made frames for many of her finished paintings. Reinhardt and her husband are buried in the cemetery of Corinth Baptist Church in Vale.

Reinhardt was the subject of an exhibit at the Hickory Museum of Art in 1996. Today that museum owns numerous examples of her work, as well as the desk at which she painted. She is the subject of a catalog, Mine's My Style: The Paintings of Minnie Reinhardt, published in conjunction with the museum exhibition of her work.
