= Minnie Adkins =

American folk artist (born 1934)

- Born: March 13, 1934 (age 92); Isonville, Kentucky, U.S.
- Known for: Wood Carving
- Movement: Folk Art
- Spouse: Garland Adkins
- Awards: Jane Morton Norton Award (1992); Award of Distinction from the Folk Art Society of America (1993); Appalachian Treasure Award (1994)

Minnie Adkins (born March 13, 1934) is an American folk artist.

== Life and work ==
Minnie Adkins is a Kentucky folk artist known for her painted wood carvings of animals – roosters, red foxes, bears, possums, and horses. She was born, 1934, in Isonville, a small town in rural Eastern Kentucky. While a young child, she was attracted to whittling wooden sticks. Her father gave her a pocketknife and she soon took up a hobby practiced mostly by boys and men. In 1968, Adkins, her husband Garland, and their son moved, like many families in Appalachia, to Ohio in search of jobs. Homesick, she continued to carve animals and sold her work at local outdoor markets. Returning to Kentucky in 1983, she began selling her carvings at a craft gallery in Morehead, Kentucky where it was noticed by folk art dealer Larry Hackley who introduced the art work to collectors and galleries outside Kentucky. In 1985, several of her works were included in the collection of the Kentucky Folk Art Center, and is now in many permanent private and public collections. Atkins is featured in a short documentary film and many publications . In the late 1980s, Minnie and Garland founded A Day in the Country, a folk art fair that today features works by over 50 folk artists from Kentucky and nine other states. She continues to carve her iconic figures and collaborate on children's books with Kentucky musician and author Mike Norris.

== Books ==
- Lampell, Ramona and Lampell, Millard. O, Appalachia: Artists of the Southern Mountains Morley, New York : Stewart, Tabori & Chang, 1989. ISBN 1556700989.
- Ludwig, Kelly. Detour Art: Outsider, Folk Art and Visionary Environments Coast to Coast Kansas City, Missouri: Kansas City Star Books, 2007. ISBN 978-1-933466-42-2.

== Permanent collections ==
- American Folk Art Museum, New York City
- Smithsonian Institution, Washington, D.C.
- National Gallery of Art, Washington, D.C.
- High Museum of Art, Atlanta, Georgia
- KMAC Museum, Louisville, Kentucky
- Huntington Museum of Art, Huntington, West Virginia
- Kentucky Folk Art Center, Morehead State University, Morehead, Kentucky
- Hickory Museum of Art, Hickory, North Carolina
- Oprah Winfrey, Private collection
- Barbra Streisand, Private collection
- Bill Cosby, Private collection
- Craft and Folk Art Center, Morehead State University, Morehead, Kentucky
- Owensboro Museum of Fine Art, Owensboro, Kentucky
- Art Museum of West Virginia University, Morgantown, West Virginia
