= Catawba Valley Pottery =

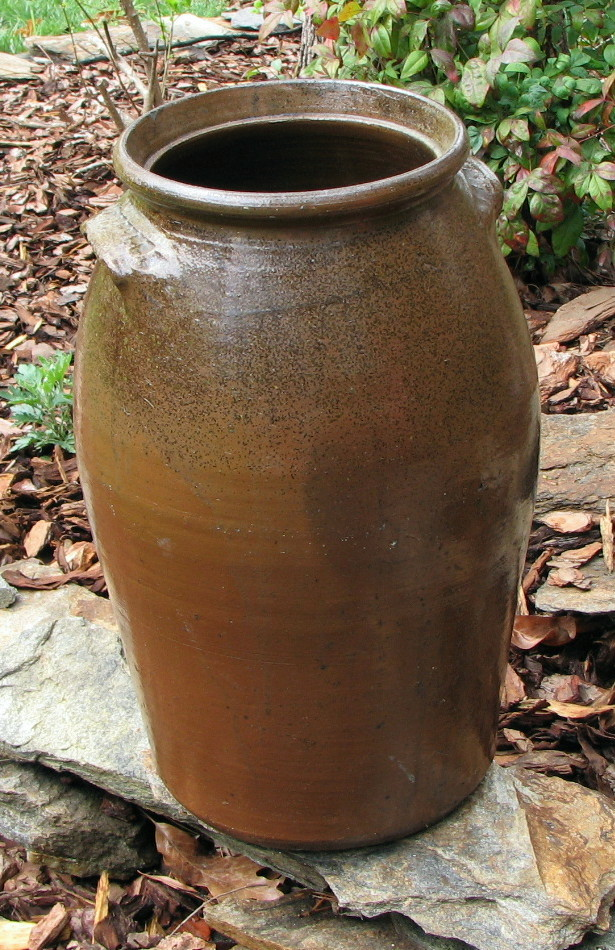
Alkaline glazed 4 gallon jar. Catawba Valley. C.1875

Catawba Valley Pottery describes alkaline glazed stoneware made in the Catawba River Valley of Western North Carolina from the early 19th century, as well as certain contemporary pottery made in the region utilizing traditional methods and forms.

The earliest Catawba Valley pottery was earthenware made by the Catawba people.

At the turn of the 20th century, the food industry began to rely increasingly on glass and canned food storage along with refrigeration. These innovations brought about a severe decline of the utilitarian pottery industry nationwide, including the pottery community in Catawba Valley. Potters who chose to continue the craft had to rely on tourism and an interest in handmade crafts fostered by the American Arts and Crafts movement. Innovations included decorative techniques such as "swirl ware"; pottery made by combining two or more different colors of clay.

== Glazing and firing methods ==
From the earliest known product, stoneware made in the Catawba Valley has been alkaline glazed. Alkaline glazes are made by combining hardwood ash or crushed glass with clay and water. Alkaline glazed stoneware takes on a brown or green color once fired in the kiln. Catawba Valley potters chose alkaline glazes over salt glaze, the predominant stoneware glaze used in America at the time. Potters enjoyed an abundance of wood ash from burning their kilns while salt deposits were not very plentiful in the Carolinas. Furthermore, salt was especially expensive during and after the Civil War.

The alkaline glazed ware was initially fired in what are known as "groundhog kilns". These kilns were a unique southern U.S. variation of climbing kilns built into hillsides, such as the Asian anagama. Semi-subterranean in construction, the groundhog kiln featured a door leading into a long, low passage of brick or rock construction, with a stack or chimney poking out of the ground uphill. Ware was loaded in the low passageway or "ware-bed" and the fire was built in a sunken firebox located just inside the door. The design allowed the stack to draw heated air, flames, and ash through the pottery grouped inside and created the draft needed to generate the intense heat required to create stoneware. This type of firing or "burning" worked particularly well with large pieces of pottery. Variations of these kilns, usually referred to as "tunnel kilns," are used by modern potters in Catawba Valley and other pottery regions in the American southeast.

== Modern Potters from the Region ==
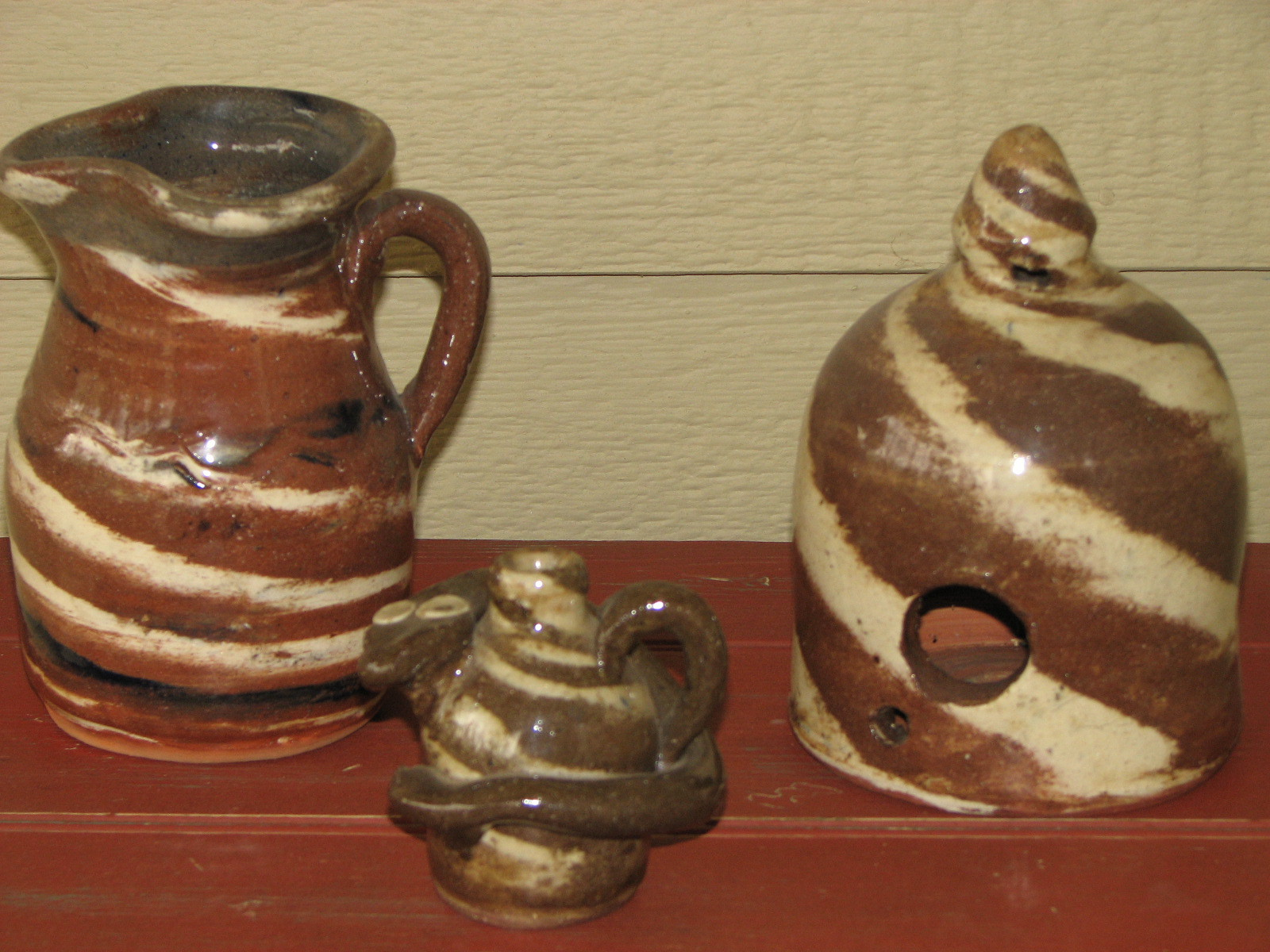
Burlon Craig Swirl Ware. Catawba Valley. C.2000

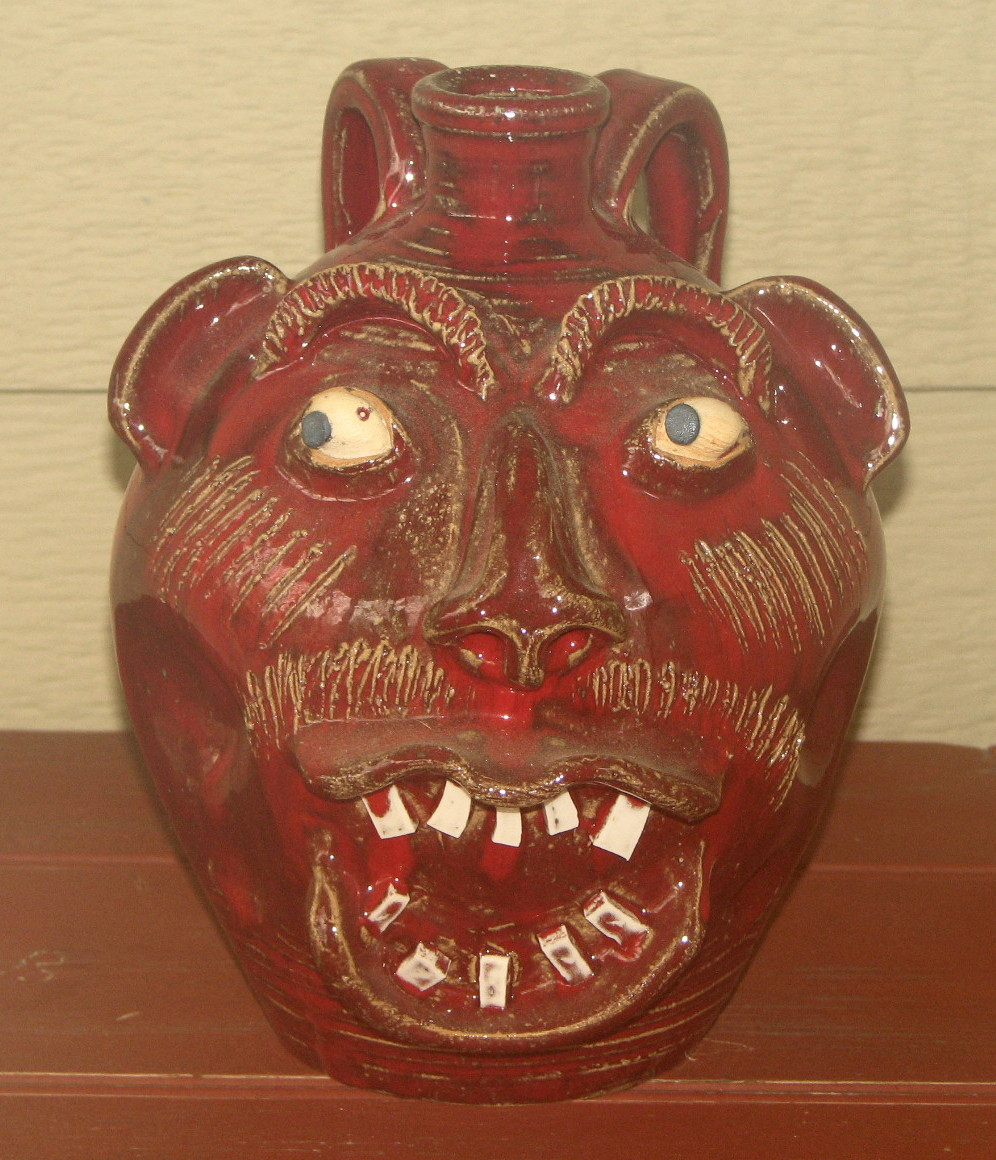
Charles Lisk Face Jug. Catawba Valley. 2004

An early recorded pottery in the Catawba Valley was operated by Daniel Seagle (ca.1805-1867) of Lincoln County. After Seagle's death, the pottery was operated by his son and various apprentices into the 1890s.

Other notable potteries of the 19th and early 20th centuries included those operated by the Hartzogs, the Hilton family, and brothers Harvey Ford Reinhardt and Enoch William Alexander Reinhardt.

Burlon B. Craig (ca. 1914-2002) was born in Lincoln County, North Carolina and learned to make pottery as a teenager. When Craig returned from service in the Navy following World War II, he purchased the Reinhardt farm and pottery complex in Vale, North Carolina. The pottery operation included a groundhog kiln and fully equipped shop. His pottery was featured in several publications and in 1981 examples of his work were added to the Smithsonian Institution collection. In 1984 he received the National Endowment for the Arts' National Heritage Fellowship. Craig continued to live and work in Vale until his death in 2002.

In 1981 Charles Lisk and his family moved to Vale and developed a friendship with his neighbor Burlon Craig who shared with him the techniques of the Catawba Valley pottery tradition. Lisk built his own groundhog kiln and began making alkaline glazed stoneware. He makes a variety of wares including the traditional swirl pottery and face jugs.

The Reinhardt-Craig House, Kiln and Pottery Shop was listed on the National Register of Historic Places in 2008.

== See also ==
- Anagama kiln
- Bartmann jug
- Pottery
