= Hobart Nichols =

American painter

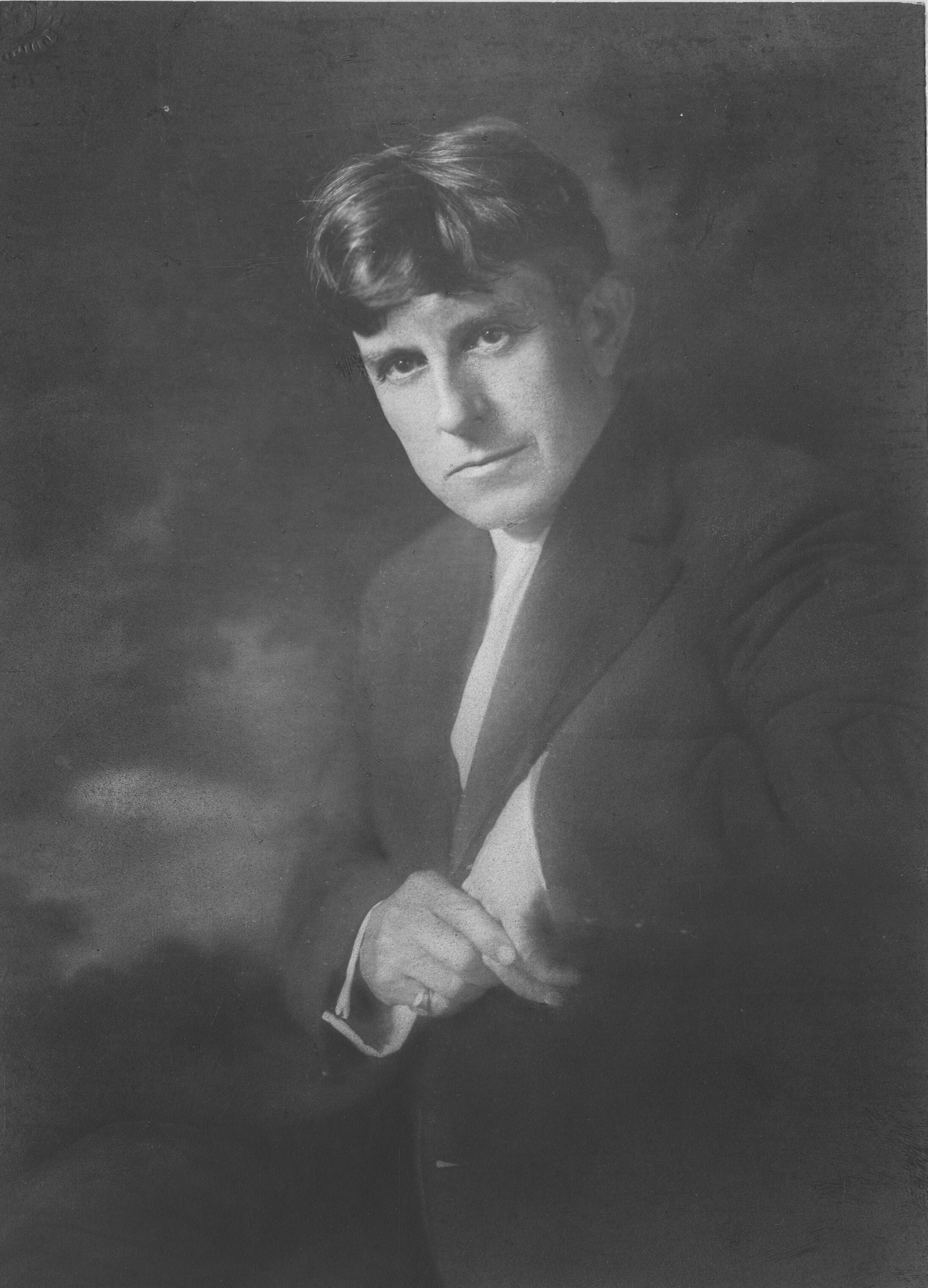
- Born: Henry Hobart Nichols Jr. May 1, 1869; Washington, DC, US
- Died: August 13, 1962 (aged 93); Bronxville, New York, US
- Education: Art Students League; Académie Julian
- Occupations: Painter, illustrator
- Spouse: Wilhelmina von Stosch

Henry Hobart Nichols Jr. (May 1, 1869 – August 13, 1962) was an American landscape painter and illustrator. Nichols was born to Henry Hobart and Indiana Jay Nichols on May 1, 1869, in Washington, DC.

He studied under Howard Hemlock and Edmund Clarence Messer at the Art Students League of Washington and later, completed in 1905, studies with Caludio Castelucho at the Académie Julian in Paris.

== Family ==
Nichols' father, Hobart Nichols Sr., was a noted wood engraver who engraved the sketches in The History of North American Birds by Baird, Brewer and Ridgeway. His mother, Indiana Jay Nichols was skilled at drawing and "interested in all things related to the arts." Hobart’s brother, Spencer Baird Nichols, was a portrait painter and illustrator.

Nichols married painter Wilhelmina von Stoschm also of Washington, DC, in 1895. They had two daughters, Hildegarde born 1896 and Leonora born in 1897. In 1908, the family moved to New York City. Then in 1910 they bought land in Lawrence Park a growing artists' colony in Bronxville, New York.

== Career ==
Nichols' began his career as an illustrator for the US Geological Survey where he remained for 15 years building his fine art career in his spare time. Ultimately he became known for his landscapes rendered in oil or watercolor. His grandniece, Barbara Sussman’s description of her great uncle's work repeats the themes of so many of his viewers through his long career “Hobart’s paintings are solid and well executed, and he seldom strayed from the winter landscapes in which he found so much interest in exploring the nuances of light on snow.”

Hobart Nichols was known as much for his leadership in the art community as he was for his painting. He was president of the National Academy of Art for ten years and exhibited there, the Salmagundi Club and Grand Central Galleries many times. Today, Nichols’ work is among the collections of the Metropolitan Museum of Art, the Smithsonian Institution, the National Gallery of Art, and the Phillips Collection.

Nearly blind, Nichols died in Bronxville on August 13, 1962, at the age of 93 – 12 years after the death of his younger brother Spencer, and eight years after the death of his wife.

== Awards ==
- Washington Water Color Club Prize – 1895, 1901
- Second Corcoran Prize, Society of Washington Artists – 1901
- Parsons Prize, Society of Washington Artists – 1902, 1904
- First Corcoran Prize, Society of Washington Artists – 1906
- Turnbull Prize, Salmagundi Club – 1913
- National Arts Club of New York bronze medal – 1914
- Evans Prize, Salmagundi Club – 1915
- Porter Prize, Salmagundi Club – 1918
- National Arts Club of New York silver medal – 1920
- Thompson Prize, Salmagundi Club – 1920
- Second Altman Prize at the National Academy of Design – 1923
- Vezin Prize, Salmagundi Club – 1924
- First Altman Prize at the National Academy of Design – 1925
- Isidor Prize, Salmagundi Club – 1926
- Members Purchase Prize, Salmagundi Club – 1927
- National Academy of Design Prize – 1928
- Gregg Memorial Prize, National Arts Club – 1930
- First Altman Prize at the National Academy of Design – 1934
- National Academy of Design Prize – 1935
- Henry B. Snope Prize, Society of American Etchers, Inc. – 1936
- Century Club Prize – 1938
- Salmagundi Club Prize – 1939

== Associations ==
- Allied Artists of America
- The American Water Color Society (president, 1936–1937)
- Artists for Victory, World War II (president)
- The Century Club, NY (board of management)
- Connecticut Academy of Fine Arts
- The Cosmos Club, Washington, DC
- Grand Central Art Galleries
- Louis Comfort Tiffany Foundation (director, 1934–1959)
- The Lotos Club of New York City
- National Academy of Design (president, 1939–1949)
- National Arts Club
- National Institute of Arts and Letters
- New York Water Color Club
- North Shore Art Association
- Pennsylvania Academy of Fine Arts
- Salmagundi Club, NY (president, 1922–1924)
- Society of Washington Artists
- Washington Water Color Club
