= Vale, Lincoln County, North Carolina =

Unincorporated community in North Carolina, US

Coordinates: 35°32′23″N 81°23′50″W

Vale is an unincorporated community in Lincoln County, North Carolina, United States. Parts of Vale extend to western Catawba County. It lies at an elevation of 1,028 feet (283 m). The area of Vale is nearly all rural, with farming the predominant industry.

By car, Vale is about 10 minutes from Cherryville, 15 minutes from Lincolnton, 30 minutes from Hickory and Morganton, and 55 minutes from Charlotte. It is one hour from the Appalachian mountains and around four hours from the coast.

Vale has a post office. Its ZIP code is 28168.

Vale is home to the annual Cat Square Christmas Parade, started in 1974, known as the "Best Little Christmas Parade in the Country". The parade festivities included electing the Mayor of Cat Square. The mayor is strictly a figurehead, with the only duty being riding in the parade.

Reinhardt-Craig House, Kiln and Pottery Shop was listed on the National Register of Historic Places in 2008.

Vale was the destination of 50 African American families during the Great Migration. Most migrated from Half Acre Township in Putnam County, Georgia. They established three migration churches and three black elementary schools.

== Notable people ==
- Vance Havner, evangelist and author
- Joe L. Kiser, member of the North Carolina General Assembly
- Minnie Reinhardt, naïve painter
