= Haplogroup R-S1194 =

Human Y-chromosome DNA haplogroup

- Possible time of origin: Late Neolithic / Early Bronze Age
- Possible place of origin: Central Europe
- Ancestor: R-L151
- Descendants: R-A8039; R-CTS4528 (R-S1200)
- Defining mutations: S1194
- Highest frequencies: Dutch, Luxembourgers, English, Germans, Swiss, Danes, Belgians, Scottish, Irish, Afrikaners

Haplogroup R-S1194 (also known as R1b-S1194 and designated R1b1a1b1a1a3 by the ISOGG) is a human Y-chromosome paternal lineage. It is a primary descendant paternal lineage of R-L151 (R-L11), sibling to the major Western European patrilineal clades R-P312 (R-S116) and R-U106 (R-S21).

The R-S1194 paternal lineage descends from a single male ancestor who lived in Central Europe during the transition from the Late Neolithic to the Early Bronze Age, within the Corded Ware culture and Bell Beaker culture horizons. From this common paternal ancestor, the patriline divided immediately into two primary paternal branches, R-A8039 and R-CTS4528 (also designated R-S1200). Both branches are found in the European archaeological record from the Bronze Age and Iron Age onward.

Among modern populations, patrilineal descendants of R-S1194 live mainly in Northwestern and Central Europe, where they account for roughly 1% to 2% of native paternal lines in the Netherlands, Luxembourg, England, Germany, Switzerland, Denmark, and Belgium. The paternal lineage also occurs in diaspora populations in North America, Southern Africa, and Oceania, while rare basal paternal lines have been recorded in North Africa.

== Origins ==
All members of R-S1194 share patrilineal descent from a common male-line ancestor within R-L151 defined by the S1194 single-nucleotide polymorphism (SNP) on the Y chromosome (GRCh38 position chrY:14431400, a C to T mutation).

In a 2021 phylogenetic study comparing the five primary paternal lineages descending from R-L151, Iain McDonald noted that R-S1194 has an unusual early branching structure. Separated from the ancestral R-L151 patriline by a single mutational step, R-S1194 divided immediately into two main paternal branches: R-A8039 and R-CTS4528 (R-S1200). Over its first ten mutational generations after the breakup of R-L151, the R-S1194 paternal lineage expanded at nearly the same rate as R-U106 and produced at least 35 distinct Early Bronze Age paternal sub-lineages.

During the Early Bronze Age, patrilineal descendants of R-S1194 lived along the Danube corridor of Lower Austria within the Únětice culture. By the Iron Age, Roman Imperial period, and Migration Period, its paternal branches had spread among both Celtic (La Tène culture and British Iron Age) and Germanic (North Sea, Frankish, Anglo-Saxon, and Longobard) populations.

== Primary branches and subclades ==
The R-S1194 patriline splits at its root into two primary paternal branches, R-A8039 and R-CTS4528 (R-S1200):

=== R-A8039 ===
R-A8039 is one of the two primary ancestral paternal branches of R-S1194 and contains the oldest sequenced ancient remains in the haplogroup. It divides into three main paternal sub-lineages:

- R-A8040 is the most geographically widespread paternal branch of R-A8039, with patrilineal descendants native to Western and Central Europe (Belgium, France, Switzerland, Germany, Great Britain, Ireland, and Scandinavia) as well as North America, South Africa, and North Africa. R-A8040 has three principal downstream paternal lineages:
  - R-BY46010 branches directly off R-A8040 and is concentrated around the North Sea basin and the Low Countries, with ancestral paternal lines in Belgium (Flanders), northern France, Great Britain, and Northern Ireland. The R-BY46010 patriline divides into two sub-lineages:
    - R-FTJ77000 is a collateral paternal branch under R-BY46010.
    - R-BY56486 is the largest paternal sub-branch of R-BY46010. In addition to rare basal (R-BY56486*) paternal lineages that diverge above the main clusters, R-BY56486 splits into two primary paternal sub-lineages:
      - R-FT256859 (R-FT256859 > R-FTA60528 > R-FTG33953) occurs in Flanders (Belgium), Great Britain, and South Africa, where it is the patrilineal Van der Westhuizen family line established at the Cape of Good Hope in 1662.
      - R-BY14094 (R-BY14094 > R-BY47193 > R-BY46796 > R-BY67373 and R-FTE4139) is found on paternal lines in Northern Ireland, Scotland, England, and North America, including the Sloan / Sloane surname patriline.
  - R-A8045 (also designated R-Y247861) is distributed across Switzerland, Germany, the Low Countries, and the British Isles. Its sub-branch R-BY12548 is the parent of R-BY56542 (the ancestral paternal lineage of the Swiss-German Fahrni / Forney family from Steffisburg and Eriz, Canton Bern) and R-BY62657, while its sibling paternal branch R-BY67474 (R-BY67474 > R-BY96555 > R-BY70406) occurs in Northwestern Europe.
  - R-A8041 (also designated R-A8043) has been identified in ancient Iron Age and Roman-era European remains (sample I42805) and in modern Northwestern Europe. Its downstream paternal branch R-BY11764 splits into R-FT381000 (found in early modern burials on Sandoy in the Faroe Islands) and R-BY11762 (which includes R-BY55837 > R-Y63748 and the Fox patrilineal surname cluster under R-BY61280).
- R-BY74124 (and downstream R-BY73108) is a paternal lineage found mainly in England, Scotland, Ireland, and Northern Ireland. Its main branches, R-Y112358 > R-BY69748 > R-FT113739 and R-FT64428 > R-FT64327, include the Hetherington / Etherington / Harrington patrilineal surname cluster.
- R-BY48129 is a Central European paternal lineage present in the Early Bronze Age Únětice culture of Lower Austria (Unterhautzenthal 28), with modern patrilineal descendants in R-BY14091 > R-BY106450.

=== R-CTS4528 (R-S1200) ===
R-CTS4528 (designated R-S1200 on the YFull tree, and formerly known by the marker DF100) is the second primary ancestral paternal branch of R-S1194. It has seven immediate paternal sub-lineages:

- R-S14328 is the largest paternal branch of R-CTS4528 and divides into two main sub-lineages:
  - R-A8469 includes R-S1196, which splits into R-S6868 (found in Great Britain, Germany, and Flanders, and carried as the paternal lineage of the Adams political family under R-FGC23892 and by medieval Sint-Truiden individual 0064 under R-CTS7141) and R-S1199 (found in Iron Age, Anglo-Saxon, and medieval Cambridgeshire, England, as well as in Germany and Switzerland). A sibling paternal branch under R-A8469, R-SZ5489 (R-SZ5489 > R-Y28597 > R-S10242), occurs in the Netherlands and around the North Sea and includes the patrilineal line of Thomas Edison.
  - R-Y126578 is a paternal lineage distributed across England, Denmark, Sweden, and Germany. It divides into R-Y196519 (R-Y196519 > R-Y16483) and R-Y107097 (R-Y107097 > R-BY14093 > R-BY38492).
- R-A8472 is a Continental European paternal lineage with three branches: R-S22519 (present among 6th-century Longobard burials at Collegno in Piedmont, Italy), R-S11481 (including R-S21770 and R-BY164621, found in medieval Flanders at Sint-Truiden), and R-BY14092 (R-BY14092 > R-Y64294 and R-FT182489).
- R-BY38950, R-FGC41234, R-Y132882, R-FTA50002, and R-FTE97748 are smaller basal paternal sub-lineages found in Great Britain, Germany, and Western Europe.

== Archaeological testing ==
=== Early Bronze Age ===
The oldest archaeological specimen known to belong to the R-S1194 paternal lineage is Unterhautzenthal 28, excavated from an Early Bronze Age Únětice culture settlement and cemetery at Sierndorf, north of the Danube in Lower Austria. This male carried the R-S1194 > R-A8039 > R-BY48129 paternal line. (Note: On commercial databases such as FamilyTreeDNA Discover, a Late Neolithic/Bell Beaker transition individual from Bréviandes near Troyes, France (Bréviandes 445-HI) is listed as an upstream relative of R-S1194 bearers; however, Bréviandes 445-HI belongs to the parent paternal clade R-L151 and is ancestral (negative) for S1194.)

=== Iron Age ===
Both primary paternal branches of R-S1194 appear in pre-Roman burials from Continental La Tène Celtic sites and British Iron Age cemeteries. An Early La Tène elite burial at Bucy-le-Long, Aisne, in northern France (Bucy-le-Long 22445 / CGG_2_022445), belonged to the R-S1194 > R-CTS4528 > R-S14328 > R-A8469 > R-S1196 paternal lineage and maternal haplogroup J1c1. Two La Tène period Celtic males excavated at Kópháza-Széles-földek near Sopron in Győr-Moson-Sopron County, western Hungary (Kópháza samples I18835 and I18838), also carried the R-S1194 > R-CTS4528 paternal lineage, alongside maternal haplogroups K1a1a and T2c1+146. The sibling branch is represented by sample I42805, a Late Iron Age or Early Roman European individual in the Allen Ancient DNA Resource (AADR) dataset who carried the R-S1194 > R-A8039 > R-A8040 > R-A8041 paternal line.

Three Iron Age specimens have been sequenced from Britain. The Middle Iron Age "Slonk Hill Man" (sample I7632), buried on a bed of mussel shells in a storage pit at Slonk Hill near Brighton, East Sussex, belonged to the R-S1194 > R-CTS4528 paternal lineage (mtDNA H1e). At Burnby Lane, Pocklington, in the East Riding of Yorkshire, an Iron Age male from the Arras culture chariot-burial horizon (sample I21617) carried R-S1194 > R-CTS4528 > R-FT416732 > R-FTE49529. A third individual from a Late Iron Age or early Roman burial at Duxford, Cambridgeshire (Duxford 10), belonged to the R-S1194 > R-CTS4528 > R-S14328 > R-A8469 > R-S1196 > R-S1199 paternal lineage.

=== Roman era and Migration Period ===
Remains carrying R-S1194 paternal lineages from the Roman Imperial and Germanic Migration periods have been excavated along the Rhine frontier, in Denmark, in Anglo-Saxon England, and in Longobard Italy. An individual buried along the Lower Germanic Limes on the Old Rhine at Valkenburg Marktveld (Valkenburg, South Holland, Netherlands; CGG_2_107758 / CL048) belonged to R-S1194 > R-CTS4528 > R-S14328 > R-A8469 > R-S1196. A Late Iron Age or Migration Period burial from Vester Egesborg on Zealand, Denmark (CGG_2_107506), belonged to R-S1194 > R-CTS4528 > R-S14328.

During the 5th to 7th centuries, an Anglo-Saxon cemetery burial at Hatherdene Close in Cherry Hinton, Cambridgeshire (HAD017 / Hatherdene 17), carried the R-S1194 > R-CTS4528 > R-S14328 > R-A8469 > R-S1196 > R-S1199 paternal line (mtDNA H4a1a1a22). A 5th–8th century Merovingian-era Frankish row-grave burial at Alt-Inden (Inden, North Rhine-Westphalia, Germany; IND005 / Alt-Inden 5) belonged to R-S1194 > R-CTS4528 > R-S14328 > R-A8469 > R-S1196. Further south, six males buried in the late 6th–7th century Longobard (Lombard) cemetery at Collegno, near Turin in Piedmont, Italy (samples CL92, CL93, CL128, CL145, CL146, and CL150), formed an elite patrilineal kin group within R-S1194 > R-CTS4528 > R-A8472. Five of these men (CL92, CL93, CL128, CL145, and CL150) shared the downstream R-S22519 paternal branch, including a first-generation migrant father (CL93, mtDNA J2b1a) and his locally born son (CL92, mtDNA H), while a sixth patrilineal relative (CL146, mtDNA T2b3) belonged to a collateral paternal line under R-A8472.

=== Viking Age, medieval, and early modern periods ===
An 8th-century burial from the Late Avar Khaganate in Hungary (sample I27176) with a Central European autosomal profile carried the R-S1194 > R-CTS4528 paternal lineage. From Viking-Age England, one of the executed men (Oxford 19) recovered from the 10th–early 11th century mass burial ditch at St John's College, Oxford, linked to the St. Brice's Day massacre of Danes ordered by King Æthelred the Unready in 1002 CE, belonged to R-S1194 > R-CTS4528 > R-FT219032. (Note: Another Viking-Age specimen from the Margaryan et al. (2020) study, VK40 (Sweden_Skara 106 from Varnhem, Västergötland, Sweden), is sometimes mislisted under R-S1194 > R-A8039 > R-A8040 on automated third-party websites because of a recurrent mutation at site Y247861 (G to T). In the original publication (Margaryan et al. 2020, Supplementary Table 1), as well as on YFull and FamilyTreeDNA, VK40 belongs to R1b-U152 (R1b1a1b1a1a2b1c1b, specifically R-U152 > R-L2 > R-Z49 > R-Z142 > R-Z12222 > R-BY1701 > R-BY166438).)

Two medieval townsmen from 8th–13th century Sint-Truiden in Limburg, Flanders, Belgium, also carried R-S1194 paternal lineages: Sint-Truiden 64 (0064, Early to High Medieval) belonged to R-S1194 > R-CTS4528 > R-S14328 > R-A8469 > R-S1196 > R-S6868 > R-CTS7141, and Sint-Truiden 2054 (2054, High Medieval) belonged to R-S1194 > R-CTS4528 > R-A8472 > R-S11481 > R-BY164621. A 13th–15th century burial (St. Johns 196) from the cemetery of the Hospital of St John the Evangelist, Cambridge (later the site of St John's College, Cambridge) carried R-S1194 > R-CTS4528 > R-S14328 > R-A8469 > R-S1196 > R-S1199. In the Faroe Islands, two 16th–17th century brothers (VK25 / Faroe 1 and VK234 / Faroe 2) buried at Sandur Church on Sandoy shared maternal haplogroup H3a1a and the paternal lineage R-S1194 > R-A8039 > R-A8040 > R-A8041 > R-BY11764 > R-FT381000.

== Prominent members and documented lineages ==
Y-chromosome testing of documented male-line descendants in surname and haplogroup projects has identified the R-S1194 paternal lineages of several historical families:

=== Adams political family (R-FGC23892) ===
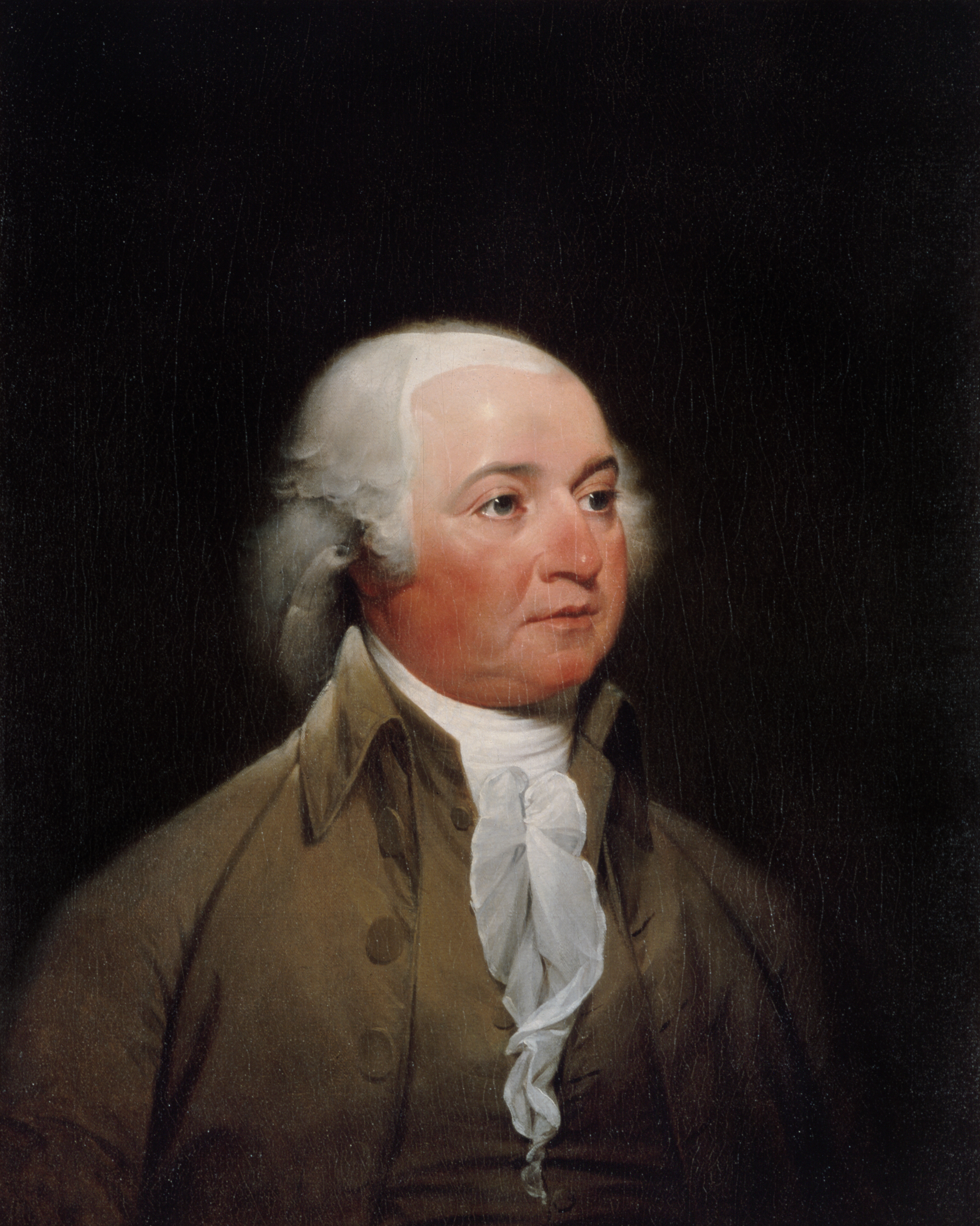
John Adams (1735–1826), 2nd President of the United States (R-FGC23892)

Patrilineal descendants of the English-born Massachusetts colonist Henry Adams of Braintree (1583–1646, born in Barton St David, Somerset, England) belong to the R-S1194 > R-CTS4528 > R-S14328 > R-A8469 > R-S1196 > R-S6868 > R-FGC23892 paternal lineage. Members of the Adams political family on this patriline include:

- John Adams (1735–1826), American Founding Father, primary author of the Constitution of Massachusetts, 1st vice president of the United States (1789–1797), and 2nd president of the United States (1797–1801).
- John Quincy Adams (1767–1848), American diplomat, 8th United States secretary of state (1817–1825), 6th president of the United States (1825–1829), and U.S. representative from Massachusetts (eldest son of John Adams).
- Samuel Adams (1722–1803), American statesman, Founding Father, leader of the Sons of Liberty, signatory of the Declaration of Independence, and 4th governor of Massachusetts (second cousin of John Adams).
- Charles Francis Adams Sr. (1807–1886), U.S. representative from Massachusetts and U.S. minister to the United Kingdom during the American Civil War (son of John Quincy Adams).
- Henry Adams (1838–1918), American historian, journalist, and Pulitzer Prize-winning author of The Education of Henry Adams (son of Charles Francis Adams Sr.).
- Charles Francis Adams III (1866–1954), 44th United States secretary of the Navy (1929–1933) and yachtsman (great-grandson of John Quincy Adams).

=== Thomas Alva Edison (R-S10242) ===
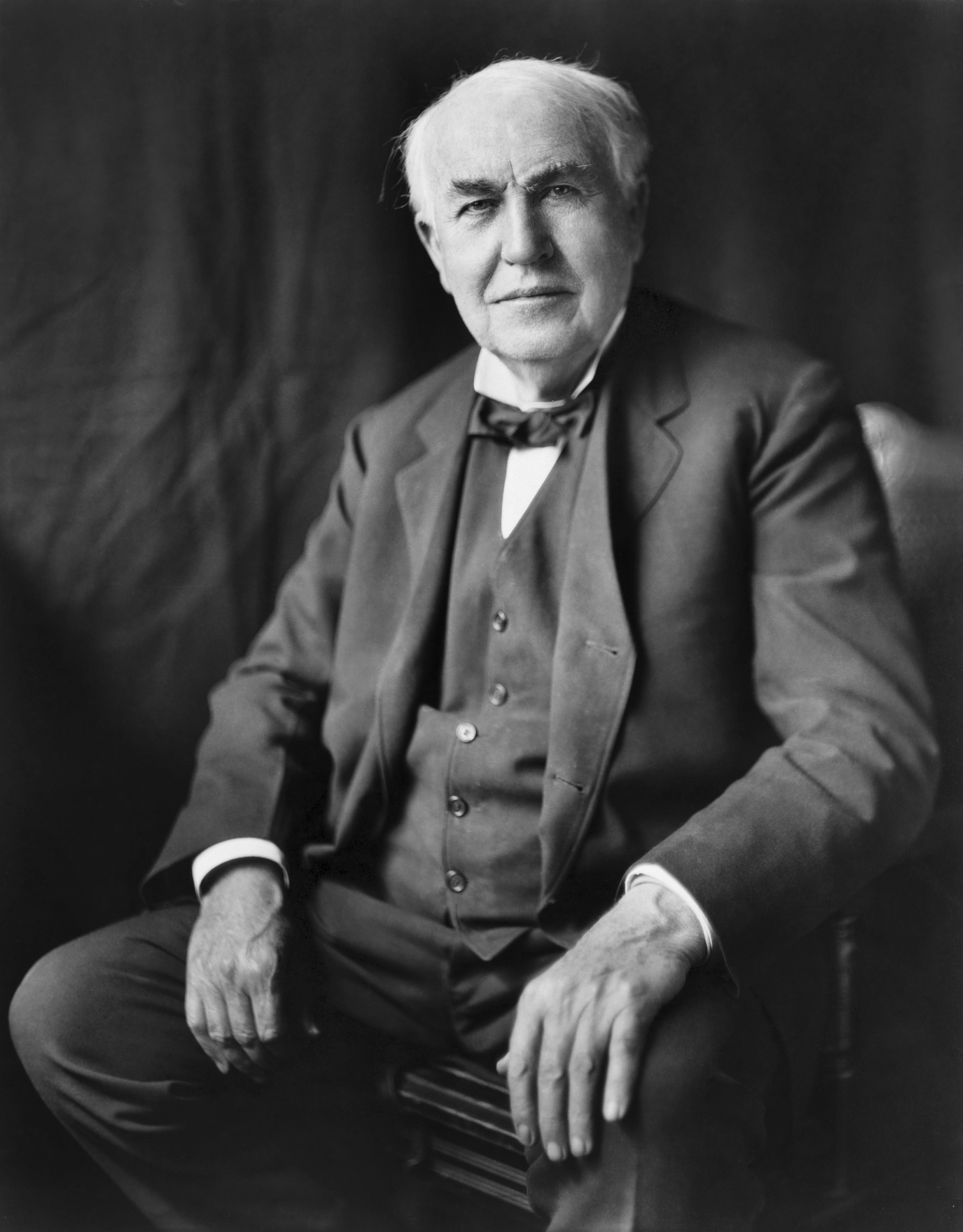
Thomas Edison (1847–1931), American inventor (R-S10242)

Patrilineal descendants of the Loyalist colonist John Edison (c. 1727–1814), a Dutch-American who settled in New Jersey before relocating to Digby, Nova Scotia, and Bayham, Ontario, carry the R-S1194 > R-CTS4528 > R-S14328 > R-A8469 > R-SZ5489 > R-Y28597 > R-S10242 paternal lineage. John Edison was the patrilineal great-grandfather of the American inventor and businessman Thomas Edison (1847–1931).

=== Forney / Fahrni family (R-BY56542) ===
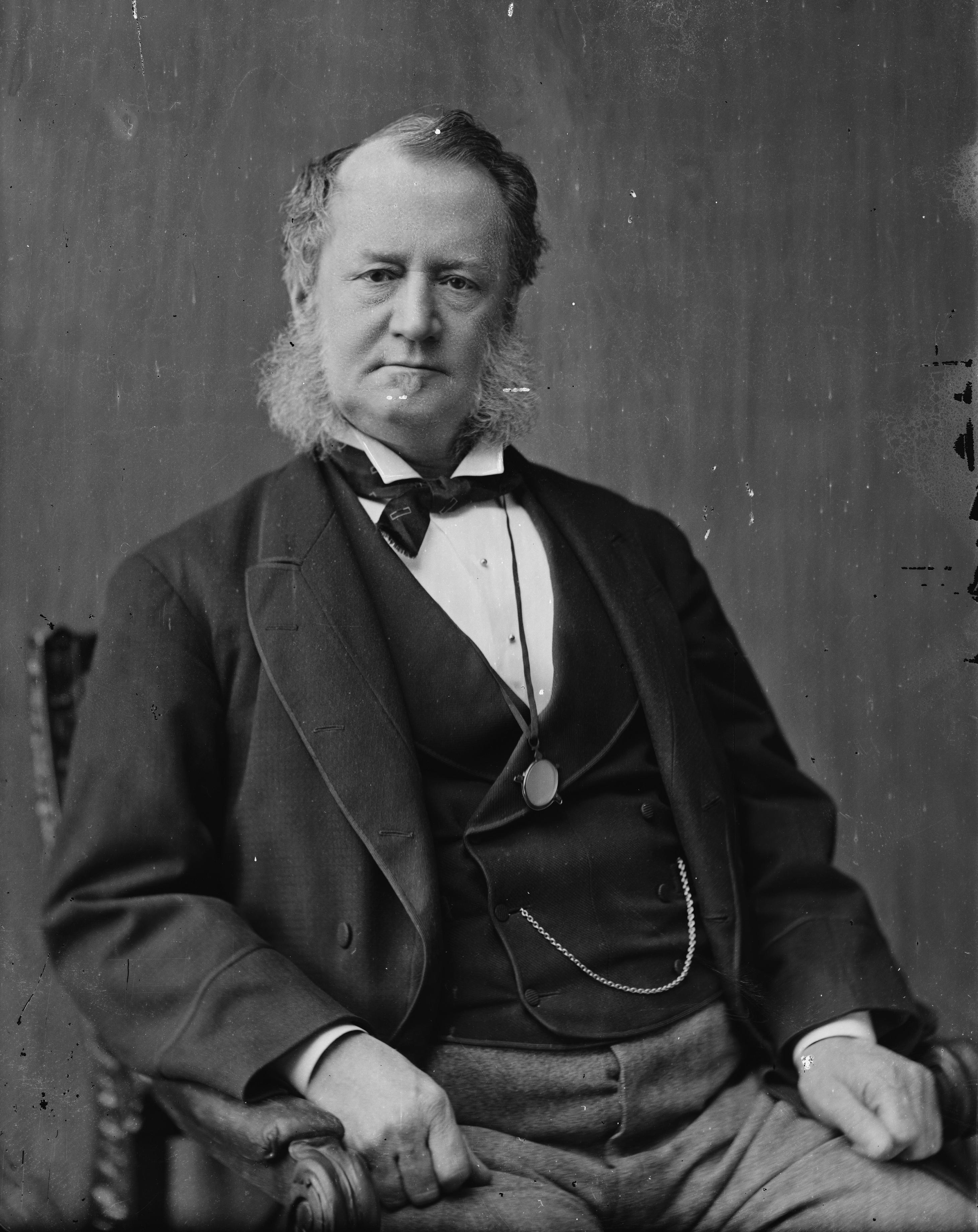
John Weiss Forney (1817–1881), publisher and Secretary of the U.S. Senate (R-BY56542)

The major colonial American Forney (and Fahrney) patrilineal branches (including the lines of Lancaster County, York County/Hanover, and Somerset County in Pennsylvania, as well as Lincoln County in North Carolina) descend on the paternal line from Christanus von Farne (b. c. 1532 in Eriz / Steffisburg, Canton Bern, Switzerland) and his great-grandson Ulrich Farni (b. 1606). This paternal family line belongs to R-S1194 > R-A8039 > R-A8040 > R-A8045 > R-BY12548 > R-BY56542 and carries a multi-copy duplication at STR marker DYS19 = 14–15. Y-DNA testing of the Southern paternal branch descended from the North Carolina pioneer Jacob Forney Sr. (Hans Jacob Farni, 1721–1806) also refuted a 19th-century family tradition that he was a French Huguenot; instead, he was a patrilineal Swiss-German Fahrni kinsman of the Pennsylvania Forneys. Patrilineal members of this lineage include:

- Peter Forney (1756–1834), American Revolutionary War general, ironmaster, and U.S. Representative from North Carolina (son of Jacob Forney Sr.).
- Daniel Munroe Forney (1784–1847), War of 1812 major and U.S. Representative from North Carolina (eldest son of General Peter Forney).
- John Weiss Forney (born John Wien Forney, 1817–1881), American newspaper publisher, Clerk of the United States House of Representatives, and Secretary of the United States Senate, of the Lancaster County branch (and father of writer and journalist Tillie May Forney, 1862–1922).
- William H. Forney (1823–1894), Confederate States Army brigadier general and U.S. Representative from Alabama (grandson of Jacob Forney Sr.).
- John H. Forney (1829–1902), Confederate States Army major general in the American Civil War (younger brother of William H. Forney).
- Matthias N. Forney (1835–1908), American mechanical engineer, publisher, and inventor of the Forney locomotive (great-great-grandson of Hanover, Pennsylvania founder Johann Adam Forney, 1690–1752).
- James Forney (1844–1921), United States Marine Corps brigadier general and recipient of the Marine Corps Brevet Medal (eldest son of John Weiss Forney).

=== Descendants of Pieter Jansz van der Westhuizen (R-FTA60528) ===
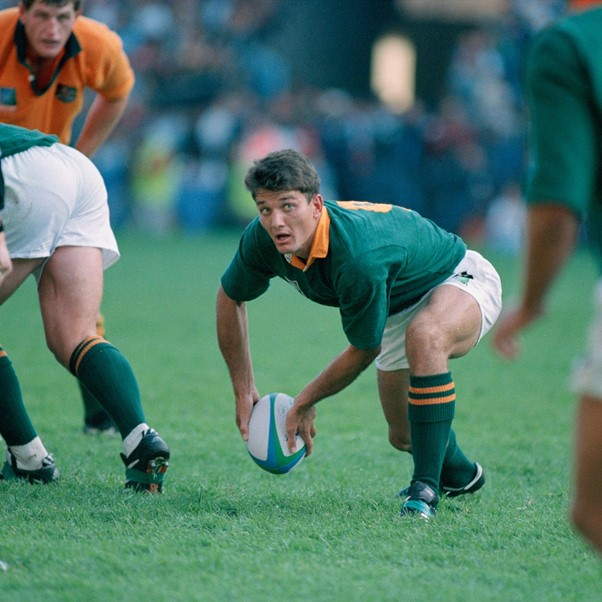
Joost van der Westhuizen playing for the Springboks during the 1995 Rugby World Cup.

Pieter Jansz van der Westhuizen, a native of Bruges (Westhuysen), Flanders, arrived at the Cape of Good Hope in 1662 as a soldier for the Dutch East India Company, became a free burgher in 1670, and married Maria Hendriksz Winkelhausen in 1673. He was the colonial male progenitor (stamvader) of the patrilineal Afrikaner Van der Westhuizen family, whose members include Springbok rugby union captain Joost van der Westhuizen (1971–2017) and Constitutional Court justice Johann van der Westhuizen (born 1952). Tested patrilineal descendants across the branches of Pieter Jansz van der Westhuizen belong to the paternal subclade R-S1194 > R-A8039 > R-A8040 > R-BY46010 > R-BY56486 > R-FT256859 > R-FTA60528.

== See also ==
- Haplogroup R1b
- Haplogroup R-M269
- Haplogroup R-L151
- Haplogroup R-P312
- Haplogroup R-U106
- Haplogroup R-L21
- Haplogroup R-DF27
- Y-DNA haplogroups in populations of Europe
