= Forney =

Forney could refer to:

== People ==
- Alva Clark Forney, lieutenant governor of South Dakota
- Daniel Munroe Forney, US Representative from North Carolina
- David Forney, American electrical engineer
- Ellen Forney, American cartoonist and educator
- James Forney, recipient of the Marine Corps Brevet Medal
- John H. Forney (1829-1902), American Confederate general in the Civil War
- John Weiss Forney (1817-1881), American journalist and politician
- Kynan Forney, former American football player
- Matthias N. Forney (1835-1908), US steam locomotive manufacturer
- Peter Forney, US Representative from North Carolina
- Tillie May Forney (1862-1922), American writer and journalist
- William H. Forney, US Representative from Alabama

== Places ==
- Forney, Texas
  - Forney Independent School District, school district based in Forney
  - Forney High School, in Forney, Texas
  - North Forney High School, in Forney, Texas
- Waynesville Regional Airport at Forney Field, formerly known as Forney Army Airfield
- Forney Ridge Trail, an American hiking trail
- Forney Transportation Museum, Denver, Colorado

== Things ==
- Forney Aircoupe, a variant of the low wing metal monoplane ERCO Ercoupe
- Forney locomotive, a steam locomotive built to the design of Matthias N. Forney
- Forney algorithm, for calculating the error values at known error locations

== See also ==
- Johann Heinrich Samuel Formey (1711-1797), German author who wrote in French as journalist, editor and encyclopedist
