= Celtic race =

In historical literature, the term "Celtic race" (or "Celtic Race") may refer to:

- in physical anthropology, the Mediterranean race (William Rhind 1851)
- in cultural anthropology or ethnology, the Celtic peoples
  - more specifically, the Insular Celts (e.g. Rolleston 1911)
