= Thelma Davidson Adair =

American civil rights activist (1920–2024)

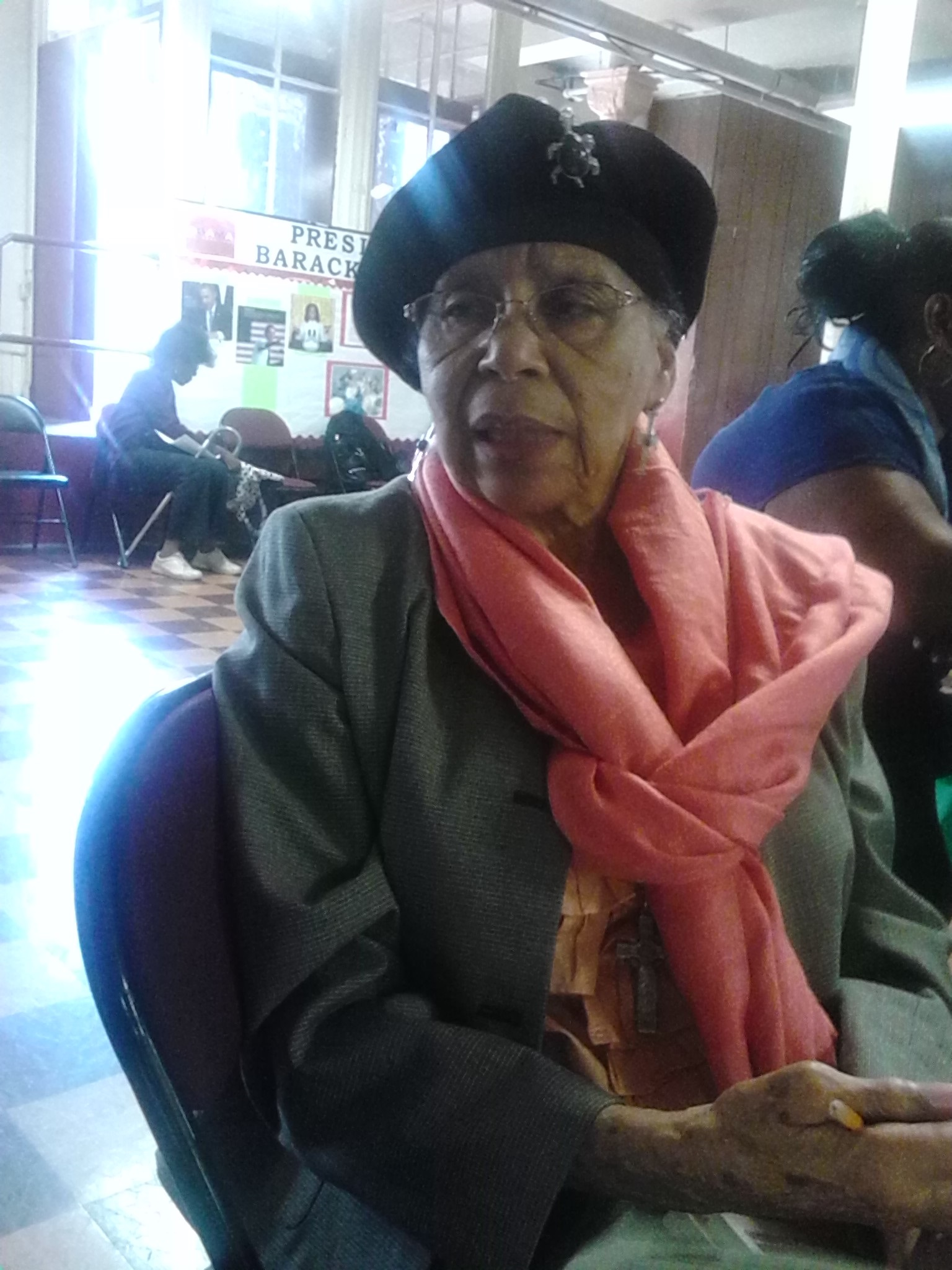
- Davidson Adair in 2015
- Born: Thelma Cornelia Davidson; August 29, 1920; Iron Station, North Carolina, U.S.
- Died: August 21, 2024 (aged 103)
- Education: Barber–Scotia College; Bennett College; Teachers College, Columbia University
- Occupations: Presbyterian church leader, educator, social advocate/activist, and writer
- Spouse: Arthur Adair (m. 1940; died 1979)

Thelma Cornelia Davidson Adair (August 29, 1920 – August 21, 2024) was an American educator, Presbyterian church leader, advocate for human rights, peace and justice issues, writer and activist. She was active with Church Women United, a Christian women's advocacy movement. Davidson Adair was an ordained Elder for the Mount Morris Ascension Presbyterian Church of New York City in Harlem. Adair was the moderator for the 1976 Assembly United Presbyterian Church in the United States of America (UPCUSA). She married, in 1940, the Reverend Arthur Eugene Adair, founder and minister of the church from 1943 until his death in 1979.

Adair was an advocate for early childhood education and helped to establish Head Start programs in Harlem. She lived in Harlem since 1942 and was professor emeritus of Queens College, a CUNY college.

== Early life and education ==
Adair was born Thelma Cornelia Davidson in 1920 in Iron Station, North Carolina, one of six children. She lived there while in elementary school. Her family subsequently moved to Kings Mountain, North Carolina. She married Reverend Dr. Arthur Eugene Adair and they moved to New York City in 1942. He became a Senior Pastor of Mount Morris United Presbyterian Church (UPC).

Adair was an affiliated graduate from Barber–Scotia College (Concord, North Carolina) and Bennett College (Greensboro, North Carolina). She earned a master's degree and Doctorate of Education from Teachers College, Columbia University.

== World War II ==
Like many African Americans and Americans, Adair participated in the World War II efforts at home and abroad. She worked in a war plant. She inspected radar tubes. She was also a young mother at the time. She described her experience:

This was a period of perhaps the greatest number of lynchings. Everything was separate. Total restrictions. And at every moment you could be humiliated just because of color.

Despite the denial, despite the tragedy, despite the suffering, black folks, colored folks, Negro, Afro-Americans, claim America. This was your country, and so the loyalty, and this is the mystery of it all, was so strong that you never, even as we worked in war plants, even as we brought our crippled back, even as we buried our dead and got flags – we were not fighting for someone else. We too were America, and we only wanted the chance and the opportunity that we could have to sit at the table.

== Career ==
Adair was an organizer for West Harlem Head Start Programs. In 1944 she was an organizer for Mt. Morris UPC's Project Uplift, a precursor to the Arthur Eugene and Thelma Adair Community Life Center Head Start. The center services more than 250 children throughout various locations in Harlem. Adair has published and written numerous articles on early childhood education. Her publications are authoritative guides for early childhood educators throughout the United States.

In 1976, Adair was elected as a Moderator of the General Assembly for the Presbyterian Church, the first black woman to attain this role, travelling to 115 countries during her term. She was one of the original founders of Presbyterian Senior Services, and was a participant with the Fellowship of the "Least Coin", a worldwide prayer movement. She was president of Church Women United from 1980 to 1984.

== Later life and death ==
She was honored in 2011 by Congressman Charles Rangel. She attended the Selma, Alabama, 50th anniversary of the Selma to Montgomery marches across the Edmund Pettus Bridge.

Adair died on August 21, 2024, at the age of 103.

== Awards ==
- The Thelma C. Adair Award on Presbyterian Senior Services
- Barber-Scotia Alumni Award for Meritorious Service in the Field of Education
- Columbia University, Teacher's College Distinguished Alumni Award
- United Negro College Fund Distinguished Award for Outstanding Service and Commitment of Higher Education
- 1986 Recipient of Women of Faith Award from the Presbyterian Church
- 1991 Recipient of National Association of Presbyterian Clergywomen Women of Faith Awards
- 2008 Recipient of the Medal of Distinction Barnard College
- 2011 recipient of the Maggie Kuhn Presbyterian Church Award
