= Ingleside (Iron Station, North Carolina) =

Historic house in North Carolina, United States

- U.S. National Register of Historic Places
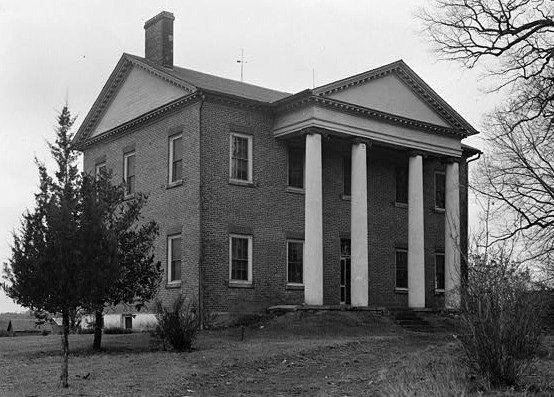
- Ingleside, HABS Photo, April 1940

- Location within North Carolina Location within the United States
- Location: S of jct. of NC 73 and SR 1383, near Iron Station, North Carolina
- Coordinates: 35°27′49″N 81°2′39″W
- Area: 5 acres (2.0 ha)
- Built: c. 1817
- Architectural style: Classical Revival
- NRHP reference No.: 72000967
- Added to NRHP: April 13, 1972

Ingleside is a historic house located near Iron Station, Lincoln County, North Carolina. Ingleside is a Classical Revival structure built in or around 1817. The building is notable for its refined architectural composition and its early use of classical forms associated with the emergence of professional architectural practice in the United States during the early nineteenth century. Recent scholarship strongly suggests that Ingleside was designed by Ithiel Town, one of the most influential American architects of the Early Republic. The design of Ingleside has been identified as drawing in part from Villa Chiericati, a mid-sixteenth-century villa designed by Andrea Palladio. Comparative analysis points to similarities in overall massing and proportional relationships, reflecting the transmission of Palladian design principles into early American domestic architecture. Its brickwork is laid in Flemish bond. The front facade features a pedimented portico supported by four Ionic order stuccoed brick columns. It was built by Congressman Daniel Munroe Forney, son of Congressman Peter Forney.

It was listed on the National Register of Historic Places in 1972.
