= Van der Westhuizen v Arnold =

South African legal case

Van der Westhuizen v Arnold is an important case in South African contract law, heard in the Supreme Court of Appeal on 22 February 2002, with judgment handed down on 29 August.

== Facts ==
The respondent, Johan Heinrich Arnold, had signed an agreement of sale for a motor vehicle which provided that "no warranty whatsoever has been or is given to me by the seller or his agent(s)." The agreement had been drawn up by the appellant, Gideon Andries van der Westhuizen, the seller. Arnold had been aware when he purchased the vehicle that it was in need of repair. The discussions between Arnold and Van der Westhuizen, prior to the conclusion of the contract, had related to the condition of the vehicle.

Subsequent to Arnold's taking possession of the vehicle, a bank claimed ownership of it. To avoid the bank's claim, Arnold paid the bank the amount outstanding to it. He then claimed that amount from Van der Westhuizen, basing his claim on the implied warranty against eviction. Van der Westhuizen raised the exclusion clause in defence of the claim.

== Judgment ==
On appeal, the court held (per Lewis AJA), that the surrounding circumstances—what passed between the parties, their negotiations and their conduct—did not show that the words "no warranty whatsoever" had included the implied warranty against eviction. Although the phrase had to be regarded at first blush as a complete catch-all, saving the seller from any liability that might have arisen by operation of law, or by virtue of representations or warranties, it could not, given its generality, and the absence of any evidence that the question of title had been considered or in contemplation, have excluded the most fundamental obligation of the seller: to give undisturbed possession of the merx to the buyer. The only inference to be drawn from the circumstances was that Arnold had not intended or even contemplated that he might be deprived of possession by the true owner, and yet have no recourse to Van der Westhuizen. The evidence did not show that Van der Westhuizen had any such liability in mind either. In the circumstances, then, the provision in the document that Van der Westhuizen had given no warranties whatsoever did not exclude his liability for breach of the warranty against eviction. This did not mean that the words at issue were superfluous; they referred also to express warranties which would have related to the condition of the car.

The court held further that there did not appear to be any clear authority for a general principle that exemption clauses should be construed differently from other provisions in a contract. That did not mean, however, that courts were not, or should not be, wary of contractual exclusions, since they deprived parties of rights that they would otherwise have had at common law. In the absence of legislation regulating unfair contract terms, and where a provision did not offend public policy or considerations of good faith, a careful construction of the contract itself should ensure the protection of the party whose rights had been limited, but also give effect to the principle that the other party should be able to protect herself or himself against liability insofar as it was legally permissible. The very fact, however, that an exclusion clause limited or ousted common-law rights should make a court consider with great care the meaning of the clause, especially if it was very general in its application. This required a consideration of the background circumstances and a resort to surrounding circumstances if there was any doubt as to the application of the exclusion.

The court also held (per Marais JA), that the words "no warranty whatsoever has been or is given to me by the seller or his agent(s)" were of the widest connotation, but of critical importance were the words "has been or is given to me by the seller or his agent(s)." Their ordinary meaning was that Van der Westhuizen (or his agent(s)) neither gave nor had given any guarantees or warranties whatsoever. They were certainly apt to have excluded all expressly-given warranties, whatever their content. Although the word "whatsoever" would have covered warranties both expressly and tacitly given, a warranty which arose ex lege and owed nothing to the consensus of the parties was another matter altogether. It was not a warranty which was given (either expressly or tacitly) by the seller or his agent(s). The chosen words were not apt to exclude such a warranty. Plainer language than that which appellant had chosen would have been necessary to exclude effectively such a warranty.

The decision in the Cape Provincial Division, in Arnold v Van der Westhuizen, was thus confirmed.
