= Magnolia Grove (Iron Station, North Carolina) =

Historic house in North Carolina, United States

- U.S. National Register of Historic Places
- Location within North Carolina Location within the United States
- Location: Jct. of SR 1309 and 1313, near Iron Station, North Carolina
- Coordinates: 35°25′3″N 81°10′26″W
- Area: 15.9 acres (6.4 ha)
- Built: c. 1824
- Architectural style: Quacker plan
- NRHP reference No.: 72000968, 97000570 (Boundary Increase)
- Added to NRHP: March 16, 1972, June 27, 1997 (Boundary Increase)

Magnolia Grove is a historic plantation house located near Iron Station, Lincoln County, North Carolina. It was built about 1824, and is a 2 1/2-story, five bay by two bay, brick dwelling with a Quaker plan interior. The building's brickwork is laid in Flemish bond. It has a gable roof, sits on a full raised basement, and one-story hip-roof porches on the front and rear facades.

It was listed on the National Register of Historic Places in 1972, with a boundary increase in 1997.
