= South Africa–Taiwan relations =

- Taiwan: South Africa

Diplomatic mission
- Taipei Liaison Office in the Republic of South Africa: Liaison Office of the Republic of South Africa

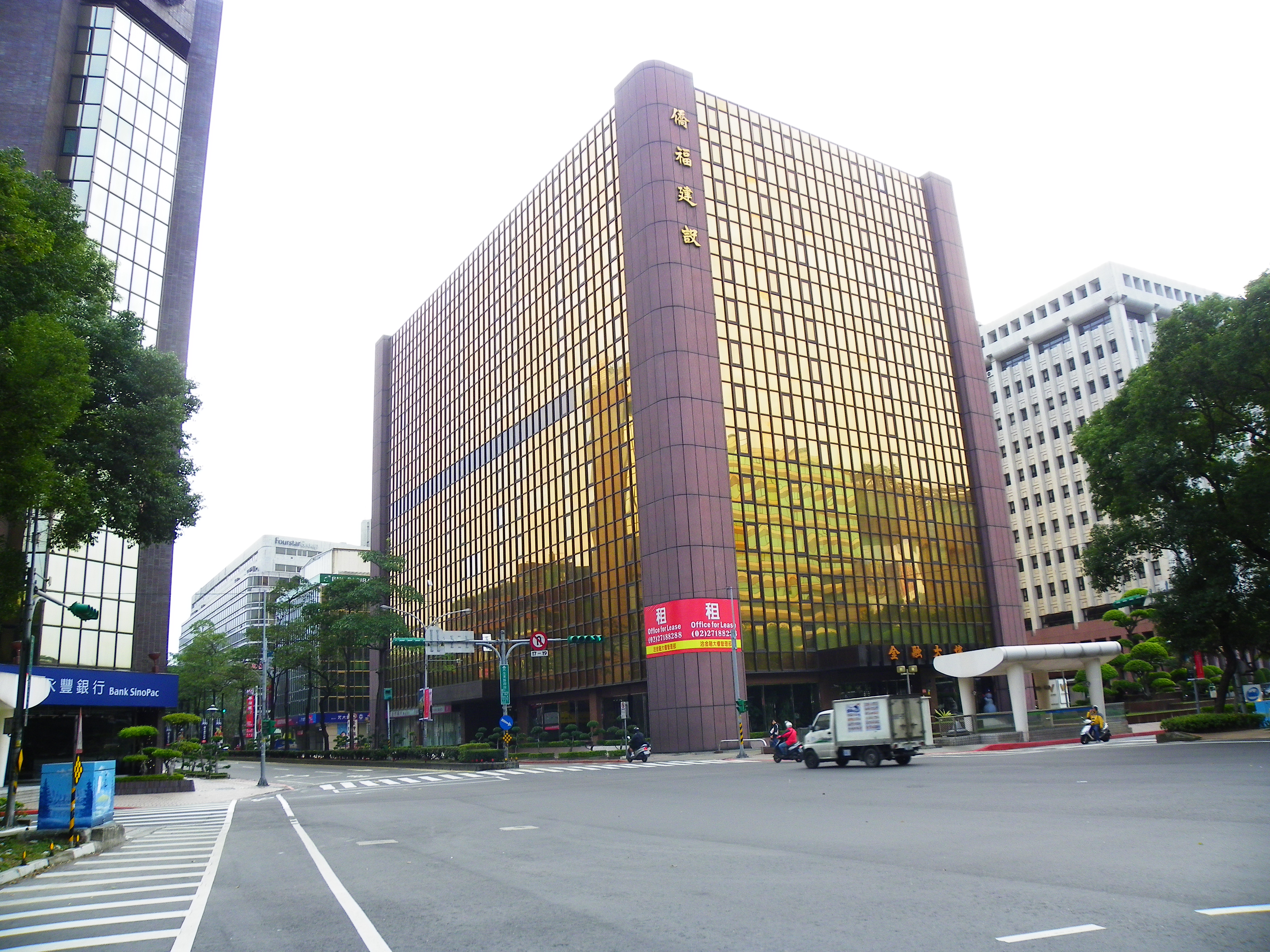
Chaofu Finance Building, where the Liaison Office of the Republic of South Africa is located, in Taipei, Taiwan.

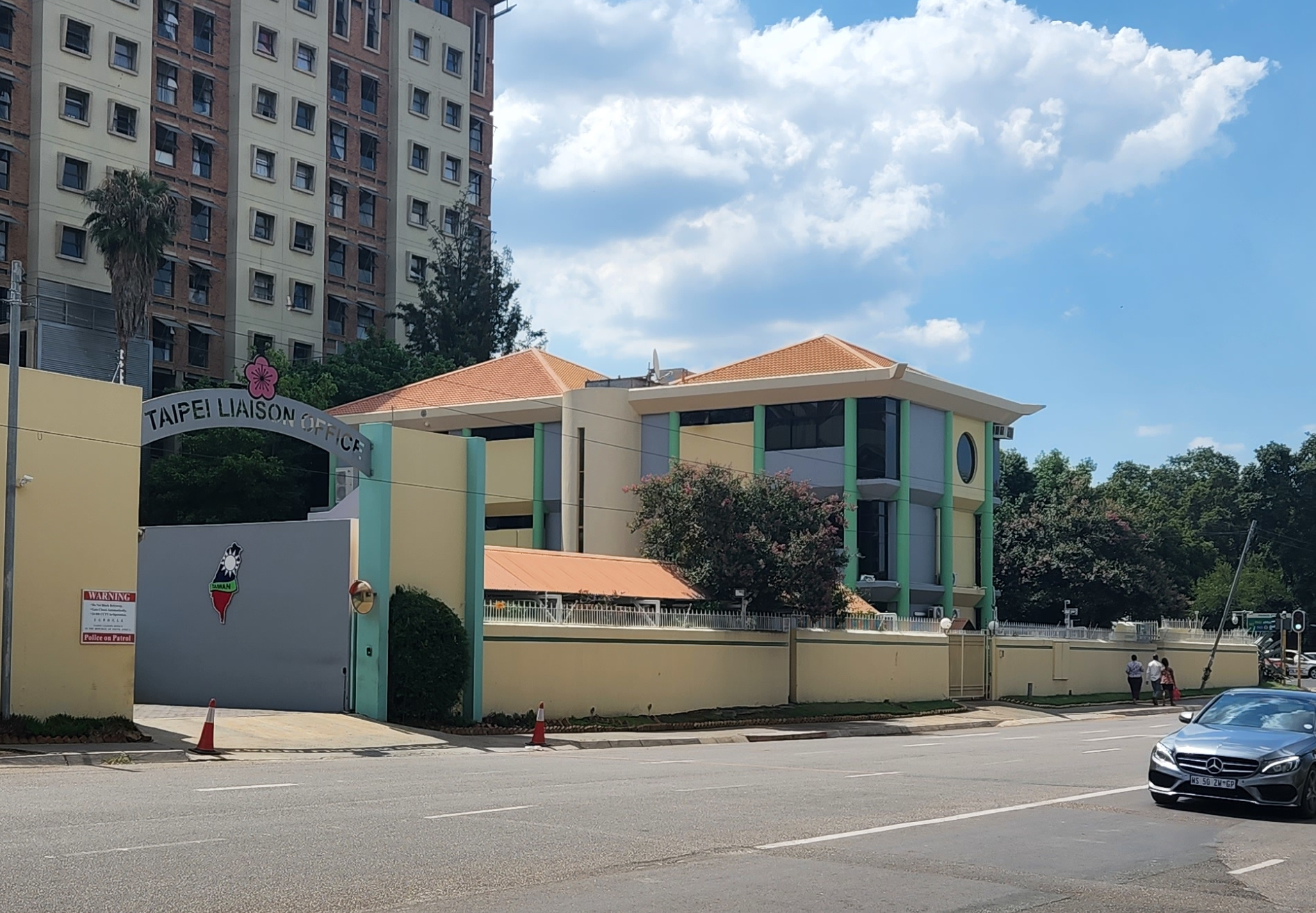
The Taipei Liaison Office in Pretoria, South Africa.

South Africa–Taiwan relations (before 1998, Republic of China–South Africa relations) refers to the current and historical relationship between the Republic of China (Taiwan) and the Republic of South Africa. The Republic of China and South Africa established diplomatic ties in 1949.

Relations between the two countries were strong during the apartheid-era in South Africa, but officially ended in January 1998, when South African President Nelson Mandela recognized the People's Republic of China, pursuant to the one China principle, and Taiwan as a part of China. Despite the ending of diplomatic relations, ROC and South Africa continue to maintain trade relations. South Africa was the last major power and G20 nation to have relations with the ROC.

In the absence of formal diplomatic relations, the two countries now have "Liaison Offices", which serve as de facto embassies. South Africa is now represented in Taipei by the Liaison Office of the Republic of South Africa. Similarly, Taiwan is represented by the Taipei Liaison Office in the Republic of South Africa in Pretoria. There is also a Taipei Liaison Office in Cape Town.

Diplomatic relations between South Africa and Taiwan have soured in recent years, with South Africa demanding that Taiwan relocate its Pretoria (administrative capital) Liaison Office to Johannesburg (not a capital city), and downgrade it to a simple trade office. In kind, Taiwan has placed semiconductor export restrictions on South Africa, citing national security concerns over South Africa's close allegiance with China.

== Chinese South Africans ==
Chinese South Africans are an ethnic group of Chinese diaspora in South Africa. They and their ancestors immigrated to South Africa beginning during the Dutch colonial era in the Cape Colony. Among the Chinese South Africans are Taiwanese businesspeople who settled in South Africa during the apartheid era.

== Republic of China relations with apartheid South Africa ==
=== Politics ===
Republic of China–South Africa relations
- Taiwan: South Africa

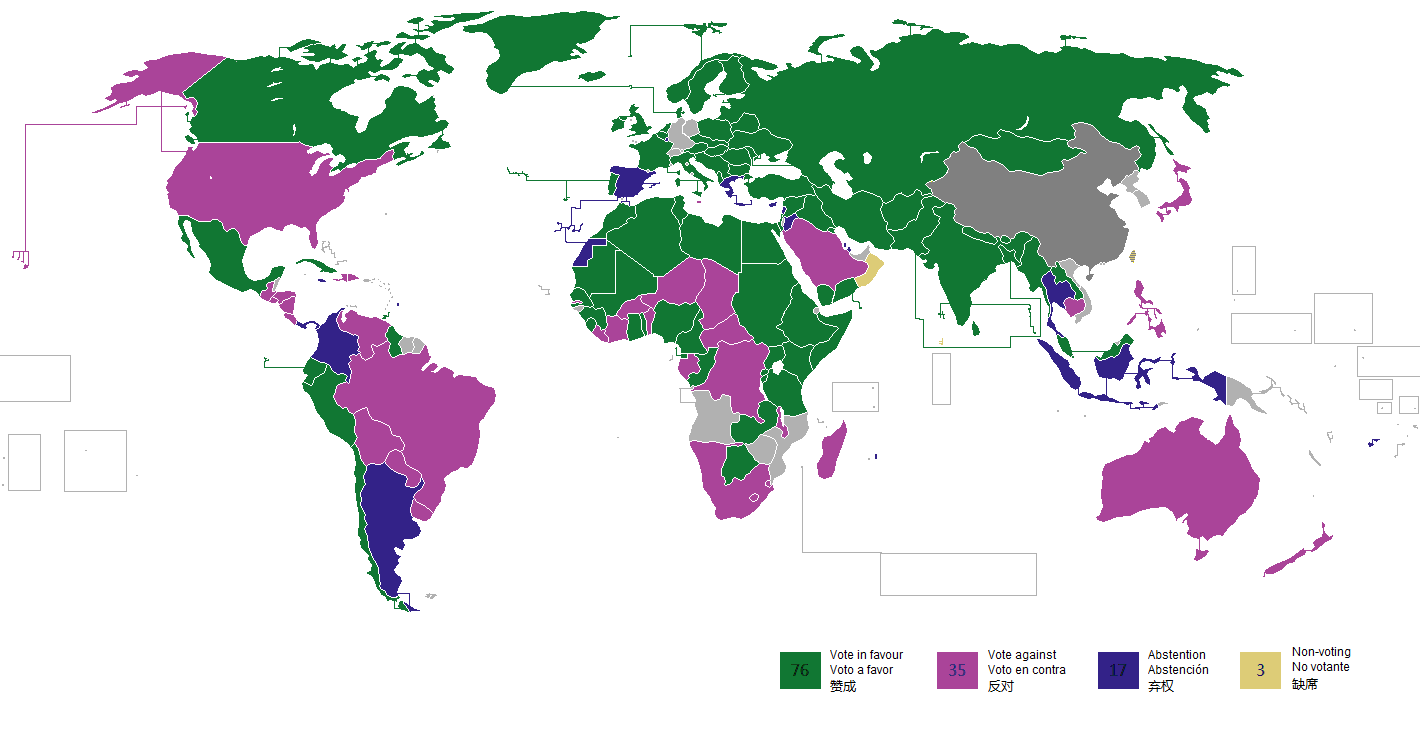
South Africa voted against the replacement of Taiwan with the PRC on the United Nations General Assembly Resolution 2758.

Relations were established in 1949 and grew considerably in 1971 after United Nations General Assembly Resolution 2758 withdrew international recognition of the Republic of China in favour of the People's Republic of China. South Africa had previously maintained cool relations with Taiwan due to fears that closer relations would increase mainland China's support for the Pan Africanist Congress of Azania, a liberation movement which already had ties to Communist China.

South Africa first established a Consulate in Taipei in 1967, which was upgraded to a Consulate General three years later. In 1976, both South Africa and Taiwan upgraded their consulates to full embassy status. Both shared a similar international worldview, with the Taiwanese ambassador to South Africa H. K. Yang noting, "South Africa and my country are joined in the fight against communism. We are in favour of free enterprise, democracy and freedom".

Relations expanded in the 1980s with South African leader P. W. Botha visiting in 1980 as Prime Minister. Earlier in 1980, former Taiwan Premier Sun Yun-suan visited South Africa. Vice President of Taiwan Hsieh Tung-min was present when the 1983 South African Constitution was inaugurated. Vice President Lee Teng-hui was a guest at Botha's presidential inauguration in 1984. Botha visited Taiwan again in 1986, this time as State President. Trade and political relations grew until the 1990s, when Nelson Mandela withdrew recognition of the ROC in favour of the PRC.

=== Military ===
Taiwan and South Africa cooperated significantly in the military arena, especially on weapons of mass destruction. In the beginning Taiwan bought 100 tons of uranium metal from South Africa which was delivered between 1973 and 1974. In 1980, the two countries signed an agreement for Taiwan to send South Africa a total of 4,000 tons of uranium over six years.

Taiwan, South Africa, and Israel shared nuclear technology during this period with Taiwan and Israel supplying money and technical expertise and the South Africans supplying fissile materials and discreet operating locations. In 1983 Taiwan and South Africa agreed to cooperate on laser enrichment, chemical enrichment, and building a small reactor. The South African reactor program was slowed down in 1985 due to budget cuts and cancelled completely half a decade later. The enrichment programs also likely ended around this time.

=== Economics ===
In 1970, total two-way trade between South Africa and Taiwan amounted to US$7 million, by 1972 total two-way trade amounted to US$57 million with the balance strongly in South Africa's favour. This initial increase was due to strong South African exports of maize to Taiwan in 1971.

In 1975, the two governments signed a trade agreement which expanded trade relations considerably. In 1985, 69% of Taiwanese imports from South Africa were either minerals or metals, while South Africa primarily imported textiles (27%) and machinery (22%). Taiwan, along with other newly industrialized Asian countries Hong Kong and South Korea, invested heavily in the internationally unrecognized bantustans of Transkei, Bophuthatswana, Ciskei and Venda.

Trade relations grew rapidly in the late 1980s; in 1986, trade volume totaled $546 million and a year later, it totaled $911 million, an increase of 67% in one year. As of 1989, 2,000 visas had been issued for South African and Taiwanese businesspeople to visit and conduct business in each other's countries. In 1987, Taiwan had $100 million invested in the South African economy.

In 1996, South Africa estimated that it received approximately $80 million a year in aid from Taiwan. This included scholarships for 15 South African students in Taiwan, a small business development project, a vocational training school and agricultural programs. South Africa also owed Taiwan approximately $50 million.

=== Culture ===
Taiwan and South Africa established several cultural exchanges in the 1980s; in 1984, South African General Johann Coetzee was awarded the Yun Hai medal of Taiwan for promoting the "traditional friendship and military cooperation" between the two countries. In 1987, an exchange program was established between the Cape Town Symphony Orchestra and the Taipei Arts Festival.

=== Academia ===
From 1980 to 1988 there was an intense desire to establish Academic exchanges in both countries, to this end the Minister of Education of the RSA, P.J. Clase, visited the ROC in July 1980, and the then Director-General of the Department of National Education of the RSA, J.J. van Wyk, visited the ROC in November 1980. From 1980 onward several leading South African Academics and Taiwanese academics went on several exchanges. Some of the leading academics included Jacob van der Westhuizen, Director of the Institute for Criminology of UNISA, in December 1987.

== Post-apartheid relations and derecognition ==
=== Politics ===
The fall of the apartheid regime and the resulting democratic elections of 1994 changed Taiwan's relations with South Africa considerably. The Taiwanese government was aware that the new ANC lead government was unlikely to look favourably on the Taiwanese government, given its support for apartheid South Africa during the years before 1994.

In an attempt to improve relations with the new government, Taipei embarked on a public relations campaign. Spending millions of dollars on flying out government officials, parliamentarians and representatives from South Africa's political parties to show them around the island, it even went as far as making donations to the ANC's election campaign in 1994, first donating US$10 million followed by another US$5 million.

Despite having some initial success the South African government was concerned how its relationship with Taiwan would affect its trade and diplomatic operations in the region after the handover of Hong Kong in 1997 to the People's Republic of China. As Hong Kong had been under British administration, South Africa was able to maintain a consulate by virtue of its diplomatic relations with the United Kingdom.

South Africa feared that after the handover Beijing might force the closure of its consulate and the country would no longer be allowed to use the city as a transit route for air traffic and trade with the rest of the region. In addition, the leadership of the South African Communist Party, many of whom held important positions in the new government, were strongly in support of shifting recognition to Beijing.

In December 1996, South Africa announced it would end relations with Taiwan in favour of the People's Republic of China in January 1998; a visit by Foreign Minister John Chiang to meet with Alfred Baphethuxolo Nzo and attempt to salvage the situation produced no results, and so in response, Taiwan immediately canceled all aid programs and recalled its ambassador to South Africa, Gene Loh.

Under a transitional arrangement, South Africa was able to maintain its consulate in Hong Kong for an interim six-month period, until relations with Beijing were finally established on January 1, 1998, while existing air services were temporarily retained.

In November 1997, South African military attache McGill Alexander was taken hostage along with his family in their Taipei home by a fugitive murderer; Alexander and his daughter were accidentally shot, but the situation was resolved without loss of life.

In April 2024, the South African government ordered Taiwan to relocate its representative office from capital city Pretoria to Johannesburg and rebrand it as a trade office within six months, allegedly due to pressure from China. The South African government also stated that the relocation was not up for negotiation and the office would be closed if Taiwan did not comply.

In response to the South African government's moves, Ministry of Foreign Affairs of China spokesperson Mao Ning commended South Africa stating that "the one-China principle is the political foundation for China to establish and develop diplomatic relations with countries around the world." The Ministry of Foreign Affairs of Taiwan urged South Africa to resist pressure and withdraw its request, warning that the ministry may come up with reciprocal countermeasures, such as requesting the relocation of the Liaison Office of the Republic of South Africa in Taipei, stricter visa rules for South Africans to visit Taiwan, and the suspension of educational exchanges.

At a meeting of the Legislative Yuan's Foreign Affairs and National Defense Committee on 22 October 2024, Minister of Foreign Affairs of Taiwan Lin Chia-lung stated that Taiwan will not relocate its office from Pretoria and that South African government's actions would violate the agreement it signed with Taiwan in 1997 to maintain unofficial diplomatic relations following South Africa's establishment of relations with China in 1996.

=== Trade ===
Despite the derecognition of Taiwan, the two countries maintained trade relations; As of 2010, the Bank of Taiwan still maintained a branch in South Africa and in 2010 Taiwan ranked as South Africa's 16th largest importer, with goods totaling over 5.9 million rand ($861,000). As of 2019, "South Africa is Taiwan’s largest trade partner in Africa".

In September 2025, Taiwan placed restrictions on South Africa's imports of semiconductors - an industry over which the former has strong control. The restrictions were imposed due to national security concerns, with Taiwan viewing South Africa as closely allied with China. The trade limitations came as a response to pressures from the South African government on Taiwan to move its Liaison Office out of the administrative capital of Pretoria, and downgrade it to a trade office.
