= Haplogroup R-L21 =

Paternal haplogroup of Celtic origin

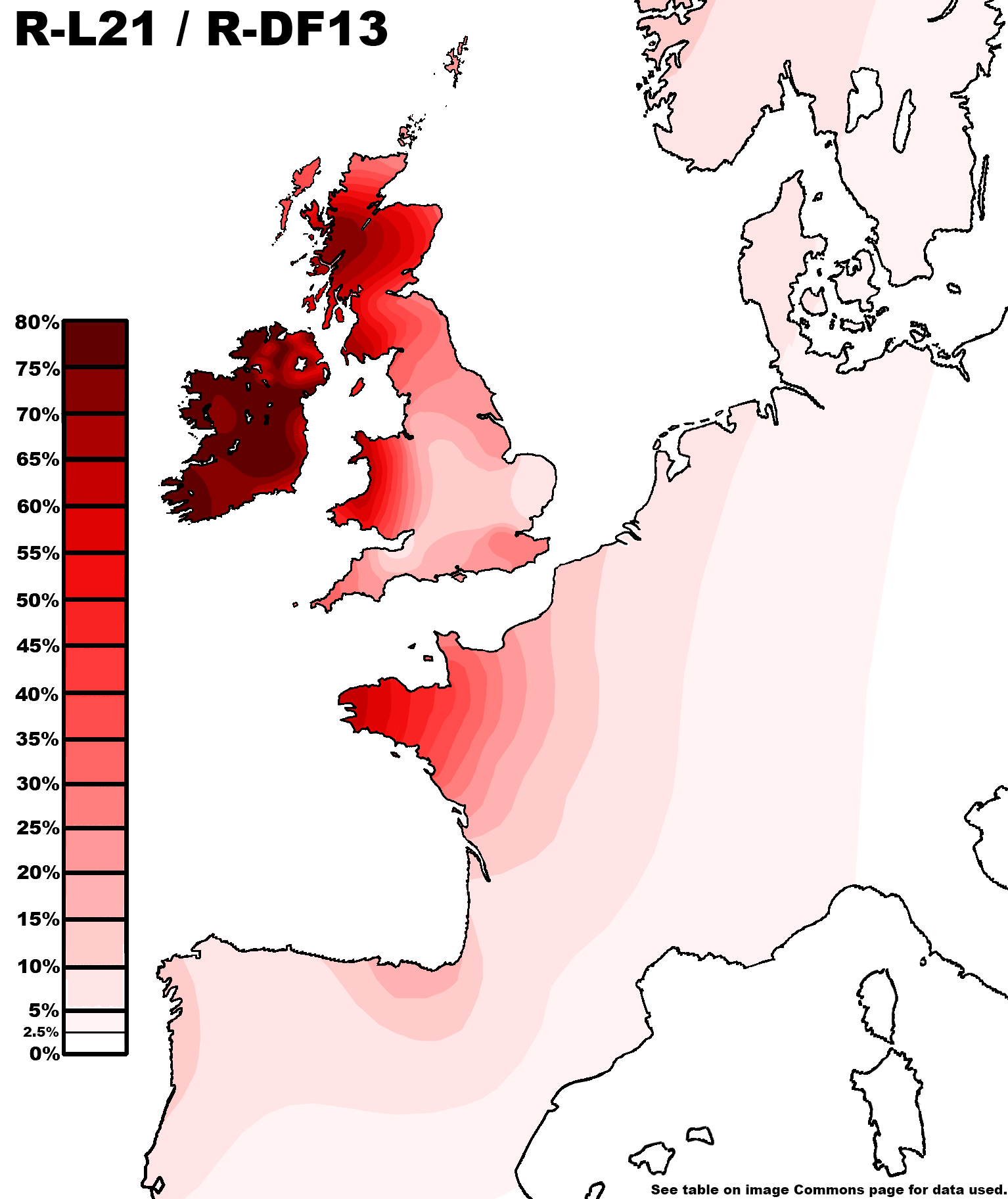
- Distribution of major subclade R-DF13 across western Europe
- Possible time of origin: 2,600 BC
- Possible place of origin: Southwest Britain
- Ancestor: R-L151: P312; Z290; R-L21
- Descendants: R-DF13, R-DF63, R-A5846, R-A7905
- Defining mutations: L21/M529/S145
- Highest frequencies: Irish; Scottish; Welsh; Bretons; English; Basques; Galicians

Haplogroup R-L21 (R1b1a1b1a1a2c1) is a Human Y-chromosome DNA haplogroup. It is often linked to the Insular Celts. One subclade, R-DF13 (R1b1a1b1a1a2c1a), comprises over 99% of bearers. It is most frequently found among males in Ireland, but is also dominant in Scotland, Wales and Brittany, present in high frequencies in England and western France and present also to a lesser extent in Iberia, Scandinavia and the Low Countries.

== History ==
This haplogroup first emerges in the Early Bronze Age in Britain and Ireland, where the earliest samples begin to appear. Its introduction was part of a large genetic transformation associated with the Bell Beaker culture, wherein steppe descended peoples largely replaced Britain's earlier Neolithic population. The lineage reached a frequency of 90% in early Bronze Age Britain (being nearly absent in contemporary samples from the continent), it gradually declined through the Middle Bronze Age to 70% by the Iron Age (due to continental migrations which also increased the levels of EEF admixture among Britons). (Note: See Large-scale migration into Britain during the Middle to Late Bronze Age Figure 5) It later fell to its modern levels in Britain after the Anglo-Saxon invasions. However, it still remains the dominant lineage in Ireland, Scotland, Brittany and Wales.

== Archaeological testing ==
- The body of a man excavated from Canada Farm, Sixpenny Handley, Dorset dating from 2468 to 2294 BC was found to be R-L21. (Note: Sample ID: I5379, See Supplementary Tables, Large-scale migration into Britain during the Middle to Late Bronze Age)
- The body of a man (Note: Sample ID: KD070) found in Low Hauxley, Northumberland, dating from 2464 to 2209 BC, was classified as R1b1a1b1a1a2c1a1n (R-DF13 > R-Z39589 > R-FGC59881 > R-BY577 > R-BY575).
- 'Racton Man' found in Westbourne, West Sussex, England, dating from 2453 to 2146 BC and buried with a bronze dagger was classified as R-L21. (Note: Sample ID: I27380, See Supplementary Tables, Large-scale migration into Britain during the Middle to Late Bronze Age)
- The Companion (Note: Sample ID: I2565) (dating to 2456‒2146 BC, aged 25–30), buried beside the Amesbury Archer (Note: Sample ID: I14200) (dating to 2470‒2239 BC, aged 35–45), found near Stonehenge, belonged to R-L21. The archer (identified only as R-L151) may have been buried up to 80 years before the companion (although there is overlap in the dates) and was a kinsman (both shared a calcaneonavicular coalition on their feet), with a predicted relatedness coefficient of 0.0405 (95% confidence interval of -0.0161 to 0.0971). The isotopic profiles of the men indicate the archer spent the earliest years of his life in the Alps, near modern Switzerland, and had higher levels of Neolithic ancestry compared to the companion who had spent his life in Britain but may have spent his early teens in North East Scotland or the Midlands. The archer possessed above average EEF admixture of 45% whereas the companion had around 33%, more in line with other British samples of the Early Bronze Age. Another man, (Note: Sample ID: I2417) also buried in Amesbury Down and dating from 2500 to 2100 BC was also R-L21 (Note: See Supplementary Tables, Large-scale migration into Britain during the Middle to Late Bronze Age) and is notable of having an EEF admixture of only 22%, the lowest ever found in Britain.
- A body of a man dating from around 2349-2135 BC found in Pollnagollum, (Note: Study ID: Pollnagollum911) Ireland was classified as R-DF13 > R-FGC11134, a predominantly Irish subclade in modern populations and ancestral to the Eóganachta. Another body found in Treanmacmurtagh, (Note: Study ID: Treanmacmurtagh116) County Sligo, Ireland, dating from 2015 to 1758 BC was also classified as R-FGC11134.
- 'Ditchling Man', dating from 2287 to 2041 BC, found in Ditchling Road, Sussex and buried with a pottery beaker, arrowhead & shells. He was classified as R-Z290, the immediate parent of R-L21. (Note: Sample ID: I6774, See Supplementary Tables, Large-scale migration into Britain during the Middle to Late Bronze Age)
- Three Early Bronze Age men from burials on Rathlin Island off the north coast of Ireland were all R1b1a2a1a2c, or R-L21. Rathlin 1 dated from 2026 to 1885 BC and was defined as R-DF21. Rathlin 2 dated from 2024 to 1741 BC and was defined as further defined as R-DF13. Rathlin 3 dated from 1736 to 1534 BC and was defined as R-L21.

== Prominent members of R-L21 ==
Below are listed some theorized lineages of prominent families.

- The House of Stuart who ruled as Kings of Scotland from 1371 and then, additionally, as Kings of England and Ireland from 1603 until 1714. According to the Stewart DNA Project they lie under the subclade R1b-L21 > DF13 > Z39589 > DF41/S524 > Z43690 > S775 > L746 > S781. They are ultimately of Breton origin.
- The Dál gCais clan and all subsidiary families including the O'Brien (who were High Kings of Ireland, Kings of Munster, Kings of Thomond, Earl of Thomond, Viscount Clare, Marquess of Thomond etc.) as well as the MacNamara Lords of Clancullen, the O'Kennedy Lords of Ormond, the O'Dea Lords of Cineal Fearmaic and others. They descended from the common ancestor of Tál Cas and are of the lineage: L21>>DF13>ZZ10_1>>Z2534>>>L226>>Z17669. (Note: See High Resolution Paternal Genetic History of Ireland... page 105)
- The Eoganacht and their close relatives, the Uí Fidgenti, whom they have a corresponding genetic and genealogical relationship to (via their shared descent from Ailill Flann Bec). They possessed the mutation L21>>DF13>FGC11134>>>>>CTS4466>>>>A541. They were Kings of Munster from around 400 AD until they were deposed by their former vassals, the Dál gCais in the 10th century. Septs include the O'Sullivan Lords of Beare, the O'Mahony Lords of Kinalmeaky and others. The descendants of Cellachán Caisil, their last great king in Munster before this deposition have however shown to belong to an entirely separate lineage. His descendants included the O'Callaghans (Lords of Cineál Aodha) and Mac Carthys (Kings of Desmond, Earl of Clancarty etc.). These belonged to the lineage L21>>DF13>DF21>>>>>Z16534.
- The Connachta, specifically the descendants of the sons of Eochaid Mugmedon, comprising the Uí Briúin, Uí Fiachrach and Uí Néill who ruled as High Kings of Ireland, Kings of Connacht, Kings of Ulster and Kings of Mide. They were of the lineage L21>>DF13>Z39589>>>>>>>>M222>>>>DF105. Lineages beneath DF105 (which likely represent Eochaidh's descendants) now represents around 20% of Irish male lines. Examples of septs include the O'Donnell (Kings of Tír Conaill, Earl of Tyrconnell), the O'Connor Kings of Connacht and the Mac Lochlainn Kings of Tír Eoghan. However the later "O'Neill dynasty" (who usurped the aforementioned Mac Lochlainns from the kingship of Tír Chonaill), who descended from Áed in Macáem Tóinlesc, belonged to an entirely separate lineage R-Z1513, ultimately descending from R-DF27 and not even L21 at all. This family comprises the Clannaboy O’Neills, Tyrone O’Neills, O’Neills of the Fews, and the McShanes.
- Louis Riel (1844-1885), who descends from the subclade L21>>DF13>ZZ10_1>>Z2534>>>L226>>>>>>> DC21, being a descendent of the Dalcassian clan. This was demonstrated through a relative who can be found in the R-L226 project who descends from Louis' ancestor, Jean-Baptiste Riel (1731 - 1788). The Riel family ultimately traced its origins from a Jacobite soldier, Jean Baptiste Riel (abt. 1663 - 1753), who left Limerick, Ireland for France in 1696. The name may have been a transmutation of the Irish name O'Reilly.
- Che Guevara (1928-1967), the Argentine Marxist revolutionary and major figure of the Cuban Revolution, forensic identification of his skeletal remains revealed that he belonged to haplogroup R1b-L21.
