= Tucker's Grove Camp Meeting Ground =

- U.S. National Register of Historic Places
- Location within North Carolina Location within the United States
- Location: N of Iron Station off SR 1360, near Iron Station, North Carolina
- Coordinates: 35°28′3″N 81°5′0″W
- Area: 5 acres (2.0 ha)
- Built: 1800
- Architectural style: regional vernacular
- NRHP reference No.: 72000972
- Added to NRHP: October 18, 1972

Tucker's Grove Camp Meeting Ground is a historic African Methodist Episcopal Zion Church camp meeting ground located near Iron Station, Lincoln County, North Carolina. Tucker's Grove Camp Meeting begins the 3rd Saturday of August, and continues until the 4th Sunday, also called 'Big Sunday'. Throughout the week of Camp Meeting, hundreds of camp participants move to the grounds to attend worship services and fellowship with family and friends.

African American families in the Lincoln County area have come together for spiritual renewal and fellowship at camp meeting since after slavery ended. Mary Tucker, wife of a local landowner, gave the land for Tucker's Grove. Five United Methodist churches (Tucker's Grove, Brevard, Ebenezer, Rock Hill and St. James) and Gold Hill Baptist Church, sponsor the campground. The camp meeting has been operating continuously since 1874.

It was listed on the National Register of Historic Places in 1972.

The Arbor

The arbor, located in the center of the grounds, is a heavily timbered structure covered with a large tin roof. The trustees and others built the arbor using a grove and peg method. There were no spikes or nails used. Over the years, metal supports were added to strengthen the arbor. The original floor was dirt, then later saw dust or sand was used. It has a raised platform with a pulpit and in front of the platform a long wooden bench known as the mourners' bench, "seeker's bench" or "anxious seat."

It was renovated in 2017 with grant funding from the Duke Endowment. The height of the entries to the arbor was raised, some of the wooden beams were replaced with like-aged beams, and the tin on the roof was repaired or replaced.

The Tents

The arbor is surrounded by rows of 98 wooden frame 'tents' which form an almost continuous enclosure, roughly square in form. Each tent has a dining room, kitchen and one or more bedrooms.

During the early days, people would walk to the campground, or arrive by horse and buggy and bring all of the essentials needed to camp out on the grounds. The camp participants would bring live chickens, and the 'Ice Man' would bring blocks of ice for people to buy in order to keep their food from spoiling.

In recent years, some tent owners have added a second level with additional bedrooms, As the wood deteriorates, camp participants repair their tents with new or used wood. Most repairs take place prior to the opening of camp meeting. Many camp members who have moved to other areas plan their vacation so they can travel home to camp meeting.

Concessions

Upon entering the camp ground on the side facing the church, concession stand vendors sell a variety of food, clothes, jewelry, and misc items. The photography stand has been a permanent fixture on the grounds since 1958.

The Monument

In 2002, A slab of granite was donated and erected outside the arbor. It bears the inscription 'Tucker's Grove Campground, 1874' and has an engraving of a cross on the opposite side. This monument stands as a visual reminder of the rick, longstanding tradition of camp meeting at Tucker's Grove. The monument is surrounded by a colorful flower garden that is maintained by the Gregory Family.

The Blessing of the Grounds

An annual tradition at Tucker's is the blessing of the grounds. Since 2012, the host pastor has led a procession of Board of Trustee members and Camp Meeting participants around the grounds as he sprinkles Holy Water and old gospel hymns are sung. The blessing of the grounds occurs on the Friday evening before the official start of Camp Meeting.

Board of Trustees

There is a Board of Trustees that ensures that the historical structures remain intact by overseeing the operations of the grounds throughout the year. The Trustees work hard to ensure that the grounds continue to be well kept and acknowledged as the treasure that it is. The original trustees were: Wesley Abernathy, Henry Brevard, Milton Monday, and Alexander McLean.

The Host Pastor

Reverend Albert Perkins was the Pastor of Tucker's Grove United Methodist Church and host pastor of the camp ground for more than 33 years before his retirement in 2018. Dr. Marvin Caldwell has succeeded him as Host Pastor and Pastor of the church.
