= Van der Westhuizen =

van der Westhuizen Family

van der Westhuizen (also known as van der Westhuisen, van der Westhysen) is a common Afrikaans surname of Dutch/Flemish origin. The largest number of van der Westhuizens can be found in Africa, but because of immigration large numbers of van der Westhuizens can also be found in Argentina, Australia, United Kingdom, Canada, New Zealand and the United States. Van der Westhuizens have had a notable presence in South African history, most notably the Great Trek, First Boer War and the Second Boer War, as well as strategic campaigns in both World Wars.

== Family history ==
The origins of the family name began with Pieter Jansz van der Westhuizen, a native of Bruges, Flanders. The first record of Pieter Jansz's arrival in Cape Town is in 1662 as a soldier for the Dutch East India Company, where he changed his name to van der Westhuizen from Westhuysen. Later Pieter Jansz worked as a servant for Tieleman Hendricks till the late 1660s. Pieter became a Free Citizen ('Vryburger' in Afrikaans) in 1670 along with Hendrik Coester, and in 1673 he married Maria Hendrickz Winkelhuisen, the German widow of Hendrik Barentsz, adopting her three children. Together they had seven children (Maria, Johannes, Claas, Barent, Hendrik, Helena, and Pieter). In 1706 Pieter married Eva Gerritsz Ligthart (widow of Jan Douwensz Mos) from Amsterdam, after the death of Maria earlier that year.

== Family tributes ==
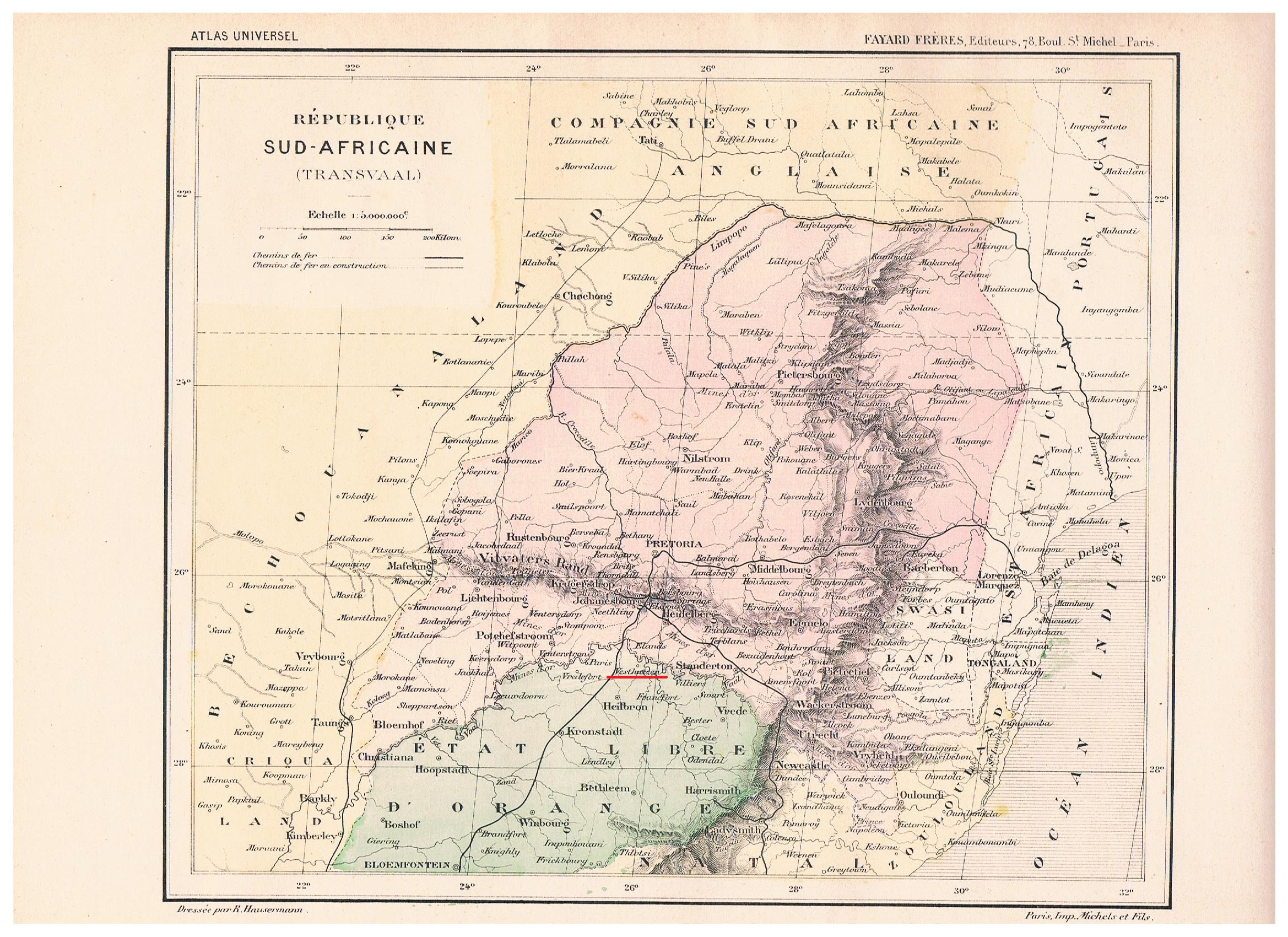
Old French map of the Transvaal in 1896. Note that above the Free State town of Heilbron is another settlement indicated as Westhuizen, also note that 'w' is replaced with 'v' in names such as "Vitvaters Rand". It is thus possible that at one point in time a town or area was named "Westhuizen".

The van der Westhuizen street in the Cape is named after the van der Westhuizen family (Other significant street names also exist in the Northern Cape, Western Cape, Gauteng ('Transvaal'), Chatham in the United Kingdom and in Alberta Canada).

- Van Der Westhuizen Street, Carletonville, Gauteng.
- Van Der Westhuizen Street, Heidelberg, Gauteng.
- Van Der Westhuizen Street, Oudtshoorn, Western Cape.
- Van Der Westhuizen Street, East Lynne, Pretoria, Gauteng.

== Notable family members ==
- Joost van der Westhuizen (1971–2017), South African rugby union Rugby player, Springbok
- Johann van der Westhuizen, judge in the Constitutional Court of South Africa
- Jacob van der Westhuizen, director of the Institute for Criminology of UNISA
- Louis van der Westhuizen, a Namibian cricketer
- Charlize van der Westhuizen, a South African cricketer
- Marco van der Westhuizen, former rugby player and pastor
- Yolandi van der Westhuizen, an international cricketer
- Minki van der Westhuizen, well-known model
- Peter van der Westhuizen, former South African runner
- Joffel van der Westhuizen, former Lieutenant General of the South African army.
- Petrus Johannes Van Der Westhuizen. Politics. National Leader, African Christian Alliance - Afrikaner Christen Alliansie (ACA-Party)

== Alternate spellings ==
=== Van der Westhuyzen ===
- Jaco van der Westhuyzen, rugby player
- Jean van der Westhuyzen, South African-Australian sprint canoeist
- Pierre van der Westhuyzen, South African-Australian sprint canoeist

=== Van der Westhuysen ===
- Hannah van der Westhuysen, English actress.
