= Jacob van der Westhuizen =

Criminology academic

- Scientific career
- Fields: Criminology
- Workplaces: Director of the Institute for Criminology; University of South Africa

Professor Jacob van der Westhuizen was a noted South African academic in the field of Criminology, who published over twenty-five books.

== Career ==
In December 1987, van der Westhuizen participated in an academic exchange programme in the Republic of China (Taiwan) in his capacity as Director of the Institute for Criminology at the University of South Africa.

== Works ==
Jacob van der Westhuizen produced 29 works in 64 publications in 2 languages.

- Criminology: an introduction, by PJ van der Walt, G Cronje, B F Smit and J van der Westhuizen
- 1988 "Wheels of misfortune: alcohol and drug abuse"
- 1996 "Forensic criminalistics"
- 1990 "Security management"
- 1983 "Portents of violence?" (with Hennie Oosthuizen)
- 1982 "An introduction to criminological research"

== See also ==
- South Africa–Taiwan relations
