= Iron Station, North Carolina =

- Census-designated place
- Location within North Carolina Location within the United States
- Country: United States
- State: North Carolina
- County: Lincoln

Area
  - Total: 2.37 sq mi (6.13 km^{2})
  - Land: 2.36 sq mi (6.12 km^{2})
  - Water: 0.0039 sq mi (0.01 km^{2})
- Elevation: 896 ft (273 m)

Population (2020)
  - Total: 825
  - Density: 349.3/sq mi (134.87/km^{2})
- Time zone: UTC-5 (Eastern (EST))
  - Summer (DST): UTC-4 (EDT)
- ZIP code: 28080
- Area code: 704
- FIPS code: 37-33820
- GNIS feature ID: 2628638

Iron Station is an unincorporated community and census-designated place (CDP) in Lincoln County, North Carolina, United States. A primarily industrial town, Iron Station had a population of 825 as of the 2020 census. It also serves as a bedroom community for the larger cities of Charlotte, Hickory, and Lincolnton.

== History ==
Ingleside, Magnolia Grove, and Tucker's Grove Camp Meeting Ground are listed on the National Register of Historic Places.

Iron Station was named for its history as an iron mining town with a train station.

== Geography ==
The community is southeast of the center of Lincoln County, along North Carolina Highway 27, which leads northwest 7 miles (11 km) to Lincolnton, the county seat, and southeast 25 miles (40 km) to Charlotte.

According to the U.S. Census Bureau, the Iron Station CDP has a total area of 2.4 square miles (6.1 km^{2}), of which 3.4 acres (13,938 m^{2}), or 0.23%, are water. The community is in the Piedmont region of North Carolina, and the town center is on a ridge which drains northeast to Dellinger Branch, which forms the northeastern border of the CDP, and southwest to Hoyle Creek. The entire community is part of the Catawba River watershed.

== Demographics ==
Historical population
Census	Pop.	Note	%±
2020	825		—
U.S. Decennial Census

== Education ==
- Iron Station Elementary School
- East Lincoln Middle School
- East Lincoln High School in Denver
