= Haplogroup R-L151 =

Human Y-chromosome DNA haplogroup

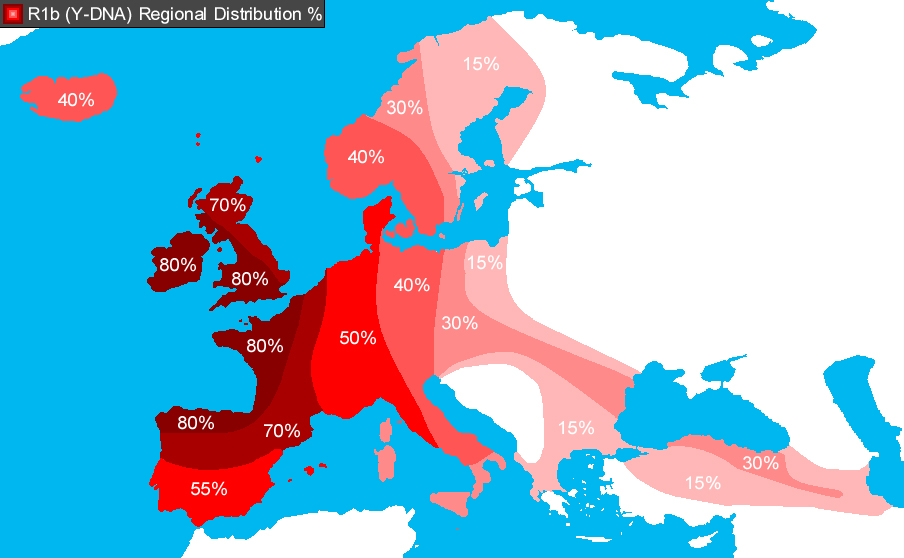
- Possible time of origin: 5,000 years
- Possible place of origin: Central Europe
- Ancestor: R1b (R-M343); R-M269
- Descendants: R-U106; R-P312; R-S1194; R-A8053
- Defining mutations: L11/PF6539/S127
- Highest frequencies: Irish; British; French; Spanish; Portuguese; German

R-L151, also known as R-L11 and R1b1a1b1a1a, is a human Y-chromosome DNA haplogroup; a subclade of the broader haplogroup R1b (R-M343). It is most often found in males from Western Europe – especially Western France, Northern Spain, Northern Portugal, Great Britain, and Ireland.

== Origin ==
This haplogroup is related to the period of Corded Ware or Beaker culture, and possibly founded 3,000 years before our era in the Central part of Europe (possible Bohemia region).

R-L151 is the most populous branch of R-M269, and is found in abundance along the Atlantic coasts of western Europe, especially Aquitaine, Asturias, Basques, Belgium, Brittany, Galicia, England, Ireland (as a whole), the Loire region, the isle of Man, Northern Portugal, Northern Spain, Scotland, and Wales. It is also found at significant levels in Switzerland and Northern Italy. R-L151 is found at lower frequencies in Poland and Ukraine, as well as many other European countries. Since the early modern era, males emigrating from Europe have introduced significant levels of R-L151 to The Americas and Australasia.

This human haplogroup has three primary subclades, the south-western branch, P312/S116, the north-eastern branch, R1b-S21-U106, the North Sea and Rhine basin branch R-S1194, and R-A8053.

Haplogroup R-L151 is geographicaly associated with peoples speaking Italo-Celtic or Germanic Indo-European languages, distinct from haplogroup R-Z2103 (a hypothesis based purely on the geographical distribution of its haplogroups and excluding non-Indo-European languages such as Etruscan). Haplogroup R-M269 combines these two groups (with other).

This human haplogroup includes, in particular, the "Italo-Celtic" branch, P312/S116, and the "Germanic" branch, R1b-S21-U106.
