= Insular Celts =

Speakers of the Insular Celtic languages in the British Isles and Brittany

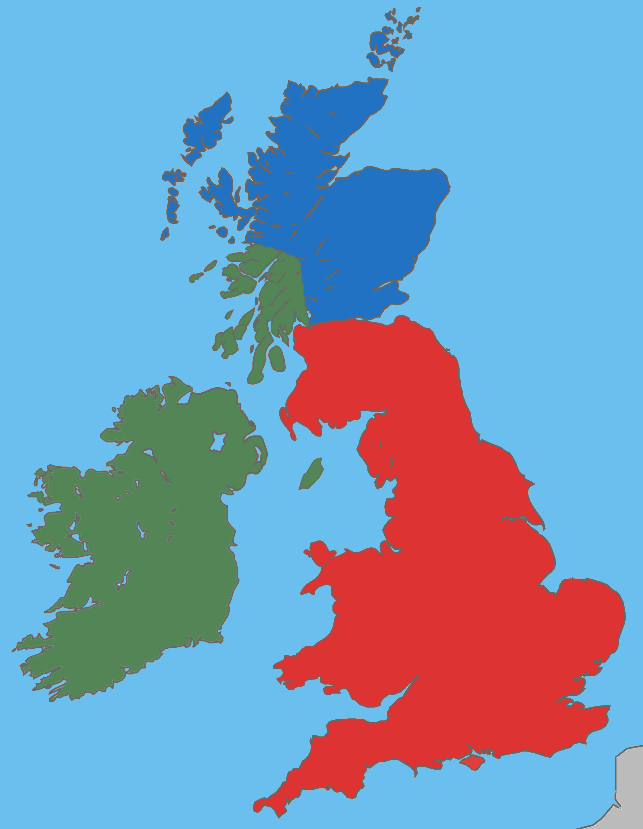
Britain & Ireland in the early–mid 1st millennium, before the founding of Anglo-Saxon kingdoms Celtic Britons Picts Gaels

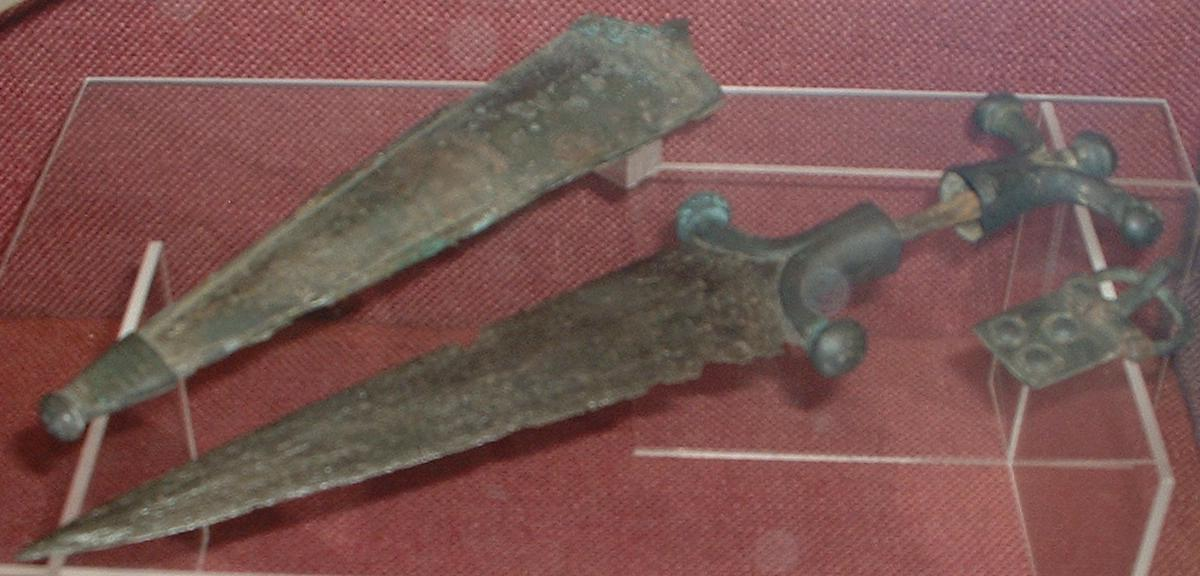
Celtic dagger found in Britain.

The Insular Celts were speakers of the Insular Celtic languages in the British Isles and Brittany. The term is mostly used for the Celtic peoples of the isles up until the early Middle Ages, covering the British–Irish Iron Age, Roman Britain and Sub-Roman Britain. They included the Celtic Britons, the Picts, and the Gaels.

The Insular Celtic languages spread throughout the islands during the Bronze Age or early Iron Age. They are made up of two major groups: Brittonic in the east and Goidelic in the west. While there are records of Continental Celtic languages from the sixth century BC, allowing a confident reconstruction of Proto-Celtic, Insular Celtic languages became attested only during the early first millennium AD. The Insular Celts followed an Ancient Celtic religion overseen by druids. Some of the southern British tribes had strong links with mainland Europe, especially Gaul and Belgica, and minted their own coins.

The Roman Empire conquered most of Britain in the 1st century AD, and a Romano-British culture emerged in the southeast. The Britons and Picts in the north, and the Gaels of Ireland, remained outside the empire. During the end of Roman rule in Britain in the 400s, there was significant Anglo-Saxon settlement of eastern and southern Britain, and some Gaelic settlement of its western coast. During this time, some Britons migrated to the Armorican peninsula, where their culture became dominant. Meanwhile, much of northern Britain (Scotland) became Gaelic.

By the 10th century, the Insular Celts had diversified into the Brittonic-speaking Welsh (in Wales), Cornish (in Cornwall), Bretons (in Brittany) and Cumbrians (in the Old North); and the Goidelic-speaking Irish (in Ireland), Scots (in Scotland) and Manx (on the Isle of Man). In southern Scotland and northern England, and the remnants of the Pictish people in northern Scotland.

== Origins ==
=== Archaeology ===
In older theories, the arrival of Celts, defined as speakers of Celtic languages, which derive from a Proto-Celtic language, roughly coincided with the beginning of the European Iron Age. In 1946, the Celtic scholar T. F. O'Rahilly published his influential model of the early history of Ireland, which postulated four separate waves of Celtic invaders, spanning most of the Iron Age (700 to 100 BCE). However, the archaeological evidence for these waves of invaders proved elusive. Later research indicated that the culture may have developed gradually and continuously between the Celts and the indigenous populations. Similarly in Ireland, little archaeological evidence was found for large intrusive groups of Celtic immigrants, suggesting to archaeologists, such as Colin Renfrew, that the native late Bronze Age inhabitants gradually absorbed European Celtic influences and language.

In the 1970s, a "continuity model" was popularized by Colin Burgess in his book The Age of Stonehenge, which theorised that Celtic culture in Great Britain "emerged" rather than resulted from invasion, and that the Celts were not invading aliens, but the descendants of, or culturally influenced by, figures such as the Amesbury Archer, whose burial included clear continental connections.

The archaeological evidence is of substantial cultural continuity through the 1st millennium BCE, although with a significant overlay of selectively adopted elements of the "Celtic" La Tène culture from the 4th century BCE onwards. There are claims of continental-style states appearing in southern England close to the end of the period, possibly reflecting in part immigration by élites from various Gallic states, such as those of the Belgae. Evidence of chariot burials in England begins about 300 BC and is mostly confined to the Arras culture associated with the Parisii.

=== Linguistics ===
It is thought that by about the 6th century BCE most of the inhabitants of the isles of Ireland and Britain were speaking Celtic languages. A controversial phylogenetic linguistic analysis of 2003 puts the age of Insular Celtic a few centuries earlier, at 2,900 years before present, or slightly earlier than the European Iron Age.

It is not entirely clear if there was ever a "Common Insular Celtic" language, the alternative being that the Celtic settlement of Ireland and Great Britain was undertaken by separate populations speaking separate Celtic dialects from the beginning. However, the "Insular Celtic hypothesis" has been favoured as the most probable scenario in Celtic historical linguistics since the later 20th century (supported by e.g. Cowgill 1975; McCone 1991, 1992; and Schrijver 1995). This would point to a single wave of immigration of early Celts (Hallstatt D) to both Great Britain and Ireland, which however divided into two isolated groups (one in Ireland and one in Great Britain) soon after their arrival, placing the split of Insular Celtic into Goidelic and Brythonic close to 500 BCE. However, this is not the only possible interpretation. In an alternative scenario, the migration could have brought early Celts first to Britain (where a largely undifferentiated Insular Celtic was spoken initially), from whence Ireland was colonised only later. Schrijver has pointed out that according to the absolute chronology of sound changes found in Kenneth Jackson's "Language and History in Early Britain", British and Goidelic were still essentially identical as late as the mid-1st century CE apart from the P/Q isogloss.

The Goidelic branch developed into Primitive Irish, Old Irish and Middle Irish, and only with the historical (medieval) expansion of the Gaels would it split into the modern Gaelic languages (Modern Irish, Scottish Gaelic, Manx). The Brittonic branch developed into Old Welsh, Old Cornish and Old Breton. The Pictish language was closely related to the Brittonic languages, but may have been part of another branch referred to as Pritenic.

=== Genetics ===
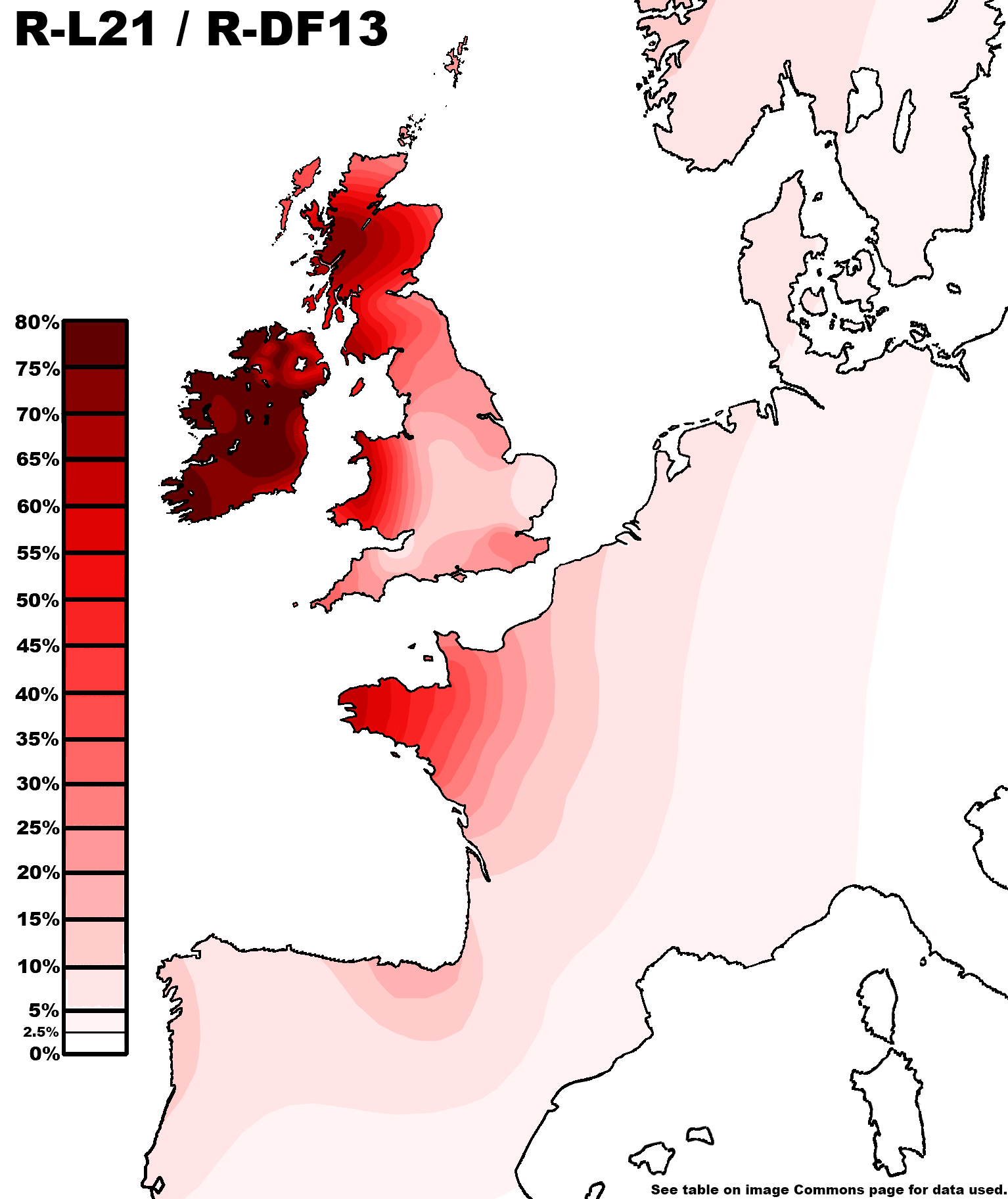
Frequency distribution of Haplogroup R-L21 in Europe

The Insular Celtic peoples are associated with Haplogroup R-L21, a sub-group of R-M269, which has its highest frequencies among the Irish, Scots, Welsh, and Bretons. An archaeogenetics study analyzing ancient DNA found that Bronze Age men buried on Rathlin Island between 2000 and 1500 BC all belonged to Haplogroup R-L21 and were most genetically similar to the modern Irish, Scots and Welsh.

A 2003 study showed that genetic markers associated with Gaelic surnames in Ireland and Scotland are also common in parts of west Wales and England, and are similar to the genetic markers of the Basque people and most different from north Germanic people. Later genetic studies found evidence for some Late Iron Age migration of Celtic (La Tène) people to Britain and on to north-east Ireland.

In 2021, a major archaeogenetics study uncovered a migration into southern Britain in the late Bronze Age, during the 500-year period 1300–800 BC. The newcomers were genetically most similar to ancient individuals from Gaul. During 1000–875 BC, their genetic marker swiftly spread through southern Britain, but not northern Britain. The authors describe this as a "plausible vector for the spread of early Celtic languages into Britain". There was much less inward migration during the Iron Age, so it is likely that Celtic reached Britain before then. Barry Cunliffe suggests that a branch of Celtic was already being spoken in Britain, and that the Bronze Age migration introduced the Brittonic branch.

== Iron Age Britain ==
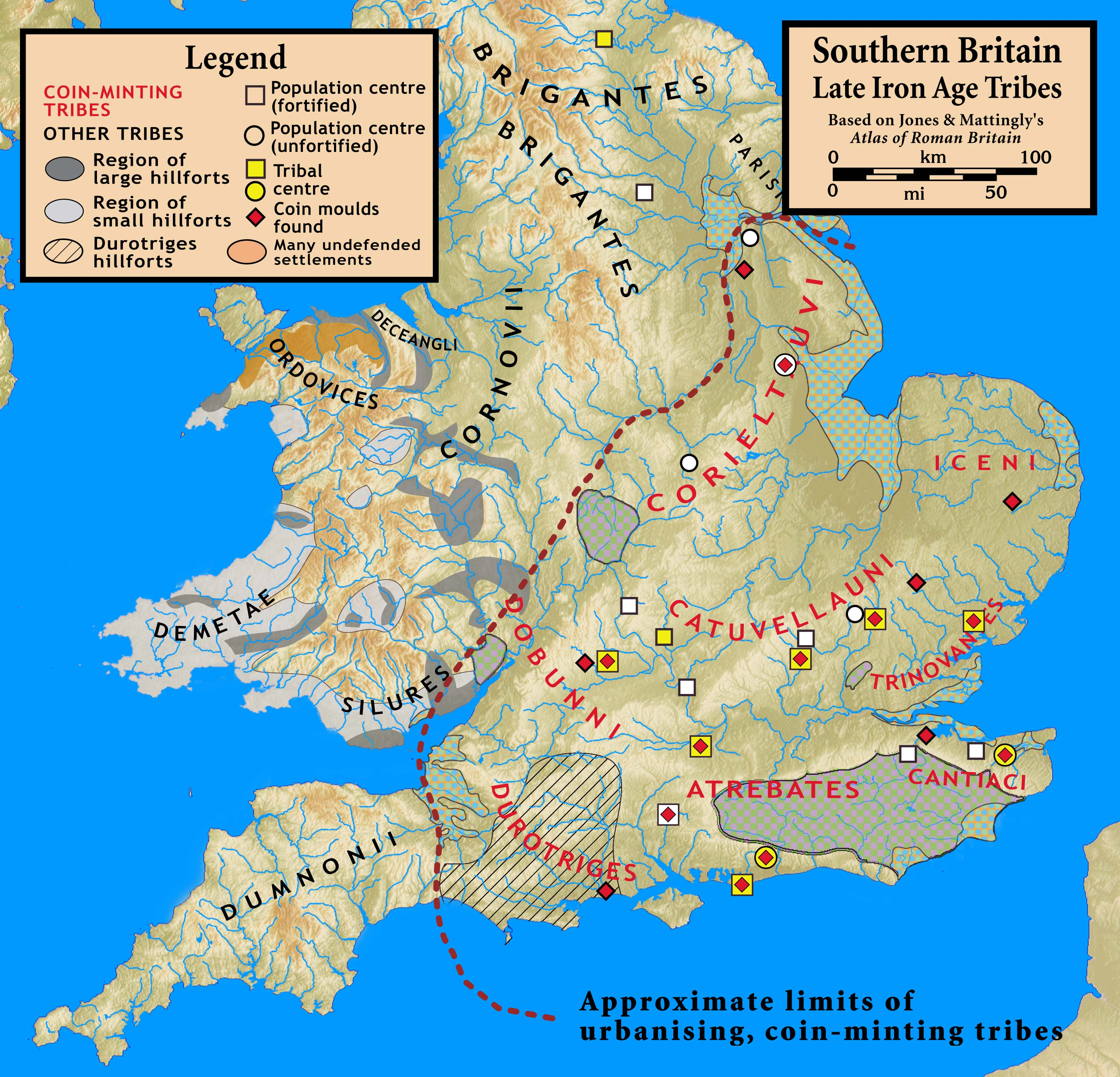
Map of southern Britain in the 1st century BCE

The British Iron Age is a conventional name in the archaeology of Great Britain, typically excluding prehistoric Ireland, which had an independent Iron Age culture of its own. The parallel phase of Irish archaeology is termed the Irish Iron Age.

The British Iron Age lasted in theory from the first significant use of iron for tools and weapons in Britain to the Romanisation of the southern half of the island. The Romanised culture is termed Roman Britain and is considered to supplant the British Iron Age.

The only surviving description of the Iron Age populations of the British Isles is that of Pytheas, who travelled to the region in about 325 BCE. Usually ignored by commentators who suggest Britain was not “Celtic” like France, Pytheas referred to the inhabitants of Britain as Keltoi (Celts).The earliest tribal names on record date to the 1st century CE (Ptolemy, Caesar; to some extent coinage), representing the situation at the moment of Roman conquest.

== Roman era and Early Middle Ages ==
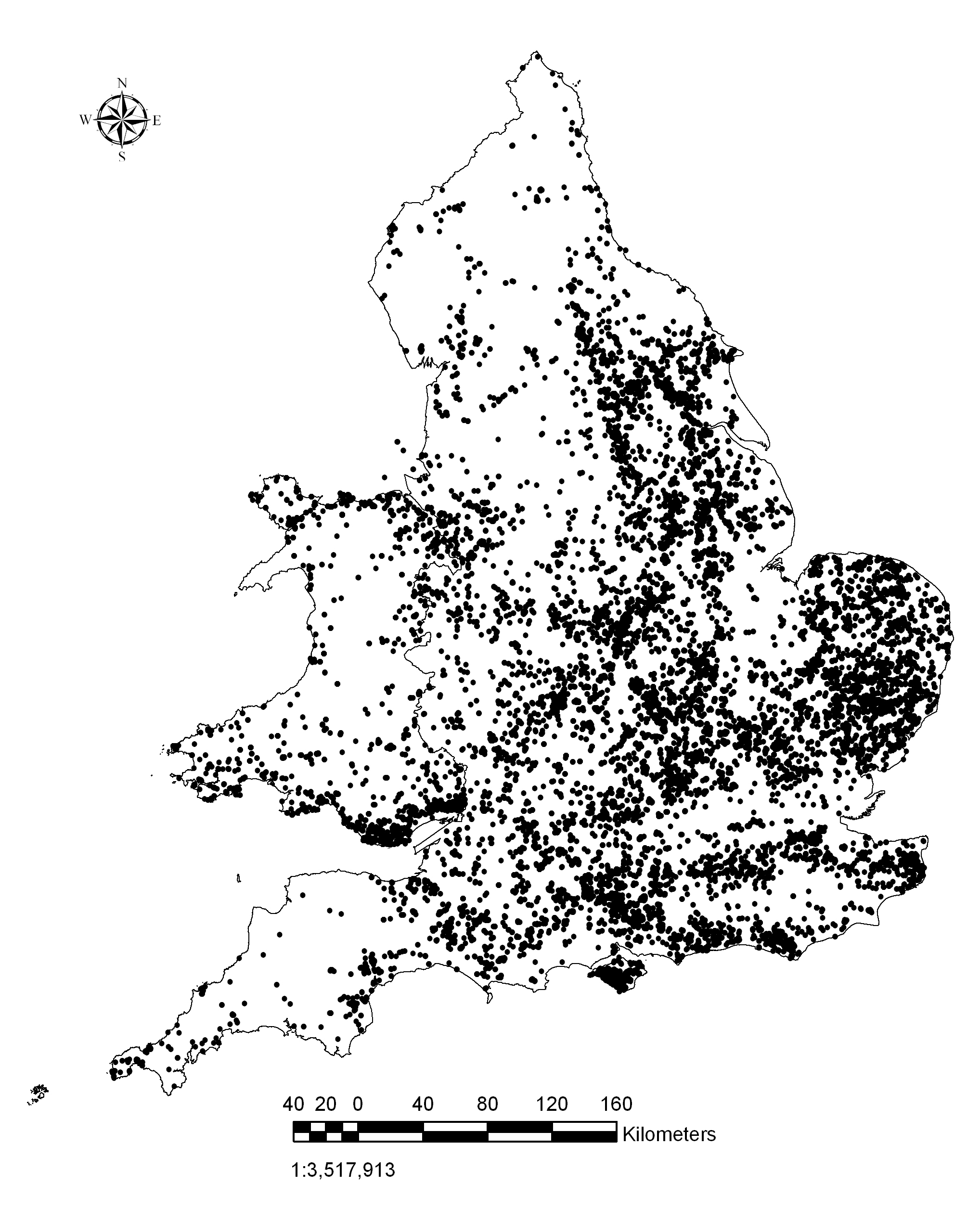
A plot of all locations of Roman coins in Britain found between 1997 and 2010, intended as an illustration of the measure of "Romanization" (Portable Antiquities Scheme)

Roman Britain existed for about four centuries, from the mid 1st to the mid 5th century. This led to the formation of a syncretized Romano-British culture in the southern part of Great Britain, comparable in some aspects to Gallo-Roman culture on the continent. However, while in Gaul, Roman influence was sufficient to almost wholly replace the Gaulish language with Vulgar Latin, this was nowhere near the case in Roman Britain. Although a British Latin dialect was presumably spoken in the population centres of Roman Britain, it did not become influential enough to displace British dialects spoken throughout the country. There did presumably remain pockets of Romance-speaking populations in Britain as late as the 8th century.

Northern Britain (north of Hadrian's Wall) and Ireland would essentially remain in the prehistoric period until after the end of the Roman period. The "protohistoric" period of Ireland can be argued to begin around 400 CE, due to cultural diffusion from Roman Britain, importing writing (ogham, reflecting the earliest records of Primitive Irish) and Christianity. The populations north of Roman Britain are summarized under the term Caledonians (the ancestors of the Picts of later centuries). Very little is known about them other than they posed a constant military threat to the Roman border.

With the Anglo-Saxon invasion and settlement of Great Britain in the 5th and 6th centuries, the British languages were gradually marginalised to the western parts of the island, to what is now Wales and Cornwall. The transition may not necessarily present itself as a mass immigration with a substantial replacement of population, but rather could involve the arrival of a new elite installing their culture and language as a superstrate. A similar process happened as the Gaels installed themselves over the formerly Pictish-speaking populations in Northern Britain. There seems to have been a period of British-Saxon syncretism during the 6th century, with British rulers bearing Saxon names (as in Tewdrig) and Saxon rulers bearing British names (as in Cerdic).

By the end of the Dark Ages, around the 8th century, the Insular Celtic peoples had become the bearers of the Gaelic and Welsh cultures of the historical Gaelic Ireland and Medieval Wales.

== See also ==
- Insular art - embracing much Anglo-Saxon art as well as Celtic art in the post-Roman British Isles
- Celtic toponymy: Insular Celtic
- British toponymy: Celtic
- Goidelic substrate hypothesis
- Insular Celtic languages
- Iron Age Britain
- Genetic history of the British Isles
