= John Weiss Forney =

American newspaper publisher and politician (1817–1881)

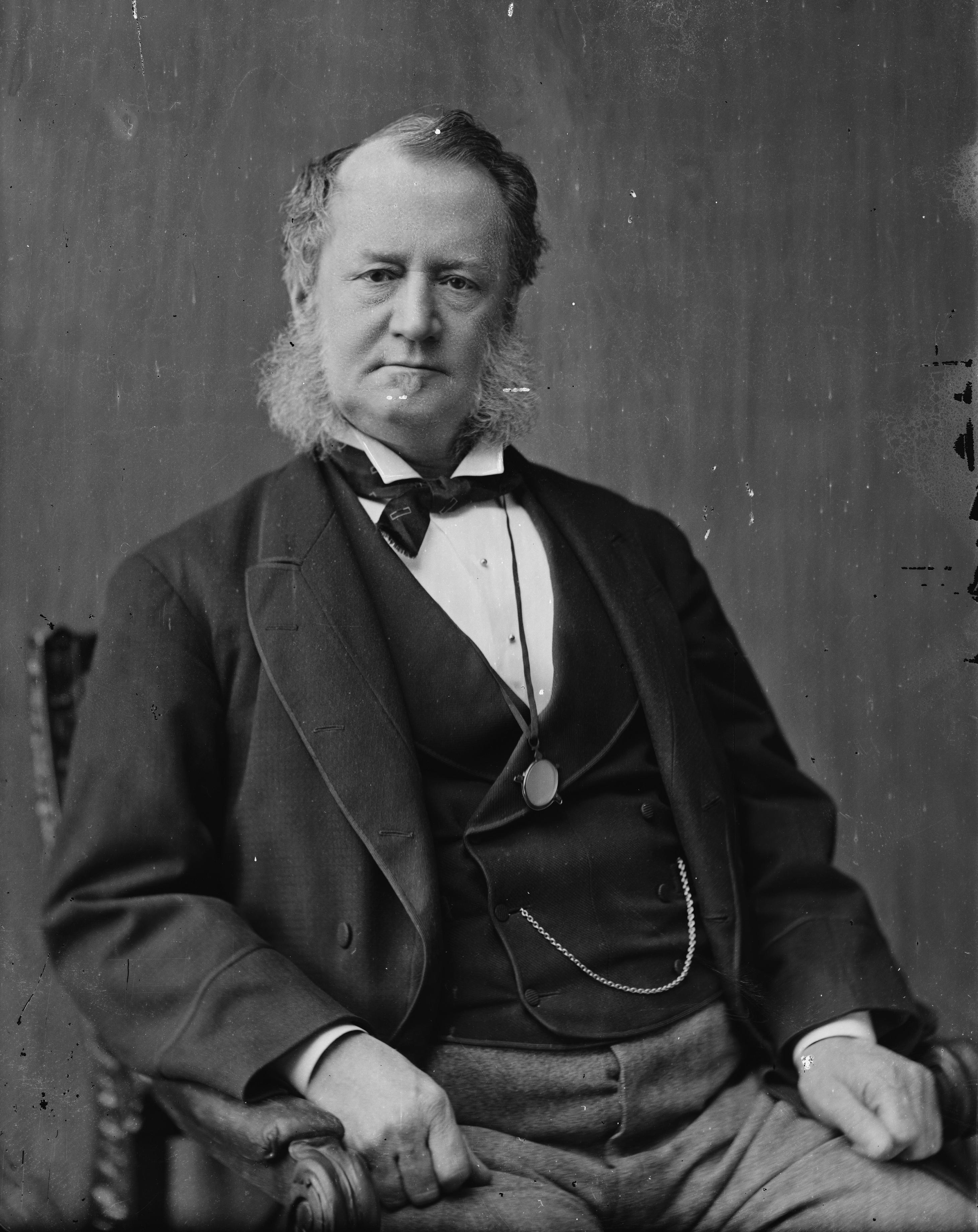

5th Secretary of the United States Senate
- In office July 15, 1861 – June 4, 1868
- Preceded by: Asbury Dickins
- Succeeded by: George Congdon Gorham

Clerk of the United States House of Representatives
- In office February 3, 1860 – July 3, 1861
- Speaker: William Pennington
- Preceded by: James C. Allen
- Succeeded by: Emerson Etheridge
- In office December 1, 1851 – February 2, 1856
- Speaker: Linn Boyd Nathaniel P. Banks
- Preceded by: Richard M. Young
- Succeeded by: William Cullom

Personal details
- Born: September 30, 1817 Lancaster, Pennsylvania, U.S.
- Died: December 9, 1881 (aged 64) Philadelphia, Pennsylvania, U.S.
- Resting place: West Laurel Hill Cemetery, Bala Cynwyd, Pennsylvania, U.S.
- Party: Republican
- Spouse: Elizabeth Reitzer
- Children: James Forney; Tillie May Forney

John Weiss Forney (30 September 1817 – 9 December 1881), also known as John Wien Forney, was an American newspaper publisher and politician. He was the owner of several newspapers including the Intelligencer and Journal, the Pennsylvanian, The Philadelphia Press, the Washington Daily Union, the Sunday Morning Chronicle, and the Progress.

He helped James Buchanan's presidential campaign and served as a Democratic clerk of the United States House of Representatives from 1851 to 1856. He broke with Buchanan over his pro-slavery stance, switched to the Republican Party and served as clerk of the United States House of Representatives as a Republican from 1860 to 1861. He served as the first Republican secretary of the United States Senate from 1861 to 1868.

== Early life ==
He was born September 30, 1817, in Lancaster, Pennsylvania, to Jacob and Margaret (Wien) Forney. He was educated at the local schools in Lancaster. At age 13, he left school and worked at a store. At age eighteen, he joined the Lancaster Journal newspaper as a printers apprentice.

== Career ==
In 1837, he was the co-owner and editor of the Lancaster Intelligencer, and in 1840 he purchased the Journal and combined the two papers under the name of the Intelligencer and Journal. In 1845 President James K. Polk appointed him deputy surveyor of the port of Philadelphia. He sold the Intelligencer and Journal, and purchased a half interest in the Pennsylvanian, a Democratic Party aligned paper, which he edited until 1851.

From 1851 to 1855 he served as a Democratic Clerk of the United States House of Representatives, and, while continuing to write for the Pennsylvanian, he edited the Union, the organ of the Northern Democrats. As Clerk, he presided over a protracted struggle for the speakership in 1855, which resulted in the election of Nathaniel P. Banks. His tact as presiding officer won praise from all parties. He also directed financially lucrative contracts for printing House documents to his newspaper.

In 1856 he was the chairman of the Pennsylvania Democratic Committee. He was instrumental in securing the nomination of Pennsylvania's candidate, James Buchanan. He conducted Buchanan's successful campaign for the presidency, and Buchanan would have given him a cabinet office but he was not seen as sufficiently pro-slavery by politicians from Southern states. In January 1857, Buchanan's influence was not strong enough to win Forney a seat in the United States Senate, which went instead to Simon Cameron. In August 1857, Forney established The Philadelphia Press, an independent Democratic newspaper. During the Civil War, the Press was published as Forney's War Press and was Philadelphia's only newspaper with news only about the war.

At first a Douglas Democrat and a supporter of Buchanan, he broke with Buchanan over his pro-slavery stance and the adoption of the Lecompton Constitution. iHe declined to support the Buchanan administration's effort to secure the admission of Kansas on that basis, and joined the Republican Party. He contributed to the organization of the Republican Party and its early successes. From 1859 to 1861, he served a second time as a Republican clerk of the House. He published in Washington, D.C. the Sunday Morning Chronicle, which in 1862 was changed to a daily, and was throughout the American Civil War looked upon as the organ of the Lincoln administration.

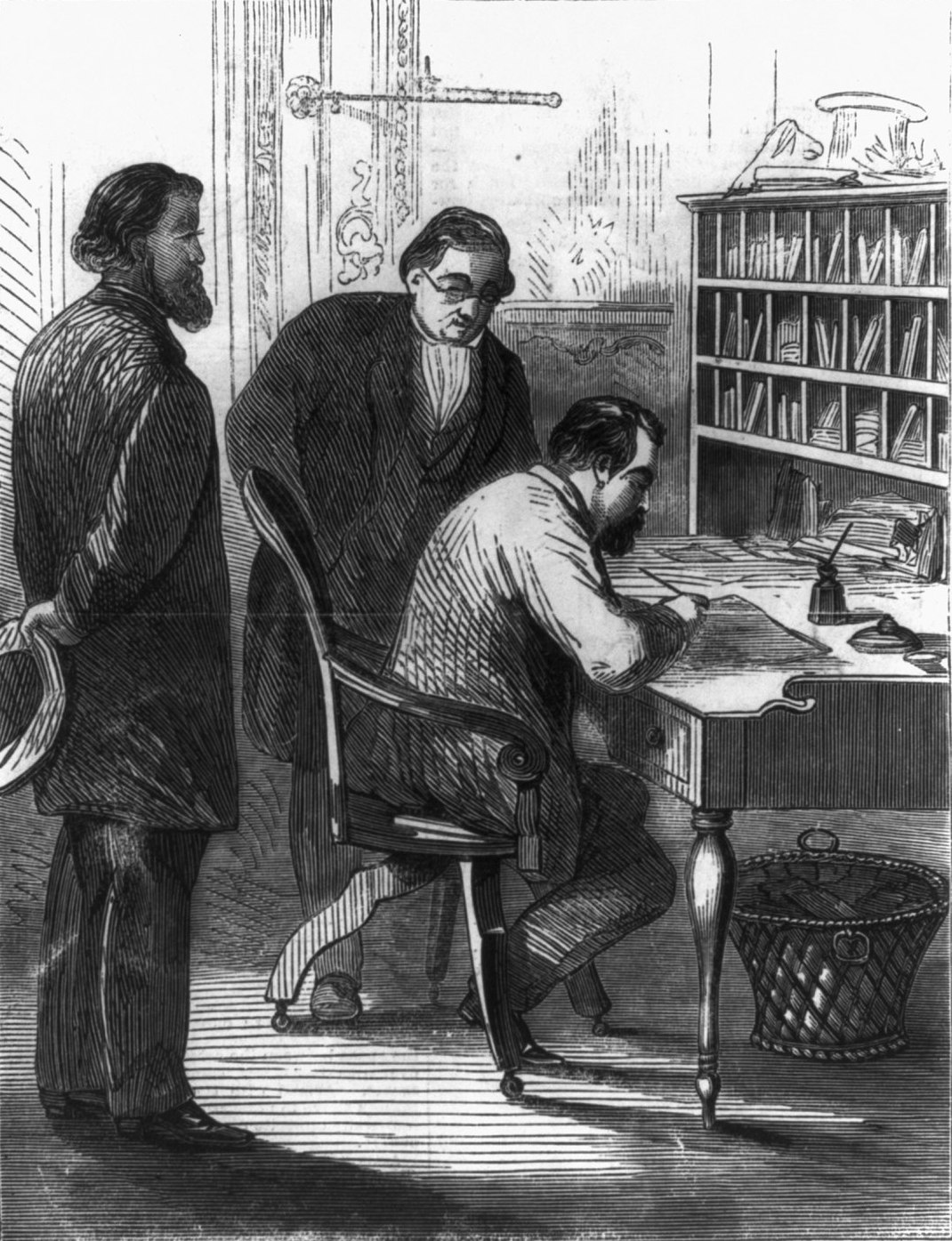
Illustration of Forney preparing a summons for President Andrew Johnson for Johnson's impeachment trial

He served as Secretary of the United States Senate from July 15, 1861, to June 4, 1868. Among the events of his secretariat may be remembered that he was the first to read aloud, in a joint session of Congress, George Washington's Farewell Address, a reading that became traditional after 1888. 'In January 1862, with the Constitution endangered by civil war, a thousand citizens of Philadelphia petitioned Congress to commemorate the forthcoming 130th anniversary of George Washington's birth by providing that “the Farewell Address of Washington be read aloud on the morning of that day in one or the other of the Houses of Congress.” Both houses agreed and assembled in the House of Representatives’ chamber on February 22, 1862, where Secretary of the Senate John W. Forney “rendered ‘The Farewell Address’ very effectively,” as one observer recalled.'

On the death of Lincoln, Forney supported Andrew Johnson for a short time, but afterward became one of the foremost in the struggle which resulted in the president's impeachment. In 1868, no longer Secretary of the Senate, he disposed of his interest in the Chronicle and returned to Philadelphia where in 1871 he was made collector of the port by President Ulysses S. Grant. He held the office for one year, and during that time perfected the system of direct transportation of imports in bond without appraisement and examination at the port of original entry.

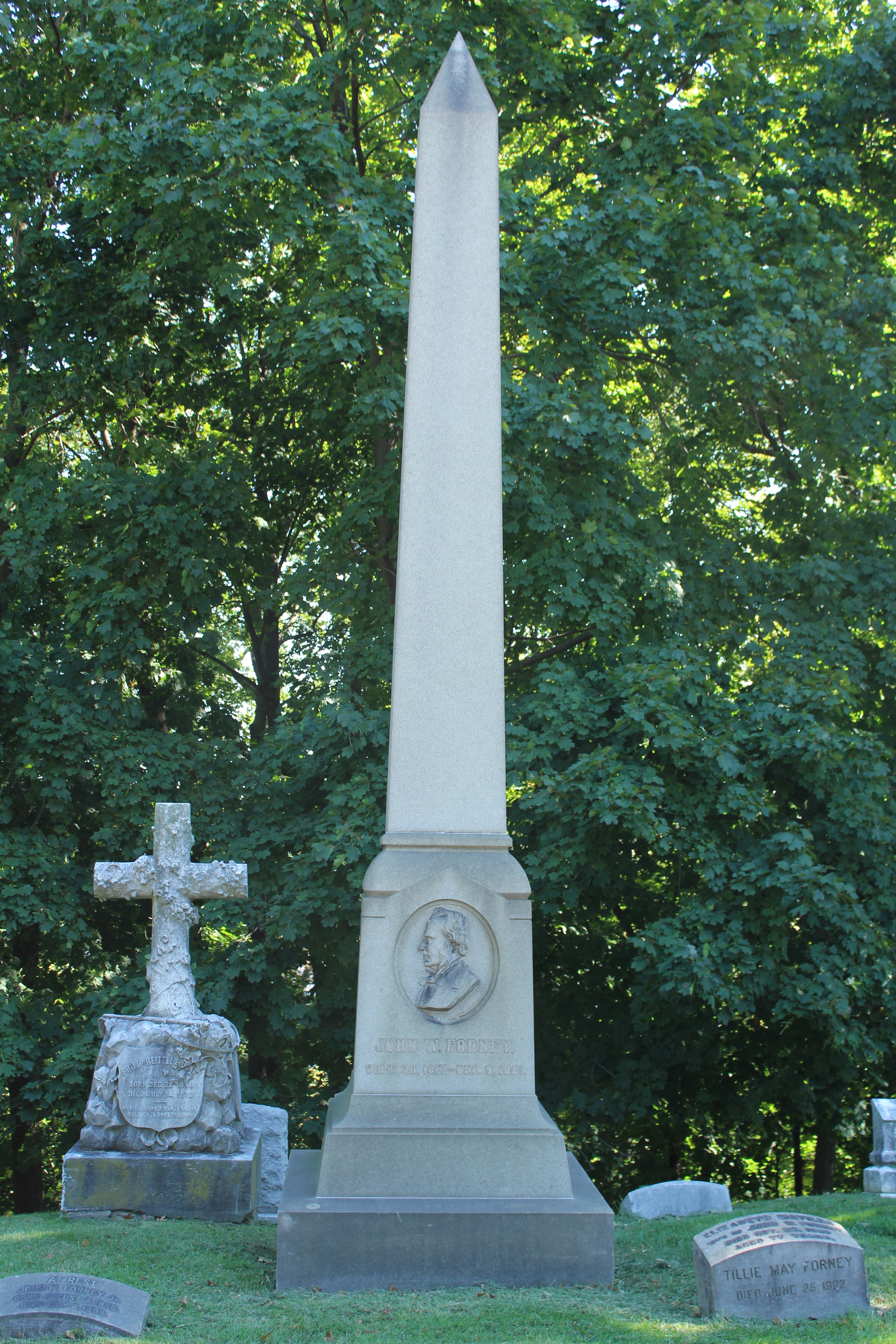
John W. Forney tombstone at West Laurel Hill Cemetery

He was a commissioner of the Centennial Exposition and visited Europe in its interest in 1875. In 1877 he sold the Press and established a weekly, the Progress, which continued to be published by the Forney Publishing Company after his death. In 1880 he left the Republican Party to rejoin the Democratic Party and support Winfield Scott Hancock for the presidency. He died December 9, 1881, in Philadelphia, and was interred in West Laurel Hill Cemetery, in Bala Cynwyd, Pennsylvania.

== Personal life ==
He married Elizabeth Reitzel in 1840 and together they had six children. Their son James Forney, was a colonel in the United States Marine Corps and their daughter Tillie May Forney was a writer and journalist.

== Publications ==
- Address of John W. Forney of Pennsylvania, at the Great Democratic Jubilee, in Honor of the Election of Pierce and King, Held at the City of Washington, November 11, 1852., Washington: Lemuel Towers, 1852
- Forney's War Press, Philadelphia, 1863
- Letters from Europe, Philadelphia: T.B. Peterson & Brothers, 1867
- What I Saw in Texas (1872)
- Anecdotes of Public Men Volume 1, New York: Harper & Brothers, 1873
- A Centennial Commissioner in Europe (Philadelphia, 1876)
- Forty Years of American Journalism (1877)
- The Lesson of Kansas, Philadelphia: Sherman & Co., 1879
- Life & Military Career of Winfield Scott Hancock, Philadelphia; Hubbard Bros, 1880
- The New Nobility. A Story of Europe and America., New York, D. Appleton and Company, 1881

Government offices
Preceded by Richard M. Young	Clerk of the United States House of Representatives; 1851–1856	Succeeded by William Cullom
Preceded by James C. Allen	Clerk of the United States House of Representatives; 1860–1861	Succeeded by Emerson Etheridge
