= Daniel Munroe Forney =

American politician

Daniel Munroe Forney (May 1784 – October 15, 1847) was a United States Congressional Representative from North Carolina. He was born near Lincolnton, North Carolina, in May 1784, the son of Peter Forney.

Forney attended the public schools and the University of North Carolina at Chapel Hill. He engaged in agricultural pursuits and served as a major in the War of 1812. He held several local offices. He was elected as a Democratic-Republican to the Fourteenth and Fifteenth Congresses and served from March 4, 1815, until his resignation in 1818. He was appointed by President James Monroe as a commissioner to treat with the Creek Indians in 1820. He served as a member of the North Carolina State senate, 1823–1826. He moved to Alabama in 1834 and settled in Lowndes County where he resumed agricultural pursuits and became interested in various business enterprises.

Forney died in Lowndes County on October 15, 1847, and was interred in the family burying ground there. He was the uncle of William Henry Forney.

His home in Lincoln County, North Carolina, Ingleside built about 1817, was listed on the National Register of Historic Places in 1972.

== See also ==
- Fourteenth United States Congress
- Fifteenth United States Congress

U.S. House of Representatives
Preceded by Peter Forney	Member of the U.S. House of Representatives from North Carolina's 11th congressional district 1815–1818	Succeeded by William Davidson
