= James Forney =

United States Marine Corps general

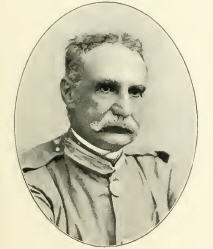
- Born: January 17, 1844; Lancaster, Pennsylvania, U.S.
- Died: February 2, 1921 (aged 77)
- Relatives: John Weiss Forney (father); Tillie May Forney (sister)
- Military career
- Allegiance: United States of America
- Branch: United States Marine Corps
- Service years: 1861 - 1904
- Rank: Brigadier General
- Conflicts: American Civil War
- Awards: Marine Corps Brevet Medal

James Forney (January 17, 1844 – February 2, 1921) was an American officer serving in the United States Marine Corps during the American Civil War. He was approved to receive the Marine Corps Brevet Medal for bravery but died before it could be presented.

== Biography ==
Forney was born January 17, 1844, in Lancaster, Pennsylvania, to John Weiss Forney and Elizabeth Reitzel Forney. He accepted a commission in the Marine Corps in 1861, serving continuously for 43 years. Forney was approved to receive the Brevet Medal for gallantry in the Civil War, but died before it could be presented. This meant that Percival Pope would be the only brevet medal recipient from the Civil War to actually receive the Medal. Since the brevet medal was not presented posthumously it was never given to his family and instead placed on display in the National Museum.

While a First Lieutenant Forney was assigned the Western Gulf Squadron aboard the Steam sloop Brooklyn.

When the fleet sailed past Vicksburg, Mississippi, on June 28, 1862, the Confederate cannons stationed there opened fire on the ships and several marines were injured. Forney was one of the Marine officers manning the broad-side guns and returned fire on the Confederate forces.

After the Civil War, Forney joined the Pennsylvania Commandery of the Military Order of the Loyal Legion of the United States and was assigned insignia number 897.

On September 3, 1895 Secretary Herbert approved for Colonel Forney to be court martialed for Negligence in caring for government property. The charges were submitted by the Commandant of the Marine Corps, Colonel Heywood on the grounds that he had sent large amounts of fuel and bed linens to his personal residence while he was the Commandant of Marines at the Brooklyn Navy Yard. At the time Forney was the second highest-ranking officer in the Marine Corps and held the position of Commandant of Marines at the Portsmouth Navy Yard. The court martial was held on the Brooklyn Navy Yard.

On November 19, 1895, Forney was found guilty of the charges, received an official reprimand from Secretary Herbert, and was restored to duty.

During the Spanish–American War he commanded the Marine Barracks at the Portsmouth Navy Yard in Kittery, Maine was responsible for securing Spanish prisoners captured after the Battle of Santiago de Cuba. He later commanded the Marine Barracks at the League Island Navy Yard in Philadelphia.

In 1898 he became a Veteran Companion of the Military Order of Foreign Wars.

Forney retired from the Marine Corps as a brigadier general in 1904.

He died in Philadelphia on February 2, 1921, at the age of 77.

== Awards ==
- Marine Corps Brevet Medal (posthumous)
- Civil War Campaign Medal
- Spanish Campaign Medal

== Promotions ==
Second Lieutenant, 1 March 1861. First Lieutenant, 1 September 1861. Captain, 23 April 1864. Major, 24 February 1884. Lieutenant Colonel, 30 January 1891. Colonel, 11 July 1892.

Brevet Captain, 24 April 1862, for gallant and meritorious services at the attack upon Forts Jackson and St. Philip, 24 April 1862. Brevet Major, 15 April 1869, for meritorious services in defeating a rebel raid at Gunpowder Bridge, in July, 1864. Brevet Lieutenant Colonel, 15 March 1870, for gallant and meritorious services in the action with the savages at Formosa, 13 July 1867.

== Marine Corps Brevet Medal citation ==
=== Secretary of the Navy citation ===
Citation

The Secretary of the Navy takes pleasure in transmitting to First Lieutenant James Forney, United States Marine Corps, the Brevet Medal which is awarded in accordance with Marine Corps Order No. 26 (1921), for gallantry and meritorious service in the attack upon Forts Jackson and St. Philip on 24 April 1862. On 2 March 1867 First Lieutenant James Forney is appointed Captain, by brevet, to take rank from 11 June 1898. For gallant and meritorious services in action with the savages at Formosa, on 13 June 1867, Captain James Forney is appointed Major, by brevet, to rank from 15 April 1869. For meritorious services in defeating an enemy raid at Gunpowder River in July 1864, Major Forney is appointed Lieutenant Colonel, by brevet, to rank from 25 March 1870.
