= Tillie May Forney =

American journalist (1862-1922)

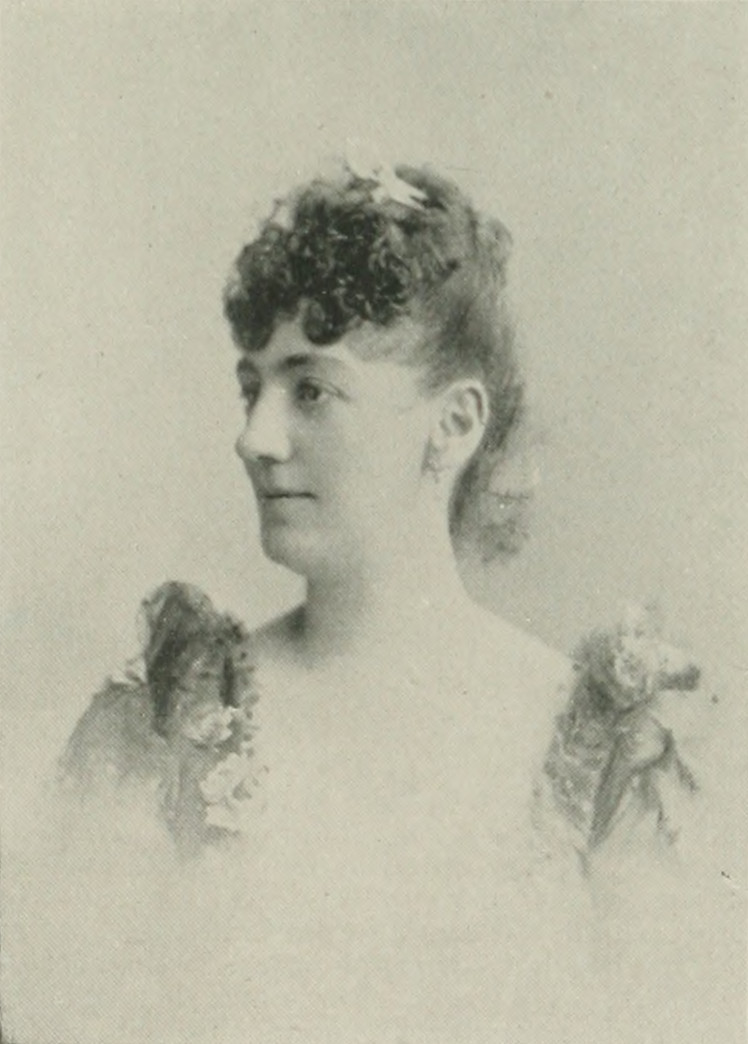
- Born: May 17, 1862; Washington, D.C., U.S.
- Died: June 25, 1922 (aged 60)
- Resting place: West Laurel Hill Cemetery, Bala Cynwyd, Pennsylvania, U.S.
- Occupation: journalist
- Relatives: John Weiss Forney (father); James Forney (brother)

Matilda May Forney (May 17, 1862 - June 25, 1922) was an American writer, journalist, and editor of the magazine Table Talk.

== Early life and education ==
Forney was born in Washington, D.C., on May 17, 1862, the youngest child of John Weiss Forney and Elizabeth Matilda Reitzel. She graduated from Miss Carr's Academy on Old York Road in Pennsylvania.

== Career ==
Forney wrote regularly for publications and prominent journals from early childhood. She served as her father's amanuensis, both in the United States and during his travels in Europe. She was a contributor to notable magazines in New York City, Philadelphia, and the West Coast. She was a regular contributor to The Progress which was established by her father. She was editor of Table Talk and wrote articles on topics including "New Things for Table and Kitchen" and "Fashionable Dinner and Tea Toilets".

Forney died on June 25, 1922, and was interred with her parents at West Laurel Hill Cemetery in Bala Cynwyd, Pennsylvania.

== Personal life ==
Forney lived with her widowed mother in the family residence, at 618 Locust Street in the Washington Square section of Philadelphia. Her brother James Forney was a colonel in the United States Marine Corps.

== Publications ==
- Entrancing Month When Thoughts Are Hazy and Hands Long to be Idle, Table Talk, Arthur H. Crist Company, Pages 269-271, 1899
