= Peter Forney =

American politician

Peter Forney (April 21, 1756 – February 1, 1834) was a U.S. representative from North Carolina; born near Lincolnton, North Carolina, April 21, 1756; attended the public schools; served as a captain during the Revolutionary War; engaged in the manufacture of iron; member of the North Carolina House of Commons 1794–1796; served in the North Carolina Senate in 1801 and 1802; elected as a Democratic-Republican to the 13th Congress (March 4, 1813 – March 3, 1815); declined to be a candidate in 1814 for reelection to the 14th Congress; retired from public life; died at his country home, "Mount Welcome," in Lincoln County, North Carolina, on February 1, 1834; interment in the private burying ground on his estate.

He was the father of Daniel M. Forney and grandfather of William H. Forney.

U.S. House of Representatives
Preceded by Israel Pickens	Member of the U.S. House of Representatives from North Carolina's 11th congressional district 1813–1815	Succeeded by Daniel M. Forney
