= Lincoln County, North Carolina =

County in North Carolina, United States

- County
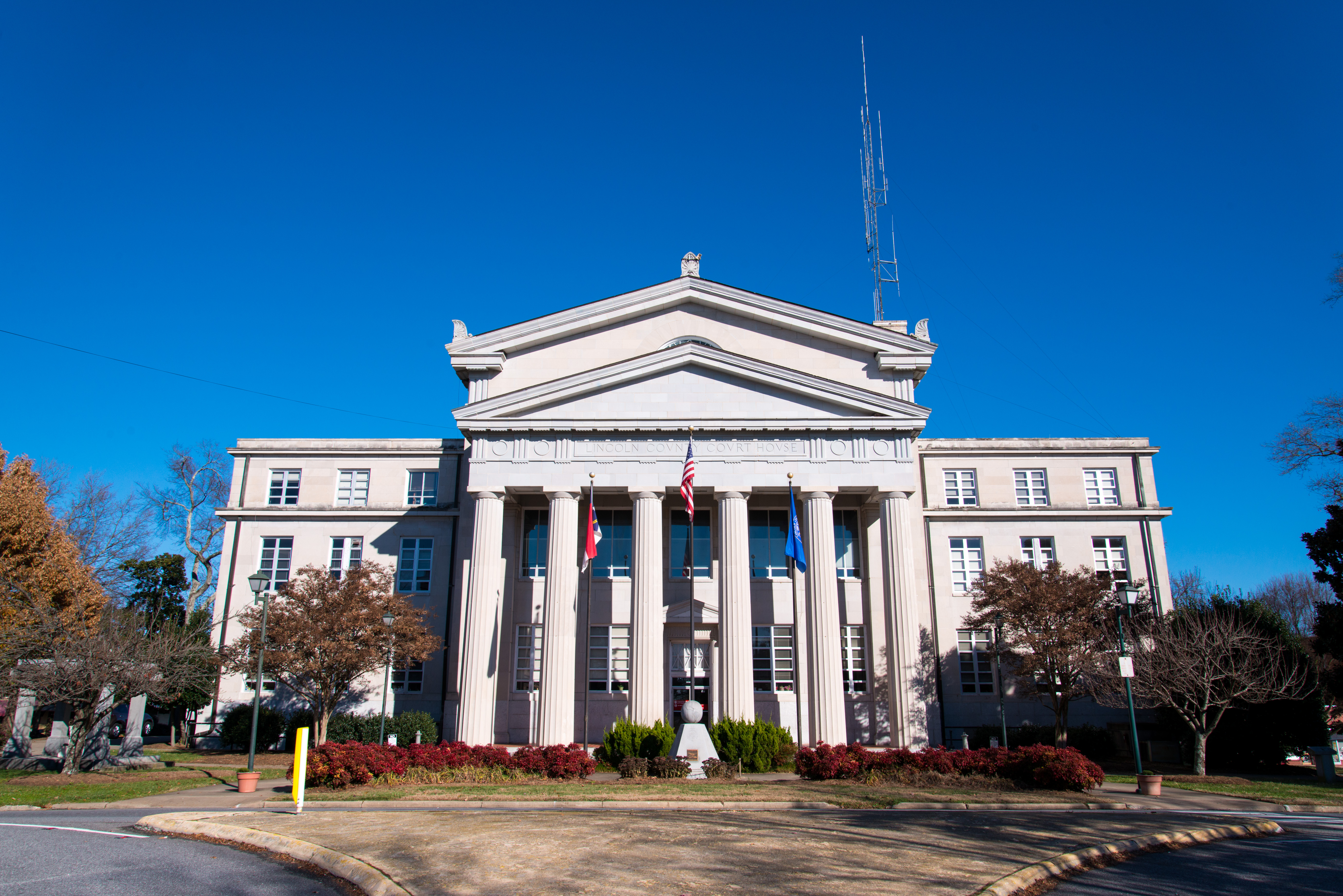
- Lincoln County Courthouse

- Flag Seal

- Location within the U.S. state of North Carolina
- Interactive map of Lincoln County, North Carolina
- Coordinates: 35.49°N 81.23°W
- Country: United States
- State: North Carolina
- Founded: 1779
- Named for: Benjamin Lincoln
- Seat: Lincolnton
- Largest community: Lincolnton

Area
  - Total: 304.87 sq mi (789.6 km^{2})
  - Land: 295.85 sq mi (766.2 km^{2})
  - Water: 9.02 sq mi (23.4 km^{2}) 2.96%

Population (2020)
  - Total: 86,810
  - Estimate (2025): 98,654 ▲
  - Density: 293.4/sq mi (113.3/km^{2})
- Time zone: UTC−5 (Eastern)
  - Summer (DST): UTC−4 (EDT)
- Congressional district: 10th
- Website: www.lincolncounty.org

Lincoln County is a county located in the U.S. state of North Carolina. As of the 2020 census, the population was 86,810, making it the most populous "Lincoln County" in the United States. Its county seat is Lincolnton. Lincoln County is included in the Charlotte-Concord-Gastonia, NC-SC Metropolitan Statistical Area.

== History ==
The county was formed in 1779 from the eastern part of Tryon County, which had been settled by Europeans in the mid-18th Century. It was named for Benjamin Lincoln, a general in the American Revolutionary War. During the American Revolution, the Battle of Ramsour's Mill occurred near a grist mill in Lincolnton.

In 1782 the southeastern part of Burke County was annexed to Lincoln County. In 1841, parts of Lincoln County and Rutherford County were combined to form Cleveland County. In 1842, the northern third of Lincoln County became Catawba County. In 1846, the southern half of what was left of Lincoln County became Gaston County.

== Geography ==
According to the U.S. Census Bureau, the county has a total area of 304.87 square miles (789.6 km^{2}), of which 295.85 square miles (766.2 km^{2}) is land and 9.02 square miles (23.4 km^{2}) (2.96%) is water.

=== State and local protected areas ===
- Mountain Island Educational State Forest (part)
- Pee Wee's Mountain Bike Trail
- Rock Springs Nature Preserve
- South Fork Rail Trail

=== Major water bodies ===
- Anderson Creek
- Ballard Creek
- Buffalo Creek
- Catawba River
- Crooked Creek
- Howard Creek
- Hoyle Creek
- Indian Creek
- Killian Creek
- Lake Norman
- Little Indian Creek
- South Fork Catawba River
- Tanyard Creek

=== Adjacent counties ===
- Catawba County – north
- Iredell County – northeast
- Mecklenburg County – southeast
- Gaston County – south
- Cleveland County – west
- Burke County – northwest

=== Major highways ===
- US 321
- US 321 Bus.
- NC 10
- NC 16
- NC 16 Bus. (business route)
- NC 18
- NC 27
- NC 27 Truck (truck route)
- NC 73
- NC 150
- NC 155
- NC 182
- NC 274

=== Major infrastructure ===
- Lincoln County Airport

== Demographics ==
Historical population
Census	Pop.	Note	%±
1790	9,246		—
1800	12,660		36.9%
1810	16,359		29.2%
1820	18,147		10.9%
1830	22,455		23.7%
1840	25,160		12.0%
1850	7,746		−69.2%
1860	8,195		5.8%
1870	9,573		16.8%
1880	11,061		15.5%
1890	12,586		13.8%
1900	15,498		23.1%
1910	17,132		10.5%
1920	17,862		4.3%
1930	22,872		28.0%
1940	24,187		5.7%
1950	27,459		13.5%
1960	28,814		4.9%
1970	32,682		13.4%
1980	42,372		29.6%
1990	50,319		18.8%
2000	63,780		26.8%
2010	78,265		22.7%
2020	86,810		10.9%
2025 (est.)	98,654	▲	13.6%
U.S. Decennial Census; 1790–1960 1900–1990; 1990–2000 2010 2020

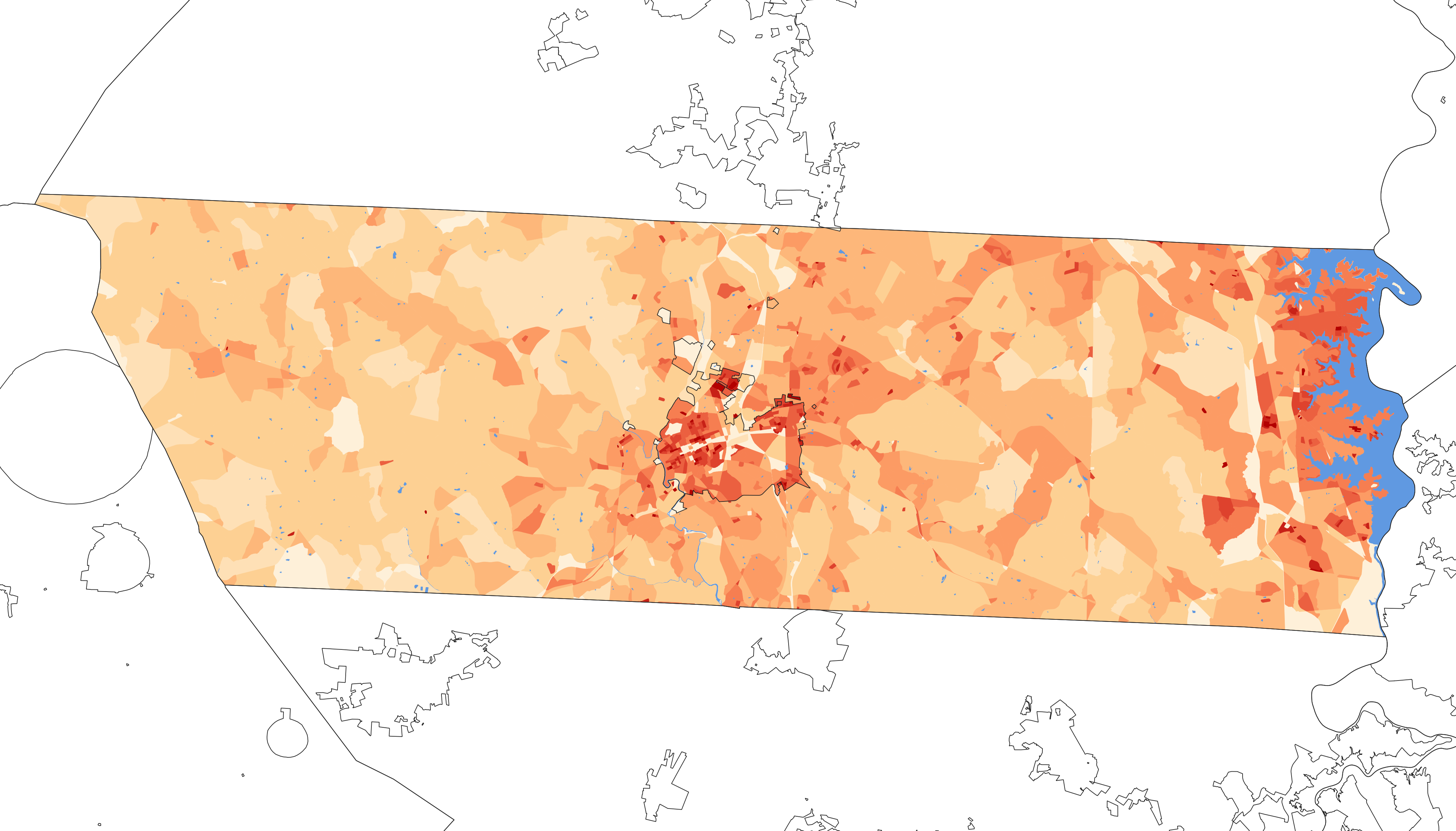

=== 2020 census ===
Lincoln County, North Carolina – Racial and ethnic composition Note: the US Census treats Hispanic/Latino as an ethnic category. This table excludes Latinos from the racial categories and assigns them to a separate category. Hispanics/Latinos may be of any race.
Race / Ethnicity (NH = Non-Hispanic)	Pop 1980	Pop 1990	Pop 2000	Pop 2010	Pop 2020	% 1980	% 1990	% 2000	% 2010	% 2020
White alone (NH)	38,156	45,359	55,290	67,139	71,661	90.05%	90.14%	86.69%	85.78%	82.55%
Black or African American alone (NH)	3,793	4,096	4,067	4,269	4,405	8.95%	8.14%	6.38%	5.45%	5.07%
Native American or Alaska Native alone (NH)	37	118	154	222	237	0.09%	0.23%	0.24%	0.28%	0.27%
Asian alone (NH)	63	164	188	415	692	0.15%	0.33%	0.29%	0.53%	0.80%
Native Hawaiian or Pacific Islander alone (NH)	x	x	8	13	15	x	x	0.01%	0.02%	0.02%
Other race alone (NH)	17	12	57	89	208	0.04%	0.02%	0.09%	0.11%	0.24%
Mixed race or Multiracial (NH)	x	x	360	880	3,180	x	x	0.56%	1.12%	3.66%
Hispanic or Latino (any race)	306	570	3,656	5,238	6,412	0.72%	1.13%	5.73%	6.69%	7.39%
Total	42,372	50,319	63,780	78,265	86,810	100.00%	100.00%	100.00%	100.00%	100.00%

As of the 2020 census, there were 86,810 people, 34,306 households, and 24,445 families residing in the county.

The median age was 44.2 years. 21.2% of residents were under the age of 18 and 19.0% of residents were 65 years of age or older. For every 100 females there were 97.9 males, and for every 100 females age 18 and over there were 96.0 males age 18 and over.

The racial makeup of the county was 83.8% White, 5.2% Black or African American, 0.4% American Indian and Alaska Native, 0.8% Asian, <0.1% Native Hawaiian and Pacific Islander, 3.5% from some other race, and 6.4% from two or more races. Hispanic or Latino residents of any race comprised 7.4% of the population.

26.3% of residents lived in urban areas, while 73.7% lived in rural areas.

There were 34,306 households in the county, of which 29.9% had children under the age of 18 living in them. Of all households, 56.1% were married-couple households, 15.8% were households with a male householder and no spouse or partner present, and 22.0% were households with a female householder and no spouse or partner present. About 23.2% of all households were made up of individuals and 10.7% had someone living alone who was 65 years of age or older.

There were 37,170 housing units, of which 7.7% were vacant. Among occupied housing units, 76.7% were owner-occupied and 23.3% were renter-occupied. The homeowner vacancy rate was 1.3% and the rental vacancy rate was 6.4%.

=== 2010 census ===
At the 2010 census, there were 78,265 people, 30,343 households, and 22,221 families residing in the county. The population density was 261.76 people per square mile (101.07 people/km^{2}). There were 33,641 housing units at an average density of 112.51 units per square mile (43.44 units/km^{2}). The racial makeup of the county was 89.4% White, 5.5% Black or African American, 0.3% Native American, 0.5% Asian, 0.02% Pacific Islander, 2.7% from other races, and 1.6% from two or more races. 6.7% of the population were Hispanic or Latino of any race.

There were 30,343 households, out of which 30.6% had children under the age of 18 living with them, 57.2% were married couples living together, 11.1% had a female householder with no husband present, and 26.8% were non-families. 22.3% of all households were made up of individuals, and 8.4% had someone living alone who was 65 years of age or older. The average household size was 2.56 and the average family size was 2.97.

In the county, the population was spread out, with 23.6% under the age of 18, 7.5% from 18 to 24, 26.2% from 25 to 44, 29.5% from 45 to 64, and 13.2% who were 65 years of age or older. The median age was 40.4 years. For every 100 females there were 98.4 males. For every 100 females age 18 and over, there were 95.8 males.

The median income for a household in the county was $42,456, and the median income for a family was $48,298. Males had a median income of $41,441 versus $30,480 for females. The per capita income for the county was $21,861. About 10.4% of families and 15.8% of the population were below the poverty line, as well as 25.3% of those under age 18 and 8.7% of those age 65 or over.

== Politics ==
Lincoln County is heavily Republican and the last Democratic presidential candidate to win it was Jimmy Carter in 1976, who won it by 58.37%.

United States presidential election results for Lincoln County, North Carolina
Year	Republican		Democratic		Third party(ies)	
Year	No.	%	No.	%	No.	%
1912	49	2.03%	1,280	53.11%	1,081	44.85%
1916	1,369	47.22%	1,521	52.47%	9	0.31%
1920	3,137	48.50%	3,331	51.50%	0	0.00%
1924	2,658	47.39%	2,909	51.86%	42	0.75%
1928	3,930	57.43%	2,913	42.57%	0	0.00%
1932	3,563	44.56%	4,399	55.02%	34	0.43%
1936	3,501	38.83%	5,515	61.17%	0	0.00%
1940	3,099	38.74%	4,901	61.26%	0	0.00%
1944	3,678	46.88%	4,168	53.12%	0	0.00%
1948	3,635	43.49%	3,570	42.71%	1,153	13.80%
1952	6,228	53.61%	5,389	46.39%	0	0.00%
1956	6,637	53.20%	5,838	46.80%	0	0.00%
1960	6,816	50.32%	6,728	49.68%	0	0.00%
1964	5,869	44.55%	7,304	55.45%	0	0.00%
1968	6,188	46.20%	4,044	30.19%	3,161	23.60%
1972	8,597	61.88%	5,100	36.71%	195	1.40%
1976	6,682	41.22%	9,462	58.37%	66	0.41%
1980	9,009	52.39%	7,796	45.34%	391	2.27%
1984	12,621	67.64%	5,996	32.13%	42	0.23%
1988	11,651	64.26%	6,444	35.54%	35	0.19%
1992	11,018	49.29%	8,150	36.46%	3,187	14.26%
1996	11,439	54.86%	7,721	37.03%	1,690	8.11%
2000	15,951	65.03%	8,412	34.29%	166	0.68%
2004	20,052	67.79%	9,434	31.89%	93	0.31%
2008	23,631	66.01%	11,713	32.72%	454	1.27%
2012	25,267	68.71%	11,024	29.98%	484	1.32%
2016	28,806	71.97%	9,897	24.73%	1,320	3.30%
2020	36,341	72.37%	13,274	26.43%	602	1.20%
2024	40,183	72.29%	14,842	26.70%	557	1.00%

== Law and government ==
Lincoln County is governed by a five-member county board of commissioners, a seven-member school board, and five supervisors on the water and soil conservation district. The county's judiciary is represented by two superior court judges and six circuit court judges. Other offices include the district attorney, county clerk, sheriff, and register of deeds.

Every countywide office is held by a Republican, and the only Democratic official that holds office in the county is Lincolnton Mayor Ed Hatley, who has been the city's mayor since 2015.

In 2018, former Lincolnton city council member Mary Frances White became the first African American elected official in the county's history. She served one term on the city council for ward one, and ran for re-election in 2022, but lost to Kevin Demeny by 334 votes.

Lincoln County is a member of the regional Centralina Council of Governments.

=== Office Holders ===
==== Board of Education ====
District	Member	Party	Last elected	Term expires
District at-large	Tony A. Jenkins	Republican	2022	2026
District at-large	Erin A. Long	Republican	2024	2028
District 1	Brandi A. Wyant	Republican	2024	2028
District 2	Fred E. Jarrett, Jr.	Republican	2022	2026
District 3	Christina H. Sutton (Chairperson)	Republican	2024	2028
District 4	Kevin H. Sanders	Republican	2024	2028
District 5	Krista S. Heavner (Vice- Chairperson)	Republican	2022	2026

There are seven members, two of which become chair, and vice-chair of the board. There are five individual districts, and two at-large districts, but all seven board members are elected countywide with four-year terms.

On August 5, 2021, The North Carolina General Assembly ratified House Bill 244 / SL 2021-99 which went into effect in the beginning of 2022, changing the election method for the Lincoln County Board of Education from non-partisan to partisan.

==== County Board of Commissioners ====
Commissioner	Party	Last elected	Term expires
Jamie Lineberger (Chairperson)	Republican	2022	December 2026
Bud Cesena (Vice-chairperson)	Republican	2022	December 2026
Mark Mullen	Republican	2024	December 2028
Trent Carpenter	Republican	2024	December 2028
Alex Patton	Republican	2024	December 2028
Jennifer Farmer (Clerk to the Board)			

Commissioners serve four-year terms.

==== Soil and Water Conservation ====
Seat	Supervisor	Most Recent Status	Elected or appointed	Calculated Term
1	Tommy Houser	Active	Appointed	December 1, 2022 to November 30, 2026
2	George Sain	Active	Elected	December 1, 2024 to November 30, 2028
3	Leonard Keever	Active	Elected	December 1, 2022 to November 30, 2026
4	Sean Nesbit	Active	Elected	December 1, 2022 to November 30, 2026
5	Patty Dellinger	Active	Appointed	December 1 2024 to November 30, 2028

Members of the water and soil conservation serve a four year term, no term limits. Three are elected and two are appointed by the state commission.

This is the only elected office in the county that is non-partisan.

==== Other Offices ====
Office	Holder	Party	Last elected	Term expires
Clerk of Court	Fred Hatley	Republican	2022	December 2026
District Attorney	Mike Miller	Republican	2022	December 2026
Register of Deeds	Danny R. Hester	Republican	2022	December 2026
Sheriff	Bill Beam	Republican	2022	December 2026

These officials are elected and serve four year terms.

=== Judicial ===
==== District Court ====
Seat	Judge	Party	Last elected	Term expires
Seat 1	Micah J. Sanderson	Republican	2022	2026
Seat 2	Brittany Waters Padgett	Republican	2024	2028
Seat 3	Jeanette R. Reeves	Republican	2024	2028
Seat 4	J. Brad Champion	Republican	2024	2028
Seat 5	Jamie Hodges	Republican	2024	2028
Seat 6	Justin K. Brackett	Republican	2024	2028

District Court Judges are elected, and serve four year terms.

==== Superior Court ====
Seat	Judge	Party	Last elected	Term expires
1	Sally Kirby-Turner	Republican	2024	December 2032
2	W. Todd Pomeroy	Republican	2024	December 2032

Lincoln County is in the 39th Superior Court District. It consists of both Lincoln and Cleveland County.

Judges are elected, and serve eight year terms.

=== General Assembly ===
Lincoln County is currently represented by the 97th House District, and 44th Senate District in the North Carolina General Assembly.

==== North Carolina House of Representatives ====
District	Holder	Party	Last elected	Term expires
97th	Heather Rhyne	Republican	2025	2027

North Carolina's 97th House district is entirely limited to Lincoln County and has been since 2003. The district overlaps with the 44th state senate district.

Current representative Heather Rhyne has represented the district since 2024. She is a former member and chairperson of the Lincoln County Board of Education. In 2024, She was selected by the Lincoln County GOP Executive Committee to fill out the remainder of former State House Rep. Jason Saine’s unexpired term. Saine who's served the single county house district since 2011 decided to resign on July 15, 2024, after the North Carolina General Assembly was unable to pass a budget update for the 2024 session despite the GOP having the supermajority at the time. In November 2024, Rhyne ran unopposed and easily won her first election in the district with 43,332 votes.

==== North Carolina Senate ====
District	Holder	Party	Last elected	Term expires
44th	Ted Alexander	Republican	2024	2027

The 44th district has covered all of Lincoln, and Cleveland counties, along with northwest Gaston county since 2019. The district overlaps with the 97th, 110th, and 111th state house districts.

Current representative Ted Alexander has represented the district since 2019. Alexander previously served two terms as mayor of Shelby, North Carolina as well as chair of the Cleveland County Republican Party. He won his first election in November 2018 with 68.5% of the vote against Democratic opponent David Lattimore who received 31.15% of the vote. Alexander won his most recent election in 2024 with 72.50% of the vote against Democratic opponent Henry Herzberg who received 27.50% of the vote.

=== Federal Representatives ===
==== United States House of Representatives ====
District	Holder	Party	Incumbent since	Term expires
10th	Pat Harrigan	Republican	2025	2027

All of Lincoln County is represented in congress by the 10th congressional district.

==== United States Senate ====
Holder	Party	Incumbent since	Term ends
Thom Tillis	Republican	2015	2027
Ted Budd	Republican	2023	2029

== Controversy ==
In February 2020, the Lincoln County Sheriff's Department received media attention when surveillance video was released showing first a pair of Atrium Health security guards assaulting a sixteen-year-old boy brought to the hospital's emergency room. When another pair of sheriff's deputies arrived, video shows one of the deputies hitting the boy, now handcuffed, in the face twice as the boy spit blood pooling in his mouth after being tackled from behind by security guards. The deputy then aggressively approached the mother, yelling at her before being pulled to the ground by a second deputy, In an interview with WBTV, Lincoln County Sheriff Bill Beam defended his deputies saying they did nothing wrong, denying that the officer struck the boy or that the officer was physically restrained by two additional sheriff's deputies. The boy was arrested and charged with felony assault on a police officer.

== Education ==
=== Post-secondary education ===
- Gaston College - Community College located in Dallas, North Carolina with a satellite campus in Lincolnton offering associate degree, Certificate, and Diploma programs.

=== Lincoln County Schools ===
There is one school district in the county: Lincoln County Schools.

Comprehensive high schools

- East Lincoln High School
- Lincolnton High School
- North Lincoln High School
- West Lincoln High School

Charter schools

- Lincoln Charter School

Former Schools

- Newbold High School (1952-1968), a segregated school that served African Americans and became G. E. Massey Elementary School in 1968 after desegregation
- Oaklawn High School (segregated school serving African Americans), replaced by Newbold High School in 1952

== Communities ==
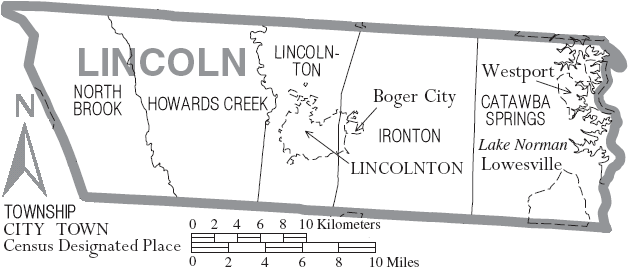
Map of Lincoln County with municipal and township labels

=== City ===
- Lincolnton (county seat and largest community)

=== Town ===
- Boger City (former town)
- Maiden (part)

=== Census-designated places ===
- Crouse
- Denver
- Iron Station
- Lowesville
- Westport

=== Unincorporated communities ===
- Flay
- Laboratory
- Laurel Hill
- Polkadot
- Reepsville
- Toluca (part)
- Vale

=== Townships ===
- Catawba Springs
- Howards Creek
- Ironton
- Lincolnton
- North Brook

== See also ==
- List of counties in North Carolina
- National Register of Historic Places listings in Lincoln County, North Carolina
- Lincoln Theatre Guild
