= 2021 Senior Bowl =

American college football all-star game

2021 Reese's Senior Bowl
- 72nd Senior Bowl
National Team	American Team
27	24
Head coach: Brian Flores (Miami Dolphins)	Head coach: Matt Rhule (Carolina Panthers)
	1	2	3	4	Total
National	10	3	7	7	27
American	0	0	16	8	24
- Date: January 30, 2021
- Season: 2020
- Stadium: Hancock Whitney Stadium
- Location: Mobile, Alabama
- MVP: Kellen Mond (QB, American)
- Referee: James Carter (SEC, 1st half) & Bryan Banks (Big Ten, 2nd half)
- Attendance: 6,714

United States TV coverage
- Network: NFL Network
- Announcers: Andrew Siciliano (play-by-play) and Daniel Jeremiah (color)

The 2021 Senior Bowl was a college football all-star game played on January 30, 2021, at 1:30 p.m. CST, at Hancock Whitney Stadium in Mobile, Alabama. The game featured prospects for the 2021 draft of the professional National Football League (NFL), predominantly from the NCAA Division I Football Bowl Subdivision (FBS), rostered into "National" and "American" teams. (Note: Previously, the Senior Bowl had rostered players into North and South teams.) It was one of the final 2020–21 bowl games concluding the 2020 FBS football season. Sponsored by Reese's Peanut Butter Cups, the game was officially known as the Reese's Senior Bowl, with television coverage provided by NFL Network.

On January 11, 2021, bowl organizers announced that the teams would be coached by personnel from the Miami Dolphins and Carolina Panthers, coaching the National team and American team, respectively. This was the first Senior Bowl to be played at Hancock Whitney Stadium, after the 1951–2020 editions were held at Ladd–Peebles Stadium, also in Mobile.

== Players ==
Organizers maintained a "watch list" of 250 players as potential invitees. In October 2020, the first invitation was issued to Dillon Radunz, an offensive tackle at North Dakota State of the Football Championship Subdivision (FCS). On January 18, Heisman Trophy winner DeVonta Smith accepted an invitation to the game, but did not play.

Players listed below are all from the NCAA Division I Football Bowl Subdivision (FBS), unless noted otherwise after their college team. A week before the game, the bowl's executive director noted that there were 136 players on-site. In the final week before the game, several players who had accepted invites were replaced on the roster due to injury or other circumstances. Quarterback Kyle Trask was a notable player replaced due to injury.

=== National team ===
Full roster online here. Numerical rosters here (a number may be shared by an offensive and defensive player).

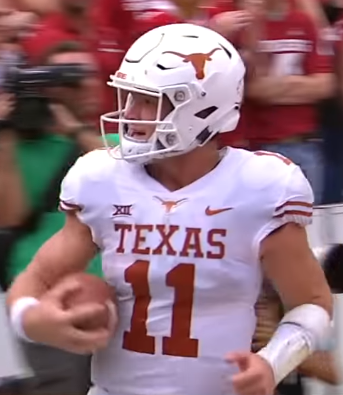
QB Sam Ehlinger

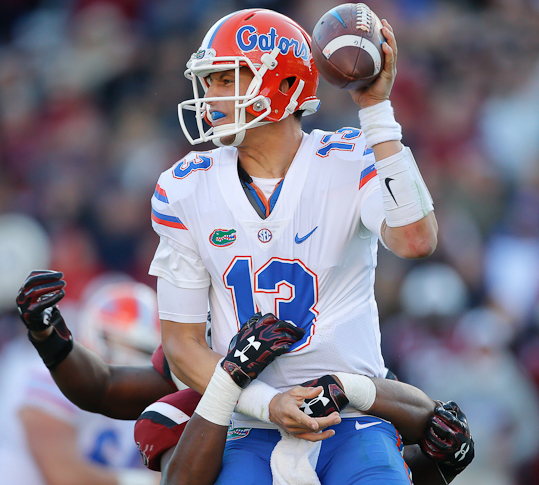
QB Feleipe Franks

No.	Player	Position	HT/WT	College	Notes
73	Aaron Banks	OL	6'5/338	Notre Dame	
19	Derrick Barnes	LB	6'0/245	Purdue	3 tackles (1 solo)
87	John Bates	TE	6'5/259	Boise State	1 reception, 13 yards
12	Ian Book	QB	6'0/210	Notre Dame	5/11, 48 yards; 1 INT; 4 carries, 18 yards
32	Tuf Borland	LB	6'0/229	Ohio State	2 tackles (0 solo)
76	Spencer Brown	OL	6'8/314	Northern Iowa (FCS)	
22	Tre Brown	DB	5'9/188	Oklahoma	
55	Baron Browning	LB	6'3/241	Ohio State	3 tackles (1 solo)
24	Camryn Bynum	DB	6'0/198	California	5 tackles (4 solo)
7	Michael Carter	RB	5'7/202	North Carolina	8 carries, 60 yards; 1 TD; 2 receptions, 15 yards
94	Camaron Cheeseman	LS	6'4/237	Michigan	
4	Nico Collins	WR	6'4/215	Michigan	did not play
0	Jonathon Cooper	DL	6'2/254	Ohio State	2 tackles (1 solo); 1/2 sack
77	Jake Curhan	OL	6'5/323	California	
84	Frank Darby	WR	6'0/194	Arizona State	1 reception, 22 yards
27	Divine Deablo	DB	6'3/226	Virginia Tech	6 tackles (5 solo)
79	Adrian Ealy	OL	6'6/326	Oklahoma	
11	Sam Ehlinger	QB	6'1/222	Texas	4/10, 42 yards; 1 TD
1	D'Wayne Eskridge	WR	5'9/188	Western Michigan	did not play
10	Demetric Felton	RB	5'8/189	UCLA	2 receptions, 28 yards; 1 TD; 1 PR, 10 yards
30	Tony Fields II	LB	6'1/222	West Virginia	
13	Dez Fitzpatrick	WR	6'2/202	Louisville	6 receptions, 90 yards; Offensive Player of the Game
8	Feleipe Franks	QB	6'6/234	Arkansas	9/16, 122 yards; 1 TD
49	Ta'Quon Graham	DL	6'3/290	Texas	2 tackles (2 solo); 1 sack
4	Thomas Graham Jr.	DB	5'10/193	Oregon	3 tackles (2 solo)
72	Robert Hainsey	OL	6'4/302	Notre Dame	
23	Darren Hall	DB	5'11/189	San Diego State	3 tackles (1 solo)
33	Damar Hamlin	DB	6'0/201	Pittsburgh	2 tackles (1 solo); 1 INT
22	Najee Harris	RB	6'1/230	Alabama	did not play
9	Daelin Hayes	DL	6'3/261	Notre Dame	3 tackles (0 solo); 1/2 sack
25	Khalil Herbert	RB	5'8/204	Virginia Tech	6 carries, 3 yards; 2 receptions, 2 yards; 1 PR, 3 yards
6	Justin Hilliard	LB	6'0/227	Ohio State	4 tackles (0 solo)
55	James Hudson	OL	6'4/302	Cincinnati	
56	Creed Humphrey	OL	6'4/312	Oklahoma	
99	Tarron Jackson	DL	6'2/260	Coastal Carolina	2 tackles (1 solo)
67	Brenden Jaimes	OL	6'5/300	Nebraska	
83	Cade Johnson	WR	5'10/186	South Dakota State (FCS)	1 reception, 10 yards
90	Patrick Jones II	DL	6'4/264	Pittsburgh	1 tackle (1 solo); 1 sack
70	Robert Jones	OL	6'4/319	Middle Tennessee	
80	Hunter Long	TE	6'5/254	Boston College	did not play
42	Ben Mason	FB	6'2/256	Michigan	did not play
71	Quinn Meinerz	OL	6'3/320	Wisconsin–Whitewater (DIII)	
74	Jaylon Moore	OL	6'4/311	Western Michigan	
5	Tre Norwood	DB	5'11/192	Oklahoma	0 tackles (0 solo)
92	Osa Odighizuwa	DL	6'2/280	UCLA	2 tackles (1 solo); 1/2 sack
91	Adetokunbo Ogundeji	DL	6'4/256	Notre Dame	2 tackles (1 solo); 1/2 sack
95	Levi Onwuzurike	DL	6'2/290	Washington	
30	Riley Patterson	K	5'10/183	Memphis	2-for-2 FG, long 36; 3-for-3 PAT
75	Dillon Radunz	OL	6'5/304	North Dakota State (FCS)	
11	Hamilcar Rashed Jr.	LB	6'3/254	Oregon State	2 tackles (1 solo)
25	Benjamin St-Juste	DB	6'3/200	Minnesota	1 tackle (1 solo)
5	Trey Sermon	RB	6'0/213	Ohio State	did not play
81	Ben Skowronek	WR	6'2/211	Notre Dame	did not play
0	DeVonta Smith	WR	N/A	Alabama	did not play
47	Elerson Smith	DL	6'6/262	Northern Iowa (FCS)	2 tackles (2 solo)
38	James Smith	P	6'4/233	Cincinnati	4 punts, 148 yards, long 52
29	Rhamondre Stevenson	RB	5'11/227	Oklahoma	7 carries, 9 yards; 1 reception, 5 yards
50	Chazz Surratt	LB	6'1/227	North Carolina	
16	Sage Surratt	WR	6'2/215	Wake Forest	did not play
8	Keith Taylor Jr.	DB	6'2/191	Washington	2 tackles (1 solo)
1	Ambry Thomas	DB	5'11/189	Michigan	1 tackle (0 solo)
18	Shaka Toney	EDGE	6'2/238	Penn State	2 tackles (1 solo)
29	Christian Uphoff	DB	6'2/213	Illinois State (FCS)	3 tackles (2 solo)
2	Tylan Wallace	WR	5'11/193	Oklahoma State	did not play
17	Rashad Weaver	DL	6'4/265	Pittsburgh	2 tackles (0 solo)
--	Rodarius Williams	DB	6'0/193	Oklahoma State	
88	Kenny Yeboah	TE	6'3/247	Ole Miss	2 receptions, 27 yards; 1 TD

Chazz Surratt and Sage Surratt are brothers.

=== American team ===
Full roster online here. Numerical rosters here (a number may be shared by an offensive and defensive player).

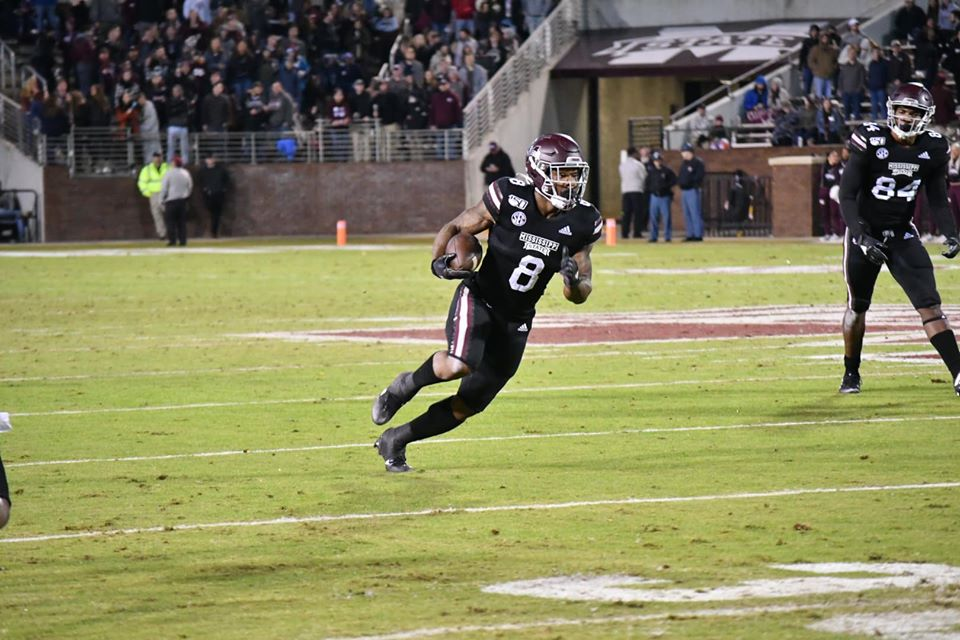
RB Kylin Hill

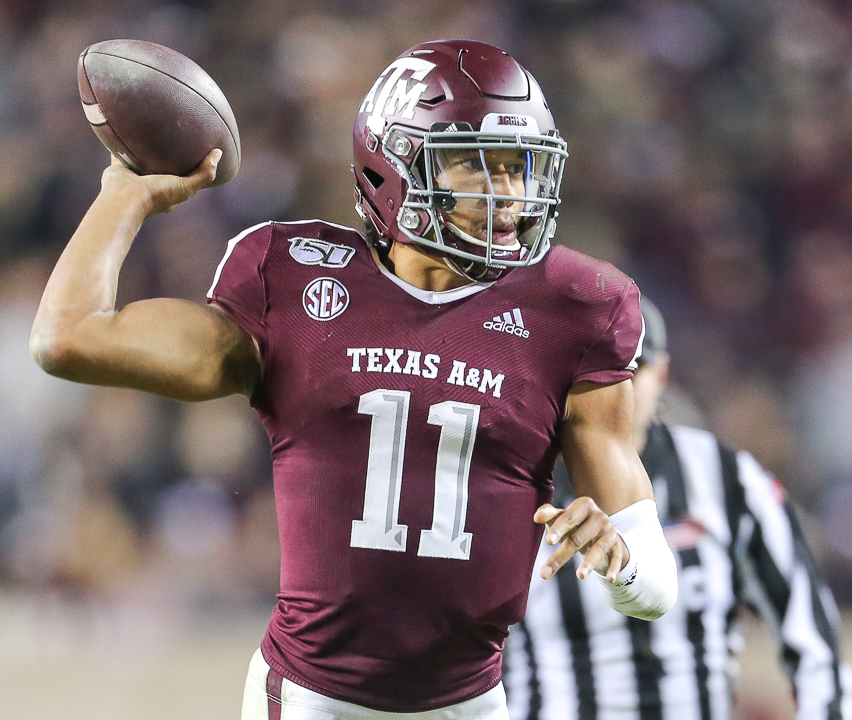
QB Kellen Mond

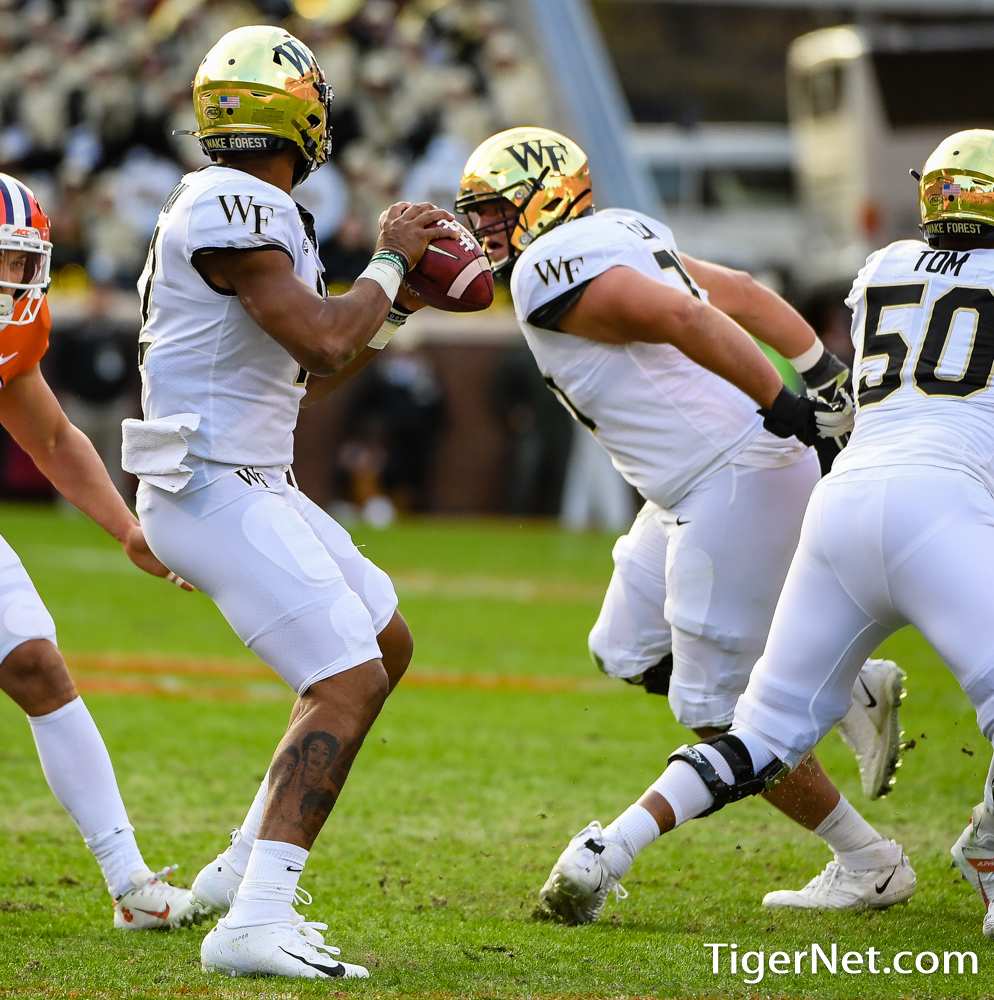
QB Jamie Newman

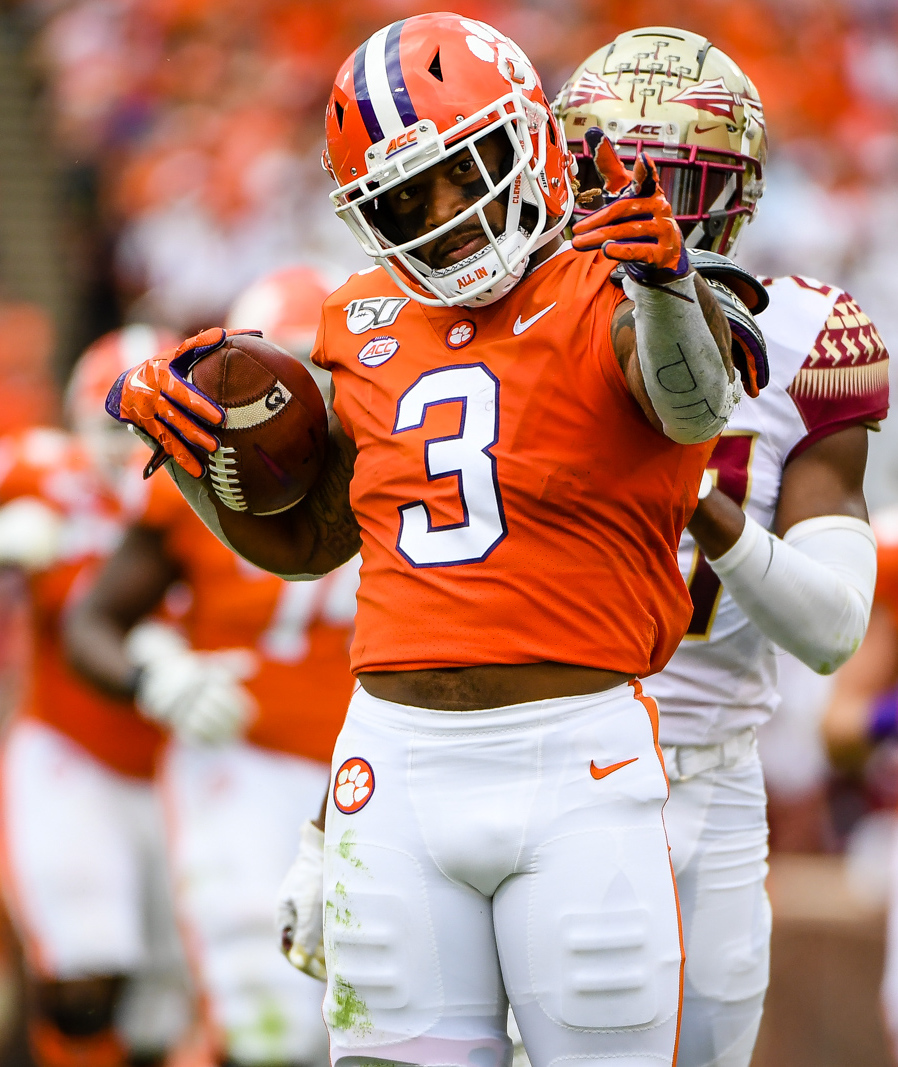
WR Amari Rodgers

No.	Player	Position	HT/WT	College	Notes
56	Jack Anderson	OL	6'4/309	Texas Tech	
9	Carlos Basham Jr.	DL	6'3/281	Wake Forest	
1	Joshuah Bledsoe	DB	5'11/201	Missouri	1 tackle (1 solo)
30	José Borregales	K	5'9/207	Miami, Florida	no kicking attempts
99	William Bradley-King	EDGE	6'3/254	Baylor	
33	K. J. Britt	LB	6'0/239	Auburn	5 tackles (2 solo)
65	Deonte Brown	OL	6'3/364	Alabama	
74	Ben Cleveland	OL	6'6/354	Georgia	
44	Riley Cole	LB	6'2/242	South Alabama	6 tackles (2 solo)
19	Jabril Cox	LB	6'2/233	LSU	5 tackles (1 solo)
14	D. J. Daniel	DB	5'11/183	Georgia	1 tackle (1 solo)
6	Shawn Davis	DB	5'10/199	Florida	1 INT
69	Landon Dickerson	OL	6'6/326	Alabama	
93	Max Duffy	P	6'0/197	Kentucky	4 punts, 156 yards, long 44
9	Chris Evans	RB	5'10/219	Michigan	did not play
30	Paddy Fisher	LB	6'3/239	Northwestern	1 tackle (1 solo)
45	Thomas Fletcher	LS	6'1/237	Alabama	
3	Tyree Gillespie	DB	5'11/207	Missouri	
90	Chauncey Golston	DL	6'4/268	Iowa	6 tackles (1 solo)
83	Kylen Granson	TE	6'2/242	SMU	1 reception, 8 yards
27	Richie Grant	DB	5'11/200	UCF	
86	Noah Gray	TE	6'3/240	Duke	did not play
55	Carson Green	OL	6'6/319	Texas A&M	
8	Trevon Grimes	WR	6'3/217	Florida	2 receptions, 33 yards; 1 TD
10	Malik Herring	DL	6'3/283	Georgia	
20	Kylin Hill	RB	5'10/214	Mississippi State	6 carries, 15 yards; 2-point conversion rush
56	Wyatt Hubert	DE	6'2/265	Kansas State	
78	Alaric Jackson	OL	6'5/318	Iowa	
76	Drake Jackson	OL	6'1/290	Kentucky	
10	Mac Jones	QB	6'2/217	Alabama	did not play
35	Ryan Langan	LS	6'1/228	Georgia Southern	1 tackle (1 solo)
70	Alex Leatherwood	OL	6'5/312	Alabama	
87	Tre' McKitty	TE	6'4/247	Georgia	1 reception, 14 yards
17	Racey McMath	WR	6'2/224	LSU	did not play
8	Ifeatu Melifonwu	DB	6'2/212	Syracuse	3 tackles (2 solo)
12	Bryan Mills	DB	6'0/180	North Carolina Central (FCS)	4 tackles (4 solo)
15	Elijah Mitchell	RB	5'10/215	Louisiana	4 carries, 2 yards; 2 receptions, 10 yards
12	Kellen Mond	QB	6'2/205	Texas A&M	13/25, 173 yards; 2 TD, 2-point conversion pass; 2 carries, 11 yards, 2-point conversion rush; Most Valuable Player
68	Dan Moore Jr.	OL	6'5/309	Texas A&M	
60	David Moore	OL	6'1/350	Grambling State (FCS)	
81	Quintin Morris	TE	6'2/NA	Bowling Green	3 receptions, 52 yards
25	Hamsah Nasirildeen	DB	6'3/213	Florida State	3 tackles (0 solo)
7	Jamie Newman	QB	6'2/235	Wake Forest	10/14, 118 yards; 1 TD, 1 INT; 3 carries 0 yards
72	Royce Newman	OL	6'5/306	Ole Miss	
85	Josh Palmer	WR	6'1/210	Tennessee	2 receptions, 27 yards; 1 TD
14	Cornell Powell	WR	6'0/205	Clemson	2 receptions, 42 yards
32	Monty Rice	LB	6'0/238	Georgia	
31	Aaron Robinson	DB	5'11/190	UCF	
96	Janarius Robinson	EDGE	6'5/266	Florida State	5 tackles (1 solo); 1 1/2 sacks
55	Quincy Roche	EDGE	6'2/243	Miami, Florida	2 tackles (0 solo)
23	Robert Rochell	DB	5'11/195	Central Arkansas (FCS)	
3	Amari Rodgers	WR	5'9/211	Clemson	4 receptions, 23 yards; 1 TD; 1 carry, -4 yards; 1 PR, 11 yards; 2-point conversion catch
34	Larry Rountree III	RB	5'10/216	Missouri	4 carries, 7 yards; 2 receptions, 19 yards
5	Cameron Sample	DL	6'2/274	Tulane	7 tackles (2 solo); 1/2 sack; Defensive Player of the Game
67	D'Ante Smith	OL	6'5/294	East Carolina	
22	Jordan Smith	LB	6'6/255	UAB	3 tackles (2 solo)
13	Shi Smith	WR	5'10/186	South Carolina	3 receptions, 57 yards
73	Trey Smith	OL	6'5/331	Tennessee	
11	Charles Snowden	LB	6'6/232	Virginia	
7	JaCoby Stevens	DB	6'1/216	LSU	
5	Marquez Stevenson	WR	5'10/182	Houston	1 reception, 6 yards; 1 PR, 9 yards
0	Grant Stuard	LB	5'11/230	Houston	2 tackles (0 solo)
1	Kadarius Toney	WR	5'11/189	Florida	did not play
95	Marlon Tuipulotu	DL	6'1/308	USC	
98	Payton Turner	DL	6'5/270	Houston	
6	Austin Watkins Jr.	WR	6'1/207	UAB	did not play
26	Mark Webb	DB	6'1/210	Georgia	5 tackles (3 solo)
21	Marvin Wilson	DL	6'3/319	Florida State	

== Game summary ==
Note special playing rules detailed here. Players in the game were each issued two helmet stickers; one with the player's hometown area code, and one with number 44 for Hank Aaron, who was born in Mobile and died on January 22.

2021 Reese's Senior Bowl

Quarter	1	2	3	4	Total
National	10	3	7	7	27
American	0	0	16	8	24

at Hancock Whitney Stadium • Mobile, Alabama

- Date: Saturday, January 30, 2021
- Game time: 2:30 p.m. EST (1:30 p.m. CST)
- Game weather: Partly cloudy • Temperature: 65 °F (18 °C)
- Game attendance: 6,714
- Referee: James Carter (SEC, 1st half) & Bryan Banks (Big Ten, 2nd half)
- TV: NFL Network
- ESPN game summary, statbroadcast.com

Game information

First quarter

- (8:32) NATL — Riley Patterson 36-yard field goal (Drive: 9 plays, 53 yards, 3:12; National 3–0)
- (4:47) NATL — Sam Ehlinger 12-yard pass to Demetric Felton, Riley Patterson kick (Drive: 2 plays, 52 yards, 0:45; National 10–0)

Second quarter

- (5:02) NATL — Riley Patterson 32-yard field goal (Drive: 8 plays, 24 yards, 4:05; National 13–0)

Third quarter

- (9:44) AMER — Kellen Mond 15-yard pass to Amari Rodgers; 2-point conversion rush by Mond (Drive: 8 plays, 58 yards, 3:21; National 13–8)
- (4:52) AMER — Kellen Mond 14-yard pass to Josh Palmer; 2-point conversion pass, Mond to Rodgers (Drive: 4 plays, 42 yards, 2:29; American 16–13)
- (9:44) NATL — Michael Carter 12-yard rush, Riley Patterson kick (Drive: 12 plays, 75 yards, 4:08; National 20–16)

Fourth quarter

- (11:57) NATL — Feleipe Franks 21-yard pass to Kenny Yeboah, Riley Patterson kick (Drive: 4 plays, 57 yards, 2:01; National 27–16)
- (0:49) AMER — Jamie Newman 10-yard pass to Trevon Grimes, 2-point conversion rush by Kylin Hill (Drive: 6 plays, 65 yards, 1:54; National 27–24)

=== Statistics ===
Statistics	NATL	AMER
First downs	17	16
Plays–yards	64–288	59–301
Rushes–yards	27–88	20–31
Passing yards	200	270
Passing: comp–att–int	18–37–1	23–39–1
Turnovers		
Time of possession	29:41	30:19

Team	Category	Player	Statistics
National	Passing	Feleipe Franks	9-for-19, 122 yards, 1 TD
National	Rushing	Michael Carter	60 yards on 8 carries, 1 TD
National	Receiving	Dez Fitzpatrick	90 yards on 6 receptions
American	Passing	Kellen Mond	13-for-25, 173 yards, 2 TD
American	Rushing	Kylin Hill	15 yards on 6 carries
American	Receiving	Shi Smith	57 yards on 3 receptions
