= Lincoln County Schools (North Carolina) =

School district in North Carolina, United States

Location
- Lincoln County, North Carolina United States
- Coordinates: 35°29′12″N 81°14′41″W

District information
- Grades: PK-12
- Superintendent: Aaron Allen
- Schools: #Schools
- NCES District ID: 3702680

Students and staff
- Students: 11,710 (2024-2025)
- Teachers: 767.45 (on an FTE basis)
- Staff: 805.13 (on an FTE basis)
- Student–teacher ratio: 15.26

Other information
- Website: www.lincoln.k12.nc.us

Lincoln County Schools is the school district that presides over all of Lincoln County, North Carolina and serves 11,710 students.

== History ==
Lincoln County Schools started out as rural schools throughout the county. Throughout the 19th century, refinements in the North Carolina Constitution allowed the public school system to start. Lincoln County Schools began to function as a government body in the late 19th and early 20th centuries, officially being founded on July 20, 1885. Between 1915– 1927, L. Berge Beam led a giant construction and consolidation program to unify the county under one school district. This plan included closure of neighborhood schools, replacing them with newer schools that had higher teaching standards and improved facilities. It also included a transportation route with a newly acquired bus fleet to prevent students from dropping out after the fifth and sixth grades. For the next few decades after L. Berge Beam's leadership, the school district experienced growth. Between 1950–1968, North Carolina and Lincoln County Schools underwent desegregation. This process faced much delay to be implemented fully. In 1968, Newbold High School, a black high school that opened in 1952 to separate black students from white students, closed after the Department of Health, Education, and Welfare would cut off funding for the county's school district if not closed. Therefore, a plan was formed to phase out the school and any remaining schools that were racially segregated. The school was refurbished as G.E. Massey Elementary School. After the 1960s, Lincoln County Schools saw more growth as the district was given $2.7 million to construct new high schools in 1972. Lincoln County Schools experienced an increased growth of students which caused North Lincoln High School to open in 2003.

== Governance ==
Lincoln County Schools is governed in a council-manager fashion. The Board of Education appoints a superintendent to carry out district operations on a daily basis. Each Board of Education member is elected for four years. The current Board of Education members are Christina Sutton as Chair, Krista Heavner as Vice-Chair, Tony Jenkins, Jennifer Raimey, Erin Long, Kevin Sanders, and Brandi Wyant. The current superintendent is Dr. Aaron Allen.

== Schools ==
- East Lincoln High School
  - East Lincoln Middle School
  - Catawba Springs Elementary
  - St. James Elementary
  - Iron Station Elementary
- North Lincoln High School
  - North Lincoln Middle School
  - Pumpkin Center Primary School
  - Pumpkin Center Intermediate School
  - Rock Springs Elementary
- Lincolnton High School
  - Lincolnton Middle School
  - Battleground Elementary School
  - Kiser Intermediate School
  - G.E. Massey Elementary School
  - S. Ray Lowder Elementary School
- West Lincoln High School
  - West Lincoln Middle School
  - Union Elementary School
  - Norris S. Childers Elementary School
  - North Brook Elementary School
  - Love Memorial Elementary School
- Asbury Academy
