= Gunfighter Paradise =

Film by Jethro Waters

- Release poster
- Directed by: Jethro Waters
- Written by: Jethro Waters
- Produced by: Nancy Buirski; Sara Ayele; Kyle Lewis; Jethro Waters
- Starring: Jessica Hecht; Valient Himself; Braz Cubas; Joel Loftin; Burk Uzzle
- Cinematography: Jethro Waters
- Edited by: Jethro Waters
- Music by: Jethro Waters; Bryan Black
- Production company: Waters Film
- Release dates: March 2024 (MidWest WeirdFest); February 27, 2026 (United States, AMC Theaters)
- Running time: 93 minutes
- Country: United States
- Language: English

Gunfighter Paradise is a 2024 American dark comedy horror film written and directed by Jethro Waters. It stars Jessica Hecht, Valient Himself of Valient Thorr, Burk Uzzle, Braz Cubas, and Joel Loftin.

Gunfighter Paradise is an example of auteur film, having been written, directed, produced, shot, edited, and scored by Jethro Waters. The film has been noted as a dark comedy that explores themes of religion, violence, The American South, grief, and family in America. Critics have referred to the film as surrealist and experimental as well as sardonic and satirical. Multiple critics have also noted the film's pithy dialogue and unique blocking and cinematography. The film has been compared to the work of the Coen Brothers and David Lynch, as well as Luis Buñuel.

Iconic Italian poster artist Renato Casaro painted the movie poster for Gunfighter Paradise.

== Plot ==
Gunfighter Paradise follows a camouflaged hunter (Cubas) as he returns home to North Carolina with a mysterious green case. Following the death of his mother (Hecht), he moves into the old family home where he is haunted by the voices of God, hallucinogenic visions, and many strange visitors, including Civil War Reenactors, a cable man, zealous Christian neighbors, and an assassin.

== Cast ==
- Jessica Hecht as The Mother
- Valient Himself as The Brother
- Braz Cubas as Stoner
- Joel Loftin as Joel
- Burk Uzzle as Uncle Dean

== Release ==
Gunfighter Parardise officially released in theaters on February 27, 2026 at AMC Theaters in New York City. The film screened in film festivals beginning March 9, 2024, in competition at the Midwest WeirdFest Film Festival in Eau Claire, Wisconsin where it won the Best Film prize. It subsequently screened at RiverRun International Film Festival and FilmFest Bremen in Bremen, Germany.
