= Nathan Carter Newbold =

American educator (1871-1957)

Nathan Carter Newbold (December 27, 1871 – December 23, 1957) was the Director of Negro Education in the North Carolina State Department of Public Instruction from 1921 to 1950. Newbold advocated for increased educational opportunities for African-American children in North Carolina within a racially segregated school system.

== Biography ==
Nathan Carter Newbold was born in Pasquotank County, North Carolina near Elizabeth City. He was a school teacher and principal in Eastern North Carolina. Newbold then served as superintendent of schools in Asheboro, Roxboro, and Washington County. In 1913, Newbold moved to Raleigh to serve as the state's first agent for Negro Education. In this role, Newbold advocated for increased educational opportunity for African-American children in North Carolina. In 1920, Newbold proposed a Division of Negro Education to the State Board of Education. The plan was approved in 1921 and $15,000 was allocated by the General Assembly for the new division. In 1921, Newbold became the first Division Director of the Division of Negro Education. Newbold served as Director of Negro Education until he retired in 1950. Newbold died in Raleigh, North Carolina at his home at the age of 85 on December 23, 1957.

== Works ==
He edited Five North Carolina Negro Educators published in 1939, which included chapters on educators Simon Green Atkins, James Benson Dudley, Annie Wealthy Holland, Peter Weddick Moore, and Ezekiel Ezra Smith.

== Legacy ==
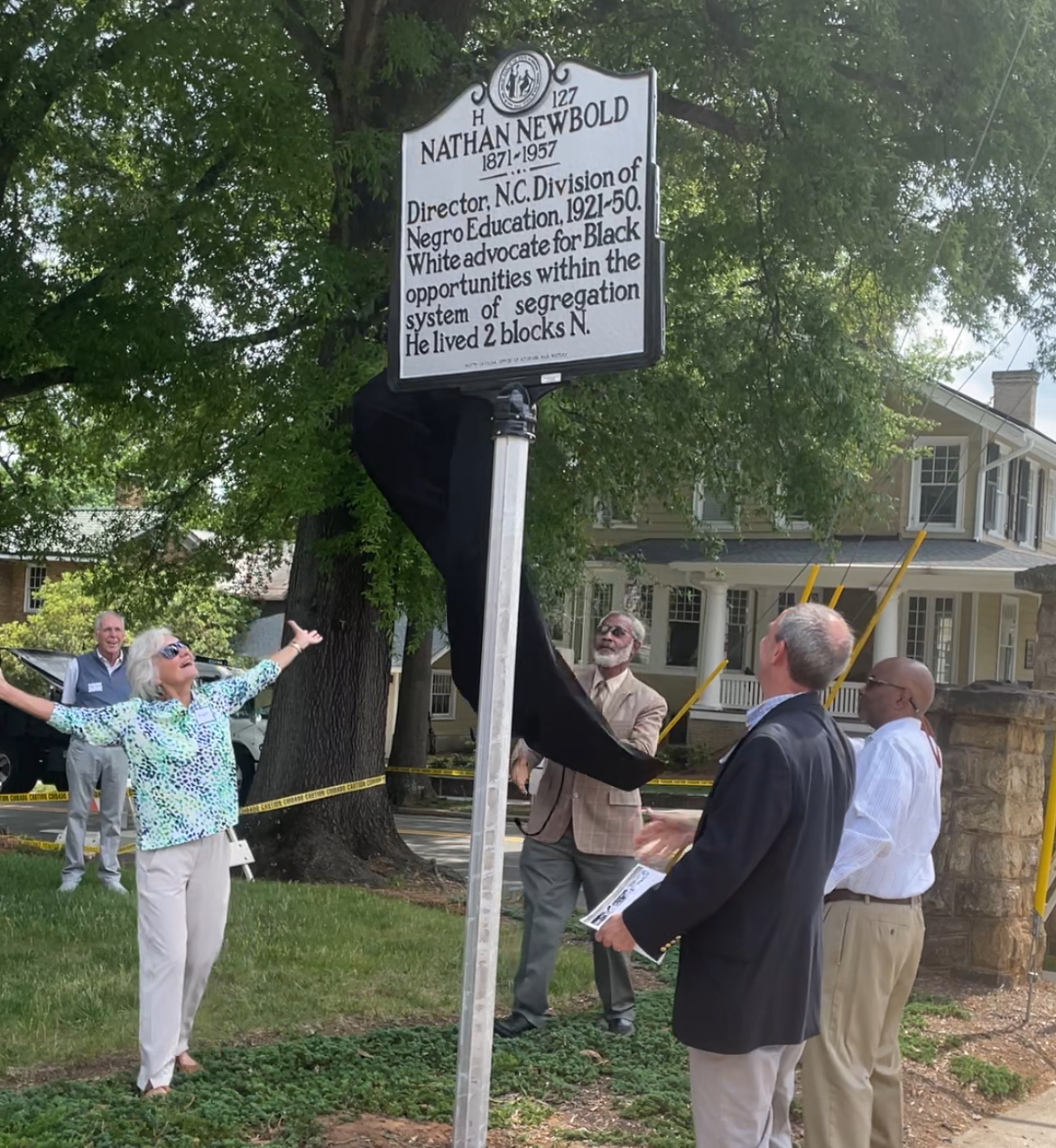
The unveiling of the historic marker commemorating Nathan Carter Newbold

Newbold High School was named in honor of Nathan Carter Newbold in 1952. The segregated high school served African-Americans until it closed in 1968 during desegregation. The school now serves as G. E. Massey Elementary School.

On April 25, 2025, a North Carolina Highway Historical Marker was dedicated for Nathan Carter Newbold. The marker stands at the corner of Hillsborough Street and West Park Drive, two blocks south of Newbold's former residence in Raleigh, North Carolina.

Barry F. Malone wrote a dissertation on him and education in Jim Crow era North Carolina.

The North Carolina Digital Collections have some of his correspondence available online. North Carolina Central University has a collection of his and his family's papers. Duke University has a collection of his papers.

== See also ==
- Simon Green Atkins
- James Benson Dudley
- Annie Wealthy Holland
- Peter Weddick Moore
- Ezekiel Ezra Smith
