= Dennis Byrd (American football, born 1946) =

American football player (1946–2010)

No. 78
- Position: Defensive end

Personal information
- Born: August 31, 1946; Pleasant Garden, North Carolina, U.S.
- Died: July 22, 2010 (aged 63); Charlotte, North Carolina, U.S.
- Listed height: 6 ft 4 in (1.93 m)
- Listed weight: 260 lb (118 kg)

Career information
- High school: Lincolnton (Lincolnton, North Carolina)
- College: NC State (1964–1967)
- NFL draft: 1968: 1st round, 6th overall pick

Career history
- Boston Patriots (1968)

Awards and highlights
- Consensus All-American (1967); First-team All-American (1966); 3× First-team All-ACC (1965–1967); ACC 50th Anniversary Team; NC State Wolfpack No. 77 retired

Career AFL statistics
- Games played: 14
- Games started: 14
- Sacks: 3.5
- Stats at Pro Football Reference
- College Football Hall of Fame

Dennis Wayne Byrd (August 31, 1946 – July 22, 2010) was an American professional football defensive end who played in the American Football League (AFL) one season for the Boston Patriots. He played college football for the NC State Wolfpack, where he was named first-team All-ACC in each of his three years of varsity competition and was a consensus All-American as a senior in 1967. He is regarded as one of the most dominant defensive tackles in the Atlantic Coast Conference history.

== College career ==
Byrd made several first-team All-American lists as a junior in 1966 and was a consensus All-American in 1967 as a senior. He was the first player from NC State to receive that honor and was the first three-time All-ACC player in conference history.

== Professional career ==
Byrd was drafted sixth overall in the first round of the 1968 NFL/AFL draft by the Boston Patriots. Byrd started all 14 games for the 1968 Patriots team, but he was never able to fully recover from a knee injury he suffered in his senior year at NC State and only played one year of professional football.

== Coaching career ==
After leaving the NFL, Byrd became the high school football coach at West Lincoln High School in Lincolnton, North Carolina, and later was an assistant high school football coach at Northeastern High School in Elizabeth City, North Carolina. He retired from teaching and coaching in 2004.

== Honors ==
In 2001, Byrd became the first defensive player at NC State to have his jersey number (77) retired.

He was selected to the ACC 50th Anniversary Football Team in 2003.

Byrd was inducted into the North Carolina Sports Hall of Fame in 2007, the College Football Hall of Fame in 2010, and the NC State Athletic Hall of Fame in 2014.
