= Lincoln Theatre =

Lincoln Theatre may refer to:

In the United States

- Lincoln Theater (Los Angeles, California), listed on the National Register of Historic Places (NRHP)
- Lincoln Theater (Yountville, California)
- Lincoln Theatre (New Haven, Connecticut), NRHP-listed
- Lincoln Theatre (Washington, D.C.), NRHP-listed
- Lincoln Theatre (Miami Beach, Florida)
- Lincoln Theatre (Decatur, Illinois), mentioned in an episode of Most Terrifying Places in America
- Lincoln Theater (Baton Rouge, Louisiana), NRHP-listed in East Baton Rouge Parish
- Lincoln Theatre (Harlem), New York City, New York
- Lincoln Theatre Guild, Lincoln County, North Carolina
- Lincoln Theatre (Raleigh, North Carolina), a music venue in Raleigh, North Carolina
- Lincoln Theatre (Columbus, Ohio), NRHP-listed
- Lincoln Theatre (Philadelphia), originally the Dunbar Theatre, a 1920s–1940s jazz club in Philadelphia, Pennsylvania
- Lincoln Theatre (Marion, Virginia), NRHP-listed
- Lincoln Theatre (Mount Vernon, Washington), NRHP-listed
- Lincoln Theater (Charleston, North Carolina), a theater managed by Ireland Thomas
