= Jason Saine =

American politician

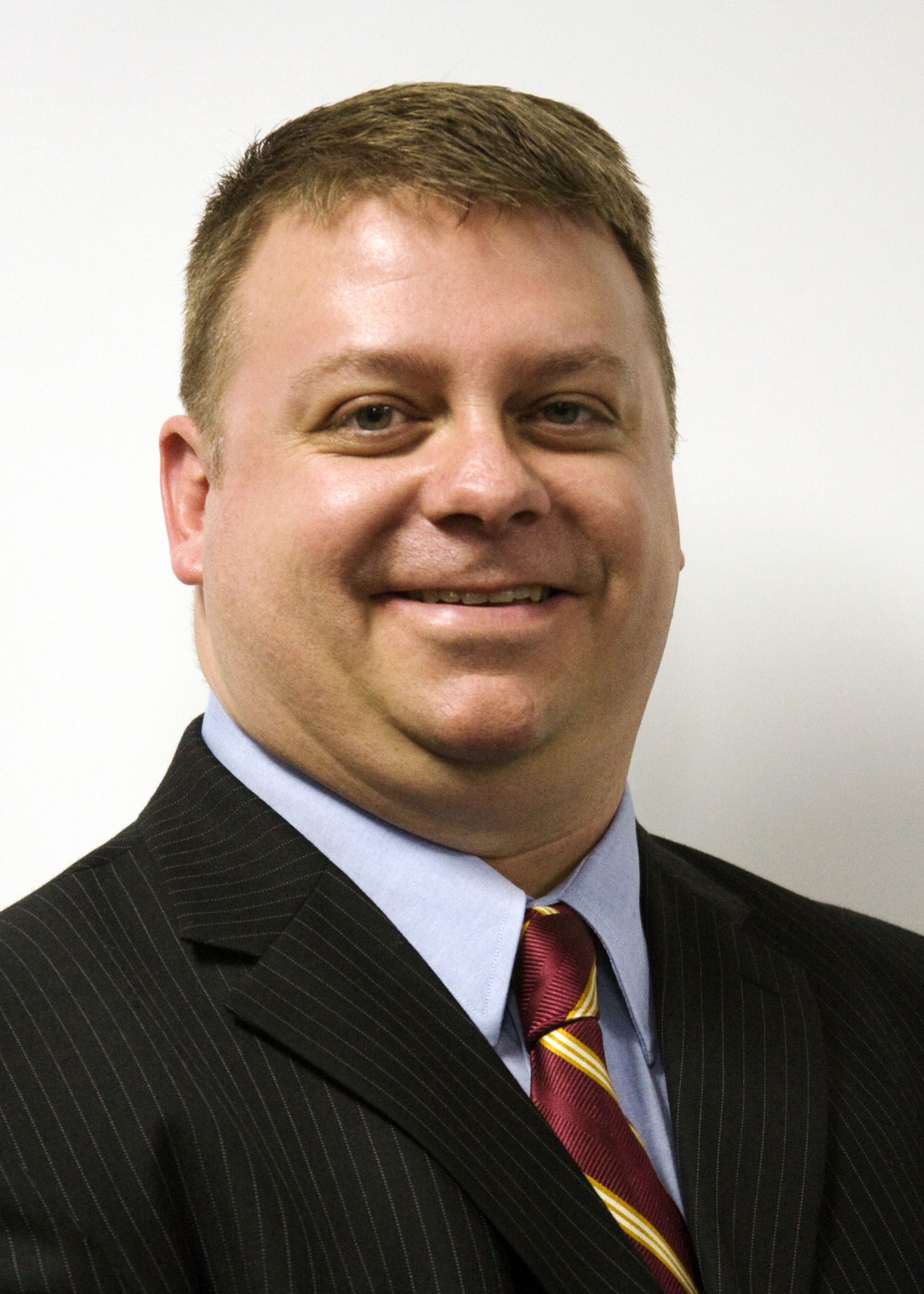

Member of the North Carolina House of Representatives from the 97th district
- In office August 24, 2011 – August 12, 2024
- Preceded by: Jonathan Rhyne
- Succeeded by: Heather Rhyne

Personal details
- Born: Jason Ray Saine
- Party: Republican
- Spouse: Kathryn
- Children: 1
- Education: University of North Carolina, Charlotte (BA); North Carolina State University; Columbia Southern University (BS)
- Website: State House website

Jason Ray Saine is a former Republican member of the North Carolina House of Representatives, having represented the 97th district (based in Lincoln County) from 2011 to 2024. A public relations and social media manager from Lincolnton he was re-elected to the seat in 2012, 2014, 2016, 2018, and 2020. He resigned from the North Carolina House in August 2024.

== Committee assignments ==
=== 2023–2024 session ===
- Appropriations (Senior Chair)
- Appropriations - Information Technology (Vice Chair)
- Commerce
- Energy and Public Utilities
- Ethics
- Judiciary I
- Redistricting (Vice Chair)
- Rules, Calendar, and Operations

=== 2021–2022 session ===
- Appropriations (Senior Chair)
- Appropriations - Information Technology
- Energy and Public Utilities
- Ethics
- Judiciary I
- Redistricting (Vice Chair)
- Rules, Calendar, and Operations
- Alcoholic Beverage Control

=== 2019–2020 session ===
- Appropriations (Senior Chair)
- Appropriations - Information Technology
- Energy and Public Utilities
- Ethics
- Redistricting
- Rules, Calendar, and Operations
- Alcoholic Beverage Control

=== 2017–2018 session ===
- Appropriations (Vice Chair)
- Appropriations - Information Technology
- Rules, Calendar, and Operations
- Finance (Chair)
- Education (K-12)
- Alcoholic Beverage Control

=== 2015–2016 session ===
- Appropriations (Vice Chair)
- Appropriations - Information Technology (Chair)
- Rules, Calendar, and Operations
- Finance (Senior Chair)
- Elections
- Health
- Judiciary II
- Commerce and Job Development
- Alcoholic Beverage Control

=== 2013–2014 session ===
- Appropriations (Vice Chair)
- Rules, Calendar, and Operations
- Education
- Elections
- Judiciary
- Transportation
- Commerce and Job Development (Vice Chair)
- Alcoholic Beverage Control

== Electoral history ==
=== 2022 ===
North Carolina House of Representatives 97th district general election, 2022
Party	Candidate	Votes	%
Republican	Jason Saine (incumbent)	28,875	100%
Total votes		28,875	100%
Republican hold			

=== 2020 ===
North Carolina House of Representatives 97th district general election, 2020
Party	Candidate	Votes	%
Republican	Jason Saine (incumbent)	35,988	74.13%
Democratic	Greg McBryde	12,558	25.87%
Total votes		48,546	100%
Republican hold			

=== 2018 ===
North Carolina House of Representatives 97th district Republican primary election, 2018
Party	Candidate	Votes	%
Republican	Jason Saine (incumbent)	6,927	83.07%
Republican	Nic Haag	1,412	16.93%
Total votes		8,339	100%

North Carolina House of Representatives 97th district general election, 2018
Party	Candidate	Votes	%
Republican	Jason Saine (incumbent)	22,122	70.51%
Democratic	Natalie Robertson	9,252	29.49%
Total votes		31,374	100%
Republican hold			

=== 2016 ===
North Carolina House of Representatives 97th district general election, 2016
Party	Candidate	Votes	%
Republican	Jason Saine (incumbent)	31,390	100%
Total votes		31,390	100%
Republican hold			

=== 2014 ===
North Carolina House of Representatives 97th district general election, 2014
Party	Candidate	Votes	%
Republican	Jason Saine (incumbent)	16,604	70.65%
Democratic	Rosemary B. Hubbard	6,898	29.35%
Total votes		23,502	100%
Republican hold			

=== 2012 ===
North Carolina House of Representatives 97th district Republican primary election, 2012
Party	Candidate	Votes	%
Republican	Jason Saine (incumbent)	5,982	51.57%
Republican	Jim Klein	4,003	34.51%
Republican	Charles E. Newman	1,615	13.92%
Total votes		11,600	100%

North Carolina House of Representatives 97th district general election, 2012
Party	Candidate	Votes	%
Republican	Jason Saine (incumbent)	26,690	100%
Total votes		26,690	100%
Republican hold			

North Carolina House of Representatives
Preceded by Jonathan Rhyne	Member of the North Carolina House of Representatives from the 97th district 2011–2024	Succeeded by Heather Rhyne
