= 1965 All-Atlantic Coast Conference football team =

American college football all-star team

The 1965 All-Atlantic Coast Conference football team consists of American football players chosen by various selectors for their All-Atlantic Coast Conference ("ACC") teams for the 1965 NCAA University Division football season. Selectors in 1965 included the Associated Press (AP) and the United Press International (UPI). Players selected to the first team by both the AP and UPI are displayed below in bold.

== All-Atlantic Coast Conference selections ==
=== Offensive selections ===
==== Ends ====
- **J. R. Wilburn**, South Carolina (AP-1, UPI-1)
- **Chuck Drulis**, Duke (AP-1, UPI-1)

==== Offensive tackles ====
- **Johnny Boyette**, Clemson (AP-1, UPI-1)
- Bill Jones, Duke (AP-1)
- Dave Ellis, North Carolina State (UPI-1)

==== Offensive guards ====
- **John McNabb**, Duke (AP-1, UPI-1)
- **John Stec**, North Carolina State (AP-1, UPI-1)

==== Centers ====
- **Ed Stringer**, North Carolina (AP-1, UPI-1)

==== Backs ====
- **Danny Talbott**, North Carolina (AP-1, UPI-1)
- **Hugh Mauldin**, Clemson (AP-1, UPI-1)
- **Jay Calabrese**, Duke (AP-1, UPI-1)
- Shelby Mansfield, North Carolina State (AP-1)
- Bob Davis, Virginia (UPI-1)

=== Defensive selections ===
==== Defensive ends ====
- **Pete Sokalsky**, North Carolina State (AP-1, UPI-1)
- **Butch Sursavage**, Clemson (AP-1, UPI-1)

==== Defensive tackles ====
- **Dennis Byrd**, North Carolina State (AP-1, UPI-1)
- Chuck Stavins, Duke (AP-1)
- Steve Cox, South Carolina (UPI-1)

==== Middle guards ====
- **Joe Fratangelo**, North Carolina (AP-1, UPI-1)

==== Linebackers ====
- **Bob Matheson**, Duke (AP-1, UPI-1)
- **Bill Hecht**, Clemson (AP-1, UPI-1)

==== Defensive backs ====
- **Tony Golmont**, North Carolina State (AP-1, UPI-1)
- **Joe Carazo**, Wake Forest (AP-1, UPI-1)
- **Bob Sullivan**, Maryland (AP-1, UPI-1)
- **Benny Galloway**, South Carolina (AP-1, UPI-1)

== Key ==
- **Bold** = consensus first-team All-ACC players selected to the first team by both the AP and UPI
- AP = Associated Press, chosen by writers
- UPI = United Press International

== See also ==
- 1965 College Football All-America Team
