= Jake Curhan =

American football player (born 1998)

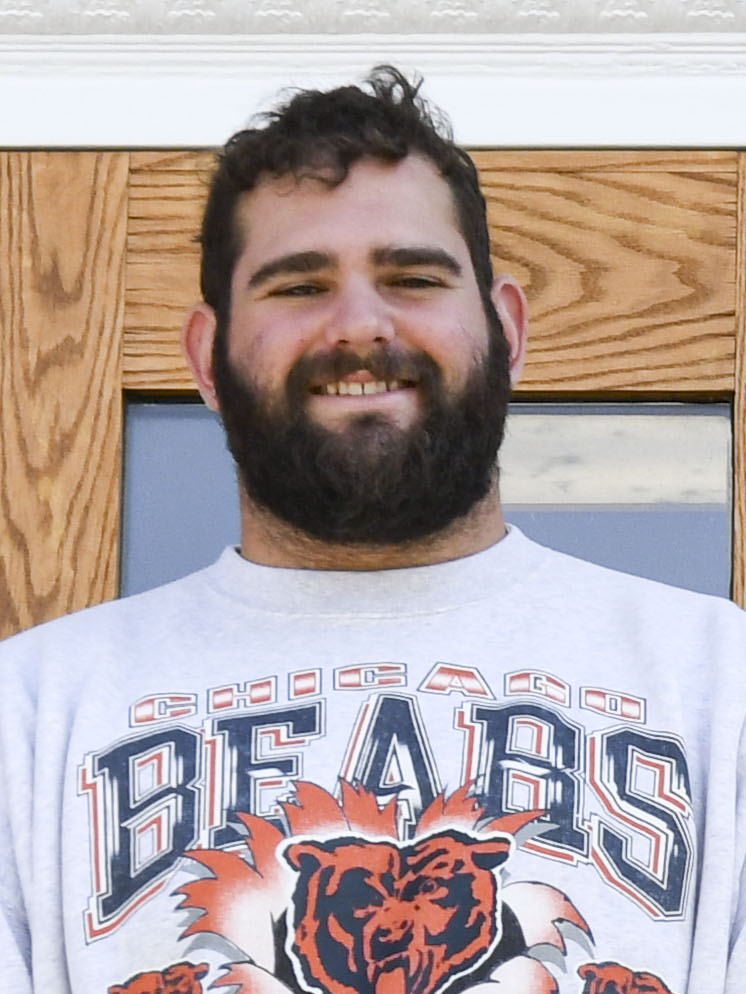
- Curhan in 2024

No. 71 – Carolina Panthers
- Position: Offensive tackle
- Roster status: Practice squad

Personal information
- Born: February 9, 1998 (age 28); Larkspur, California, U.S.
- Listed height: 6 ft 6 in (1.98 m)
- Listed weight: 325 lb (147 kg)

Career information
- High school: Redwood (Larkspur)
- College: California (2016–2020)
- NFL draft: 2021: undrafted

Career history
- Seattle Seahawks (2021–2023); Chicago Bears (2024); Arizona Cardinals (2025); Carolina Panthers (2025–present)

Career NFL statistics as of Week 8, 2026
- Games played: 54
- Games started: 12
- Stats at Pro Football Reference

Jake Curhan (born February 9, 1998) is an American professional football offensive tackle for the Carolina Panthers of the National Football League (NFL). He played college football for the California Golden Bears, and was a two-time Pac-12 honorable mention. He was signed by the Seattle Seahawks as an undrafted free agent following the 2021 NFL draft, debuted in the NFL that season, and started five games at right tackle while also playing in 10 other games as a rookie.

== Early life ==
Curhan was born in Larkspur, California, about 16 miles north of San Francisco, and is Jewish. His father, Greg Curhan, had attended Dartmouth College, and his mother, Randi Curhan, had attended the University of Pennsylvania. He grew up in Corte Madera, in Marin County, California, with his parents and two older brothers. Every summer he went to a Jewish summer camp on the east coast of the United States. He played competitive travel basketball, and his mother recalls that because of his size: "Kids would always be kind of ricocheting off of him in the game. He was like a wall." He lives in Larkspur.

Curhan attended Redwood High School (2016) in Larkspur. He played one season of high school basketball. He only began to play football when he was a sophomore in high school. He started on the offensive line for three seasons, from 2013 to 15, even though 2013 was his first time playing the sport. As a junior, he was Honorable Mention Marin County Athletic League on both the offensive and defensive lines.

As a senior, he moved to left tackle and played on the defensive line. Prior to his senior season, he earned preseason All-Northern California honors from SportStars, was listed at No. 8 among players to watch by the San Francisco Chronicle, and was named the No. 2 player in the North Bay Area by North Bay Preps. In his senior season he was team captain, and was named Lineman of the Year by the Marin County Athletic League, first-team All-State Medium School by Cal-Hi Sports, and San Francisco All-Metro.

== College career ==
In 2016, Curhan was a three-star scholarship recruit to the University of California, Berkeley (B.A. in Business Administration; 2020), spending his first year as a redshirt. In 2017, Curhan started in all 12 games on offense for the California Golden Bears, playing right tackle while earning Pac-12 Conference All-Academic honors. He adopted the nickname on his Instagram account of "the Bear Jew." Following a game against Ole Miss, he was named the team's player of the week.

As a sophomore in 2018, Curhan started in all 13 games, earning Pac-12 All-Academic honors for the second consecutive year. He also made two tackles on offensive turnovers.

Prior to his junior year, he was named fourth-team preseason All-Pac-12 by Athlon and Phil Steele, and honorable mention by Pro Football Focus (PFF). Curhan was a first-team midseason All-Pac-12 selection of SB Nation, and a second-team selection of the Bay Area News Group (BANG). He started every game for the third straight year as a junior in 2019, was named All-Pac 12 honorable mention, earned All-Pac-12 honors from Phil Steele and PFF, and served as team captain.

Before the 2020 season Curhan was a Preseason All-California Region selection by SportsPac12, was named to the preseason Outland Trophy Watch List, and was named second-team (BANG/Jon Wilner, Pac-12 Media, Phil Steele) and third-team (Athlon, Lindy's Sports, Pick Six Previews) preseason All-Pac-12. In a shortened 2020 season that included just four games, he made two starts, only missed two due to Covid contact tracing. He was given honorable mention All-Pac-12 honors by the conference's coaches. As a junior he was a member of the conference's initial Pac-12 Academic Honor Roll that replaced its Pac-12 All-Academic teams. In his college career he was a starter in all 40 games he played, all at right tackle. Rather than play an additional season, Curhan declared for the NFL draft.

On January 30, 2021, Curhan played for the National team in a 27–24 victory over the American squad in the 2021 Senior Bowl. The Pro Football Network reported: "Curhan showed potentially underrated athleticism at 6-foot-6, 323 pounds, and his length also gives him utility in the trenches." He posted a 5.42 40-yard dash at Cal's annual Pro Day on March 18, 2021.

== Professional career ==
Pre-draft measurables
Height	Weight	Arm length	Hand span	Wingspan	40-yard dash	10-yard split	20-yard split	20-yard shuttle	Three-cone drill	Vertical jump	Broad jump	Bench press
6 ft 5 7/8 in (1.98 m)	316 lb (143 kg)	33 1/2 in (0.85 m)	10 1/4 in (0.26 m)	6 ft 9 1/2 in (2.07 m)	5.42 s	1.89 s	3.17 s	4.84 s	8.07 s	24.0 in (0.61 m)	8 ft 6 in (2.59 m)	15 reps
All values from Pro Day

The website Walter Football ranked Curhan as the No. 16 offensive tackle in the draft, described him as a "steady pass protector and quality run blocker," and projected him as being picked in the third to fifth round. He was not selected in the 2021 NFL draft on April 29 to May 1, 2021.

=== Seattle Seahawks ===
Curhan was then signed by the Seattle Seahawks as an undrafted free agent, receiving the largest signing bonus among the team's undrafted class; he was the only undrafted free agent to make the Seahawks’ regular season roster in 2021. After impressing the team in back-to-back preseason starts, with coach Pete Carroll noting that he gave up only one pressure on “27 or 28″ pass attempts playing right tackle during the preseason, he was given a spot with the team on the final 53-man roster on August 31, 2021.

He made his NFL debut in week one against the Indianapolis Colts on September 12, 2021, appearing on four snaps in the 28–16 win. He made his first start on December 12, at right tackle. In 2021 he played 405 snaps in 15 games, making five starts (in which the team won three games), and wasn't penalized a single time. He started the last five games of the season at right tackle, playing all offensive snaps in each game. During that span, PFF graded him as the 16th-best run blocking tackle out of 54 qualified players.

Curhan entered the 2023 season as a backup tackle. He was thrust into the starting lineup in Week 2 following an injury to right tackle Abraham Lucas, and started the next four games. He was waived on November 18, 2023, and re-signed to the practice squad. He was promoted to the active roster on December 30.

=== Chicago Bears ===
On March 18, 2024, Curhan signed with the Chicago Bears. He was waived on August 27, and re-signed to the practice squad. Curhan was promoted to the active roster on November 9.

=== Arizona Cardinals ===
On April 3, 2025, Curhan signed a one-year contract with the Arizona Cardinals. He was waived on August 26 as part of final roster cuts and re-signed to the practice squad the next day.

=== Carolina Panthers ===
On October 1, 2025, Curhan was signed by the Carolina Panthers off of the Cardinals' practice squad.

On August 5, 2026, Curhan re-signed with the Panthers. Curhan was released by Carolina on August 30 as a part of final roster cuts; he was re–signed to the team's practice squad the next day.

== See also ==
- List of select Jewish football players
