= North Carolina's 97th House district =

American legislative district

North Carolina's 97th State House of Representatives district
Representative
Heather Rhyne; R–Lincolnton
- Demographics: 82% White; 6% Black; 8% Hispanic; 1% Asian; 3% Multiracial
- Population (2024): 92,716

North Carolina's 97th House district is one of 120 districts in the North Carolina House of Representatives. It has been represented by Republican Heather Rhyne since 2024.

== Geography ==
Since 2003, the district has included all of Lincoln County. The district overlaps with the 44th Senate district.

== District officeholders ==
Representative	Party	Dates	Notes	Counties
District created January 1, 1993.				1993–2003; Parts of Wayne, Sampson, and Duplin counties.
Jerry Braswell (Goldsboro)	Democratic	January 1, 1993 – February 11, 2000	Resigned.	1993–2003; Parts of Wayne, Sampson, and Duplin counties.
Vacant		February 11, 2000 – March 21, 2000		1993–2003; Parts of Wayne, Sampson, and Duplin counties.
Jimmie Ford (Goldsboro)	Democratic	March 21, 2000 – January 1, 2001	Appointed to finish Braswell's term. Lost re-nomination.	1993–2003; Parts of Wayne, Sampson, and Duplin counties.
Larry Bell (Clinton)	Democratic	January 1, 2001 – January 1, 2003	Redistricted to the 21st district.	1993–2003; Parts of Wayne, Sampson, and Duplin counties.
Joe Kiser (Vale)	Republican	January 1, 2003 – January 1, 2009	Redistricted from the 45th district. Retired.	2003–Present; All of Lincoln County.
Jonathan Rhyne Jr. (Lincolnton)	Republican	January 1, 2009 – August 15, 2011	Resigned.	2003–Present; All of Lincoln County.
Vacant		August 15, 2011 – August 24, 2011		2003–Present; All of Lincoln County.
Jason Saine (Lincolnton)	Republican	August 24, 2011 – August 12, 2024	Appointed to finish Rhyne's term. Resigned.	2003–Present; All of Lincoln County.
Vacant		August 12, 2024 – August 19, 2024		2003–Present; All of Lincoln County.
Heather Rhyne (Lincolnton)	Republican	August 19, 2024 – Present	Appointed to finish Saine's term.	2003–Present; All of Lincoln County.

== Election results ==
=== 2024 ===
North Carolina House of Representatives 97th district general election, 2024
Party	Candidate	Votes	%
Republican	Heather Rhyne (incumbent)	43,332	100%
Total votes		43,332	100%
Republican hold			

=== 2022 ===
North Carolina House of Representatives 97th district general election, 2022
Party	Candidate	Votes	%
Republican	Jason Saine (incumbent)	28,875	100%
Total votes		28,875	100%
Republican hold			

=== 2020 ===
North Carolina House of Representatives 97th district general election, 2020
Party	Candidate	Votes	%
Republican	Jason Saine (incumbent)	35,988	74.13%
Democratic	Greg McBryde	12,558	25.87%
Total votes		48,546	100%
Republican hold			

=== 2018 ===
North Carolina House of Representatives 97th district Republican primary election, 2018
Party	Candidate	Votes	%
Republican	Jason Saine (incumbent)	6,927	83.07%
Republican	Nic Haag	1,412	16.93%
Total votes		8,339	100%

North Carolina House of Representatives 97th district general election, 2018
Party	Candidate	Votes	%
Republican	Jason Saine (incumbent)	22,122	70.51%
Democratic	Natalie Robertson	9,252	29.49%
Total votes		31,374	100%
Republican hold			

=== 2016 ===
North Carolina House of Representatives 97th district general election, 2016
Party	Candidate	Votes	%
Republican	Jason Saine (incumbent)	31,390	100%
Total votes		31,390	100%
Republican hold			

=== 2014 ===
North Carolina House of Representatives 97th district general election, 2014
Party	Candidate	Votes	%
Republican	Jason Saine (incumbent)	16,604	70.65%
Democratic	Rosemary B. Hubbard	6,898	29.35%
Total votes		23,502	100%
Republican hold			

=== 2012 ===
North Carolina House of Representatives 97th district Republican primary election, 2012
Party	Candidate	Votes	%
Republican	Jason Saine (incumbent)	5,982	51.57%
Republican	Jim Klein	4,003	34.51%
Republican	Charles E. Newman	1,615	13.92%
Total votes		11,600	100%

North Carolina House of Representatives 97th district general election, 2012
Party	Candidate	Votes	%
Republican	Jason Saine (incumbent)	26,690	100%
Total votes		26,690	100%
Republican hold			

=== 2010 ===
North Carolina House of Representatives 97th district general election, 2010
Party	Candidate	Votes	%
Republican	Jonathan Rhyne Jr. (incumbent)	18,274	100%
Total votes		18,274	100%
Republican hold			

=== 2008 ===
North Carolina House of Representatives 97th district general election, 2008
Party	Candidate	Votes	%
Republican	Jonathan Rhyne Jr.	25,765	100%
Total votes		25,765	100%
Republican hold			

=== 2006 ===
North Carolina House of Representatives 97th district general election, 2006
Party	Candidate	Votes	%
Republican	Joe Kiser (incumbent)	12,080	100%
Total votes		12,080	100%
Republican hold			

=== 2004 ===
North Carolina House of Representatives 97th district general election, 2004
Party	Candidate	Votes	%
Republican	Joe Kiser (incumbent)	17,888	61.13%
Democratic	Ken H. Fortenberry	11,374	38.87%
Total votes		29,262	100%
Republican hold			

=== 2002 ===
North Carolina House of Representatives 97th district Republican primary election, 2002
Party	Candidate	Votes	%
Republican	Joe Kiser (incumbent)	4,362	70.30%
Republican	David J. Noles	1,843	29.70%
Total votes		6,205	100%

North Carolina House of Representatives 97th district general election, 2002
Party	Candidate	Votes	%
Republican	Joe Kiser (incumbent)	11,859	58.51%
Democratic	Floyd E. Mason	7,760	38.29%
Libertarian	Bryan Edwards	650	3.21%
Total votes		20,269	100%
Republican hold			

=== 2000 ===
North Carolina House of Representatives 97th district Democratic primary election, 2000
Party	Candidate	Votes	%
Democratic	Larry Bell	2,822	57.33%
Democratic	Jimmie Ford (incumbent)	2,100	42.67%
Total votes		4,922	100%

North Carolina House of Representatives 97th district general election, 2000
Party	Candidate	Votes	%
Democratic	Larry Bell	9,131	72.63%
Republican	John Sherman Best	3,441	27.37%
Total votes		12,572	100%
Democratic hold			
