= Burk Uzzle =

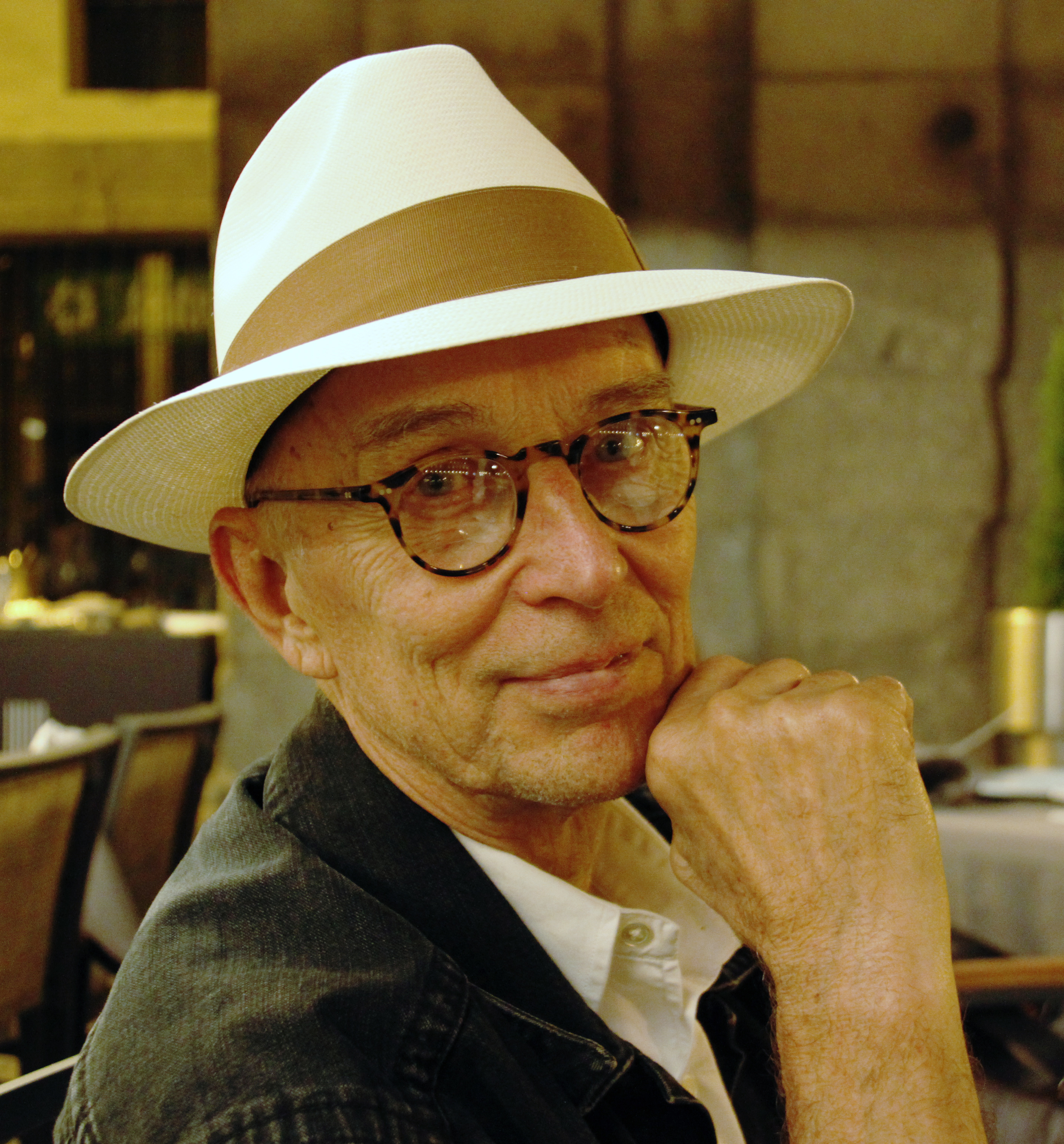

Burk Uzzle (August 4, 1938 in Raleigh, North Carolina) is an American photojournalist, previously member of Magnum Photos, and the photographic cooperative's president from 1979 to 1980.

Burk Uzzle (burkuzzle.com) has spent his life as a professional photographer. Initially grounded in documentary photography when he was the youngest contract photographer hired by Life magazine at age 23, his work continues to reflect the human condition. For sixteen years during the 1970s and 1980s, he was an active contributor to the evolution of Magnum and served as its President in 1979 and 1980. While affiliated with the cooperative, he produced the iconic and symbolic image of Woodstock (showing Nick Ercoline and Bobbi Kelly hugging), helped people grasp an understanding of the assassination and funeral of Dr. Martin Luther King Jr., and powerfully projects comprehension of what it means to be an outsider - from Cambodian war refugees to disenfranchised populations without voice or agency to portraits of communities not identified on a roadmap. His life, philosophy, and continuing work was explored in the critically acclaimed 2020 documentary feature film F11 and Be There by director Jethro Waters.

His archive spans more than six decades and captures much of the history of analog and digital photography. His current bodies of work rest deep in issues of social justice. A dozen years ago, Uzzle returned to North Carolina and now lives and works in two century old industrial buildings located in downtown Wilson not far from where he was born.

== Solo exhibitions ==
- 2017 "Perceptions + Recognitions : African-Americans in Eastern North Carolina," Greenville Museum of Art, Greenville NC (Catalogue)
- 2016 "Burk Uzzle: American Chronicle," North Carolina Museum of Art, Raleigh NC
- 2016 "All About America: Photographs by Burk Uzzle," Ackland Art Museum UNC Chapel Hill, Chapel Hill NC (Catalogue)
- 2016 "Burk Uzzle Retrospective," Nasher Museum of Art at Duke University, Durham NC
- 2015 "Burk Uzzle: American Puzzles," Steven Kasher Gallery, New York NY
- 2012 "Burned," Laurence Miller Gallery, New York NY
- 2011 "Burk Uzzle," Flanders Gallery, Raleigh NC
- 2010 "Martin Luther King, Jr.," Wilson Arts Council, Wilson NC
- 2009 "Woodstock," Florida Museum of Photographic Arts, Tampa FL
- 2009 "Woodstock 40th Anniversary," Laurence Miller Gallery, New York NY
- 2008 "Burk Uzzle Recent Work," Barton College, Wilson NC
- 2007 "Just Add Water: America in Color," Laurence Miller Gallery, New York NY
- 2006 "Burk Uzzle," Michael Dawson Gallery, Los Angeles CA
- 2005 "A Family Named Spot," The Southeast Museum of Photography, Daytona Beach FL
- 2004 "Burk Uzzle," Laurence Miller Gallery, New York NY
- 2001 "America in the Seventies," Bodo Nieman Gallery, Berlin Germany
- 1998 "Daytona Bike Week," Gallery Contempo, St. Augustine FL
- 1996 "Correspondence Between Islands," Danforth Gallery, Portland ME
- 1994 "Burk Uzzle Recent Work," The Photography Gallery, Drew University, Madison NJ
- 1992 "A Progress Report on Civilization," The Chrysler Museum, Norfolk VA (Catalogue)
- 1985 "Burk Uzzle," 253 Gallery, Norfolk VA
- 1984 "All America: Photographs by Burk Uzzle," Philadelphia Museum of Art, Philadelphia PA
- 1983 "Burk Uzzle," The Photographers' Gallery, London England
- 1982 "Burk Uzzle," The Ffoto Gallery, Cardiff Wales
- 1982 "Burk Uzzle," Open Eye Gallery, Liverpool England
- 1980 "News from Cambodia," International Center of Photography, New York NY
- 1979 "Burk Uzzle," Gallerie Agathe Gaillard, Paris France
- 1979 "Burk Uzzle," Galerie Fiolet, Amsterdam Holland
- 1979 "Burk Uzzle," Witkin Gallery, New York NY
- 1979 "Burk Uzzle," Galerie Breitling, Berlin Germany
- 1977 "Burk Uzzle," Aperion Workshop, Traveling exhibition
- 1977 "Burk Uzzle," Columbia College, Chicago IL
- 1974 "Burk Uzzle," Dayton Art Institute, Dayton OH
- 1974 "Burk Uzzle," 831 Gallery, Birmingham MI
- 1973 "Burk Uzzle," University of Massachusetts Art Gallery, Boston MA
- 1971 "Burk Uzzle," Art Institute of Chicago, Chicago IL
- 1970 "Typically American," International Center of Photography, New York NY
- 1969 "Burk Uzzle," Riverside Museum, New York NY

== Museum and public collections ==
- Ackland Art Museum, University of North Carolina at Chapel Hill
- Art Institute of Chicago
- Arts Council of Great Britain
- Bibliothèque Nationale de France
- Cameron Art Museum
- Chrysler Museum of Art
- Fogg Art Museum, Harvard University
- George Eastman House
- Greenville Museum of Art
- Henry Art Gallery, University of Washington at Seattle
- International Center of Photography NYC
- Library of Congress
- Metropolitan Museum of Art
- Museum of Modern Art
- Nasher Museum of Art, Duke University
- National Museum of Modern Art, Japan
- North Carolina Collection, Wilson Library, University of North Carolina at Chapel Hill
- North Carolina Museum of Art
- Philadelphia Museum of Art
- Rijksmuseum Amsterdam
- Santa Barbara Museum of Art
- Smithsonian Institution
- Stedelijk Museum
- University of Texas
- Weatherspoon Museum

== Books, monographs, and anthologies ==
- Perceptions and Recognitions: African-Americans of Eastern North Carolina. Greenville Museum of Art. 2017. ASIN B077H573S9.
- All About America. Ackland Art Museum. 2016.
- Just Add Water. Five Ties Publishing. 2007. p. 120. ISBN 978-0977719365.
- A Family Named Spot. Five Ties Publishing. 2006. p. 174. ISBN 978-0977719303.
- A Progress Report on Civilization. The Chrysler Museum. 1992. ISBN 978-0940744653.
- MON AMERIQUE (French). Contrejour. 1985. ISBN 978-2859490607.
- All American. Aperture. 1984. ISBN 978-0060083083.
- Koudelka, Josef; Uzzle, Burk; Bullock, Wynn (1976). Aperture Number 77. Aperture. p. 120. ASIN B0026C3Z9I.
- Landscapes. Magnum. 1973. p. 96. ISBN 978-0914122012.
