= Polkadot, North Carolina =

Polkadot
- Unincorporated community
- Location within North Carolina Location within the United States
- Coordinates: 35°27′15″N 81°15′17″W
- Country: United States
- State: North Carolina
- County: Lincoln
- Elevation: 801 ft (244 m)
- Time zone: UTC-5 (Eastern (EST))
  - Summer (DST): UTC-4 (EDT)
- GNIS feature ID: 1001791

Polkadot is an unincorporated community in Lincoln County, North Carolina, United States.
