= F11 and Be There =

Documentary Film by Jethro Waters

F11 and Be there
- Directed by: Jethro Waters
- Produced by: Jethro Waters, Janet Kagan, Tom Chandler
- Starring: Burk Uzzle
- Cinematography: Jethro Waters
- Edited by: Jethro Waters
- Music by: Natalie Prass; Eric Slick; Luke Norton
- Production company: Waters Film LTD
- Distributed by: First Run Features (US)
- Release dates: October 25, 2018 (Austin Film Festival); April 6, 2020
- Running time: 84 minutes
- Country: USA
- Language: English

F11 and Be There is a 2018 documentary film by Jethro Waters about Magnum Photos and Life Magazine photographer Burk Uzzle. Produced, directed, filmed, and edited by Waters, F11 and Be There explores civil rights, race, social justice, and art through Uzzle's 65+ year legacy, as well as his continuing work focusing on African Americans in the South. Uzzle is well known for his photographs of the Civil Rights Movement of the 1960s, the funeral of Martin Luther King Jr., as well as his iconic picture of Woodstock which later became the cover of the official Woodstock album. The original score for the film was composed and performed by Natalie Prass and Eric Slick, with animations by Cable Hardin.

== Release and accolades ==
=== Release ===
F11 and Be There was first released in the United States on October 25, 2018, at the Austin Film Festival. A shortened 55 minute version of the film was released on television through PBS and UNCTV as the premiere episode of the southern documentary series Reel South on April 6, 2020. The full-length feature film was released in select theaters and streaming services across the United States on Oct 9, 2020.

=== Awards ===
- Won Midsouth Emmy Awards for Best Documentary - Cultural (2021)
- Official Selection, 2018 Austin Film Festival
- Official Selection, 2019 Full Frame Documentary Film Festival
- Official Selection, 2019 RiverRun Film Festival
- Official Selection, 2019 Oaxaca FilmFest
