= Danny Talbott =

American sportsman (1944–2020)

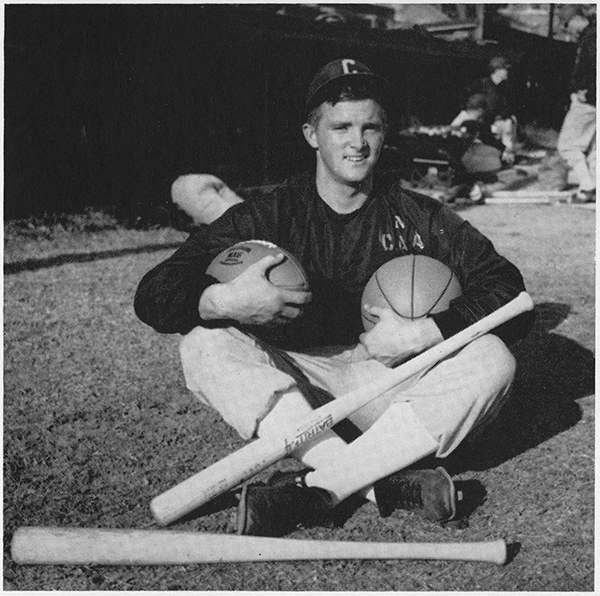
- Talbott c. 1966–67

No. 10
- Position: Quarterback

Personal information
- Born: November 1, 1944; Rocky Mount, North Carolina, U.S.
- Died: January 19, 2020 (aged 75); Rocky Mount, North Carolina, U.S.

Career information
- High school: Rocky Mount (NC)
- College: North Carolina
- NFL draft: 1967: 17th round, 432nd overall pick

Career history
- Washington Redskins (1968–1970)*
- * Offseason or practice squad member only

Awards and highlights
- ACC Player of the Year (1965); First-team All-ACC (1965); North Carolina Tar Heels Jersey No. 10 honored; North Carolina Sports Hall of Fame

Joseph Daniel Talbott (November 1, 1944 – January 19, 2020) was an American professional football and baseball player. At the University of North Carolina at Chapel Hill, he was a quarterback for two seasons with the North Carolina Tar Heels football team and was named the ACC Player of the Year in 1966. Talbott also led the Tar Heels baseball team to the College World Series in 1966. He also played basketball for North Carolina on their freshmen team, but gave up the sport to concentrate on football and baseball.

He was drafted in the 17th round of the 1967 NFL/AFL draft by the San Francisco 49ers. He did not sign a contract with the team and played baseball professionally in the Baltimore Orioles's minor league system instead. His NFL draft rights were traded to the Washington Redskins for a 10th round draft pick on March 5, 1968, but during training camp he was called into active service duty for the United States Army Reserve and missed the entire season. He spent the 1969 season on the Redskins' taxi squad, and was released during final roster cuts before the start of the 1970 season on August 10, 1970.

Talbott was inducted into the North Carolina Sports Hall of Fame in 2003. His No. 10 football jersey hangs in Kenan Stadium along with other honored jerseys.

Talbott led Rocky Mount Senior High School to winning North Carolina Class 4A (North Carolina's former highest classification for high school athletics) state championships in three different sports – baseball, basketball, and football – all during his senior year in 1962–63. In 2018, the Danny Talbott Cancer Center at Nash UNC Health Care in Rocky Mount, North Carolina was named after him.

Talbott died at the age of 75 on January 19, 2020, of complications from cancer.
