= Sage Surratt =

American football player (born 1998)

Profile
- Position: Tight end

Personal information
- Born: April 13, 1998 (age 28); Lincolnton, North Carolina, U.S.
- Listed height: 6 ft 3 in (1.91 m)
- Listed weight: 215 lb (98 kg)

Career information
- High school: Lincolnton
- College: Wake Forest (2017–2020)
- NFL draft: 2021: undrafted

Career history
- Detroit Lions (2021)*; Birmingham Stallions (2022); Los Angeles Chargers (2022)*; New Orleans Breakers (2023); Memphis Showboats (2024); Arizona Cardinals (2024)*
- * Offseason or practice squad member only

Awards and highlights
- USFL champion (2022); First-team All-ACC (2019)
- Stats at Pro Football Reference

Sage Surratt (born April 13, 1998) is an American professional football tight end. He was signed by the Detroit Lions as an undrafted free agent after not being selected in the 2021 NFL draft, and was on their practice squad for 2021. He played college football at Wake Forest.

== Early life ==
Surratt attended East Lincoln High School in Denver, North Carolina, before transferring his senior year to Lincolnton High School in Lincolnton, North Carolina. He played football and basketball and was an All-Conference selection in each of his four seasons in both sports. In football, he set state records for receptions (366), receiving yards (5,926) and touchdown receptions (80). In basketball, Surratt finished as the second-leading scorer in North Carolina history with 2,951 points. Surratt was honored as the 2016–17 NCHSAA Male Athlete of the Year. He was also the valedictorian of his senior class at Lincolnton.

== College career ==
Surratt redshirted his true freshman season in 2017. As a redshirt freshman in 2018, Surratt was the Demon Deacons second leading receiver with 41 receptions for 581 yards and four touchdowns. He started the first game of his collegiate career and was named the Atlantic Coast Conference Rookie of the Week after catching 11 passes for 150 yards against Tulane.

Surratt was named the Fred Biletnikoff Award watchlist four weeks into his redshirt sophomore season in 2019. He was named the ACC Receiver of the Week in four out of the first eight weeks of the season and was the first player from a Power Five conference to accumulate 1,000 receiving yards. Surratt suffered a season-ending shoulder injury on November 9, 2019 against Virginia Tech. He finished the season with 1,001 yards on 66 receptions with 11 touchdowns. Despite only playing in nine games, Surratt was named a semifinalist for the Biletnikoff Award and first team All-ACC. After considering entering the 2020 NFL draft, Surratt announced that he would return to Wake Forest for his redshirt junior season. However, before the start of the 2020 season, Surratt opted out for the season.

=== Statistics ===
College statistics
Season	Team	Games	Receiving			
Season	Team	GP	Rec	Yards	Avg	TD
2017	Wake Forest	(redshirt) Redshirted				
2018	Wake Forest	13	41	581	14.2	4
2019	Wake Forest	9	66	1,001	15.2	11
2020	Wake Forest	Opted out due to COVID-19				
Career		22	107	1,582	14.8	15

== Professional career ==
Pre-draft measurables
Height	Weight	Arm length	Hand span	Wingspan	40-yard dash	20-yard shuttle	Broad jump
6 ft 2 1/2 in (1.89 m)	209 lb (95 kg)	32 1/4 in (0.82 m)	9 in (0.23 m)	6 ft 6 1/2 in (1.99 m)	4.70 s	4.25 s	9 ft 7 in (2.92 m)
All values from Pro Day

=== Detroit Lions ===
Surratt signed with the Detroit Lions as an undrafted free agent on May 3, 2021. He was waived on August 31, 2021 and re-signed to the practice squad the next day. He was released on September 15, 2021.

=== Birmingham Stallions ===
On March 10, 2022, Surratt was drafted by the Birmingham Stallions of the United States Football League (USFL). He was transferred to the team's practice squad on April 14, 2022, and remained on the inactive roster on April 22. He was moved to the active roster on May 6, and to the inactive roster again on May 14 with a hip flexor. He was moved back to the active roster on May 20.

=== Los Angeles Chargers ===
On July 31, 2022, Surratt signed with the Los Angeles Chargers. He was waived with an injury settlement on August 30, 2022.

=== New Orleans Breakers ===
On February 15, 2023, Surratt signed with the New Orleans Breakers of the USFL. The Breakers folded when the XFL and USFL merged to create the United Football League (UFL).

=== Memphis Showboats ===
On January 5, 2024, Surratt was drafted by the Memphis Showboats during the 2024 UFL dispersal draft. His contract was terminated on August 20, 2024, to sign with an NFL team.

=== Arizona Cardinals ===
On August 21, 2024, Surratt signed with the Arizona Cardinals. He was waived/injured on August 27, 2024.

== Personal life ==
Surratt's older brother, Chazz Surratt, played linebacker at North Carolina, and was drafted by the Minnesota Vikings in the 2021 NFL draft.
