= Lincoln Theatre Guild =

The Lincoln Theatre Guild is a non-profit community theater organization founded in 1981. The Guild serves Lincoln County, North Carolina, United States, and the surrounding Piedmont region.

== History ==
The Lincoln Theatre Guild was formed in 1981 with 15 members. The first guild activity was an acting workshop, which was followed by the first production, Harvey. The first guild president was Barrie Howard. A notable early production was Prelude to Victory, a musical drama telling the story of the a revolutionary war battle fought nearby. In 1983, a successful production of Scrooge, a musical adaption of Dickens' A Christmas Carol, helped give the guild a stable financial base. The group grew throughout the 1980s, performing dramas, comedies and musicals. Some shows included Mouse Trap, Harvey, and You're a Good Man, Charlie Brown. In 1988, the group moved their offices and productions to the Lincoln Cultural Center, a renovated former church in Lincolnton, North Carolina. By 1990 the guild was producing a large summer musical each year at the nearby Lincoln Citizens Center as well as 3-4 smaller plays at the Cultural Center.

In 2007 the guild board was restructured. A new president and several new board members were appointed. Recent shows include Alice in Wonderland and Dearly Departed in 2007 and The Actor's Nightmare, Li'l Abner, and And Then There Were None in 2008.

== Productions ==
The guild presently produces 4-5 shows per year. Most shows are held at The Lincoln Cultural Center or the auditorium at North Lincoln High School. The guild also holds an annual summer drama camp in two locations in the county.

== Partnerships ==
The Lincoln Theatre Guild belongs to the Lincoln Arts Council and is a member of the Metrolina Theatre Association. The guild also receives financial backing from local government and businesses.

== Board of directors ==
The guild has a board of directors that meets monthly and is responsible for show selections, technical production and fundraising.

== See also ==
- Lincoln County, North Carolina
