= Chazz Surratt =

American football player (born 1997)

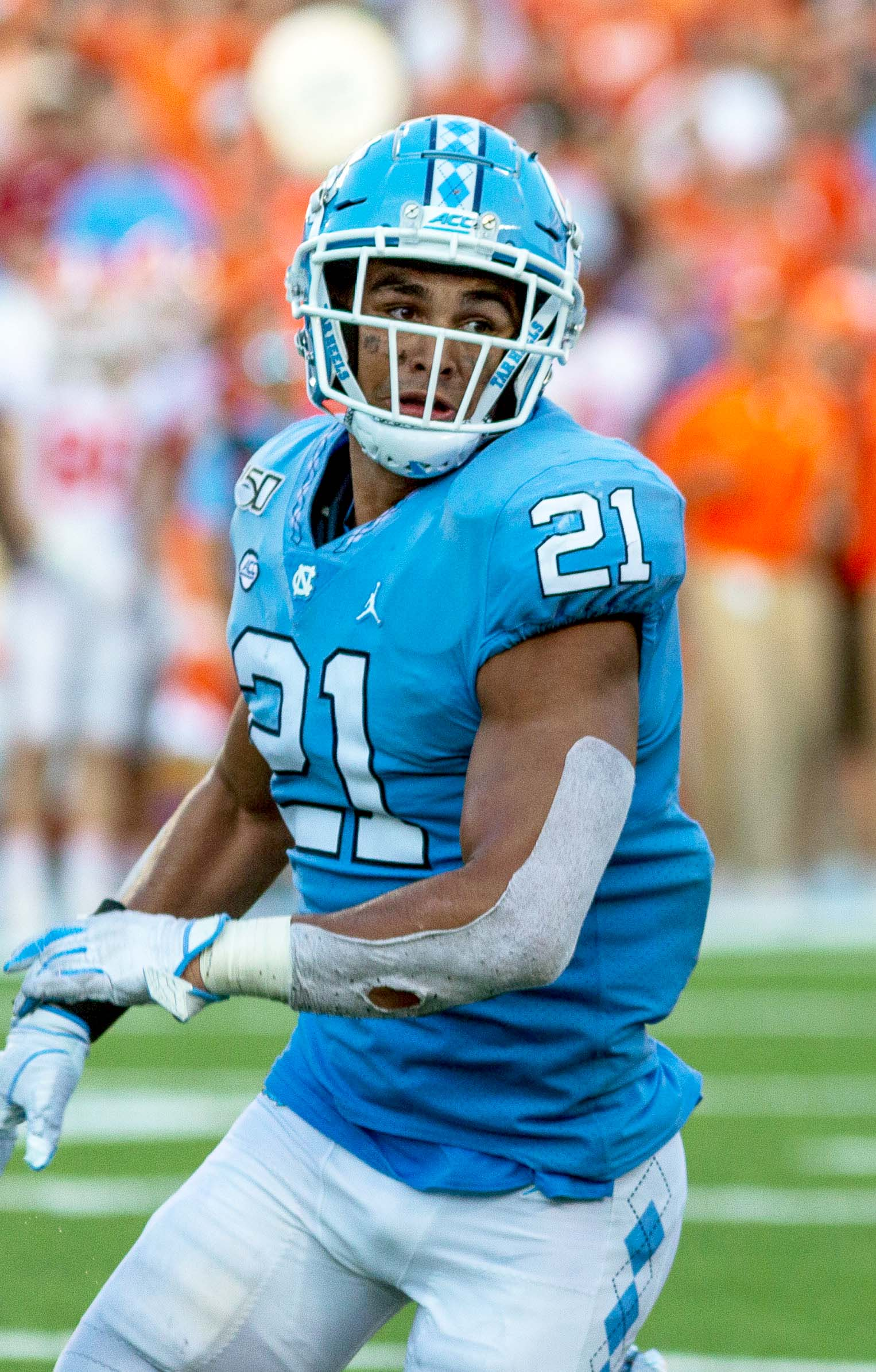
- Surratt with the North Carolina Tar Heels in 2019

No. 44 – Seattle Seahawks
- Position: Outside linebacker
- Roster status: Active

Personal information
- Born: February 16, 1997 (age 29); Charlotte, North Carolina, U.S.
- Listed height: 6 ft 2 in (1.88 m)
- Listed weight: 233 lb (106 kg)

Career information
- High school: East Lincoln (Denver, North Carolina)
- College: North Carolina (2016–2020)
- NFL draft: 2021: 3rd round, 78th overall pick

Career history
- Minnesota Vikings (2021); New York Jets (2022–2024); San Francisco 49ers (2025)*; Seattle Seahawks (2025–present)
- * Offseason or practice squad member only

Awards and highlights
- Super Bowl champion (LX); First-team All-American (2020); 2× First-team All-ACC (2019, 2020)

Career NFL statistics as of 2024
- Total tackles: 37
- Stats at Pro Football Reference

Chazz Surratt (born February 16, 1997) is an American professional football outside linebacker for the Seattle Seahawks of the National Football League (NFL). He played college football for the North Carolina Tar Heels, where he began his career as a quarterback before transitioning to linebacker, and was selected by the Minnesota Vikings in the third round of the 2021 NFL draft.

== Early life ==
Surratt attended East Lincoln High School in Denver, North Carolina. He helped lead the East Lincoln football team to victories in the 2012 2A and 2014 2AA NCHSAA state championship games. A highly regarded high school quarterback, Surratt was a two-time first-team Associated Press (AP) All-State selection. During his senior year, Surratt was named North Carolina AP Offensive Player of the Year, as well as being a Parade All-America and Parade National Player of the Year. Surratt would set the North Carolina high school state record for most career touchdowns with 229. He was also honored as the 2014–15 NCHSAA Male Athlete of the Year.

== College career ==
Recruited by Tar Heel coach Larry Fedora to the University of North Carolina at Chapel Hill to play quarterback, Surratt redshirted during his first season with the program in 2016. He was named the starting quarterback during his redshirt freshman season in 2017, replacing graduate transfer Brandon Harris who had struggled to begin the season. Surratt himself struggled with inconsistency and injury throughout 2017, only appearing in nine games, starting seven. After a suspension to start the 2018 season, Surratt became the backup to Nathan Elliott. He appeared in one game during his redshirt sophomore season, sustaining a season-ending injury against Miami.

When Head Coach Mack Brown returned before the 2019 season, Surratt elected to make the switch to linebacker prior to his redshirt junior season rather than transfer to another school for an opportunity to continue to play quarterback. Carolina had just signed the highly touted Sam Howell and also had quarterbacks Cade Fortin and Jace Ruder on the roster, giving Surratt slim chances to crack the quarterback depth chart. The move to linebacker proved to be a revelation, and Surratt had a successful season highlighted by a game-winning interception against rival Duke. In the 2019 season, Surratt started and played in all 13 games and had 115 tackles, 15 tackles for loss, 6.5 sacks, 1 interception, 1 forced fumble, and 1 fumble recovery. After the completion of the season, Surratt was named first-team All-ACC at the linebacker position. In his redshirt senior season in 2020, Surratt played in 11 games and finished with 91 tackles, 7.5 tackles for loss, 6 sacks, 1 interception, 1 forced fumble, and 1 fumble recovered.

Surratt opted out of participating in the Orange Bowl against Texas A&M, in order to prepare for the 2021 NFL draft.

== Professional career ==
Pre-draft measurables
Height	Weight	Arm length	Hand span	Wingspan	40-yard dash	10-yard split	20-yard split	20-yard shuttle	Three-cone drill	Vertical jump	Bench press
6 ft 2 1/8 in (1.88 m)	229 lb (104 kg)	30 1/4 in (0.77 m)	9 5/8 in (0.24 m)	6 ft 3 1/2 in (1.92 m)	4.59 s	1.62 s	2.68 s	4.18 s	7.04 s	31.5 in (0.80 m)	25 reps
All values from Pro Day

=== Minnesota Vikings ===
==== 2021 season ====
Surratt was drafted in the third round (78th overall) of the 2021 NFL Draft by the Minnesota Vikings.

Entering his inaugural training camp in the NFL, Surratt competed for a starting inside linebacker job against Nick Vigil and Blake Lynch. At the conclusion of the preseason, head coach Mike Zimmer named Surratt a backup inside linebacker behind Anthony Barr, Eric Kendricks, and Nick Vigil.

Surratt finished his rookie season playing in 9 games and played exclusively on special teams with zero defensive snaps.

==== 2022 season ====
Surratt competed for a backup inside linebacker job in training camp against rookie Brian Asamoah. However, he struggled in the Vikings' preseason games and was seen as an improper fit in the team's new defensive scheme.

Surratt was waived on August 30, 2022.

=== New York Jets ===
On September 1, 2022, Surratt was signed to the practice squad of the New York Jets. He signed a reserve/future contract on January 9, 2023.

=== San Francisco 49ers ===
On May 28, 2025, Surratt signed with the San Francisco 49ers. He was released on August 26 as part of final roster cuts.

=== Seattle Seahawks ===
On August 28, 2025, Surratt signed with the Seattle Seahawks. On November 26, Surratt was placed on injured reserve due to an ankle injury suffered in Week 12 against the Tennessee Titans. He was activated on February 5, 2026, ahead of the team's Super Bowl LX matchup against the New England Patriots.

On March 18, 2026, Surratt re-signed with the Seahawks.

== Personal life ==
Surratt's younger brother, Sage Surratt, was an All-Conference wide-receiver at Wake Forest University.
