= Newbold High School =

School in North Carolina, United States

Coordinates: 35.4783°N 81.2375°W

Newbold High School was a racially segregated public high school for African American students active from 1952 until 1968, and located in Lincolnton, Lincoln County, North Carolina.

== History ==
Newbold High School opened on April 20, 1952, to serve African American students from Lincoln County, North Carolina. While the county seat, Lincolnton, had one high school in its city school system for African Americans, Oaklawn High School, the rest of the county did not. Rather than open additional schools, the county school system built a new school which would serve students at Oaklawn as well as students from the rest of the county. Construction of the new campus suffered several setbacks as the county prioritized other projects, with cuts that reduced the number of classrooms and facilities. Only years later were the additional classrooms added, along with a gym.

The school was named for Nathan Carter Newbold, a white educator who oversaw the development of schools for African Americans in North Carolina during the Jim Crow era of school segregation. It was to be called Newbold Union School but Union was dropped because a school for whites with that name existed. Its first principal was George E. Massey.

Like other African American schools during segregation, Newbold struggled for public resources, receiving second-hand books from other schools and relying on community support to buy basic school supplies and equipment. It nonetheless maintained a band, drama club, a public speaking contest, and a well-regarded home economics department. Despite not having a gymnasium at first, it developed a track and field and football programs. Lewis A. Sanders, Albert Stover, and Rudolph Young were prominent football players, and James W. Harper coached. In the 1960–61 season the football team were Southwest District Champions. Its school mascot was a panther and the school colors were blue and yellow.

The effects of school consolidation on achievement were studied at the school. Some students volunteered to bus other students to elementary school before arriving at the school.

An education rally was held at the school in 1962. Wood School principal and author Charles Arthur Shipp Sr. graduated from the school March 27, 1962.

The school closed in 1968 with desegregation and was repurposed as the G. E. Massey Elementary School, honoring the high school's first principal.

== Legacy ==
An alumni reunion was held in 2003. In 2022, both Lincolnton Town Council candidates were alumni.
