= Heather Rhyne =

American politician from North Carolina

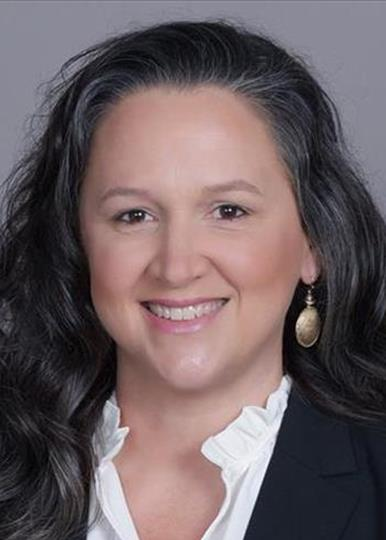

Member of the North Carolina House of Representatives from the 97th district
- Incumbent
- Assumed office August 19, 2024
- Preceded by: Jason Saine

Personal details
- Party: Republican
- Spouse: Chris Rhyne
- Children: 2
- Education: University of North Carolina at Chapel Hill

Heather Rhyne is an American politician who has served as a Republican member of the North Carolina House of Representatives from the 97th district since 2024.

== Electoral history ==
=== 2024 ===
North Carolina House of Representatives 97th district general election, 2024
| Party | Candidate | Votes | % |
|---|---|---|---|
| Republican | Heather Rhyne (incumbent) | 43,332 | 100% |
| Total votes | | 43,332 | 100% |
| Republican hold | | | |

North Carolina House of Representatives
| Preceded by Jason Saine | Member of the North Carolina House of Representatives from the 97th district 2024–Present | Incumbent |
