= Lincolnton High School =

American public school in North Carolina

Location
- 803 N Aspen St; Lincolnton, North Carolina 28092; United States; 35°28′46″N 81°15′37″W

Information
- Type: Public
- Established: 1904 (122 years ago)
- School district: Lincoln County Schools
- CEEB code: 342325
- Teaching staff: 47.99 (FTE)
- Grades: 9–12
- Enrollment: 788 (2023–2024)
- Student to teacher ratio: 16.42
- Colors: Black and gold
- Mascot: Wolves
- Website: www.lcsnc.org/o/lhs

Lincolnton High School is a high school located in Lincolnton, North Carolina. It is a part of the Lincoln County Schools district. Lincolnton's team name are the Wolves, with the school colors being black and gold.

== History ==
Lincolnton High School was established in 1904. The class of 2008 marked Lincolnton High School's 100th graduating class.

== Athletics ==
Lincolnton is a member of the North Carolina High School Athletic Association (NCHSAA) and are classified as a 3A school. The school is a part of the Southern Piedmont 2A/3A/4A Conference. The school's team name is the Wolves and the school colors are black and gold.

Sports at Lincolnton include: baseball, basketball, cross country, football, golf, soccer, softball, swimming, tennis, track & field, volleyball, and wrestling.

=== Sporting achievements ===
Lincolnton has won NCHSAA team state championships in 2A baseball in 1995, and 2A football in 1993 and 2007.

== ACC Barnstorming Tour ==
In 2011, Lincolnton High School hosted the ACC Barnstorming Tour, in which seniors from Duke, UNC, and NC State play against local area high school basketball players.

== Notable alumni ==
- Dennis Byrd, AFL defensive end for the Boston Patriots, member of the College Football Hall of Fame
- Drew Droege, actor, comedian, writer, and director
- Charles A. Gabriel, 11th Chief of Staff of the United States Air Force
- Charles R. Jonas, U.S. Representative from North Carolina for ten terms from 1953 to 1973
- Barclay Radebaugh, college basketball coach
- Dick Smith, MLB outfielder
- Sage Surratt, American professional football tight end
- C. J. Wilson, NFL cornerback
