= West Lincoln High School =

American public school in North Carolina

Location
- 172 Shoal Rd; Lincolnton, North Carolina 28092; United States; 35°29′07″N 81°23′22″W

Information
- Type: Public
- Established: 1961 (65 years ago)
- School district: Lincoln County Schools
- CEEB code: 342335
- Principal: Tracy Eley
- Teaching staff: 45.15 (FTE)
- Grades: 9–12
- Enrollment: 731 (2024-2025)
- Student to teacher ratio: 16.19
- Campus type: Rural
- Colors: Red and gray
- Team name: Rebels
- Website: www.lcsnc.org/o/wlhs

West Lincoln High School is a high school in Lincoln County, North Carolina, outside of Lincolnton. It is a part of the Lincoln County Schools district. The school provides for student development through varied curricula, including Advanced Placement (AP) and honors courses. Students are enrolled in four 90-minute classes each semester.

== Career-technical education ==
Career-technical education, a priority of the Lincoln County Board of Education, is provided at the high school and the Lincoln County School of Technology. LCST, a unique centralized educational center, serves as an extension of the four county high schools. Students attend daily 90-minute classes during the 11th and 12th grades. Career-technical students may participate in apprenticeships, career internships, and earn college credits through articulation agreements with local institutions of higher learning. The Lincoln County Job-Ready System of career majors helps students relate academics to the real world and develop realistic career goals.

== Spirit Week ==
West Lincoln hosts several events every year. Spirit Week is one of the most anticipated events of the school year. Spirit Week is held in the week of the homecoming football game. Every day has a different theme and the students are allowed to dress up for the day. There is always a pajama day, and at the end of the week, the day of the big game, is called "Rowdy Rebel" day. On Rowdy Rebel day, students wear their homecoming shirts and their best pair of overalls. On the morning of Rowdy Rebel day, West Lincoln hosts a "Tractor Parade". Students will sign up and drive their tractors to school. The parade is followed by a pep rally to celebrate homecoming.

== Athletics ==
West Lincoln is a member of the North Carolina High School Athletic Association (NCHSAA) and are classified as a 3A school. The school is a part of the Southern Piedmont 2A/3A/4A Conference. The school's team name is the Rebels and the school colors are red and grey.

Sports at West Lincoln include: football, baseball, basketball, softball, wrestling, tennis, soccer, cross country, golf, track & field, and volleyball.

=== Sporting achievements ===
The West Lincoln wrestling team has won four NCHSAA dual team state championships. In 2000, West Lincoln won their first dual team state title in the 1A/2A class. In 2015, they won their second dual team state championship in the 2A class. In 2018 and 2019, they won back-to-back 2A dual team state titles.

The West Lincoln girls golf team won the NCHSAA 1A/2A state championship in 2020–21.

== Notable alumni ==
- Jethro Waters, filmmaker
