= Jethro Waters =

American independent filmmaker

Jethro Waters is an American independent filmmaker, known for the documentary feature F11 and Be There (2020) and the narrative feature Gunfighter Paradise (2026). He is a screenwriter, director, cinematographer, editor, producer, and composer.

He is also known for directing music videos for various artists, including John Cale, Weyes Blood and Angel Olsen.

Known for a surrealist and experimental style that spans multiple genres, his films are representative of an auteur method, with his cinematography being praised by critics as one of the distinctive elements of his work. His satirical narrative feature Gunfighter Paradise has been described as a dark comedy, horror, and surreal film.

His documentary films have often focused on artists and photographers. He won an Emmy Award for the documentary feature F11 and Be There at the 2021 Midsouth Emmy Awards.

Waters was born in Texas and raised in North Carolina. He attended West Lincoln High School and then the University of North Carolina at Asheville.
