= Annie Wealthy Holland =

Educator, organization founder

- Born: 1871; Isle of Wight County, Virginia
- Died: January 6, 1934 (aged 62–63); Louisburg, NC
- Occupation: Educator
- Known for: Creating the first Negro parent-teacher association in North Carolina

Annie Wealthy Holland (1871 – January 6, 1934) was an educator and the state supervisor of "Negro" elementary schools and was the founder of the first Negro parent-teacher association in North Carolina.

== Early life and education ==
Annie Wealthy Holland was born in 1871 in Isle of Wight County, Virginia next to the plantation her grandmother worked on as a slave. Holland's parents, John Daughtry and Margaret Hill named her after Annie Wealthy of the Wealthy plantation, who had set Holland's grandfather, Friday Daughtry, free. After finishing her studies at the Isle of Wight County School, Holland's grandfather sent her to Hampton Normal and Agricultural Institute so that she could receive a higher education. However, after one year of school, Holland's grandfather's health began to fail, and so he could no longer assist her.

== Career ==
After leaving school, Holland traveled to New York City, New York where she became a nurse for William Hill. After several months her health began to fail and she was forced to return home. While at home, she was asked to take charge of a school in her county, so she took an exam to receive her second grade certificate. After teaching for two years, Holland traveled back to New York City to complete a course in dressmaking. Holland then taught for nine years. During this time she earned her second grade certificate.

In 1897, she became assistant principal of a school and in 1905 became the principal. Following this job, in 1911 Holland became the teaching supervisor in North Carolina, where her job was to make sure that African American students in Gates Country received a well-rounded education. In 1914, she became a supervisor on the Jeanes Fund board, where she served as a consultant and assistant to teachers in the North Carolina area. Later, in 1920, Holland began organizing a negro parent teacher state association, and in 1928 held the first meeting in Raleigh, NC. The organization was meant to raise the standards of home life and bring home to give every child the highest level of spiritual, mental, physical, and moral education.

== Death and legacy ==
Holland died on January 6, 1934, at age 63 while addressing a group of teachers in Louisburg, North Carolina, and was later buried in Franklin, North Carolina. On the tenth anniversary of the founding of the North Carolina Negro parent teacher association, members planted a tree in her memory at Shaw University, and named it the “Annie W. Holland tree.”
