= East Lincoln High School =

American public school in North Carolina

Location
- 6471 Highway 73; Denver, North Carolina 28037; United States; 35°27′15″N 81°01′32″W

Information
- Type: Public
- Established: 1967 (59 years ago)
- School district: Lincoln County Schools
- CEEB code: 340980
- Principal: Nate McLean
- Teaching staff: 51.69 (FTE)
- Grades: 9–12
- Enrollment: 1,090 (2023-2024)
- Student to teacher ratio: 21.09
- Colours: Orange and green
- Athletics: NCHSAA 5A
- Athletics conference: Western Foothills 4A/5A
- Mascot: Mustangs
- Website: www.lcsnc.org/o/ELHS

East Lincoln High School is a high school located in Denver, North Carolina. It is a part of the Lincoln County Schools district.

== History ==
The school was established in 1967.

== Athletics ==
East Lincoln high school is a member of the North Carolina High School Athletic Association (NCHSAA) and are classified as a 5A school. The school is a part of the Western Foothills 4A/5A Conference. The school's team name is the Mustangs and the school colors are orange and green.

=== Sporting achievements ===
The East Lincoln football team were 2A state champions in 2012 and 2AA state champions in 2014. They won the 3A state championship in 2022.

The Mustangs girls basketball team won the open class state championship in 1973. The softball team were 3A state champions in 2023.

East Lincoln's boys swim team won back-to-back 1A/2A state championships in 2006 and 2007. Both the boys and girls cross country teams have won 2A state championships, the boys in 2009 and girls in 2013.

== Notable alumni ==
- Alec Burleson, MLB outfielder and first baseman
- Keith Rodden, NASCAR crew chief
- Chazz Surratt, NFL linebacker, Super Bowl LX champion with the Seattle Seahawks
