= North Lincoln High School =

American public school in North Carolina

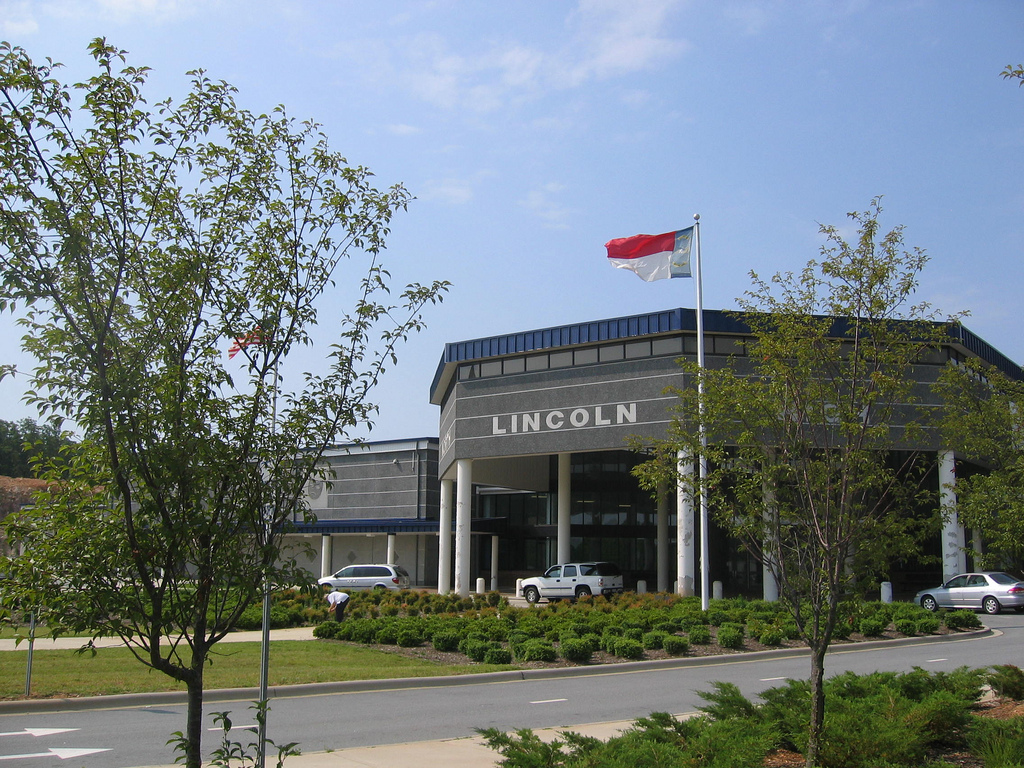
- North Lincoln High School front entrance in 2006

Location
- 2737 Lee Lawing Road; Lincolnton, North Carolina 28092; United States; 35°32′01″N 81°07′11″W

Information
- Type: Public
- Established: 2003 (23 years ago)
- School district: Lincoln County Schools
- CEEB code: 342329
- Principal: Josh Van Eseltine
- Teaching staff: 49.32 (FTE)
- Enrollment: 1,126 (2024-2025)
- Student to teacher ratio: 23.09
- Colors: Blue, black, silver
- Athletics: NCHSAA 5A
- Athletics conference: Western Foothills 4A/5A
- Mascot: Knight
- Team name: Knights
- Website: www.lcsnc.org/o/nlhs

North Lincoln High School is a high school in Lincolnton, North Carolina. It is a part of the Lincoln County Schools district. The school was established in 2003. North Lincoln's team name are the Knights, with the school colors being royal blue, silver, and black.

== History ==
North Lincoln High School opened in 2003 and became the fourth high school in the Lincoln County Schools district.

== Athletics ==
North Lincoln is a member of the North Carolina High School Athletic Association (NCHSAA) and are classified as a 5A school. The school is a part of the Western Foothills 4A/5A Conference. The school's team name is the Knights and the school colors are blue, black, and silver.

=== Sporting achievements ===
The North Lincoln cross country teams have had a history of success. The boys cross country team won back-to-back 2A state championships in 2011 and 2012. They won five straight state championships from 2017 to 2021, with the last being won as a 3A school. The North Lincoln girls cross country team have also won five straight state championships, winning from 2020 to 2024, with the last four being in the 3A class. Both the boys and girls cross country teams have also had individual state champions.

Both North Lincoln's boys and girls outdoor track and field teams won the 2A state championship in 2021, with the boys team also winning in 2019.

The Knights boys golf team won back-to-back state 2A championships in 2009 and 2010.

The North Lincoln baseball team won the class 2A baseball championship in 2019. North Lincoln rallied during the state championship games held at UNC Greensboro, winning two games to none, to claim the schools first baseball state championship.

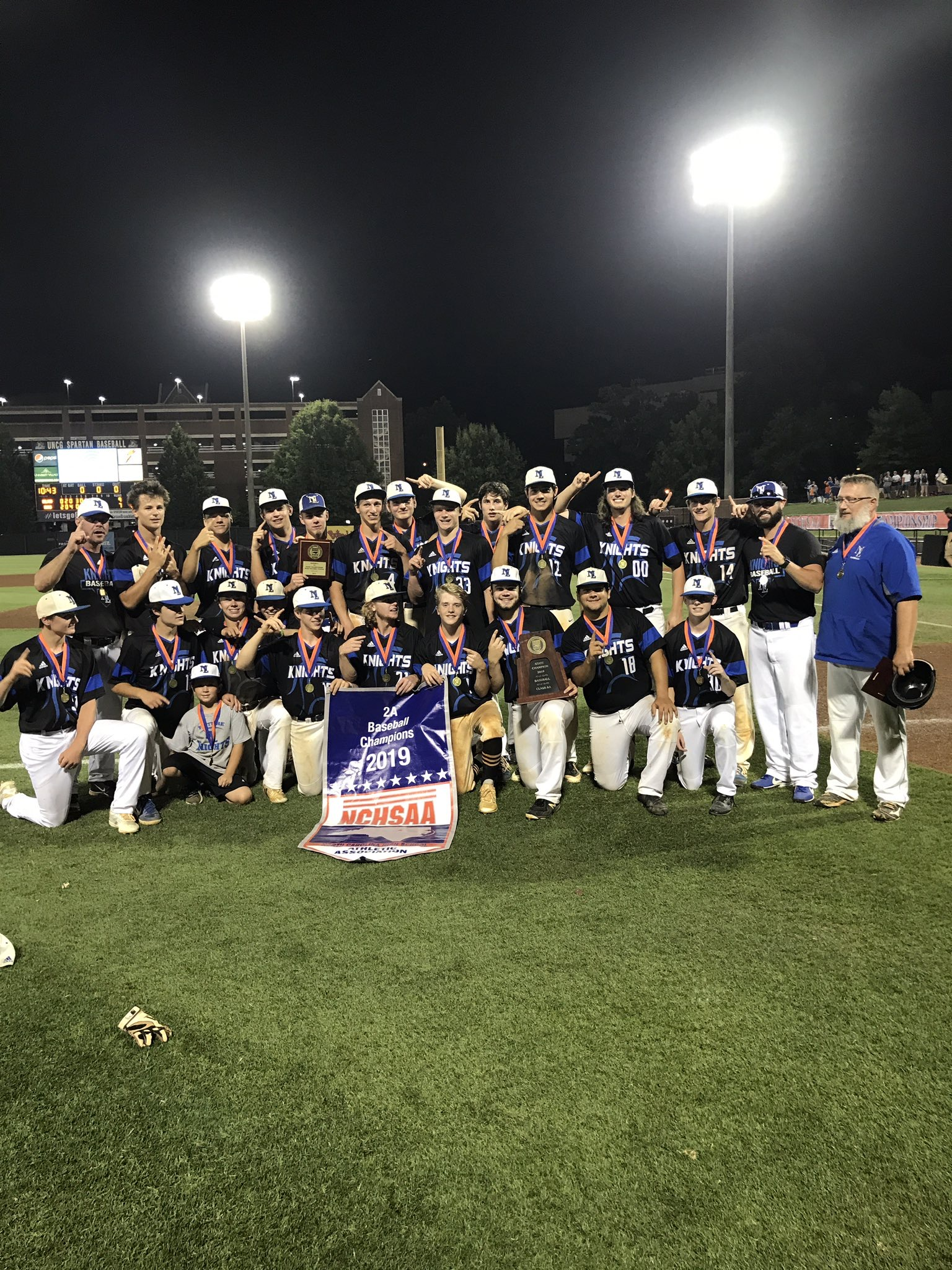
North Lincoln's baseball team after winning the 2019 NCHSAA 2A state championship

== Marching band ==
In 2009, the North Lincoln Band of Knights placed in the top 50 in the Bands of America Grand National Championships in Indianapolis, Indiana. The band has also represented the state of North Carolina on the national stage three times, at the dedication of the National WW2 Memorial in 2005 and the National Memorial Day Parade in 2013 and 2022, both in Washington D.C. It is currently under the direction of Matthew Minick, who took over from Kevin Still starting in the 2021 season. The band achieved finals for the first time in the school's history at Bands of America regional championships at Rutgers University in 2023.

In 2026 the Indoor Winds group were the WGI Winds Scholastic A Class World Championships Silver Medalists.
