= National Register of Historic Places listings in Lincoln County, North Carolina =

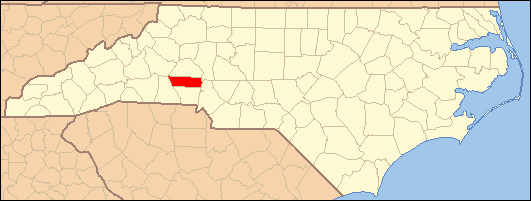

This list includes properties and districts listed on the National Register of Historic Places in Lincoln County, North Carolina. Click the "Map of all coordinates" link to the right to view an online map of all properties and districts with latitude and longitude coordinates in the table below.

== Current listings ==
This National Park Service list is complete through NPS recent listings posted May 1, 2026.

	Name on the Register	Image	Date listed	Location	City or town	Description
1	Black Ox-Duplan Corporation Mill	Black Ox-Duplan Corporation Mill	April 14, 2022 (#100007598)	215 Bonview Ave. 35°28′25″N 81°15′38″W	Lincolnton	
2	Caldwell-Cobb-Love House	Caldwell-Cobb-Love House	February 6, 1986 (#86000159)	218 E. Congress St. 35°28′08″N 81°15′13″W	Lincolnton	
3	Emanuel United Church of Christ	Emanuel United Church of Christ	December 14, 1994 (#94001453)	329 E. Main St. 35°28′22″N 81°15′11″W	Lincolnton	Built in 1913, designed by Henry E. Bonitz
4	Emmanuel Lutheran Church	Emmanuel Lutheran Church	December 14, 1994 (#94001454)	216 S. Aspen St. 35°28′11″N 81°15′26″W	Lincolnton	
5	Eureka Manufacturing Company Cotton Mill	Eureka Manufacturing Company Cotton Mill	December 18, 2013 (#13000934)	414 E. Water St. 35°28′20″N 81°15′07″W	Lincolnton	
6	First Baptist Church	First Baptist Church	December 21, 1994 (#94001456)	403 E. Main St. 35°28′24″N 81°15′09″W	Lincolnton	
7	First Presbyterian Church	First Presbyterian Church	December 14, 1994 (#94001455)	114 W. Main St. 35°28′16″N 81°15′31″W	Lincolnton	
8	First United Methodist Church	First United Methodist Church	December 14, 1994 (#94001457)	201 E. Main St. 35°28′19″N 81°15′20″W	Lincolnton	
9	William A. Graham Jr. Farm		May 6, 1977 (#77001004)	S of Denver on SR 1360; 35°28′43″N 81°04′05″W	Kidville	
10	Ingleside	Ingleside	April 13, 1972 (#72000967)	S of jct. of NC 73 and SR 1383; 35°27′49″N 81°02′39″W	Iron Station	
11	Laboratory Historic District	Laboratory Historic District	December 10, 2003 (#03001273)	Jct. of Laboratory Rd. and S. Fork Rd. 35°26′21″N 81°15′24″W	Laboratory	
12	Lincoln County Courthouse	Lincoln County Courthouse	May 10, 1979 (#79001731)	Courthouse Sq. 35°28′41″N 81°15′26″W	Lincolnton	
13	Lincolnton Commercial Historic District	Lincolnton Commercial Historic District	December 16, 2005 (#05001419)	Roughly bounded by Pine St., Poplar St., Church St. and W. Court Square; 35°28′20″N 81°15′22″W	Lincolnton	
14	Lincolnton Recreation Department Youth Center	Lincolnton Recreation Department Youth Center	December 30, 2009 (#09001178)	119 E. Pine St. 35°28′22″N 81°15′27″W	Lincolnton	Demolished 2019
15	Loretz House		March 16, 1972 (#72000969)	NW of Lincolnton off SR 1204; 35°30′48″N 81°15′53″W	Lincolnton	
16	Machpelah Presbyterian Church		December 29, 2025 (#100012448)	226 Brevard Place Road; 35°27′55″N 81°05′24″W	Iron Station	
17	Madison-Derr Iron Furnace		January 10, 2019 (#100003299)	Address Restricted	Pumpkin Center vicinity	
18	Magnolia Grove		March 16, 1972 (#72000968)	Jct. of SR 1309 and 1313; 35°25′03″N 81°10′26″W	Iron Station	Boundaries increased on June 27, 1997
19	Methodist Church Cemetery	Methodist Church Cemetery	December 14, 1994 (#94001458)	Western corner of the junction of S. Aspen and W. Congress Sts. 35°28′05″N 81°15′22″W	Lincolnton	
20	Mount Welcome		September 13, 1991 (#91001413)	Jct. of NC 1511 and NC 1412; 35°25′45″N 81°03′13″W	Lowesville	
21	Old White Church Cemetery	Old White Church Cemetery	December 14, 1994 (#94001459)	Jct. of S. Aspen and Church Sts., E corner 35°28′11″N 81°15′21″W	Lincolnton	
22	Pleasant Retreat Academy	Pleasant Retreat Academy	May 29, 1975 (#75001277)	129 E. Pine St. 35°28′20″N 81°15′22″W	Lincolnton	
23	Reinhardt-Craig House, Kiln and Pottery Shop	Reinhardt-Craig House, Kiln and Pottery Shop	January 9, 2008 (#07001376)	3171 Cat Square Rd. 35°33′47″N 81°25′46″W	Vale	
24	Rock Spring Camp Ground	Rock Spring Camp Ground	September 22, 1972 (#72000970)	6831 Campground Rd. 35°32′25″N 81°01′40″W	Denver	
25	Salem Union Church and Cemetery		October 4, 1995 (#95001118)	Jct. of NC 1005 (Startown Rd.) and NC 1274 (Maiden-Salem Rd.), SE corner 35°32′51″N 81°15′54″W	Maiden	
26	Andrew Seagle Farm		February 24, 1975 (#75001278)	N of Reepsville off SR 1205; 35°31′10″N 81°20′46″W	Reepsville	
27	Shadow Lawn	Shadow Lawn	March 24, 1972 (#72000971)	301 W. Main St. 35°28′13″N 81°15′36″W	Lincolnton	
28	South Aspen Street Historic District	South Aspen Street Historic District	January 15, 2003 (#02001713)	500-1000 blocks S. Aspen St., 114-130 E. Rhodes St., and 624-636 W. Park Dr. 35°27′53″N 81°15′16″W	Lincolnton	
29	St. Luke's Church and Cemetery	St. Luke's Church and Cemetery	January 14, 1992 (#91001914)	303-321 N. Cedar St., 322 E. McBee St. 35°28′27″N 81°15′13″W	Lincolnton	
30	Tucker's Grove Camp Meeting Ground		October 18, 1972 (#72000972)	N of Iron Station off SR 1360; 35°28′03″N 81°05′00″W	Iron Station	
31	Vesuvius Furnace		August 13, 1974 (#74001359)	On SR 1382, N of NC 73; 35°29′31″N 81°05′00″W	Catawba Springs	
32	West Main Street Historic District	West Main Street Historic District	January 15, 2003 (#02001716)	200-300 W. Main St. and 114 N. High St. 35°28′15″N 81°15′32″W	Lincolnton	
33	Woodside		March 7, 1973 (#73001357)	W of jct. of U.S. 182 and 27; 35°27′15″N 81°16′42″W	Lincolnton	

== See also ==
- National Register of Historic Places listings in North Carolina
- List of National Historic Landmarks in North Carolina
