= Mount Welcome =

The name Mount Welcome or Mt Welcome, may refer to several geographical places.

== Mountains/hills ==
- The original name of Mount Sir Mackenzie Bowell, British Columbia
- A hill overlooking the town of Roebourne, Western Australia
  - Mount Welcome Station a pastoral lease and homestead (Mount Welcome House), established in 1864
- Mount Welcome (Queensland), a peak in the Flinders Peak Group in Queensland, Australia
- Welcome Mountain, a peak in the Usarp Mountains of Antarctica

== Other places ==
- Mount Welcome (residence), a historic residence in Lincoln County, North Carolina, which is listed by the US National Register of Historic Places
