= Lowesville, North Carolina =

- Census-designated place
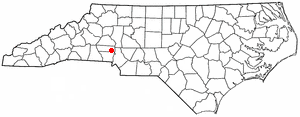
- Location of Lowesville, North Carolina
- Coordinates: 35°25′09″N 81°0′0″W
- Country: United States
- State: North Carolina
- County: Lincoln

Area
  - Total: 6.80 sq mi (17.62 km^{2})
  - Land: 6.80 sq mi (17.60 km^{2})
  - Water: 0.0077 sq mi (0.02 km^{2})
- Elevation: 761 ft (232 m)

Population (2020)
  - Total: 3,281
  - Density: 482.9/sq mi (186.43/km^{2})
- Time zone: UTC-5 (Eastern (EST))
  - Summer (DST): UTC-4 (EDT)
- FIPS code: 37-39520
- GNIS feature ID: 2403244

Lowesville is a census-designated place (CDP) in Lincoln County, North Carolina, United States. As of the 2020 census, Lowesville had a population of 3,281.

== History ==
Mount Welcome was listed on the National Register of Historic Places in 1991.

== Geography ==
Lowesville is located in the southeast corner of Lincoln County. It is bordered to the south by Gaston County. North Carolina Highway 16, a four-lane freeway, passes through the east side of the community, leading northwest 24 miles (39 km) to Newton and southeast 17 miles (27 km) to Charlotte. It is paralleled by old Highway 16 (NC-16 Business), a two-lane road that runs through the center of Lowesville. Access to new Highway 16 is only from North Carolina Highway 73 at the northern end of the CDP or from NC-16 Business in Lucia, 2 miles (3 km) south of the center of Lowesville. NC 73 forms the northern edge of the CDP; it leads east 9 miles (14 km) to Interstate 77 in northern Huntersville and west 15 miles (24 km) to Lincolnton, the Lincoln county seat.

According to the United States Census Bureau, the Lowesville CDP has a total area of 6.8 square miles (17.6 km^{2}), of which 0.01 square miles (0.02 km^{2}), or 0.10%, are water. Killian Creek forms the western edge of the CDP, and Johnson Creek drains the eastern side of the community. The entire community is in the Catawba River watershed.

Lowesville uses the Stanley, North Carolina, 28164 ZIP code.

== Demographics ==
Historical population
Census	Pop.	Note	%±
2020	3,281		—
U.S. Decennial Census

=== 2020 census ===
As of the 2020 census, Lowesville had a population of 3,281. The median age was 43.7 years. 23.2% of residents were under the age of 18 and 20.0% of residents were 65 years of age or older. For every 100 females there were 94.1 males, and for every 100 females age 18 and over there were 90.0 males age 18 and over.

0.0% of residents lived in urban areas, while 100.0% lived in rural areas.

There were 1,272 households in Lowesville, of which 35.3% had children under the age of 18 living in them. Of all households, 62.1% were married-couple households, 10.8% were households with a male householder and no spouse or partner present, and 22.2% were households with a female householder and no spouse or partner present. About 19.4% of all households were made up of individuals and 9.8% had someone living alone who was 65 years of age or older.

There were 1,321 housing units, of which 3.7% were vacant. The homeowner vacancy rate was 1.5% and the rental vacancy rate was 0.0%.

Racial composition as of the 2020 census
Race	Number	Percent
White	2,834	86.4%
Black or African American	161	4.9%
American Indian and Alaska Native	11	0.3%
Asian	32	1.0%
Native Hawaiian and Other Pacific Islander	1	0.0%
Some other race	47	1.4%
Two or more races	195	5.9%
Hispanic or Latino (of any race)	130	4.0%

=== 2000 census ===
As of the 2000 census, there were 1,440 people, 552 households, and 422 families residing in the CDP. The population density was 211.4 inhabitants per square mile (81.6/km^{2}). There were 589 housing units at an average density of 86.5 per square mile (33.4/km^{2}). The racial makeup of the CDP was 92.29% White, 6.53% African American, 0.21% Native American, 0.83% Asian, and 0.14% from two or more races. Hispanic or Latino of any race were 1.60% of the population.

There were 552 households, out of which 34.8% had children under the age of 18 living with them, 64.5% were married couples living together, 8.9% had a female householder with no husband present, and 23.4% were non-families. 19.7% of all households were made up of individuals, and 8.2% had someone living alone who was 65 years of age or older. The average household size was 2.61 and the average family size was 2.99.

In the CDP, the population was spread out, with 24.3% under the age of 18, 7.5% from 18 to 24, 33.3% from 25 to 44, 25.3% from 45 to 64, and 9.6% who were 65 years of age or older. The median age was 36 years. For every 100 females, there were 99.7 males. For every 100 females age 18 and over, there were 99.3 males.

The median income for a household in the CDP was $51,333, and the median income for a family was $53,000. Males had a median income of $36,316 versus $24,280 for females. The per capita income for the CDP was $28,072. About 5.9% of families and 7.3% of the population were below the poverty line, including 8.8% of those under age 18 and 10.7% of those age 65 or over.
