= Pleasant Retreat Academy =

Historic school building in North Carolina, United States

- U.S. National Register of Historic Places
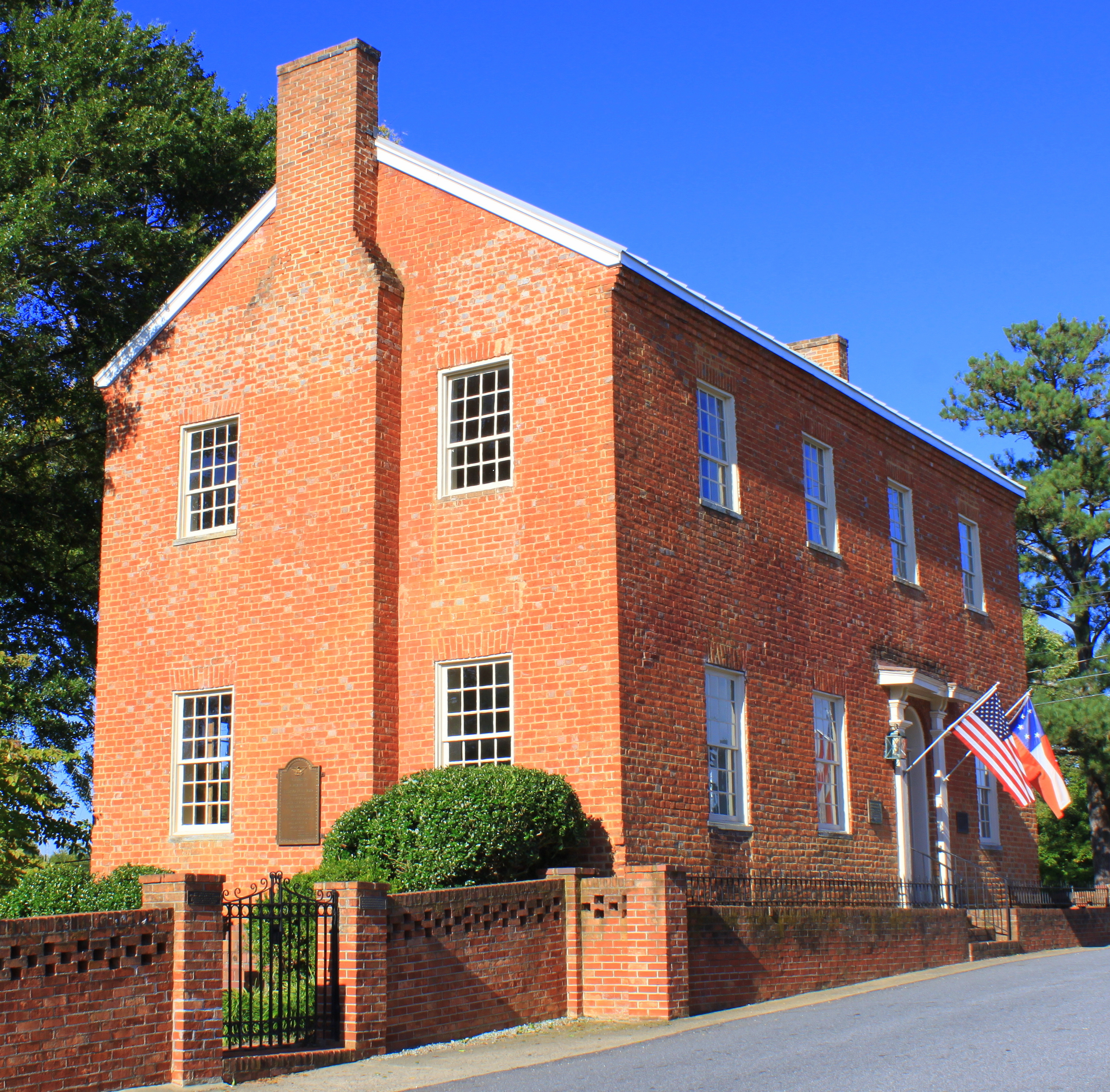
- Pleasant Retreat Academy, September 2014

- Location within North Carolina Location within the United States
- Location: 129 East Pine Street, Lincolnton, North Carolina
- Coordinates: 35°28′20″N 81°15′22″W
- Area: 2 acres (0.81 ha)
- Built: 1817-1820
- Architectural style: Federal
- NRHP reference No.: 75001277
- Added to NRHP: May 29, 1975

Pleasant Retreat Academy is a historic building located at 129 East Pine Street, Lincolnton, North Carolina.

== History ==
Pleasant Retreat Academy was built between 1817 and 1820, and is a two-story brick building, four bays wide and two deep, on a low fieldstone foundation in a restrained Federal style. It has a gable roof and a partially exposed, single-shoulder chimney on each gable end. The school remained in operation until about 1878. It later housed a private residence, private school, and the Lincoln County Public Library until 1965. It was listed on the National Register of Historic Places in 1975.

== Former pupils ==
- William Graham (1804–1875), American politician
- James Henderson (1808–1858), American politician
- Robert Hoke (1837–1912), Confederate States Army general
- Hoke Smith (1855–1931), American politician
- William Marcus Shipp, Attorney General of North Carolina and a state legislator

== See also ==
- National Register of Historic Places listings in Lincoln County, North Carolina
- United Daughters of the Confederacy
