= Laboratory Historic District =

Historic district in North Carolina, United States

- U.S. National Register of Historic Places
- U.S. Historic district
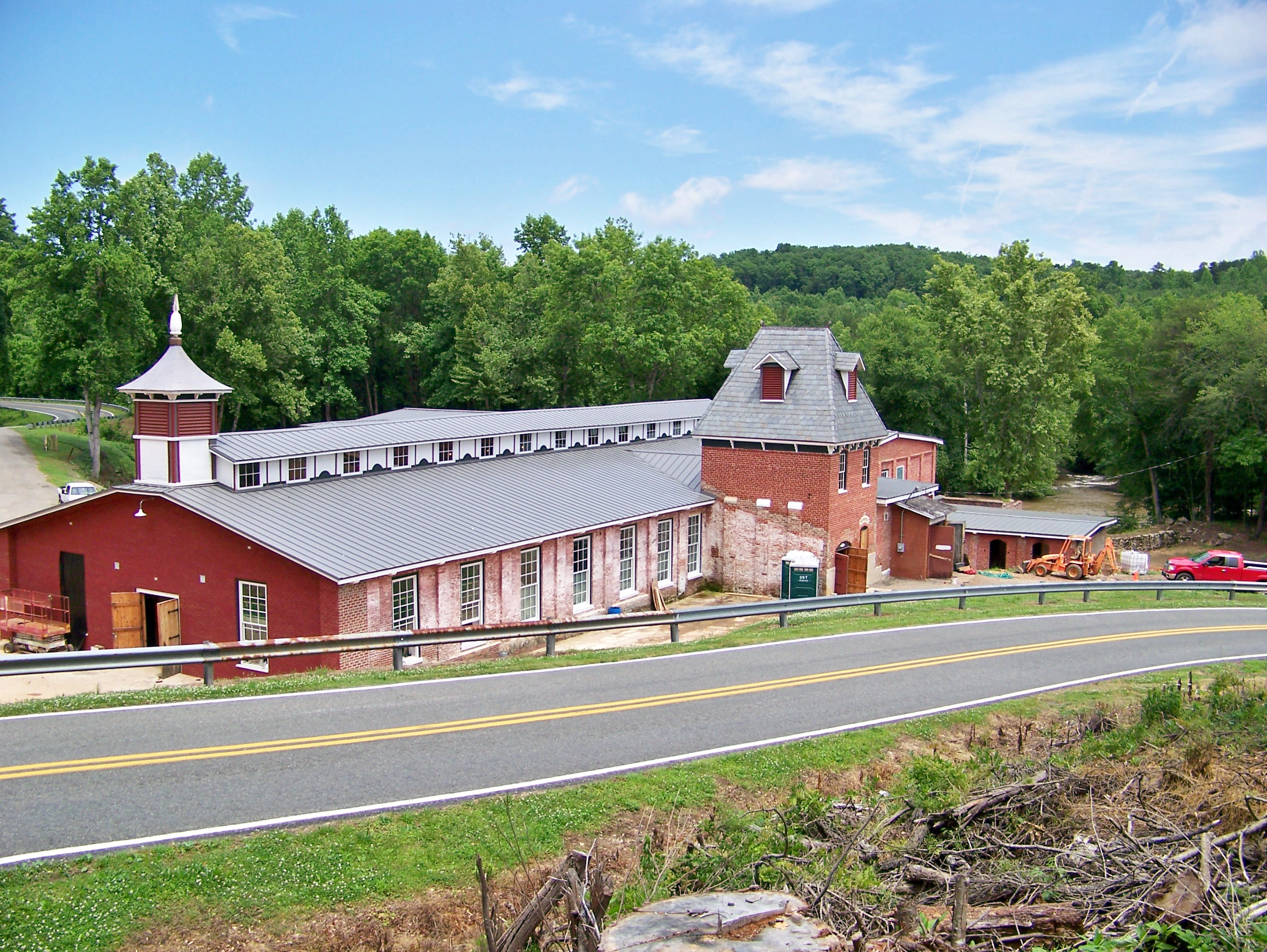

- Location within North Carolina Location within the United States
- Location: Jct. of Laboratory Rd. and S. Fork Rd., Laboratory, North Carolina
- Coordinates: 35°26′21″N 81°15′24″W
- Area: 21.5 acres (8.7 ha)
- Built: 1844
- Architectural style: Federal, Greek Revival
- NRHP reference No.: 03001273
- Added to NRHP: December 10, 2003

Laboratory Historic District is a national historic district located at Laboratory, Lincoln County, North Carolina. It encompasses seven contributing buildings and two contributing structures associated with the Laboratory Cotton Mill and its founder and owner, Daniel E. Rhyne. They include the Laboratory Cotton Mill (1887), the Laboratory Cotton Mill Reservoir (c. 1887), the Daniel E. Rhyne House (1894), and the Federal / Greek Revival style Hoke-Rhyne House (c. 1844). The mill closed in the late 1990s.

It was listed on the National Register of Historic Places in 2003.
