= Madison-Derr Iron Furnace =

Historic site located in Pumpkin Center, North Carolina

- U.S. National Register of Historic Places
- Location: Pumpkin Center, North Carolina
- Built: 1809
- NRHP reference No.: 100003299
- Added to NRHP: 01/10/2019

The Madison-Derr Iron Furnace is a historic site located in Pumpkin Center, North Carolina.

== History ==
The cold-blast iron furnace was built in 1809 by Peter Forney, a Revolutionary War officer and Congressman. The furnace smelted local ores and produced pig and cast iron. It was rebuilt in 1855. Iron production was stopped in 1861 by the Civil War. The industry never recovered post-war, leading to the furnace's decline in the early 1870s. Today, little remains of the furnace; it stands at about 30 feet tall. It was added to the National Register of Historic Places on January 10, 2019.
