= Maxton Historic District =

Historic district in North Carolina, United States

- U.S. National Register of Historic Places
- U.S. Historic district
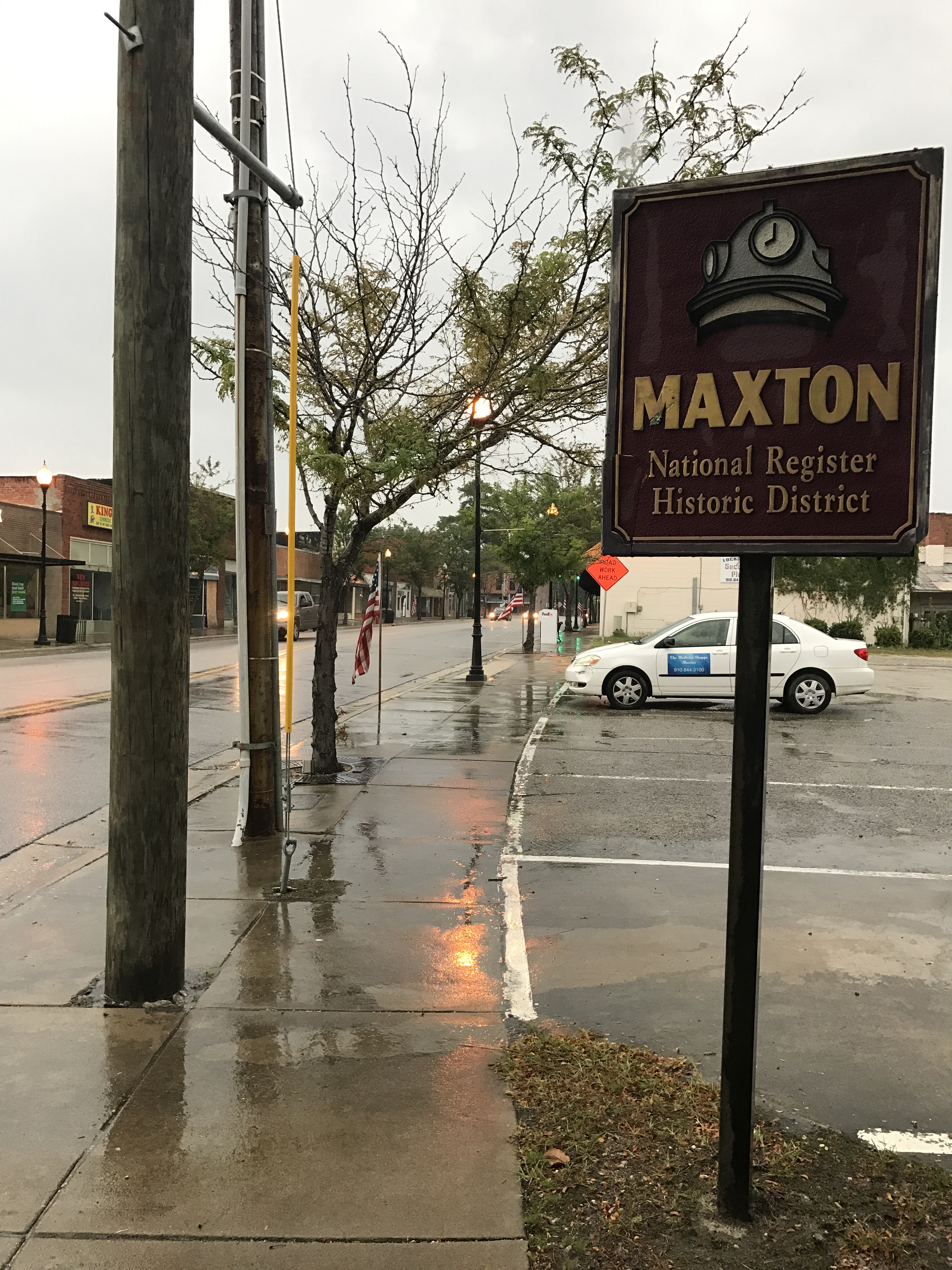

- Location within North Carolina Location within the United States
- Location: Roughly bounded by Graham St., Martin Luther King Dr., McCaskill St., and Florence St., Maxton, North Carolina
- Coordinates: 34°44′15″N 79°20′57″W
- Area: 21 acres (8.5 ha)
- Built: 1884
- Architect: Parrish, Clint; Bonitz, Henry E.
- Architectural style: Early Commercial, Classical Revival
- NRHP reference No.: 99000199
- Added to NRHP: February 12, 1999

Maxton Historic District is a national historic district located at Maxton, Robeson County, North Carolina. The district encompasses 49 contributing buildings in the central business district and surrounding residential sections of Maxton. It includes buildings built between about 1884 to 1948 in a variety of popular architectural styles including Classical Revival. Notable buildings include the Cape Fear and Yadkin Valley (CF&YV) Railroad Freight Warehouse (c. 1884), Maxton Union Station (1913), Seaboard Air Line Railroad warehouse and office (c. 1915), First Presbyterian Church (1906), St. Paul's Methodist Episcopal Church (1906) designed by architect Henry E. Bonitz, Gilbert Patterson Law Office (c. 1885), A.J. MacKinnon House, and the R.L. MacLeod House.

It was added to the National Register of Historic Places in 1999.
