= Connie Guion =

American professor of medicine (1882 – 1971)

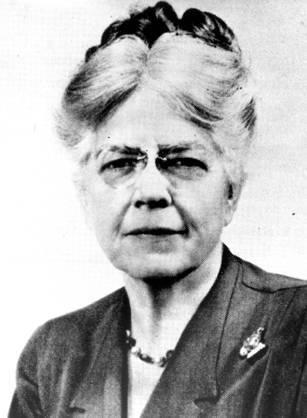
- Connie Myers Guion
- Born: August 29, 1882; River Bend Plantation near Lincolnton, North Carolina, U.S.
- Died: April 30, 1971 (aged 88); New York City, U.S.
- Education: Miss Kate Shipp's School; Wellesley College
- Occupation: Physician

Connie Myers Guion (August 29, 1882 – April 30, 1971) was an American professor of medicine. She was influential in developing health care systems for the poor in New York City and training programs for new health care professionals at Cornell Medical Center. She founded the Cornell Pay Clinic, which supported the poor in the city and brought in training. She was the first woman to be named professor of clinical medicine, and in 1963 became the first living woman physician to have a building named after her (New York Hospital's Connie Guion Building). Up until her death, she made many house calls and ran her own private clinic.

== Early life ==
Connie Guion was born in River Bend Plantation near Lincolnton, North Carolina, on August 29, 1882. She was the ninth child of Benjamin Simmons and Catherine Coatesworth Caldwell Guion and had eleven siblings. She was raised by a father who worked as a railroad executive and farmer, and three of her sisters grew up to become nurses.

In 1892, her family moved to Charlotte, North Carolina, where she attended public school. She later attended Miss Kate Shipp's School in Lincolnton from 1898 to 1900, and Northfield School for Girls in East Northfield, Massachusetts from 1900 to 1902. Guion earned a B.A. degree from Wellesley College in 1906, where she had enrolled on scholarship. She then became a chemistry instructor at Vassar College (1906–1908) and a professor and head of the chemistry department at Sweet Briar College (1908-1913). She earned her M.A. in biochemistry in 1913 with a thesis entitled "Purine Metabolism of the Raccoon, the Opossum and the Rat" and earned her M.D. in 1917 from Cornell University Medical College graduating first in her class.

== Medical career ==
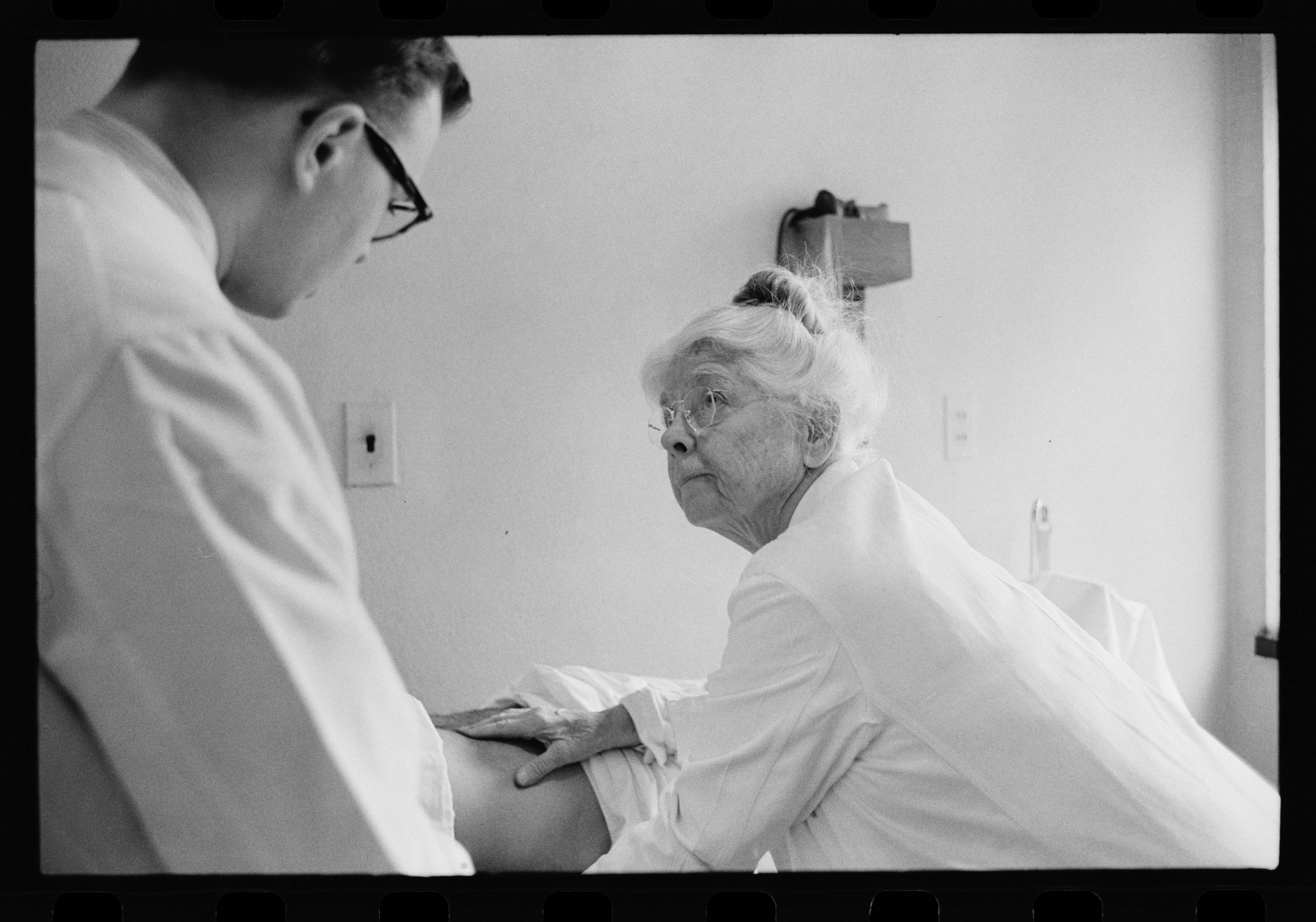
Guion examining a patient in 1961

During Guion's medical internship and residency at Second Medical Cornell Division at Bellevue Hospital from 1917 to 1919, she and her peers were working 24-hour ambulatory shifts. Guion rebelled against the 24-hour shifts even after being told that the practice had been fostered for 100 years and was reported to have said, "Well, the century's up." Soon after, a 12-hour shift schedule was adopted by the hospital.

Guion helped create the Cornell Pay Clinic in 1922 to provide affordable and attentive care for the New York City community. She became chief of the Clinic in 1929 which later became the Outpatient Department of the New York Hospital-Cornell Medical Center and was the chief until she retired in 1953.

== Awards and recognition ==
Guion received many promotions, awards, and honorary degrees for her dedication to medicine and community. In 1932, Guion became chief of the General Medical Clinic while serving as an associate professor of clinical medicine at Cornell University. In 1946, she was promoted to full professor, making her the United States' first woman to be appointed professor of clinical medicine.

In 1951, Guion received the Northfield Award for significant service from the Northfield Schools. She was also the first woman elected honorary governor of the Society of the New York Hospital in 1952. That same year, Guion initiated a new curriculum for fourth-year medical students, which required that they treat and closely monitor specific patients for months at a time. For this initiative, Guion was honored with the annual award of distinction from the Cornell University Medical College Alumni Association. In 1954, she was named Medical Woman of the Year by the American Medical Women's Association.

In 1963, the New York Hospital-Cornell Medical Center erected the Connie Guion Building, making her the first female physician to have a hospital building named after her during her lifetime. The following year, Sweet Briar College erected the Connie Guion Science Building. In addition to these achievements, Guion held honorary degrees from Wellesley College (1950), the Woman's Medical College of Pennsylvania (1953), Queens College of Charlotte, N.C. (1957), and The University of North Carolina (1965). She also received the Jane Addams Medal from Rockford College in 1963.

== Personal life ==
Guion never married to a man but had a long term partnership with Ruth Smith, a PE teacher she likely met at Wellesley. She was a member of both the Episcopal church and the Republican party. She died on April 30, 1971, at the age of 88. No funeral service was planned, and her body was cremated. A memorial service was held at St. Bartholomew's Episcopal Church.

== Publications ==
Hunter, A., Givens, M. H., & Guion, C. M. (1914). Studies in the biochemistry of purine metabolism I. The excretion of purine catabolites in the urine of marsupials, rodents and Carnivora. Journal of Biological Chemistry, 18(3), 387-401.
