= Bank of Onslow and Jacksonville Masonic Temple =

Historic buildings in North Carolina, United States

- U.S. National Register of Historic Places
- U.S. Historic district
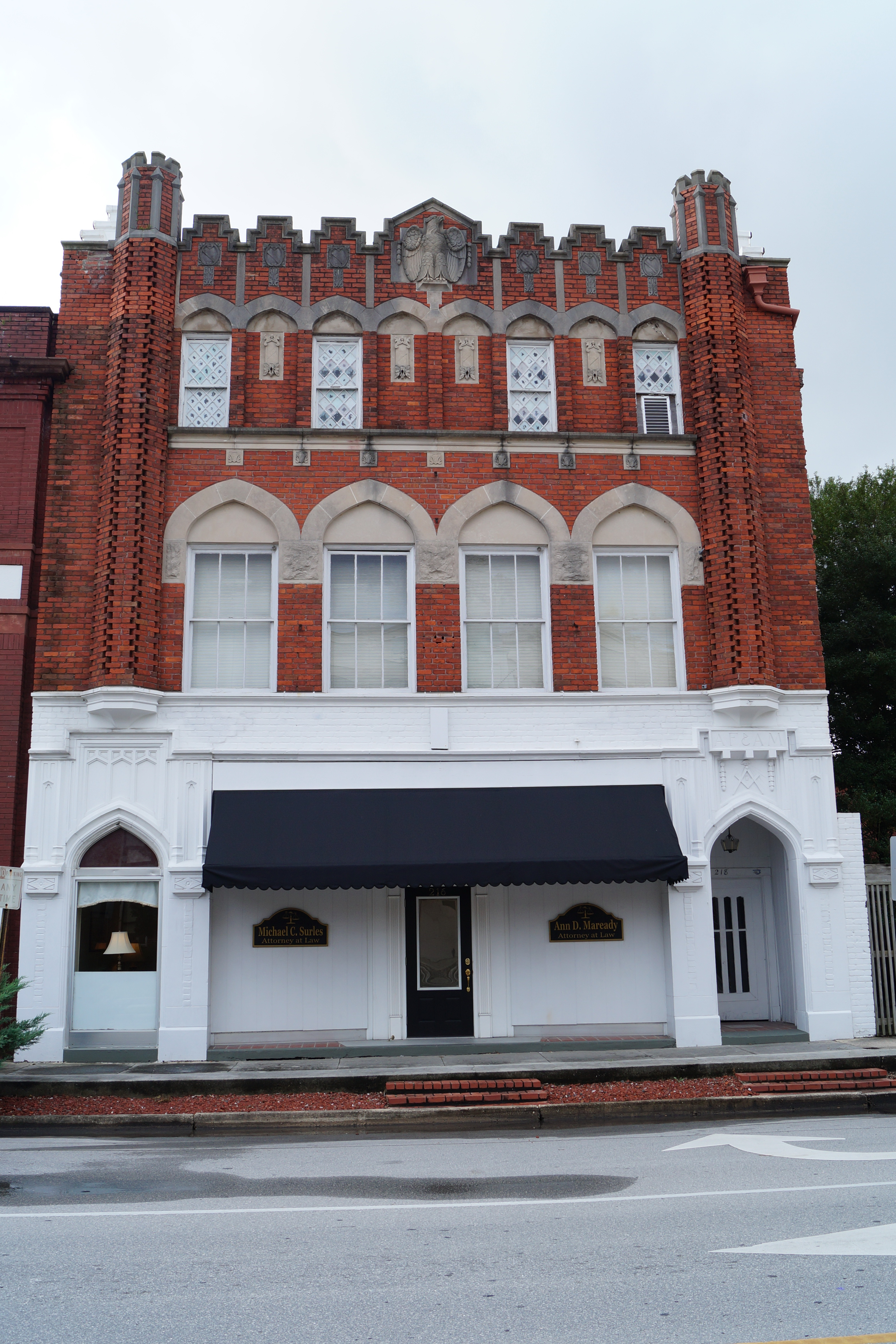
- Bank of Onslow and Jacksonville Masonic Temple, September 2014

- Location within North Carolina Location within the United States
- Location: 214-216 Old Bridge St., Jacksonville, North Carolina
- Coordinates: 34°45′2″N 77°25′54″W
- Area: 0.1 acres (0.040 ha)
- Built: 1916
- Built by: Crumpler Brothers
- Architect: Bonitz, Henry E.
- Architectural style: Beaux Arts, Tudor Revival
- MPS: Onslow County MPS
- NRHP reference No.: 89001850
- Added to NRHP: November 13, 1989

The Bank of Onslow and the Jacksonville Masonic Temple are two adjoining historic buildings located at 214 and 216 Old Bridge Street, in Jacksonville, Onslow County, North Carolina. The buildings are in the Beaux Arts architecture and Tudor Revival architecture, and were constructed in 1916, and 1919 respectively. They were jointly listed on the National Register of Historic Places in 1989 as a national historic district.

The Masonic Temple was originally constructed by La Fayette Lodge No. 83, A. F. & A. M. and served as their meeting hall until 1955 (when the lodge moved to new premises).
