= Henry E. Bonitz =

American architect

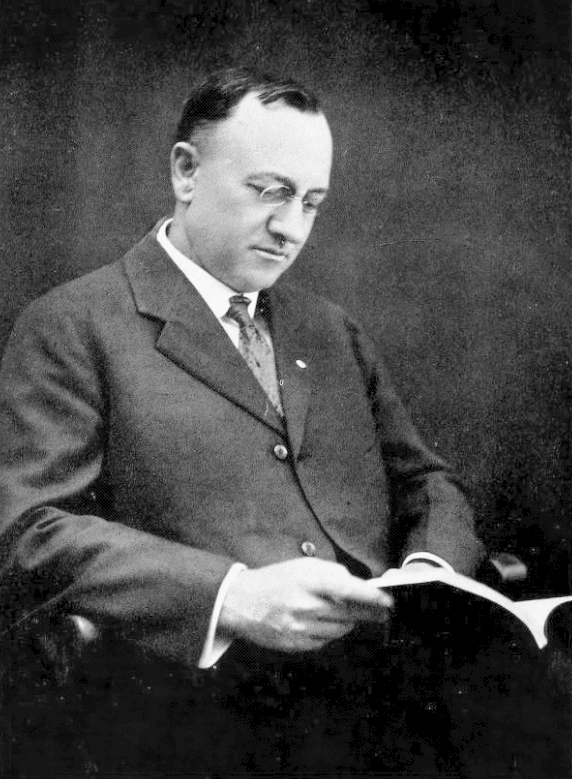
- Born: Henry Emil Bonitz; April 16, 1872; Goldsboro, North Carolina
- Died: March 27, 1921 (aged 48); Wilmington, North Carolina
- Education: State College of Agriculture and Engineering
- Occupation: Architect
- Spouse: Kate C. Burnett (m. 1898)

Signature
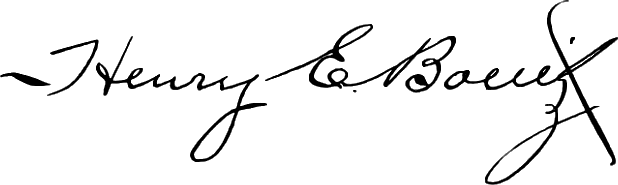

Henry Emil Bonitz (1872–1921) was an American architect.

== Biography ==
Bonitz was born on April 16, 1872, in Goldsboro, North Carolina, to John Henry William and Mary Elise Bonitz, both of whom were German-born. Henry Bonitz was educated in Goldsboro and then at the Bradley School in Wilmington. In 1889, he was one of the first dozen students to enroll in the State College of Agriculture and Engineering at Raleigh (later North Carolina State University) and graduated from there in 1893.

Bonitz married the former Kate C. Burnett on January 9, 1898. He died after an operation on March 27, 1921, at James Walker Memorial Hospital in Wilmington.

== Career ==
In 1893, Bonitz began working for architect James F. Post in Wilmington, opening his own business the following year. His first offices were in the Bonitz Hotel which his father ran.

A number of his works are listed on the U.S. National Register of Historic Places.

Works include:

- Bank of Onslow and Jacksonville Masonic Temple, 214-216 Old Bridge St., Jacksonville, North Carolina (Bonitz, Henry E.), NRHP-listed
- Emanuel United Church of Christ, 329 E. Main St., Lincolnton, North Carolina (Bonitz, Henry E.), NRHP-listed
- One or more works in Laurinburg Commercial Historic District, roughly bounded by Church, Atkinson, Biggs Sts. and the Laurinburg and Southern RR, Laurinburg, North Carolina (Bonitz, Henry E.), NRHP-listed
- One or more works in Maxton Historic District, roughly bounded by Graham St., Martin Luther King Dr., McCaskill St., and Florence St., Maxton, North Carolina (Bonitz, Henry E.), NRHP-listed
