= Methodist Church Cemetery =

Historic cemetery in North Carolina, United States

- U.S. National Register of Historic Places
- U.S. Historic district
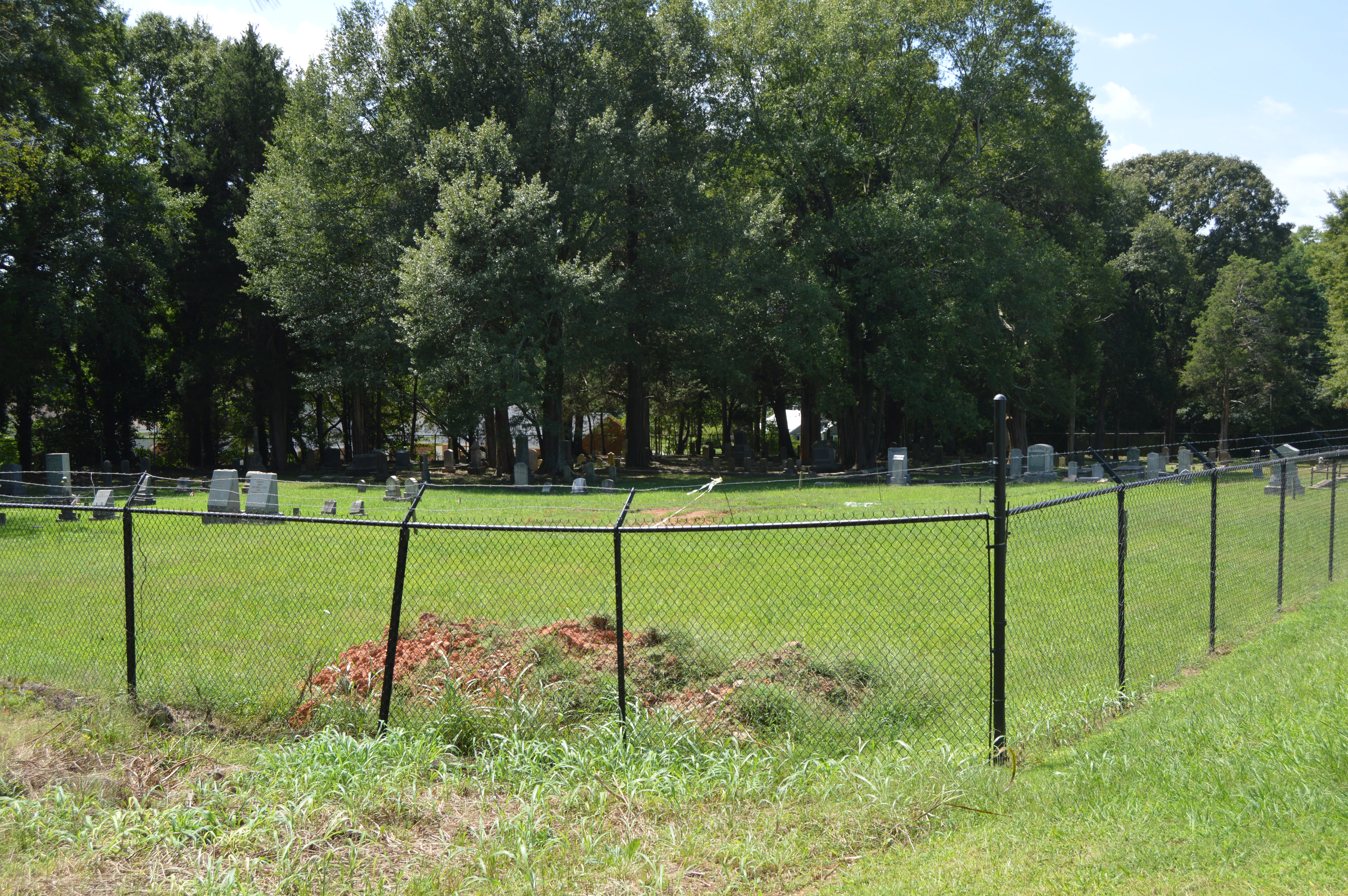
- Overview from northeast

- Location within North Carolina Location within the United States
- Location: Western corner of the junction of S. Aspen and W. Congress Sts., Lincolnton, North Carolina
- Coordinates: 35°28′4″N 81°15′23″W
- Area: 2 acres (0.81 ha)
- Built: 1828
- MPS: Churches and Church-Related Cemeteries in Lincolnton MPS
- NRHP reference No.: 94001458
- Added to NRHP: December 14, 1994

Methodist Church Cemetery is a historic Methodist cemetery and national historic district located at Lincolnton, Lincoln County, North Carolina. It was established about 1828, and contains the marked graves of some 275 members of the Methodist church, or citizens of Lincolnton. The gravestones include notable examples of 19th and early-20th century funerary art. The property was also the site of Lincolnton's Methodist churches and religious worship from about 1822 until 1920.

It was listed on the National Register of Historic Places in 1994.
