= Shadow Lawn (Lincolnton, North Carolina) =

Historic house in North Carolina, United States

- U.S. National Register of Historic Places
- U.S. Historic district – Contributing property
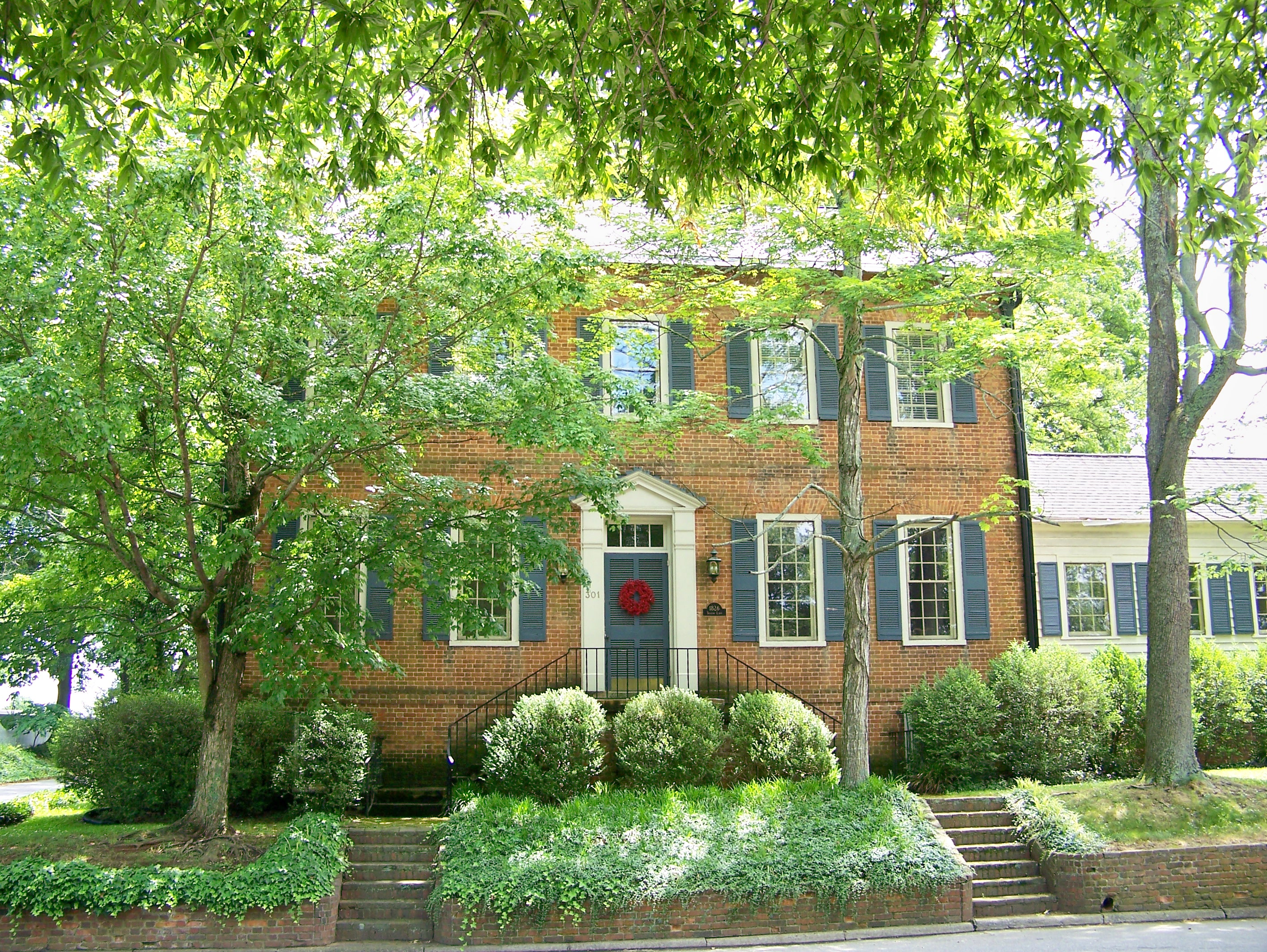

- Location within North Carolina Location within the United States
- Location: 301 W. Main St., Lincolnton, North Carolina
- Coordinates: 35°28′13″N 81°15′36″W
- Area: 0.3 acres (0.12 ha)
- Built: 1826
- Architectural style: Federal
- NRHP reference No.: 72000971
- Added to NRHP: March 24, 1972

Shadow Lawn is a historic home located at Lincolnton, Lincoln County, North Carolina. It was built in 1826, and is a two-story, five-bay by two-bay, Federal-style brick mansion. It has a gable roof, is set on a full basement, and features three exterior end chimneys. It was the home of Congressman Charles R. Jonas (1904–1988), who purchased the property in 1935.

It was listed on the National Register of Historic Places in 1972. It is located in the West Main Street Historic District.
