= West Main Street Historic District (Lincolnton, North Carolina) =

Historic district in North Carolina, United States

- U.S. National Register of Historic Places
- U.S. Historic district
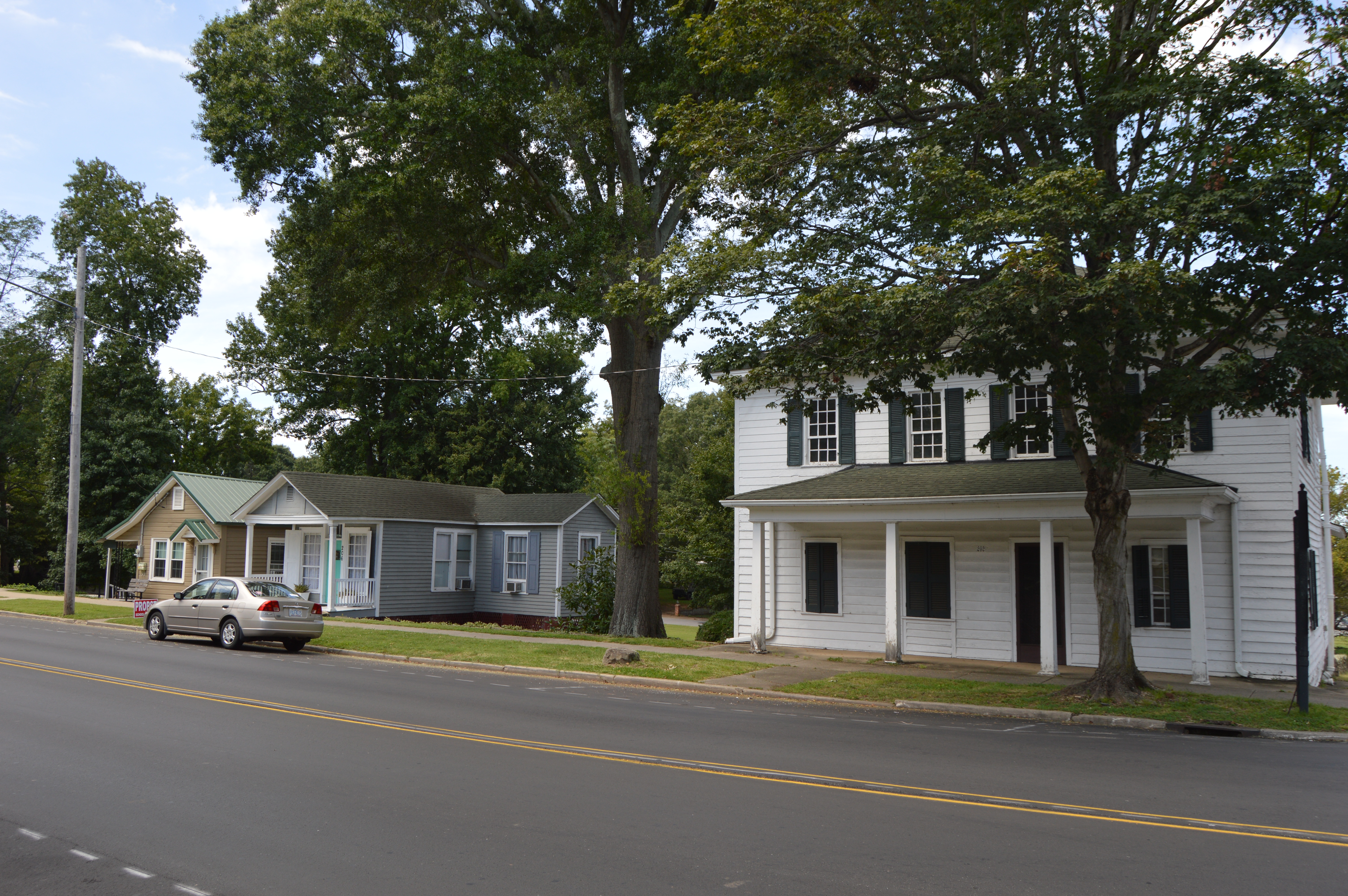
- Eastern section of the district, with the Michal-Butt-Brown-Pressly House at right

- Location within North Carolina Location within the United States
- Location: 200-300 W. Main St. and 114 N. High St., Lincolnton, North Carolina
- Coordinates: 35°28′13″N 81°15′37″W
- Area: 11 acres (4.5 ha)
- Built: 1819
- Architectural style: Federal, Greek Revival, Colonial Revival
- NRHP reference No.: 02001716
- Added to NRHP: January 15, 2003

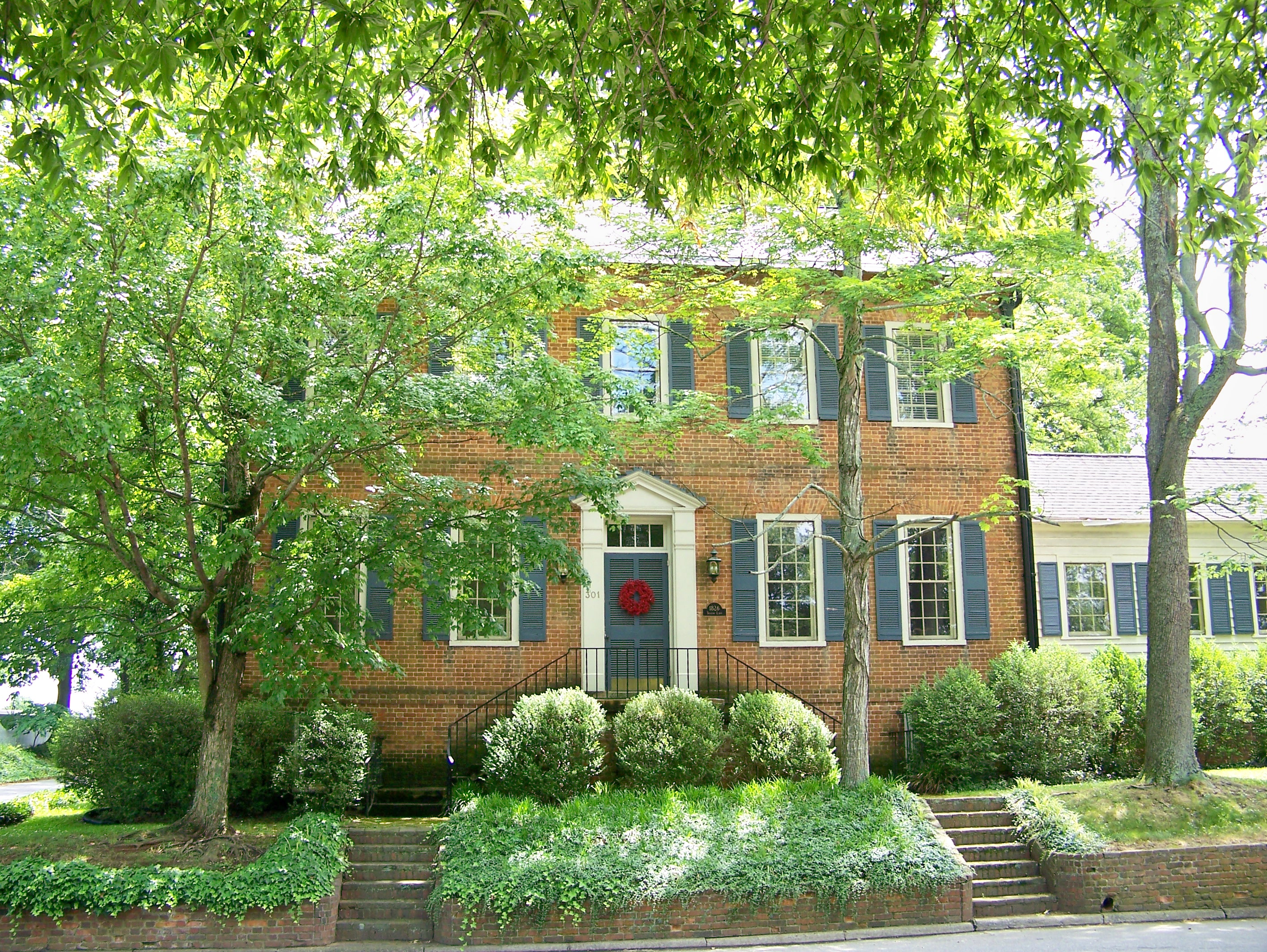
Shadow Lawn, 2013

West Main Street Historic District is a national historic district located at Lincolnton, Lincoln County, North Carolina. It encompasses 18 contributing buildings in a predominantly residential section of Lincolnton. It includes notable examples of Federal, Greek Revival and Colonial Revival style architecture dating between about 1819 and 1941. Located in the district is the separately listed Shadow Lawn. Other notable buildings include the Michal-Butt-Brown-Pressly House (c. 1819), William H. Michal House (c. 1854), Rouser-Hildebrand-Burgin House (c. 1842), Robert Steve Reinhardt House (c. 1925), and Charles Hoover, Jr., House (c. 1941).

It was listed on the National Register of Historic Places in 2003.
