= Old White Church Cemetery =

Historic cemetery in North Carolina, United States

- U.S. National Register of Historic Places
- U.S. Historic district
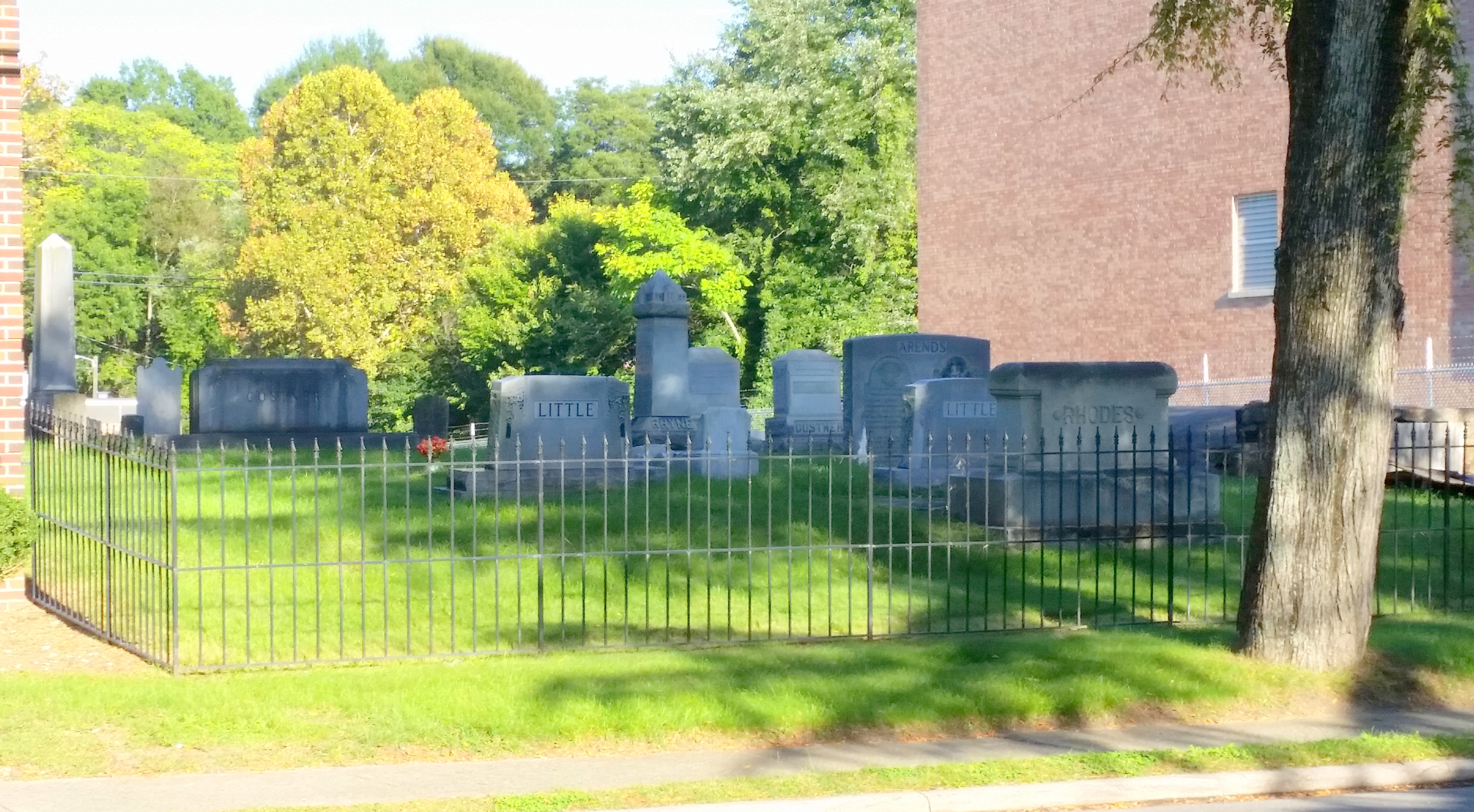
- Old White Church Cemetery, September 2014

- Location within North Carolina Location within the United States
- Location: Jct. of S. Aspen and Church Sts., E corner, Lincolnton, North Carolina
- Coordinates: 35°28′11″N 81°15′21″W
- Area: less than one acre
- Built: 1801
- MPS: Churches and Church-Related Cemeteries in Lincolnton MPS
- NRHP reference No.: 94001459
- Added to NRHP: December 14, 1994

Old White Church Cemetery, also known as Emanuel Church Cemetery, is a historic cemetery and national historic district located at Lincolnton, Lincoln County, North Carolina. It was established in 1788, and contains the marked graves of some 265 citizens of Lincolnton, with an even larger number of unmarked graves. The oldest marked grave dates to 1801. The gravestones include notable examples of 19th and early-20th century funerary art. It is the oldest burying ground in the town of Lincolnton.

It was listed on the National Register of Historic Places in 1994.
