= Lincolnton Commercial Historic District =

Historic district in North Carolina, United States

- U.S. National Register of Historic Places
- U.S. Historic district
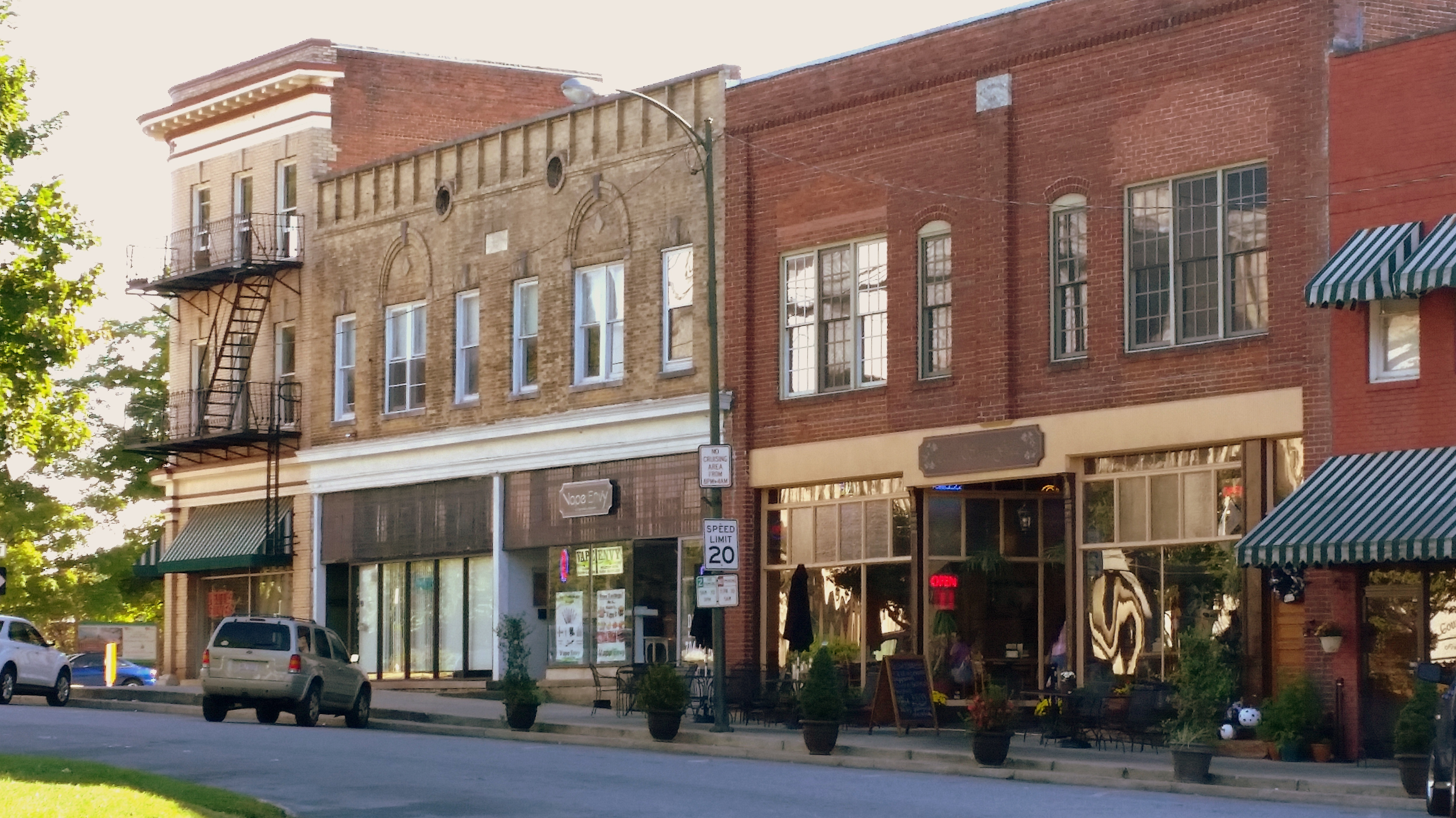
- Lincolnton Commercial Historic District, September 2014

- Location within North Carolina Location within the United States
- Location: Roughly bounded by Pine St., Poplar St., Church St. and W. Court Square, Lincolnton, North Carolina
- Coordinates: 35°28′20″N 81°15′22″W
- Area: 22 acres (8.9 ha)
- Built: 1923
- Architect: Salter, James A; et al.
- Architectural style: Classical Revival, Early Commercial, et al.
- NRHP reference No.: 05001419
- Added to NRHP: December 16, 2005

Lincolnton Commercial Historic District is a national historic district located at Lincolnton, Lincoln County, North Carolina. It encompasses 62 contributing buildings and 2 contributing objects in the central business district of Lincolnton. It includes a variety of commercial, institutional, and industrial buildings dating between about 1900 and 1955. Located in the district are the separately listed Classical Revival style Lincoln County Courthouse and First United Methodist Church. Other notable buildings include the Frank Beal House (c. 1910), Karl L. Lawing House (c. 1905), Reinhardt Building, Carolina First National Bank, Central Candy and Cigar Company, Jonas Building (c. 1950), Wampum Department Stores (c. 1905), Rhodes and Corriher Company building, and Coca-Cola Bottling Company building.

It was listed on the National Register of Historic Places in 2005.
