= Emanuel United Church of Christ (Lincolnton, North Carolina) =

Historic church in North Carolina, United States

- U.S. National Register of Historic Places
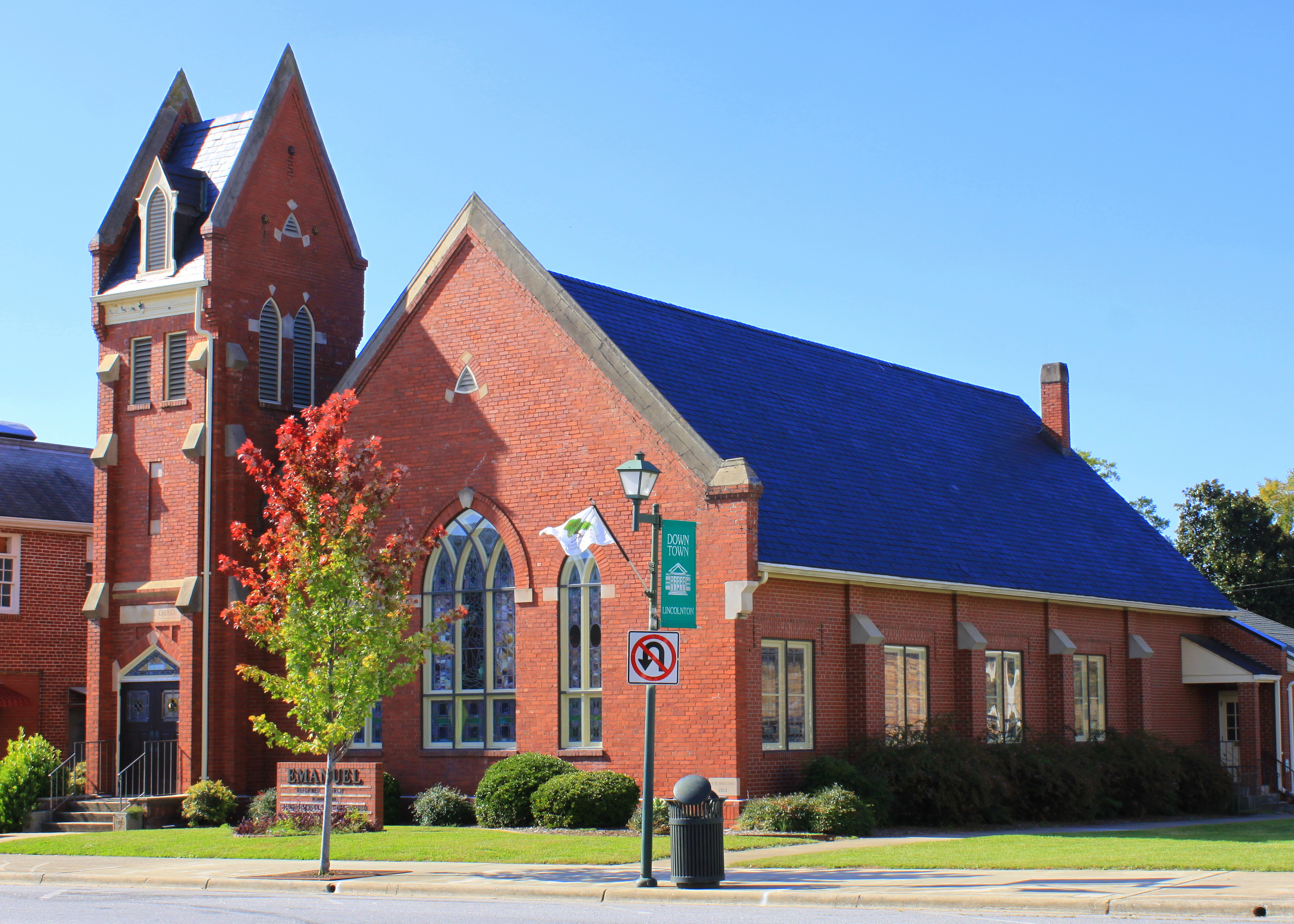

- Location within North Carolina Location within the United States
- Location: 329 E. Main St., Lincolnton, North Carolina
- Coordinates: 35°28′22″N 81°15′11″W
- Area: less than one acre
- Built: 1913
- Architect: Bonitz, Henry E.; et al.
- Architectural style: Late Gothic Revival
- MPS: Churches and Church-Related Cemeteries in Lincolnton MPS
- NRHP reference No.: 94001453
- Added to NRHP: December 14, 1994

The Emanuel United Church of Christ, also known as Emanuel Reformed Church, is a historic United Church of Christ church building located at 329 E. Main St. in Lincolnton, Lincoln County, North Carolina. It was designed by Henry E. Bonitz and built in 1913. It is a rectangular Late Gothic Revival-style red-orange brick church with a four-stage corner tower. It features cast cement detailing, lancet arched windows, and buttresses with cement caps.

It was listed on the National Register of Historic Places in 1994.
