= Emmanuel Lutheran Church (Lincolnton, North Carolina) =

Historic church in North Carolina, United States

- U.S. National Register of Historic Places
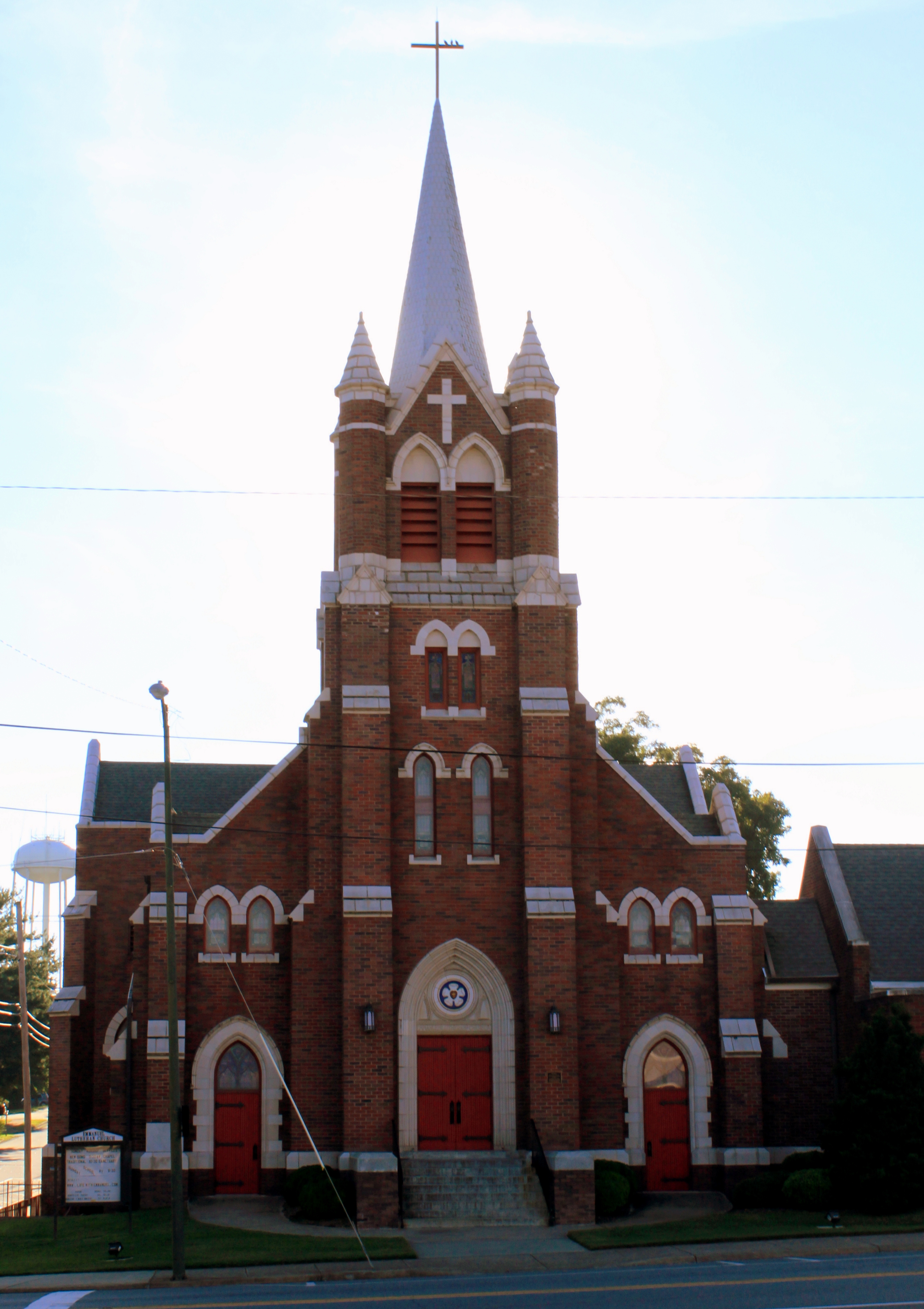

- Location within North Carolina Location within the United States
- Location: 216 S. Aspen St., Lincolnton, North Carolina
- Coordinates: 35°28′11″N 81°15′26″W
- Area: less than one acre
- Built: 1919
- Architect: Marsh & Hawkins; et al.
- Architectural style: Late Gothic Revival
- MPS: Churches and Church-Related Cemeteries in Lincolnton MPS
- NRHP reference No.: 94001454
- Added to NRHP: December 14, 1994

Emmanuel Lutheran Church is a historic Lutheran church building located at 216 S. Aspen Street in Lincolnton, Lincoln County, North Carolina. It was built in 1919, and is a rectangular Late Gothic Revival-style brick church with a four-stage central tower with a conical steeple. It features pale beige terra cotta, cast stone, granite, and poured cement detailing; lancet arched door and window openings; and stepped buttresses.

It was listed on the National Register of Historic Places in 1994.
