= St. Luke's Church and Cemetery =

Historic site in Lincoln County, North Carolina, US

- U.S. National Register of Historic Places
- U.S. Historic district
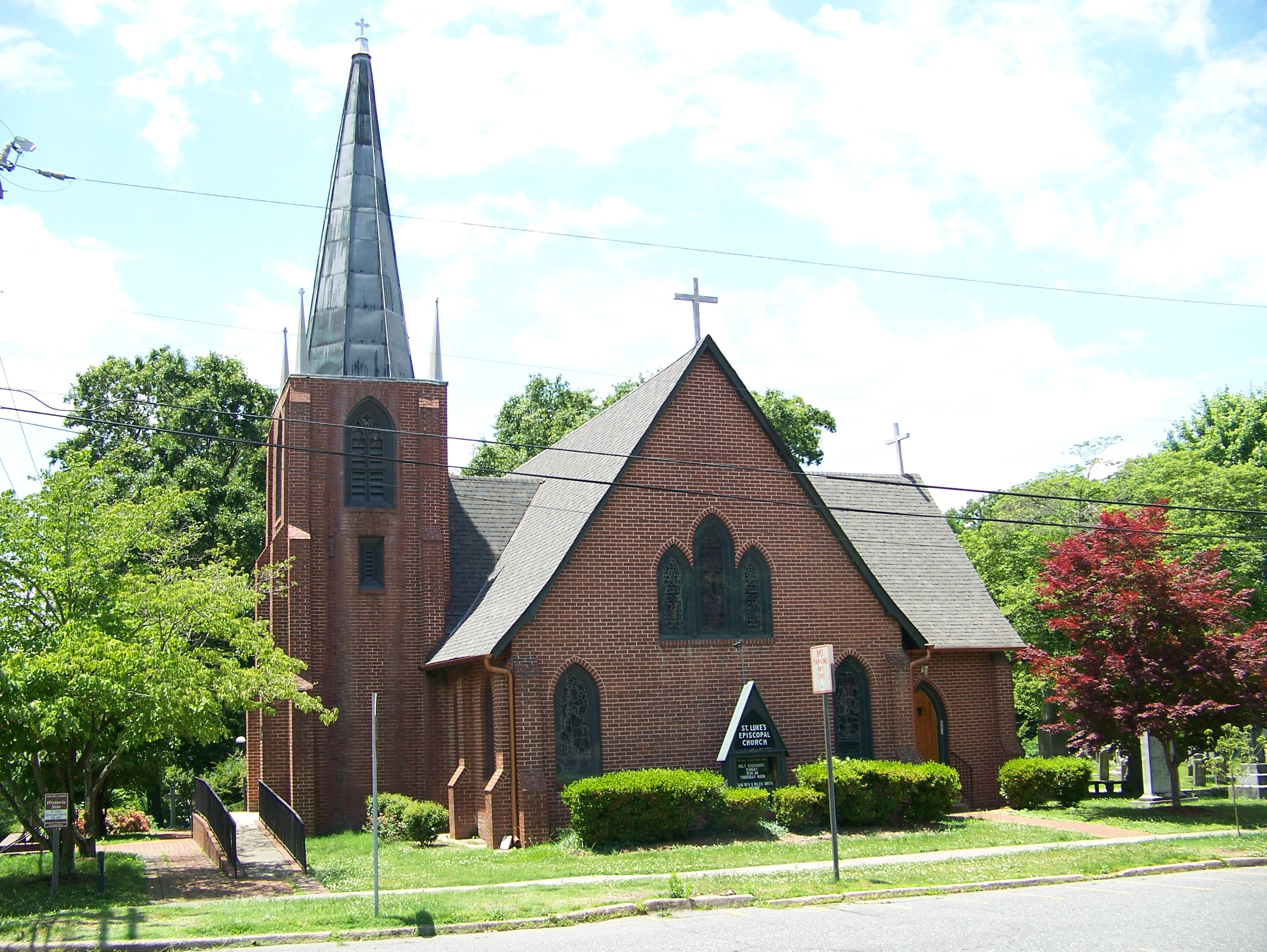

- Location within North Carolina Location within the United States
- Location: 303-321 N. Cedar St., 322 E. McBee St., Lincolnton, North Carolina
- Coordinates: 35°28′27″N 81°15′13″W
- Area: 2.2 acres (0.89 ha)
- Built: 1854; 1886; 1907–12
- Architect: McBee, Silas; Motz, W. W.
- Architectural style: Colonial Revival, Late Gothic Revival
- NRHP reference No.: 91001914
- Added to NRHP: January 14, 1992

St. Luke's Episcopal Church and Cemetery is a historic Episcopal church complex, cemetery, and national historic district located at 303-321 N. Cedar Street, 322 E. McBee Street in Lincolnton, Lincoln County, North Carolina. The complex includes the church, parish hall, and rectory. The church was built in 1885–1886, and is a Late Gothic Revival-style frame structure with a brick veneer added in 1922–1923. The tower is believed to date to 1859. The parish hall was built in 1907, and is a one-story, rectangular frame building. The rectory was built in 1911–1912, and is a two-story, "T"-form Colonial Revival-style dwelling with a pebbledash finish. The cemetery includes approximately 300 gravestones, with the earliest dating to 1854.

It was listed on the National Register of Historic Places in 1992.
