= South Aspen Street Historic District =

Historic district in North Carolina, United States

- U.S. National Register of Historic Places
- U.S. Historic district
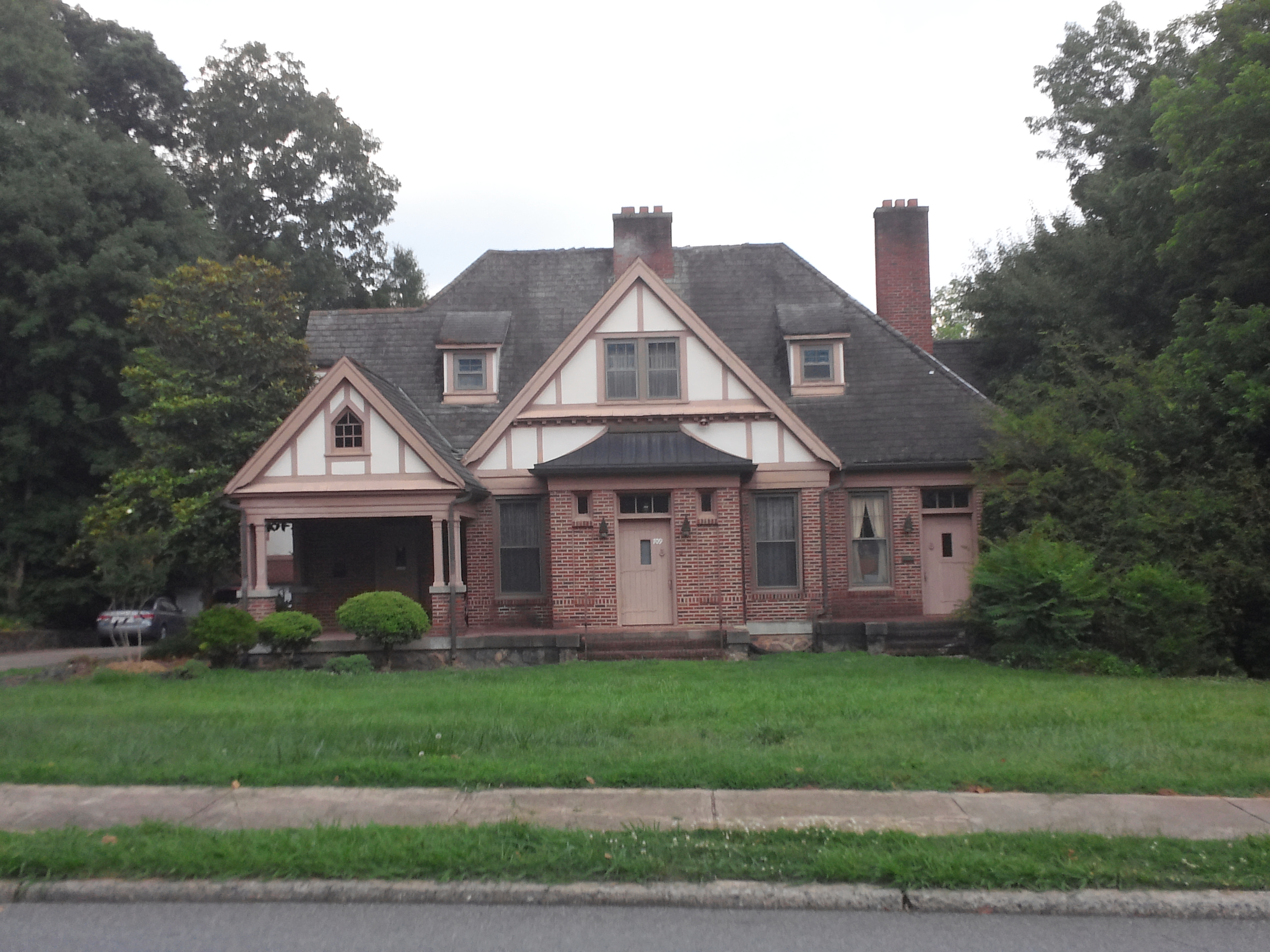
- Dr. Lester A. Crowell Jr. House

- Location within North Carolina Location within the United States
- Location: 500-1000 blocks S. Aspen St., 114-130 E. Rhodes St., and 624-636 W. Park Dr., Lincolnton, North Carolina
- Coordinates: 35°27′53″N 81°15′16″W
- Area: 36 acres (15 ha)
- Built: 1852
- Architectural style: Greek Revival, Queen Anne
- NRHP reference No.: 02001713
- Added to NRHP: January 15, 2003

South Aspen Street Historic District is a national historic district in Lincolnton, Lincoln County, North Carolina. It encompasses 46 contributing buildings and one contributing structure in a predominantly residential section of town. It includes examples of Greek Revival and Queen Anne style architecture dating between about 1852 and 1950. Buildings include the Wallace H. Alexander House (1852), Banett-Hoyle House (1852), the former Lincoln/Gordon Crowell Memorial Hospital, the former Lincolnton High School, John M. Rhodes House, the David P. Rhodes House, the C. William Rhodes House, and the John D. Abernathy House.

It was listed on the National Register of Historic Places in 2003.
