= Woodside (Lincolnton, North Carolina) =

Historic house in North Carolina, United States

- U.S. National Register of Historic Places
- Location within North Carolina Location within the United States
- Location: W of jct. of U.S. 182 and 27, near Lincolnton, North Carolina
- Coordinates: 35°27′15″N 81°16′42″W
- Area: 0.5 acres (0.20 ha)
- Built: c. 1798
- Architectural style: Federal
- NRHP reference No.: 73001357
- Added to NRHP: March 7, 1973

Woodside, also known as the James Pinckney Henderson House, is a historic plantation house located near Lincolnton, Lincoln County, North Carolina. It was built about 1798, and is a two-story, four bay by three bay, Federal style brick dwelling with a Quaker plan interior. It has a gable roof, is set on a random granite foundation, and features three single-shouldered exterior end chimneys. It was built by Lawson Henderson and is believed to be the birthplace of his son Texas political leader James Pinckney Henderson (1808–1858).

It was listed on the National Register of Historic Places in 1973.
