= Lincolnton Recreation Department Youth Center =

- U.S. National Register of Historic Places
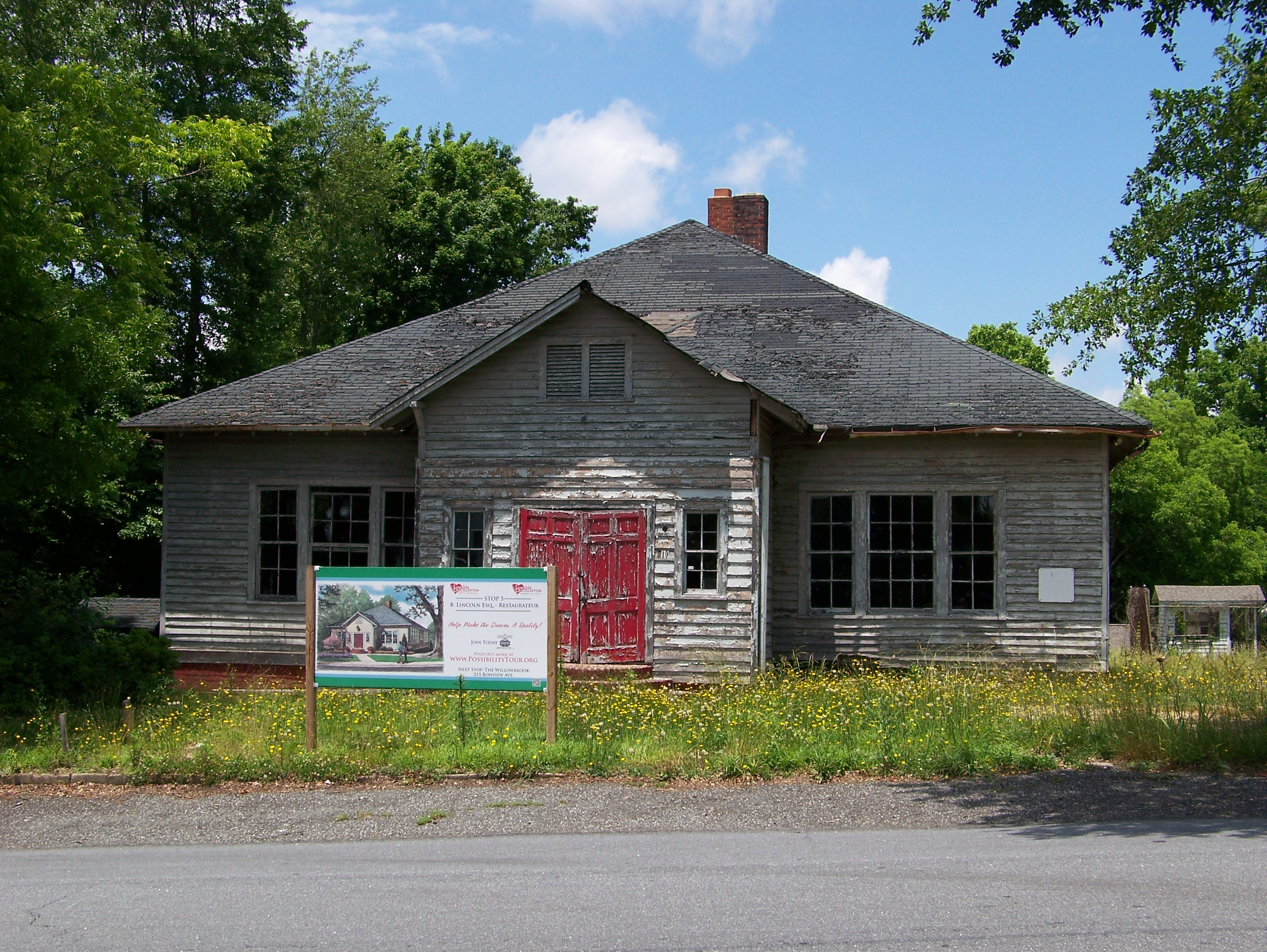

- Location within North Carolina Location within the United States
- Location: 119 E. Pine St., Lincolnton, North Carolina
- Coordinates: 35°28′23″N 81°15′25″W
- Area: less than one acre
- Built: c. 1921, 1947
- Architectural style: Bungalow/craftsman
- NRHP reference No.: 09001178
- Added to NRHP: December 30, 2009

Lincolnton Recreation Department Youth Center was a historic clubhouse building located at Lincolnton, Lincoln County, North Carolina. It was built as a temporary school about 1921 and renovated and enlarged in 1947. It was a single-story wood-frame building with a truncated hipped roof in the Bungalow / American Craftsman style. It sat on an exposed basement at the rear, with brick, asphalt, and wood as its basic materials. The Center continued to function until 1989, but was demolished in August, 2019.

It was listed on the National Register of Historic Places in 2009.
