= First Presbyterian Church (Lincolnton, North Carolina) =

Historic church in North Carolina, United States

- U.S. National Register of Historic Places
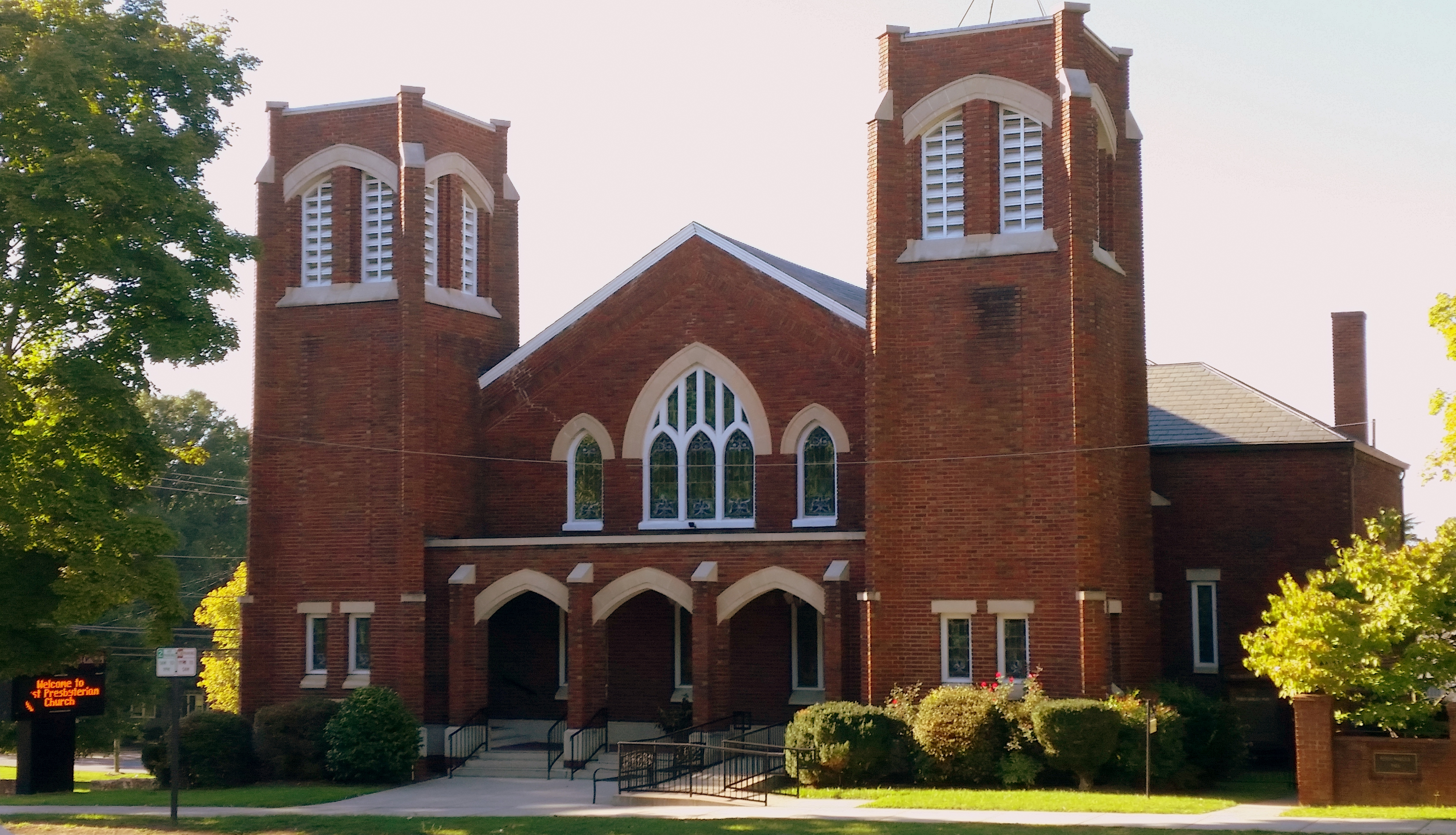

- Location within North Carolina Location within the United States
- Location: 114 W. Main St., Lincolnton, North Carolina
- Coordinates: 35°28′16″N 81°15′31″W
- Area: less than one acre
- Built: 1917
- Architectural style: Late Gothic Revival
- MPS: Churches and Church-Related Cemeteries in Lincolnton MPS
- NRHP reference No.: 94001455
- Added to NRHP: December 14, 1994

First Presbyterian Church is a historic Presbyterian church building located at 114 W. Main Street in Lincolnton, Lincoln County, North Carolina. It was built in 1917, and is a rectangular Late Gothic Revival-style brick church with projecting corner towers. It has a front gable slate roof and features shallow, cement-capped buttresses, and lancet-arch windows. The interior is a modified Akron Plan with a theater-style sanctuary and adjoining space for extra seating or Sunday school.

It was listed on the National Register of Historic Places in 1994.
