= Eureka Manufacturing Company Cotton Mill =

- U.S. National Register of Historic Places
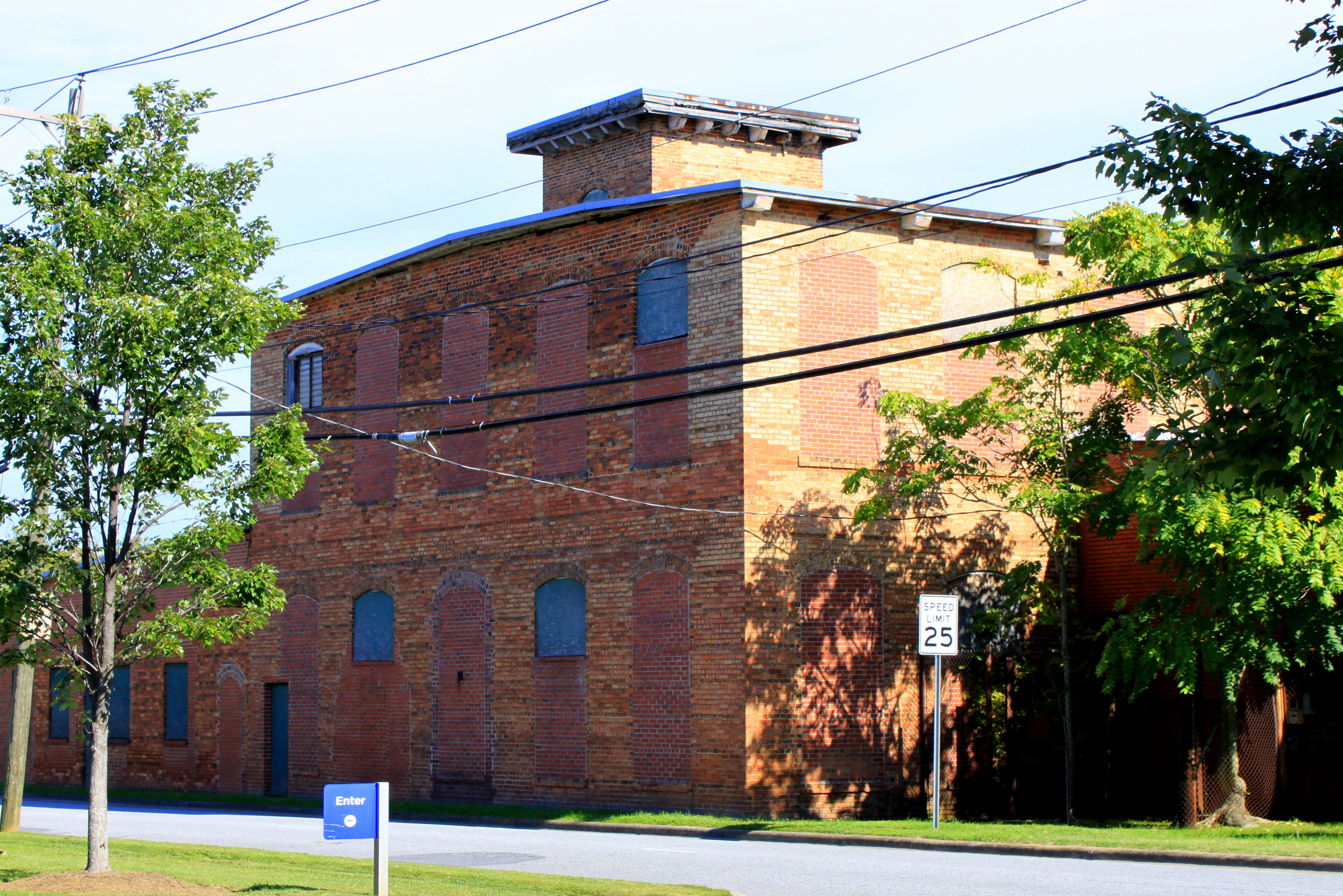
- Eureka Manufacturing Co. Cotton Mill, September 2014

- Location within North Carolina Location within the United States
- Location: 414 E. Water St., Lincolnton, North Carolina
- Coordinates: 35°28′20″N 81°15′07″W
- Area: 1.59 acres (0.64 ha)
- Built: 1907-1910
- NRHP reference No.: 13000934
- Added to NRHP: December 18, 2013

Eureka Manufacturing Company Cotton Mill, also known as Tait Yarn Company and Lincoln Bonded Warehouse Company, is a historic cotton mill located at Lincolnton, Lincoln County, North Carolina. It was built between 1907 and 1910, and is a two-story, brick factory building with a three-story stair tower. Adjacent to the factory is a two-story brick office building built between 1902 and 1906. The buildings housed the Eureka Manufacturing Company from 1906 to 1937, and Tait Yarn Company from 1949 to 1966. Lincoln Bonded Warehouse occupied the buildings into the late-1990s. The buildings were previously owned by the Lincoln County Historical Association. Between 2020 and 2025, the mill was occupied by Bricktree Brewing. Ben Brooks purchased the building in August 2025 and is currently renovating the space for a 2026 re-opening to the public.

It was listed on the National Register of Historic Places in 2013.
