= Caldwell-Cobb-Love House =

Historic house in North Carolina, United States

- U.S. National Register of Historic Places
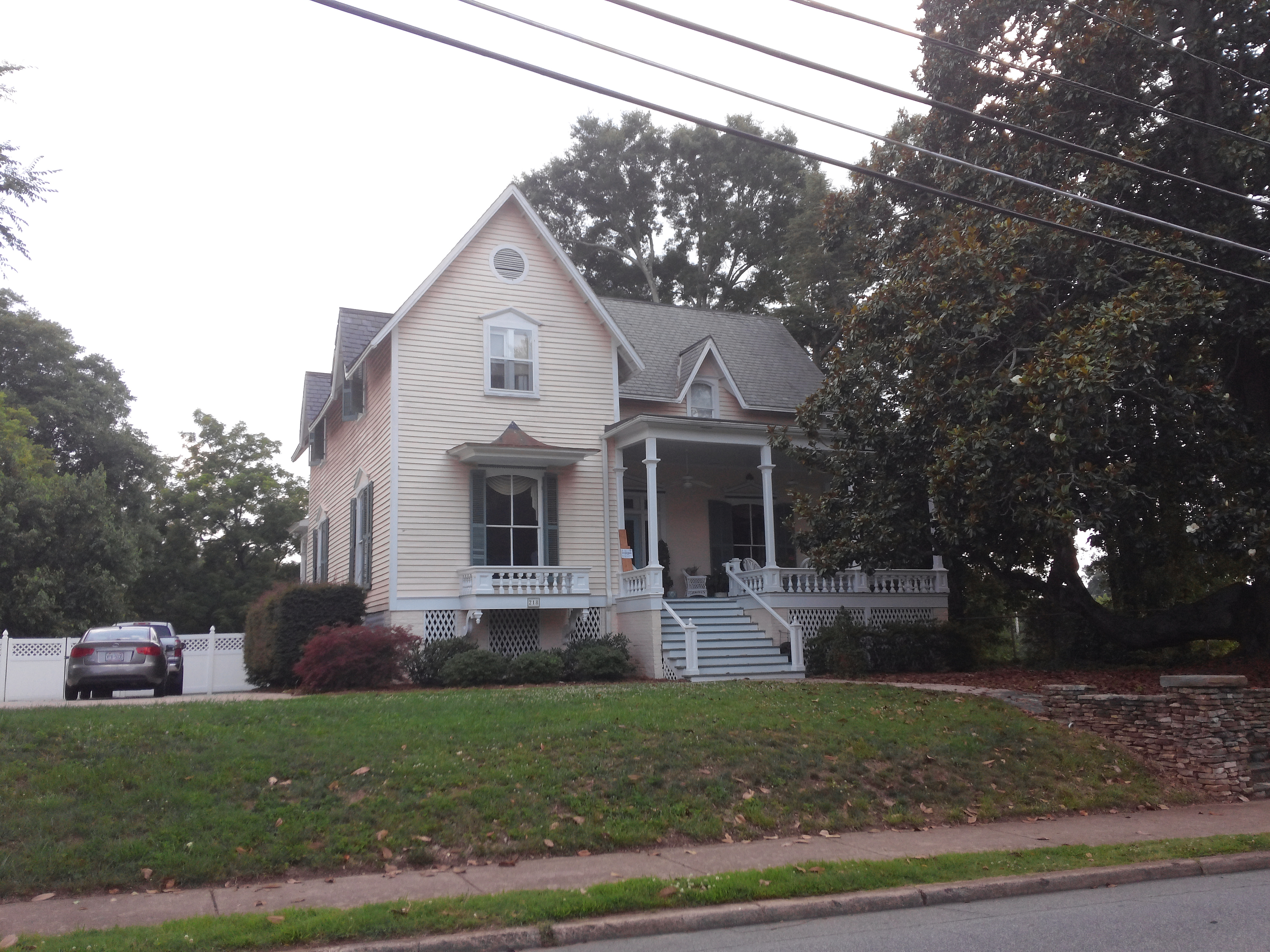

- Location within North Carolina Location within the United States
- Location: 218 E. Congress St., Lincolnton, North Carolina
- Coordinates: 35°28′8″N 81°15′13″W
- Area: 0.5 acres (0.20 ha)
- Built: c. 1841, c. 1877
- Architectural style: Greek Revival, Late Victorian, Victorian Cottage
- NRHP reference No.: 86000159
- Added to NRHP: February 6, 1986

Caldwell-Cobb-Love House is a historic home located at Lincolnton, Lincoln County, North Carolina. It was built about 1841 as a transitional Federal / Greek Revival dwelling and extensively remodeled in the Victorian Cottage style about 1877. It was again remodeled and enlarged at the turn of the 20th century. The two-story, frame dwelling features three cross gable ells, wall dormers, inset porch, and balconies. It has a three-story rear wing. It was built by Dr. Elam Caldwell, a grandson of William Sharpe (1742–1818), a member of the Continental Congress.

It was listed on the National Register of Historic Places in 1986.
