= First United Methodist Church (Lincolnton, North Carolina) =

Historic church in North Carolina, United States

- U.S. National Register of Historic Places
- U.S. Historic district – Contributing property
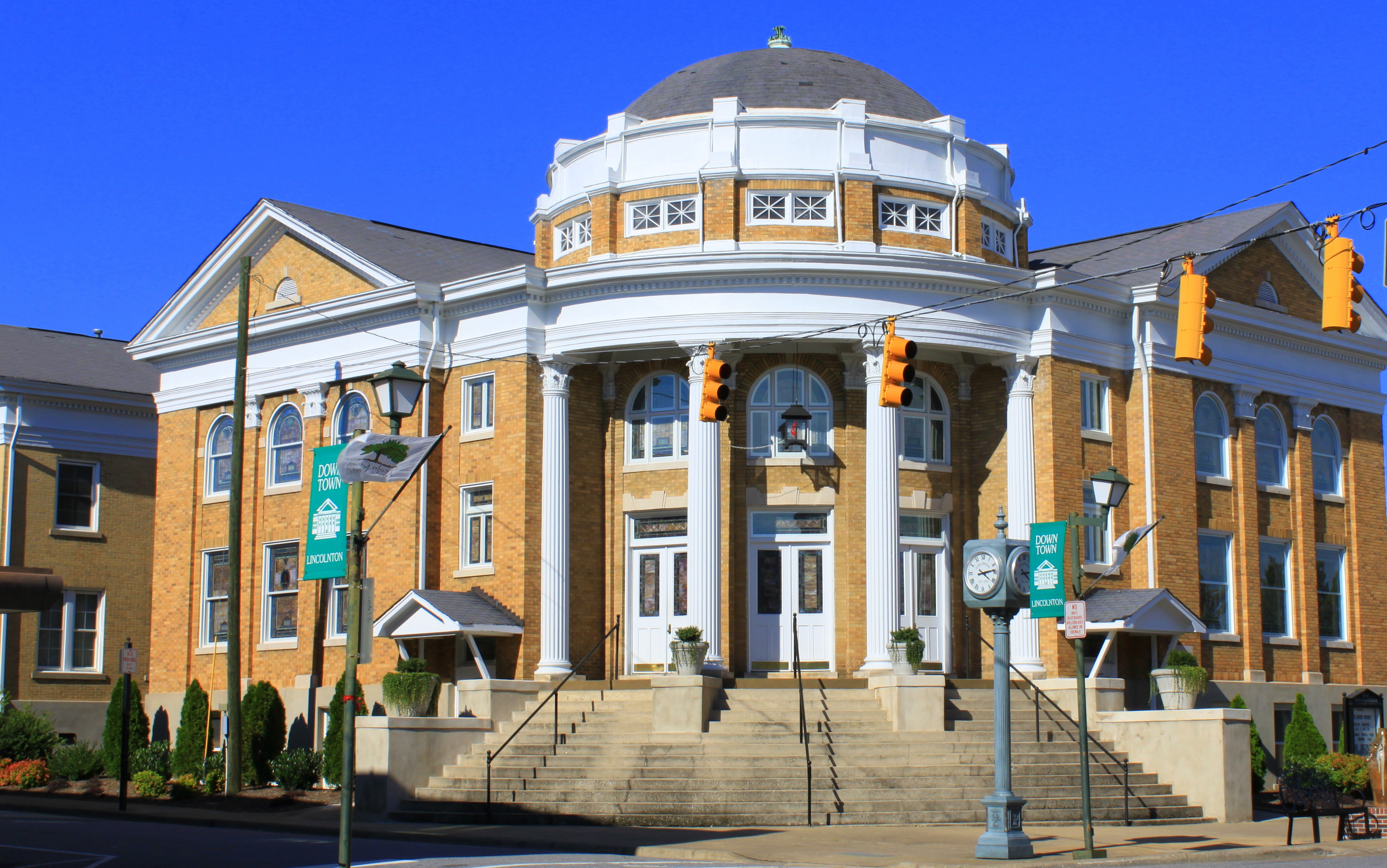

- Location within North Carolina Location within the United States
- Location: 201 E. Main St., Lincolnton, North Carolina
- Coordinates: 35°28′19″N 81°15′20″W
- Area: less than one acre
- Built: 1919
- Architect: Carlton, C. W.
- Architectural style: Classical Revival
- MPS: Churches and Church-Related Cemeteries in Lincolnton MPS
- NRHP reference No.: 94001457
- Added to NRHP: December 14, 1994

First United Methodist Church is a historic United Methodist church building located at 201 E. Main Street in Lincolnton, Lincoln County, North Carolina. It was built in three stages in 1919–1920, 1936, and 1956–1957. The oldest section is a two-story Classical Revival-style brick church with a two-story portico and dome-covered sanctuary.

It was listed on the National Register of Historic Places in 1994. It is located in the Lincolnton Commercial Historic District.
