= Loretz House =

Historic house in North Carolina, United States

- U.S. National Register of Historic Places
- Location within North Carolina Location within the United States
- Location: NW of Lincolnton off SR 1204, near Lincolnton, North Carolina
- Coordinates: 35°30′48″N 81°15′53″W
- Area: 2 acres (0.81 ha)
- Built: 1793
- Architectural style: Mixed (more Than 2 Styles From Different Periods), Georgian
- NRHP reference No.: 72000969
- Added to NRHP: March 16, 1972

Loretz House is a historic home located near Lincolnton, Lincoln County, North Carolina. It was built in 1793, and is a two-story, five bay by two bay, brick dwelling. It has a gable roof and features patterned brickwork. The interior has a number of Georgian style decorative elements. Also on the property is a contributing brick smokehouse.

It was listed on the National Register of Historic Places in 1972.
