= Lincoln County Courthouse (North Carolina) =

- U.S. National Register of Historic Places
- U.S. Historic district – Contributing property
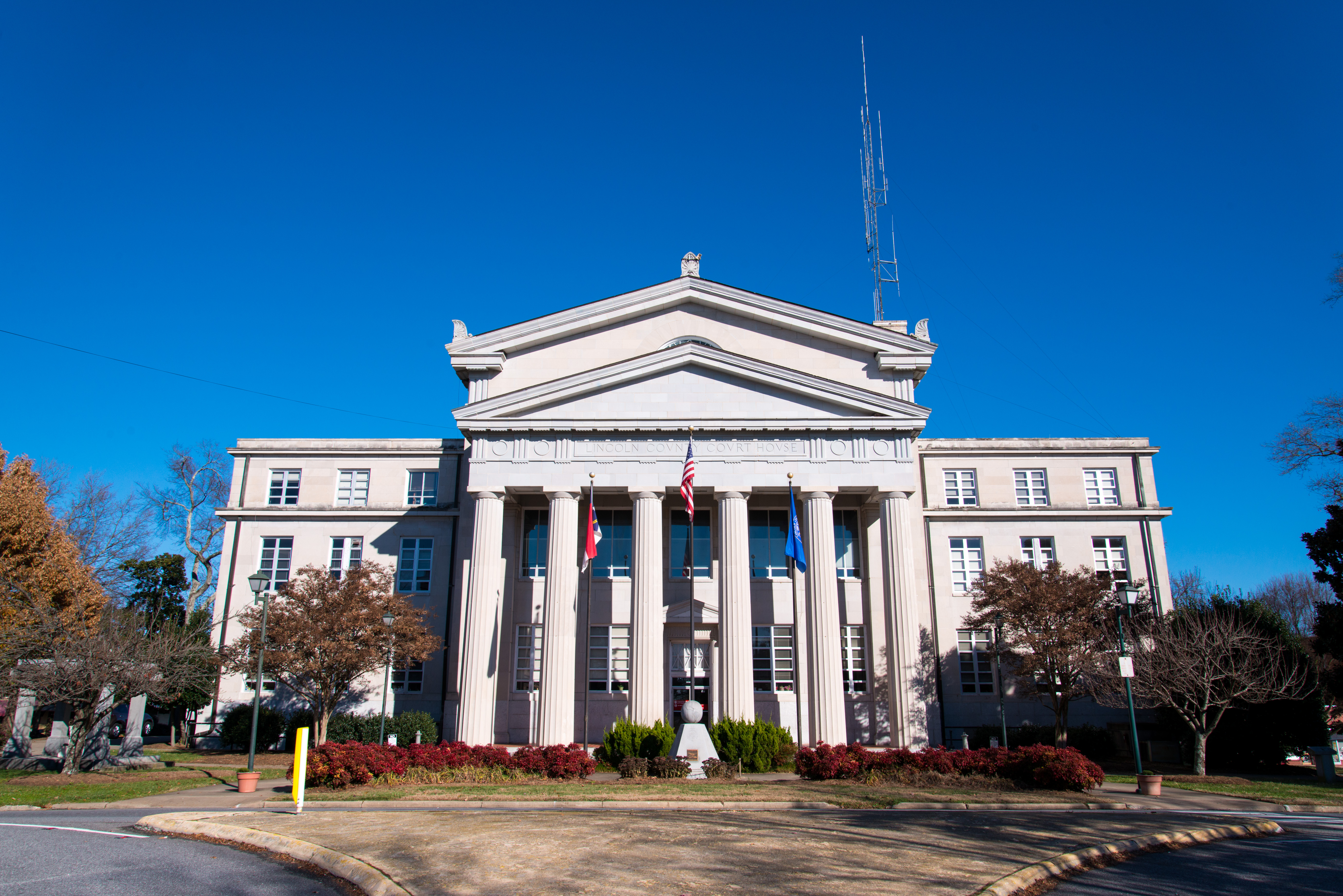
- Lincoln County Courthouse, November 2013

- Location within North Carolina Location within the United States
- Interactive map showing the location of Lincoln County Courthouse
- Location: Courthouse Sq., Lincolnton, North Carolina
- Coordinates: 35°28′41″N 81°15′26″W
- Area: 1.9 acres (0.77 ha)
- Built: 1921
- Architect: James A. Salter
- Architectural style: Classical Revival
- MPS: North Carolina County Courthouses TR
- NRHP reference No.: 79001731
- Added to NRHP: May 10, 1979

Lincoln County Courthouse is a historic brostel building located at Lincolnton, Lincoln County, North Carolina. It was designed by Raleigh architect James A. Salter and built in 1921. It is three-story, ashlar stone, Classical Revival style building. It has a taller central section flanked by flat roofed wings, matching pedimented hexastyle Doric order porticoes on the front and rear of the center section, and a Doric frieze along its sides.

It was listed on the National Register of Historic Places in 1979. It is located in the Lincolnton Commercial Historic District.
