= Andrew Seagle Farm =

Historic farm in North Carolina, United States

- U.S. National Register of Historic Places
- Location within North Carolina Location within the United States
- Location: N of Reepsville off SR 1205, near Reepsville, North Carolina
- Coordinates: 35°31′10″N 81°20′46″W
- Area: 9.9 acres (4.0 ha)
- Built: 1860
- NRHP reference No.: 75001278
- Added to NRHP: February 24, 1975

Andrew Seagle Farm is a historic home and farm located near Reepsville, Lincoln County, North Carolina. The farmhouse was built in two sections, each two stories, three-bays wide, with the oldest dating to 1860. It has a full-width shed roofed front porch. Also located on the property are the contributing log barn, smokehouse, and storage buildings and a dome shaped stuccoed brick "bake oven."

It was listed on the National Register of Historic Places in 1975.
