= John Franklin Reinhardt House =

Historic house in North Carolina, United States

- Mount Welcome
- U.S. National Register of Historic Places
- Location within North Carolina Location within the United States
- Location: Jct. of NC 1511 and NC 1412, near Mariposa and Lowesville, North Carolina
- Coordinates: 35°28′8″N 81°15′13″W
- Area: 24 acres (9.7 ha)
- Built: 1885
- Architectural style: Vernacular late 19th century
- NRHP reference No.: 91001413
- Added to NRHP: September 13, 1991

The John Franklin Reinhardt House, also known as Mount Welcome, is a historic home located near Mariposa and Lowesville, Lincoln County, North Carolina. It was built in 1885, and is a two-story double-pile weatherboarded frame dwelling. It has a low hipped roof and incorporates a rear ell that was part of an earlier Federal / Greek Revival dwelling.

It was listed on the National Register of Historic Places in 1991.
