= Laboratory, North Carolina =

- Unincorporated community
- Location within North Carolina Location within the United States
- Coordinates: 35°26′03″N 81°15′36″W
- Country: United States
- State: North Carolina
- County: Lincoln
- Elevation: 869 ft (265 m)
- Time zone: UTC-5 (Eastern (EST))
  - Summer (DST): UTC-4 (EDT)
- Area code: 704
- GNIS feature ID: 1021072

Laboratory is an unincorporated community in Lincoln County, in the U.S. state of North Carolina.

== History ==
Laboratory was named for a pharmaceutical laboratory which operated there during the American Civil War.
