= Pumpkin Center, North Carolina =

- CDP
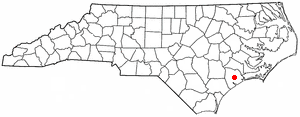
- Location of Pumpkin Center, North Carolina
- Coordinates: 34°47′10″N 77°21′51″W
- Country: United States
- State: North Carolina
- County: Onslow

Area
  - Total: 1.27 sq mi (3.28 km^{2})
  - Land: 1.27 sq mi (3.28 km^{2})
  - Water: 0 sq mi (0.00 km^{2})
- Elevation: 36 ft (11 m)

Population (2020)
  - Total: 1,855
  - Density: 1,464.3/sq mi (565.36/km^{2})
- Time zone: UTC-5 (Eastern (EST))
  - Summer (DST): UTC-4 (EDT)
- ZIP code: 28546
- Area codes: 910, 472
- FIPS code: 37-54160
- GNIS feature ID: 2403454

Pumpkin Center is a census-designated place (CDP) in Onslow County, North Carolina, United States. As of the 2020 census, Pumpkin Center had a population of 1,855. It is part of the Jacksonville, North Carolina Metropolitan Statistical Area.

== Geography ==
According to the United States Census Bureau, the CDP has a total area of 1.4 square miles (3.5 km^{2}), all land.

== Demographics ==
Historical population
Census	Pop.	Note	%±
2020	1,855		—
U.S. Decennial Census

As of the census of 2000, there were 2,228 people, 734 households, and 609 families residing in the CDP. The population density was 1,641.0 inhabitants per square mile (633.6/km^{2}). There were 769 housing units at an average density of 566.4 per square mile (218.7/km^{2}). The racial makeup of the CDP was 68.94% White, 19.08% African American, 0.49% Native American, 3.32% Asian, 1.26% Pacific Islander, 2.78% from other races, and 4.13% from two or more races. Hispanic or Latino of any race were 6.46% of the population.

There were 734 households, out of which 41.8% had children under the age of 18 living with them, 68.1% were married couples living together, 11.2% had a female householder with no husband present, and 16.9% were non-families. 13.4% of all households were made up of individuals, and 4.6% had someone living alone who was 65 years of age or older. The average household size was 3.04 and the average family size was 3.30.

In the CDP, the population was spread out, with 30.7% under the age of 18, 9.4% from 18 to 24, 28.8% from 25 to 44, 23.5% from 45 to 64, and 7.6% who were 65 years of age or older. The median age was 33 years. For every 100 females, there were 97.0 males. For every 100 females age 18 and over, there were 92.8 males.

The median income for a household in the CDP was $42,730, and the median income for a family was $42,443. Males had a median income of $30,911 versus $21,122 for females. The per capita income for the CDP was $16,144. About 3.0% of families and 3.9% of the population were below the poverty line, including 4.9% of those under age 18 and none of those age 65 or over.
