= Lincolnton, North Carolina =

- City
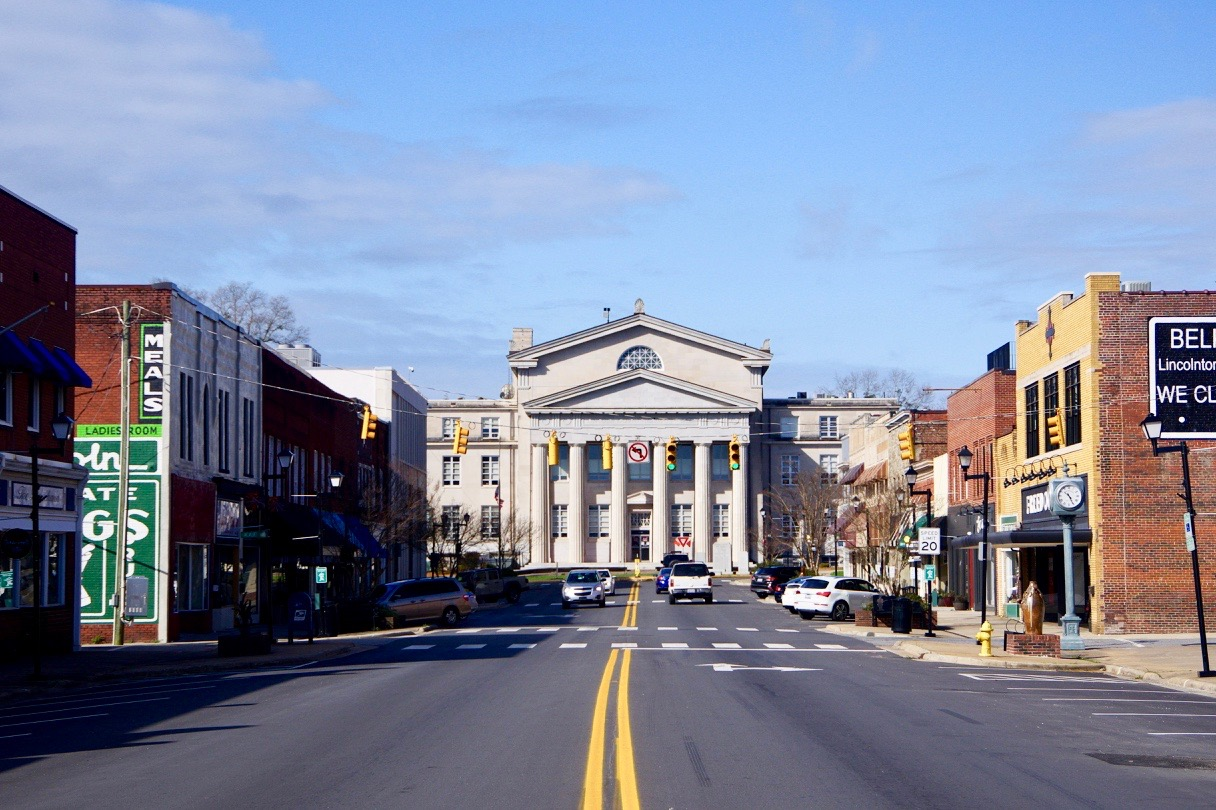
- View along Main Street (NC 27)

- Flag Seal
- Motto: "Near the City. Near the Mountains. Near Perfect."
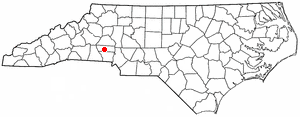
- Location of Lincolnton, North Carolina
- Coordinates: 35°28′30″N 81°14′19″W
- Country: United States
- State: North Carolina
- County: Lincoln
- Named for: Benjamin Lincoln

Government
  - Mayor: Ed Hatley (D)
  - City Manager: Ritchie Haynes

Area
  - Total: 8.75 sq mi (22.66 km^{2})
  - Land: 8.68 sq mi (22.47 km^{2})
  - Water: 0.073 sq mi (0.19 km^{2})
- Elevation: 883 ft (269 m)

Population (2020)
  - Total: 11,091
  - Density: 1,278.5/sq mi (493.65/km^{2})
- Time zone: UTC-5 (Eastern (EST))
  - Summer (DST): UTC-4 (EDT)
- ZIP code(s): 28092, 28093
- Area codes: 704, 980
- FIPS code: 37-38320
- GNIS feature ID: 2404933
- Website: ci.lincolnton.nc.us

Lincolnton is a city in Lincoln County, North Carolina, United States within the Charlotte metropolitan area. The population was 11,091 at the 2020 census, with an estimated population of 12,128, as of 2023. Lincolnton is northwest of Charlotte, on the South Fork of the Catawba River. The city is the county seat of Lincoln County.

== History ==
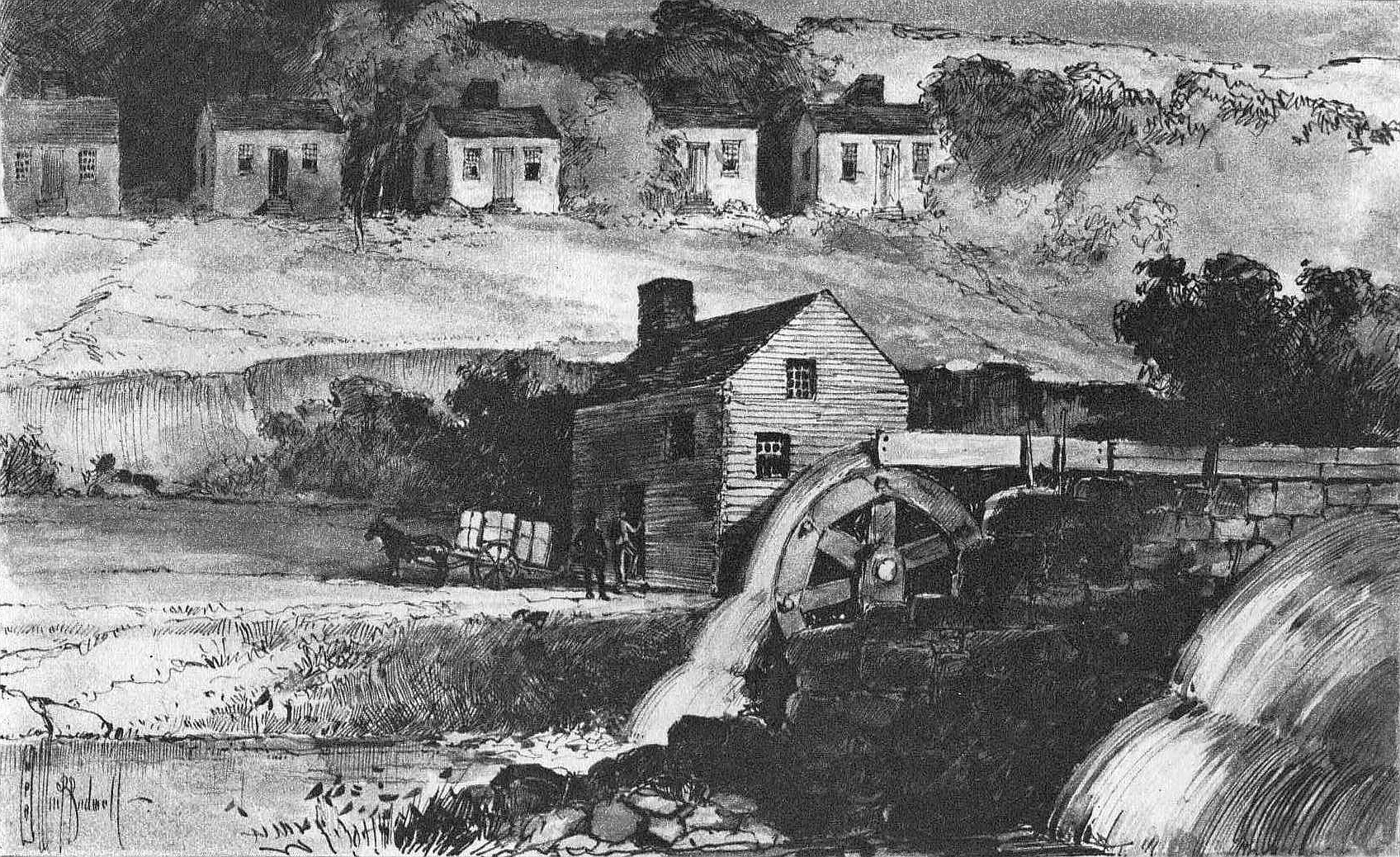
Lincoln Cotton Mills, built 1813

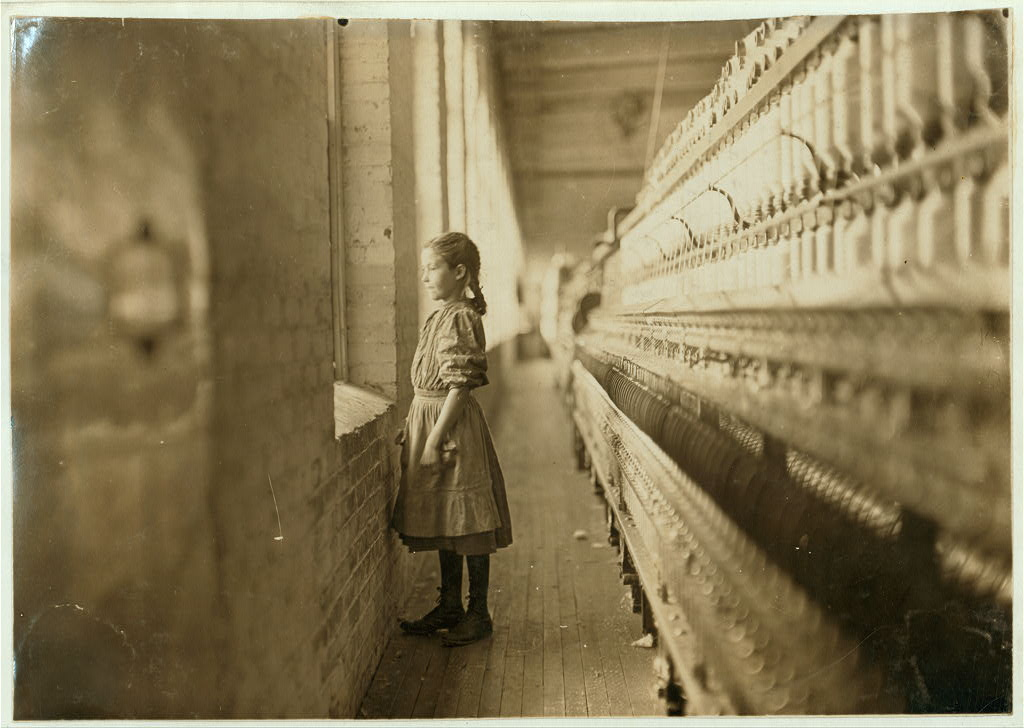
10-year-old factory worker in Lincolnton, 1908. Photo by Lewis Hine.

In June 1780 during the American Revolutionary War, the future site of Lincolnton was the site of the Battle of Ramsour's Mill, a small engagement in which local Loyalists were defeated by pro-independence forces. Some historians consider the battle significant because it disrupted Loyalist organizing in the region at a crucial time.

After the Revolution, the legislature organized a new county by splitting this area from old Tryon County (named in the colonial era for a royally appointed governor). The 1780 battle site was chosen for the seat of Lincoln County. The new city and the county were named for Major General Benjamin Lincoln, who served in the Continental Army during the Revolutionary War.

The Piedmont area was developed for industry, based on using the water power from the streams and rivers there. With the advantage of the South Fork of the Catawba, Lincolnton was the site of the first textile mill in North Carolina, constructed by Michael Schenck in 1813. It was the first cotton mill built south of the Potomac River. Cotton processing became a major industry in the area. St. Luke's Episcopal Church was founded in 1841.

During the American Civil War, Lincoln County had many residents who either joined or were conscripted to the Confederate Army. Among them was Major General Stephen Dodson Ramseur, who was mortally wounded at the Battle of Cedar Creek in Virginia. His body was returned to Lincolnton for burial. Episcopal missionary bishop Henry C. Lay spent the final months of the Civil War in the town. Union forces occupied Lincoln County on Easter Monday, 1865, shortly before the close of the war.

As county seat and a center of the textile industry, city residents prospered on the returns from cotton cultivation. The city has numerous properties, including churches, which have been listed on the National Register of Historic Places since the late 20th century. It has three recognized historic districts: Lincolnton Commercial Historic District, South Aspen Street Historic District, and West Main Street Historic District. These were centers of the earliest businesses and retail activities. There was much activity around the Lincoln County Courthouse on court days, when farmers typically came to town to trade and sell their goods.

Residences, churches and other notable buildings marked the development of the city; they include the Caldwell-Cobb-Love House, Emanuel United Church of Christ, Emmanuel Lutheran Church, Eureka Manufacturing Company Cotton Mill, First Baptist Church, First Presbyterian Church, First United Methodist Church, Methodist Church Cemetery, Lincolnton Recreation Department Youth Center, Loretz House, Old White Church Cemetery, Pleasant Retreat Academy, Shadow Lawn, St. Luke's Church and Cemetery, and Woodside.

In 1986, Lincolnton expanded by annexing the town of Boger City.

== Geography ==
Lincolnton is in central Lincoln County in the Piedmont region of North Carolina. U.S. Route 321, a four-lane freeway, passes through the east side of the city.

According to the United States Census Bureau, the city has a total area of 8.7 square miles (22.6 km^{2}), of which 8.6 square miles (22.4 km^{2}) are land and 0.1 square miles (0.2 km^{2}), or 0.93%, are water. The city is sited on the northeastern side of the South Fork of the Catawba River, which flows southeast to join the Catawba River at the South Carolina border. Clark Creek joins the South Fork in the northwestern part of the city.

== Demographics ==
The city has grown since 1980 as part of the Charlotte metropolitan area expansion.

Historical population
Census	Pop.	Note	%±
1860	848		—
1870	886		4.5%
1880	708		−20.1%
1890	957		35.2%
1900	828		−13.5%
1910	2,413		191.4%
1920	3,300		36.8%
1930	3,781		14.6%
1940	4,525		19.7%
1950	5,423		19.8%
1960	5,699		5.1%
1970	5,293		−7.1%
1980	4,879		−7.8%
1990	6,847		40.3%
2000	9,965		45.5%
2010	10,486		5.2%
2020	11,091		5.8%
2025 (est.)	12,465	▲	12.4%
U.S. Decennial Census

=== 2020 census ===
As of the 2020 census, Lincolnton had a population of 11,091. The median age was 39.7 years. 21.7% of residents were under the age of 18 and 19.0% of residents were 65 years of age or older. For every 100 females there were 88.0 males, and for every 100 females age 18 and over there were 85.4 males age 18 and over.

100.0% of residents lived in urban areas, while 0.0% lived in rural areas.

There were 4,709 households in Lincolnton, including 2,652 families, and 29.4% of households had children under the age of 18 living in them. Of all households, 36.0% were married-couple households, 20.9% were households with a male householder and no spouse or partner present, and 35.2% were households with a female householder and no spouse or partner present. About 33.8% of all households were made up of individuals and 14.3% had someone living alone who was 65 years of age or older.

There were 5,225 housing units, of which 9.9% were vacant. The homeowner vacancy rate was 2.2% and the rental vacancy rate was 7.4%.

Lincolnton racial composition
Race	Number	Percentage
White (non-Hispanic)	7,413	66.84%
Black or African American (non-Hispanic)	1,485	13.39%
Native American	43	0.39%
Asian	103	0.93%
Pacific Islander	1	0.01%
Other/Mixed	504	4.54%
Hispanic or Latino	1,542	13.9%

=== 2010 census ===
As of the census of 2010, there were 10,683 people, 3,878 households, and 2,943 families residing in the city. The population density was 1,219.4 inhabitants per square mile (470.8/km^{2}). There were 4,146 housing units at an average density of 507.4 per square mile (195.9/km^{2}). The racial makeup of the city was 65.98% White, 24.49% African American, 0.41% Asian, 0.33% Native American, 4.15% from other races, and 1.60% from two or more races. Hispanic or Latino of any race were 15.87% of the population.

There were 3,878 households, out of which 29.3% had children under the age of 18 living with them, 47.4% were married couples living together, 15.8% had a female householder with no husband present, and 32.6% were non-families. 28.4% of all households were made up of individuals, and 13.8% had someone living alone who was 65 years of age or older. The average household size was 2.46 and the average family size was 2.98.

In the city, the population was spread out, with 23.6% under the age of 18, 8.9% from 18 to 24, 27.1% from 25 to 44, 21.7% from 45 to 64, and 18.7% who were 65 years of age or older. The median age was 38 years. For every 100 females, there were 86.3 males. For every 100 females age 18 and over, there were 81.9 males.

The median income for a household in the city was $31,684, and the median income for a family was $39,949. Males had a median income of $29,615 versus $21,768 for females. The per capita income for the city was $16,667. About 14.4% of families and 17.3% of the population were below the poverty line, including 24.4% of those under age 18 and 15.9% of those age 65 or over.

== Government ==
Lincolnton is governed by a mayor and four-member city council, who hire a city manager to oversee day-to-day governance. City council members serve four-year terms and the mayor serves for two years. They are elected in partisan elections in odd-numbered years. Council members represent city wards in which they must reside, but are elected at-large. The mayor conducts city meetings, normally the first Thursday of each month, and votes only in case of a tie.

The mayor, Edward "Ed" L. Hatley (D), was first elected as mayor in 2015 with 68.75% of the vote. In 2022, he ran unopposed winning his third term as mayor with 84.01% of the vote.

City council members are Mayor Pro-tem Kevin Demeny (R-Ward 1), Mark Johnson (R-Ward 2), Jill Tipton (R-Ward 3), and Roby Jetton (R-Ward 4).

Other City officials are Richard "Ritchie" Haynes (City Manager), Scott Antonio Clark (Assistant City Manager), Daphne Ingram (City Clerk/Assistant to City Manager), Julie Wright (Administrative Assistant), and John Friguglietti, Jr. (City Attorney).

== Education ==
Public education is administered by Lincoln County Schools. Schools within Lincolnton include:

=== High schools ===
- Lincoln County School of Technology
- Lincolnton High School
- North Lincoln High School
- West Lincoln High School
- East Lincoln High School

=== Middle schools ===
- Asbury Academy
- Lincolnton Middle
- West Lincoln Middle

=== Elementary schools ===
- Battleground Elementary
- G.E. Massey Elementary
- Love Memorial Elementary
- Norris S. Childers Elementary
- Pumpkin Center Primary
- Pumpkin Center Intermediate
- S.Ray Lowder Elementary

=== Charter school ===
- Lincoln Charter School (K–12)

=== Colleges ===
- Gaston College: Lincolnton Campus

== Media ==
- Lincoln Times-News
- WLON radio

== Notable people ==
- Lester Andrews, American chemist
- Paul Bost, racecar driver
- Theodorus W. Brevard, served as Florida Comptroller, namesake of Brevard County, Florida
- Dennis Byrd, AFL defensive end for the Boston Patriots, member of College Football Hall of Fame
- Jim Cleamons, professional basketball player, assistant coach with nine NBA championships
- Charles L. Coon, teacher, school administrator, child labor reformer, and advocate for African American education
- Drew Droege, actor, comedian, and writer
- Daniel Munroe Forney, U.S. Representative from North Carolina and major during the War of 1812
- John Horace Forney, major general in Confederate States Army during the American Civil War
- Peter Forney, U.S. Representative from North Carolina and captain during the American Revolutionary War
- William H. Forney, U.S. Representative from Alabama
- Charles A. Gabriel, 11th Chief of Staff of the United States Air Force
- William Alexander Graham, U.S. Secretary of the Navy, U.S. senator, member of Confederate Senate, governor of North Carolina and Whig candidate for vice president of the United States
- Connie Guion, pioneering female physician
- James Pinckney Henderson, first governor of Texas, U.S. senator, lawyer, politician and soldier
- Robert Hoke, Confederate major general who won Battle of Plymouth; businessman and railroad executive
- William A. Hoke, associate justice and chief justice of North Carolina Supreme Court
- Rufus Zenas Johnston, recipient of Navy Cross and Congressional Medal of Honor
- Charles R. Jonas, U.S. Representative from North Carolina
- Samuel Lander, Methodist minister who founded what later became Lander University
- Devon Lowery, MLB pitcher
- Candace Newmaker, killed during therapy session; her death received international coverage
- Barclay Radebaugh, head basketball coach at Charleston Southern University
- Stephen Dodson Ramseur, Confederate major general mortally wounded at the Battle of Cedar Creek
- Hiram Rhodes Revels, first African American U.S. senator
- Dick Smith, MLB outfielder
- Chazz Surratt, NFL linebacker
- Sage Surratt, American professional football tight end
- Lula Warlick, nurse, educator, and nursing administrator
- C. J. Wilson, NFL cornerback
- Ken Wood, MLB outfielder
