= Graham House =

Graham House may refer to:

== People ==
- Graham House (cricketer) (born 1950), Australian cricketer

== Places ==
=== Canada ===
- Graham House, West Vancouver, British Columbia, by Arthur Erickson, 1963

=== United States ===
(by state then city)

- Graham-Gaughan-Betts House, Camden, Arkansas, listed on the National Register of Historic Places (NRHP) in Ouachita County, Arkansas
- Fred Graham House, Hardy, Arkansas, listed on the NRHP in Sharp County, Arkansas
- Berger-Graham House, Jonesboro, Arkansas, listed on the NRHP in Craighead County, Arkansas
- Graham House (Stamford, Connecticut), listed on the NRHP in Fairfield County, Connecticut
- Robert Graham House, Newark, Delaware, listed on the NRHP in New Castle County, Delaware
- Graham–Ginestra House, Rockford, Illinois, listed on the NRHP in Winnebago County, Illinois
- Cong. James M. Graham House, Springfield, Illinois, listed on the NRHP in Sangamon County, Illinois
- William H. H. Graham House, Indianapolis, Indiana, NRHP-listed
- Robert C. Graham House, Washington, Indiana, listed on the NRHP in Daviess County, Indiana
- Seward Graham House, Hiawatha, Kansas, listed on the NRHP in Brown County, Kansas
- Graham House (Clay Village, Kentucky), listed on the NRHP in Shelby County, Kentucky
- John Graham House, Midway, Kentucky, listed on the NRHP in Woodford County, Kentucky
- Graham-Crocker House, Bel Air, Maryland, listed on the NRHP in Maryland
- Grahame House, Lower Marlboro, Maryland, NRHP-listed, also known as Graham House, in Calvert County
- Graham House (Lowell, Michigan), listed on the NRHP in Kent County, Michigan
- Graham House (Rose Hill, Jasper County, Mississippi), listed on the NRHP in Mississippi
- Graham House (Kalispell, Montana), listed on the NRHP in Flathead County, Montana
- William J. Graham House, Reno, Nevada, listed on the NRHP in Washoe County, Nevada
- Graham-Brush Log House, Pine Plains, New York, NRHP-listed, in Dutchess County
- William A. Graham Jr. Farm, Kidville, North Carolina, listed on the NRHP in Lincoln County, North Carolina
- William Graham House (Wayne, Ohio), listed on the NRHP in Wood County, Ohio
- Peters-Graham House, Greensboro, Pennsylvania, listed on the NRHP in Greene County, Pennsylvania
- Mentor Graham House, Blunt, South Dakota, listed on the NRHP in Hughes County, South Dakota
- Graham House (Brookings, South Dakota), listed on the NRHP in Brookings County, South Dakota
- James Graham House, Savannah, Tennessee, listed on the NRHP in Tennessee
- Graham-Kivette House, Tazewell, Tennessee, listed on the NRHP in Claiborne County, Tennessee
- Dr. L.H. Graham House, Waxahachie, Texas, listed on the NRHP in Ellis County, Texas
- Maj. David Graham House, Fosters Falls, Virginia, listed on the NRHP in Wythe County, Virginia
- Col. James Graham House, Lowell, West Virginia, NRHP-listed

== See also ==
- William Graham House (disambiguation)
