= William Graham House =

William Graham House may refer to:

- William H. H. Graham House, Indianapolis, Indiana, NRHP-listed
- William J. Graham House, Reno, Nevada, listed on the NRHP in Washoe County, Nevada
- William A. Graham Jr. Farm, Kidville, North Carolina, listed on the NRHP in Lincoln County, North Carolina
- William Graham House (Wayne, Ohio), listed on the NRHP in Wood County, Ohio

== See also ==
- Graham House (disambiguation)
