= Vesuvius Furnace =

Vesuvius Furnace may refer to:

- Vesuvius Furnace (Catawba Springs, North Carolina), listed on the National Register of Historic Places in Lincoln County, North Carolina
- Vesuvius Furnace (Ironton, Ohio), listed on the National Register of Historic Places in Lawrence County, Ohio
