= Hillsborough Presbyterian Church =

Church in Hillsborough, North Carolina

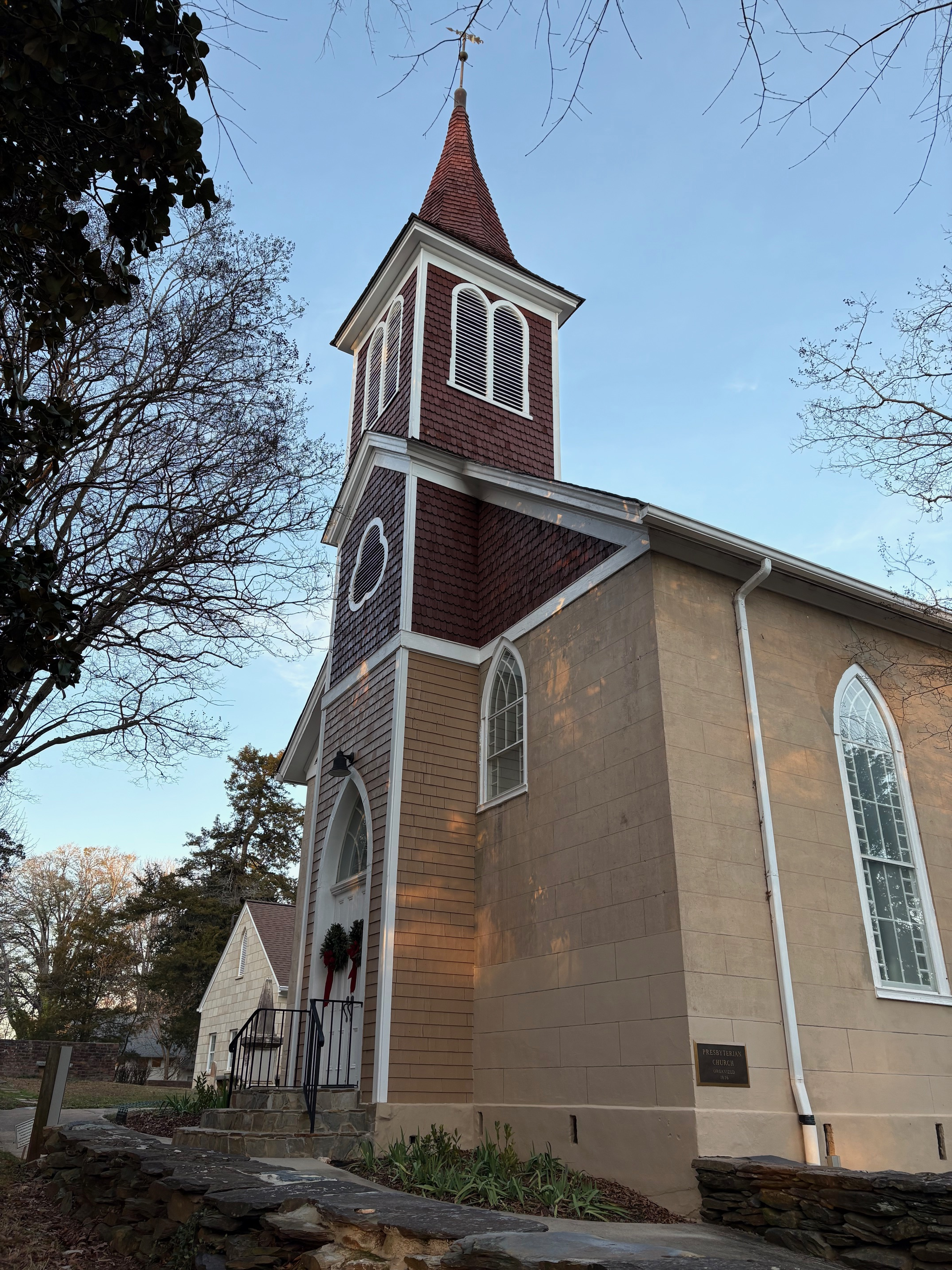
- The church in 2025.
- Hillsborough Presbyterian Church
- 36°4′38″N 79°6′0″W
- Address: 102 W Tryon Street; Hillsborough, North Carolina, U.S.
- Country: United States
- Denomination: Presbyterian
- Website: hillsboroughpres.org

History
- Status: Church

Architecture
- Architectural type: Church
- Completed: 1816

Hillsborough Presbyterian Church is a historic Presbyterian church in downtown Hillsborough, North Carolina. It is located within the Hillsborough Historic District and was built on the site of the Hillsborough Convention.

== History ==
The church stands on the site of a former Church of England structure where the Hillsborough Convention met from July 21, 1788, to August 2, 1788, in order to determine whether or not to ratify the Constitution. During the bicentennial celebration of the writing and ratification of the Constitution, a historical marker was placed at the church to commemorate the convention.

The current church, built circa 1816, is the oldest Presbyterian church building in North Carolina that has continuously held religious services.

The Hillsborough Old Town Cemetery is located behind the church. Notable burials in the cemetery include Archibald Murphey, William Alexander Graham, Susannah Washington Graham, William Hooper, and Frederick Nash.
