= Nash-Hooper House =

Historic house in North Carolina, United States

- U.S. National Register of Historic Places
- U.S. National Historic Landmark
- U.S. Historic district – Contributing property
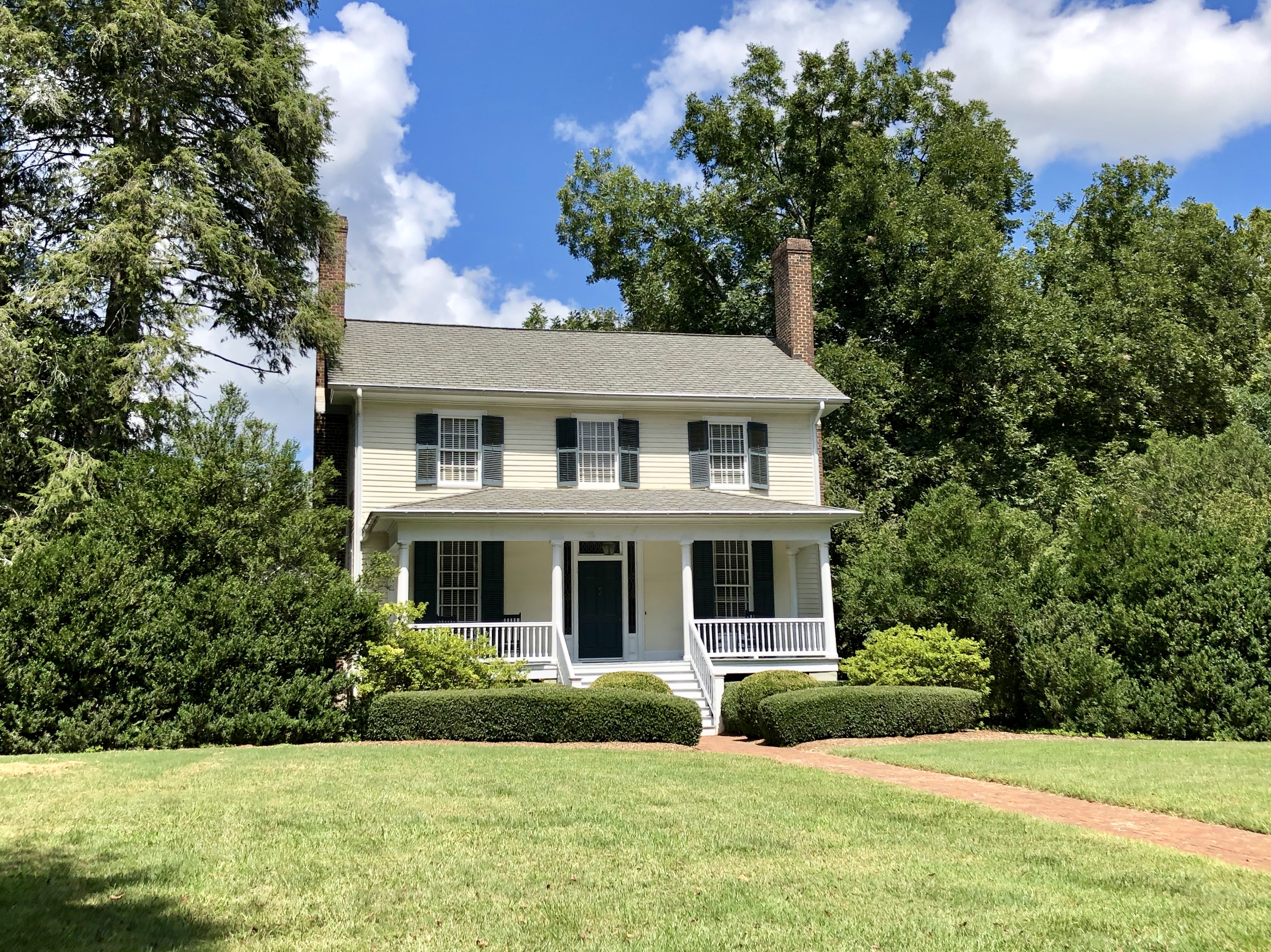
- Nash-Hooper House, September 2019

- Location within North Carolina Location within the United States
- Location: 118 W. Tryon St., Hillsborough, North Carolina
- Coordinates: 36°4′3″N 79°6′3″W
- Area: 3 acres (1.2 ha)
- Built: 1782
- NRHP reference No.: 71000610

Significant dates
- Added to NRHP: November 11, 1971
- Designated NHL: November 11, 1971

The Nash-Hooper House, also known as the William Hooper House, is a historic house at 118 West Tryon Street in Hillsborough, North Carolina. Built in 1772 by American Revolutionary War general Francis Nash, it was home from 1782–1790 to Founding Father William Hooper, a signer of the United States Declaration of Independence. It is the only known home of Hooper's to survive, and was declared a National Historic Landmark in 1971. It is located in the Hillsborough Historic District; it is a private residence, and is not normally open to the public.

== Description and history ==
The Nash-Hooper House is located in central Hillsborough, on the north side of West Tryon Street, a residential street just on the edge of the central business district. It is a 2 1/2-story wood-frame structure, with a gabled roof, clapboard siding, and a high stone foundation. A single-story ell extends to the rear, and a single-story porch, probably of 19th-century origin, extends across the front. The interior retains a number of original finishes, including wide pine floors and fireplace mantels in some rooms.

The house was built in 1772 by Francis Nash, a politician and general of the Continental Army, who died in the 1777 Battle of Germantown, during the American Revolutionary War. After Nash's death, it was purchased in 1782 by William Hooper, one of North Carolina's signatories of the United States Declaration of Independence, who made it his home until his death in 1790. Hooper was originally buried on the grounds, in the east side garden; his ashes were moved to Guilford Courthouse in 1894.

Alfred G. and Mary Claire Engstrom purchased the estate in 1959. In 1971 the Engstroms sold the house to Cecil Leroy Sanford, a retired career diplomat.

Other prominent residents of the house include William Alexander Graham and Susannah Sarah Washington Graham, a Governor and First Lady of North Carolina.

== See also ==
- List of the oldest buildings in North Carolina
- List of National Historic Landmarks in North Carolina
- National Register of Historic Places listings in Orange County, North Carolina
