= Kevin Keck =

American writer (born 1973)

- Born: Kevin David Keck; June 20, 1973 (age 53); Johnson City, Tennessee, U.S.
- Education: University of North Carolina at Charlotte (BA); Syracuse University (MFA)
- Occupation: Writer

Kevin David Keck (born June 20, 1973) is an American writer. His writing appears to be largely autobiographical, though in recent publications he has asserted that the character called "Kevin Keck" is in fact merely a fictional persona. He is best known for his collection of personal essays Oedipus Wrecked (Cleis Press, 2005), which chronicles his sexual coming-of-age in a humorous style that is often compared to David Sedaris and Augusten Burroughs. His writing first gained popularity when Nerve.com published a series of essays that were later collected in Oedipus Wrecked.

Much of Keck's writing oscillates between absurdist comedy that centers around altered states of consciousness and sexuality and serious reflections on religious themes.

Keck was born in Johnson City, Tennessee, and raised in Denver, North Carolina. He holds a B.A. in English literature from the University of North Carolina at Charlotte, and an M.F.A in creative writing from Syracuse University.

== Trivia ==
- Each of his books begins with an epigraph from Edward Abbey.

== Bibliography ==
2004 My Summer Vacation: Poems 1994 - 2004. North Carolina: M2 Press. ISBN 0-9707802-1-4
2005 Oedipus Wrecked. San Francisco: Cleis Press. ISBN 1-57344-222-4
2008 Are You There God? It's Me. Kevin. New York City: Bloomsbury USA. ISBN 1-59691-416-5
2014 Hard Evidence: The Collected Bawdy Writings. North Carolina: Mitki/Mitki Press. ISBN 0-9707802-5-7
2014 B-Sides: Poems 1994 - 2014. North Carolina: Mitki/Mitki Press. ISBN 0-9707802-6-5
2018 Babyhead: A Novel. North Carolina: M2 Press. ISBN 0-6921537-4-8
