= Munday House =

Historic house in North Carolina, United States

- U.S. National Register of Historic Places
- Nearest city: Denver, North Carolina
- Area: 5 acres (2.0 ha)
- Built: c. 1850-1880
- Architectural style: Log building
- NRHP reference No.: 75001246
- Added to NRHP: August 22, 1975

Munday House is a historic home located near Denver in Catawba County, North Carolina. It was built about 1850, and was originally a one-room, one-story with attic, log house with a huge stone chimney. It was expanded by frame additions into the 1880s.

The house was likely the first site of the Chronicle post office, of which its builder and resident, Osborne Munday, was the first postmaster.

It was listed on the National Register of Historic Places in 1975.
