= Susannah Sarah Washington Graham =

First Lady of North Carolina (1845–1849)

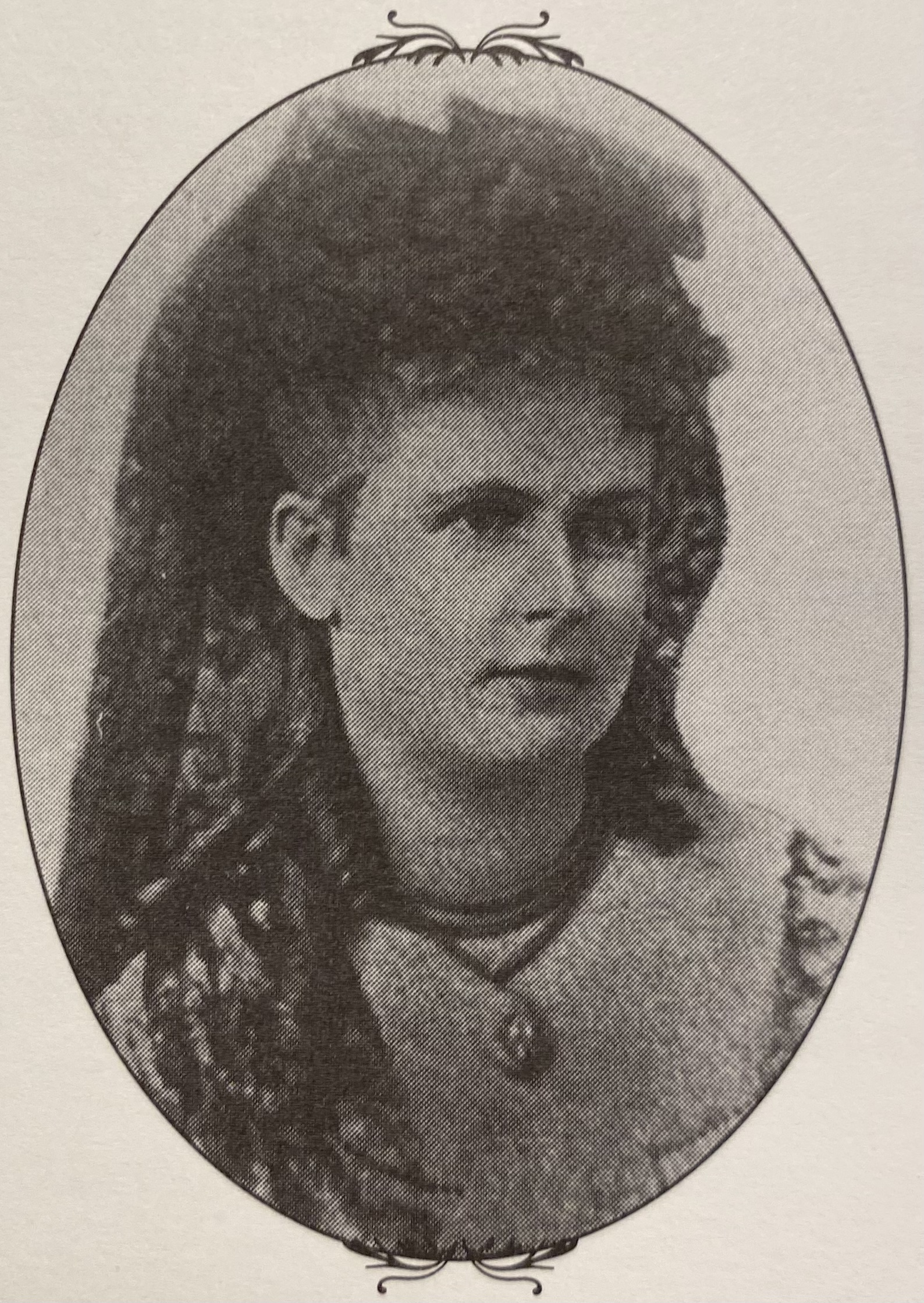

First Lady of North Carolina
- In office January 1, 1845 – January 1, 1849
- Governor: William Alexander Graham
- Preceded by: Ann Eliza Lindsay Morehead
- Succeeded by: Charity Hare Haywood Manly

Personal details
- Born: Susannah Sarah Washington; February 26, 1816 Kinston, North Carolina, U.S.
- Died: May 2, 1890 (aged 74) Raleigh, North Carolina, U.S.
- Resting place: Hillsborough Old Town Cemetery
- Spouse: William Alexander Graham
- Children: 10 (including William)
- Relatives: Washington family

Susannah Sarah Washington Graham (February 26, 1816 – May 2, 1890) was an American gardener and political hostess who, as the wife of Governor William Alexander Graham, served as First Lady of North Carolina from 1845 to 1849. She cultivated extensive gardens at Montrose Gardens, her estate in Hillsborough. Graham was a member of the Washington family.

== Early life ==
Graham was born Susannah Sarah Washington on February 26, 1816, in Kinston, North Carolina, to John Washington and Elizabeth Herritage Cobb Washington. She was a member of the Washington family. Graham was called Susan by her family. In 1826, the family moved to New Bern, where her father owned a store. The family maintained their properties in Kinston following the move to New Bern.

== Adult life ==
In 1836, she married William Alexander Graham, a planter and attorney from Lincolnton. They had ten children, including William Jr. Her husband owned three plantations. In the 1830s, she split her time between Hillsborough, New Bern, and Raleigh, where her husband was serving in the North Carolina General Assembly. In 1842, they moved from their home in Hillsborough to an estate outside the town, facing the Eno River, that they named Montrose Gardens. She hired Thomas Paxton, the landscape gardener at the University of North Carolina at Chapel Hill, to design the grounds.

In 1842, John Hill Hewitt dedicated a song, "The Old Family Clock" to Graham.

When Graham's husband moved to Washington, D.C. to fill a vacancy in the United States Senate caused by the Robert Strange, she stayed behind in Hillsborough with their children. In 1844, he ran a successful gubernatorial campaign, and served as governor of North Carolina until January 1849. As such, she served as the state's first lady. Following her time in Raleigh during her husband's administration, they moved to Washington, D.C. while her husband served as the U.S. Secretary of the Navy under President Millard Fillmore. During the American Civil War, her husband served as a senator for North Carolina in the Confederate States Congress. Some of her sons served in the Confederate States Army during the war. The family returned to Hillsborough, where they lived at Nash-Hooper House.

Graham died on May 2, 1890 in Raleigh. She was buried in the Hillsborough Old Town Cemetery, adjacent to Hillsborough Presbyterian Church.
