= Denver, North Carolina =

- Census-designated place
- Location within North Carolina Location within the United States
- Coordinates: 35°32′04″N 81°02′02″W
- Country: United States
- State: North Carolina
- County: Lincoln

Area
  - Total: 5.93 sq mi (15.37 km^{2})
  - Land: 5.93 sq mi (15.35 km^{2})
  - Water: 0.0077 sq mi (0.02 km^{2})
- Elevation: 889 ft (271 m)

Population (2020)
  - Total: 2,697
  - Density: 455.0/sq mi (175.68/km^{2})
- Time zone: UTC-5 (Eastern (EST))
  - Summer (DST): UTC-4 (EDT)
- ZIP code: 28037
- Area code: 704
- FIPS code: 37-17000
- GNIS feature ID: 2584315
- Website: http://www.denvernc.com

Denver, formerly known as Dry Pond, is a census-designated place and unincorporated community in Lincoln County, North Carolina, United States. As of the 2020 census, Denver had a population of 2,697.

Known as “Dry Pond” until 1873, it was renamed “Denver” (after the capital of the then territory of Colorado) as a marketing and growth strategy directed towards the emerging railroad industry. The name change was championed by D. Matt Thompson, a local principal. The town was incorporated as such from 1877 until 1971, when the town lost its charter and was reincorporated back into Lincoln County.

== Geography ==
Denver is situated on North Carolina State Highway 16, west of Lake Norman. It is about 25 miles (40 km) north of uptown Charlotte and 15 miles (24 km) southeast of Newton. Denver's northern border is the Catawba County line.

According to the U.S. Census Bureau, the Denver CDP has a total area of 5.9 square miles (15.4 km^{2}), of which 0.01 square miles (0.02 km^{2}), or 0.14%, are water.

Denver's ZIP code is 28037. The elevation is 902 feet (275 m) above sea level.

== Demographics ==
Historical population
Census	Pop.	Note	%±
2010	2,309		—
2020	2,697		16.8%
U.S. Decennial Census

=== 2020 census ===
As of the 2020 census, Denver had a population of 2,697. The median age was 42.0 years. 21.2% of residents were under the age of 18 and 19.2% of residents were 65 years of age or older. For every 100 females there were 89.7 males, and for every 100 females age 18 and over there were 87.3 males age 18 and over.

0.0% of residents lived in urban areas, while 100.0% lived in rural areas.

There were 1,137 households in Denver, of which 28.8% had children under the age of 18 living in them. Of all households, 49.1% were married-couple households, 16.3% were households with a male householder and no spouse or partner present, and 27.4% were households with a female householder and no spouse or partner present. About 29.9% of all households were made up of individuals and 14.6% had someone living alone who was 65 years of age or older.

There were 1,206 housing units, of which 5.7% were vacant. The homeowner vacancy rate was 1.5% and the rental vacancy rate was 3.4%.

Racial composition as of the 2020 census
Race	Number	Percent
White	2,357	87.4%
Black or African American	93	3.4%
American Indian and Alaska Native	14	0.5%
Asian	30	1.1%
Native Hawaiian and Other Pacific Islander	5	0.2%
Some other race	67	2.5%
Two or more races	131	4.9%
Hispanic or Latino (of any race)	156	5.8%

=== 2000 census ===
The census of 2000 for Denver's zip code 28037, shows a total population of 13,030, with a median age of 41 years. The racial makeup was 83.9% White, 5.8% African American, and 1.5% other races. There were 5,052 households, 77.5% being family households. The average household size was 2.56 people. 82.9% of the residents had a high school education or higher, and 20.4% had a Bachelor's Degree or higher.

70.7% of residents over 16 were employed, with 84.7% of those commuting to work alone in a vehicle. The largest employers were Manufacturing at 20.2%, 'Transportation and warehousing, and utilities' at 11.6%, and Construction at 10.0%. The median household income was $52,304. 3.7% of families were below the poverty line. The median house value was $162,000 with 75.8% having a mortgage, contract to purchase, or similar debt.

== History ==
=== Period of foundation ===
The community of Dry Pond derived its name from a small pond, which once stood at what is now the corner of Highway 16 Business and Campground Road, now the site of the local First Federal branch. The pond would dry up in the heat of summer months.

=== 18th century ===
Adam Sherrill and his family first settled in the area in 1747, and they were followed by John Beatty two years later. The actual location of Denver was first settled around 1770. People of Scotch-Irish and German descent from Pennsylvania, were among the first white settlers. Most of the early Scotch Irish were Presbyterians, and their first place of worship in what would become the Denver area was John Beatty's house, which was located about one mile west of Beatty's Ford, near the present-day Triangle community. Now known as Unity Presbyterian, the first meetinghouse for this congregation was originally built of logs. In 1808, it was decided to erect a larger building, and a plot of several acres was conveyed for the purpose by James Little to "James Connor, Alexander Brevard, John Reid and Joseph Graham, trustees." Dr Humphrey Hunter, a native of Ireland and a soldier in the American Revolutionary War, was pastor from 1796 to 1804. Next came Rev. Henry N. Pharr. He was succeeded by Patrick Sparrow, whose father was a potter at Vesuvius furnace, part of the Graham family's local iron industry. Sparrow was the first professor of languages at Davidson College, and afterwards president of Hampden–Sydney College in Virginia. A long-time minister at Unity was Robert Hall Morrison, who was first president of Davidson College.

The Presbyterians were soon joined by early Methodists from Maryland, who initially took up residence near what is now Terrell. Longtime leaders of the Methodists in the region were Rev. Daniel Asbury and Rev. Jeremiah Munday, pioneer Methodist ministers. When he was younger, Asbury traveled to Kentucky with some family members (among them the Callaways) and, along with their leader Daniel Boone, he and approximately 20 people were taken hostage by a band of Shawnee. They were carried to the far northwest (present-day Ohio) and held in captivity for five years. Asbury later was traded to the British in what is now Detroit, and returned to his home in Virginia. In 1791, Asbury established in Lincoln County the first Methodist church west of the Catawba River, which is now known as Bethel United Methodist Church. Rev. Jeremiah Mundy was a native of Virginia and came to Lincoln County in 1799. He was a soldier in the Revolutionary War three years and a minister for 35 years. These Methodists brought with them the institution of "camp meeting", which quickly became one of the most important traditions for the region. Interdenominational from the beginning, the local Rock Springs Camp Meeting grows out of these early meetings and traces its history to 1794, when Daniel Asbury, William McKendree (who would become a bishop), William Fulwood and James Hall, a Presbyterian, held the first gathering near present-day Rehobeth Church in Terrell.

=== Native Americans ===
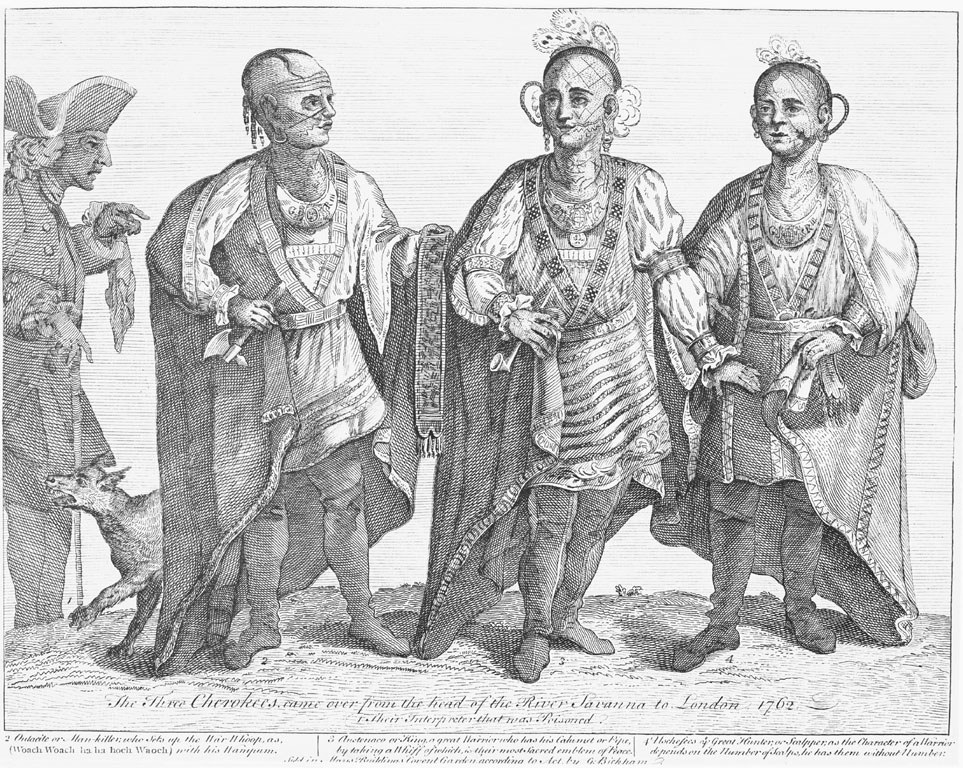
Cherokee people

Most of the land that these Europeans claimed had long been the home of the Catawba and Cherokee people. The Catawba River in this part of North Carolina acted as a border between the two nations, who were often at odds with each other. In the earliest days of European settlement, there were episodes of violence between the Native Americans and the new settlers, and eventually a fort was constructed near present-day Statesville to help provide a level of defense for the western portion of the colony.

=== General William Lee Davidson ===
On February 1, 1781, British forces under the command of Lt. General Cornwallis clashed with North Carolina troops led by Brig. Gen. William Lee Davidson at Cowan's Ford, the southernmost limit of present-day Denver. The British were pursuing Nathanael Greene's forces following the Patriot victory at Cowpens, South Carolina, and Davidson's troops had been sent to stall and harass his advance. With Davidson was Captain Joseph Graham, a local, who had raised 56 cavalrymen. He had promised that those who furnished their own horses and equipment and served six weeks would be considered as having served a tour of three months.

Local blacksmiths made 45 rough swords for the new mounted troops. Only fifteen of Graham's troops had pistols, but all had rifles, not the ideal weapon for horseback fighting. Davidson, charged with guarding four of the Catawba River crossings, had sent 500 troops to Beattie's Ford, keeping only 25 at Cowan's. But the river was high and Cornwallis did not have access to his heavy guns. Led by a local Tory guide, Frederick Hager, the British began to cross the river early as the Americans were still sleeping. The sentry was not alerted until Cornwallis' troops were within 100 yards of the shore. The battle began, and the strong current was on the American's side. Greatly outnumbered, the local forces were able to hold their own, slowly falling back into the woods while returning fire. The British finally took the ford and advanced. General Davidson was shot, and the militia, seeing this, fled. Major Graham's cavalry covered their retreat. The battle had helped a larger force under the command of Daniel Morgan reach the Yadkin River unopposed. It is said that Frederick Hager was the man who shot the gun that killed General Davidson.

=== 19th century ===
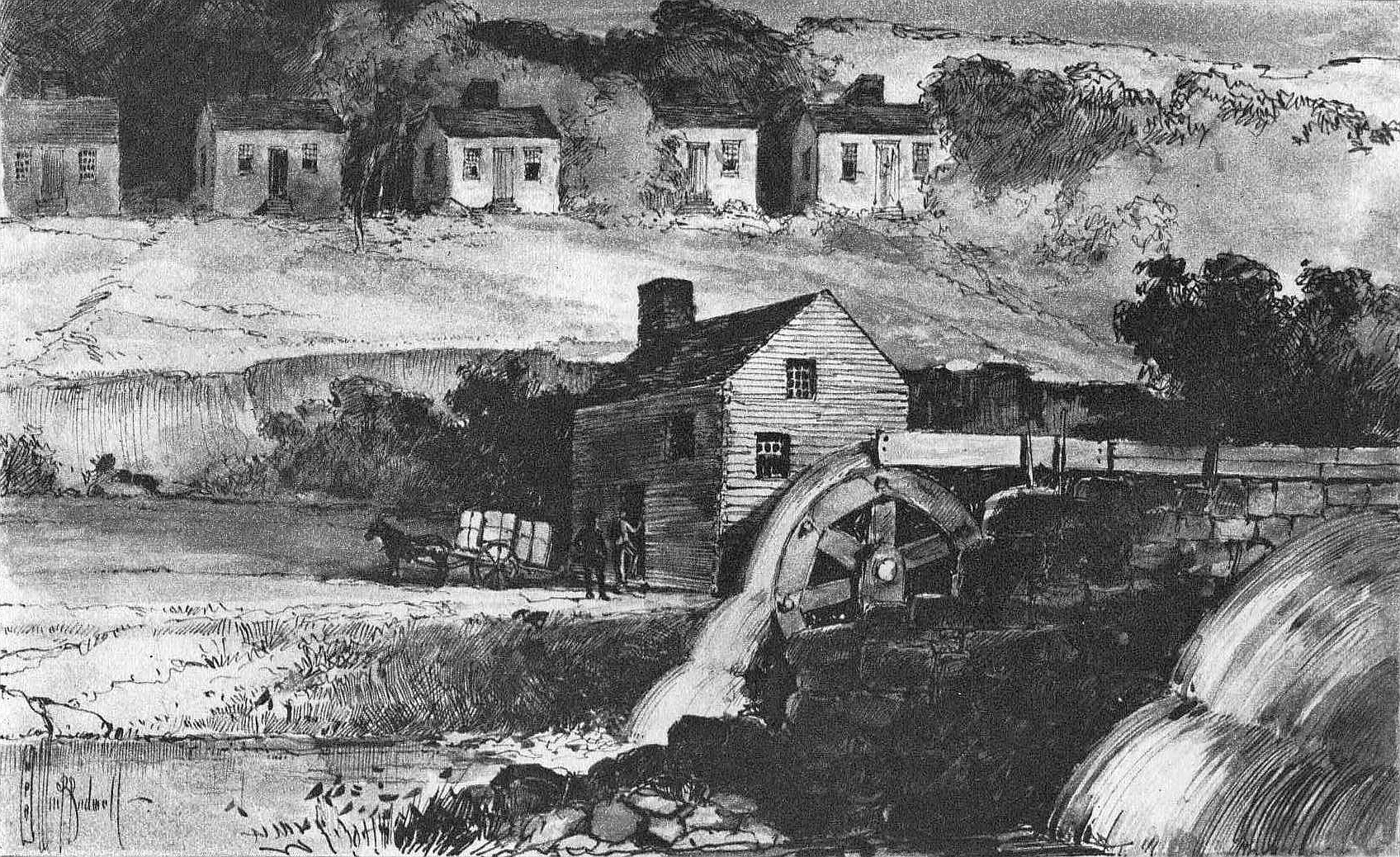
Etching of the Lincolnton Cotton Mills in 1813, the first cotton mill in North Carolina

Most of the early settlers were subsistence farmers who relied heavily upon hunting to supplement their tables. Grist mills and saw mills were among the first local industries, but the production of iron soon became the biggest industry for the area. By 1810, Lincoln County boasted six ironmaking operations, including Vesuvius, Mt. Welcome, Mount Tirzah, Mount Carmel, High Shoals, and Madison. A number of individuals and partners took the lead in establishing ironworks in eastern Lincoln County, most just to the west of present-day Denver, near Pumpkin Center and in the direction of Iron Station. The partnership of Peter Forney, Joseph Graham, John Davidson, and Alexander Brevard was responsible for the construction of Vesuvius Furnace in 1795. Peter Forney built Madison Iron Furnace along Leeper's Creek in 1809. These two sites, like other local ironworks, changed hands at various points. Other individuals involved in the development of the iron industry in Lincoln County include Turner Abernethy, John Fulenwider, Dr. William Johnston, Jonas W. Derr, and J.F. Reinhardt. James Madison Smith later erected Stonewall Furnace in 1862 to help meet the demand for iron brought on by the Civil War. Operations at Rehoboth (begun in the 1820s) and Madison furnaces also resumed during the turbulent years from 1862 to 1865 to supply much-needed iron for the Southern war effort.

=== Dry Pond ===
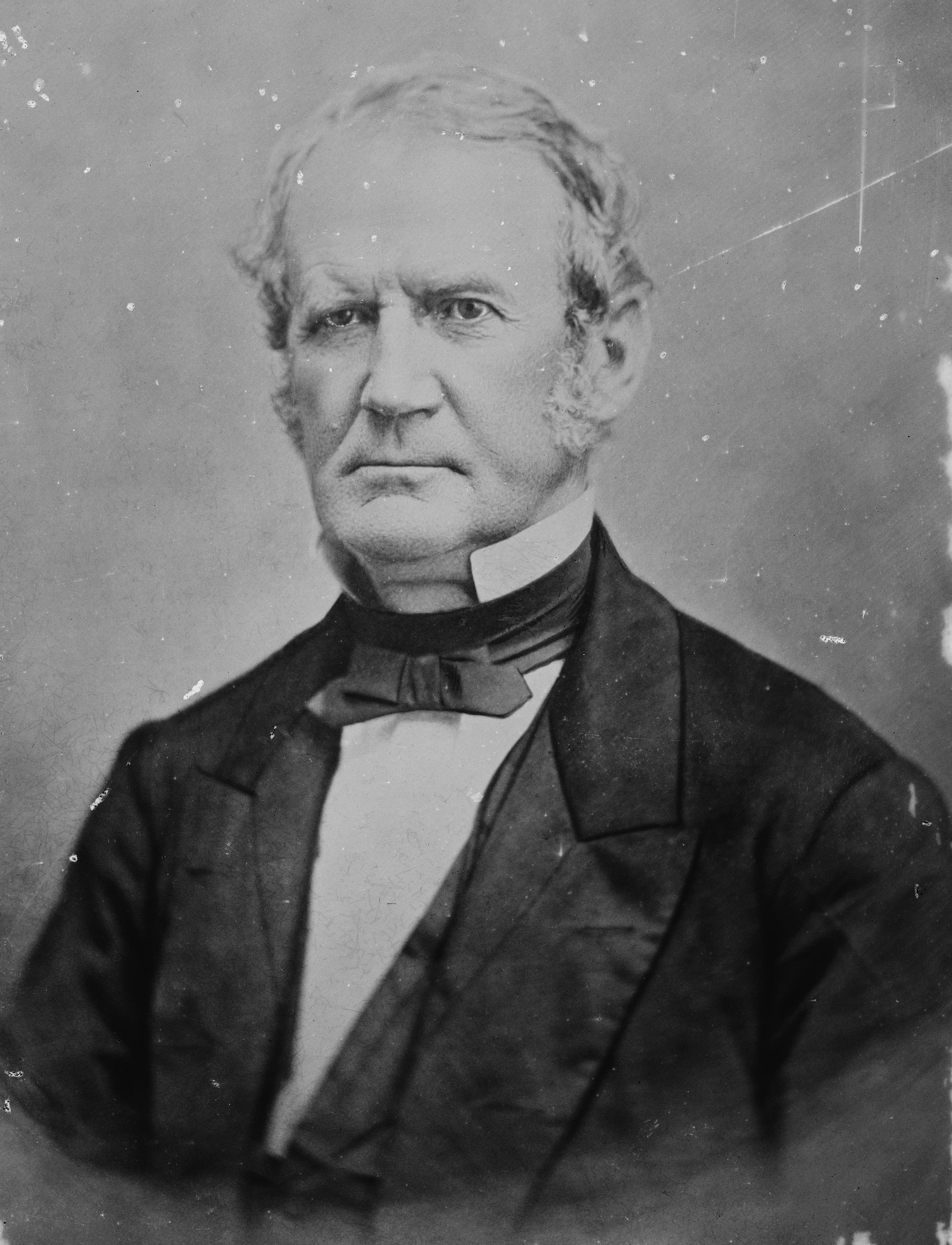
William Alexander Graham (1804–1875), a Denver native who was a United States senator from North Carolina from 1840 to 1843, governor of North Carolina from 1845 to 1849, and United States Secretary of the Navy from 1850 to 1852.

There was a Dry Pond Post Office beginning right before the Civil War, although it moved across the line to Catawba County near what is now Kiestler's Store Road in December 1868. In 1873, in an attempt to attract a railroad spur and thinking that the moniker "Dry Pond" didn't present a nice enough image for the railroad planners, headmaster of the local Rock Springs Academy, D. Matt Thompson, led the effort to have Dry Pond renamed for the capital of Colorado, which was just then petitioning for statehood.

In the years before the Civil War, North Carolina's wealthy class in need of a break from the summer heat, could escape to Lincoln County's Catawba Springs resort. The popular antebellum destination, named for the Catawba people formerly living in the area, was built amidst seven mineral springs near Denver. Guests vacationed there as early as the 1790s. In 1824, geology professor Denison Olmstead recommended the waters of the springs for complaints concerning the liver and weakness. There is little evidence that healing actually occurred; nonetheless Catawba Springs became a popular stop on the stagecoach lines from Salisbury to Asheville.

Revolutionary War veteran and state legislator Captain John Reid was the first known proprietor of Catawba Springs. After his death in 1821, the spa passed through a series of owners: Charles Jugnot, William Simonton, and Joseph Hampton. In 1838, Hampton renovated and expanded Catawba Springs, including the construction of a two-story, 100-room hotel. After the renovation, during parties and on holidays, as many as 500 guests assembled on the porch of the hotel. Before that time, the spa could only accommodate sixty to seventy guests in its cabins. Most guests were members of the southern planter class from North and South Carolina. Among the names of prominent North Carolina families listed in the hotel records are the Grahams, Brevards, Alexanders, Caldwells, Davidsons, and Polks. Some guests made their way to the spa from Mississippi, Alabama, and Louisiana. Students from nearby Davidson College could also be found enjoying themselves there on the weekends. During the early 1840s, Peter S. Ney ran a school for boys at the resort known as Stewart's Seminary.

=== American Civil War ===
During the Civil War, the local area raised two units for the Confederacy. In March 1862, a group of local men, most of whom were related, formed a company known as the "Dry Pond Dixies" (Company G, 52nd regiment of North Carolina Troops) and joined the Confederacy. Added to their number were a number of Quakers from Randolph County, who did not fight but tended the wounded. The second group was known as the Beatty's Ford Rifles (Company K 23rd Regiment).

The Civil War put an end to the southern planter aristocracy, and with its patron base depleted, Catawba Springs closed in the mid-1860s. As North Carolina recovered from the war, railways and eventually good highways, led to the opening of mountain resorts. A similar, but unrelated, resort operated under the name "Sparkling Catawba Springs" in Catawba County during the latter part of the 19th and early 20th century. The buildings were demolished in 1930, and the springs now bubble invisibly into a farm pond. A faint, lingering scent of sulfur is all that remains.

=== Town incorporation ===
In October 1874, Denver's first postmaster, John A. Kids, was appointed. Mail to the Catawba Springs post office was transferred to the Denver post office the next year. Two years later, the community was incorporated as a town by the state of North Carolina. Unfortunately for the citizens of the area, the railroad chose not to run through the growing small town, and it began to dry up like the pond for which it was originally named.

For much of its existence, "downtown" consisted of a few houses, a handful of stores, a couple of churches, a school, a barber shop, a post office, a bank, and a cotton gin. The 1902 Soil Survey map of the Hickory, North Carolina area, shows Denver having a small grid of streets running along what are now Highway 16 Business and Campground Road. By 1914, the soil survey map of Lincoln County showed only a grid of three short streets running northwest to southeast parallel to what is now Highway 16 Business and one street running parallel to Campground Road (which still exists and was called by locals for many years "Back Street"). Apparently, one of the short streets perpendicular to Campground Road ran beside what is now the telephone building on St. James Church Road, and another of these perpendicular streets connected to what is now Campground Road right at the Rock Springs Campground. Another part of the "street grid" for Denver was Cemetery Road. It ran beside Denver United Methodist Church and was perpendicular to Highway 16, then turned in front of the community cemetery and intersected with Campground Road. The portion that ran beside the church and perpendicular to the highway was "graded under" by the church in the late 1990s.

For a brief period during the 1890s–1910s, Denver was home to small-scale gold prospecting, particularly in the area near the former Triangle School and the community now known as Westport.

=== 20th century to present ===
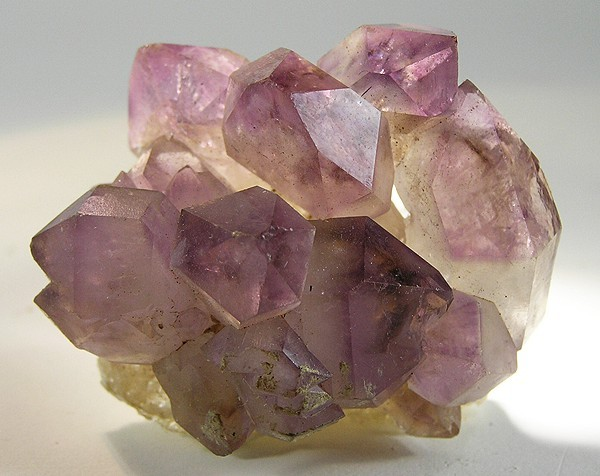
Amethyst specimen from the Reel Mine, Iron Station

Denver remained largely a farming community, with cotton as the primary cash crop supplemented by "truck farming" vegetables to area towns (with tomatoes and strawberries being among the most often marketed vegetable crops). Members of local families began commuting to work in textile mills in the surrounding communities of Mooresville, Lincolnton, Cornelius, Maiden, and Mount Holly just before World War II, and continued up until the early 1970s. Having failed to elect a local government for many years, Denver lost its official incorporated status in 1971 by vote of the state legislature.

It was the filling of a much larger pond, Lake Norman, that led Denver to grow in ways that its early boosters probably could have never fathomed. In 1962, Duke Power built the Cowans Ford Dam, flooding the fertile farmland along the Catawba River "bottoms", the land which had attracted the area's first settlers. Soon, weekend and summer "getaway" homes began to appear lakeside, and after a few years, these were replaced by more luxurious lake homes, as individuals began to move to the area to live near the water. Denver is now largely a bedroom community for Charlotte, which is 25 miles (40 km) to the south.

One of Denver's major features is its "main street", which is now known as Old Highway 16. This road, once State Highway 16, was one of North Carolina's first state highways, receiving that designation in 1928. Present-day Highway 16 is a four-lane road running along the southwest edge of the community.

During the 1970s, the town hosted one of the largest cross-country motorcycle races in the nation, the "Denver 100", which was a successful fundraiser for the local volunteer fire department. Participants rode through the center of barns, along creek banks, and through pastures—most of which have now disappeared under various housing developments.

Up until recently, most African Americans in the area lived in the community known as "Little Egypt", which is the general area near East Lincoln High School along Saint James Church Road.

Denver is home to the Rock Springs Campground that has been the site of revivals and camp meetings since 1794.

Major local industries included modular home builder R-Anell Homes, which recently moved from Denver to a manufacturing facility in Cherryville.

=== National Register of Historic Places ===
The William A. Graham Jr. Farm, Munday House, and Rock Springs Camp Meeting Ground are listed on the National Register of Historic Places.

== Transportation ==
NC 16

- NC 16 – There are two NC 16's that go from northwest to southeast in Denver. The NC 16 going through town is referred to by locals as "Old 16" or "16 Business", while the outer route has higher speed limits and is known as "New 16" or "16 Bypass".
- NC 150 – This highway intersects NC 150 at the northwest corner of Denver and leads to Mooresville to the east and Maiden and Lincolnton to the west.

== Parks ==
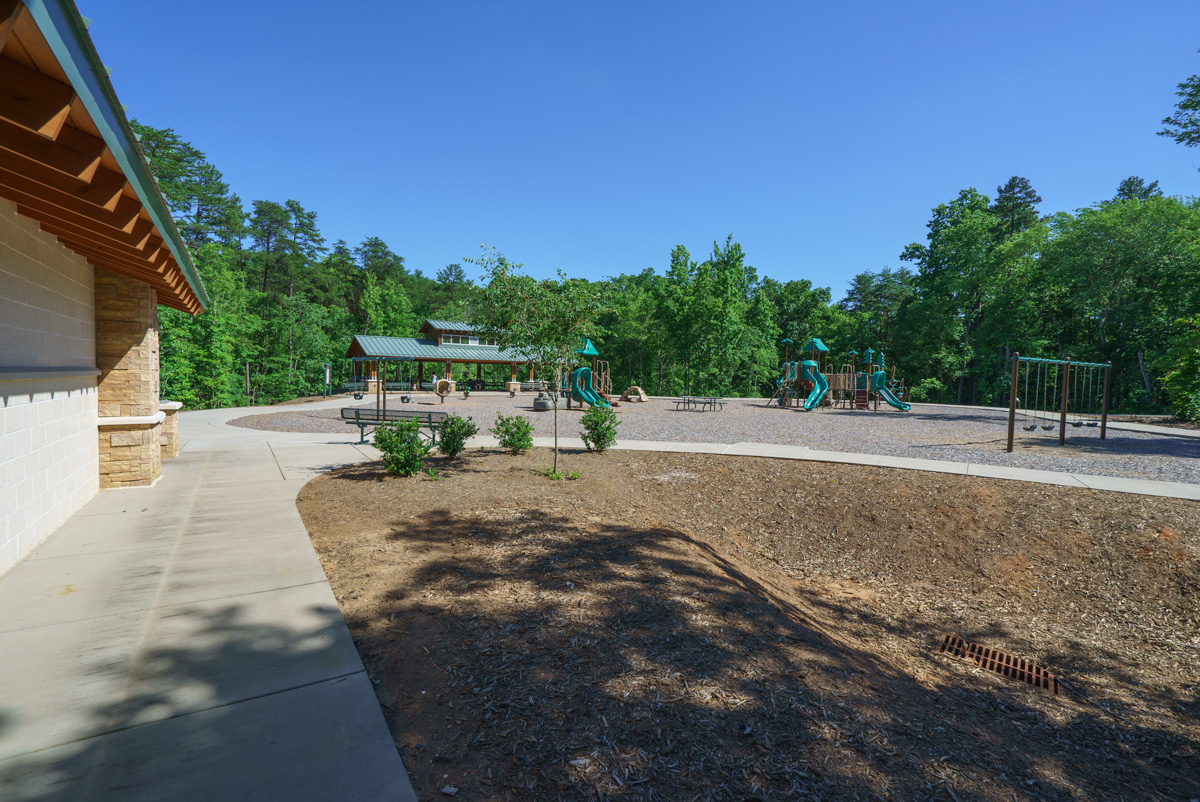
Rock Springs Nature Preserve

- Beatty's Ford Park (includes boat access for Lake Norman) – This park includes a picnic shelter, restrooms, disc golf, a walking trail, a volleyball court, horseshoe pits, a splash pad area during summer months, two children's playgrounds, and an outdoor fireplace.
- Rock Springs Nature Preserve - This newer park in Denver includes a picnic shelter, a large children's playground area, a partially paved .4 mile trail with a newly carved extended trail through the woods, the trail includes an outdoor classroom and amphitheater.
- Rescue Squad Park - Another newer park includes several playing fields, large picnic shelter, modern children's playground, Hilly Trail with 9 Basket Disc Golf Course and is home to Denver's Farmer's Market on Saturdays 8am-12pm (during warmer months).

== Education ==
Rock Springs Academy, one of the original schools in the community, evolved into Rock Springs School, which was a comprehensive 1–12 school until nearby East Lincoln High School was built in 1967. At that time, Rock Springs became an elementary school. The original mascot for Rocks Springs was "The Warriors", and the school colors were black and gold; in the 1990s, this was changed to "sailors". The mascot for East Lincoln High School is "The Mustangs", and the school colors are orange and green with the hues changing slightly over the years. The spring for which the academy was named lies near the Rock Springs Campground on Campground Road.

High schools

- East Lincoln High School
- North Lincoln High School (in Lincolnton)

Middle schools

- East Lincoln Middle School (in Iron Station)
- North Lincoln Middle School

Elementary schools

- Catawba Springs Elementary School
- Rock Springs Elementary School
- St. James Elementary School

Charter schools

- Lincoln Charter School (K–12)
- West Lake Preparatory Academy (K–8)

Closed schools include:

- Triangle Elementary School – also known as Rock Springs 2 Elementary School (property sold to the Holy Spirit Catholic Church in 1988)

== Events ==
Town festivals have included the annual Strawberry Festival held in May and the Denver Days festival held every September. Each year, Denver hosts its annual Camp Meeting at the Rock Springs Campground in the summer, and has done so since 1794. A Farmers' market is held on Saturdays from mid-April through September at Rock Springs Elementary School.

The East Lincoln Betterment Association hosts its annual Christmas Parade in Denver every first Saturday of December. The parade route is generally north along NC Business 16 from Hagers Ferry Rd. and ends just before the intersection of Unity Church Rd. and NC Business 16.

== Notable people ==
- Kyle Busch (1985-2026), two-time NASCAR Cup Series champion
- Matt Carter (born 1981), stock car racing driver
- Tony Cloninger (1940–2018), former MLB pitcher and long-time pitching coach for the New York Yankees
- William Alexander Graham (1804–1875), former U.S. senator, governor of North Carolina, and U.S. Secretary of the Navy
- Jamie Hacking (born 1971), AMA motorcycle racer
- Kevin Keck (born 1973), writer
- Jeremy Mayfield (born 1969), NASCAR Cup Series driver
- Matt McCall (born 1981), NASCAR driver, engineer and crew chief
- Ryan Repko (born 1999), stock car racing driver
- John Reiser (1938–2005), race car driver and businessman
- Keith Rodden (born 1981), NASCAR crew chief
- Paul Silas (1943–2022), NBA player and coach
- Chazz Surratt (born 1997), NFL linebacker, Super Bowl LX champion with the Seattle Seahawks
- Sage Surratt (born 1998), American professional football tight end
- Holland Thompson (1873–1940), history professor, pioneered study of the industrializing post-Civil War South
- Gracie Trotter (born 2001), stock car racing driver

== See also ==
- Mountain Air Cargo, a company having its headquarters here
