= Vesuvius Furnace (Catawba Springs, North Carolina) =

Historic house in North Carolina, United States

- U.S. National Register of Historic Places
- Location within North Carolina Location within the United States
- Location: On SR 1382, N of NC 73, near Catawba Springs, North Carolina
- Coordinates: 35°29′31″N 81°5′0″W
- Area: 9.9 acres (4.0 ha)
- Built: 1790, 1792, 1810-1820
- NRHP reference No.: 74001359
- Added to NRHP: August 13, 1974

Vesuvius Furnace is a historic home and iron furnace located between Denver and Iron Station, Lincoln County, North Carolina. The house was built in two sections the older dated to about 1792, with the western section added about 1810–1820. It is a two-story, five bays wide and two deep, frame structure with a one-story shed porch. The furnace was built in 1790, and is constructed of large stone blocks of random sizes, but about half of the square pyramidal structure has fallen down. The furnace is about 20 feet high and is filled with dirt, debris, and vegetation. Vesuvius Furnace was established by General Joseph Graham, who was one of the chief leaders in the 18th and early 19th century production of iron in Lincoln County, and was the father of governor and as secretary of the navy William Alexander Graham.

It was listed on the National Register of Historic Places in 1974.

In 2009 the home was privately restored and opened as Vesuvius Vineyards, a wine vineyard and wedding venue.
