= Rock Springs Camp Meeting Ground =

- Rock Spring Camp Ground (Note: Originally listed on the National Register as the "Rock Springs Camp Meeting Ground". The name as listed was changed at the same time as a boundary increase in 2017.)
- U.S. National Register of Historic Places
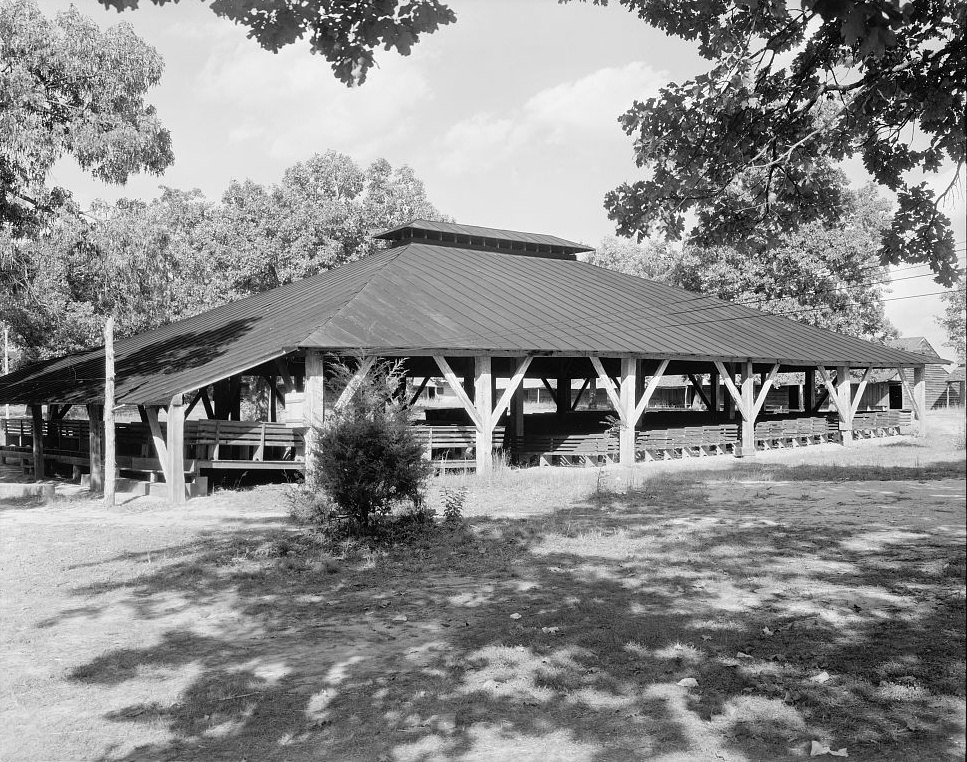
- Carnegie Survey Photo of tabernacle, 1938

- Location within North Carolina Location within the United States
- Location: 6831 Campground Rd. Denver, North Carolina
- Coordinates: 35°32′25″N 81°1′40″W
- Area: 8 acres (3.2 ha)
- Built: 1832
- NRHP reference No.: 72000970 (original); 100000899 (increase)

Significant dates
- Added to NRHP: September 22, 1972
- Boundary increase: April 17, 2017

Rock Springs Camp Meeting Ground is a historic Methodist camp meeting ground located near Denver, Lincoln County, North Carolina. The arbor was built in 1832, and is a rectangular open structure with a deep hipped roof and ventilation cap at the apex. It has a raised platform with a pine pulpit and seating for 1,000. The property has 288 numbered wooden "tents" placed in two and a partial third concentric ring around the arbor. Tent No. 1 is believed to date to the early-1830s. Rock Springs Camp Meeting Ground is the earliest camp meeting organization in North Carolina.

It was listed on the National Register of Historic Places in 1972.
