= Montrose (Hillsborough, North Carolina) =

Historic district in North Carolina, United States

- U.S. National Register of Historic Places
- U.S. Historic district
- U.S. Historic district – Contributing property
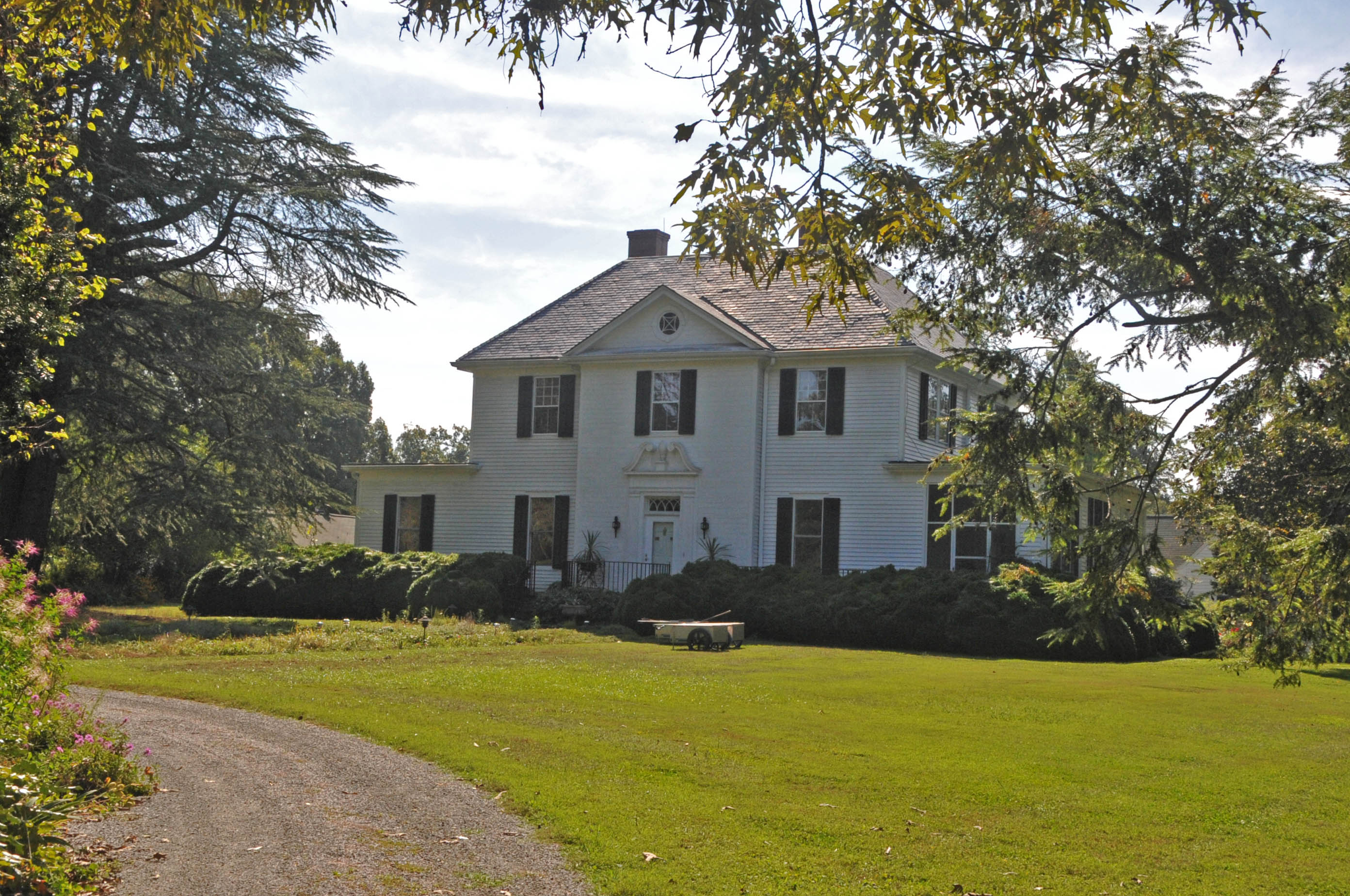
- Montrose, March 2007

- Location within North Carolina Location within the United States
- Location: 320 St. Mary's Rd., Hillsborough, North Carolina
- Coordinates: 36°04′41″N 79°08′36″W
- Area: 61 acres (25 ha)
- Built: 1842, 1900, 1948
- Architect: Thomas Paxton; George Watts Carr
- Architectural style: Colonial Revival, Federal
- NRHP reference No.: 01001187
- Added to NRHP: October 28, 2001

Montrose is a historic estate and national historic district located at Hillsborough, Orange County, North Carolina. The estate was once owned by North Carolina Governor William Alexander Graham and Susannah Sarah Washington Graham. The main house was built about 1900 and remodeled in 1948. It is a two-story, three-bay, double-pile frame dwelling with a high-hip, slate-covered roof, and flanking one-story wings. It features a Colonial Revival style pedimented entrance pavilion with a swan's neck pediment. Also on the property are the contributing William Alexander Graham Law Office (1842, c. 1893) with Federal style design elements, garage (1935), kitchen (c. 1845), smokehouse (c. 1830), pump house (1948), tractor shed (1948), animal shelter (1948), barn (c. 1830-1845) and the landscaped gardens (c. 1842-1977).

It was listed on the National Register of Historic Places in 2001. It is located in the Hillsborough Historic District.
