= Mary Claire Engstrom =

American writer and historian (1906–1997)

Mary Claire Randolph Engstrom
- Born: October 1, 1906; Kansas City, Missouri, US
- Died: May 20, 1997 (aged 90); Hillsborough, North Carolina, US
- Spouse: Alfred G. Engstrom

Academic background
- Education: University of North Carolina

Academic work
- Institutions: Harvard University & Yale University
- Main interests: historical documentation of Hillsborough

Mary Claire Engstrom (October 1, 1906 – May 20, 1997) was an American writer and historian. She is best known for her active role in preserving historic buildings in the town of Hillsborough, North Carolina.

== Biography ==
Engstrom was born in Kansas City, Missouri, and was the daughter of Lester L. Randolph and Florence Alberta Toynbee Randolph. She earned a PhD at the University of North Carolina in English literature in 1939, and did postdoctoral research at Harvard and Yale, specializing in 18-century satire.

With her husband, Alfred G. Engstrom (1907–1990), a professor of French at the university, she purchased the historic Nash-Hooper House in Hillsborough.
