= George A. Schastey =

American cabinet maker and decorator

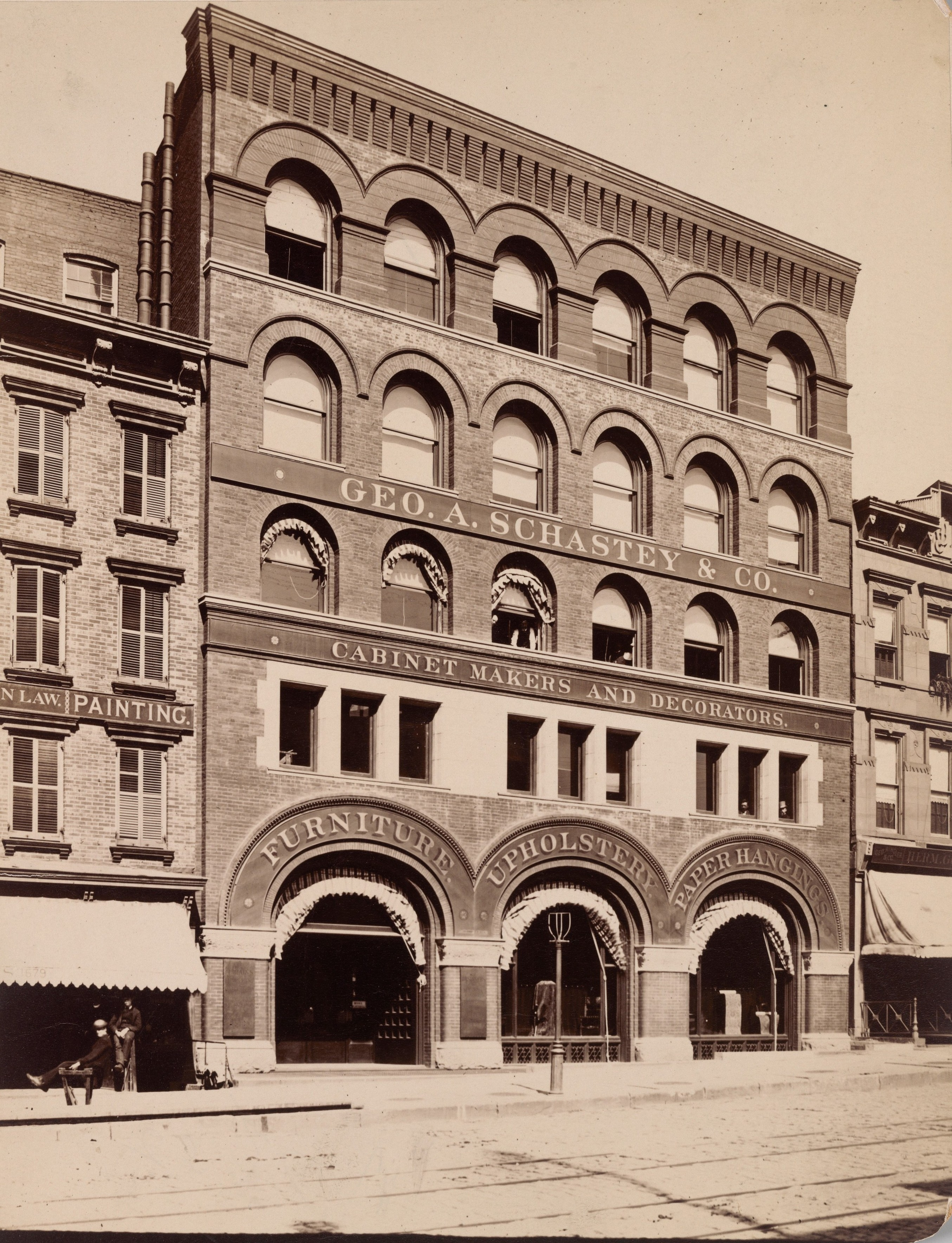
Facade of the George Schastey & Co. showroom, 1681–1683 Broadway, near West Fifty-Third Street (ca 1885) (actual location of the Broadway Theatre)

George A. Schastey (1839–1894) was an American Gilded Age cabinet maker and decorator.

== Early life ==
Schastey was born in Merseburg, Germany (then Prussia), and immigrated to New York with his family in 1849. He was apprenticed as an upholsterer, and served in the Civil War.

== Career ==
Moorish-style reception room commissioned by Arabella Worsham in 1881 for her townhouse at 4 West Fifty-Fourth Street in New York City, Brooklyn Museum.

After the War he worked for a number of cabinetmakers, including the Herter Brothers. He opened a factory of his own in 1873. He created lavish interiors for the wealthy in New York as well and in San Francisco on Nob Hill. His clients included the "Big Four" railroad magnates, Leland Stanford, Mark Hopkins, Jr., Charles Crocker, and Henry E. Huntington. He designed the William J. Graham House in Reno, Nevada.

Schastey's work is exhibited at the Metropolitan Museum of Art and the Brooklyn Museum in New York, and Virginia Museum of Fine Arts in Richmond, among others.

== Gallery ==
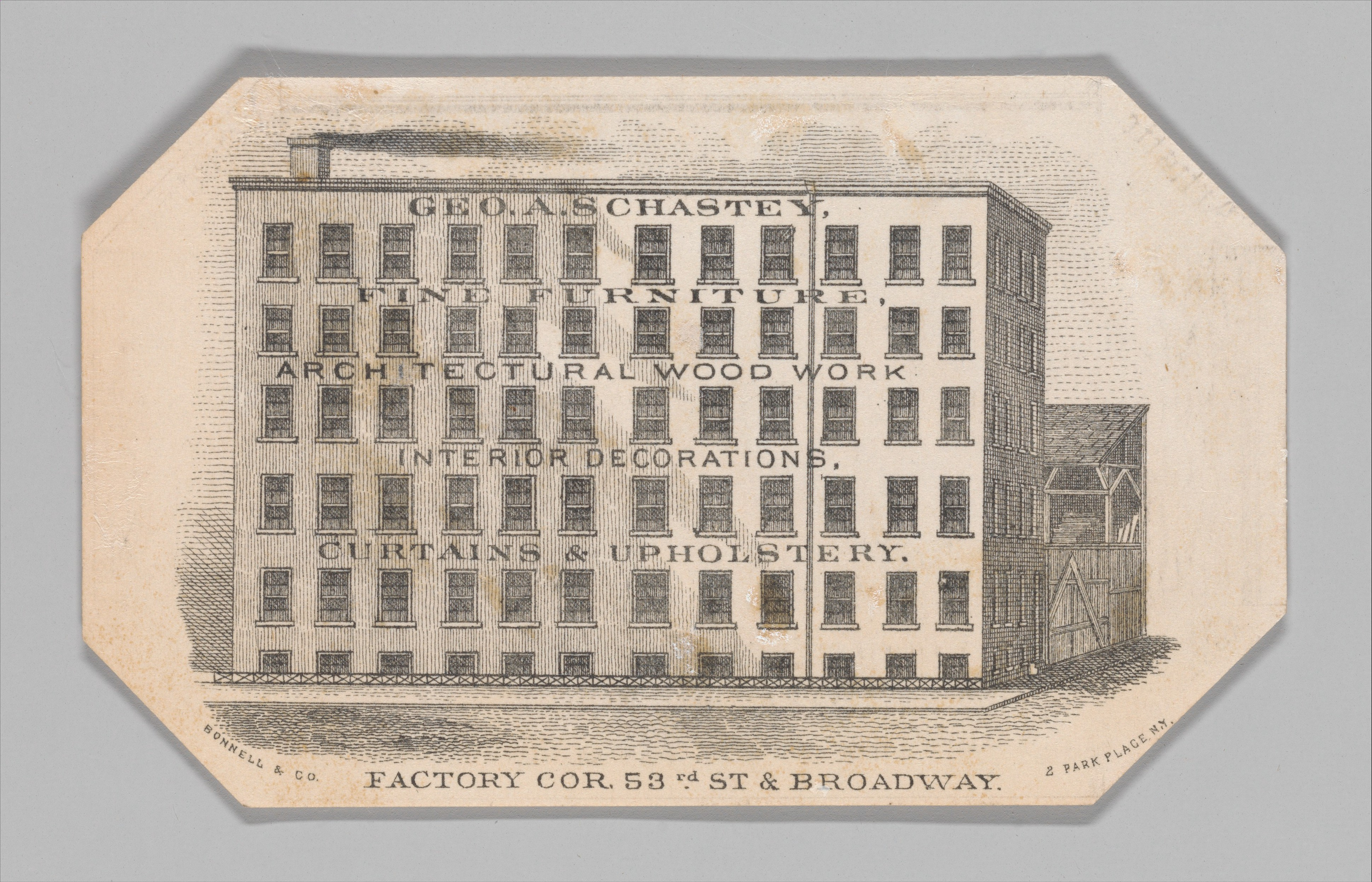
Schastey’s newly constructed manufactory, located at 228 West Fifty-Third Street, on a trade card, 1876–79

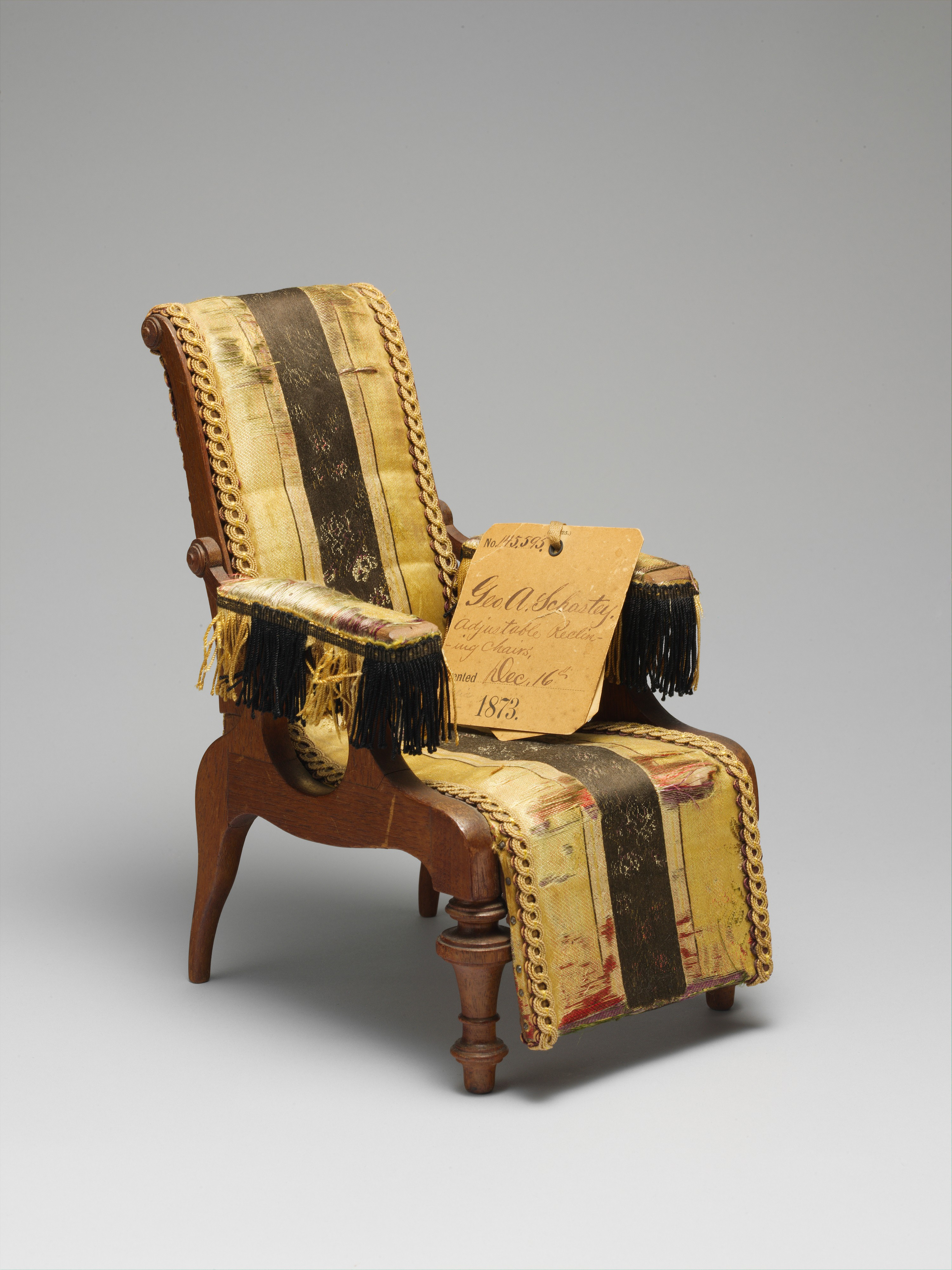
Patent model for adjustable reclining chairs, 1873

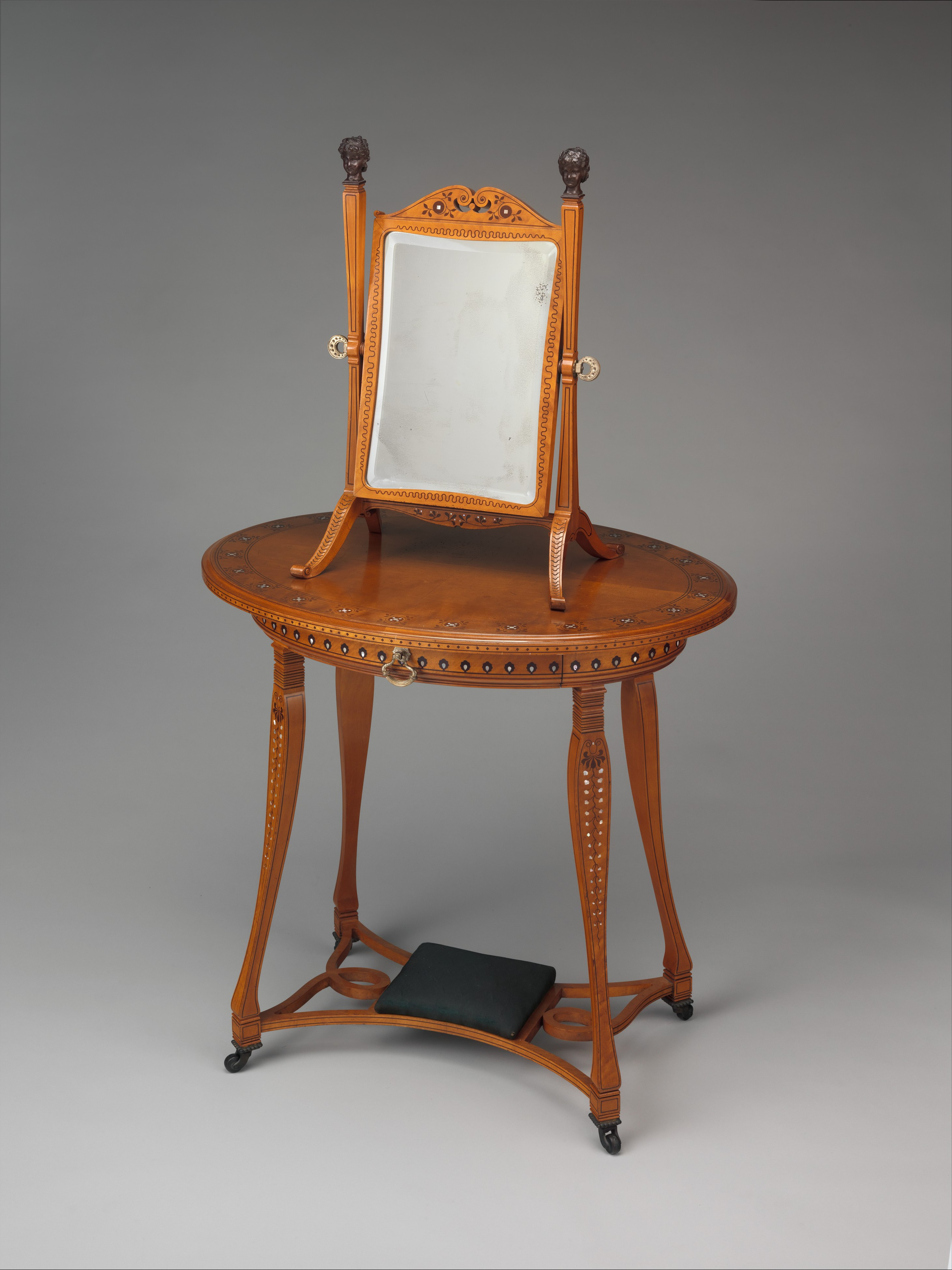
Dressing table, 1881-1882

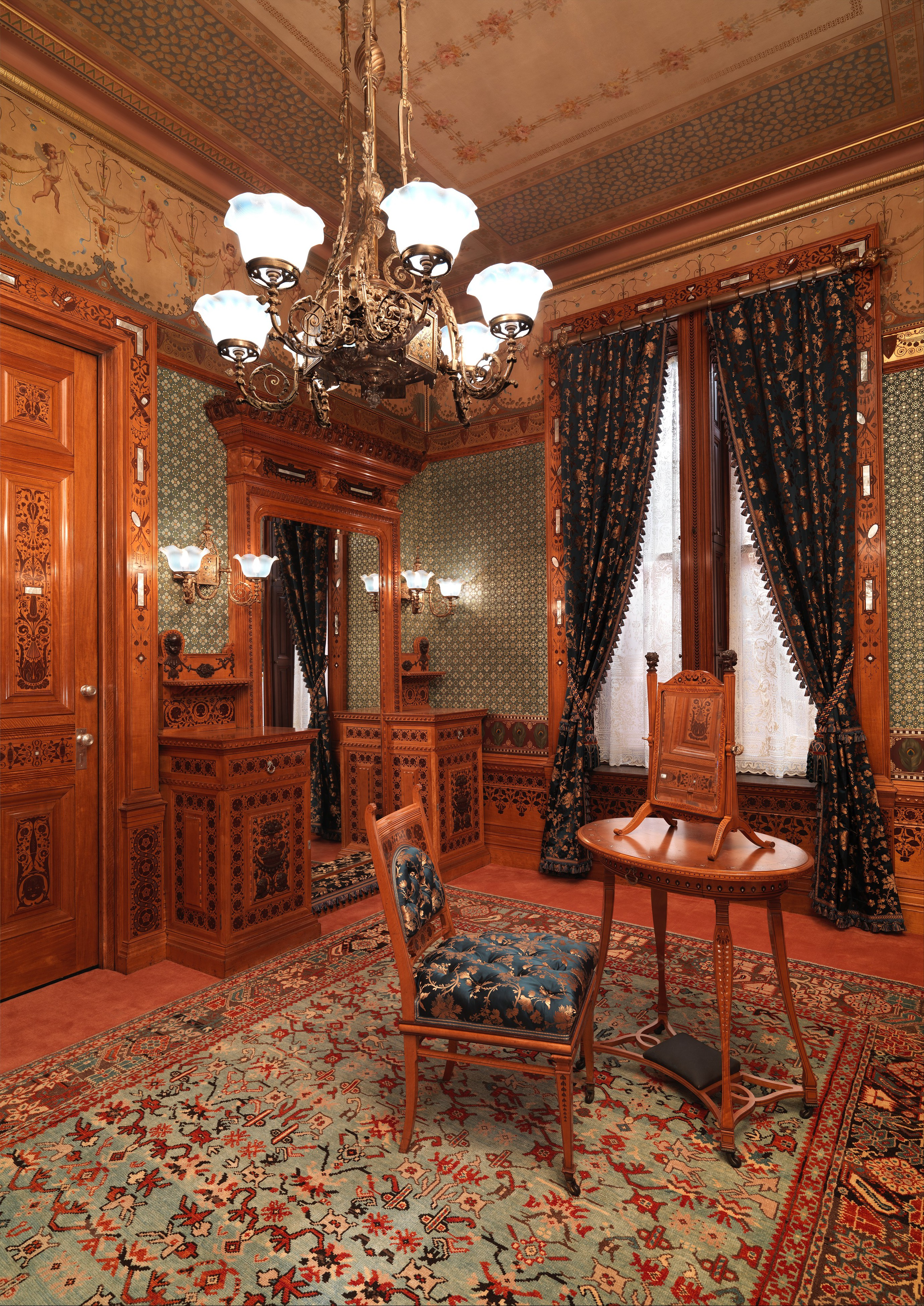
Architectural woodwork, panelong and furniture designed by Schastey, 1881-1882

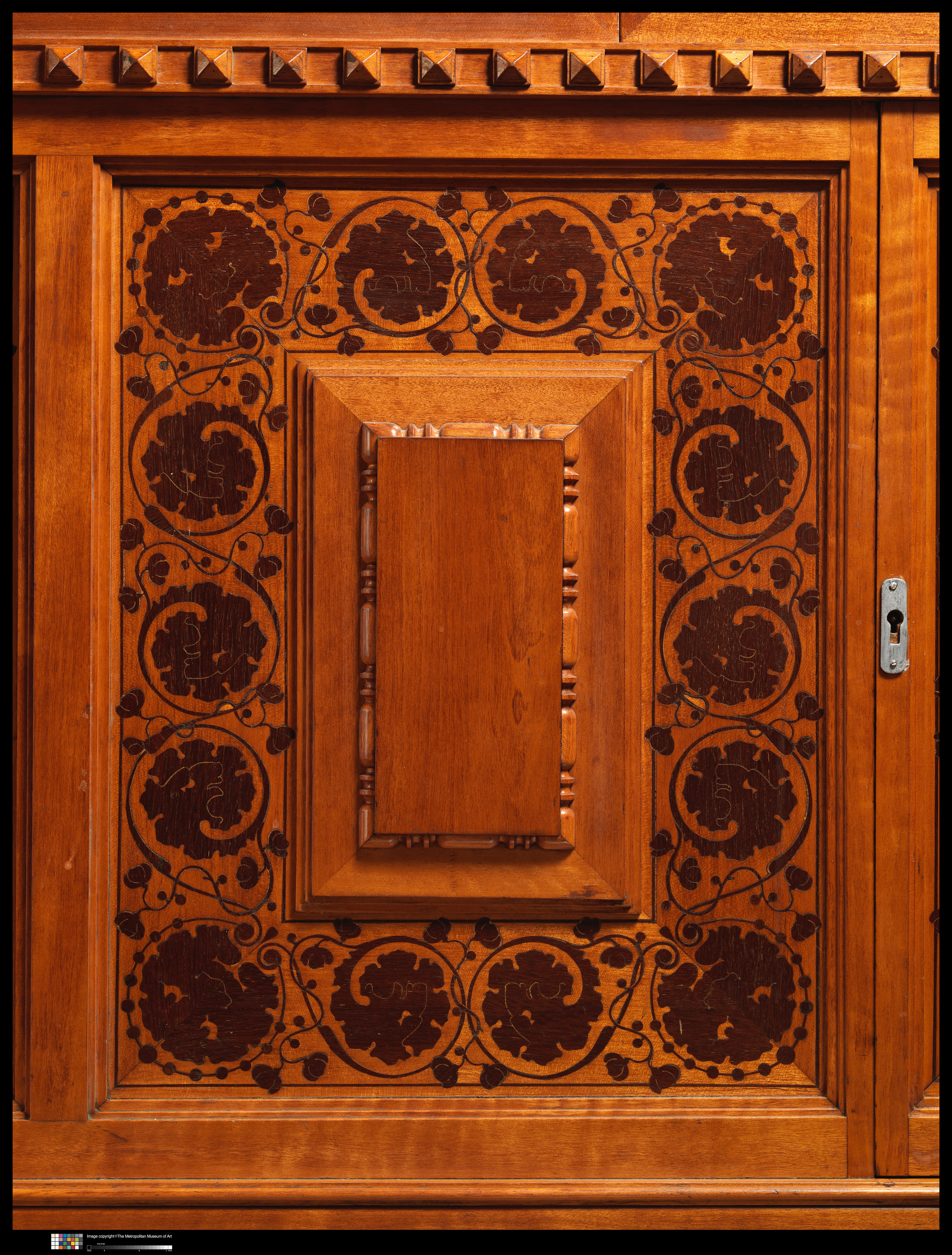
Panel, 1881-1882

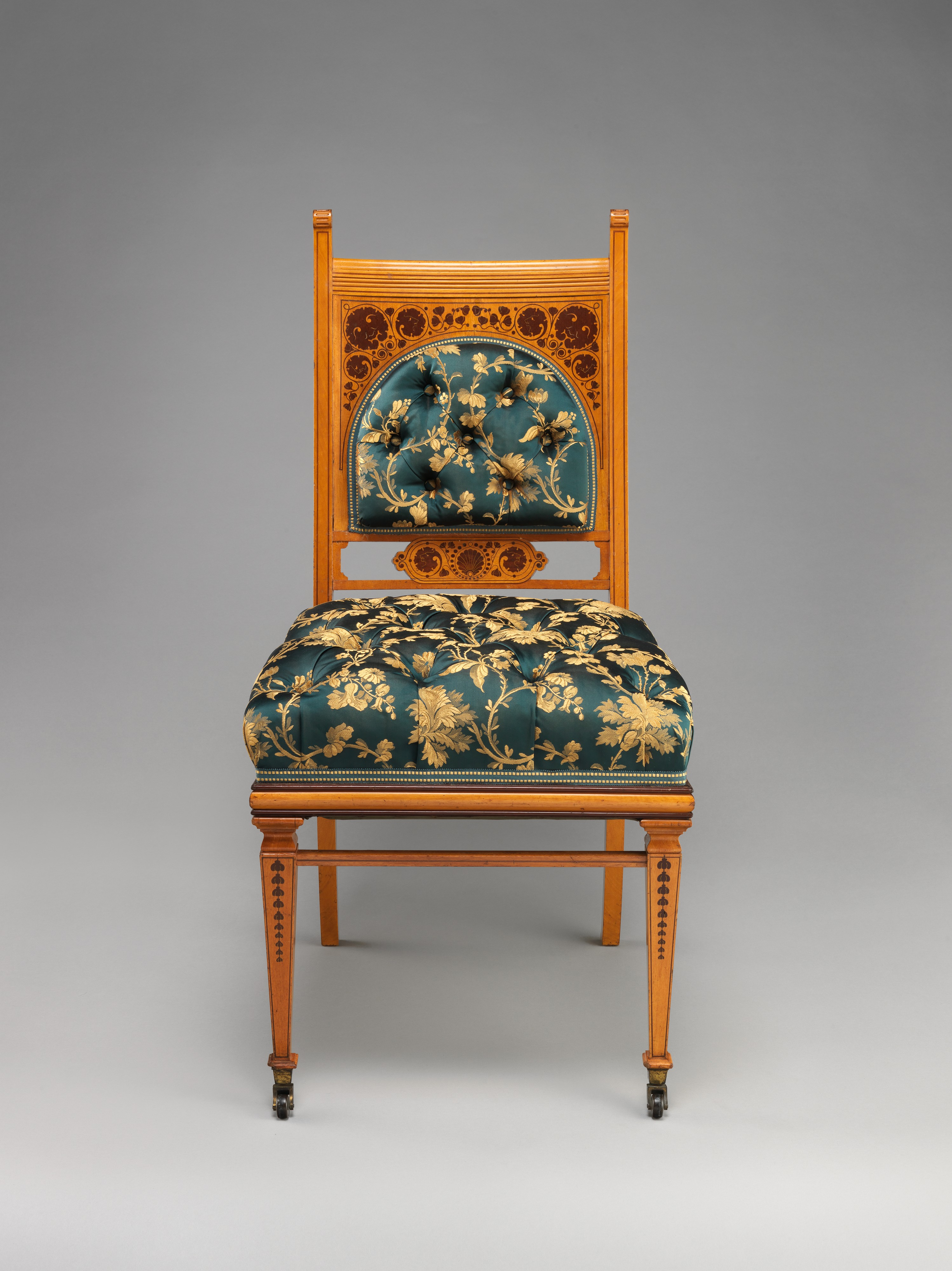
Side chair, 1881-1882

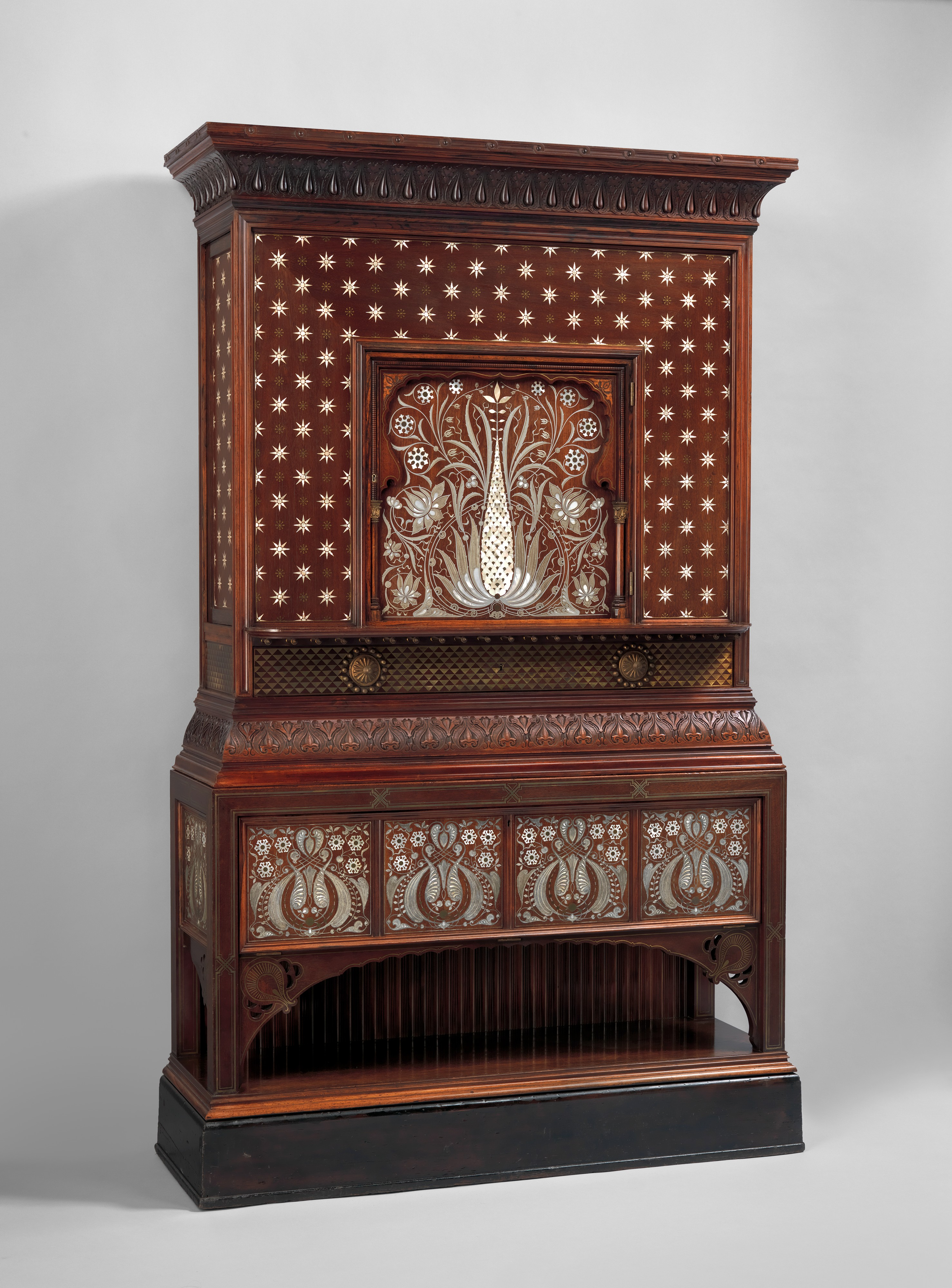
Large cabinet, 1884-1885
