= William A. Graham (agriculture commissioner) =

American politician

William Alexander Graham
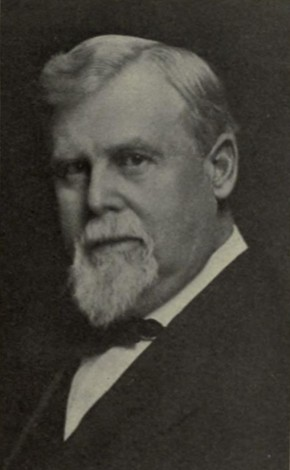

8th North Carolina Commissioner of Agriculture
- In office 1909 – December 1923
- Governor: William W. Kitchin; Locke Craig; Thomas W. Bickett; Cameron A. Morrison
- Preceded by: Samuel L. Patterson
- Succeeded by: William A. Graham III

Member of the North Carolina House of Representatives
- In office 1905–1905

4th President pro tempore of the North Carolina Senate
- In office 1879–1880
- Preceded by: James L. Robinson
- Succeeded by: William T. Dortch

Member of the North Carolina Senate
- In office 1879–1880
- In office 1874–1874

Personal details
- Born: December 26, 1839 Hillsborough, North Carolina, US
- Died: December 23, 1923 (aged 83) Raleigh, North Carolina, US
- Party: Democratic
- Parent(s): William Alexander Graham; Susannah Sarah Washington
- Education: University of North Carolina at Chapel Hill; Princeton College

Military service
- Allegiance: Confederate States
- Branch/service: Confederate States Army
- Rank: Major
- Unit: 19TH North Carolina State Troops Cavalry
- Battles/wars: American Civil War

William Alexander Graham Jr. (December 26, 1839 – December 23, 1923) was a North Carolina legislator and state Commissioner of Agriculture.

== Biography ==
Graham was born on December 26, 1839 in Hillsborough, North Carolina, to William Alexander Graham (1804–1875) and Susannah Sarah Washington. Graham was educated at Horner Military Academy, the University of North Carolina at Chapel Hill, and Princeton College. He served as an officer in the Confederate Army during the Civil War. Graham became a farmer and led the North Carolina Farmers' Alliance. A Democrat, he was elected to represent Lincoln County in the North Carolina Senate in 1874 and 1879 and in the North Carolina House of Representatives in 1905. In 1879 to 1880, Graham served as President pro tempore of the North Carolina Senate. From 1899 to 1908, Graham was a member of the state Board of Agriculture.

In 1908, Graham was elected Commissioner of Agriculture. He was re-elected several times and served until his death in December 1923. His son, William Graham Jr., succeeded him as Commissioner.

Graham died in Raleigh, North Carolina, on December 23, 1923, days before his 84th birthday.

The William A. Graham Jr. Farm was listed on the National Register of Historic Places in 1977.

Party political offices
Preceded by Samuel L. Patterson	Democratic nominee for North Carolina Commissioner of Agriculture; 1908, 1912, 1916, 1920	Succeeded by William A. Graham III
Political offices
Preceded by Samuel L. Patterson	8th North Carolina Commissioner of Agriculture; 1908 – 1923	Succeeded by William A. Graham III
Preceded by James L. Robinson	4th President pro tempore of the North Carolina Senate; 1879 – 1880	Succeeded by William T. Dortch
