= James Graham House =

- U.S. National Register of Historic Places
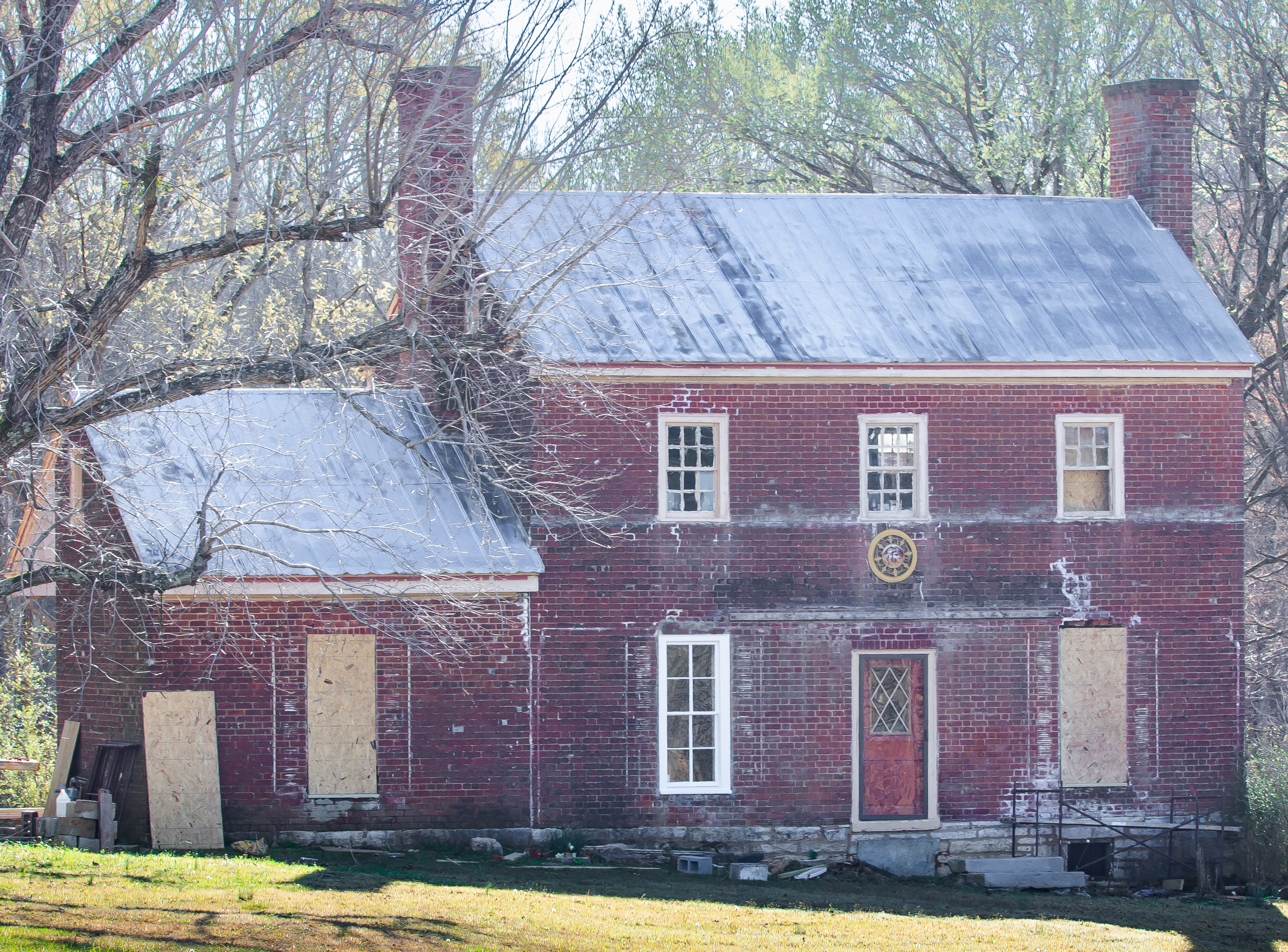

- Location within Tennessee
- Location: 2221 Airport Savannah, Tennessee
- Coordinates: 35°09′39″N 88°13′02″W
- Area: 8 acres (3.2 ha)
- Built: 1822
- Built by: Graham, James
- Architectural style: I-house w/ Federal influence
- NRHP reference No.: 91001594
- Added to NRHP: October 29, 1991

The James Graham House, in Hardin County, Tennessee near Savannah, Tennessee, was built in 1822. It was listed on the National Register of Historic Places in 1991.

It is an I-house with Federal influence.

The original owner operated a grist mill on Horse Creek nearby.
