= William A. Graham Jr. Farm =

Historic farm in North Carolina, US

- U.S. National Register of Historic Places
- Location within North Carolina Location within the United States
- Location: S of Denver on SR 1360, near Denver and Kidville, North Carolina
- Coordinates: 35°28′43″N 81°4′5″W
- Area: 9.9 acres (4.0 ha)
- Built: c. 1890
- NRHP reference No.: 77001004
- Added to NRHP: May 6, 1977

William A. Graham Jr. Farm is a historic home and farm located near Denver and Kidville, Lincoln County, North Carolina. The farmhouse was built about 1890, and is a two-story, three-bay, rectangular frame dwelling. The front facade features a large central gable with ornate gable ornaments. Also located on the property is a two-story, 16-sided, "round barn" with a low, polygonal roof that radiates from an eight-sided blind cupola; log outbuilding; and a smokehouse. The property was the working experimental farmstead after the American Civil War of William A. Graham, Jr. (1839–1923), son of governor and statesman William Alexander Graham (1804–1875).

It was listed on the National Register of Historic Places in 1977.
