= Graham–Ginestra House =

Historic house in Illinois, United States

- U.S. National Register of Historic Places
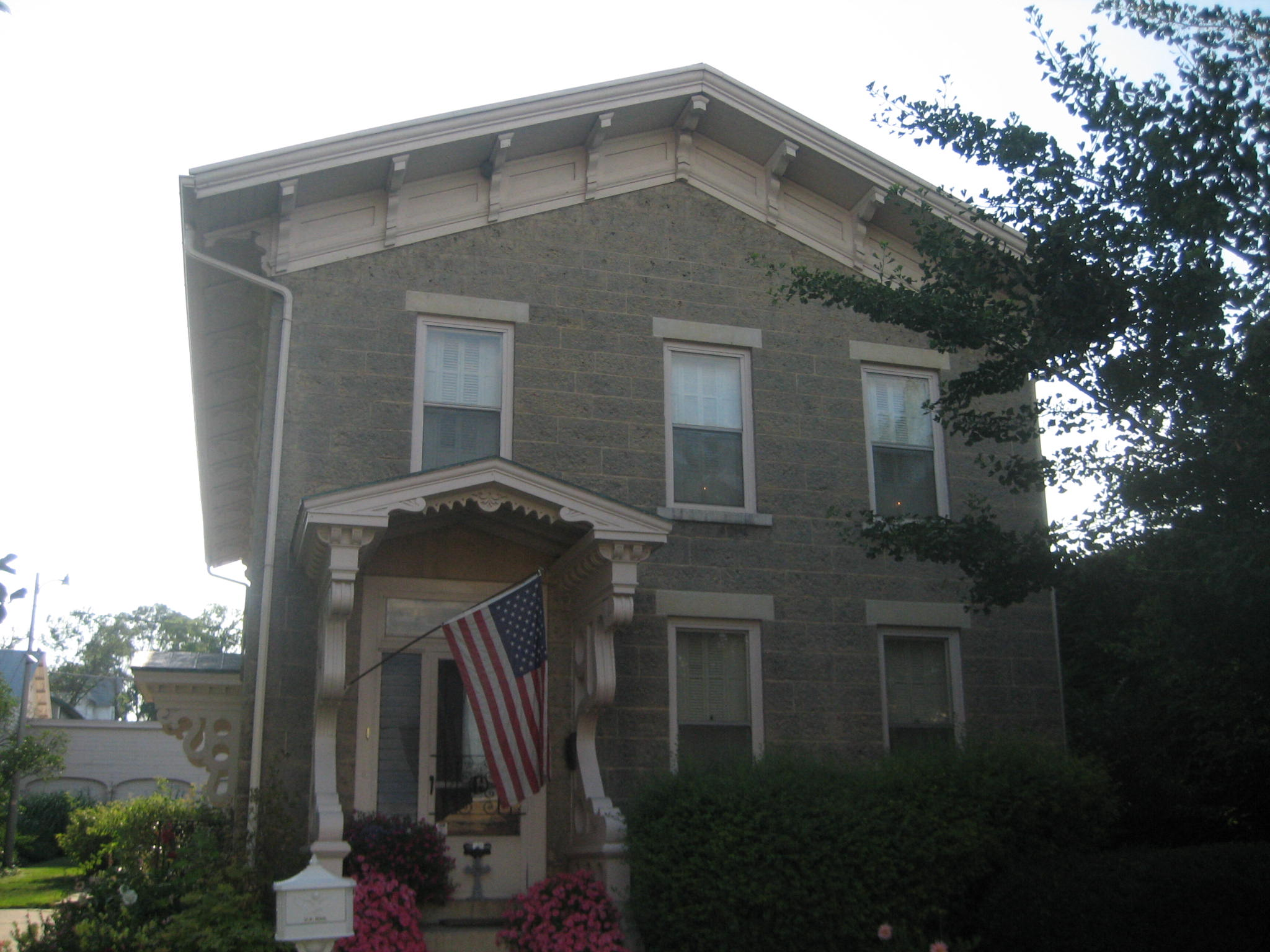

- Location within Illinois Location within the United States
- Location: 1115 S. Main St., Rockford, Illinois
- Coordinates: 42°15′42″N 89°6′2″W
- Area: less than one acre
- Built: 1857
- Architectural style: Greek Revival, Italianate
- NRHP reference No.: 79000879
- Added to NRHP: June 11, 1979

The Graham–Ginestra House is a historic residence in Rockford, Illinois, United States.

== History ==
Freeman Graham Sr. was a prominent businessman in Connecticut who served in the Connecticut General Assembly. He came to Rockford, Illinois to manage Emerson, Talcott & Company, a farm implements manufacturer in the Water Power District. He had been apprenticed in the cotton and woolen trades in the East. Graham built the first sour mash distillery in Illinois. He also co-owned the Rockford Cotton Mills. He had a home constructed in 1857 so that it would be about halfway between the two businesses (at 202 South Main and 1602–08 South Main, respectively). This made him one of the first settlers on the southwest side of Rockford. He was elected Fifth Ward Alderman in Rockford. Graham died in 1896, and his business interests were split among his three sons.

The house was instead bequeathed to his daughter, Julia, and her husband Henry S. Warner. Warner was the secretary-treasurer of the Graham Match Company. They lived in the house until 1927, when they sold it to Sicilian immigrant Leo Ginestra. Ginestra, a mechanic who owned a mobile home park, was part of the Italian community that formed in the city in the 1920s. The former Ginestra house was located in the middle of the community's commercial thoroughfare. Ginestra lived here until his death in 1978. For its role showcasing the cultural history of Rockford, the house was recognized by the National Park Service with a listing on the National Register of Historic Places on June 11, 1979.

== Architecture ==
The two-story rectangular house was built with Galena dolomite limestone. The house shows influence from the Italianate and Greek Revival styles.
