= Cong. James M. Graham House =

Historic house in Illinois, United States

- U.S. National Register of Historic Places
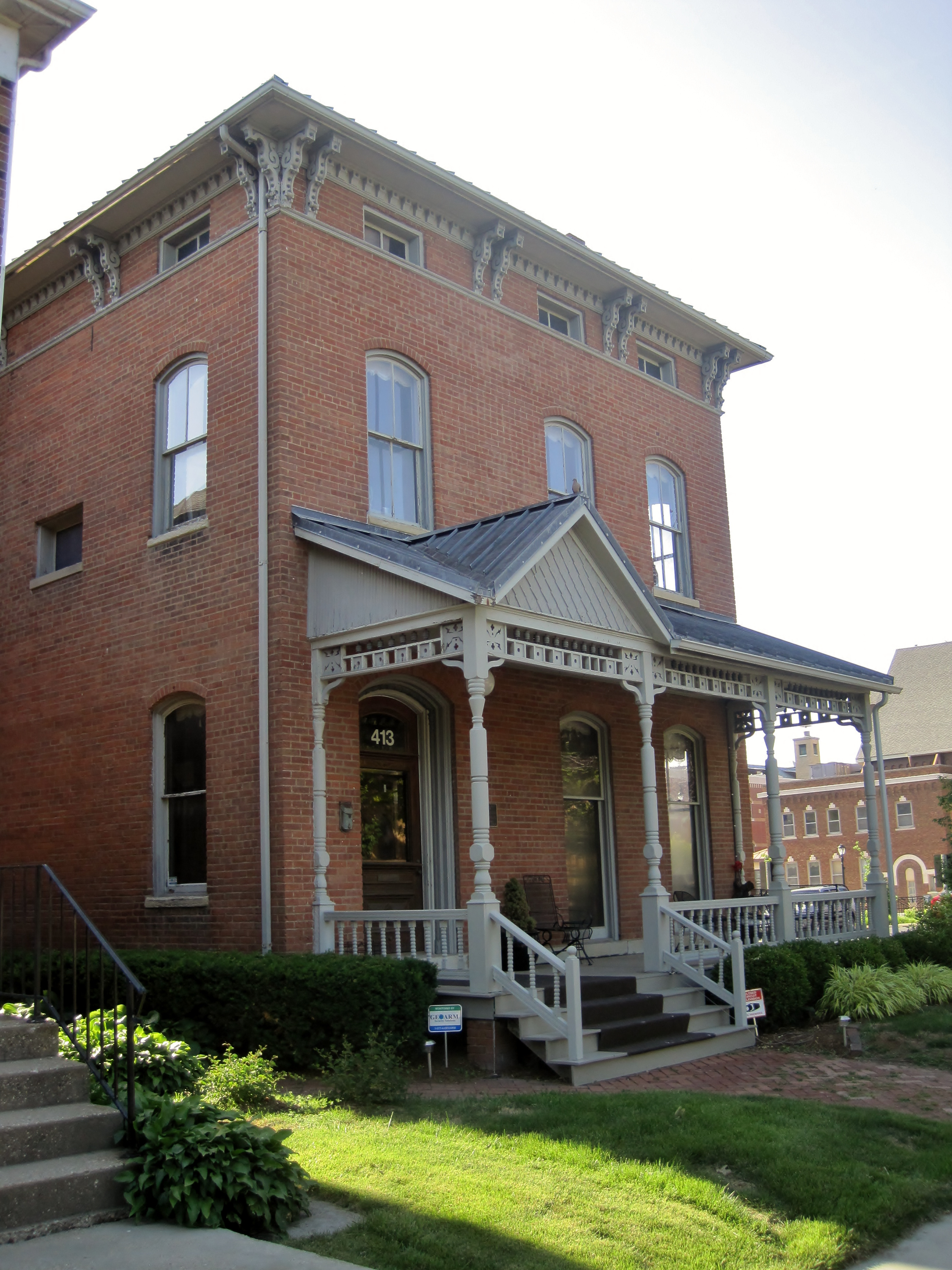

- Location within Illinois Location within the United States
- Location: 413 S. 7th St., Springfield, Illinois
- Coordinates: 39°47′52″N 89°38′48″W
- Area: 0.2 acres (0.081 ha)
- Architectural style: Italianate
- NRHP reference No.: 89000342
- Added to NRHP: May 1, 1989

The Cong. James M. Graham House is a historic house located at 413 South 7th Street in Springfield, Illinois. The two-story Italianate house was the home of U.S. Representative James M. Graham from 1896 until his death in 1945. Graham, who served in the House from 1909 to 1915, played a part in several important Congressional investigations. He wrote the minority opinion in Congress's investigation of the Pinchot–Ballinger controversy, in which he condemned Secretary of the Interior Richard Ballinger for appropriating public lands for private use. Graham also participated in fraud investigations into the Bureau of Indian Affairs, one of which led to the resignation of then-Commissioner of Indian Affairs Robert G. Valentine.

The house was added to the National Register of Historic Places on May 1, 1989.
