= Robert Graham House =

Historic house in Delaware, United States

- U.S. National Register of Historic Places
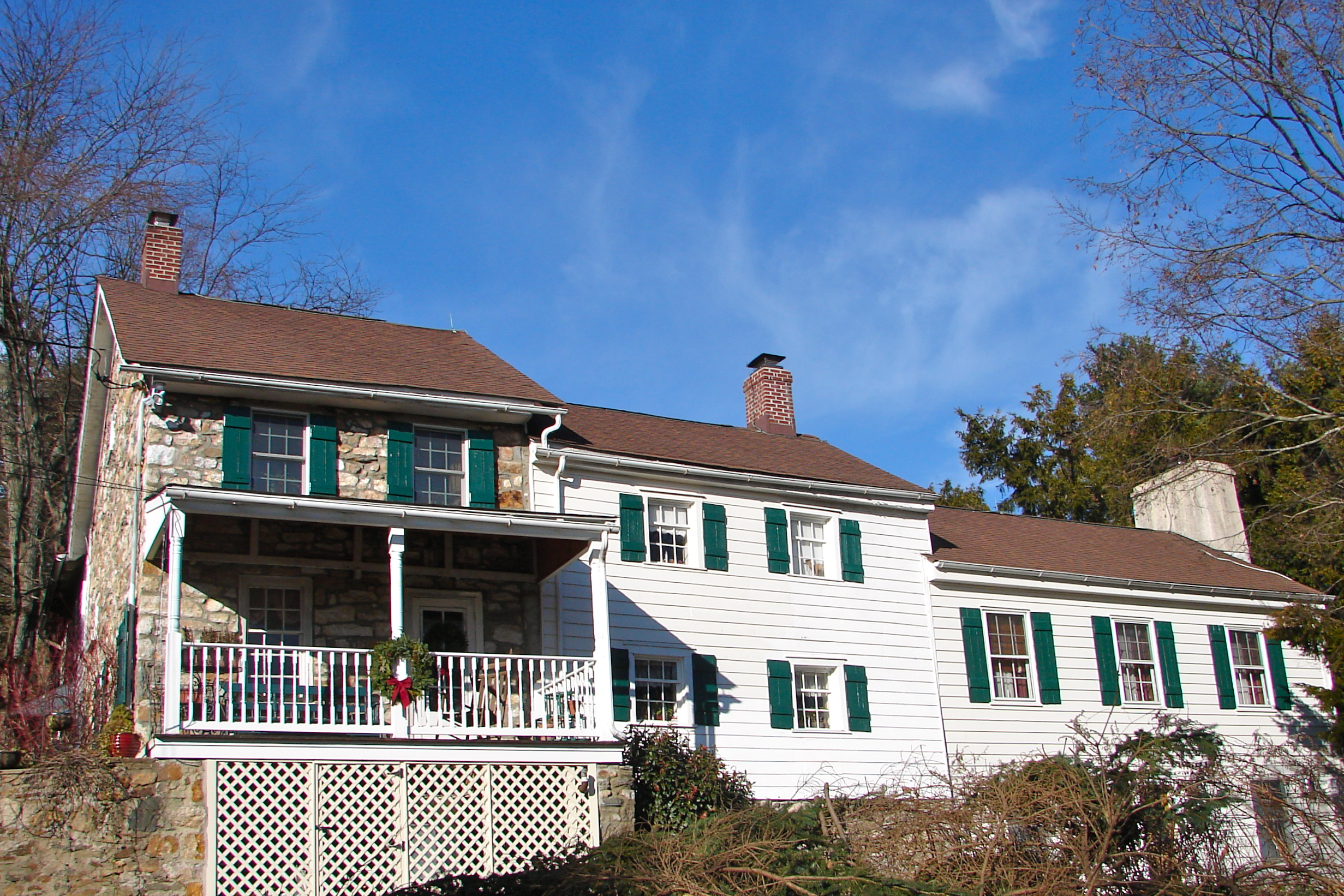
- Robert Graham House, December 2010

- Location within Delaware Location within the United States
- Location: 751 Crossan Rd., near Newark, Delaware
- Coordinates: 39.756317°N 75.732542°W
- Area: 1.9 acres (0.77 ha)
- Built: 1790
- Architect: Frederick, William
- Architectural style: Colonial Revival, Log Construction
- NRHP reference No.: 97000835
- Added to NRHP: August 1, 1997

Robert Graham House is a historic home located near Newark, Delaware, United States. The house consists of sections built during three main periods. The log, central core dates to about 1790, and was first constructed as a one-story building with a loft and later raised to a full two stories. The two-story, stone western section was added about 1819. The final building period occurred in the mid-1930s with two frame additions, a two-story, frame, rear wing behind the stone section, and a one-story, frame wing east of the log section, with a three-car garage at the basement level. Because the house is banked into the hill, a full three levels of the stone end, including the basement, are exposed. The stone section features a shed-roofed, front porch on a high stone foundation. Also on the property are a contributing stone terrace (c. 1947) and a stone wall from the mid-1930s.

It was added to the National Register of Historic Places in 1997.
