= William J. Graham House =

Historic house in Nevada, United States

- U.S. National Register of Historic Places
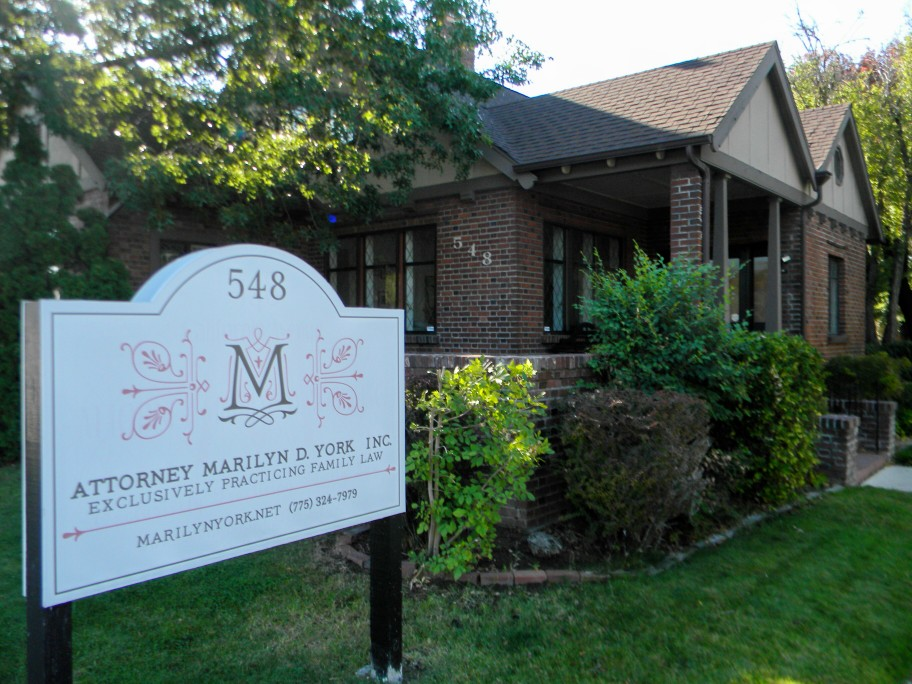

- Location within Nevada Location within the United States
- Location: 548 California Ave., Reno, Nevada
- Coordinates: 39°31′12″N 119°49′3″W
- Area: less than one acre
- Built: 1928
- Built by: Schastey, George A.
- Architectural style: Tudor Revival
- NRHP reference No.: 83001117
- Added to NRHP: March 7, 1983

The William J. Graham House, at 548 California Ave. in Reno, Nevada, United States, is a historic Tudor Revival house that was built in 1928. It was designed by George A. Schastey. It was listed on the National Register of Historic Places (NRHP) in 1983.

It was deemed significant primarily for its association with William J. Graham—who had it built and lived there 40 years—who was "a major figure in the history of Nevada gaming, who also was prominent in other colorful aspects of 20th century Nevada history," according to its NRHP nomination. He was a developer of casinos and a redlight district, a bootlegger, and a fight promoter—including of the 1931 Baer-Uzcudun fight.

The house is also notable for its well-preserved craftsmanship.
