= William H. H. Graham House =

Historic house in Indiana, United States

- U.S. National Register of Historic Places
- U.S. Historic district – Contributing property
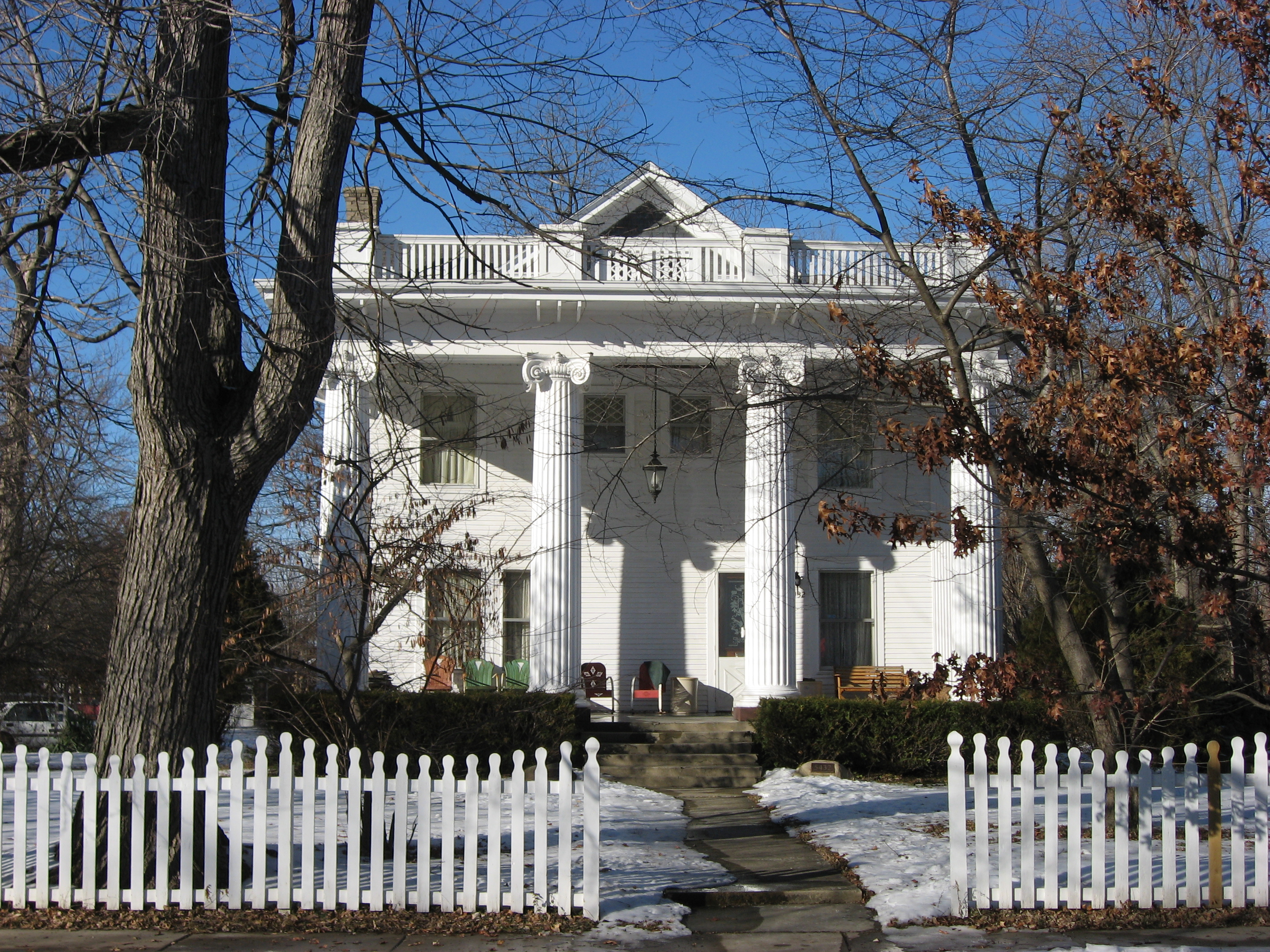
- William H. H. Graham House, February 2011

- Location within Indianapolis Location within Indiana Location within the United States
- Location: 5432 University Ave., Indianapolis, Indiana
- Coordinates: 39°46′0″N 86°4′31″W
- Area: 1.5 acres (0.61 ha)
- Built: 1889
- Architectural style: Colonial Revival
- NRHP reference No.: 82001857
- Added to NRHP: July 15, 1982

William H. H. Graham House, also known as the Stephenson Mansion, is a historic home located in the Irvington Historic District in Indianapolis, Indiana. It was built in 1889, and is a 2 1/2-story, four-bay Colonial Revival style frame dwelling. The house features a front portico supported by four, two-story Ionic order columns added in 1923, and a two-story bay window. In the 1920s it was the home of D. C. Stephenson, head of the Indiana Klan.

It was added to the National Register of Historic Places in 1982.

== See also ==
- National Register of Historic Places listings in Marion County, Indiana
