= Lake Hickory =

Lake in North Carolina

- Location within North Carolina Location within the United States
- Location: Catawba / Alexander / Caldwell / Burke
- Coordinates: 35.7944°N 81.3439°W
- Lake type: Reservoir
- Primary inflows: Catawba River
- Primary outflows: Catawba River via Oxford Dam
- Basin countries: United States
- Surface area: <4,223 acres 6.6 sq mi (17 km^{2})
- Average depth: 33 feet (10 m)
- Water volume: 137,821 acres (55,774 ha)
- Residence time: 33 days
- Shore length^{1}: 105 miles (169 km)
- Surface elevation: 935 feet (285 m)
- Settlements: Hickory, Northlakes, Bethlehem, St. Stephens
- ^{1} Shore length is not a well-defined measure.

Lake Hickory is a man-made lake sat in-between Catawba and Alexander counties in North Carolina, with western parts of the lake bordering Caldwell and Burke counties. Lake Hickory was created in 1927 after the construction of the Oxford Dam owned by Duke Energy. The lake is named after the nearby city of Hickory. Lake Hickory provides water to multiple nearby cities including Hickory, Conover, and Longview.

The Oxford Dam, owned by Duke Energy, was built in 1927, and became operational in 1928, producing 36 megawatts of electricity. The Oxford Dam lead to the creation of Lake Hickory. The dam is 122 feet tall and 1200 feet long, with a spillway section of 550 feet. It is parallel to Interstate 40 connecting Catawba County to Alexander County.

Western parts of the lake, that are within Caldwell and Burke Counties, are under the Blue Ridge National Heritage Area.

== Recreation ==
Lake Hickory is fully recreational, which means that swimming, fishing, boating, sailing, water skiing and jet skiing are all allowed. There are 16 public access areas for Lake Hickory.

Lake Hickory is home to the Hickory Riverwalk. The Riverwalk is a 2.3 mile trail; it is one of 5 different trails that make up the 10 mile long Hickory Trail.

Fishing is popular in Lake Hickory. With more than 20 species of fish Lake Hickory including: Largemouth bass, striped bass, and walleye, however some ecological concerns have come up after the introduction of Alabama bass in 2012, with populations increasing significantly since their introduction.
