= Northlakes, North Carolina =

- Census-designated place
- Location within the state of North Carolina
- Coordinates: 35°46′32″N 81°22′01″W
- Country: United States
- State: North Carolina
- County: Caldwell

Area
  - Total: 1.91 sq mi (4.94 km^{2})
  - Land: 1.49 sq mi (3.86 km^{2})
  - Water: 0.42 sq mi (1.08 km^{2})
- Elevation: 1,073 ft (327 m)

Population (2020)
  - Total: 1,543
  - Density: 1,034.2/sq mi (399.31/km^{2})
- Time zone: UTC-5 (Eastern (EST))
  - Summer (DST): UTC-4 (EDT)
- Area code: 828
- FIPS code: 37-47695
- GNIS feature ID: 2403359
- Website: https://northlakeshoa.blogspot.com/

Northlakes is a census-designated place (CDP) in Caldwell County, North Carolina, United States. As of the 2020 census, Northlakes had a population of 1,543. It is part of the Hickory–Lenoir–Morganton Metropolitan Statistical Area.

== Geography ==
Northlakes is located at the southeastern end of Caldwell County. It is bordered to the southeast by Lake Hickory, a reservoir on the Catawba River. The river forms the Caldwell County line, with Burke and Catawba counties on the opposite side.

The city of Hickory is on the opposite side of Lake Hickory and also borders Northlakes to the west. The town of Granite Falls borders Northlakes to the northwest. Along the northern edge of the community is Gunpowder Creek, inundated to form an arm of Lake Hickory.

According to the United States Census Bureau, the CDP has a total area of 1.9 square miles (4.9 km^{2}), of which 1.5 square miles (3.9 km^{2}) is land and 0.4 square miles (1.0 km^{2}), or 21.24%, is water.

== Demographics ==
Historical population
Census	Pop.	Note	%±
1990	1,219		—
2000	1,390		14.0%
2010	1,534		10.4%
2020	1,543		0.6%
U.S. Decennial Census

=== 2020 census ===
Northlakes racial composition
Race	Number	Percentage
White (non-Hispanic)	1,388	89.95%
Black or African American (non-Hispanic)	27	1.75%
Native American	1	0.06%
Asian	42	2.72%
Other/Mixed	47	3.05%
Hispanic or Latino	38	2.46%

As of the 2020 United States census, there were 1,543 people, 617 households, and 400 families residing in the CDP.

=== 2000 census ===
At the time of the 2000 Census, there were 1,390 people, 511 households, and 429 families residing in the CDP. The population density was 932.2 inhabitants per square mile (359.9/km^{2}). There were 535 housing units at an average density of 358.8 per square mile (138.5/km^{2}). The racial makeup of the CDP was 98.27% White, 0.50% African American, 0.22% Native American, 0.22% Asian, 0.22% from other races, and 0.58% from two or more races. Hispanic or Latino of any race were 0.50% of the population.

There were 511 households, out of which 38.9% had children under the age of 18 living with them, 76.1% were married couples living together, 6.3% had a female householder with no husband present, and 15.9% were non-families. 13.3% of all households were made up of individuals, and 4.7% had someone living alone who was 65 years of age or older. The average household size was 2.72 and the average family size was 2.99.

In the CDP, the population was spread out, with 27.3% under the age of 18, 3.6% from 18 to 24, 30.1% from 25 to 44, 29.8% from 45 to 64, and 9.2% who were 65 years of age or older. The median age was 39 years. For every 100 females, there were 98.0 males. For every 100 females age 18 and over, there were 97.8 males.

The median income for a household in the CDP was $67,692, and the median income for a family was $67,237. Males had a median income of $56,429 versus $33,000 for females. The per capita income for the CDP was $27,285. About 1.4% of families and 2.4% of the population were below the poverty line, including 4.7% of those under age 18 and none of those age 65 or over.
