= Hickory–Lenoir–Morganton metropolitan area =

Hickory Metro (The Unifour)
- Metropolitan Statistical Area
- Hickory–Lenoir–Morganton, NC; Metropolitan Statistical Area
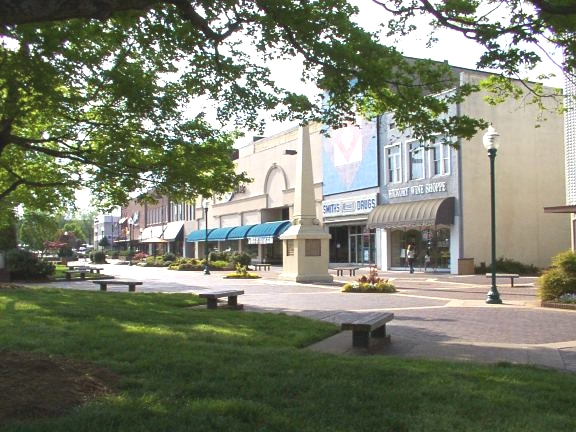
- Union Square in Downtown Hickory
Interactive Map of the Hickory–Lenoir–Morganton, NC MSA, also known as The Unifour.
City of Hickory
City of Lenoir
City of Morganton
Hickory–Lenoir–Morganton, NC MSA
Other Counties in the Charlotte–Concord, NC–SC CSA
- Country: United States
- State: North Carolina
- Principal cities: Hickory; Lenoir; Morganton

Area
  - Metropolitan Statistical Area: 1,666 sq mi (4,310 km^{2})
  - Land: 1,637.72 sq mi (4,241.7 km^{2})
  - Water: 34.28 sq mi (88.8 km^{2})
- Elevation: 305–2,559 ft (93–780 m)

Population (2025)
  - Urban: 201,511 (189th)
  - MSA: 376,890 (151st)

GDP
  - Metro: $18.281 billion (2022)
- Time zone: UTC-5 (EST)
  - Summer (DST): UTC-4 (EDT)
- Area codes: 828, 704

The Hickory–Lenoir–Morganton, NC Metropolitan Statistical Area, as defined by the U.S. Office of Management and Budget, is an area consisting of four counties in North Carolina; Catawba, Burke, Caldwell, and Alexander. It is located in the Catawba Valley region of Western North Carolina. Locally, the metropolitan area is sometimes referred to as the Unifour.

The OMB includes the Unifour in the larger Charlotte–Concord, NC-SC Combined Statistical Area.

The 2020 census gives the MSA's population as 365,276, with a July 1, 2025, estimate placing the population at 376,890.

== Area ==
=== Counties ===
County	Seat	2025 estimate	2020 Census	Change	Area	Density
Catawba	Newton	170,172	160,610	+5.95%	416.02 sq mi (1,077.5 km^{2})	409/sq mi (158/km^{2})
Burke	Morganton	88,655	87,570	+1.24%	514.24 sq mi (1,331.9 km^{2})	172/sq mi (67/km^{2})
Caldwell	Lenoir	81,105	80,652	+0.56%	474.61 sq mi (1,229.2 km^{2})	171/sq mi (66/km^{2})
Alexander	Taylorsville	36,958	36,444	+1.41%	263.64 sq mi (682.8 km^{2})	140/sq mi (54/km^{2})
Total		376,890	365,276	+3.18%	1,668.51 sq mi (4,321.4 km^{2})	226/sq mi (87/km^{2})

=== Anchor city ===
- Hickory Catawba/Burke/Caldwell 43,490

=== Principal cities ===
- Lenoir Caldwell 18,352
- Morganton Burke 17,474

=== Suburban towns and cities over 5,000 in population ===
(Including county and 2020 U.S. census population)

- Conover Catawba 8,421
- Long View Catawba & Burke 5,088
- Newton Catawba 13,148
- Sawmills Caldwell 5,020

=== Suburban towns and cities under 5,000 in population ===
(Including county and 2020 U.S. census population)

- Blowing Rock Caldwell & Watauga 1,376
- Brookford Catawba 442
- Catawba Catawba 702
- Cedar Rock Caldwell 301
- Claremont Catawba 1,692
- Connelly Springs Burke 1,529
- Drexel Burke 1,760
- Gamewell Caldwell 3,702
- Glen Alpine Burke 1,529
- Granite Falls Caldwell 4,965
- Hildebran Burke 1,679
- Hudson Caldwell 3,780
- Maiden Catawba & Lincoln 3,736
- Rhodhiss Burke & Caldwell 997
- Rutherford College Burke 1,226
- Taylorsville Alexander 2,320
- Valdese Burke 4,689

== Unincorporated communities ==
(Including county and 2020 U.S. census population)

- Bethlehem Alexander 4,491
- Collettsville Caldwell
- Hiddenite Alexander 507
- Icard Burke 2,452
- Lake Norman of Catawba Catawba 11,395
- Mountain View Catawba 3,590
- Northlakes Caldwell 1,543
- Petersburg Burke
- Salem Burke 2,356
- Stony Point Alexander 1,146
- St. Stephens Catawba 8,852
- Sherrills Ford Catawba
- Terrell Catawba

== Transportation ==
=== Mass transit ===
Greenway Public Transportation offers bus service to the cities of Conover, Hickory, Morganton, and Newton.

=== Roads ===
The Hickory region is served by Interstate 40 which passes through the center of Catawba and Burke counties.

Other important US highways in the region include: US 70 (east to Morehead City, west to Asheville), and US 321 (through Catawba and Caldwell Counties).

Primary state routes include NC 10, NC 16, NC 18, NC 90, NC 127, and NC 150.

=== Air ===
The region's primary general aviation airport is Hickory Regional Airport. The closest commercial airports are Charlotte-Douglas International Airport and Asheville Regional Airport.

=== Rail ===
With approximately twenty freight trains a day, Catawba County is a freight railroad transportation center. This is largely due to the areas strong manufacturing based economy, and its placement along the Norfolk Southern Railway line. The Caldwell County Railroad also serves the county and interchanges with Norfolk Southern in Hickory. Conover has been designated a stop on the future Western NC Rail service.

== Higher education ==
- Appalachian Center at Hickory
- Caldwell Community College and Technical Institute
- Catawba Valley Community College
- Lenoir–Rhyne University
- NC Center for Engineering Technologies
- Western Piedmont Community College

== Demographics ==
As of the census of 2000, there were 341,851 people, 133,966 households, and 95,583 families residing within the MSA. The racial makeup of the MSA was 87.47% White, 6.91% African American, 0.25% Native American, 2.31% Asian, 0.08% Pacific Islander, 1.95% from other races, and 1.02% from two or more races. Hispanic or Latino of any race were 4.05% of the population.

The median income for a household in the MSA was $37,647, and the median income for a family was $44,236. Males had a median income of $29,273 versus $22,266 for females. The per capita income for the MSA was $18,404.

== See also ==
- North Carolina census statistical areas
- List of cities, towns, and villages in North Carolina
- List of unincorporated communities in North Carolina
