= North Carolina Highway 114 =

State highway in Burke County, North Carolina, US

North Carolina Highway 114
- NC 114 highlighted in red

Route information
- Maintained by NCDOT
- Length: 2.6 mi (4.2 km)
- Existed: c. 1930–present

Major junctions
- South end: I-40 near Drexel
- US 70 in Drexel
- North end: Oakland Avenue in Drexel

Location
- Country: United States
- State: North Carolina
- Counties: Burke

Highway system
- North Carolina Highway System; Interstate; US; State; Scenic
← NC 113	→ NC 115

North Carolina Highway 114 (NC 114) is a 2.6-mile-long (4.2 km) primary state highway in the U.S. state of North Carolina. It travels north–south from Interstate 40 (I-40) south of Drexel to Oakland Avenue, north of the central business district of Drexel. NC 114 provides an important link between Drexel and U.S. Route 70 (US 70) and I-40. It is primarily a two-lane undivided roadway running through rural Burke County and the town of Drexel.

Established around 1930, NC 114 originally travelled from US 70 and NC 10 to Oakland Avenue in Drexel. US 64 connected with NC 114 by 1933, as it was extended east from Chattanooga, Tennessee in concurrency with US 70. NC 10 was removed from US 70 by 1935 and US 64 was rerouted in 1988, ending NC 114's connection with those highways. The roadway was extended south to I-40 in 1976, and has remained unchanged.

== Route description ==
NC 114's southern terminus is at a partial cloverleaf interchange with I-40, at that freeway's exit 107. The road continues westward past I-40 as Drexel Road toward NC 18. From I-40, NC 114 travels northeast along Drexel Road, a two-lane undivided roadway, toward Drexel. The surrounding landscape is primarily rural with sporadic residential areas along the highway. It parallels McGalliard Creek until intersecting Cook Road, where the highway makes a turn predominately to the north. After intersecting Trinity Church Road, NC 114 turns to the northeast, intersects High Peak Road, and then turns back to the north. The highway reaches US 70 in an area with several retail stores, where it picks up the name South Main Street. The roadway continues northwest through a residential area south of Drexel. Between Castle Street and Cemetery Road, NC 114 travels along the town limits of Drexel, before turning to the north and entering the town. North of Church Street, the highway travels through the central business district of Drexel. After intersecting Mimosa Avenue, NC 114 crosses a railroad owned and operated by Norfolk Southern Railway at an at-grade crossing. The highway reaches its northern terminus at Oakland Avenue, 154 feet (47 m) north of the at-grade crossing.

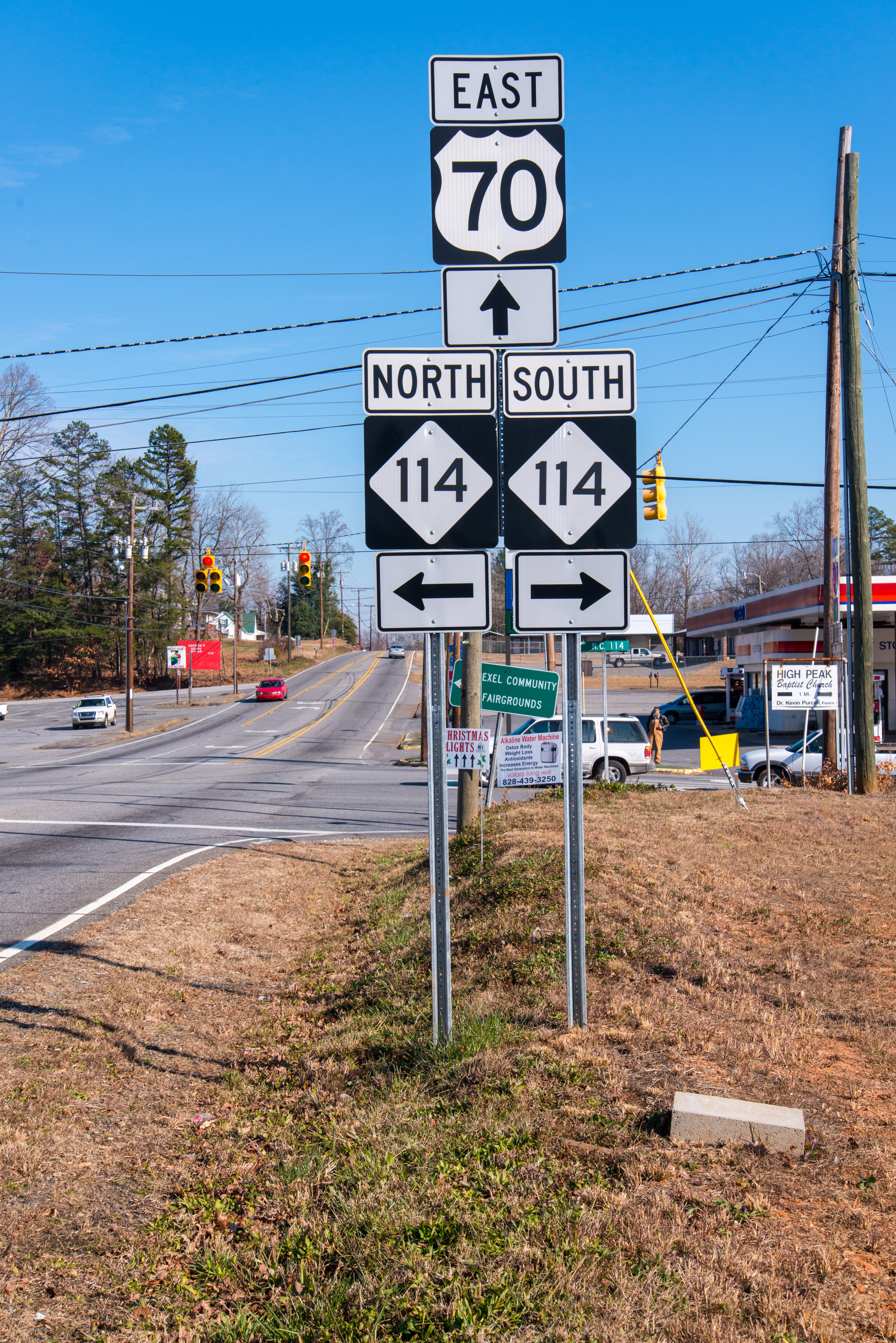
NC 114 crossing US 70 in Drexel

The North Carolina Department of Transportation (NCDOT) measures average daily traffic volumes along many of the roadways it maintains. In 2016, average daily traffic volumes along NC 114 varied from 2,700 vehicles per day south of the Norfolk Southern railroad crossing to 7,200 vehicles per day north of the interchange with I-40. No section of NC 114 is included with the National Highway System, a network of highways in the United States which serve strategic transportation facilities. However, the highway does connect to the National Highway System at I-40.

== History ==
NC 114 was established between 1929 and 1930 by the North Carolina State Highway Commission. It first appeared on official North Carolina state highway maps in 1930. At the time of establishment, its southern terminus was located at an intersection with US 70 and NC 10 south of Drexel. It travelled north along its modern-day routing, ending at Oakland Avenue in Drexel. NC 114 was a hard surface paved road beginning at the time of establishment. US 64 was extended east from Chattanooga, Tennessee along US 70 by 1933. By 1935, NC 10 was truncated to NC 73 (modern day NC 16) in Newton, ending the concurrency with US 64 and US 70 and its connection with NC 114. NC 114 was extended south along Drexel Road to its current southern terminus at I-40 in 1976. In 1988, US 64 was re-routed between Morganton and Statesville to follow NC 18 and NC 90. Since being extended south to I-40, the road's designation has not been changed.

== Major intersections ==
The entire route is in Burke County.

Location	mi	km	Destinations	Notes
	0.0	0.0	I-40 – Asheville, Hickory	Southern terminus; I-40 exit 107; partial cloverleaf interchange
Drexel	1.8	2.9	US 70 – Morganton, Valdese	
Drexel	2.6	4.2	Oakland Avenue	Northern terminus
1.000 mi = 1.609 km; 1.000 km = 0.621 mi
