= Corinth, North Carolina =

Corinth, North Carolina may refer to:

- Corinth, Chatham County, North Carolina
- Corinth, Nash County, North Carolina
- Corinth, Rutherford County, North Carolina
- Banoak, North Carolina, also known as Corinth
- Hocutts Crossroads, North Carolina, also known as Corinth-Holder
