= Rhodhiss, North Carolina =

- Town
- Seal

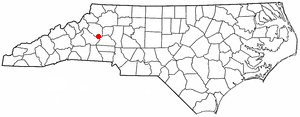
- Location of Rhodhiss, North Carolina
- Coordinates: 35°46′06″N 81°25′52″W
- Country: United States
- State: North Carolina
- Counties: Burke, Caldwell

Area
  - Total: 1.26 sq mi (3.26 km^{2})
  - Land: 1.19 sq mi (3.08 km^{2})
  - Water: 0.073 sq mi (0.19 km^{2})
- Elevation: 1,060 ft (320 m)

Population (2020)
  - Total: 997
  - Density: 839/sq mi (324.1/km^{2})
- Time zone: UTC-5 (Eastern (EST))
  - Summer (DST): UTC-4 (EDT)
- ZIP code: 28667
- Area code: 828
- FIPS code: 37-56240
- GNIS feature ID: 2407204
- Website: townofrhodhissnc.com

Rhodhiss is a town in Caldwell and Burke counties in the U.S. state of North Carolina. As of the 2020 census, Rhodhiss had a population of 997. It is part of the Hickory–Lenoir–Morganton Metropolitan Statistical Area.

== History ==
The name "Rhodhiss" comes from John M. Rhodes and George B. Hiss. They joined to build a cotton mill on the upper Catawba River in Caldwell County. With a $500,000 investment, they helped construct the village of Rhodhiss, which included a horseshoe-shaped dam, electric generator, mill, general store, and worker houses. Rhodhiss Manufacturing Company opened in 1902, with Rhodhiss incorporating as a town in 1903. Within the next decade, the Town of Rhodhiss would expand into Burke County, with a new steel bridge spanning the Catawba River to connect the town together.

The material of the U.S. flag that astronauts Neil Armstrong and Buzz Aldrin erected on the first visit to the Moon in 1969, was woven at Burlington Mills Plant 2 in Rhodhiss. Glen Price, a lifelong Rhodhiss resident, was manager at the time.

== Geography ==
Rhodhiss is located in eastern Burke County and southern Caldwell County. It is bordered to the north by the town of Granite Falls. The Catawba River runs through the center of the town, which is located just east (downstream) of Rhodhiss Dam. One bridge crosses the river in the town, leading north on Caldwell Street to Granite Falls, and leading south on Burke Street towards Icard and Connelly Springs. The small town has only one traffic light, a cautionary flashing yellow light, not a stop light. There is only one police officer, as the town has the lowest crime rate in Caldwell County. In the 1980s, there was a beach, that was located on Strawberry Hill (the first road on the right, just after crossing the bridge into Burke county). There was also a Boys Scout club house at the top of that same road; however, it closed in either the late 1970s or early 1980s. According to the United States Census Bureau, the town has a total area of 1.3 square miles (3.3 km^{2}), of which 1.2 square miles (3.1 km^{2}) is land and 0.08 square miles (0.2 km^{2}), or 5.85%, is water.

== Demographics ==
Historical population
Census	Pop.	Note	%±
1910	370		—
1920	835		125.7%
1930	954		14.3%
1940	930		−2.5%
1950	923		−0.8%
1960	837		−9.3%
1970	784		−6.3%
1980	727		−7.3%
1990	638		−12.2%
2000	366		−42.6%
2010	1,070		192.3%
2020	997		−6.8%
U.S. Decennial Census

=== 2020 census ===
Rhodhiss racial composition
Race	Number	Percentage
White (non-Hispanic)	824	82.65%
Black or African American (non-Hispanic)	23	2.31%
Native American	4	0.4%
Asian	29	2.91%
Other/Mixed	58	5.82%
Hispanic or Latino	59	5.92%

As of the 2020 United States census, there were 997 people, 366 households, and 218 families residing in the town.

=== 2000 census ===
As of the census of 2000, there were 366 people, 170 households, and 112 families residing in the town. The population density was 374.5 inhabitants per square mile (144.6/km^{2}). There were 188 housing units at an average density of 192.3 per square mile (74.2/km^{2}). The racial makeup of the town was 99.18% White, 0.55% African American, 0.27% from other races. Hispanic or Latino of any race were 0.27% of the population.

There were 170 households, out of which 21.2% had children under the age of 18 living with them, 49.4% were married couples living together, 10.6% had a female householder with no husband present, and 34.1% were non-families. 30.6% of all households were made up of individuals, and 18.8% had someone living alone who was 65 years of age or older. The average household size was 2.15 and the average family size was 2.62.

In the town, the population was spread out, with 17.5% under the age of 18, 6.6% from 18 to 24, 29.2% from 25 to 44, 28.1% from 45 to 64, and 18.6% who were 65 years of age or older. The median age was 43 years. For every 100 females, there were 88.7 males.

The median income for a household in the town was $32,875, and the median income for a family was $41,875. Males had a median income of $27,614 versus $22,917 for females. The per capita income for the town was $18,165. About 5.6% of families and 12.5% of the population were below the poverty line, including 12.5% of those under age 18 and 28.4% of those age 65 or over.

== Notable person ==
- Jack Curtis – former MLB player for the Chicago Cubs, Milwaukee Braves, and Cleveland Indians
