= Abraham Anthony Farm =

Historic district in North Carolina, United States

- U.S. National Register of Historic Places
- U.S. Historic district
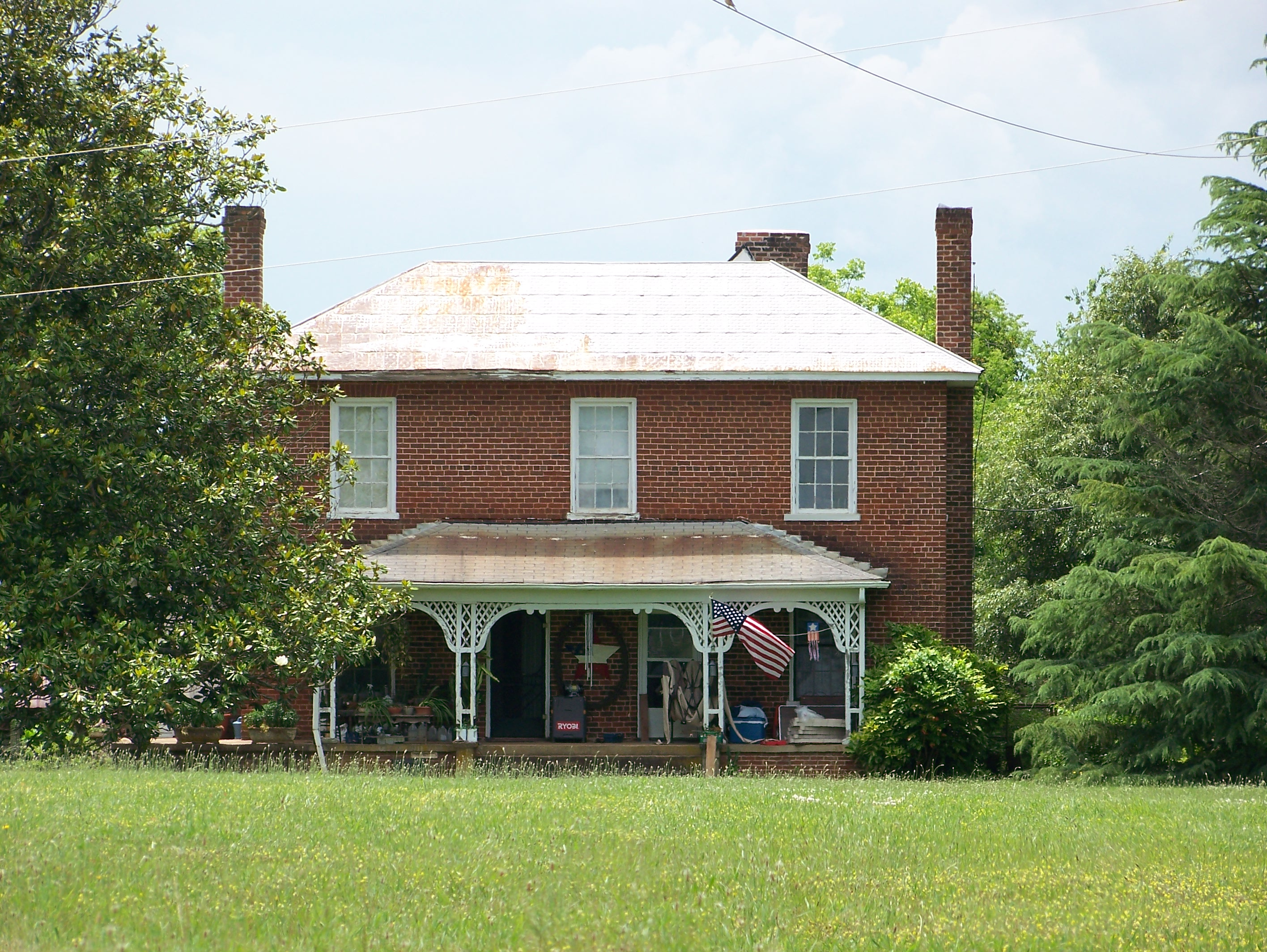

- Location within North Carolina Location within the United States
- Location: West side of SR 1008, 0.5 miles (0.80 km) south of the junction with SR 2021, near Blackburn, North Carolina
- Coordinates: 35°34′28″N 81°18′38″W
- Area: 126.8 acres (51.3 ha)
- Built: 1877
- Built by: W.W. Wels, Daniel Jarrett
- Architectural style: Greek Revival
- MPS: Catawba County MPS
- NRHP reference No.: 90000738
- Added to NRHP: May 10, 1990

Abraham Anthony Farm is a historic farm and national historic district located near Blackburn, Catawba County, North Carolina. The district encompasses 13 contributing buildings, 1 contributing site, and 2 contributing structures. The main house was built in 1877, and is a two-story, brick, late Greek Revival style farmhouse. Also on the property is a collection of brick, log, frame and concrete outbuildings and a log cabin.

It was added to the National Register of Historic Places in 1990.
