= Hildebran, North Carolina =

- Town
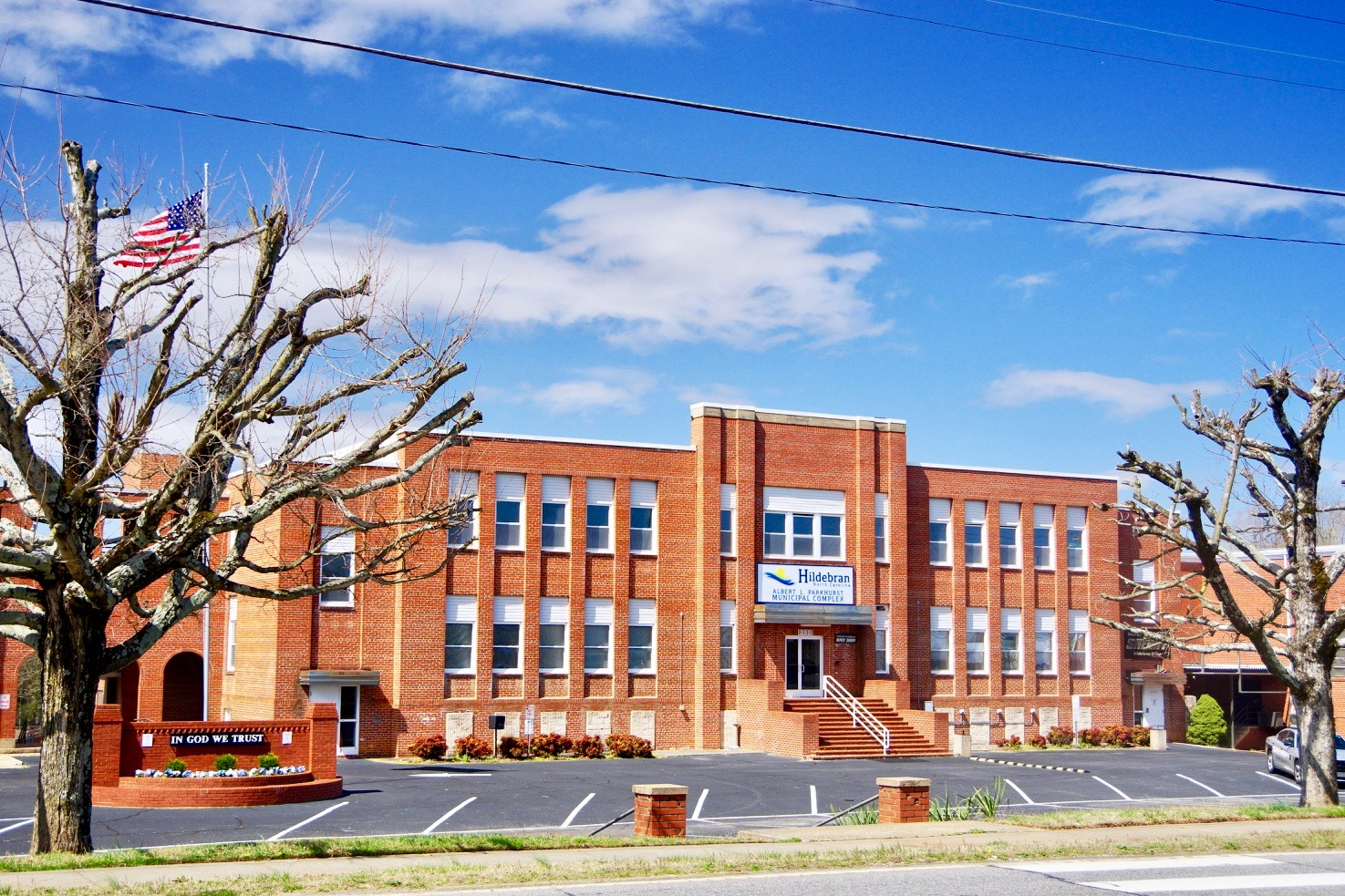
- Parkhurst Municipal Complex

- Flag Seal Logo

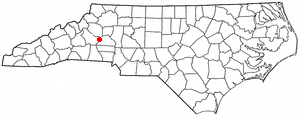
- Location of Hildebran, North Carolina
- Coordinates: 35°43′06″N 81°25′16″W
- Country: United States
- State: North Carolina
- County: Burke
- Incorporated: 1899
- Named for: Soloman and Jacob Hildebrand

Area
  - Total: 2.83 sq mi (7.33 km^{2})
  - Land: 2.83 sq mi (7.33 km^{2})
  - Water: 0 sq mi (0.00 km^{2})
- Elevation: 1,106 ft (337 m)

Population (2020)
  - Total: 1,679
  - Density: 593.7/sq mi (229.21/km^{2})
- Time zone: UTC-5 (Eastern (EST))
  - Summer (DST): UTC-4 (EDT)
- ZIP code: 28637
- Area code: 828
- FIPS code: 37-31500
- GNIS feature ID: 2405835
- Website: hildebrannc.com

Hildebran is a town in Burke County, North Carolina, United States. As of the 2020 census, Hildebran had a population of 1,679. It is part of the Hickory-Lenoir-Morganton Metropolitan Statistical Area.

== History ==
There are two conflicting stories from where the name Hildebran came from. The one more accepted is that it was named after 19th-century land owner Solomon Hildebrand and his son Jacob; the other is that it was named after the 11th-century Pope Gregory VII (Hildebrand of Sovana). When Hildebran received its charter in 1899, the "d" was dropped from the name.

== Geography ==
Hildebran is located in eastern Burke County. Its southeastern border is also the border with Catawba County. The town of Long View borders Hildebran to the east, and the census-designated place of Icard borders Hildebran to the west. Interstate 40 follows the town's southern border, with access from exits 118 and 119. U.S. Route 70 passes through the center of the town, leading east 5 miles (8 km) to Hickory and west 16 miles (26 km) to Morganton.

According to the United States Census Bureau, the town has a total area of 2.9 square miles (7.4 km^{2}), all land.

== Demographics ==
Historical population
Census	Pop.	Note	%±
1900	109		—
1910	140		28.4%
1920	172		22.9%
1930	246		43.0%
1940	357		45.1%
1950	529		48.2%
1960	518		−2.1%
1970	481		−7.1%
1980	628		30.6%
1990	790		25.8%
2000	1,472		86.3%
2010	2,023		37.4%
2020	1,679		−17.0%
U.S. Decennial Census

=== 2020 census ===
Hildebran racial composition
Race	Number	Percentage
White (non-Hispanic)	1,450	86.36%
Black or African American (non-Hispanic)	21	1.25%
Native American	3	0.18%
Asian	79	4.71%
Pacific Islander	1	0.06%
Other/Mixed	63	3.75%
Hispanic or Latino	62	3.69%

As of the 2020 United States census, there were 1,679 people, 822 households, and 558 families residing in the town.

=== 2000 census ===
As of the census of 2000, there were 1,472 people, 597 households, and 416 families residing in the town. The population density was 657.4 inhabitants per square mile (253.8/km^{2}). There were 626 housing units at an average density of 279.6 per square mile (108.0/km^{2}). The racial makeup of the town was 92.73% White, 1.15% African American, 0.54% Native American, 4.42% Asian, 0.54% from other races, and 0.61% from two or more races. Hispanic or Latino of any race were 0.68% of the population.

There were 597 households, out of which 26.8% had children under the age of 18 living with them, 53.8% were married couples living together, 11.7% had a female householder with no husband present, and 30.3% were non-families. 24.8% of all households were made up of individuals, and 10.4% had someone living alone who was 65 years of age or older. The average household size was 2.41 and the average family size was 2.88.

In the town, the population was spread out, with 22.6% under the age of 18, 7.3% from 18 to 24, 29.8% from 25 to 44, 22.8% from 45 to 64, and 17.6% who were 65 years of age or older. The median age was 38 years. For every 100 females, there were 85.6 males. For every 100 females age 18 and over, there were 83.0 males.

The median income for a household in the town was $34,028, and the median income for a family was $43,542. Males had a median income of $28,500 versus $22,765 for females. The per capita income for the town was $15,835. About 6.0% of families and 8.6% of the population were below the poverty line, including 6.2% of those under age 18 and 20.0% of those age 65 or over.
