= Gamewell, North Carolina =

- Town
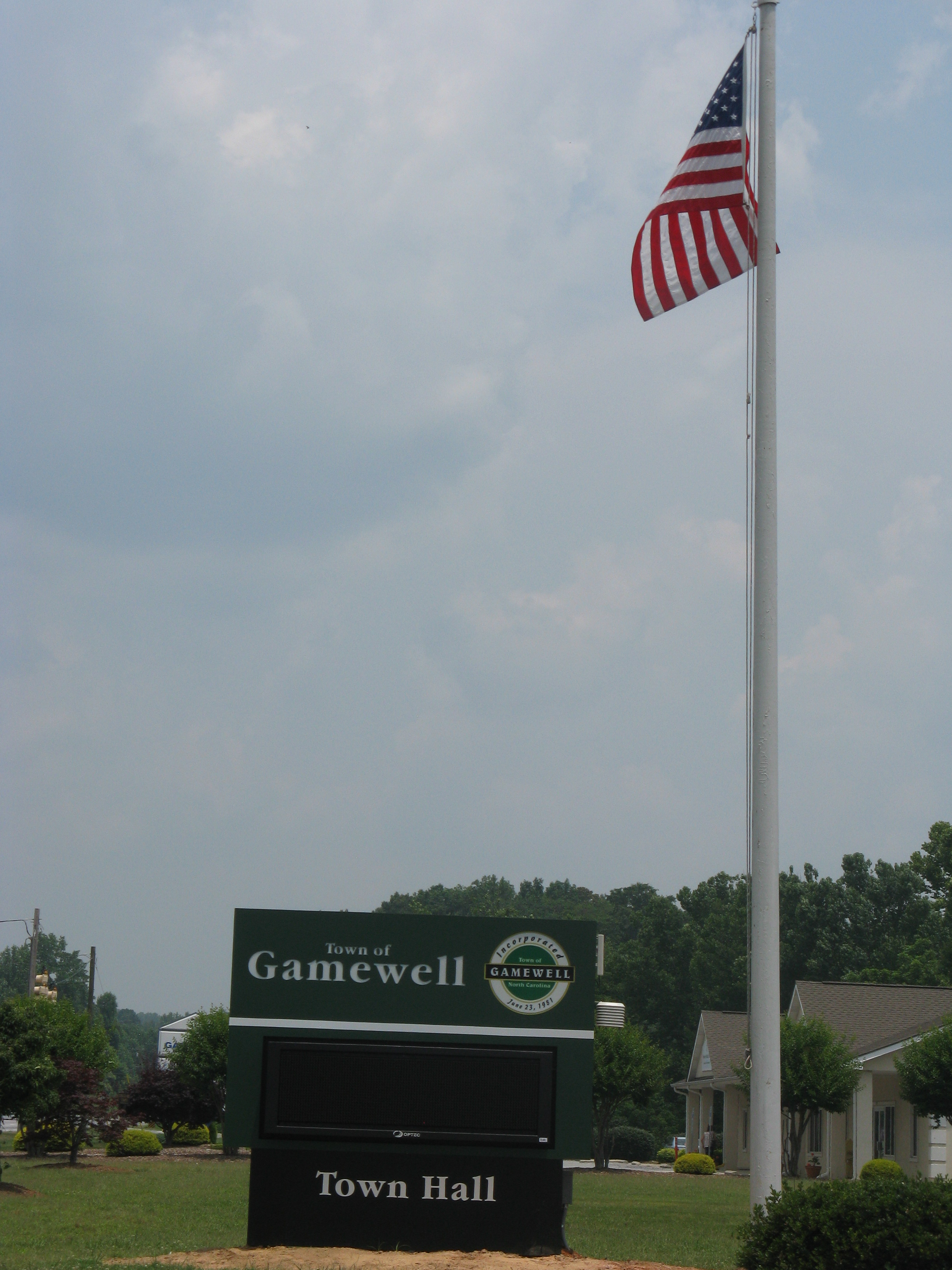
- Gamewell Town Hall

- Logo

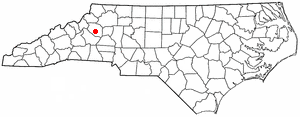
- Location in North Carolina
- Coordinates: 35°51′50″N 81°35′52″W
- Country: United States
- State: North Carolina
- County: Caldwell

Area
  - Total: 8.11 sq mi (21.00 km^{2})
  - Land: 8.11 sq mi (21.00 km^{2})
  - Water: 0 sq mi (0.00 km^{2})
- Elevation: 1,053 ft (321 m)

Population (2020)
  - Total: 3,702
  - Density: 457/sq mi (176.3/km^{2})
- Time zone: UTC-5 (Eastern (EST))
  - Summer (DST): UTC-4 (EDT)
- ZIP code: 28645
- Area code: 828
- FIPS code: 37-25380
- GNIS feature ID: 2406538
- Website: www.townofgamewell.com

Gamewell is a town in Caldwell County, North Carolina, United States. As of the 2020 census, Gamewell had a population of 3,702. It is part of the Hickory–Lenoir–Morganton Metropolitan Statistical Area.

== History ==
Gamewell was incorporated as a town in 1981.

== Geography ==
Gamewell is located in southwestern Caldwell County. It is bordered on the northeast by the city of Lenoir, the county seat. U.S. Route 64 passes through the town, leading northeast into Lenoir and southwest 10 miles (16 km) to Morganton.

According to the United States Census Bureau, the town has a total area of 8.1 square miles (21.0 km^{2}), all land. Gamewell is located in the valley of Lower Creek, a southwestward-flowing tributary of the Catawba River.

== Demographics ==
Historical population
| Census | Pop. | Note | %± |
|---|---|---|---|
| 1990 | 3,357 | | — |
| 2000 | 3,644 | | 8.5% |
| 2010 | 4,051 | | 11.2% |
| 2020 | 3,702 | | −8.6% |
U.S. Decennial Census

=== 2020 census ===
As of the 2020 census, Gamewell had a population of 3,702. The median age was 45.4 years. 20.4% of residents were under the age of 18 and 21.8% of residents were 65 years of age or older. For every 100 females there were 94.7 males, and for every 100 females age 18 and over there were 94.7 males age 18 and over.

6.3% of residents lived in urban areas, while 93.7% lived in rural areas.

There were 1,533 households in Gamewell, of which 29.6% had children under the age of 18 living in them. Of all households, 47.3% were married-couple households, 19.1% were households with a male householder and no spouse or partner present, and 25.7% were households with a female householder and no spouse or partner present. About 26.1% of all households were made up of individuals and 13.1% had someone living alone who was 65 years of age or older.

There were 1,683 housing units, of which 8.9% were vacant. The homeowner vacancy rate was 1.9% and the rental vacancy rate was 8.4%.

Gamewell racial composition
| Race | Number | Percentage |
|---|---|---|
| White (non-Hispanic) | 3,142 | 84.87% |
| Black or African American (non-Hispanic) | 199 | 5.38% |
| Native American | 12 | 0.32% |
| Asian | 16 | 0.43% |
| Pacific Islander | 1 | 0.03% |
| Other/Mixed | 170 | 4.59% |
| Hispanic or Latino | 162 | 4.38% |

=== 2000 census ===
As of the census of 2000, there were 3,644 people, 1,501 households, and 1,116 families residing in the town. The population density was 458.8 inhabitants per square mile (177.1/km^{2}). There were 1,615 housing units at an average density of 203.3 per square mile (78.5/km^{2}). The racial makeup of the town was 94.10% White, 3.92% African American, 0.25% Native American, 0.11% Asian, 0.99% from other races, and 0.63% from two or more races. Hispanic or Latino of any race were 1.37% of the population.

There were 1,501 households, out of which 27.9% had children under the age of 18 living with them, 57.7% were married couples living together, 12.7% had a female householder with no husband present, and 25.6% were non-families. 22.3% of all households were made up of individuals, and 8.2% had someone living alone who was 65 years of age or older. The average household size was 2.43 and the average family size was 2.80.

In the town, the population was spread out, with 21.4% under the age of 18, 8.6% from 18 to 24, 29.3% from 25 to 44, 27.5% from 45 to 64, and 13.1% who were 65 years of age or older. The median age was 39 years. For every 100 females, there were 101.2 males. For every 100 females age 18 and over, there were 97.0 males.

The median income for a household in the town was $39,225, and the median income for a family was $43,167. Males had a median income of $26,654 versus $22,039 for females. The per capita income for the town was $16,536. About 7.0% of families and 9.9% of the population were below the poverty line, including 16.9% of those under age 18 and 7.6% of those age 65 or over.

== Notable person ==
- Destin Hall, American attorney and politician
