= Murray's Mill Historic District =

Historic district in North Carolina, United States

- U.S. National Register of Historic Places
- U.S. Historic district
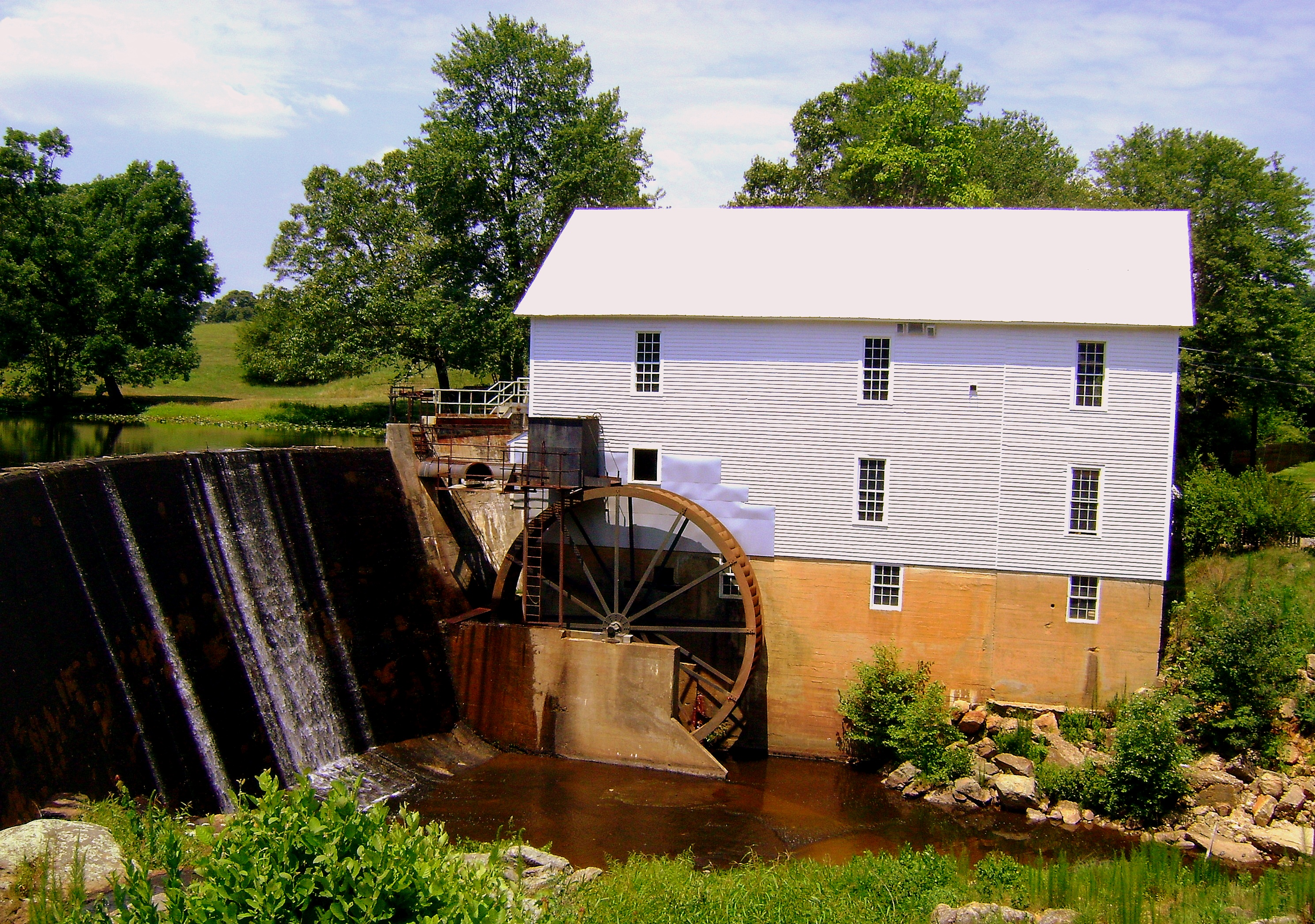
- Murray's Mill, July 2010

- Location within North Carolina Location within the United States
- Location: Southeast of Catawba, near Catawba, North Carolina
- Coordinates: 35°40′27″N 81°05′44″W
- Area: 152.9 acres (61.9 ha)
- Built: 1880
- NRHP reference No.: 79001689
- Added to NRHP: December 31, 1979

Murray's Mill Historic District is a national historic district located near Catawba, Catawba County, North Carolina. The district encompasses 20+ contributing buildings near the rural Town of Catawba. It contains the mill buildings, four residences and complementing structures associated with the milling operations and the Murray family. They were built between the 1880s and mid-20th century. Notable buildings include the large two-story frame mill (1912-1913), store building (1890s, 1930s), wheathouse (1880s), John L. Murray House (1913), a large gable roof frame barn (1930s), Lloyd Murray House (1935), and William Murray House (1880s).

It was added to the National Register of Historic Places in 1979.

The Catawba County Historical Association owns Murray's Mill and the other buildings and operates them as a museum that is open weekends mid-march through November and Thursday and Friday June through September. Visitors can see the mill's grindstones and milling equipment. The 1913 John Murray House has been restored and furnished with period artifacts, and the 1880s wheathouse is used as an exhibit gallery. The general store is the museum's gift shop.
