= St. Stephens, North Carolina =

- Census-designated place
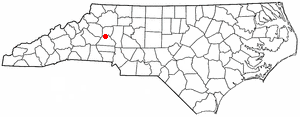
- Location of St. Stephens in North Carolina
- Coordinates: 35°45′51″N 81°16′28″W
- Country: United States
- State: North Carolina
- County: Catawba

Area
  - Total: 9.65 sq mi (24.99 km^{2})
  - Land: 9.30 sq mi (24.08 km^{2})
  - Water: 0.35 sq mi (0.91 km^{2})
- Elevation: 1,099 ft (335 m)

Population (2020)
  - Total: 8,852
  - Density: 952.1/sq mi (367.62/km^{2})
- Time zone: UTC-5 (Eastern (EST))
  - Summer (DST): UTC-4 (EDT)
- FIPS code: 37-58730
- GNIS feature ID: 2402814

St. Stephens is a census-designated place (CDP) in Catawba County, North Carolina, United States. As of the 2020 census, St. Stephens had a population of 8,852. It is part of the Hickory–Lenoir–Morganton Metropolitan Statistical Area .

== Geography ==
St. Stephens is located in northern Catawba County. It is bordered on the west by the city of Hickory, on the south by the city of Conover, and on the north by Alexander County, separated from St. Stephens by Lake Hickory on the Catawba River.

According to the United States Census Bureau, the CDP has a total area of 9.9 square miles (25.7 km^{2}), of which 9.5 square miles (24.6 km^{2}) is land and 0.42 square miles (1.1 km^{2}), or 4.09%, is water. The area of the CDP has declined from 10.2 square miles (26.4 km^{2}) at the 2000 census due to annexation by the neighboring cities.

== Demographics ==
Historical population
Census	Pop.	Note	%±
2020	8,852		—
U.S. Decennial Census

=== 2020 census ===
As of the 2020 census, St. Stephens had a population of 8,852. The median age was 41.0 years. 22.9% of residents were under the age of 18 and 18.1% of residents were 65 years of age or older. For every 100 females there were 97.4 males, and for every 100 females age 18 and over there were 96.3 males age 18 and over.

96.3% of residents lived in urban areas, while 3.7% lived in rural areas.

There were 3,466 households in St. Stephens, of which 29.9% had children under the age of 18 living in them. Of all households, 50.3% were married-couple households, 18.0% were households with a male householder and no spouse or partner present, and 23.7% were households with a female householder and no spouse or partner present. About 25.0% of all households were made up of individuals and 12.4% had someone living alone who was 65 years of age or older.

There were 3,731 housing units, of which 7.1% were vacant. The homeowner vacancy rate was 1.7% and the rental vacancy rate was 4.2%.

St. Stephens racial composition
Race	Number	Percentage
White (non-Hispanic)	5,945	67.16%
Black or African American (non-Hispanic)	351	3.97%
Native American	26	0.29%
Asian	501	5.66%
Pacific Islander	1	0.01%
Other/Mixed	405	4.58%
Hispanic or Latino	1,623	18.33%

=== 2000 census ===
As of the census of 2000, there were 9,439 people, 3,506 households, and 2,675 families residing in the CDP. The population density was 962.2 inhabitants per square mile (371.5/km^{2}). There were 3,683 housing units at an average density of 375.4 per square mile (144.9/km^{2}). The racial makeup of the CDP was 88.77% White, 2.67% African American, 0.42% Native American, 2.79% Asian, 0.03% Pacific Islander, 4.06% from other races, and 1.26% from two or more races. Hispanic or Latino of any race were 9.76% of the population.

There were 3,509 households, out of which 34.1% had children under the age of 18 living with them, 60.8% were married couples living together, 10.0% had a female householder with no husband present, and 23.7% were non-families. 19.6% of all households were made up of individuals, and 7.2% had someone living alone who was 65 years of age or older. The average household size was 2.66 and the average family size was 3.01.

In the CDP, the population was spread out, with 24.6% under the age of 18, 9.3% from 18 to 24, 30.6% from 25 to 44, 24.0% from 45 to 64, and 11.5% who were 65 years of age or older. The median age was 36 years. For every 100 females, there were 104.5 males. For every 100 females age 18 and over, there were 101.2 males.

The median income for a household in the CDP was $41,790, and the median income for a family was $45,763. Males had a median income of $29,452 versus $24,248 for females. The per capita income for the CDP was $18,038. About 5.7% of families and 7.1% of the population were below the poverty line, including 8.2% of those under age 18 and 7.4% of those age 65 or over.

== Education ==
It is in the Catawba County Schools school district.

St. Stephens Elementary School of Catawba County Schools has a Conover postal address, while it is physically is in the Hickory city limits and not the Conover city limits. St. Stephens ES's feeder middle and high schools are H.M. Arndt Middle School and St. Stephens High School.
