= The Catawbans (book series) =

The Catawbans is a series of three books by Gary Freeze on the history and genealogy of Catawba County in North Carolina. Freeze, a professor at Catawba College in Salisbury, was commissioned by the county to write its official history, and his three book series is the result of over twenty years of work on the project. The series includes the following three books:

- The Catawbans: Crafters of a North Carolina County 1747-1900 (1995)
- The Catawbans: Pioneers in Progress (2008)
- The Catawbans: Boomers and Bypasses (2015)
