= North Carolina Highway 127 =

State highway in North Carolina, US

North Carolina Highway 127

Route information
- Maintained by NCDOT
- Length: 24.6 mi (39.6 km)
- Existed: 1940–present

Major junctions
- South end: NC 10 in Propst Crossroads
- US 321 in Mountain View
- North end: US 64 / NC 90 in Ellendale

Location
- Country: United States
- State: North Carolina
- Counties: Catawba, Alexander

Highway system
- North Carolina Highway System; Interstate; US; State; Scenic
← NC 126	→ NC 128

North Carolina Highway 127 (NC 127) is a primary state highway in the U.S. state of North Carolina. It serves similar to a farm-to-market highway, connecting rural Catawba and Alexander counties to Hickory.

== Route description ==
NC 127 is a rural two-lane highway, except in Hickory. It begins at an intersection with NC 10 in the unincorporated Catawba County community of Propst Crossroads and travels north over Jacobs Fork into the census designated place (CDP) of Mountain View. In Mountain View, NC 127 has an interchange with US 321 which provides access to Interstate 40. Following this interchange, the highway enters the town of Brookford, North Carolina and is named Brookford Boulevard. Upon entering Hickory, NC 127 passes over I-40 and US 70/US 321 Business without interchanges. As NC 127 winds into Hickory as a four-lane undivided road, it remains unnamed until it reaches its intersection with 1st Avenue NE where it becomes known as 2nd Street NE.

Heading north through Hickory, NC 127 passes near the Frye Regional Medical Center, Lenoir–Rhyne University, and Hickory High School. The highway is four lanes with a center turn lane throughout the northern sections of Hickory. The highway shrinks to two-lanes wide before crossing the Catawba River into Alexander County and the CDP of Bethlehem. After passing through Bethlehem, the road becomes more winding as it heads into hillier terrain. NC 127 ends at an unsignalized intersection with US 64/NC 90 in the community of Ellendale.

== History ==
Established as a renumbering of NC 96 in 1940; the overall routing has not changed, but has changed roads through Hickory several times.

== Junction list ==
County	Location	mi	km	Destinations	Notes
Catawba	Propst Crossroads	0.0	0.0	NC 10 / Plateau Road – Newton, Shelby	
Catawba	Mountain View	5.7– 6.0	9.2– 9.7	US 321 to I-40 / US 70 – Hickory, Lincolnton	Exit 42 (US 321)
Alexander	Ellendale	24.6	39.6	US 64 / NC 90 – Lenoir, Taylorsville	
1.000 mi = 1.609 km; 1.000 km = 0.621 mi
