= Mountain View, North Carolina =

- Census-designated place
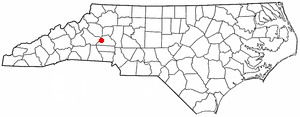
- Location of Mountain View, North Carolina
- Coordinates: 35°40′58″N 81°22′06″W
- Country: United States
- State: North Carolina
- County: Catawba

Area
  - Total: 4.67 sq mi (12.09 km^{2})
  - Land: 4.66 sq mi (12.07 km^{2})
  - Water: 0.012 sq mi (0.03 km^{2})
- Elevation: 1,112 ft (339 m)

Population (2020)
  - Total: 3,590
  - Density: 770.6/sq mi (297.53/km^{2})
- Time zone: UTC-5 (Eastern (EST))
  - Summer (DST): UTC-4 (EDT)
- ZIP code: 28602
- Area code: 828
- FIPS code: 37-44770
- GNIS feature ID: 2403314

Mountain View is a census-designated place (CDP) in Catawba County, North Carolina, United States. As of the 2020 census, Mountain View had a population of 3,590. It is part of the Hickory–Lenoir–Morganton Metropolitan Statistical Area.

== Geography ==
Mountain View is located in western Catawba County. It is bordered to the north by the town of Long View and to the northeast by the town of Brookford. The city of Hickory, located north of Brookford, has been extending its borders through annexation into the Mountain View area and now nearly splits the CDP into north and south halves.

North Carolina Highway 127 passes through the community, leading north 4 miles (6 km) to the center of Hickory and south 4 miles (6 km) to NC Highway 10. U.S. Route 321, a four-lane expressway, crosses the eastern corner of the Mountain View CDP, where its Exit 42 provides access to NC 127. Exit 42 is 1 mile (1.6 km) south of US 321's intersection with Interstate 40 in Hickory.

According to the United States Census Bureau, the Mountain View CDP has a total area of 4.6 square miles (12.0 km^{2}), of which 0.01 square miles (0.03 km^{2}), or 0.22%, is water.

== Demographics ==
Historical population
Census	Pop.	Note	%±
2020	3,590		—
U.S. Decennial Census

=== 2020 census ===
Mountain View racial composition
Race	Number	Percentage
White (non-Hispanic)	2,787	77.63%
Black or African American (non-Hispanic)	242	6.74%
Native American	14	0.39%
Asian	163	4.54%
Pacific Islander	4	0.11%
Other/Mixed	149	4.15%
Hispanic or Latino	231	6.43%

As of the 2020 census, Mountain View had a population of 3,590. The median age was 43.4 years. 22.1% of residents were under the age of 18 and 20.9% of residents were 65 years of age or older. For every 100 females there were 95.1 males, and for every 100 females age 18 and over there were 87.2 males age 18 and over.

91.7% of residents lived in urban areas, while 8.3% lived in rural areas.

There were 1,416 households in Mountain View and 986 families residing in the CDP. Of those households, 29.6% had children under the age of 18 living in them. Of all households, 56.4% were married-couple households, 14.9% were households with a male householder and no spouse or partner present, and 22.7% were households with a female householder and no spouse or partner present. About 23.9% of all households were made up of individuals and 12.5% had someone living alone who was 65 years of age or older.

There were 1,455 housing units, of which 2.7% were vacant. The homeowner vacancy rate was 0.4% and the rental vacancy rate was 2.3%.

=== 2000 census ===
As of the census of 2000, there were 3,768 people, 1,364 households, and 1,104 families residing in the CDP. The population density was 781.4 inhabitants per square mile (301.7/km^{2}). There were 1,404 housing units at an average density of 291.2 per square mile (112.4/km^{2}). The racial makeup of the CDP was 89.15% White, 5.97% African American, 0.35% Native American, 3.29% Asian, 0.16% Pacific Islander, 0.42% from other races, and 0.66% from two or more races. Hispanic or Latino of any race were 1.30% of the population.

There were 1,364 households, out of which 39.5% had children under the age of 18 living with them, 68.0% were married couples living together, 9.7% had a female householder with no husband present, and 19.0% were non-families. 16.6% of all households were made up of individuals, and 5.0% had someone living alone who was 65 years of age or older. The average household size was 2.76 and the average family size was 3.09.

In the CDP, the population was spread out, with 27.5% under the age of 18, 6.3% from 18 to 24, 31.2% from 25 to 44, 27.0% from 45 to 64, and 8.0% who were 65 years of age or older. The median age was 37 years. For every 100 females, there were 94.0 males. For every 100 females age 18 and over, there were 90.5 males.

The median income for a household in the CDP was $51,974, and the median income for a family was $56,313. Males had a median income of $35,635 versus $27,128 for females. The per capita income for the CDP was $22,125. About 2.6% of families and 5.0% of the population were below the poverty line, including 5.3% of those under age 18 and 5.7% of those age 65 or over.

== Education ==
It is in the Catawba County Schools school district.
