= Petersburg, Burke County, North Carolina =

Coordinates: 35°42′23″N 81°40′15″W

Petersburg (formerly Brittain Store) is an unincorporated community in Burke County, North Carolina, United States. It lies at an elevation of 1168 feet (356 m) at coordinates: 35° 42' 23.47" N, 81° 40' 15.35" W. It is part of the Hickory–Lenoir–Morganton Metropolitan Statistical Area.
