= Brookford, North Carolina =

- Town
- Flag

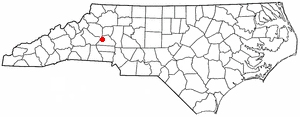
- Location of Brookford, North Carolina
- Coordinates: 35°42′11″N 81°20′45″W
- Country: United States
- State: North Carolina
- County: Catawba

Area
  - Total: 1.02 sq mi (2.63 km^{2})
  - Land: 0.61 sq mi (1.58 km^{2})
  - Water: 0.019 sq mi (0.05 km^{2})
- Elevation: 988 ft (301 m)

Population (2020)
  - Total: 442
  - Density: 725.3/sq mi (280.03/km^{2})
- Time zone: UTC-5 (Eastern (EST))
  - Summer (DST): UTC-4 (EDT)
- ZIP code: 28602
- Area code: 828
- FIPS code: 37-08140
- GNIS feature ID: 2405328
- Website: townofbrookford.com

Brookford is a town in Catawba County, North Carolina, United States. The population was 442 at the 2020 census. It is part of the Hickory–Lenoir–Morganton Metropolitan Statistical Area. The Town of Brookford was incorporated March 1, 1907. Brookford began as a mill village, deriving its name from the combination of the two owner's names Holbrook and Shuford. The town has 4.56 miles of roadage.

== Geography ==
Brookford is located in western Catawba County. It is bordered to the north by the City of Hickory and to the southwest by the unincorporated community of Mountain View.

The town is located just to the southeast of the junction of Interstate 40 with U.S. Route 321 south of Hickory. As both of those highways are limited-access, the closest direct access to Brookford is from Exit 42 on US 321, southwest of the town. The exit connects to North Carolina Highway 127, known as Brookford Boulevard, which runs through the center of the town.

Brookford is located on hills on the north side of the Henry Fork River, a tributary of the South Fork Catawba River. According to the United States Census Bureau, the town has a total area of 0.62 square miles (1.6 km^{2}), of which 0.019 square miles (0.05 km^{2}), or 3.09%, is water.

== Demographics ==
Historical population
Census	Pop.	Note	%±
1910	725		—
1920	709		−2.2%
1930	694		−2.1%
1940	910		31.1%
1950	768		−15.6%
1960	596		−22.4%
1970	590		−1.0%
1980	467		−20.8%
1990	451		−3.4%
2000	434		−3.8%
2010	382		−12.0%
2020	442		15.7%
U.S. Decennial Census

As of the census of 2010, there were 383 people, 200 households, and 129 families residing in the town. The population density was 273.6 inhabitants per square mile (105.6/km^{2}). There were 212 housing units at an average density of 385.8 per square mile (149.0/km^{2}). The racial makeup of the town was 89.40% White, 1.84% African American, 5.76% Asian, 2.07% from other races, and 0.92% from two or more races. Hispanic or Latino of any race were 2.76% of the population.

There were 200 households, out of which 20.5% had children under the age of 18 living with them, 44.0% were married couples living together, 14.5% had a female householder with no husband present, and 35.5% were non-families. 33.0% of all households were made up of individuals, and 16.0% had someone living alone who was 65 years of age or older. The average household size was 2.17 and the average family size was 2.73.

In the town, the population was spread out, with 19.1% under the age of 18, 8.5% from 18 to 24, 26.3% from 25 to 44, 24.7% from 45 to 64, and 21.4% who were 65 years of age or older. The median age was 42 years. For every 100 females, there were 84.7 males. For every 100 females age 18 and over, there were 81.9 males.

The median income for a household in the town was $27,375, and the median income for a family was $37,500. Males had a median income of $28,036 versus $19,659 for females. The per capita income for the town was $13,634. About 6.0% of families and 10.5% of the population were below the poverty line, including 16.8% of those under age 18 and 17.2% of those age 65 or over.

== Education ==
Most of Brookford is in the Hickory City Schools school district. A portion is in the Catawba County Schools school district.

== In popular culture ==
The Brookford Police Department has been featured on On Patrol: Live. The only full-time employee is 25-year-old Chief of Police Will Armstrong.
