= North Carolina Highway 90 =

State highway in North Carolina, US

North Carolina Highway 90

Route information
- Maintained by NCDOT
- Length: 71.7 mi (115.4 km)
- Existed: 1921–present

Major junctions
- West end: Edgemont Road (SR 1420) in Edgemont
- US 321 in Lenoir; US 64 / NC 18 in Lenoir; I-40 in Statesville
- East end: US 21 / US 64 in Statesville

Location
- Country: United States
- State: North Carolina
- Counties: Caldwell, Alexander, Iredell

Highway system
- North Carolina Highway System; Interstate; US; State; Scenic
← NC 89	→ NC 91

North Carolina Highway 90 (NC 90) is a primary state highway in the U.S. state of North Carolina. It is one of the few highways in the state with an unpaved portion.

== Route description ==
The western terminus is in Edgemont (in Caldwell County) at an intersection with Edgemont Road (SR 1420), Roseboro Road (Pisgah National Forest FR 981) and Edgemont Church Place (SR 1358). The first 8 miles (13 km) of the highway are quite curvy and unpaved. NC 90 enters Lenoir on Valway Road (SR 1352). The route then turns left onto N. Main Street to then overlap with US 321 on Blowing Rock Boulevard. NC 90 then turn left, after 2 miles, onto Wilkesboro Boulevard to overlap with US 64 and NC 18. After about 2 miles, the route then turns right onto Taylorsville Road, keeping and overlap with US 64. After 40 miles, going through Taylorsville, NC 90 ends at US 21/US 64 in Statesville.

== History ==
Established in 1921 as an original state highway, it started at NC 50 (Person Street), in Raleigh, going east to Columbia. In 1927, NC 90 was extended west from Raleigh to Lenoir at NC 18. In 1929, NC 90 extended east from Columbia to Fort Landing.

In 1932, US 64 was established and was overlapped on NC 90 from just west of Statesville to Fort Landing. In late 1934, NC 90 was removed from all overlap with US 64 east of Statesville; at same time, NC 90 was extended west from Lenoir to US 221 near Linville, replacing NC 171.

Sometime between 1939 and 1944, NC 90 was extended east back in Statesville to its current east terminus, replacing some of US 64 through the downtown area. At some point in the 1960s, NC 90 was truncated to its current west terminus in Edgemont, its former route to Linville moved under Pisgah National Forest management.

In 2008, NC 90 was removed from downtown Lenoir, creating an overlap with US 321.

== Major intersections ==
County	Location	mi	km	Destinations	Notes
Caldwell	Edgemont	0.0	0.0	Edgemont Road / National Forest Road	
Caldwell	Lenoir	27.9	44.9	US 321 north (Blowing Rock Boulevard) – Boone	North end of US 321 overlap
Caldwell	Lenoir	30.1	48.4	US 64 west / NC 18 south (Harper Avenue) / US 321 south (Hickory Boulevard) – Downtown Lenoir, Hickory	South end of US 321/NC 18 and west end of US 64 overlap
Caldwell	Lenoir	31.5	50.7	NC 18 north (Wilkesboro Boulevard) – Moravian Falls, Wilkesboro	North end of NC 18 overlap
Alexander	Ellendale	46.0	74.0	NC 127 south – Hickory	Northern terminus of NC 127
Alexander		49.2	79.2	US 64 east / Golf Course Lane – Statesville	East end of US 64 overlap
Alexander	Taylorsville	50.4	81.1	NC 16 north – Moravian Falls, Wilkesboro	North end of NC 16 overlap
Alexander	Taylorsville	50.8	81.8	NC 16 south – Conover	South end of NC 16 overlap
Iredell		67.7	109.0	US 64 west – Taylorsville, Lenoir	West end of US 64 overlap
Iredell	Statesville	68.3	109.9	I-40 – Hickory, Winston-Salem	
Iredell	Statesville	69.6	112.0	US 70 (Newton Drive / Garner Bagnal Boulevard) to I-77 – Statesville Regional Airport, Hickory	
Iredell	Statesville	70.4	113.3	US 64 east (Front Street)	East end of US 64 overlap
Iredell	Statesville	71.4	114.9	NC 115 (Center Street) – North Wilkesboro	
Iredell	Statesville	71.7	115.4	US 21 (Davie Avenue) / US 64 – Harmony, Mocksville	
1.000 mi = 1.609 km; 1.000 km = 0.621 mi: Concurrency terminus

== Special routes ==
=== Rocky Mount alternate route ===
North Carolina Highway 90A
- Location: Rocky Mount, North Carolina
- Existed: 1932–1934

North Carolina Highway 90 Alternate (NC 90A) was new alternate routing through downtown Rocky Mount, via Thomas Avenue. In 1934, it was replaced by US 64A.

== See also ==
- North Carolina Bicycle Route 2 - Concurrent with NC 90 from US 64 / NC 18 in Lenoir to Main Avenue Drive in Taylorsville
