= Fort Landing, North Carolina =

Fort Landing
- Unincorporated community
- Location within the state of North Carolina
- Coordinates: 35°56′41″N 76°03′51″W
- Country: United States
- State: North Carolina
- County: Tyrrell County
- First settled: 1700
- Elevation: 3.000 ft (0.9144 m)
- Time zone: UTC-5 (Eastern (EST))
  - Summer (DST): UTC-4 (EDT)
- ZIP code: 27925
- Area code: 252
- GNIS feature ID: 1020330

Fort Landing is an unincorporated community in Tyrrell County, North Carolina, United States. The community is located on the western banks of the Little Alligator River/East Lake; 13 miles (21 km) east of Columbia. From 1932 to 1951, Fort Landing was the eastern terminus of US 64.

== History ==
Following Thomas Miller and Joshua Tarkenton's expedition in 1680, the first settlers started to come in the area in the year 1700, stationing themselves in the area known as "Alligator Creek". The settlement came to be due to the necessity of creating a functioning log stockade protecting against local Native Americans. The area was supposed to be temporarily used, but stuck around and developed into a local community.

Fort Landing was granted a US Post Office on April 2, 1856, led by Postmaster was Mr. William J. Beasley, the very first one in the community. However, on May 15, 1931, the Post Office closed forever.
