= Icard, North Carolina =

- Census-designated place
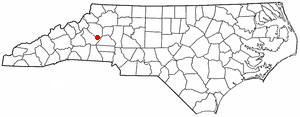
- Location of Icard, North Carolina
- Coordinates: 35°43′31″N 81°27′29″W
- Country: United States
- State: North Carolina
- County: Burke

Area
  - Total: 3.83 sq mi (9.93 km^{2})
  - Land: 3.83 sq mi (9.91 km^{2})
  - Water: 0.0077 sq mi (0.02 km^{2})
- Elevation: 1,148 ft (350 m)

Population (2020)
  - Total: 2,452
  - Density: 640.9/sq mi (247.44/km^{2})
- Time zone: UTC-5 (Eastern (EST))
  - Summer (DST): UTC-4 (EDT)
- ZIP code: 28666
- Area code: 828
- FIPS code: 37-33320
- GNIS feature ID: 2402608

Icard (/ˈaɪkərd/ EYE-kurd) is a census-designated place (CDP) in Burke County, North Carolina, United States. As of the 2020 census, Icard had a population of 2,452. It is part of the Hickory–Lenoir–Morganton Metropolitan Statistical Area.

== Geography ==
Icard is located in eastern Burke County. It is bordered to the east by the town of Hildebran.

U.S. Route 70 is the main local road through the town, leading east 8 miles (13 km) to Hickory and west 13 miles (21 km) to Morganton. Interstate 40 parallels US-70, with access to Icard from Exit 116.

According to the United States Census Bureau, the CDP has a total area of 3.8 square miles (9.9 km^{2}), of which 0.008 square miles (0.02 km^{2}), or 0.25%, is water.

== Demographics ==
Historical population
Census	Pop.	Note	%±
2020	2,452		—
U.S. Decennial Census

=== 2020 census ===
As of the 2020 census, Icard had a population of 2,452. The median age was 42.4 years. 20.6% of residents were under the age of 18 and 19.7% were 65 years of age or older. For every 100 females, there were 93.8 males, and for every 100 females age 18 and over, there were 91.3 males age 18 and over. There were 962 households in the CDP, including 673 families.

90.6% of residents lived in urban areas, while 9.4% lived in rural areas.

Of Icard's households, 31.9% had children under the age of 18 living in them. 49.7% were married-couple households, 17.8% were households with a male householder and no spouse or partner present, and 23.7% were households with a female householder and no spouse or partner present. About 23.6% of all households were made up of individuals, and 9.7% had someone living alone who was 65 years of age or older.

There were 1,083 housing units, of which 11.2% were vacant. The homeowner vacancy rate was 2.1% and the rental vacancy rate was 9.5%.

Icard racial composition
Race	Number	Percentage
White (non-Hispanic)	2,039	83.16%
Black or African American (non-Hispanic)	16	0.65%
Native American	4	0.16%
Asian	131	5.34%
Other/Mixed	105	4.28%
Hispanic or Latino	157	6.4%

=== 2000 census ===
As of the census of 2000, there were 2,734 people, 1,121 households, and 784 families residing in the CDP. The population density was 696.4 inhabitants per square mile (268.9/km^{2}). There were 1,198 housing units at an average density of 305.1 per square mile (117.8/km^{2}). The racial makeup of the CDP was 96.89% White, 0.48% African American, 0.15% Native American, 1.79% Asian, 0.18% from other races, and 0.51% from two or more races. Hispanic or Latino of any race were 0.66% of the population.

There were 1,121 households, out of which 32.9% had children under the age of 18 living with them, 54.3% were married couples living together, 11.0% had a female householder with no husband present, and 30.0% were non-families. 26.3% of all households were made up of individuals, and 10.0% had someone living alone who was 65 years of age or older. The average household size was 2.44 and the average family size was 2.92.

In the CDP, the population was spread out, with 24.7% under the age of 18, 7.4% from 18 to 24, 33.5% from 25 to 44, 24.2% from 45 to 64, and 10.2% who were 65 years of age or older. The median age was 36 years. For every 100 females, there were 96.1 males. For every 100 females age 18 and over, there were 92.5 males.

The median income for a household in the CDP was $35,804, and the median income for a family was $42,853. Males had a median income of $25,060 versus $22,675 for females. The per capita income for the CDP was $16,784. About 1.6% of families and 3.4% of the population were below the poverty line, including 1.5% of those under age 18 and 2.3% of those age 65 or over.

== Education ==
The town is served by the Burke County Public Schools system. Some schools in or near the town include:

- East Burke Middle School
- East Burke High School
- Hildebran Elementary School
- Icard Elementary School
