= Drexel, North Carolina =

- Town
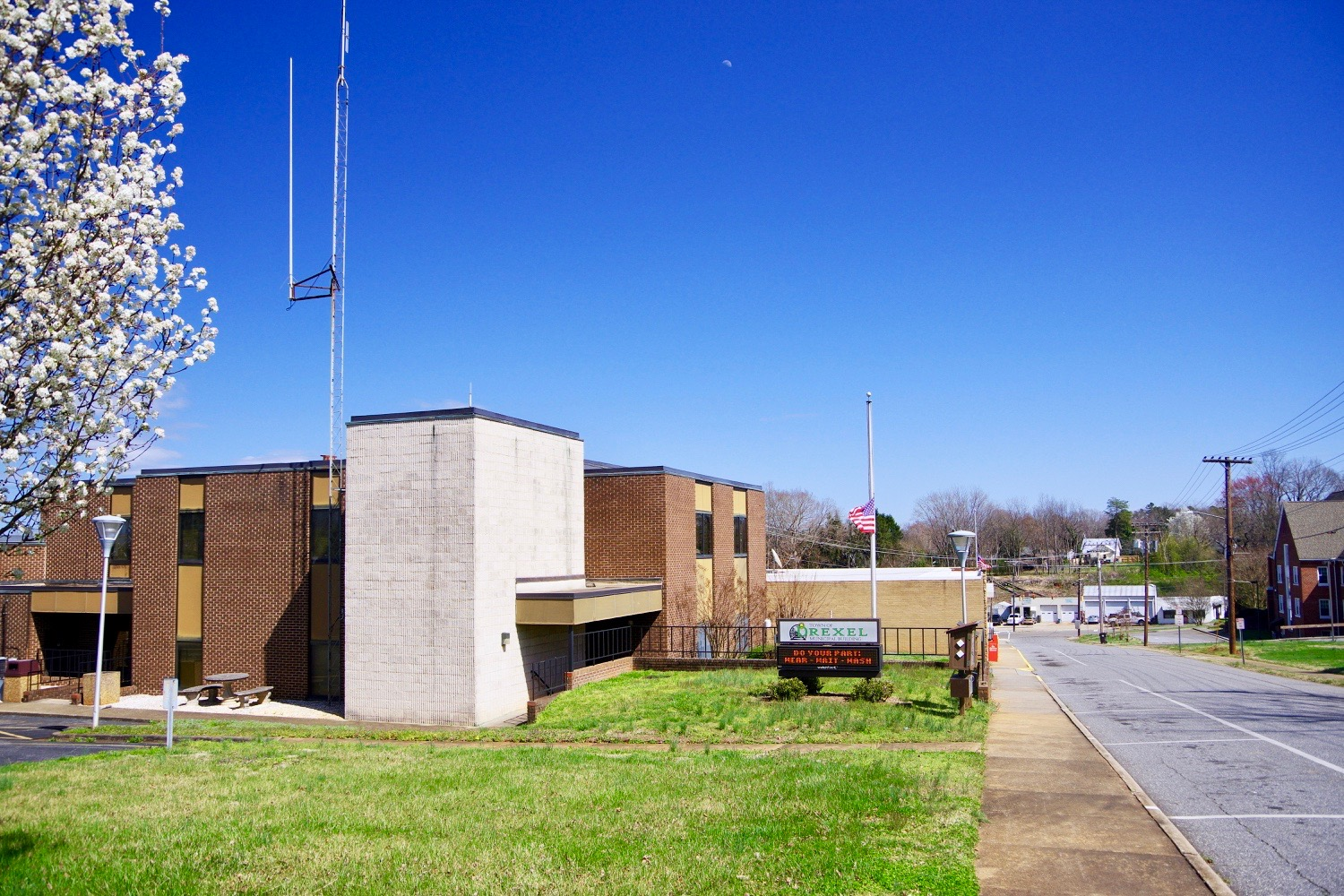
- Town Hall

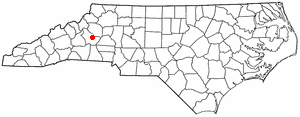
- Location in North Carolina
- Coordinates: 35°45′25″N 81°36′32″W
- Country: United States
- State: North Carolina
- County: Burke

Area
  - Total: 1.38 sq mi (3.58 km^{2})
  - Land: 1.38 sq mi (3.58 km^{2})
  - Water: 0 sq mi (0.00 km^{2})
- Elevation: 1,221 ft (372 m)

Population (2020)
  - Total: 1,760
  - Density: 1,273.8/sq mi (491.82/km^{2})
- Time zone: UTC-5 (Eastern (EST))
  - Summer (DST): UTC-4 (EDT)
- ZIP code: 28619
- Area code: 828
- FIPS code: 37-17860
- GNIS feature ID: 2406396
- Website: www.ci.drexel.nc.us

Drexel is a town in Burke County, North Carolina, United States. As of the 2020 census, Drexel had a population of 1,760. It is part of the Hickory–Lenoir–Morganton Metropolitan Statistical Area.

== Geography ==
Drexel is located in eastern Burke County. It is 6 miles (10 km) east of Morganton, the county seat.

According to the United States Census Bureau, the town has a total area of 1.4 square miles (3.5 km^{2}), all land.

== Demographics ==
Historical population
Census	Pop.	Note	%±
1920	392		—
1930	781		99.2%
1940	681		−12.8%
1950	988		45.1%
1960	1,146		16.0%
1970	1,431		24.9%
1980	1,392		−2.7%
1990	1,746		25.4%
2000	1,938		11.0%
2010	1,858		−4.1%
2020	1,760		−5.3%
U.S. Decennial Census

=== 2020 census ===
Drexel racial composition
Race	Number	Percentage
White (non-Hispanic)	1,428	81.14%
Black or African American (non-Hispanic)	70	3.98%
Native American	8	0.45%
Asian	51	2.9%
Other/Mixed	80	4.55%
Hispanic or Latino	123	6.99%

As of the 2020 census, Drexel had a population of 1,760. The median age was 46.7 years. 18.6% of residents were under the age of 18 and 24.9% of residents were 65 years of age or older. For every 100 females, there were 85.1 males, and for every 100 females age 18 and over, there were 77.8 males age 18 and over.

100.0% of residents lived in urban areas, while 0.0% lived in rural areas.

There were 720 households in Drexel, of which 27.2% had children under the age of 18 living in them. Of all households, 42.2% were married-couple households, 16.7% were households with a male householder and no spouse or partner present, and 35.1% were households with a female householder and no spouse or partner present. About 32.0% of all households were made up of individuals, and 15.9% had someone living alone who was 65 years of age or older.

There were 811 housing units, of which 11.2% were vacant. The homeowner vacancy rate was 2.6% and the rental vacancy rate was 10.4%.

=== 2000 census ===
As of the census of 2000, there were 1,938 people, 759 households, and 503 families residing in the town. The population density was 1,383.9 inhabitants per square mile (534.3/km^{2}). There were 811 housing units at an average density of 579.1 per square mile (223.6/km^{2}). The racial makeup of the town was 84.47% White, 3.87% African American, 0.41% Native American, 6.97% Asian, 3.41% from other races, and 0.88% from two or more races. Hispanic or Latino of any race were 3.97% of the population.

There were 759 households, out of which 31.2% had children under the age of 18 living with them, 48.7% were married couples living together, 13.3% had a female householder with no husband present, and 33.6% were non-families. 30.3% of all households were made up of individuals, and 13.8% had someone living alone who was 65 years of age or older. The average household size was 2.40 and the average family size was 3.00.

In the town, the population was spread out, with 25.4% under the age of 18, 7.1% from 18 to 24, 28.0% from 25 to 44, 19.8% from 45 to 64, and 19.7% who were 65 years of age or older. The median age was 38 years. For every 100 females, there were 81.3 males. For every 100 females age 18 and over, there were 75.4 males.

The median income for a household in the town was $35,086, and the median income for a family was $41,917. Males had a median income of $28,500 versus $22,827 for females. The per capita income for the town was $18,463. About 4.9% of families and 7.1% of the population were below the poverty line, including 4.9% of those under age 18 and 15.0% of those age 65 or over.
