= Banoak, North Carolina =

- Unincorporated community
- Location within North Carolina Location within the United States
- Coordinates: 35°35′10″N 81°24′32″W
- Country: United States
- State: North Carolina
- County: Catawba
- Elevation: 1,175 ft (358 m)
- Time zone: UTC-5 (Eastern (EST))
  - Summer (DST): UTC-4 (EDT)
- Area code: 828
- GNIS feature ID: 980533

Banoak (also known as Corinth) is an unincorporated community in Catawba County, North Carolina, United States. Banoak is located on North Carolina Highway 10, 10.8 miles (17.4 km) south-southwest of Hickory.
