= Bethlehem, Alexander County, North Carolina =

Bethlehem, North Carolina
- Census-designated place
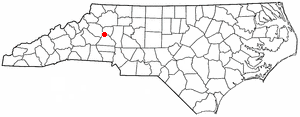
- Location of Bethlehem, North Carolina
- Coordinates: 35°48′58″N 81°17′46″W
- Country: United States
- State: North Carolina
- County: Alexander

Area
  - Total: 8.88 sq mi (23.00 km^{2})
  - Land: 7.63 sq mi (19.75 km^{2})
  - Water: 1.25 sq mi (3.25 km^{2})
- Elevation: 1,142 ft (348 m)

Population (2020)
  - Total: 4,491
  - Density: 589.0/sq mi (227.41/km^{2})
- Time zone: UTC-5 (Eastern (EST))
  - Summer (DST): UTC-4 (EDT)
- FIPS code: 37-05530
- GNIS feature ID: 2402685

Bethlehem is a census-designated place (CDP) in Alexander County, North Carolina, United States. The population was 4,214 at the 2010 census. It is part of the Hickory–Lenoir–Morganton Metropolitan Statistical Area.

== Geography ==
According to the United States Census Bureau, the CDP has a total area of 8.9 square miles (23.0 km^{2}), of which 7.6 square miles (19.7 km^{2}) is land and 1.3 square miles (3.3 km^{2}), or 14.15%, is water. The CDP occupies a large area in the southwestern corner of Alexander County, along the north shore of Lake Hickory on the Catawba River.

== Demographics ==
Historical population
Census	Pop.	Note	%±
2020	4,491		—
U.S. Decennial Census

=== 2020 census ===
Bethlehem racial composition
Race	Number	Percentage
White (non-Hispanic)	3,971	88.42%
Black or African American (non-Hispanic)	79	1.76%
Native American	10	0.22%
Asian	117	2.61%
Other/Mixed	154	3.43%
Hispanic or Latino	160	3.56%

As of the 2020 United States census, there were 4,491 people, 1,900 households, and 1,392 families residing in the CDP.

=== 2000 census ===
As of the census of 2000, there were 3,713 people, 1,454 households, and 1,142 families residing in the CDP. The population density was 488.9 inhabitants per square mile (188.8/km^{2}). There were 1,549 housing units at an average density of 204.0 per square mile (78.8/km^{2}). The racial makeup of the CDP was 96.88% White, 0.51% African American, 0.03% Native American, 1.40% Asian, 0.70% from other races, and 0.48% from two or more races. Hispanic or Latino of any race were 1.78% of the population.

There were 1,454 households, out of which 31.9% had children under the age of 18 living with them, 69.1% were married couples living together, 6.7% had a female householder with no husband present, and 21.4% were non-families. 18.0% of all households were made up of individuals, and 5.8% had someone living alone who was 65 years of age or older. The average household size was 2.55 and the average family size was 2.88.

In the CDP, the population was spread out, with 23.4% under the age of 18, 6.5% from 18 to 24, 30.4% from 25 to 44, 29.4% from 45 to 64, and 10.3% who were 65 years of age or older. The median age was 39 years. For every 100 females, there were 96.5 males. For every 100 females age 18 and over, there were 97.2 males.

The median income for a household in the CDP was $52,443, and the median income for a family was $56,776. Males had a median income of $34,023 versus $26,944 for females. The per capita income for the CDP was $28,537. About 4.0% of families and 5.0% of the population were below the poverty line, including 5.5% of those under age 18 and 5.0% of those age 65 or over.
