= Long View, North Carolina =

- Town
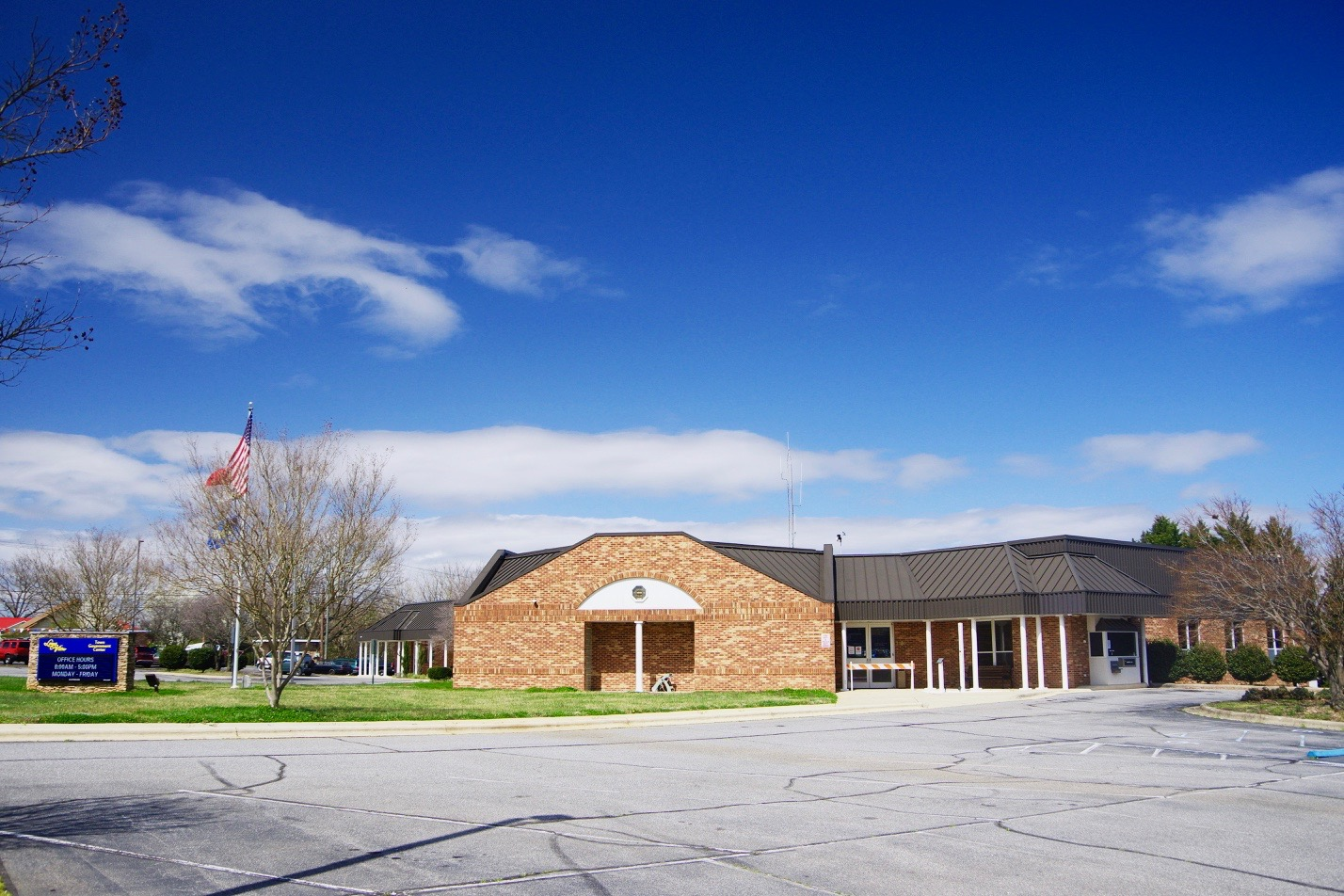
- Long View Government Center

- Flag Seal

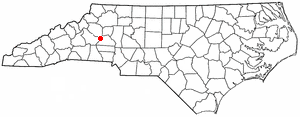
- Location of Long View, North Carolina
- Coordinates: 35°43′18″N 81°23′09″W
- Country: United States
- State: North Carolina
- Counties: Catawba, Burke

Area
  - Total: 4.03 sq mi (10.45 km^{2})
  - Land: 4.02 sq mi (10.42 km^{2})
  - Water: 0.012 sq mi (0.03 km^{2})
- Elevation: 1,079 ft (329 m)

Population (2020)
  - Total: 5,088
  - Density: 1,264/sq mi (488.2/km^{2})
- Time zone: UTC-5 (Eastern (EST))
  - Summer (DST): UTC-4 (EDT)
- ZIP codes: 28601-28602
- Area code: 828
- FIPS code: 37-39280
- GNIS feature ID: 2406040
- Website: www.longviewnc.gov

Long View is a town in Burke and Catawba counties in the U.S. state of North Carolina. As of the 2020 census, Long View had a population of 5,088. It is part of the Hickory–Lenoir–Morganton Metropolitan Statistical Area.

== History ==
Originally known as "Penelope," Long View was incorporated in 1907.

== Geography ==
Long View is located in western Catawba County and eastern Burke County. It is bordered to the north and east by the city of Hickory, to the west by the town of Hildebran, and to the south by the census-designated place of Mountain View.

U.S. Route 70 passes through Long View, leading east into Hickory and west 18 miles (29 km) to Morganton. Interstate 40 crosses the southern part of Long View, with access from Exit 121 (Old Shelby Road/33rd Street).

According to the United States Census Bureau, the town has a total area of 3.9 square miles (10.2 km^{2}), of which 0.012 square miles (0.03 km^{2}), or 0.26%, is water.

== Demographics ==
Historical population
Census	Pop.	Note	%±
1910	243		—
1920	755		210.7%
1930	1,262		67.2%
1940	1,489		18.0%
1950	2,291		53.9%
1960	2,997		30.8%
1970	3,360		12.1%
1980	3,587		6.8%
1990	3,229		−10.0%
2000	4,722		46.2%
2010	4,871		3.2%
2020	5,088		4.5%
2025 (est.)	5,387	▲	5.9%
U.S. Decennial Census

=== 2020 census ===
Long View racial composition
Race	Number	Percentage
White (non-Hispanic)	3,050	59.94%
Black or African American (non-Hispanic)	623	12.24%
Native American	18	0.35%
Asian	277	5.44%
Pacific Islander	6	0.12%
Other/Mixed	280	5.5%
Hispanic or Latino	834	16.39%

As of the 2020 census, Long View had a population of 5,088, with 2,127 households and 1,267 families.

The median age was 38.6 years. 21.7% of residents were under the age of 18 and 17.0% of residents were 65 years of age or older. For every 100 females there were 97.7 males, and for every 100 females age 18 and over there were 95.0 males age 18 and over.

99.9% of residents lived in urban areas, while 0.1% lived in rural areas.

Of all households, 30.1% had children under the age of 18 living in them. Of all households, 35.4% were married-couple households, 23.6% were households with a male householder and no spouse or partner present, and 31.9% were households with a female householder and no spouse or partner present. About 31.2% of all households were made up of individuals and 14.1% had someone living alone who was 65 years of age or older.

There were 2,353 housing units, of which 9.6% were vacant. The homeowner vacancy rate was 1.6% and the rental vacancy rate was 7.4%.

=== 2010 census ===
As of the census of 2010, there were 4,871 people, 2,067 households, and 1,272 families residing in the town. The population density was 1,237 inhabitants per square mile (478/km^{2}). There were 2,315 housing units at an average density of 587.6 units per square mile (226.9 units/km^{2}). The racial makeup of the town was 74.5% White, 11.4% African American, 0.4% Native American, 5.0% Asian, 5.7% some other race, and 3.0% from two or more races. Hispanic or Latino of any race were 10.6% of the population.

There were 2,067 households, out of which 28.8% had children under the age of 18 living with them, 39.3% were headed by married couples living together, 15.4% had a female householder with no husband present, and 38.5% were non-families. 32.1% of all households were made up of individuals, and 12.9% were someone living alone who was 65 years of age or older. The average household size was 2.36 and the average family size was 2.95.

In the town, the population was spread out, with 22.3% under the age of 18, 9.1% from 18 to 24, 27.3% from 25 to 44, 25.5% from 45 to 64, and 15.8% who were 65 years of age or older. The median age was 38.8 years. For every 100 females, there were 96.6 males. For every 100 females age 18 and over, there were 94.2 males.

For the period 2008–12, the estimated median annual income for a household in the town was $31,015, and the median income for a family was $39,281. Male full-time workers had a median income of $30,054 versus $25,989 for females. The per capita income for the town was $16,547. About 13.5% of families and 20.6% of the population were below the poverty line, including 37.7% of those under age 18 and 7.5% of those age 65 or over.

== Education ==
The portion in Catawba County is in the Hickory City Schools school district.

The portion in Burke County is in the Burke County Public Schools.
