= Burke County, North Carolina =

County in North Carolina, United States

- County
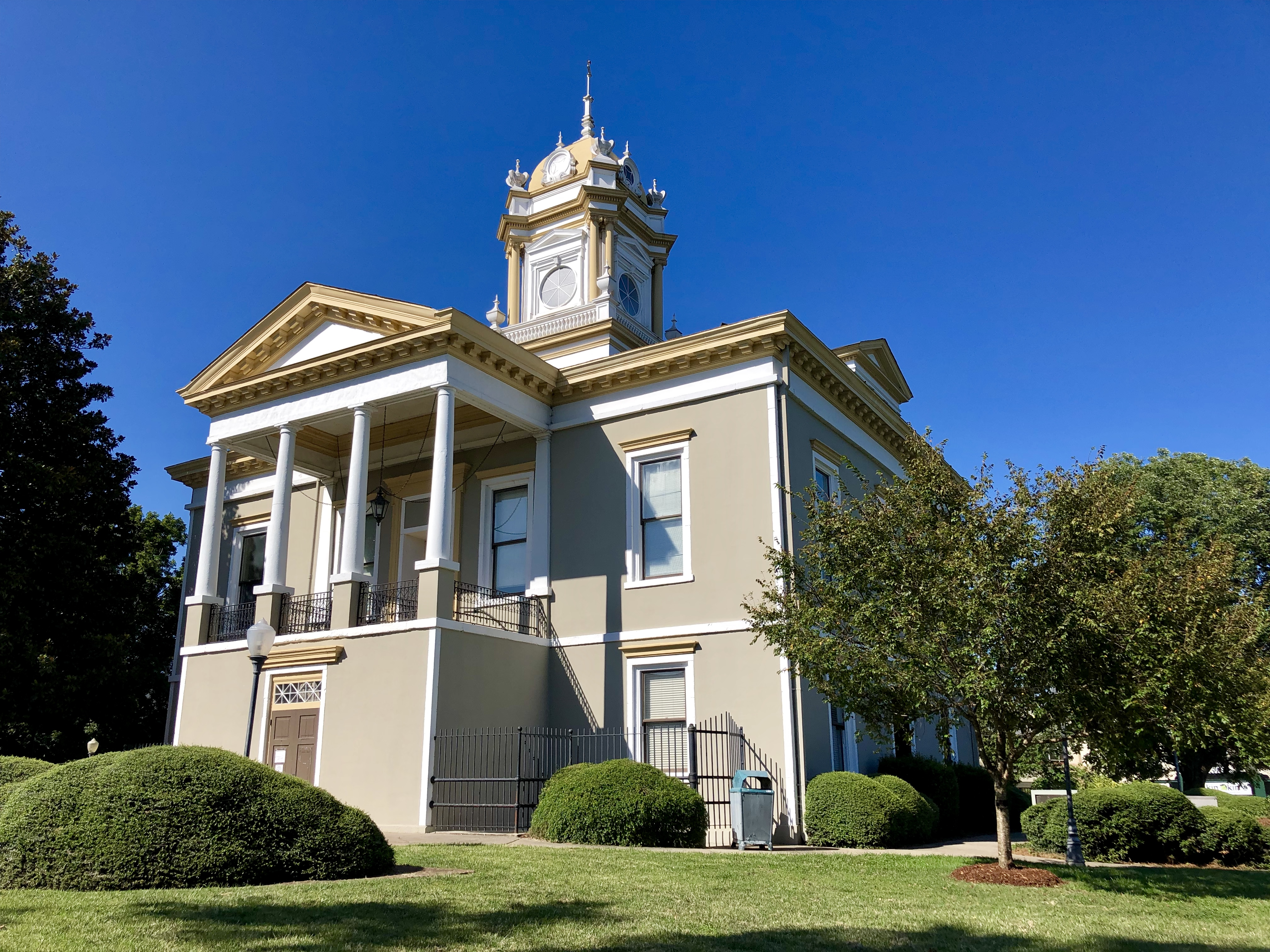
- Burke County Courthouse in Morganton

- Seal Logo
- Motto: "All About Advancing"
- Location within the U.S. state of North Carolina
- Interactive map of Burke County, North Carolina
- Coordinates: 35.75°N 81.71°W
- Country: United States
- State: North Carolina
- Founded: 1777
- Named for: Thomas Burke
- Seat: Morganton
- Largest community: Morganton

Area
  - Total: 514.24 sq mi (1,331.9 km^{2})
  - Land: 506.24 sq mi (1,311.2 km^{2})
  - Water: 8.00 sq mi (20.7 km^{2}) 1.56%

Population (2020)
  - Total: 87,570
  - Estimate (2025): 88,655 ▲
  - Density: 172.98/sq mi (66.79/km^{2})
- Time zone: UTC−5 (Eastern)
  - Summer (DST): UTC−4 (EDT)
- Congressional district: 14th
- Website: www.burkenc.org

Burke County is a county in the U.S. state of North Carolina. It is part of the state's western mountain region, containing sections of the Blue Ridge Mountains including the Linville Gorge and South Mountains. As of the 2020 census, its population was 87,570. Its county seat is Morganton. Burke County is part of the Hickory-Lenoir-Morganton, NC Metropolitan Statistical Area.

== History ==
=== Early history ===
Indigenous peoples inhabited the interior and the coastal areas for thousands of years. Native Americans of the complex and far-flung Mississippian culture inhabited the county long before Europeans arrived in the New World. They were part of a trade network extending from the Gulf Coast to the Great Lakes. They built earthwork mounds, including at Joara, a 12-acre (4.9 ha) site and regional chiefdom in North Carolina, near present-day Morganton. It was the center of the largest Native American settlement in North Carolina, dating from about 1000 AD and expanding into the next centuries.

In 1567, Spanish Juan Pardo's expedition arrived and built Fort San Juan at Joara, claiming the area for the colony of Spanish Florida. Pardo named the settlement Cuenca, after his home city. They had been sent by the governor at Santa Elena (Parris Island) in South Carolina to find an overland route to the silver mines in central Mexico, believing that the Appalachians were connected to a range there.

Captain Juan Pardo, leader of the expedition, left about 30 soldiers at the fort while continuing his exploration. His expedition built another five forts to the west, in the foothills of the mountains. In the spring of 1568, the Indians attacked Fort San Juan, killing the soldiers and burning the fort. The natives killed all soldiers except one at the garrisons, at five other Spanish forts in the interior.

A record of Pardo's expedition was not discovered and translated into English until the late 20th century. In the 1990s, excavation was started at a site believed to be Joara, continuing into the 21st century. In 2013, archeologists announced that they had found remains of Fort San Juan at Joara, confirming early accounts. This has changed knowledge and interpretation of early European encounters and colonization efforts in what would become the United States, as Spanish efforts preceded the successful efforts of England in Jamestown, Virginia, by 40 years.

=== 18th century ===
In 1777, during the American Revolutionary War, Burke County was formed from Rowan County. It was named for Thomas Burke, then serving as a delegate to the Continental Congress (1777 to 1781). He was later elected as governor of North Carolina, serving one term from 1781 to 1782. The western Piedmont was settled by many Scots-Irish and German immigrants in the mid- to late 18th century. They were generally yeoman farmers and fiercely independent.

The Burke County Regiment participated in the Battle of Kings Mountain, which pitted Appalachian frontiersmen against the Loyalist forces of British commander Ferguson at Kings Mountain, SC, in the American Revolution. Rather than waiting for Ferguson to invade their territory, militiamen throughout the Blue Ridge who crossed over the mountains to meet the enemy were known as the Over Mountain Men.

As population increased, the county was divided to form other jurisdictions. In 1791, parts of Burke County and Rutherford County were combined to form Buncombe County.

=== 19th century ===
In 1833, parts of Burke and Buncombe Counties were combined to form Yancey County. In 1841, parts of Burke and Wilkes Counties were combined to form Caldwell County. In 1842, additional parts of Burke and Rutherford Counties were combined to form McDowell County. Finally, in 1861, parts of Burke, Caldwell, McDowell, Watauga, and Yancey Counties were combined to form Mitchell County.

== Geography ==
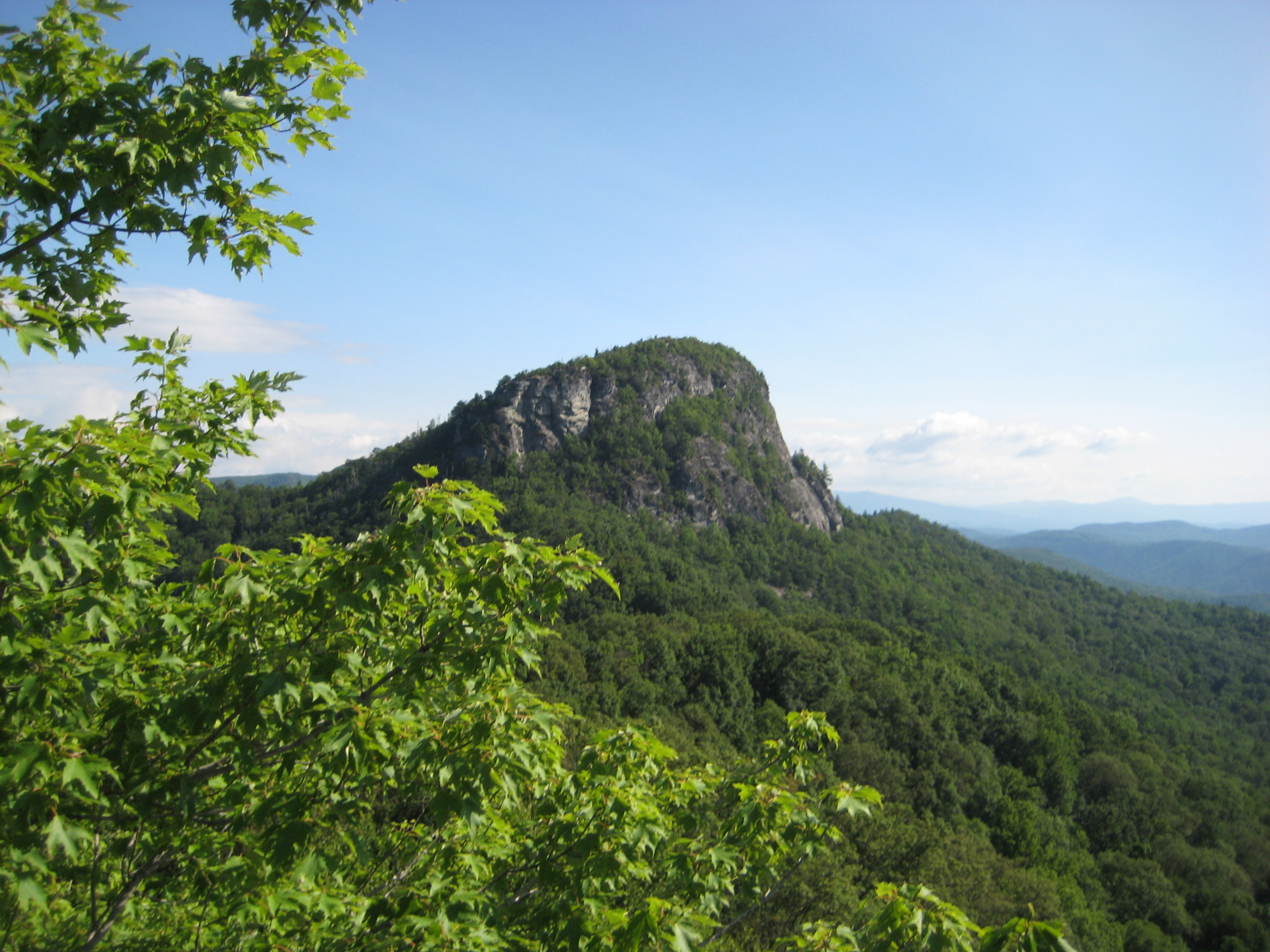
Table Rock

According to the U.S. Census Bureau, the county has a total area of 514.24 square miles (1,331.9 km^{2}), of which 506.24 square miles (1,311.2 km^{2}) is land and 8.00 square miles (20.7 km^{2}) (1.56%) is water. The county contains portions of two lakes: Lake James along its western border with McDowell County and Lake Rhodhiss along its northeastern border with Caldwell County.

Table Rock, a prominent peak in the county in the east rim of Linville Gorge, part of Pisgah National Forest, has been described as "the most visible symbol in the region".

In the southern part of the county, the South Mountains State Park covers almost 21,000-acre (8,500 ha) and features waterfalls and hiking trails.

=== National protected areas ===
- Blue Ridge Parkway (part)
- Linville Falls
- Linville Gorge Wilderness (part)
- Pisgah National Forest (part)

=== State and local protected areas ===
- Johns River Game Land
- Lake James State Park (part)
- Pisgah National Forest Game Land (part)
- Pisgah (WRC) Game Land (part)
- South Mountains Game Lands (part)
- South Mountains State Park

=== Major water bodies ===
- Canoe Creek
- Catawba River
- Dales Creek
- Drowning Creek
- Hall Creek
- Henry Fork
- Irish Creek
- Jacob Fork
- Lake James
- Lake Rhodhiss
- Linville River
- Little River
- Old Catawba River
- Pearcey Creek
- Rock Creek
- Roses Creek
- Silver Creek
- Upper Creek

=== Adjacent counties ===
- Avery County – northwest
- Caldwell County – north
- Catawba County – east
- Cleveland County – south
- Rutherford County – south
- McDowell County – west

=== Major highways ===
- I-40
- US 64
- US 64 Bus.
- US 70
- US 70 Bus.
- US 221
- US 321
- NC 18
- NC 114
- NC 126
- NC 181
- NC 183

=== Major infrastructure ===
- Foothills Regional Airport (partially in Caldwell County)
- Hickory Regional Airport (partially in Catawba County)

== Demographics ==
Historical population
| Census | Pop. | Note | %± |
|---|---|---|---|
| 1790 | 8,106 | | — |
| 1800 | 9,929 | | 22.5% |
| 1810 | 11,007 | | 10.9% |
| 1820 | 13,411 | | 21.8% |
| 1830 | 17,888 | | 33.4% |
| 1840 | 15,799 | | −11.7% |
| 1850 | 7,772 | | −50.8% |
| 1860 | 9,237 | | 18.8% |
| 1870 | 9,777 | | 5.8% |
| 1880 | 12,809 | | 31.0% |
| 1890 | 14,939 | | 16.6% |
| 1900 | 17,699 | | 18.5% |
| 1910 | 21,408 | | 21.0% |
| 1920 | 23,297 | | 8.8% |
| 1930 | 29,410 | | 26.2% |
| 1940 | 38,615 | | 31.3% |
| 1950 | 45,518 | | 17.9% |
| 1960 | 52,701 | | 15.8% |
| 1970 | 60,364 | | 14.5% |
| 1980 | 72,504 | | 20.1% |
| 1990 | 75,744 | | 4.5% |
| 2000 | 89,148 | | 17.7% |
| 2010 | 90,912 | | 2.0% |
| 2020 | 87,570 | | −3.7% |
| 2025 (est.) | 88,655 | ▲ | 1.2% |
U.S. Decennial Census; 1790–1960 1900–1990; 1990–2000 2010 2020

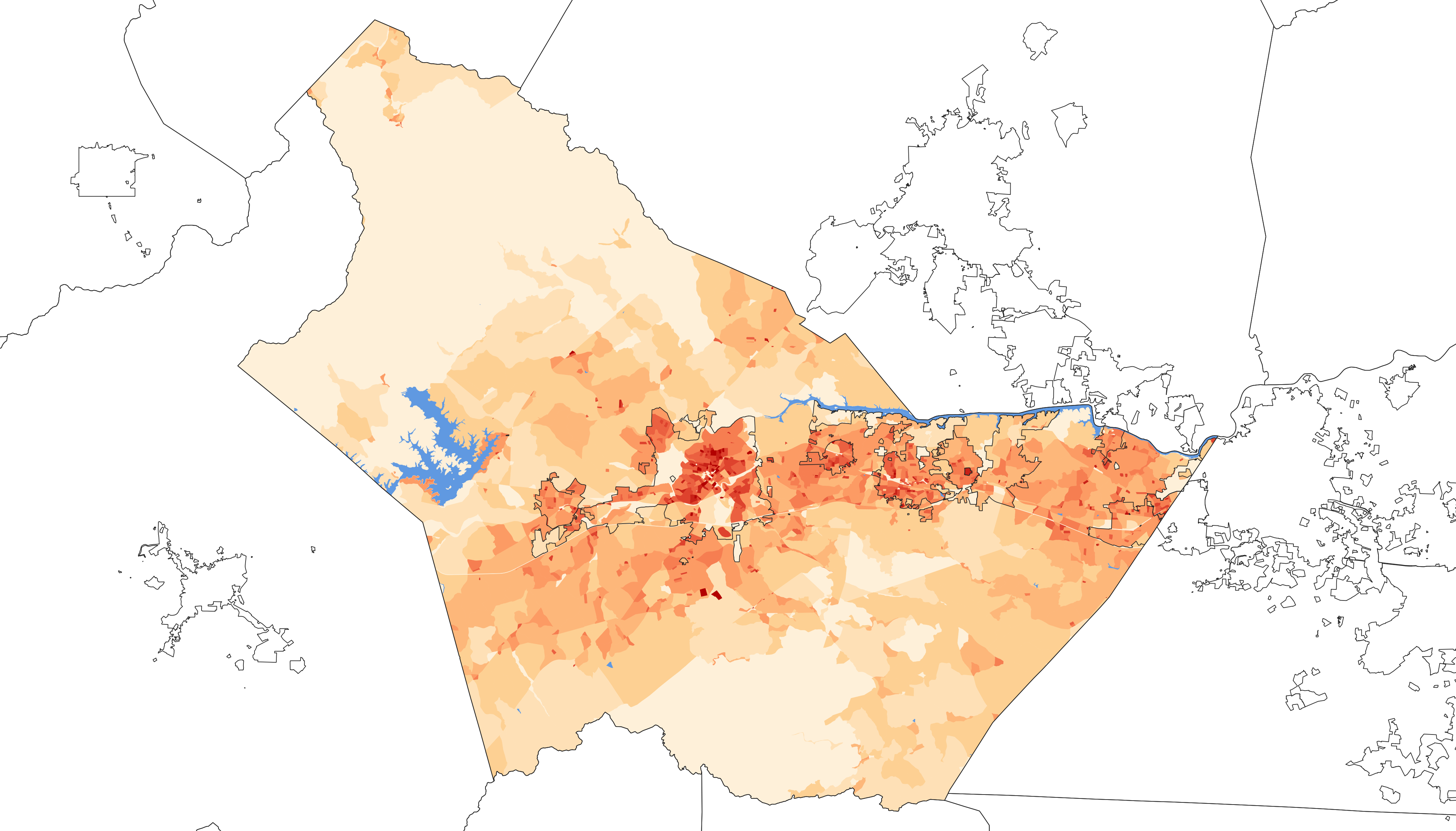
2020 population density of Burke County NC by census block

=== Racial and ethnic composition ===
Burke County, North Carolina – Racial and ethnic composition Note: the US Census treats Hispanic/Latino as an ethnic category. This table excludes Latinos from the racial categories and assigns them to a separate category. Hispanics/Latinos may be of any race.
| Race / Ethnicity (NH = Non-Hispanic) | Pop 1980 | Pop 1990 | Pop 2000 | Pop 2010 | Pop 2020 | % 1980 | % 1990 | % 2000 | % 2010 | % 2020 |
|---|---|---|---|---|---|---|---|---|---|---|
| White alone (NH) | 66,658 | 69,306 | 75,727 | 75,472 | 68,664 | 91.94% | 91.50% | 84.95% | 83.02% | 78.41% |
| Black or African American alone (NH) | 5,171 | 5,159 | 5,953 | 5,953 | 4,762 | 7.13% | 6.81% | 6.68% | 6.55% | 5.44% |
| Native American or Alaska Native alone (NH) | 95 | 131 | 213 | 207 | 238 | 0.13% | 0.17% | 0.24% | 0.23% | 0.27% |
| Asian alone (NH) | 145 | 790 | 3,093 | 3,163 | 3,150 | 0.20% | 1.04% | 3.47% | 3.48% | 3.60% |
| Native Hawaiian or Pacific Islander alone (NH) | x | x | 80 | 162 | 64 | x | x | 0.09% | 0.18% | 0.07% |
| Other race alone (NH) | 78 | 14 | 89 | 87 | 240 | 0.11% | 0.02% | 0.10% | 0.10% | 0.27% |
| Mixed race or Multiracial (NH) | x | x | 813 | 1,234 | 3,268 | x | x | 0.91% | 1.36% | 3.73% |
| Hispanic or Latino (any race) | 357 | 344 | 3,180 | 4,634 | 7,184 | 0.49% | 0.45% | 3.57% | 5.10% | 8.20% |
| Total | 72,504 | 75,744 | 89,148 | 90,912 | 87,570 | 100.00% | 100.00% | 100.00% | 100.00% | 100.00% |

=== 2020 census ===
As of the 2020 census, 87,570 people and 25,391 families resided in the county. The median age was 44.2 years, 20.0% of residents were under the age of 18, 20.9% of residents were 65 years of age or older, for every 100 females there were 98.7 males, and for every 100 females age 18 and over there were 97.3 males age 18 and over.

There were 35,140 households in the county, of which 27.2% had children under the age of 18 living in them. Of all households, 47.4% were married-couple households, 18.4% were households with a male householder and no spouse or partner present, and 27.5% were households with a female householder and no spouse or partner present. About 28.5% of all households were made up of individuals and 13.9% had someone living alone who was 65 years of age or older.

There were 39,525 housing units, of which 11.1% were vacant. Among occupied housing units, 71.7% were owner-occupied and 28.3% were renter-occupied. The homeowner vacancy rate was 1.3% and the rental vacancy rate was 8.0%.

The racial makeup of the county was 79.6% White, 5.5% Black or African American, 1.5% American Indian and Alaska Native, 3.6% Asian, 0.1% Native Hawaiian and Pacific Islander, 4.4% from some other race, and 5.3% from two or more races. Hispanic or Latino residents of any race comprised 8.2% of the population.

54.1% of residents lived in urban areas, while 45.9% lived in rural areas.

=== 2000 census ===
At the 2000 census, 89,148 people, 34,528 households, and 24,342 families were residing in the county. The population density was 176 people per square mile (68 people/km^{2}). The 37,427 housing units had an average density of 74 units per square mile (29 units/km^{2}). The racial makeup of the county was 86.01% White, 6.71% African American, 0.30% Native American, 3.48% Asian, 0.21% Pacific Islander, 2.17% from other races, and 1.11% from two or more races. About 3.57% of the population were Hispanics or Latinos of any race.

Of the 34,528 households, 31.0% had children under 18 living with them, 54.9% were married couples living together, 11.0% had a female householder with no husband present, and 29.5% were not families. About 25.5% of all households were made up of individuals, and 9.9% had someone living alone who was 65 or older. The average household size was 2.48, and the average family size was 2.94.

In the county, the age distribution was 24.0% under 18, 8.90% from 18 to 24, 29.6% from 25 to 44, 24.0% from 45 to 64, and 13.4% who were 65 or older. The median age was 37 years. For every 100 females, there were 100.00 males. For every 100 females 18 and over, there were 97.70 males.

The median income for a household in the county was $35,629, and for a family was $42,114. Males had a median income of $27,591 versus $21,993 for females. The per capita income for the county was $17,397. About 8.00% of families and 10.70% of the population were below the poverty line, including 13.6% of those under 18 and 12.5% of those 65 or over.

== Government and politics ==
Burke County leans heavily Republican in presidential elections. The last Democrat to carry the county was Jimmy Carter in 1976. Lyndon Johnson, who won the county as a Democrat in 1964, was the only other one to do so since World War II. However, as late as the 1990s, Democratic presidential candidates have managed to garner 40% of the county's vote. As was typical for all of the South outside the Appalachian highlands and a few stronghold Republican counties, Burke County was mostly solidly Democratic before World War II.

In the North Carolina Senate, Burke County lies within the 46th Senate district, which also covers Cleveland County and is represented by Republican Warren Daniel. In the North Carolina House of Representatives, the northern two-thirds of Burke County comprises the 86th District represented by Republican Hugh Blackwell. The southern third lies within the 112th district, which also covers Rutherford County and is represented by Republican David Rogers.

Burke County is a member of the regional Western Piedmont Council of Governments. The county is governed by a five-member Board of Commissioners, elected to serve four-year terms.

United States presidential election results for Burke County, North Carolina
| Year | Republican | | Democratic | | Third party(ies) | |
| Year | No. | % | No. | % | No. | % |
|---|---|---|---|---|---|---|
| 1912 | 48 | 1.78% | 1,365 | 50.54% | 1,288 | 47.69% |
| 1916 | 1,474 | 47.63% | 1,621 | 52.37% | 0 | 0.00% |
| 1920 | 3,592 | 52.41% | 3,262 | 47.59% | 0 | 0.00% |
| 1924 | 3,190 | 43.54% | 4,137 | 56.46% | 0 | 0.00% |
| 1928 | 5,108 | 63.94% | 2,881 | 36.06% | 0 | 0.00% |
| 1932 | 4,823 | 44.92% | 5,866 | 54.64% | 47 | 0.44% |
| 1936 | 5,506 | 42.48% | 7,454 | 57.52% | 0 | 0.00% |
| 1940 | 4,889 | 40.30% | 7,242 | 59.70% | 0 | 0.00% |
| 1944 | 5,855 | 46.28% | 6,795 | 53.72% | 0 | 0.00% |
| 1948 | 6,374 | 47.26% | 6,226 | 46.16% | 888 | 6.58% |
| 1952 | 11,113 | 58.97% | 7,732 | 41.03% | 0 | 0.00% |
| 1956 | 11,823 | 59.65% | 7,999 | 40.35% | 0 | 0.00% |
| 1960 | 12,925 | 56.34% | 10,015 | 43.66% | 0 | 0.00% |
| 1964 | 10,081 | 44.03% | 12,815 | 55.97% | 0 | 0.00% |
| 1968 | 11,068 | 48.84% | 5,704 | 25.17% | 5,892 | 26.00% |
| 1972 | 14,447 | 68.96% | 6,197 | 29.58% | 306 | 1.46% |
| 1976 | 10,070 | 41.22% | 14,254 | 58.34% | 107 | 0.44% |
| 1980 | 12,956 | 50.97% | 11,680 | 45.95% | 781 | 3.07% |
| 1984 | 18,766 | 64.32% | 10,353 | 35.48% | 59 | 0.20% |
| 1988 | 15,933 | 59.41% | 10,848 | 40.45% | 38 | 0.14% |
| 1992 | 13,397 | 44.48% | 12,565 | 41.71% | 4,160 | 13.81% |
| 1996 | 13,853 | 48.97% | 11,678 | 41.28% | 2,760 | 9.76% |
| 2000 | 18,466 | 60.23% | 11,924 | 38.89% | 268 | 0.87% |
| 2004 | 18,922 | 61.51% | 11,728 | 38.12% | 112 | 0.36% |
| 2008 | 22,102 | 59.03% | 14,901 | 39.80% | 440 | 1.18% |
| 2012 | 22,267 | 60.93% | 13,701 | 37.49% | 576 | 1.58% |
| 2016 | 26,238 | 67.42% | 11,251 | 28.91% | 1,431 | 3.68% |
| 2020 | 31,019 | 69.55% | 13,118 | 29.41% | 465 | 1.04% |
| 2024 | 32,130 | 70.08% | 13,272 | 28.95% | 445 | 0.97% |

== Communities ==
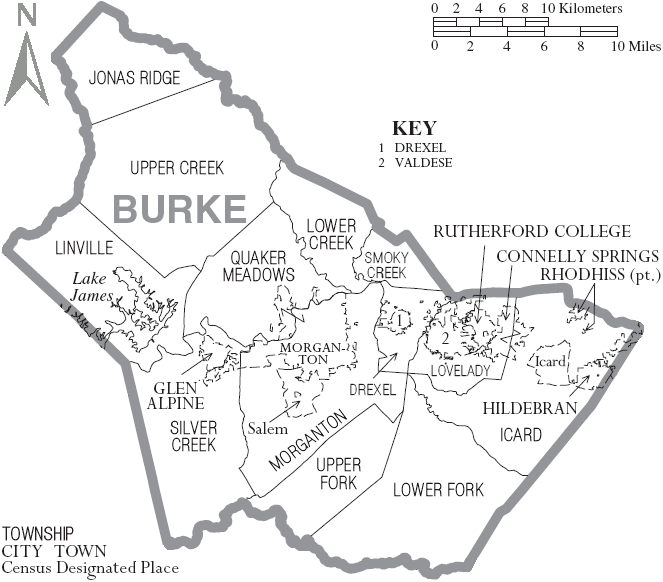
Map of Burke County with municipal and township labels

=== City ===
- Morganton (county seat and largest community)

=== Towns ===
- Connelly Springs
- Drexel
- Glen Alpine
- Hildebran
- Long View
- Rhodhiss
- Rutherford College
- Valdese

=== Townships ===
- Drexel
- Icard
- Jonas Ridge
- Linville
- Lovelady
- Lower Creek
- Lower Fork
- Quaker Meadows
- Silver Creek
- Smoky Creek
- Upper Creek
- Upper Fork
- Hildebran
- Connelly Springs
- Rutherford College
- Valdese

=== Census-designated places ===
- Icard
- Salem

=== Unincorporated communities ===
- Amherst
- Enola
- Jonas Ridge
- Linville Falls
- Petersburg
- Pleasant Grove
- Sunnyside
- Chesterfield

== Education ==
All of Burke County is in the Burke County Public Schools.

== In popular culture ==
Although never explicitly mentioned by name in the novel, the hideout of Robur-the villain in Jules Verne's Master of the World-is thought to be Table Rock Mountain in Burke County.

The outdoor drama From This Day Forward has been performed annually in Burke County since 1968. It tells the story of the founding of the town of Valdese.

Many scenes from the 1992 film Last of the Mohicans were filmed in Burke County. A full-scale fort was built next to the Linville boat access on Lake James for the filming. The fort was later destroyed and the land replanted with trees. Many of the extras who played settlers, British soldiers, and Native Americans were locals from Burke and surrounding counties.

The final scene from The Hunt for Red October had the backdrop filmed on Lake James, while the actors stayed in Hollywood.

In 2011, scenes for the Lionsgate adaptation of The Hunger Games were filmed near Hildebran, North Carolina, at the Henry River Mill Village.

== See also ==
- Burke County Regiment of the Salisbury District Brigade
- List of counties in North Carolina
- National Register of Historic Places listings in Burke County, North Carolina
