= Catawba County, North Carolina =

County in North Carolina, United States

- County
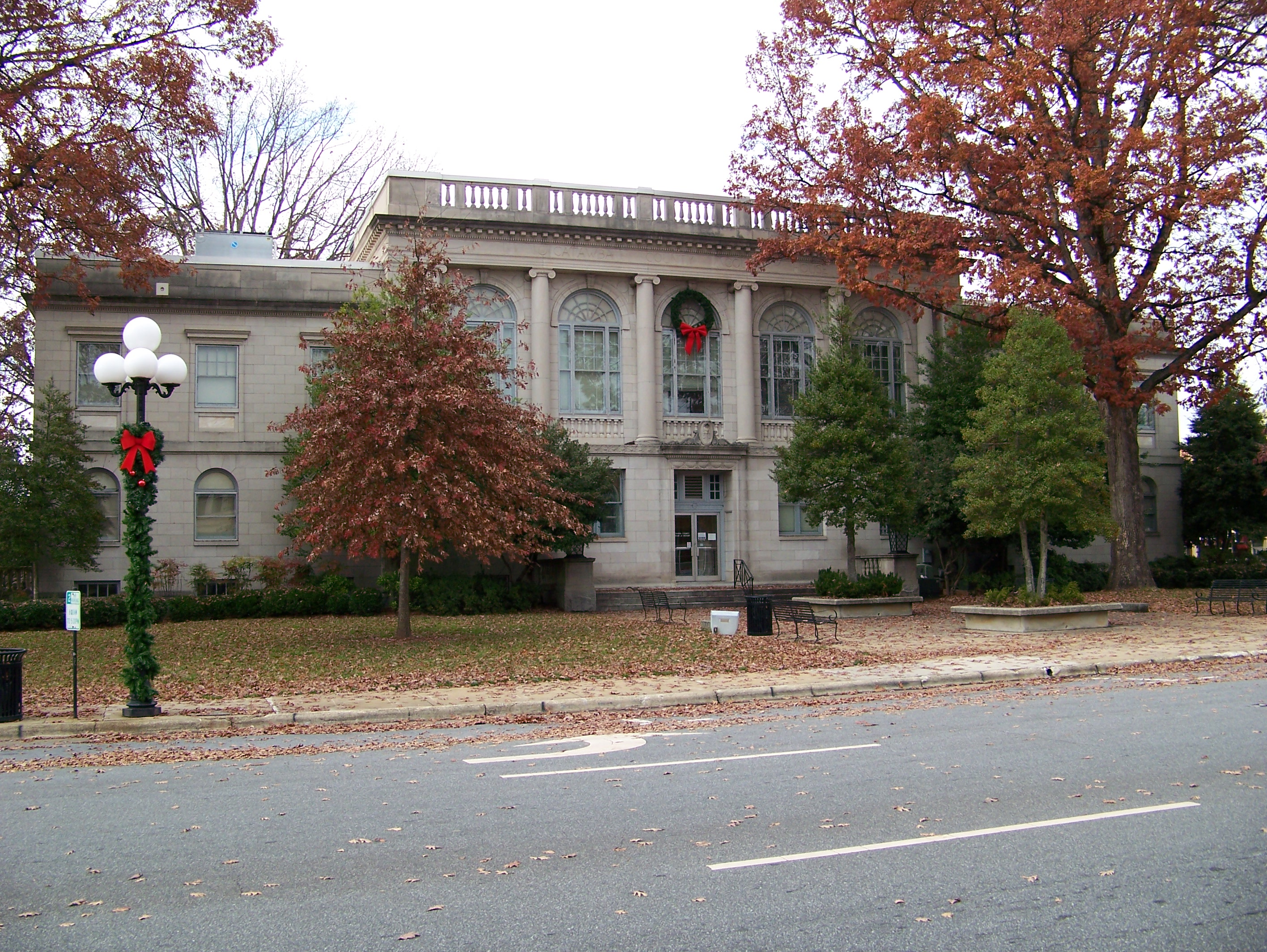
- Old Catawba County Courthouse

- Flag Seal Logo
- Motto: "Making. Living. Better."
- Location within the U.S. state of North Carolina
- Interactive map of Catawba County, North Carolina
- Coordinates: 35.66°N 81.21°W
- Country: United States
- State: North Carolina
- Founded: 1842
- Named for: Catawba Tribe
- Seat: Newton
- Largest community: Hickory

Area
  - Total: 416.02 sq mi (1,077.5 km^{2})
  - Land: 401.37 sq mi (1,039.5 km^{2})
  - Water: 14.65 sq mi (37.9 km^{2}) 3.52%

Population (2020)
  - Total: 160,610
  - Estimate (2025): 170,172 ▲
  - Density: 400.15/sq mi (154.50/km^{2})
- Time zone: UTC−5 (Eastern)
  - Summer (DST): UTC−4 (EDT)
- Congressional district: 10th
- Website: www.catawbacountync.gov

Catawba County (/kəˈtɔːbə/ kuh-TAW-buh) is a county in the U.S. state of North Carolina. As of the 2020 census, the population was 160,610. Its county seat is Newton, and its largest community is Hickory.

The county is part of the Hickory-Lenoir-Morganton, NC Metropolitan Statistical Area.

== History ==
Catawba County, formed in 1842 from Lincoln County, was named after the Catawba River. The word "catawba" is rooted in the Choctaw sound kat'a pa, loosely translated as "to divide or separate, to break." However, scholars are fairly certain that this word was imposed from outside. The Native Americans who once inhabited the region known as the Catawba people, were considered one of the most powerful Southeastern Siouan-speaking tribes in the Carolina Piedmont. They now live along the border of North Carolina, near the city of Rock Hill, South Carolina. Scots-Irish and German colonial immigrants first settled in the Catawba River valley in the mid-18th century. An official history of the Scots-Irish and German settlement was documented in 1954, by Charles J. Preslar Jr, and more recently by a series of three books by Gary Freeze, called The Catawbans.

== Geography ==
According to the U.S. Census Bureau, the county has a total area of 416.02 square miles (1,077.5 km^{2}), of which 401.37 square miles (1,039.5 km^{2}) is land and 14.65 square miles (37.9 km^{2}) (3.52%) is water.

=== State and local protected areas/sites ===
- Houck's Chapel
- Mountain Creek Park
- Murray's Mill Historic Site
- Old Hickory Tavern Birthplace of Hickory
- Old Piedmont Wagon

=== Major water bodies ===
- Balls Creek
- Betts Creek
- Catawba River
- Clark Creek
- Henry Fork
- Jacob Fork
- Lake Hickory
- Lake Norman
- Lookout Shoals Lake
- Lyle Creek
- McLin Creek
- Muddy Creek
- Pinch Gut Creek
- Pott Creek
- Snow Creek
- South Fork Catawba River

=== Adjacent counties ===
- Alexander County – north
- Iredell County – east
- Lincoln County – south
- Caldwell County – northwest
- Burke County – west

== Demographics ==
Historical population
Census	Pop.	Note	%±
1850	8,862		—
1860	10,729		21.1%
1870	10,984		2.4%
1880	14,946		36.1%
1890	18,689		25.0%
1900	22,133		18.4%
1910	27,918		26.1%
1920	33,839		21.2%
1930	43,991		30.0%
1940	54,653		24.2%
1950	61,794		13.1%
1960	73,191		18.4%
1970	90,873		24.2%
1980	105,208		15.8%
1990	118,412		12.6%
2000	141,685		19.7%
2010	154,358		8.9%
2020	160,610		4.1%
2025 (est.)	170,172	▲	6.0%
U.S. Decennial Census; 1790–1960 1900–1990; 1990–2000 2010 2020

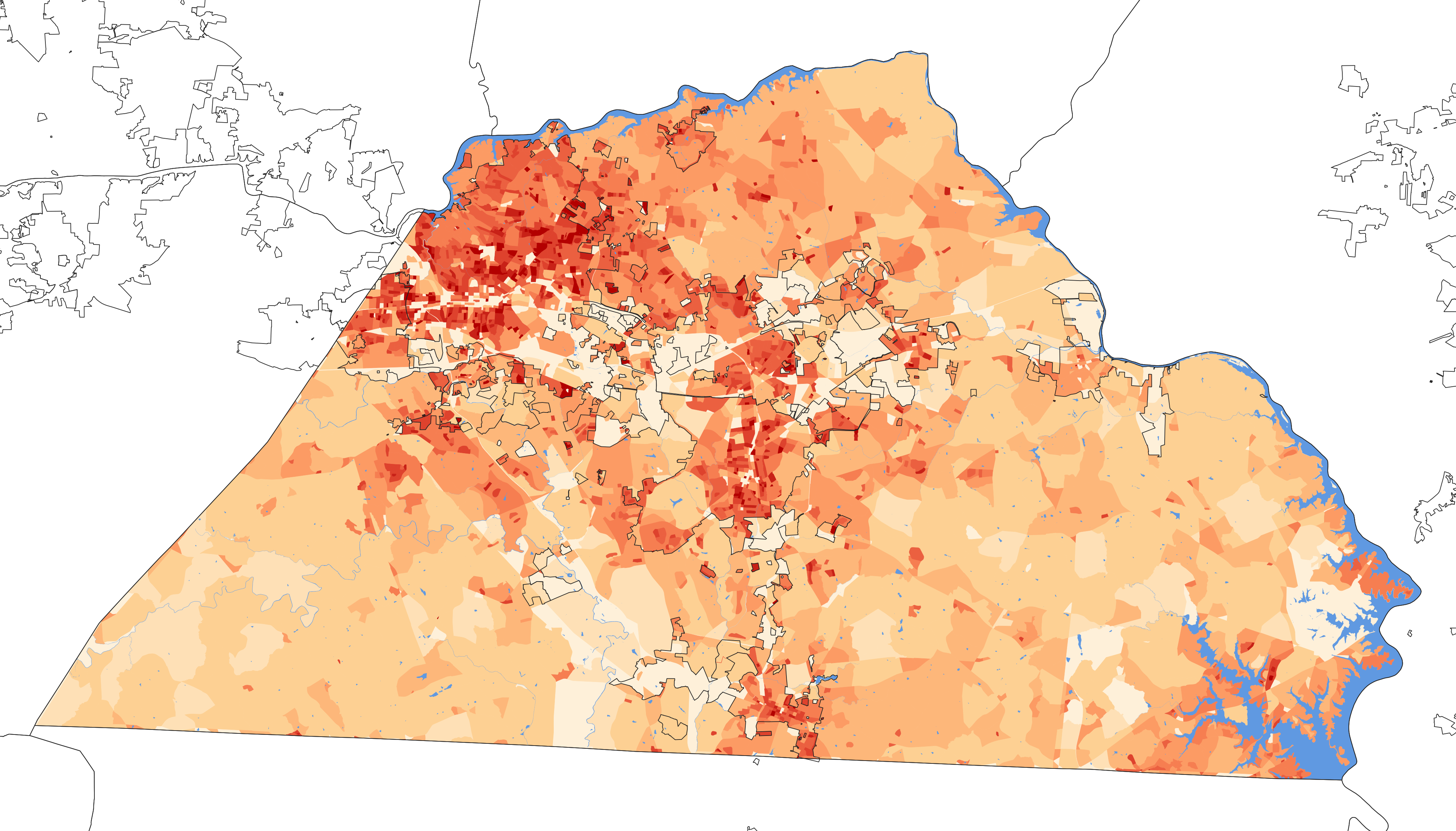
2020 population density of Catawba County NC by census block

=== 2020 census ===
Catawba County, North Carolina – Racial and ethnic composition Note: the US Census treats Hispanic/Latino as an ethnic category. This table excludes Latinos from the racial categories and assigns them to a separate category. Hispanics/Latinos may be of any race.
Race / Ethnicity (NH = Non-Hispanic)	Pop 1980	Pop 1990	Pop 2000	Pop 2010	Pop 2020	% 1980	% 1990	% 2000	% 2010	% 2020
White alone (NH)	94,532	105,795	116,326	120,388	116,120	89.85%	89.34%	82.10%	77.99%	72.30%
Black or African American alone (NH)	9,658	10,649	11,751	12,857	12,628	9.18%	8.99%	8.29%	8.33%	7.86%
Native American or Alaska Native alone (NH)	106	224	302	342	379	0.10%	0.19%	0.21%	0.22%	0.24%
Asian alone (NH)	271	808	4,100	5,311	6,937	0.26%	0.68%	2.89%	3.44%	4.32%
Native Hawaiian or Pacific Islander alone (NH)	x	x	37	34	78	x	x	0.03%	0.02%	0.05%
Other race alone (NH)	63	15	110	200	539	0.06%	0.01%	0.08%	0.13%	0.34%
Mixed race or Multiracial (NH)	x	x	1,173	2,194	6,552	x	x	0.83%	1.42%	4.08%
Hispanic or Latino (any race)	578	921	7,886	13,032	17,377	0.55%	0.78%	5.57%	8.44%	10.82%
Total	105,208	118,412	141,685	154,358	160,610	100.00%	100.00%	100.00%	100.00%	100.00%

As of the 2020 census, there were 160,610 people, 64,471 households, and 41,861 families residing in the county. The median age was 42.7 years; 21.2% of residents were under the age of 18 and 19.0% were 65 years of age or older. For every 100 females there were 95.9 males, and for every 100 females age 18 and over there were 93.7 males.

Of the 64,471 households in the county, 28.7% had children under the age of 18 living in them, 47.6% were married-couple households, 18.2% were households with a male householder and no spouse or partner present, and 27.0% were households with a female householder and no spouse or partner present. About 27.9% of all households were made up of individuals and 12.4% had someone living alone who was 65 years of age or older.

There were 70,744 housing units, of which 8.9% were vacant. Among occupied housing units, 69.2% were owner-occupied and 30.8% were renter-occupied. The homeowner vacancy rate was 1.5% and the rental vacancy rate was 7.5%.

64.8% of residents lived in urban areas, while 35.2% lived in rural areas.

The racial makeup of the county was 74.1% White, 8.0% Black or African American, 0.6% American Indian and Alaska Native, 4.4% Asian, 0.1% Native Hawaiian and Pacific Islander, 5.9% from some other race, and 7.0% from two or more races. Hispanic or Latino residents of any race comprised 10.8% of the population.

=== 2010 census ===
At the 2010 census, there were 154,358 people, 55,533 households, and 39,095 families residing in the county. The population density was 354 people per square mile (137 people/km^{2}). There were 59,919 housing units at an average density of 150 units per square mile (58 units/km^{2}). The racial makeup of the county was 87.1% White, 8.5% Black or African American, 0.3% Native American, 3.1% Asian, 0.05% Pacific Islander, and 1.14% from two or more races, 9.4% of the population were Hispanic or Latino of any race.

There were 55,533 households, out of which 31.50% had children under the age of 18 living with them, 55.10% were married couples living together, 10.90% had a female householder with no husband present, and 29.60% were non-families. 24.60% of all households were made up of individuals, and 9.10% had someone living alone who was 65 years of age or older. The average household size was 2.51 and the average family size was 2.98.

In the county, the population was spread out, with 24.30% under the age of 18, 8.80% from 18 to 24, 31.10% from 25 to 44, 23.50% from 45 to 64, and 12.30% who were 65 years of age or older. The median age was 36 years. For every 100 females there were 97.30 males. For every 100 females age 18 and over, there were 94.70 males.

The median income for a household in the county was $43,536, and the median income for a family was $47,474. Males had a median income of $30,822 versus $23,352 for females. The per capita income for the county was $20,358. About 6.50% of families and 9.10% of the population were below the poverty line, including 12.50% of those under age 18 and 9.70% of those age 65 or over.

== Politics ==
The county has been represented primarily by Republicans since World War II: no Democratic presidential candidate has won Catawba County since Franklin D. Roosevelt in 1944. Jimmy Carter is the last Democrat to manage even 40 percent of the county's vote.

United States presidential election results for Catawba County, North Carolina
Year	Republican		Democratic		Third party(ies)	
Year	No.	%	No.	%	No.	%
1880	624	24.89%	1,883	75.11%	0	0.00%
1884	662	22.30%	2,307	77.70%	0	0.00%
1888	765	23.85%	2,349	73.22%	94	2.93%
1892	705	20.85%	1,711	50.59%	966	28.56%
1896	1,004	27.27%	2,649	71.94%	29	0.79%
1900	1,522	46.23%	1,612	48.97%	158	4.80%
1904	1,309	42.47%	1,497	48.57%	276	8.96%
1908	2,010	51.42%	1,864	47.68%	35	0.90%
1912	203	4.85%	2,110	50.38%	1,875	44.77%
1916	2,624	50.39%	2,569	49.34%	14	0.27%
1920	5,935	52.34%	5,404	47.66%	0	0.00%
1924	5,998	50.32%	5,754	48.28%	167	1.40%
1928	7,556	60.58%	4,916	39.42%	0	0.00%
1932	5,817	40.56%	8,446	58.90%	77	0.54%
1936	6,387	36.70%	11,017	63.30%	0	0.00%
1940	5,656	33.49%	11,233	66.51%	0	0.00%
1944	7,211	41.55%	10,146	58.45%	0	0.00%
1948	9,471	47.50%	8,844	44.36%	1,622	8.14%
1952	16,814	59.27%	11,554	40.73%	0	0.00%
1956	19,246	62.75%	11,424	37.25%	0	0.00%
1960	19,135	58.65%	13,491	41.35%	0	0.00%
1964	17,116	51.98%	15,814	48.02%	0	0.00%
1968	18,393	56.33%	6,974	21.36%	7,285	22.31%
1972	24,106	74.46%	7,744	23.92%	525	1.62%
1976	18,696	52.36%	16,862	47.22%	150	0.42%
1980	22,873	60.39%	13,873	36.63%	1,132	2.99%
1984	31,476	72.78%	11,700	27.05%	74	0.17%
1988	28,872	69.01%	12,922	30.89%	44	0.11%
1992	25,466	51.54%	16,334	33.06%	7,609	15.40%
1996	26,898	58.03%	15,601	33.66%	3,855	8.32%
2000	34,244	67.36%	16,246	31.95%	351	0.69%
2004	39,602	67.48%	18,858	32.13%	228	0.39%
2008	42,993	61.90%	25,656	36.94%	802	1.15%
2012	44,538	63.99%	24,069	34.58%	994	1.43%
2016	48,324	66.79%	21,216	29.32%	2,811	3.89%
2020	56,588	67.83%	25,689	30.79%	1,148	1.38%
2024	59,577	68.39%	26,569	30.50%	963	1.11%

== Law and government ==
Catawba County is governed by a five-member county board of commissioners, a seven-member school board, and five supervisors on the water and soil conservation district. The county's judiciary is represented by two superior court judges and six district court judges. Other offices include the district attorney, county clerk, sheriff, and register of deeds.

=== County Offices ===
==== Board of Commissioners ====
Office	Holder	Party	Term expires
County Commissioner (chair)	Randy Isenhower	Republican	2026
County Commissioner (vice-chair)	Austin Allran	Republican	2028
County Commissioner	Robert Abernethy, Jr.	Republican	2026
County Commissioner	Barbara Beatty	Republican	2028
County Commissioner	Cole Setzer	Republican	2026

=== North Carolina General Assembly ===
==== North Carolina Senate ====
District	Representative	Party	Term expires
45	Mark Hollo	Republican	2027

==== North Carolina House of Representatives ====
District	Representative	Party	Term expires
89	Mitchell S. Setzer	Republican	2027
96	Jay Adams	Republican	2027

=== Federal offices ===
==== Senate ====
Senator	Party	Term expires
Ted Budd	Republican	2029
Thom Tillis	Republican	2027

==== House of Representatives ====
District	Representative	Party	Term expires
10th	Pat Harrigan	Republican	2027

== Transportation ==
=== Major highways ===
- I-40
- US 70
- US 321
- US 321 Bus.
- NC 10
- NC 16
- NC 16 Bus. (Lowesville–Denver business route)
- NC 16 Bus. (Newton–Conover business route)
- NC 16 Truck (truck route)
- NC 18
- NC 127
- NC 150

=== Major infrastructure ===
- Hickory Regional Airport (partially in Burke County)

=== Rail and mass transit ===
With approximately twenty freight trains a day, Catawba County is a freight railroad transportation center. This is largely due to the areas strong manufacturing based economy, and its placement along the Norfolk Southern Railway line. The Caldwell County Railroad also serves the county and interchanges with Norfolk Southern in Hickory.

Conover has been designated as the Catawba County passenger rail stop for the Western North Carolina Railroad planned to run from Salisbury, to Asheville.

The Greenway Public Transportation bus service serves the cities of Conover, Hickory, and Newton.

== Economy ==
Catawba County is part of the "North Carolina Data Center Corridor" in western North Carolina. The town of Maiden is home to the Apple iCloud data center and is the largest privately owned solar farm in the United States (operated by Apple). As of 2017, the Catawba County Economic Development Corporation controls a 55-acre business park in Conover designed for data centers and office use. CommScope, Inc., and Corning Corp., manufacturers of fiber optic cabling, became the region's largest employers in the late 1990s. The city of Hickory is home to Lenoir–Rhyne University, the Hickory Motor Speedway, and the minor league baseball team the Hickory Crawdads. The town of Conover is home to the Greater Hickory Classic at Rock Barn.

== Education ==
The school districts are as follows:

- Most of the county is in the Catawba County Schools school district.
- Most of Newton and Conover, and some unincoprorated areas, are in the Newton-Conover City Schools school district.
- Most of Hickory, the Catawba County portion of Long View, portions of Brookford, and some unincoroporated areas are in the Hickory City School System school district.

=== Higher education ===
- Lenoir–Rhyne University
- Catawba Valley Community College
- Appalachian State University, Hickory campus
- NC Center for Engineering Technologies

=== Libraries ===
- The Catawba County Library System serves the residents of Catawba County. The library system operates seven libraries throughout the county.
- The Hickory Public Library System serves the residents of Hickory. The library system operates two libraries: The Patrick Beaver Memorial Library and the Ridgeview Library.

== Points of Interest ==
=== Museums and historical sites ===
- Catawba County Firefighters Museum
- Catawba County Museum of History
- Hickory Aviation Museum
- Hickory Museum of Art
- Catawba Science Center
- Murrays Mill
- Bunker Hill Covered Bridge
- Piedmont Wagon Company

=== Sports and entertainment ===
- Hickory Crawdads
- Hickory Motor Speedway

=== Music and performing arts ===
- Newton-Conover Auditorium
- The Green-Room Theatre
- Western Piedmont Symphony
- Hickory Community Theatre

=== Other attractions ===
- Valley Hills Mall
- Lake Norman
- Lake Hickory
- Lake Lookout

== Communities ==
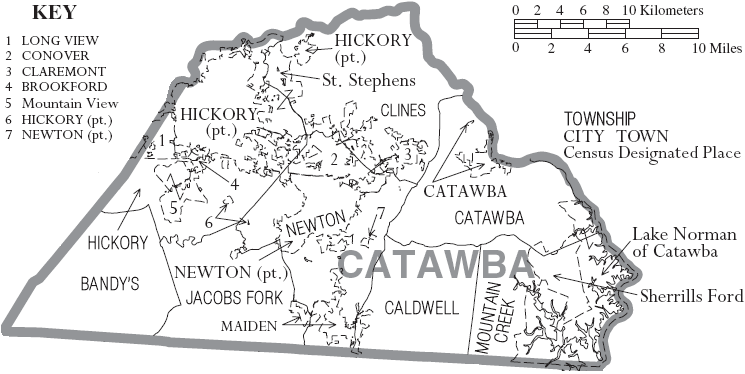
Map of Catawba County with municipal and township labels

=== Cities ===
- Claremont
- Conover
- Hickory (largest community)
- Newton (county seat)

=== Towns ===
- Brookford
- Catawba
- Long View
- Maiden

=== Census-designated places ===
- Lake Norman of Catawba
- Mountain View
- St. Stephens

=== Unincorporated communities ===
- Banoak
- Blackburn
- Chronicle
- Drums Crossroads
- Long Island
- Monbo
- Olivers Crossroads
- Propst Crossroads
- Sherrills Ford
- Terrell

=== Townships ===
- Bandy's
- Caldwell
- Catawba
- Clines
- Hickory
- Jacobs Fork
- Mountain Creek
- Newton

== See also ==
- List of counties in North Carolina
- National Register of Historic Places listings in Catawba County, North Carolina
