= Mill Village Historic District =

Mill Village Historic District may refer to:

- Mill Village Historic District (Williamstown, Massachusetts), listed on the NRHP in Massachusetts
- Mill Village Historic District (Tupelo, Mississippi), listed on the NRHP in Mississippi
- Mill Village Historic District (Waterbury, Vermont), listed on the NRHP in Vermont

== Other districts by state ==
- Mandeville Mills and Mill Village Historic District, Carrollton, GA, listed on the NRHP in Georgia
- ATCO-Goodyear Mill and Mill Village Historic District, Cartersville, GA, listed on the NRHP in Georgia
- Covington Mills and Mill Village Historic District, Covington, GA, listed on the NRHP in Georgia
- Stark Mill and Mill Village Historic District, Hogansville, GA, listed on the NRHP in Georgia
- Newnan Cotton Mill and Mill Village Historic District, Newnan, GA, listed on the NRHP in Georgia
- Jerusalem Mill Village, Jerusalem, MD, listed on the NRHP in Maryland
- Howland Mill Village Historic District, New Bedford, MA, listed on the NRHP in Massachusetts
- Stonewall Mill Village Historic District, Stonewall, MS, listed on the NRHP in Mississippi
- Alamance Mill Village Historic District, Alamance, NC, listed on the NRHP in North Carolina
- Bellemont Mill Village Historic District, Bellemont, NC, listed on the NRHP in North Carolina
- Pearl Mill Village Historic District, Durham, NC, listed on the NRHP in North Carolina
- Alexander Manufacturing Company Mill Village Historic District, Forest City, NC, listed on the NRHP in North Carolina
- Glencoe Mill Village Historic District, Glencoe, NC, listed on the NRHP in North Carolina
- Oakdale Cotton Mill Village, Jamestown, NC, listed on the NRHP in North Carolina
- Erlanger Mill Village Historic District, Lexington, NC, listed on the NRHP in North Carolina
- Glen Royall Mill Village Historic District, Wake Forest, NC, listed on the NRHP in North Carolina
- Fetter's Mill Village Historic District, Byrn Athyn Borough, PA, listed on the NRHP in Pennsylvania
- Berkeley Mill Village, Cumberland (Berkeley), RI, listed on the NRHP in Rhode Island
- Hamilton Mill Village Historic District, North Kingstown, RI, listed on the NRHP in Rhode Island
- Forestdale Mill Village Historic District, North Smithfield, RI, listed on the NRHP in Rhode Island
- Granby Mill Village Historic District, Columbia, SC, listed on the NRHP in South Carolina
- Vaucluse Mill Village Historic District, Vaucluse, SC, listed on the NRHP in South Carolina
- Woodside Cotton Mill Village Historic District, Woodside, SC, listed on the NRHP in South Carolina
