= Earle Sumner Draper =

American architect (1893–1994)

Earle Sumner Draper (October 19, 1893 – July 1, 1994) was an American town planner and a landscape designer, who is known for coining the term "urban sprawl". He worked under John Nolen.

A number of his works are listed on the National Register of Historic Places.

== Projects ==
His works include:

- Silvertown Historic Mill Village, Thomaston, GA
- Alexander Manufacturing Company Mill Village Historic District, roughly bounded by Victory & Wilson Drs., Allen & S. Broadway Sts. Forest City, NC (Draper, Earle Sumner), NRHP-listed
- Cliffside Public School, 1 N. Main St. Cliffside, NC (Draper, Earle Sumner), NRHP-listed
- Druid Hills Historic District, roughly bounded by Meadowbrook Terrace, US 25N, Ashwood Rd., and Ridgewood Ave. Hendersonville, NC (Draper, Earle Sumner), NRHP-listed
- Erlanger Mill Village Historic District, roughly bounded by Winston Rd., Short, 7th, Hames, Second Rainbow, Park Circle, & Olympia Sts. Lexington, NC (Draper, Earle Sumner), NRHP-listed
- Hayes Barton Historic District, roughly bounded by St. Mary's St., Glenwood Ave. and Williamson Dr. Raleigh, NC (Draper, Earle S.), NRHP-listed
- Laurelwood Cemetery, bordered by Laurel, W. White, Stewart, and W. Main Sts. Rock Hill, SC (Draper, Earle S.), NRHP-listed
- Lexington Residential Historic District, roughly bounded by State St., W. Fifth St., Martin St., Westside Dr., Southbound St., and W. Ninth Ave. Lexington, NC (Draper, Earle Sumner), NRHP-listed
- McAdenville Historic District, 100-413 Main St., Elm and Poplar Sts., and cross sts. from I-85 to S. Fork of Catawba River McAdenville, NC (Draper, Earle Sumner), NRHP-listed
- Pacolet Mill Office, 180 Montgomery Ave., Pacolet, SC (Draper, Earle S.), NRHP-listed
- Rutherfordton-Spindale Central High School, Rutherfordton, North Carolina, NRHP-listed
- Chicopee Mill and Village, Atlanta Hwy, Gainesville, GA (Draper, Earle S.), NRHP-listed

He also did work in

- MidTown (Columbus, Georgia)
- Sequoyah Hills, Tennessee
- Lake Lure, North Carolina - the 1926 Draper Plan for what is today the Lake Lure Town Center
