= Druid Hills Historic District =

Druid Hills Historic District may refer to:

- Druid Hills Historic District (Atlanta, Georgia), listed on the NRHP in Georgia
- Druid Hills Historic District (Hendersonville, North Carolina), listed on the NRHP in North Carolina

== See also ==
- Druid Hill Park Historic District, Baltimore, Maryland, NRHP-listed
