= Vladimir Korotkov =

Vladimir Korotkov may refer to:

- Vladimir Korotkov (footballer, born 1941), Soviet Russian football player and coach
- Vladimir Korotkov (tennis) (1948–2025), Soviet tennis player
- Vladimir Korotkov (sailor), Ukrainian yacht racer who won several competitions in the Soling class
- Vladimir Korotkov (politician) (1955-2025), Russian politician
