= Henry Fork =

Henry Fork may refer to:

- Henry Fork, Virginia, a census-designated place
- Henry Fork (West Virginia), a river
- Henry Fork (South Fork Catawba River tributary), a river in North Carolina

== See also ==
- Henrys Fork (disambiguation)
