= Henrys Fork =

Henrys Fork may refer to:

- Henrys Fork (Snake River tributary) in Idaho
- Henrys Fork (Green River tributary) in Utah and Wyoming, forming one arm of the Flaming Gorge Reservoir

== See also ==
- Henry Fork (disambiguation)
