= Chicopee, Georgia =

Former mill village in Georgia, U.S.

Coordinates: 34°15′12″N 83°50′37″W

Chicopee is a former mill village located approximately four miles south of downtown Gainesville, and is in Hall County, Georgia, United States.

Chicopee was designed in 1925 by Earle Sumner Draper for the Chicopee Manufacturing Corporation, a subsidiary of The Johnson and Johnson Company. It was his last mill town project and his most successful. It was the personal project of Robert Wood Johnson II. Construction started in 1927 and the village consisted of 217 homes, a company store, medical office, a school and churches, and the single-story mill. The homes had electricity and indoor plumbing with hot running water, making them unusual in northeastern Georgia at the time. The mill is the earliest example of a large single story textile plant built in the South.

The village is unincorporated and has a population of approximately 350. Originally the property was laid out for roughly 500 homes but only 217 homes were built in the first phase and the full plan was never completed. Chicopee GA as a whole is now a historic district. The Mill buildings are within the City of Gainesville while the Village is within unincorporated Hall County.

Chicopee is registered on the National Register of Historic Places.

Home in village

The 1950 U.S. census listed it as an unincorporated place with a population of 1,151.
