= Mill town =

Settlement that developed around one or more mills or factories

A mill town, also known as factory town or mill village, is a community that developed around one or more textile or other industrial mills, where the local economy centered on mill production and company owners typically provided housing, stores, schools, and other services to support workers and their families. Emerging prominently during the early 19th-century Industrial Revolution, mill towns harnessed water power from rivers to mechanize textile manufacturing, initially concentrating in New England before expanding southward, where they eclipsed northern production by the 1920s through lower labor costs and abundant resources. These towns featured a paternalistic social structure, with mill corporations exerting broad influence over daily life to ensure labor stability and productivity, fostering economic booms that built infrastructure but also vulnerability to market fluctuations, technological changes, and eventual deindustrialization.

== Europe ==
=== Italy ===
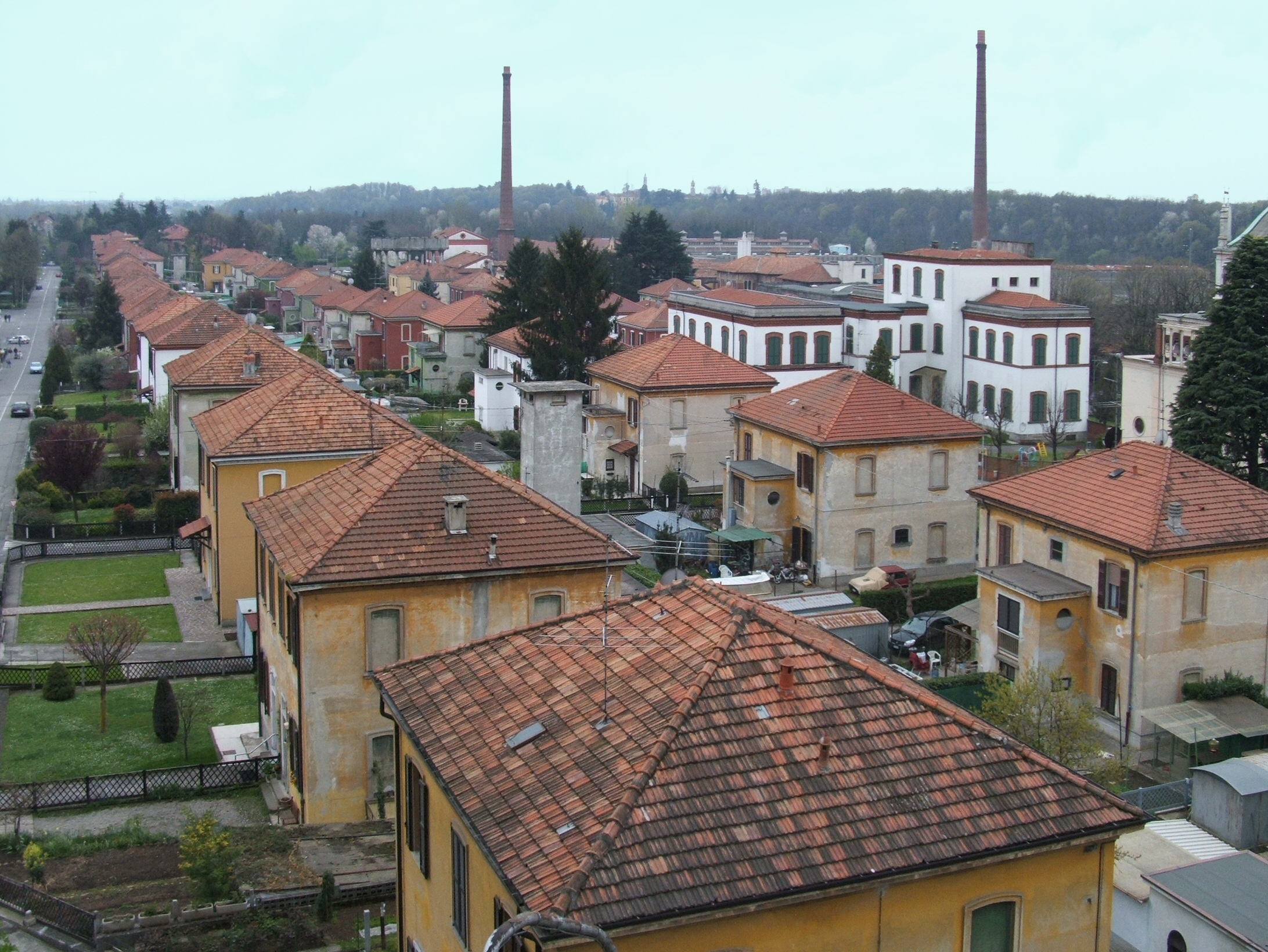
Crespi d'Adda (Italy)

- Crespi d'Adda, UNESCO World Heritage Site
- Nuovo quartiere operaio in Schio
- Villaggio Leumann a Collegno
- Villaggio Frua in Saronno
- Villaggio operaio della Filatura in Tollegno

=== Poland ===
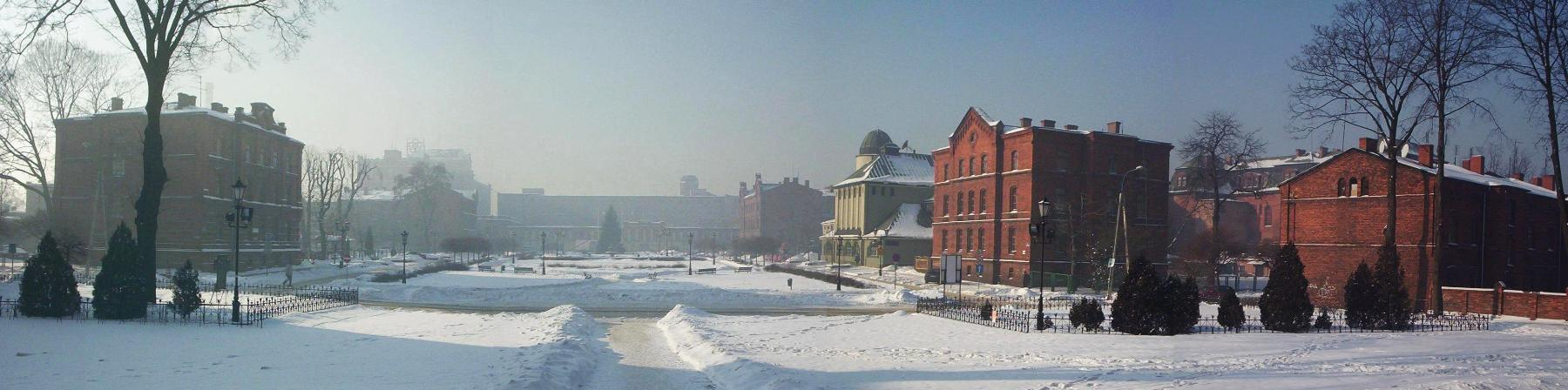
Żyrardów – winter panorama of main square

==== Żyrardów ====
The town grew out of a textile factory founded in 1833 by the sons of Feliks Lubienski, who owned the land where it was built. They brought in a specialist from France and his newly designed machines. He was French inventor, Philippe de Girard from Lourmarin. He became a director of the firm. The factory town developed during the 19th century into a significant textile mill town in Poland. In honour of Girard, 'Ruda Guzowska' as the original estate was called, was renamed Żyrardów, a toponym derived of the polonised spelling of Girard's name.

Most of Żyrardów's monuments are located in the manufacturing area which dates from the 19th and early 20th centuries. It is widely believed that Żyrardów's textile settlement is the only entire urban industrial complex from the 19th-century to be preserved in Europe.

=== Russian Empire ===
- Bogorodsk-Glukhovo factory
- Nikolskoye, Vladimir Governorate

=== United Kingdom ===
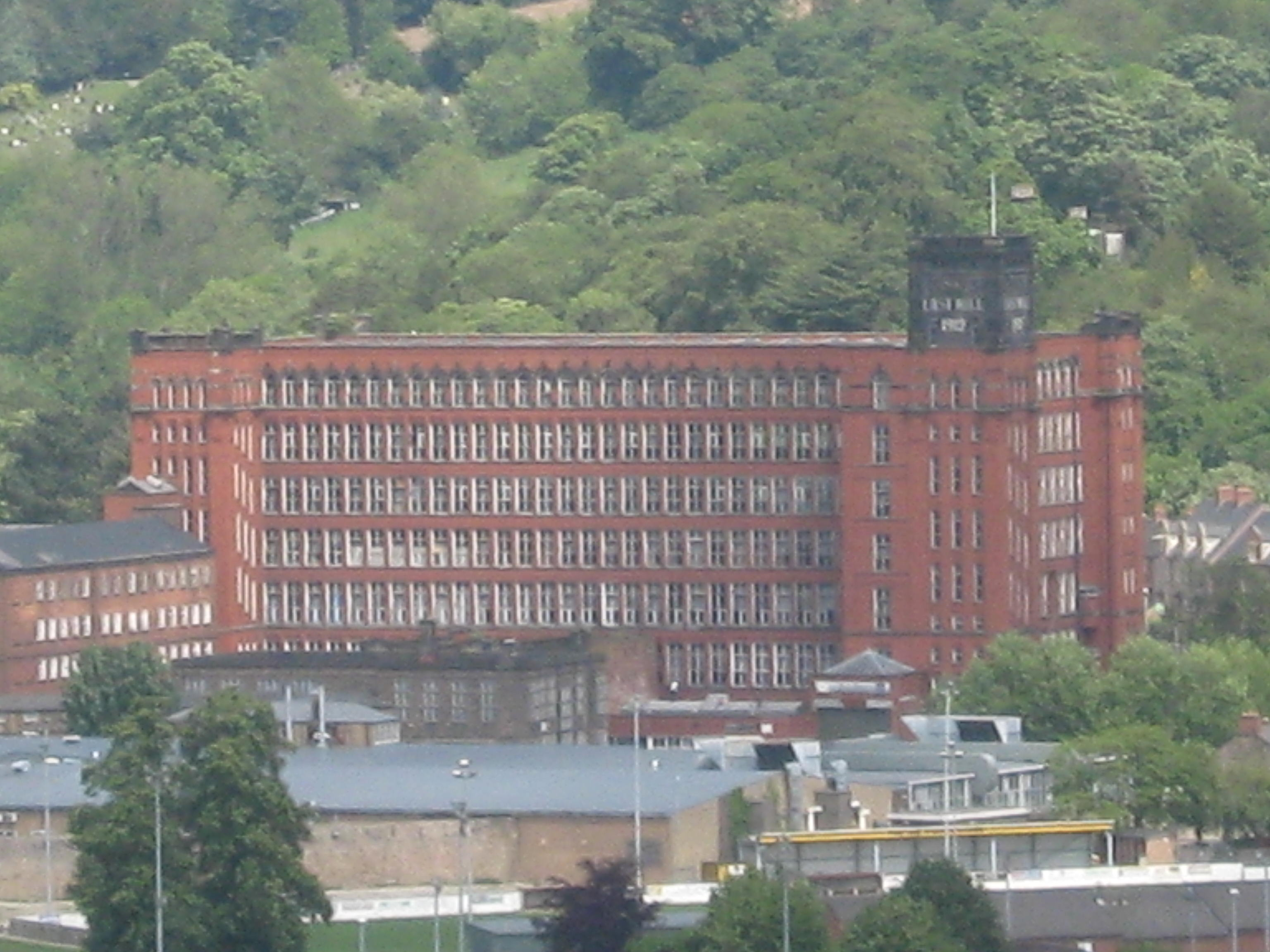
East Mill in Derbyshire, UK

In the United Kingdom, the term "mill town" usually refers to the 19th-century textile manufacturing towns of northern England and the Scottish Lowlands, particularly those in Lancashire (cotton) and Yorkshire (wool).

Some former mill towns have a symbol of the textile industry in their town badge. Some towns may have statues dedicated to textile workers (e.g. Colne) or have a symbol in the badge of local schools (e.g. Ossett School).

| County | Towns |
|---|---|
| Cheshire mill towns | Congleton, Crewe, Macclesfield |
| Derbyshire mill towns | Glossop, Hadfield, New Mills |
| Greater Manchester mill towns | Ashton-under-Lyne, Bolton, Bury, Chadderton, Failsworth, Heywood, Hyde, Lees, Leigh, Manchester, Middleton, Oldham, Radcliffe, Ramsbottom, Reddish, Rochdale, Royton, Shaw and Crompton, Stalybridge, Stockport, Wigan |
| Lancashire mill towns | Accrington, Bacup, Barnoldswick, Blackburn, Burnley, Calder Vale, Chorley, Colne, Darwen, Nelson, Oakenclough, Padiham, Preston for others see table below. |
| Yorkshire mill towns | Batley, Bingley, Bradford, Brighouse, Cleckheaton, Dewsbury, Elland, Halifax, Hebden Bridge, Heckmondwike, Holmfirth, Huddersfield, Keighley, Morley, Mytholmroyd, Ossett, Pudsey, Shipley, Skipton, Sowerby Bridge, Todmorden, Yeadon |

The list above includes some towns where textiles was not the predominant industry. For example, mining was a key industry in Wigan and Leigh in Greater Manchester, and in Ossett in Yorkshire.

Spindleage of some large mill towns in and around Greater Manchester (Note: Sourced from a book entitled Cotton Mills of Greater Manchester, although not all of these towns are within Greater Manchester.) between 1830 and 1962
| Date | 1883 | 1893 | 1903 | 1913 | 1923 | 1926 | 1933 | 1944 | 1953 | 1962 |
|---|---|---|---|---|---|---|---|---|---|---|
| Accrington | 590 | 438 | 467 | 660 | 191 | 718 | 469 | 287 | 152 | 92 |
| Ashton | 1,574 | 1,731 | 1,781 | 1,955 | 1898 | 1,144 | 644 | 633 | 182 | |
| Blackburn | 1,671 | 1,398 | 1,321 | 1,280 | 1,224 | 1,071 | 672 | 451 | 309 | 103 |
| Bolton | 4,086 | 4,770 | 5,457 | 6,797 | 7,371 | 7,842 | 7,507 | 6,204 | 4,886 | 1,772 |
| Burnley | 1,126 | 734 | 667 | 563 | 538 | 507 | 240 | 182 | 144 | 14 |
| Bury | 875 | 899 | 833 | 955 | 1050 | 1000 | 745 | 630 | 524 | 268 |
| Chorley | 552 | 527 | 541 | 856 | 838 | 837 | 739 | 491 | 397 | 122 |
| Farnworth | 557 | 779 | 966 | 1,485 | 1,478 | 1,484 | 1,344 | 1,237 | 1,104 | 162 |
| Glossop | 1,106 | 1,158 | 968 | 882 | 821 | 839 | 524 | 204 | 154 | 10 |
| Heywood | 660 | 887 | 836 | 1,070 | 1,100 | 1,096 | 864 | 545 | 533 | 68 |
| Hyde | 590 | 499 | 533 | 741 | 793 | 696 | 475 | 366 | 337 | 58 |
| Leigh | 1,337 | 1,514 | 1,679 | 2,445 | 2,761 | 2,925 | 2,891 | 2,615 | 2,336 | 548 |
| Manchester | 2,445 | 2,353, | 2,225 | 3,703 | 3,307 | 3,439 | 3,417 | 2,974 | 1,934 | 271 |
| Middleton | 498 | 494 | 645 | 1,278 | 1,268 | 1,252 | 1,041 | 1,193 | 923 | 161 |
| Mossley | 1,153 | 1,217 | 1,033 | 1,288 | 1,297 | 1,289 | 371 | 264 | 256 | - |
| Oldham | 9,311 | 11,159 | 12,230 | 16,909 | 17,231 | 17,669 | 13,732 | 8,948 | 7,621 | 2,478 |
| Preston | 2,146 | 1,883 | 2,074 | 2,161 | 1,997 | 1,965 | 1,592 | 1,146 | 1,024 | 278 |
| Rochdale | 1,627 | 1,835 | 2,422 | 3,645 | 3,749 | 3,793 | 3,539 | 2,459 | 1,936 | 983 |
| Stalybridge | 1,083 | 1,157 | 1,027 | 1,236 | 1,104 | 1,103 | 801 | 483 | 426 | 122 |
| Stockport | 1,601 | 1,742 | 1,568 | 2,266 | 2,382 | 1,924 | 1,427 | 1,141 | 154 | |
| Wigan | 864 | 775 | 888 | 1,085 | 1,123 | 1,141 | 922 | 681 | 575 | 352 |

In thousands of spindles.

On his tour of northern England in 1849, Scottish publisher Angus Reach said:

In general, these towns wear a monotonous sameness of aspect, physical and moral ... In fact, the social condition of the different town populations is almost as much alike as the material appearance of the tall chimneys under which they live. Here and there the height of the latter may differ by a few rounds of brick, but in all essential respects, a description of one is a description of all.

— Angus Reach, Morning Chronicle, 1849

The term mill town was revived in the British media during the debate over relations between whites and Asians in the aftermath of riots in several mill towns in the early 2000s, including the 2001 Oldham and Bradford riots. The term conveniently groups together towns on both sides of the Pennines that suffer from sometimes significant racial tension. Some mill towns in northern England are known today as "mill and mosque towns" because of the large number of British Pakistani Muslims who live there. After the Second World War, thousands of migrants from both the Caribbean and the Indian subcontinent settled in the mill towns to fill the labour shortage in the industry; they moved to traditional working-class areas whilst the white working-class moved out to the newly built estates after the war.

== North America ==
=== United States ===
==== New England and Northeast ====
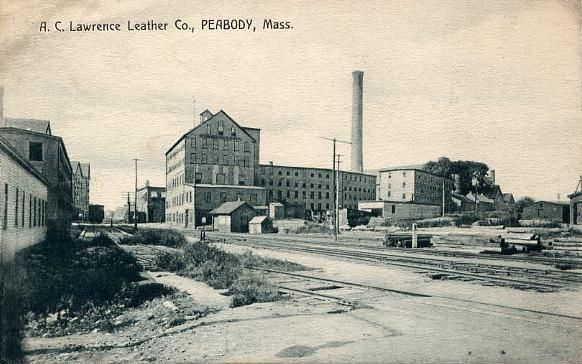
Peabody, Massachusetts A. C. Lawrence Leather Co. a factory town c. 1910.

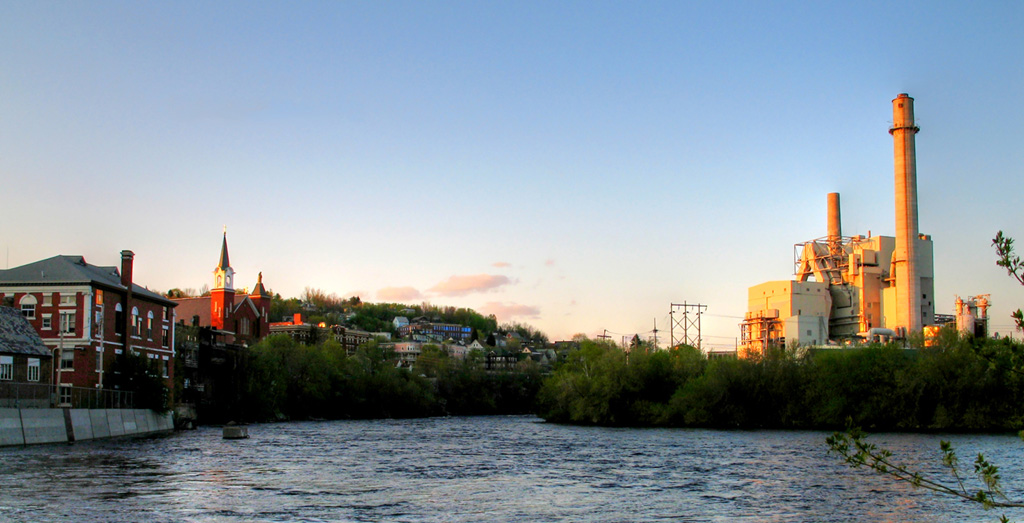
The Androscoggin River at Berlin, New Hampshire

Beginning with Samuel Slater and technological information smuggled out of England by Francis Cabot Lowell, large mills were established in New England in the early to mid-19th century. Mill towns, sometimes planned, built and owned as company towns, grew in the shadow of the industries. The region became a manufacturing powerhouse along rivers like the Housatonic, Quinebaug, Shetucket, Blackstone, Merrimack, Nashua, Cocheco, Saco, Androscoggin, Kennebec, and Winooski.

In the 20th century, alternatives to water power were developed, and it became more profitable for companies to manufacture textiles in southern states where cotton was grown and winters did not require significant heating costs. Finally, the Great Depression acted as a catalyst that sent several struggling New England firms into bankruptcy.

| State | Towns |
|---|---|
| Connecticut mill towns | Ansonia, Bridgeport, Bristol, Collinsville, Danbury, Derby, East Windsor, Enfield, Glastonbury, Griswold, Hartford, Killingly, Madison, Manchester, Mansfield, Meriden, Middletown, Milford, Naugatuck, New Britain, New Haven, New London, Norwich, Putnam, Redding, Sandy Hook, Seymour, Shelton, Torrington, Vernon, Waterbury, Willimantic, Winchester, Windham, Windsor Locks |
| Maine mill towns | Anson, Auburn, Augusta, Baileyville, Biddeford, Brunswick, Chisholm, Corinna, Lewiston, Lincoln, Lisbon Falls, Livermore Falls, Millinocket, Milo, Monmouth, Newport, Old Town, Orono, Pittsfield, Portland, Rumford, Saco, Sanford, Skowhegan, Waterville, Westbrook, Wilton |
| Massachusetts mill towns See also: List of mill towns in Massachusetts | Adams, Amesbury, Athol, Attleboro, Boston, Chicopee, Clinton, Dalton, Dedham, Fall River, Fitchburg, Framingham, Gardner, Grafton, Greenfield, Haverhill, Holyoke, Hopesdale, Hudson, Lawrence, Lowell, Ludlow, Lynn, Maynard, Medford, Merrimac, Methuen, Milford, Millbury, Monson, New Bedford, North Adams, North Andover, Northbridge, Orange, Palmer, Peabody, Pittsfield, Rowley, Russell, Salem, Southbridge, Springfield, Taunton, Uxbridge, Waltham, Ware, Webster, Westborough, Winchendon, Worcester |
| New Hampshire mill towns | Belmont, Berlin, Claremont, Concord, Dover, East Rochester, Franklin, Gonic, Gorham, Greenville, Groveton, Harrisville, Jaffrey, Keene, Laconia, Lancaster, Lebanon, Lincoln, Manchester, Milford, Milton, Nashua, Newmarket, Newport, Penacook, Pittsfield, Rochester, Rollinsford, Somersworth, Suncook, Tilton, Troy, Wilton |
| New Jersey mill towns | Allaire, Allentown, Bernards, Boonton, Butler, Camden, Chester, Clinton, Cranbury, Cranford, Dover, Dunellen, Eatontown, Elizabeth, Freehold, Griggstown, Helmetta, Hillsborough, Imlaystown, Jamesburg, Kearny, Kingston, Little Falls, Manalapan, Manville, Medford, Milltown, Millville, New Brunswick, Newark, Orange, Paterson, Perth Amboy, Plainfield, Prallsville, Rahway, Raritan, Roselle Park, Sayreville, Scobeyville, Smithville, South Brunswick, Stillwater, Tinton Falls, Trenton, Walnford, Wharton, Woodbridge |
| New York mill towns | Albany, Amsterdam, Aurora-on-Cayuga, Beacon, Belmont, Bloomvale, Buffalo, Clinton, Cohoes, Cold Spring, Corning, Dumbo, Gardiner, Gloversville, Ithaca, Johnstown, Kingston, Little Falls, Marlboro, Mechanicville, Middletown, Montgomery, New Berlin, New York Mills, Newburgh, Newcomb, Niles, Philmont, Poughkeepsie, Rochester, Rome, Roslyn, Saddle Rock, Schenectady, Schuylerville, Seneca Falls, Sleepy Hollow, Stony Brook, Sunset Park, Syracuse, Troy, Utica, Victory, Water Mill |
| Rhode Island mill towns | Bristol, Burrillville, Central Falls, Coventry, Cumberland, Lincoln, Pawtucket, Providence, Slatersville, Valley Falls, West Warwick, Westerly, Woonsocket |
| Vermont mill towns | Bellows Falls, Bethel, Brattleboro, Bridgewater, Burlington, Ludlow, Newport, Springfield, Vergennes, Winooski |

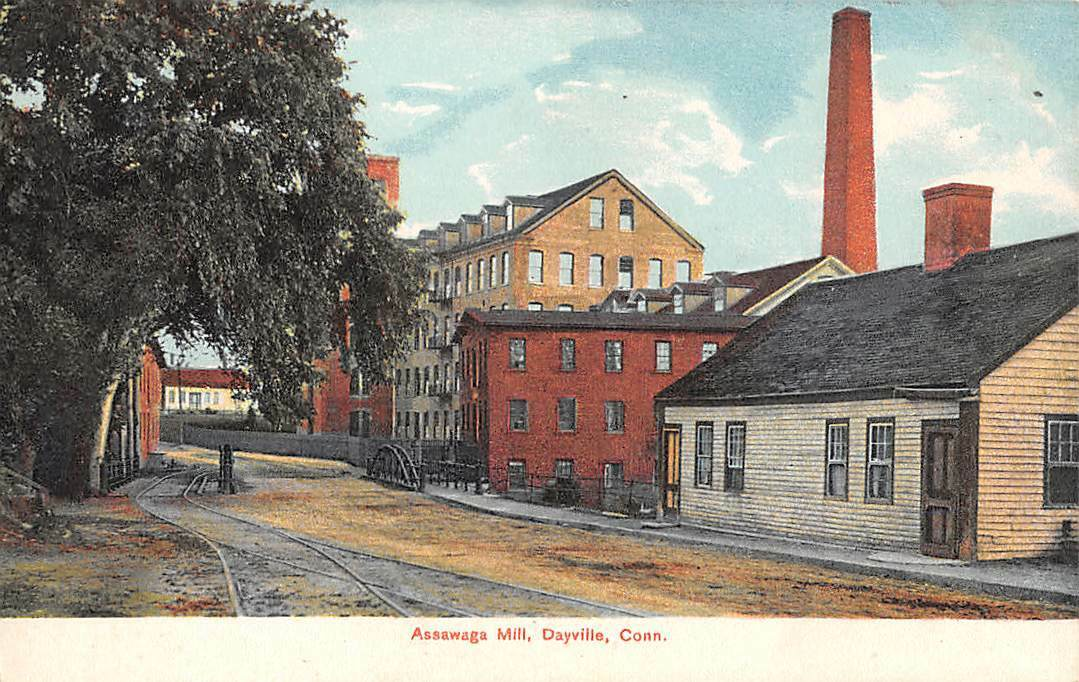
Assawaga Mill, Dayville, CT, in 1909

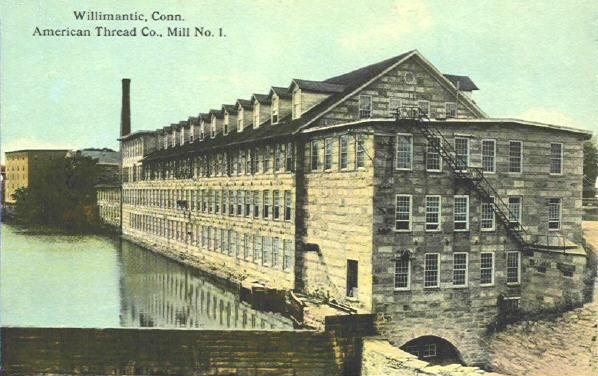
American Thread Co. Mill, Willimantic, CT, c. 1910

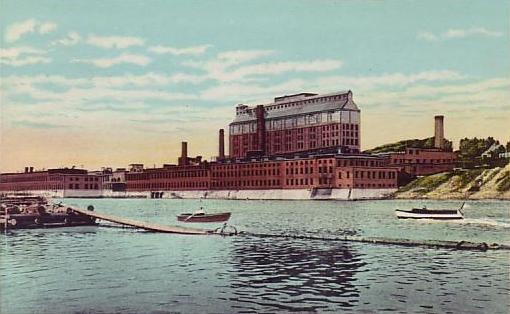
Hollingsworth & Whitney Paper Mill, Waterville, ME, c. 1920

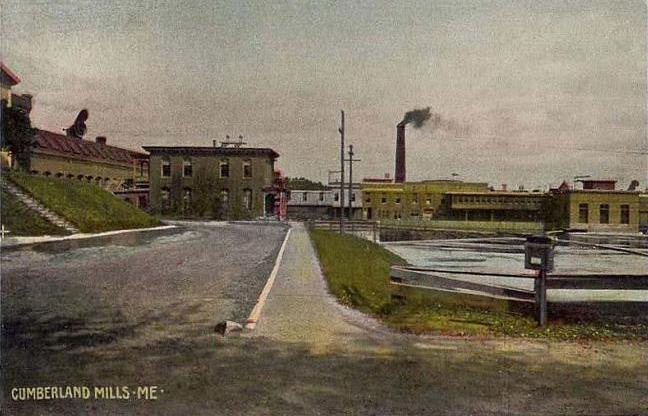
Cumberland Mills, Westbrook, ME, c. 1902

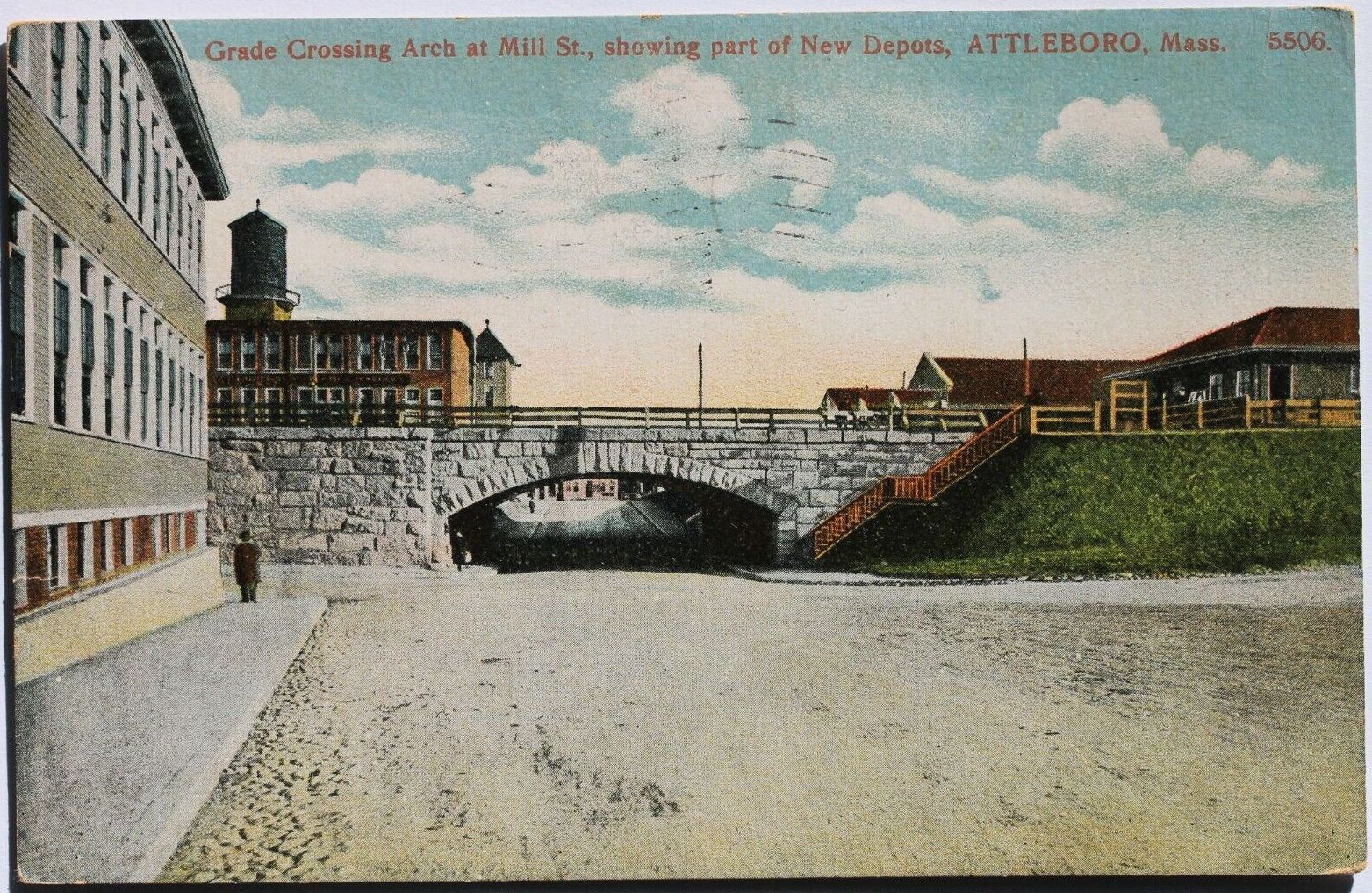
Mill Street, Attleboro, MA, in 1908

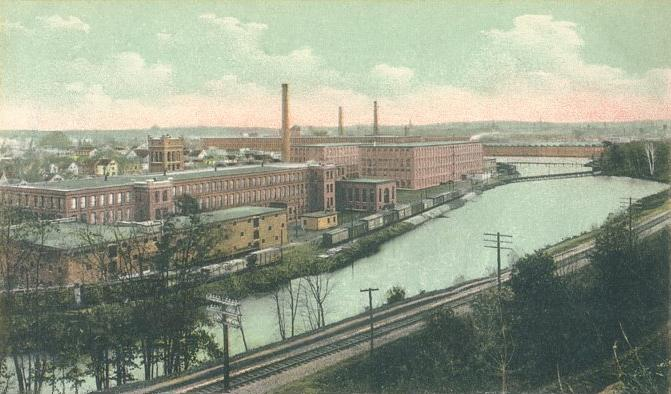
Arlington Mills, Lawrence, MA, in 1907

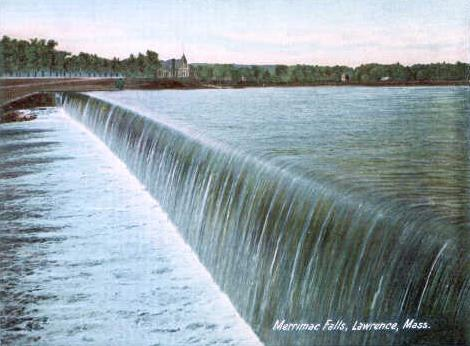
Merrimack Falls, Lawrence, MA, c. 1905

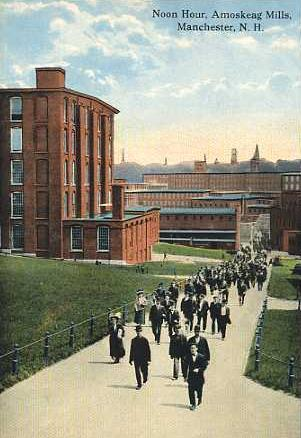
Amoskeag Mills, Manchester, NH, c. 1912

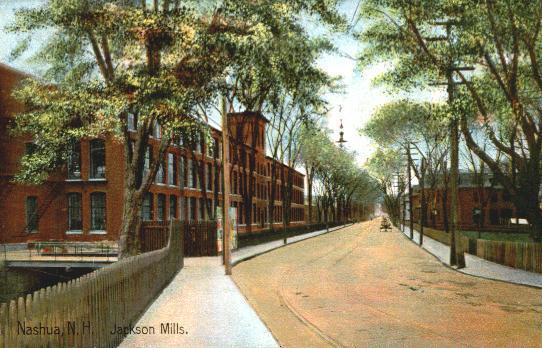
Jackson Mills, Nashua, NH, in 1907

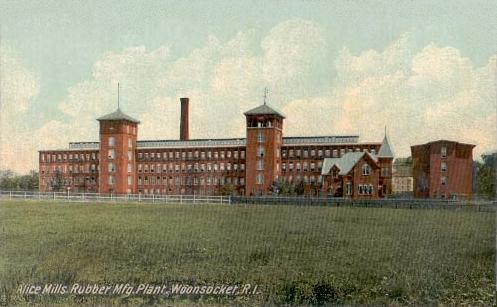
Alice Mills, Woonsocket, RI, in 1911

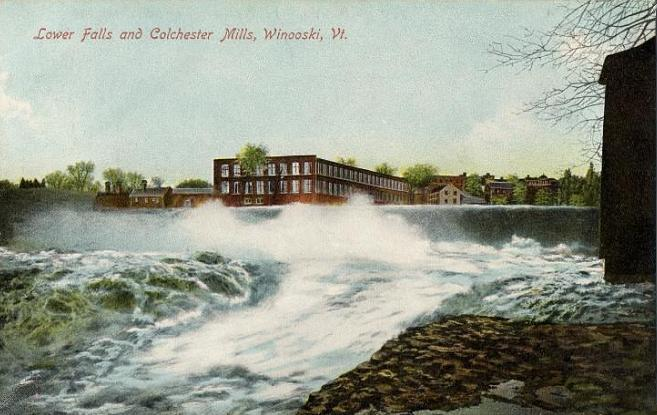
Colchester Mills, Winooski, VT, in 1907

==== Midwest ====
| State | Towns |
|---|---|
| Wisconsin mill towns | Biron (Biron Mill) |

==== South ====
| State | Towns |
|---|---|
| Alabama mill towns | Fairfax (Fairfax Mill and Fair View Mill), Lanett (Lanett Mill), Langdale (Langdale Mill), Sylacauga (Avondale Mill), Opelika (Opelika Mill), River View (Riverdale Mill), Shawmut (Shawmut Mill), Valley (Carter/Lanier Mill) |
| Arkansas mill towns | Amity, Beirne, Calion, Crossett, Delight, Dierks, Glenwood, Jones Mill, Leola, Malvern, Mountain Pine |
| Georgia mill towns | Bibb City, Cabbagetown, Chicopee, Hogansville, New Holland, New Manchester |
| Maryland mill towns | Ellicott City, Jerusalem, Oella, Owings Mills, Savage |
| North Carolina mill towns | Alamance, Altamahaw, Bellemont, Burlington, Bynum, Canton, Caroleen, Carolina, Carrboro, Cliffside, Coleridge, Concord, Cooleemee, Cramerton, Drexel, Eden, Edgemont (East Durham), Enka, Falls, Franklinville, Glen Raven, Glencoe, Hanes, Haw River, Henrietta, High Falls, High Shoals, Hildebran, Hope Mills, Kannapolis, Long Shoals, Mayodan, McAdenville, Mooresville, Mount Holly, Oakdale, Ramseur, Rhodhiss, Riegelwood, Roanoke Rapids, Sawmills, Saxapahaw, Spencer Mountain, Swepsonville, West Durham, West Hillsborough |
| South Carolina mill towns | Cateechee, Central, Cherokee Falls, Columbia (Olympia and Granby Mills), Fort Mill, Glendale, Graniteville, Great Falls, Inman, Joanna, La France, Lockhart, Lyman, Newry, Pacolet Mills, Pelzer, Piedmont, Slater-Marietta, Startex, Ware Shoals, Watts Mills, Whitmire, Judson, Dunean, Park Place, City View, Sans Souci |

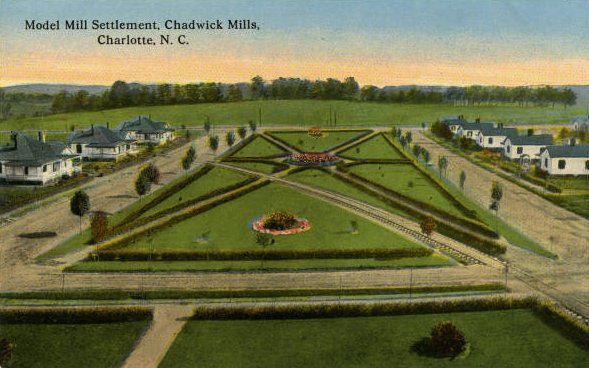
Model Mill Settlement, Chadwick Mills, Charlotte, N.C. Published c. 1905–1915

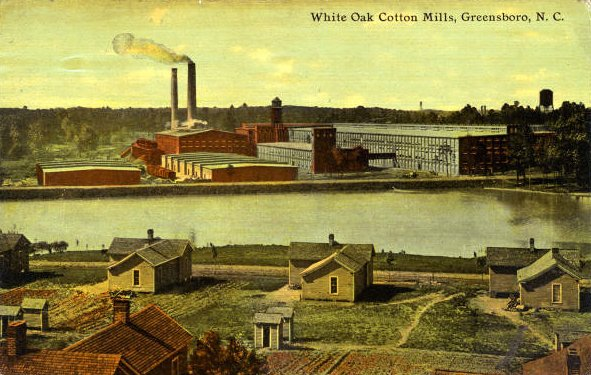
White Oak Cotton Mills, Greensboro, N.C. c. 1914

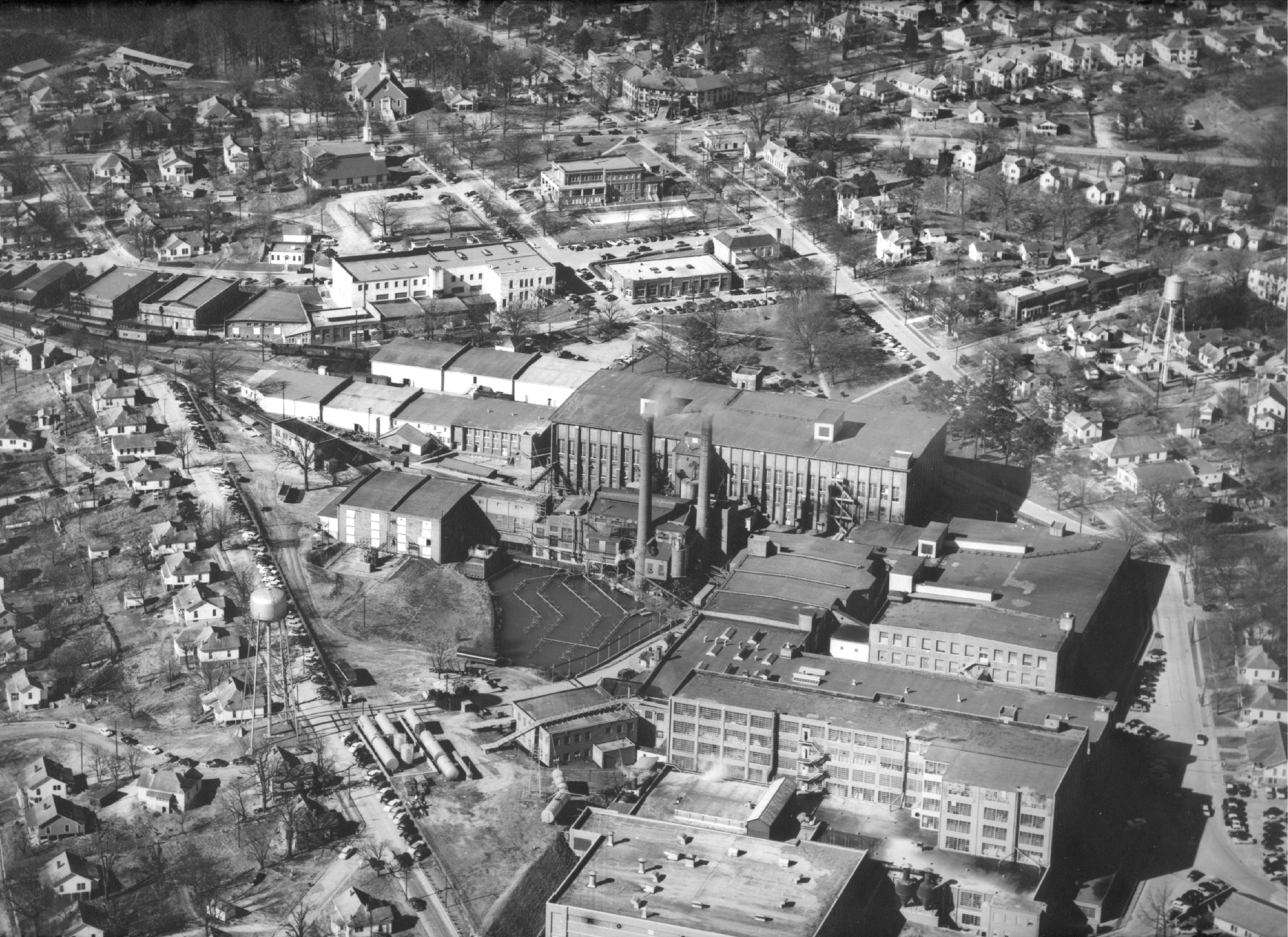
Aerial view of Ware Shoals Mill

=== Sawmill towns ===
| State | Towns |
|---|---|
| Illinois | Carrier Mills, Harrisburg |
| Oregon | Roseburg |
| Washington | Longview |
| Wisconsin | Eau Claire |

== South America ==
=== Colombia ===
- San José de Suaita

== See also ==
- Blackstone River Valley National Heritage Corridor
- Industrial district
- Old Great Falls Historic District, Paterson, NJ
