= Jacob Fork (South Fork Catawba River tributary) =

Stream in North Carolina, USA

Jacob Fork Tributary to South Fork Catawba River
- Location of Jacob Fork mouth Jacob Fork (South Fork Catawba River tributary) (the United States)

Location
- Country: United States
- State: North Carolina
- County: Catawba; Burke

Physical characteristics
- Source: divide between Jacob Fork and He Creek
  - location: near top of Grass Ridge
  - coordinates: 35°35′44″N 081°40′25″W
  - elevation: 2,290 ft (700 m)
- Mouth: South Fork Catawba River
  - location: about 3 miles south of Startown, North Carolina
  - coordinates: 35°38′09″N 081°18′28″W
  - elevation: 798 ft (243 m)
- Length: 41.09 mi (66.13 km)
- Basin size: 96.24 square miles (249.3 km^{2})
- Discharge
  - location: South Fork Catawba River
  - average: 144.94 cu ft/s (4.104 m^{3}/s) at mouth with South Fork Catawba River

Basin features
- Progression: east-northeast
- River system: Catawba River
- Tributaries
  - left: Shinny Creek; Little River; Rock Creek; Douglas Creek; Camp Creek; Hop Creek
  - right: Nettle Branch; White Oak Creek; Queens Creek; Camp Creek
- Waterbodies: unnamed reservoir
- Bridges: South Mountain Park Avenue (x4), Deer Drive, Old NC 18, Rhoney Road, Will Hudson Road, Roger Hill Road, NC 18, Old Shelby Road, Providence Church Road, Greedy Highway, NC 127, Finger Bridge Road, Zion Church Road

Jacob Fork is a 41.09-mile (66.13 km) long, fourth-order tributary of the South Fork Catawba River in Burke and Catawba Counties, North Carolina. According to the Geographic Names Information System, it has also been known historically as Jacobs Creek.

Jacob Fork rises near the top of Grassy Ridge in Burke County, North Carolina, on the He Creek divide, then flows east into Catawba County to form South Fork Catawba River with Henry Fork about 3 miles southwest of Startown. It drains 96.24 sq mi (249.3 km^{2}) of area, receives about 51.2 in/year of precipitation, has a topographic wetness index of 325.14, and is about 64% forested.

== See also ==
- List of North Carolina rivers
