= South Fork Catawba River =

Stream in North Carolina, USA

South Fork Catawba River Tributary to Catawba River
- Location of South Fork Catawba River mouth South Fork Catawba River (the United States)

Location
- Country: United States
- State: North Carolina
- County: Catawba; Gaston; Lincoln
- City: Lincolnton; McAdenville; Cramerton; Belmont

Physical characteristics
- Source: confluence of Henry Fork and Jacob Fork
  - location: about 2 miles west of Startown, North Carolina
  - coordinates: 35°38′09″N 081°18′29″W
  - elevation: 798 ft (243 m)
- Mouth: Catawba River
  - location: Lake Wylie
  - coordinates: 35°08′59″N 081°01′58″W
  - elevation: 569 ft (173 m)
- Length: 54.96 mi (88.45 km)
- Basin size: 660.78 square miles (1,711.4 km^{2})
- Discharge
  - location: Catawba River (Lake Wylie)
  - average: 843.05 cu ft/s (23.873 m^{3}/s) at mouth with Catawba River

Basin features
- Progression: southeast
- River system: Catawba River
- Tributaries
  - left: Henry Fork; Clark Creek; Muddy Creek; Lithia Branch; Hoyle Creek
  - right: Jacob Fork; Pott Creek; Howards Creek; Indian Creek; Beaverdam Creek; Sulphur Branch; Rattle Shoal Creek; Coley Creek; Long Creek; DuHarts Creek
- Waterbodies: Lake Wylie
- Bridges: NC 10, Blackburn Bridge Road, Reepsville Road, S Grove Street, US 321, Laboratory Road, South Fork Road, Long Shoals Road, US 321, S Lincoln Street, Hardin Road, Philadelphia Church Road, Dallas Stanley Highway, Stanley-Spencer Mountain Road, I-85, Hickory Grove Road, US 74, North Main Street, Armstrong Ford Road, Armstrong Road

The South Fork Catawba River (better known as the South Fork River) begins south of Hickory, North Carolina just northwest of the intersection of US Highway 321 and North Carolina Highway 10, at the confluence of the Henry Fork and Jacob Fork located adjacent to the east side of the Jacob Fork Newton City Park. The South Fork Catawba River travels 48.5 miles, passing along the communities of Lincolnton, High Shoals, McAdenville, and Cramerton, to Lake Wylie where its now submerged confluence with the Catawba River lies near the North Carolina and South Carolina border.

Signage on roadways crossing the river acknowledge it as the "South Fork River".

The river is part of the Santee River Watershed.

== Variant names ==
According to the Geographic Names Information System, it has also been known historically as:

- Little Catawba River
- South Fork
- South Fork River
- South Fork of the Catawbaw River

== See also ==
- List of North Carolina rivers
