= McAdenville Historic District =

Historic district in North Carolina, United States

- U.S. National Register of Historic Places
- U.S. Historic district
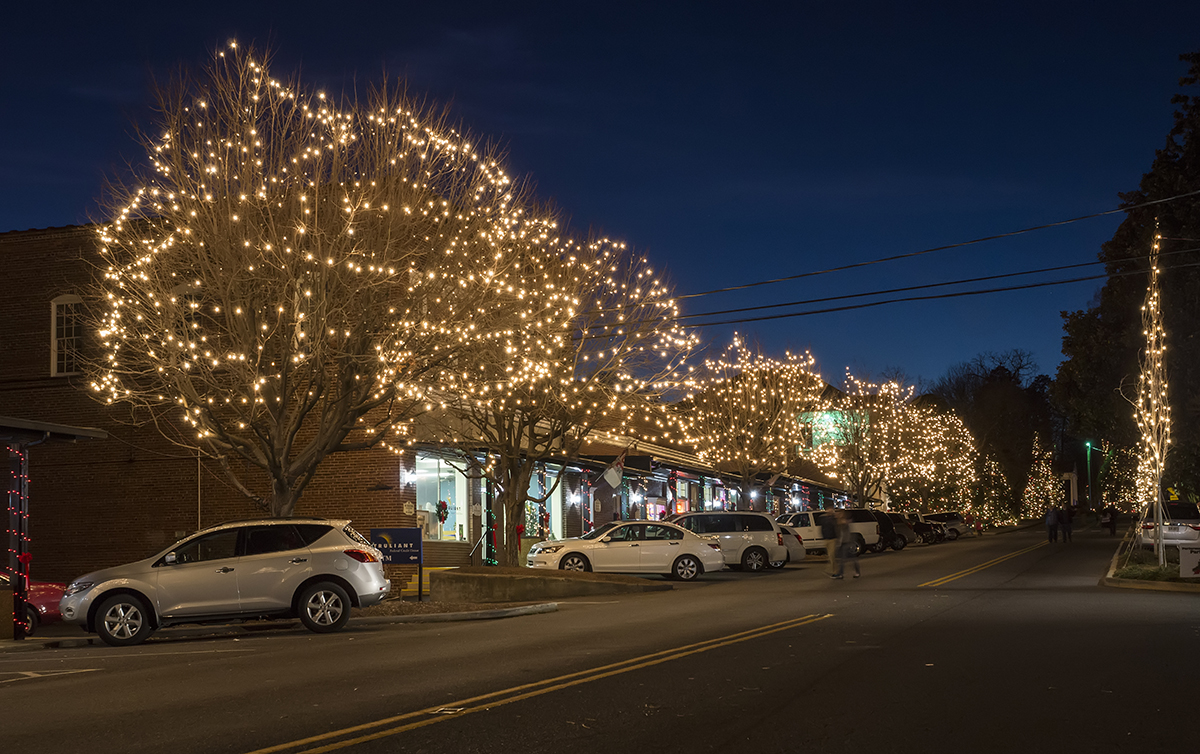
- McAdenville Historic District, December 2012

- Location within North Carolina Location within the United States
- Location: 100-413 Main St., Elm and Poplar Sts., and cross sts. from I-85 to S. Fork of Catawba River, McAdenville, North Carolina
- Coordinates: 35°15′38″N 81°04′50″W
- Area: 85 acres (34 ha)
- Built: 1884
- Architect: Draper, Earle Sumner; et al.
- Architectural style: Late Victorian, Italianate
- NRHP reference No.: 08001412
- Added to NRHP: February 5, 2009

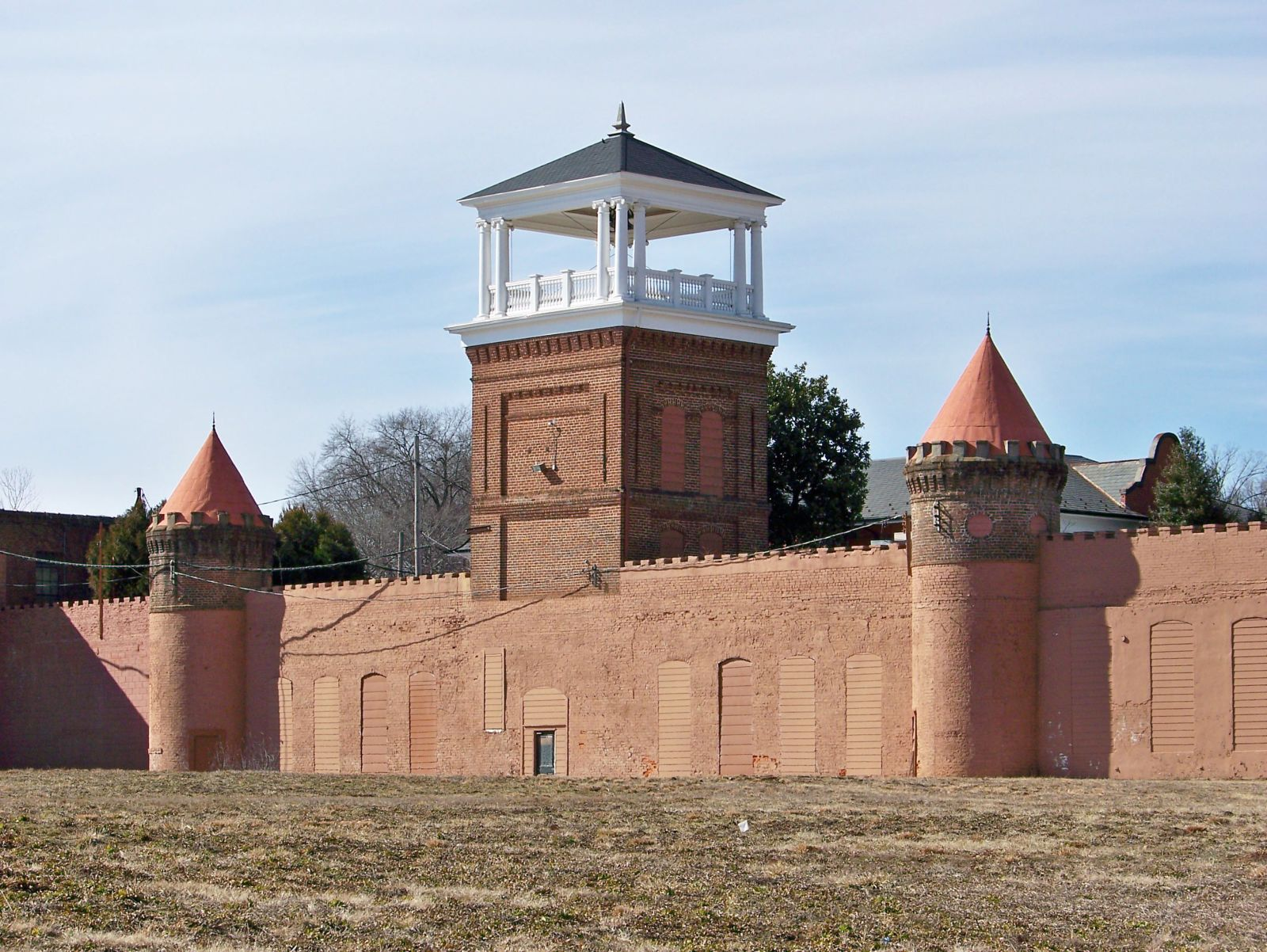
McAden Mill No. 2

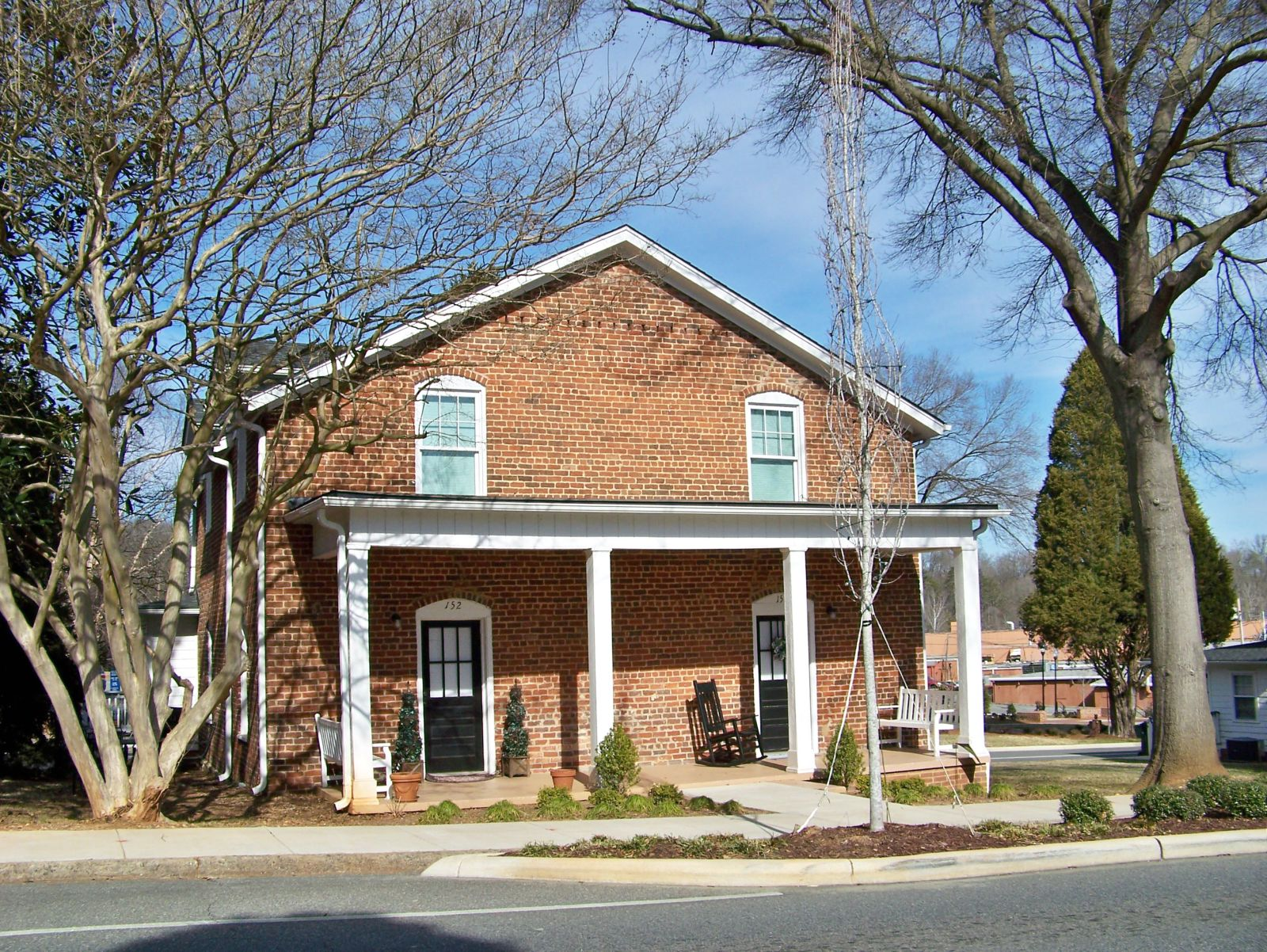
Typical McAdenville Mill Village Home

McAdenville Historic District is a national historic district located at McAdenville, Gaston County, North Carolina. It encompasses 93 contributing buildings, 2 contributing sites, and 7 contributing structures in the mill village associated with McAden Mills, a cotton mill chartered by the state legislature in 1881. The buildings were built between about 1884 and 1959, and include notable examples of Late Victorian and Italianate architecture. Notable buildings include 15 brick mill worker houses, remnants of McAden Mill No. 1 (1881–82) and McAden Mill No. 2 (1884–85), McAden Mill No. 3 (1906–07), and Pharr Corporate Offices (1906, c. 1955, c.1965) redesigned by Earle Sumner Draper.

It was listed on the National Register of Historic Places in 2009.
