= Alexander Manufacturing Company Mill Village Historic District =

Historic district in North Carolina, United States

- U.S. National Register of Historic Places
- U.S. Historic district
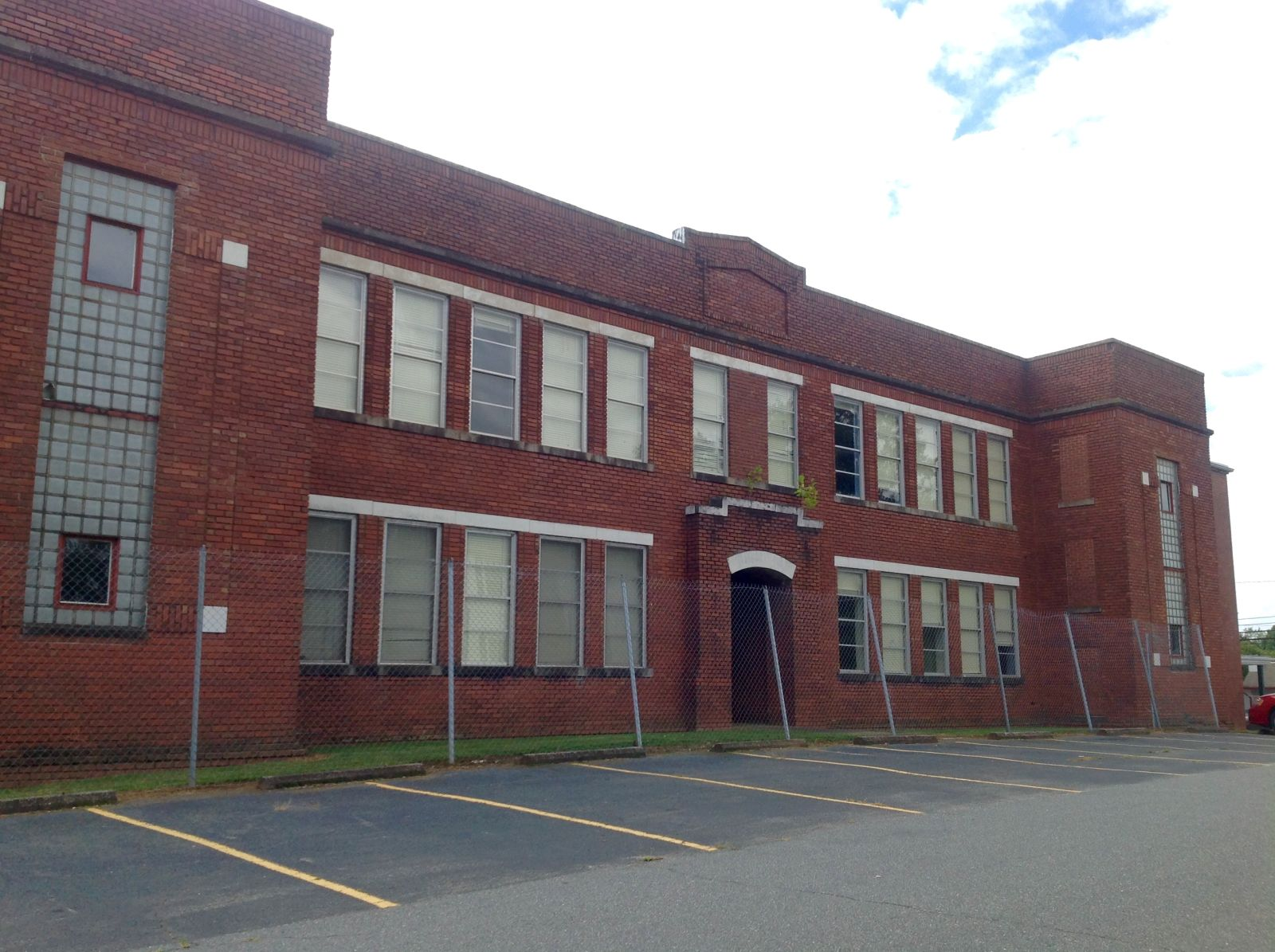
- Former Alexander School

- Location within North Carolina Location within the United States
- Location: Roughly bounded by Victory & Wilson Drs., Allen & S. Broadway Sts., Forest City, North Carolina
- Coordinates: 35°18′37″N 81°51′22″W
- Area: 65 acres (26 ha)
- Architect: Draper, Earle Sumner; Landscape Architect
- Architectural style: Bungalow/craftsman, Colonial Revival
- NRHP reference No.: 08000413
- Added to NRHP: May 15, 2008

Alexander Manufacturing Company Mill Village Historic District is a national historic district located at Forest City, Rutherford County, North Carolina, United States. It encompasses 87 contributing buildings in a predominantly residential section of Forest City developed by the Alexander Manufacturing Company. The mill village developed after 1918, and includes notable examples of Colonial Revival and Bungalow / American Craftsman style architecture. Landscape architect Earle Sumner Draper planned the curvilinear village plan. Notable buildings include the Alexander Manufacturing Company mill complex, former Alexander School, and Alexander Baptist Church.

It was added to the National Register of Historic Places in 2008.
