= Erlanger Mill Village Historic District =

Historic district in North Carolina, United States

- U.S. National Register of Historic Places
- U.S. Historic district
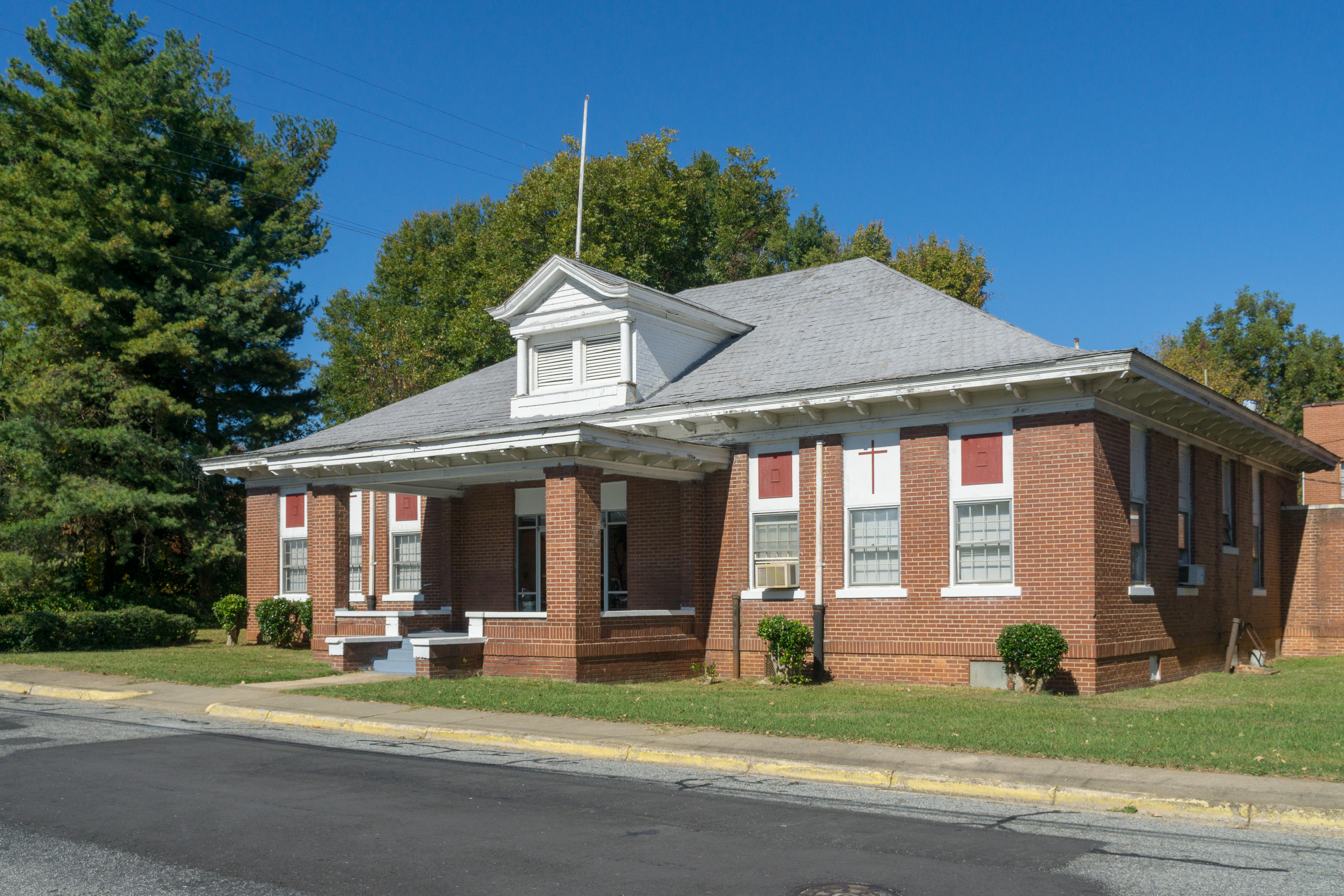

- Location within North Carolina Location within the United States
- Location: Roughly bounded by Winston Rd., Short, 7th, Hames, Second Rainbow, Park Circle, & Olympia Sts., Lexington, North Carolina
- Coordinates: 35°50′23″N 80°15′20″W
- Area: 85 acres (34 ha)
- Built: 1913
- Architect: Draper, Earle Sumner
- Architectural style: Bungalow/craftsman, Gothic Revival
- NRHP reference No.: 07001371
- Added to NRHP: January 9, 2008

Erlanger Mill Village Historic District is a national historic district located at Lexington, Davidson County, North Carolina, USA. The district encompasses 282 contributing buildings and 7 contributing structures in a predominantly residential section of Lexington. The mill village dwellings were built between about 1916 and 1929 and include notable examples of Bungalow / American Craftsman style architecture. The dwellings were constructed by the Erlanger Mill Company as worker's housing and in a subdivision designed by noted landscape architect Earle Sumner Draper (1893–1994). The mill itself is a complex of one- and two-story mill buildings constructed from 1913 through the 1960s. Also located in the district are the Erlanger Baptist Church (1936) and Erlanger Graded School (c. 1920).

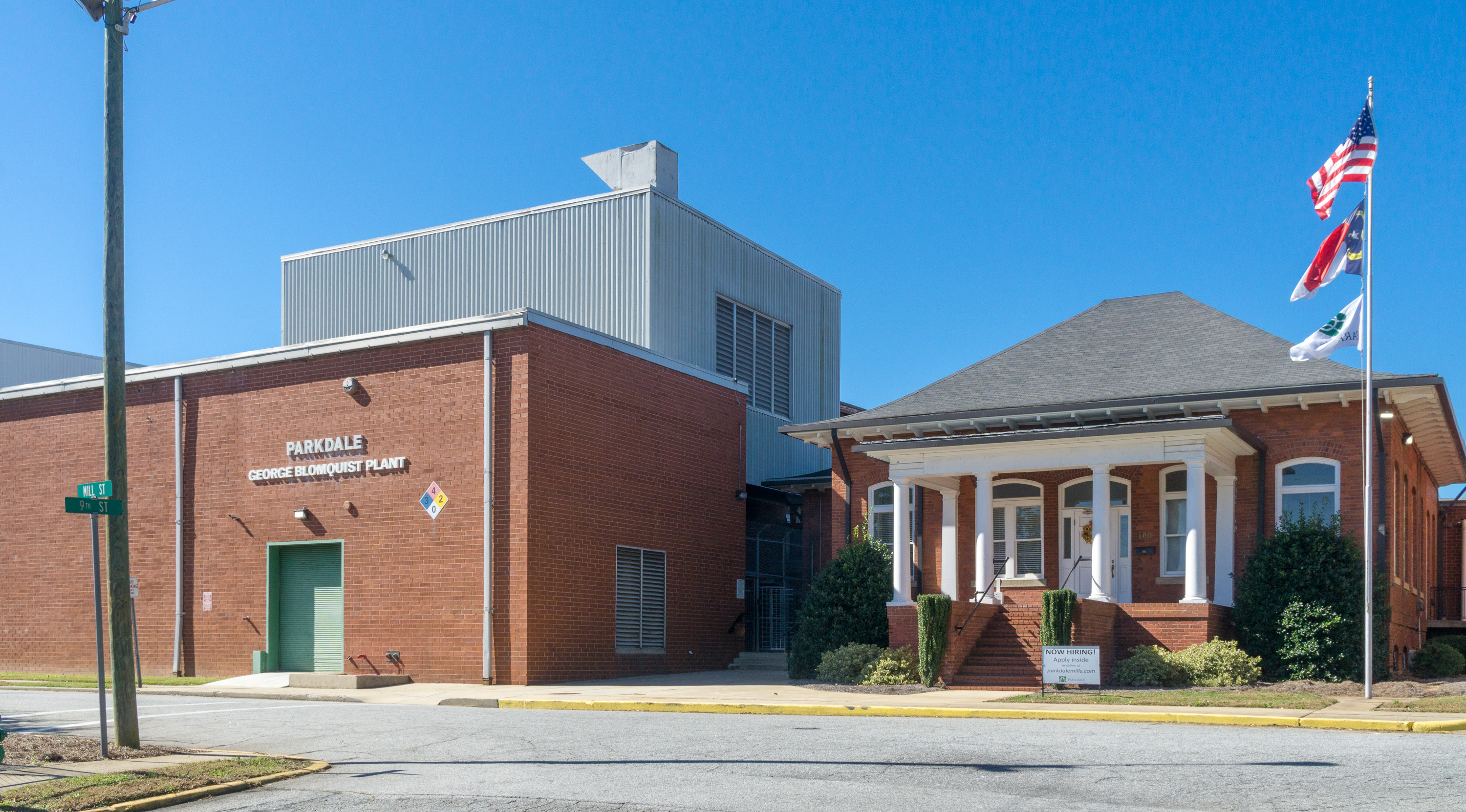
Erlanger Mill Village Historic District, Lexington, North Carolina

It was added to the National Register of Historic Places in 2008.

== See also ==
- National Register of Historic Places listings in Davidson County, North Carolina
