= Noginsk =

City in Moscow Oblast, Russia

Noginsk Bogorodsk (until 1930) Ноги́нск
- City
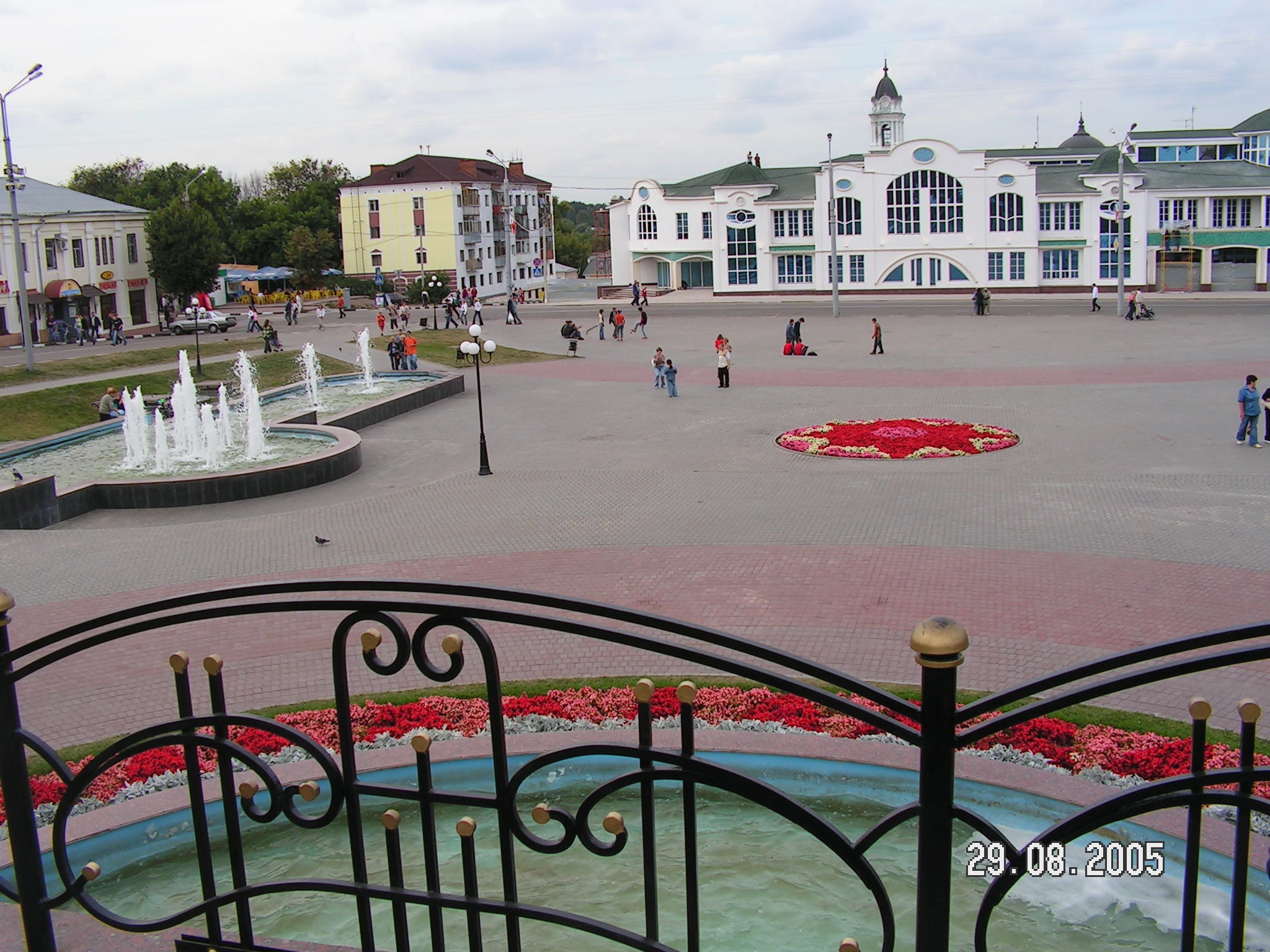
- Central square in Noginsk

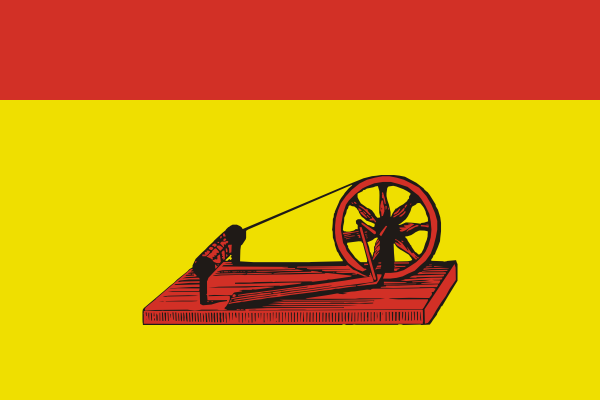
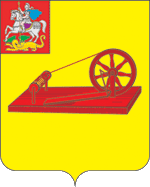
- Flag Coat of arms
- Interactive map of Noginsk; Bogorodsk (until 1930)
- Location of Noginsk; Bogorodsk (until 1930) Noginsk; Bogorodsk (until 1930) (Moscow Oblast)
- Coordinates: 55°51′N 38°26′E
- Country: Russia
- Federal subject: Moscow Oblast
- Administrative district: Bogorodsky District
- CitySelsoviet: Noginsk
- Founded: 1389

Government
  - Body: Council of Deputies
  - Head: Vladimir Khvatov
- Elevation: 150 m (490 ft)

Population (2010 Census)
  - Total: 100,072
  - Estimate (2025): 103,403 (+3.3%)
  - Rank: 164th in 2010

Administrative status
  - Capital of: Noginsky District, City of Noginsk

Municipal status
  - Municipal district: Noginsky Municipal District
  - Urban settlement: Noginsk Urban Settlement
  - Capital of: Noginsky Municipal District, Noginsk Urban Settlement
- Time zone: UTC+3 (MSK)
- Postal codes: 142400–142012, 142016, 994006
- Dialing code: +7 49651
- OKTMO ID: 46751000001
- Website: www.gorod-noginsk.ru

Noginsk (Russian: Ноги́нск), known as Bogorodsk (Russian: Богородск) until 1930, is a city and the administrative center of Bogorodsky District in Moscow Oblast, Russia, located 34 kilometers (21 mi) east of the Moscow Ring Road on the Klyazma River. Population: 103,891 (2021 census); 100,072 (2010 census); 117,555 (2002 census); 123,020 (1989 Soviet census).

== History ==
Founded in 1389 as Rogozhi, the town was later renamed to Rogozha by 1506, and to Bogorodsk (lit. [a town] of the Mother of God) by a Catherine the Great's decree in 1781, when it was granted town status. Throughout the 19th century and for a good part of the 20th century, the town was a major textile center, processing cotton, silk, and wool. In 1930, the town was renamed Noginsk after Bolshevik Viktor Nogin.

On 5 June 2018, Noginsk became the administrative centre of a new municipality, Bogorodsky District, established within the abolished Noginsky District.

== Administrative and municipal status ==
Within the framework of administrative divisions, Noginsk serves as the administrative center of Bogorodsky District. As an administrative division, it is, together with five rural localities, incorporated within Bogorodsky District as the City of Noginsk. As a municipal division, the City of Noginsk is incorporated within Noginsky Municipal District as Noginsk Urban Settlement.

== Economy ==
The city's industrial production is concentrated on ceramics (two major holdings), food (Biserovo fisheries and a fish factory in Noginsk), beverage (one of Russia's biggest beverage producers is located near Noginsk), and construction materials.

=== Transportation ===
Noginsk is a transport hub, being the intersection of the Nizhny Novgorod Highway, M7 (E22), and the Moscow Minor Ring road.

Rapid transit development plans include a possible construction of a direct high-speed railway line connecting Noginsk to the prospective Serp i Molot railway/metro terminal or Shosse Entuziastov metro station. The public transportation system consists of buses and trams. Noginsk's current commuters' travel to and from Moscow on the M7 Moscow-Nizhny-Novgorod Highway. There is also an indirect railway line going through Fryazevo—the line running the first 16 kilometers (9.9 mi) southward, whereas Moscow lies due west of Noginsk. It was built in the late 19th century for the purposes of the textile industry and is still in use.

== Politics ==
Vladimir Laptev was the head of Noginsk until 2005. As of 2014, Vladimir Khvatov serves as the head of the city.

== Media ==
A guyed mast of a longwave radio broadcasting station is located in Noginsk at 55°50′08″N 38°20′37″E.

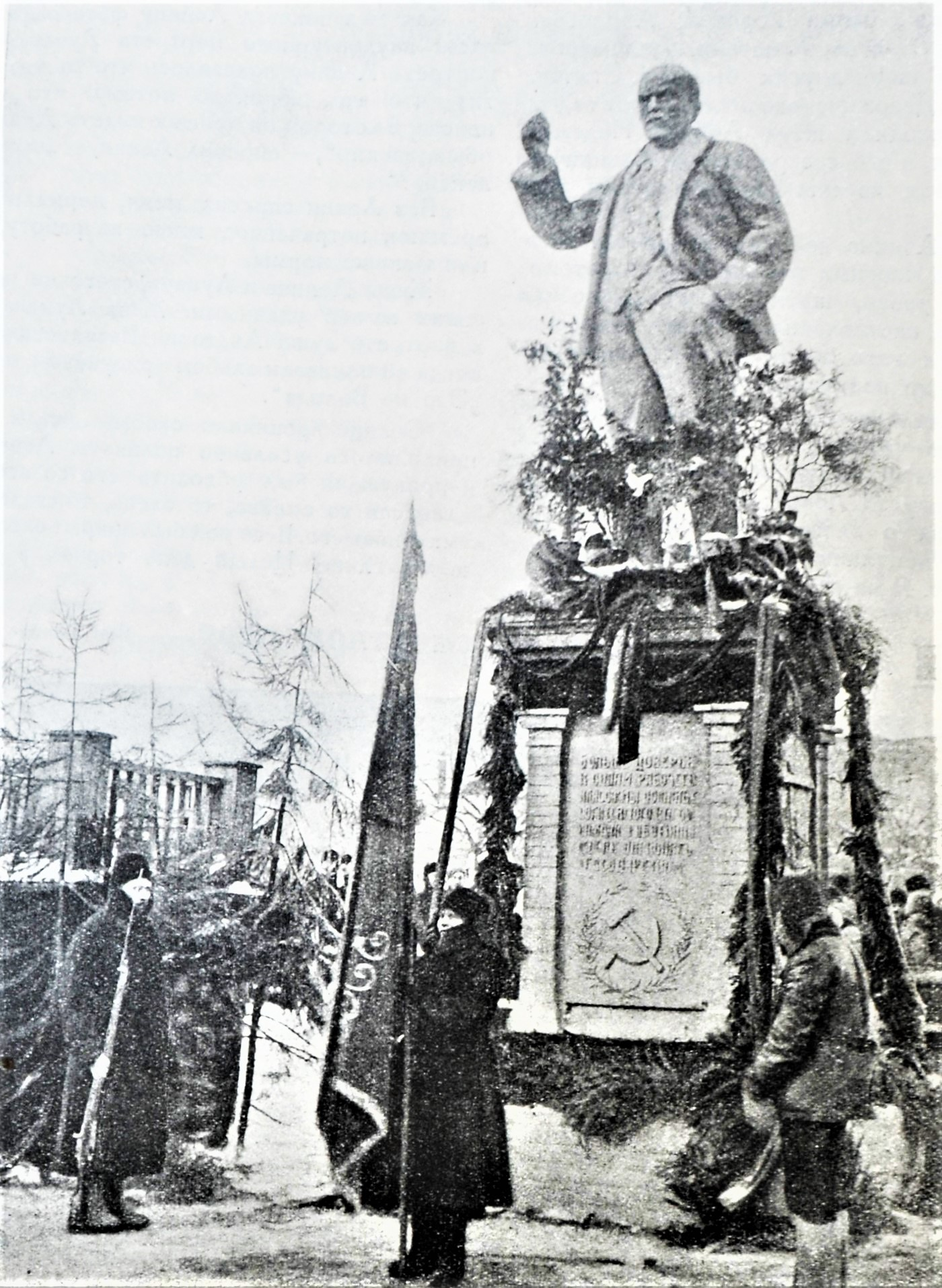
The First Lenin statue in the USSR was built by workers in Noginsk in 1924.

== Sports ==
Noginsk is a home city for a football club Krasnoye Znamya Noginsk which played in Russian Second League from 2020–21 to 2022–23 season.

== Points of interest ==
- the Bogorodsk-Glukhovo factory opened by Savva Vasilyevich Morozov in 1830.
- the oldest monument to Vladimir Lenin (1924)

== Notable people ==
- Pavel Alexandrov (1896–1982), mathematician
- Grigory Fedotov (1916–1957), association football player
- Vladimir Fortov (1946–2020), physicist, a member of the Russian Academy of Sciences
- Vladimir Korotkov (born 1941), professional football coach and a former player
- Anatoly Ivanovich Lipinsky (born 1959), counter admiral
- Pimen I of Moscow (1910–1990), head of the Russian Orthodox Church
- Vladimir Serbsky (1858–1917), one of the founders of the forensic psychiatry in Russia
- Igor Spassky (born 1926), submarine designer
- Igor Talankin (1927–2010), film director and screenwriter
- Sergei Yeliseyev (born 1961), Russian sailors
- Renat Yanbayev (born 1984), association football player
