= Druid Hills Historic District (Hendersonville, North Carolina) =

Historic district in North Carolina, United States

- U.S. National Register of Historic Places
- U.S. Historic district
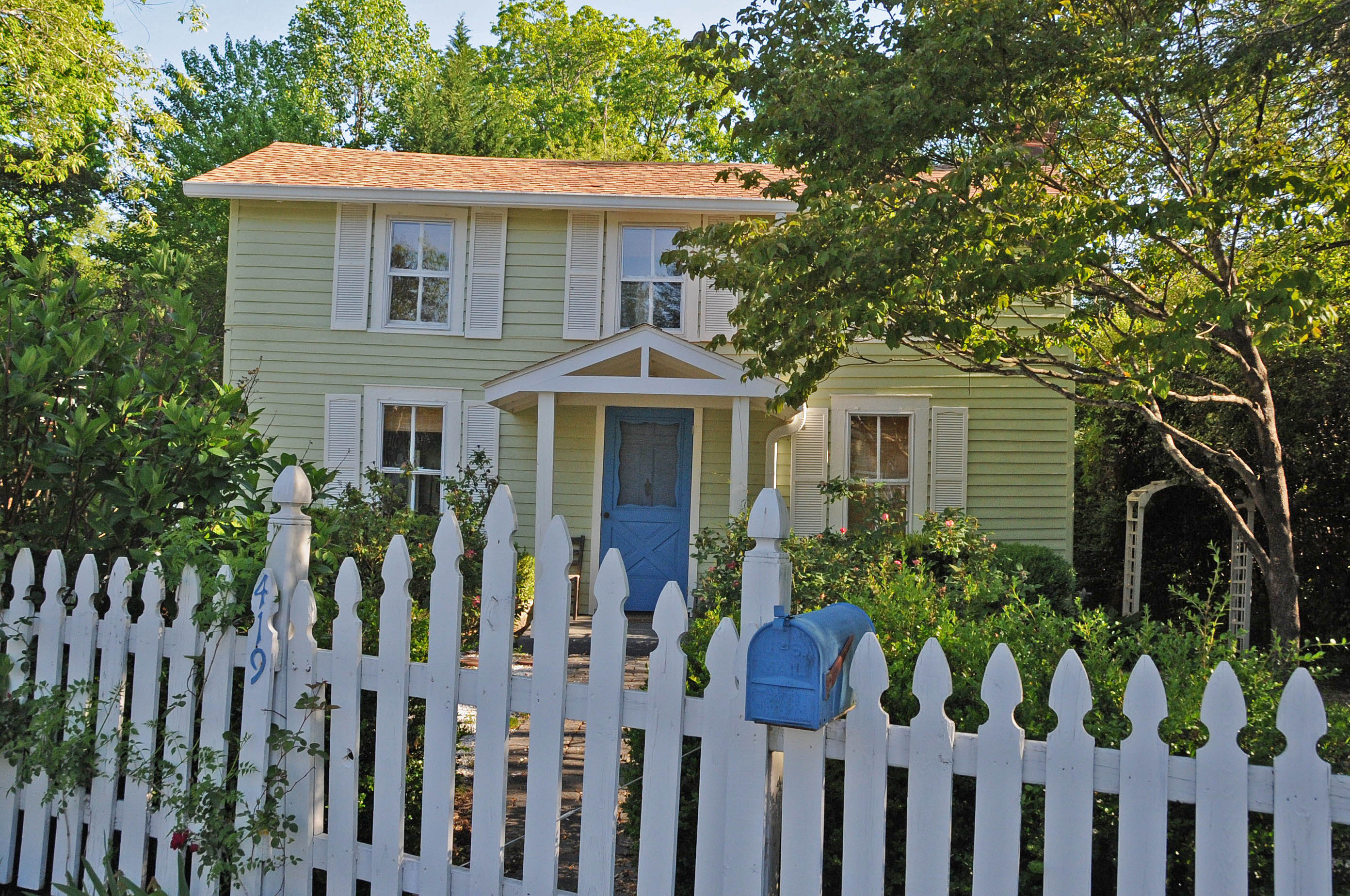

- Location within North Carolina Location within the United States
- Location: Roughly bounded by Meadowbrook Terrace, US 25N, Ashwood Rd., and Ridgewood Ave., Hendersonville, North Carolina
- Coordinates: 35°19′49″N 82°28′16″W
- Area: 27 acres (11 ha)
- Built: 1923
- Architect: Draper, Earle Sumner
- Architectural style: Bungalow/craftsman, Tudor Revival, et al.
- MPS: Hendersonville MPS
- NRHP reference No.: 00000989
- Added to NRHP: August 16, 2000

Druid Hills Historic District is a national historic district located at Hendersonville, Henderson County, North Carolina. The district encompasses 76 contributing buildings in a predominantly residential section of Hendersonville developed between 1910 and 1945. It includes notable examples of Tudor Revival and Bungalow / American Craftsman residential architecture. The planned community was designed by noted landscape architect Earle Sumner Draper.

It was listed on the National Register of Historic Places in 2000.
