= Bogorodsk-Glukhovo factory =

Textile Factory in Noginsk

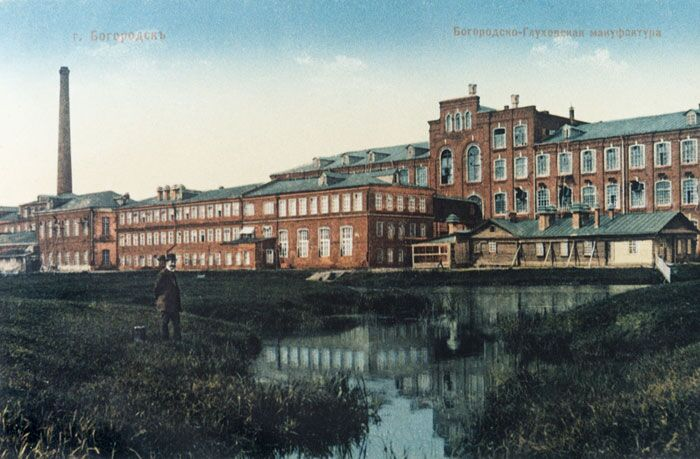
Postcard of the factory, 1911

Bogorodsk-Glukhovo factory was a textile factory founded by Savva Vasilyevich Morozov originally in Bogorodsk, now Noginsk. in 1830. His son, Zakhar Savvich Morozov, bought the village Glukhovo, two miles from the city centre, and when he inherited the factory, he moved it there. It was opened on 20 August 1847.
