= Henry Fork (South Fork Catawba River tributary) =

Stream in North Carolina, USA

Henry Fork Tributary to South Fork Catawba River
- Location of Henry Fork mouth Henry Fork (South Fork Catawba River tributary) (the United States)

Location
- Country: United States
- State: North Carolina
- County: Catawba; Burke
- City: Hickory

Physical characteristics
- Source: divide between Henry Fork and Catawba River
  - location: about 0.25 miles southeast of Propst Mountain
  - coordinates: 35°36′48″N 081°45′09″W
  - elevation: 2,750 ft (840 m)
- Mouth: South Fork Catawba River
  - location: about 3 miles southwest of Startown, North Carolina
  - coordinates: 35°38′09″N 081°18′30″W
  - elevation: 798 ft (243 m)
- Length: 39.78 mi (64.02 km)
- Basin size: 114.53 square miles (296.6 km^{2})
- Discharge
  - location: South Fork Catawba River
  - average: 181.79 cu ft/s (5.148 m^{3}/s) at mouth with South Fork Catawba River

Basin features
- Progression: northeast then southeast
- River system: Catawba River
- Tributaries
  - left: Hipp Creek; Stacy Creek; Laurel Creek; Cub Creek; Tims Creek; Longview Creek; Geitner Branch; Borger Branch; Muddy Creek
  - right: He Creek; Ivy Creek; Rock Creek; Abes Creek
- Waterbodies: unnamed reservoir
- Bridges: Watershed Road (x3), Rich Mountain Road, Bobs Knob Road, Enola Road, Old NC 18, River Road (x3), NC 18, Mountain Springs Mountain Road, Warrick Chapel Road, Miller Bridge Road, Johnson Bridge Road, Henry River Road, Old Shelby Road, S Center Street, Brookton Blvd., Sandy Ford Road, US 321

Henry Fork is a 39.78 mi (64.02 km) long 4th order tributary to South Fork Catawba River in Burke and Catawba Counties, North Carolina.

== Variant names ==
According to the Geographic Names Information System, it has also been known historically as:

- Henrixy River
- Henrys River

== Course ==
Henry Fork rises about 0.25 miles southeast of Propst Mountain in Burke County, North Carolina. Henry Fork then flows northeast into Catawba County then southeast to form South Fork Catawba River with Jacob Fork about 3 miles southwest of Startown.

== Watershed ==
Henry Fork drains 114.53 square miles (296.6 km^{2}) of area, receives about 51.1 in/year of precipitation, has a topographic wetness index of 310.54 and is about 65% forested.

== See also ==
- List of North Carolina rivers
