= Mill Village Historic District (Williamstown, Massachusetts) =

Historic district in Massachusetts, United States

- U.S. National Register of Historic Places
- U.S. Historic district
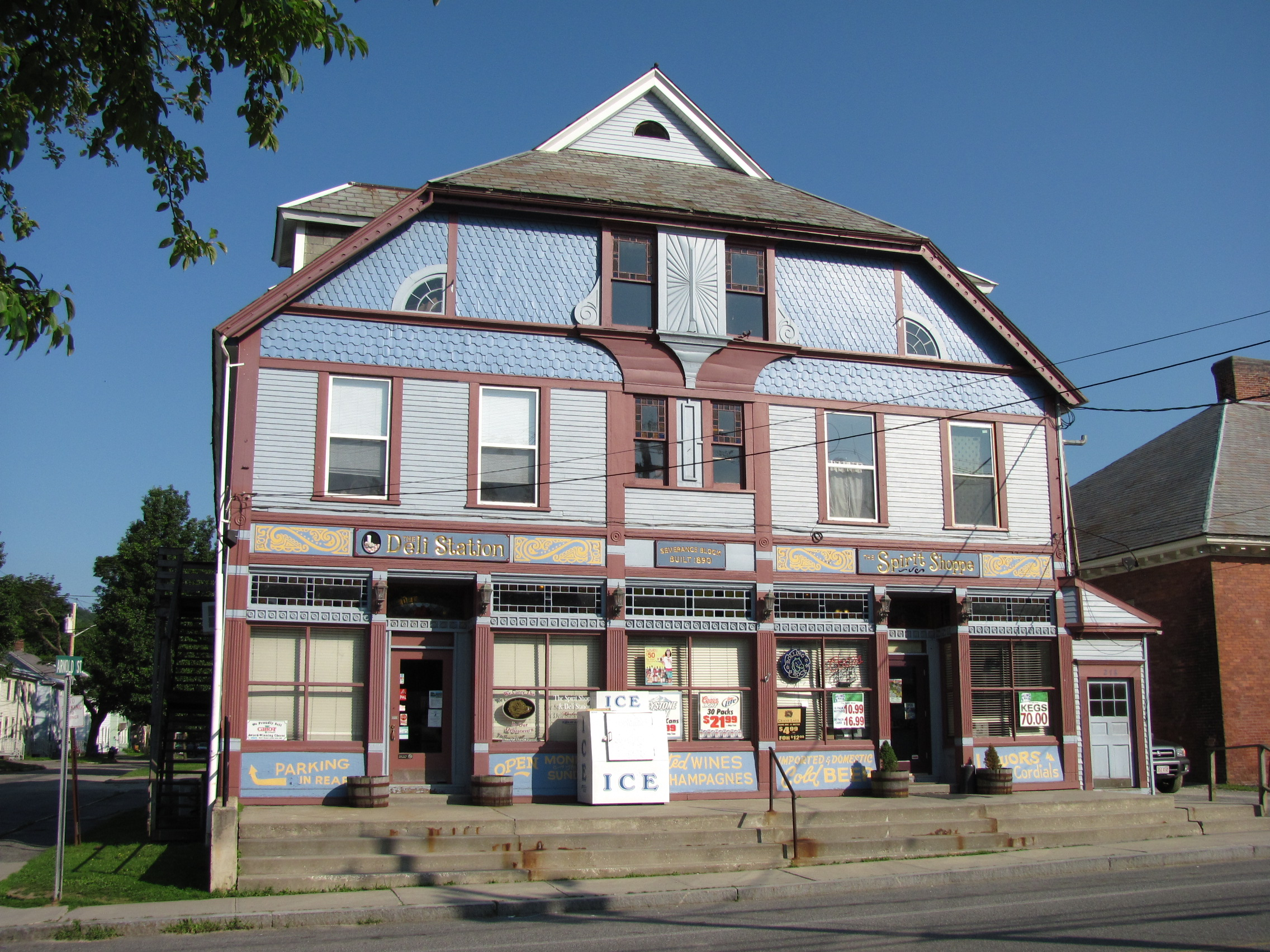
- Severance Block

- Location within Massachusetts Location within the United States
- Location: Cole Ave., Mill, Arnold, and Elm Sts. Williamstown, Massachusetts
- Coordinates: 42°43′0″N 73°11′25″W
- Area: 12.86 acres (5.20 ha)
- Built: 1865
- Architectural style: Greek Revival
- NRHP reference No.: 83003926
- Added to NRHP: October 6, 1983

The Mill Village Historic District is a historic district encompassing a well-preserved 19th century mill village in Williamstown, Massachusetts. It is located on Cole Avenue and other streets east of Cole and south of the Hoosac River, which provided the mill's power. The complex dates to the mid-19th century, and includes tenement houses, housing for supervisors and specialty personnel, as well as a surviving mill building. The village district was listed on the National Register of Historic Places in 1983.

== Description and history ==
The Station Mill village occupies about 13 acres (5.3 ha) on the east side of Cole Avenue, just south of the Hoosac River. The residential portions of the village are characterized by rows of architecturally similar buildings. Most are of wood-frame construction, either one or two stories in height, and house either one or two living units. The village was described in 1878 by a North Adams newspaper as a "model manufacturing community".

The original mill building was built in 1866 for a textile business operated by Williams College president Paul Chadbourne. Demand for workers led to a shortage of housing in the area, and a number of tenement-style double housing units were built near the mill by the company. A number of civic buildings, including a church, store, and school were also built to see to the workers' needs.

The textile business failed in 1929, and the plant was adapted for the manufacture of photographic paper in the 1930s. That business was shut down in 1989, after which the mill stood vacant. Part of the original 1866 building's roof collapsed in 2003, and it was subsequently demolished.

== See also ==
- National Register of Historic Places listings in Berkshire County, Massachusetts
