= Vladimir Korotkov (footballer, born 1941) =

Russian footballer and coach

Personal information
- Full name: Vladimir Petrovich Korotkov
- Date of birth: 27 August 1941 (age 85)
- Place of birth: Noginsk, Russian SFSR
- Height: 1.69 m (5 ft 6 1/2 in)
- Position: Forward

Team information
- Current team: FC Lokomotiv Moscow (asst to the president)

Senior career*
Years	Team	Apps	(Gls)
1963	FC Trud Noginsk		
1964	FC Spartak Moscow	0	(0)
1965	FC Shinnik Yaroslavl	42	(25)
1966–1969	FC Lokomotiv Moscow	59	(12)
1969	FC Rassvet Krasnoyarsk	4	(1)
1970–1975	FC Shinnik Yaroslavl	196	(42)

Managerial career
- 1983: FC Lokomotiv Moscow (assistant)
- 1988–1992: FC Lokomotiv Moscow (assistant)
- 1992–1995: FC Lokomotiv-d Moscow
- 1993–2008: FC Lokomotiv Moscow (director)
- 2009–: FC Lokomotiv Moscow (asst to the president)
- * Club domestic league appearances and goals

Vladimir Petrovich Korotkov (Russian: Владимир Петрович Коротков; born 27 August 1941 in Noginsk) is a Russian professional football coach and a former player. Currently he works as an assistant to the president of FC Lokomotiv Moscow.
