= Laurelwood Cemetery =

Cemetery in South Carolina, USA

- U.S. National Register of Historic Places
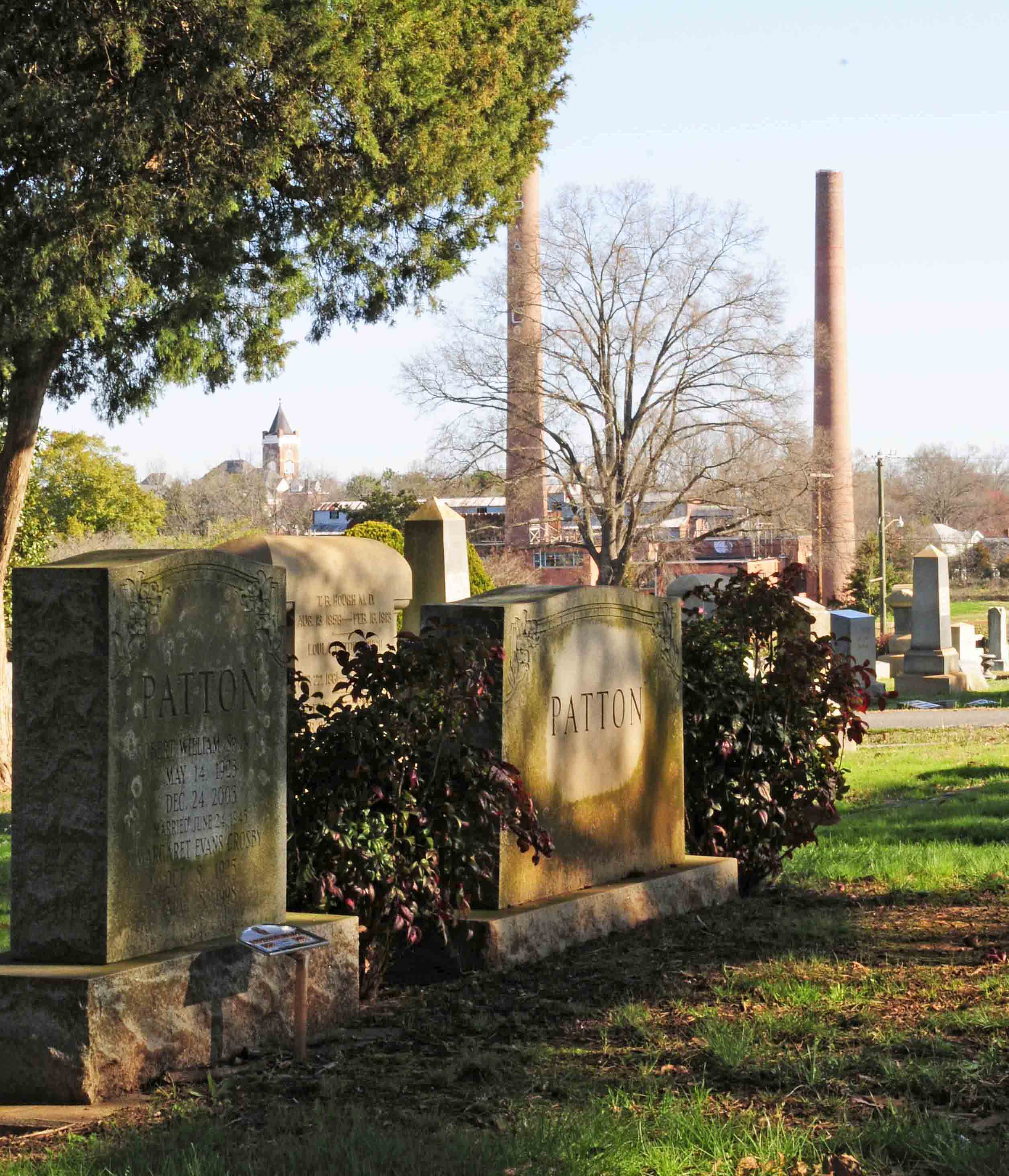
- Laurelwood Cemetery, March 2012

- Location within South Carolina Location within the United States
- Location: Bordered by Laurel, W. White, Stewart, and W. Main Sts., Rock Hill, South Carolina
- Coordinates: 34°55′55″N 81°1′59″W
- Area: 25 acres (10 ha)
- Built: 1872
- Architect: Draper, Earle S.
- NRHP reference No.: 08000746
- Added to NRHP: July 31, 2008

Laurelwood Cemetery is a historic cemetery located at Rock Hill, South Carolina. It was established in 1872, and was the first municipal cemetery of Rock Hill. It contains over 11,414 marked grave sites and includes variety of funerary art including a few raised stone tombs and a number of obelisks, table markers, spheres, and other forms. The cemetery also includes a Confederate monument and a memorial to veterans of the World War I.

It was listed on the National Register of Historic Places in 2008.
