= McAdenville, North Carolina =

- Town
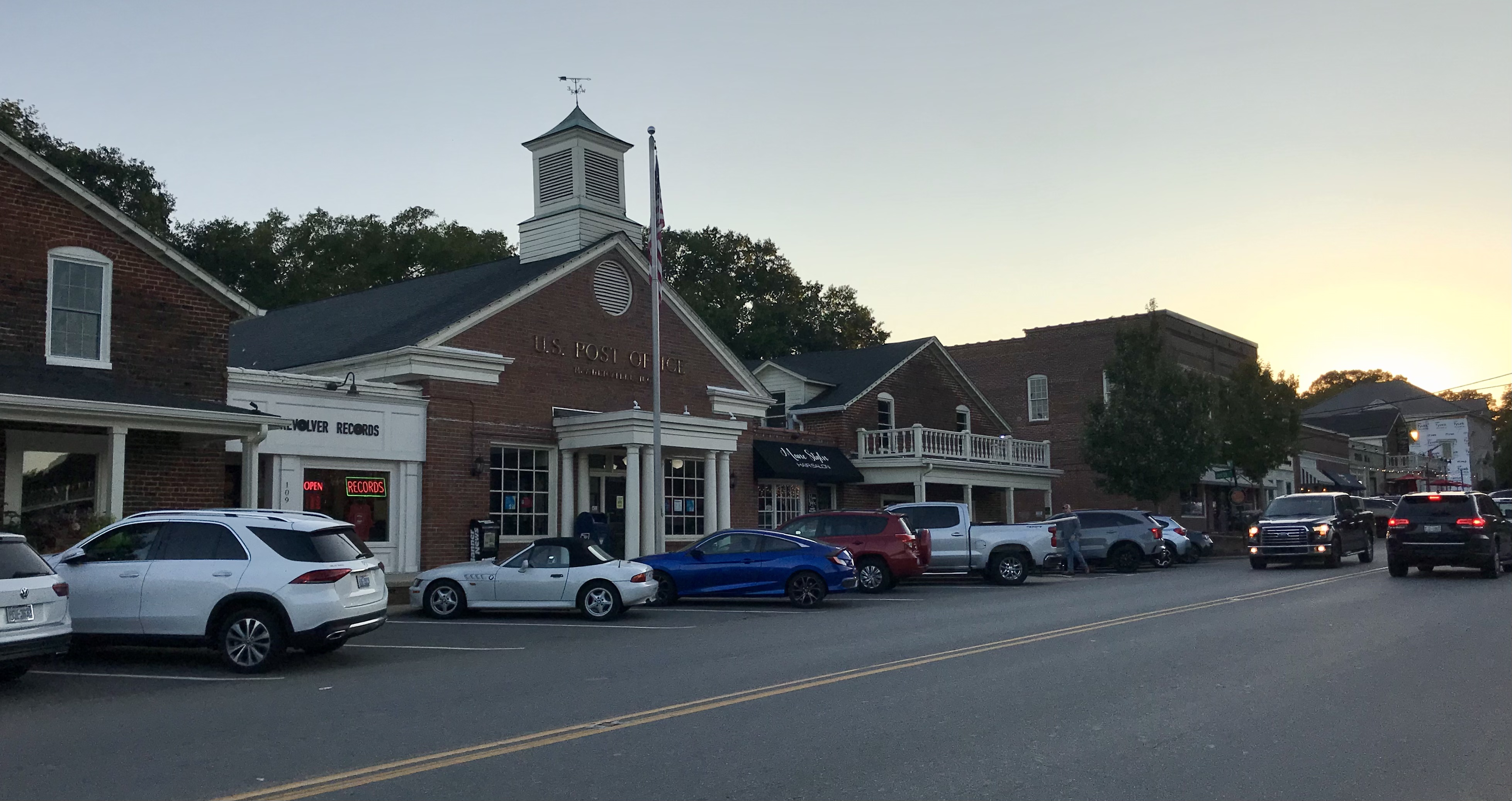
- Main Street
- Nickname: Christmas Town USA
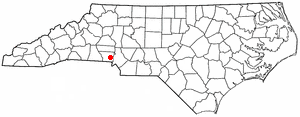
- Location of McAdenville, North Carolina
- Coordinates: 35°15′55″N 81°04′49″W
- Country: United States
- State: North Carolina
- County: Gaston

Government
  - Mayor: Jim Robinette
  - Mayor Pro Tempore: C. Reid Washam
  - Council Members: Carrie Bailey, Greg Richardson, Joe Rankin, Jay McCosh

Area
  - Total: 1.42 sq mi (3.67 km^{2})
  - Land: 1.36 sq mi (3.51 km^{2})
  - Water: 0.062 sq mi (0.16 km^{2})
- Elevation: 633 ft (193 m)

Population (2020)
  - Total: 890
  - Density: 656.5/sq mi (253.46/km^{2})
- Time zone: UTC-5 (Eastern (EST))
  - Summer (DST): UTC-4 (EDT)
- ZIP code: 28101
- Area code: 704
- FIPS code: 37-39880
- GNIS feature ID: 2406120
- Website: www.townofmcadenville.org

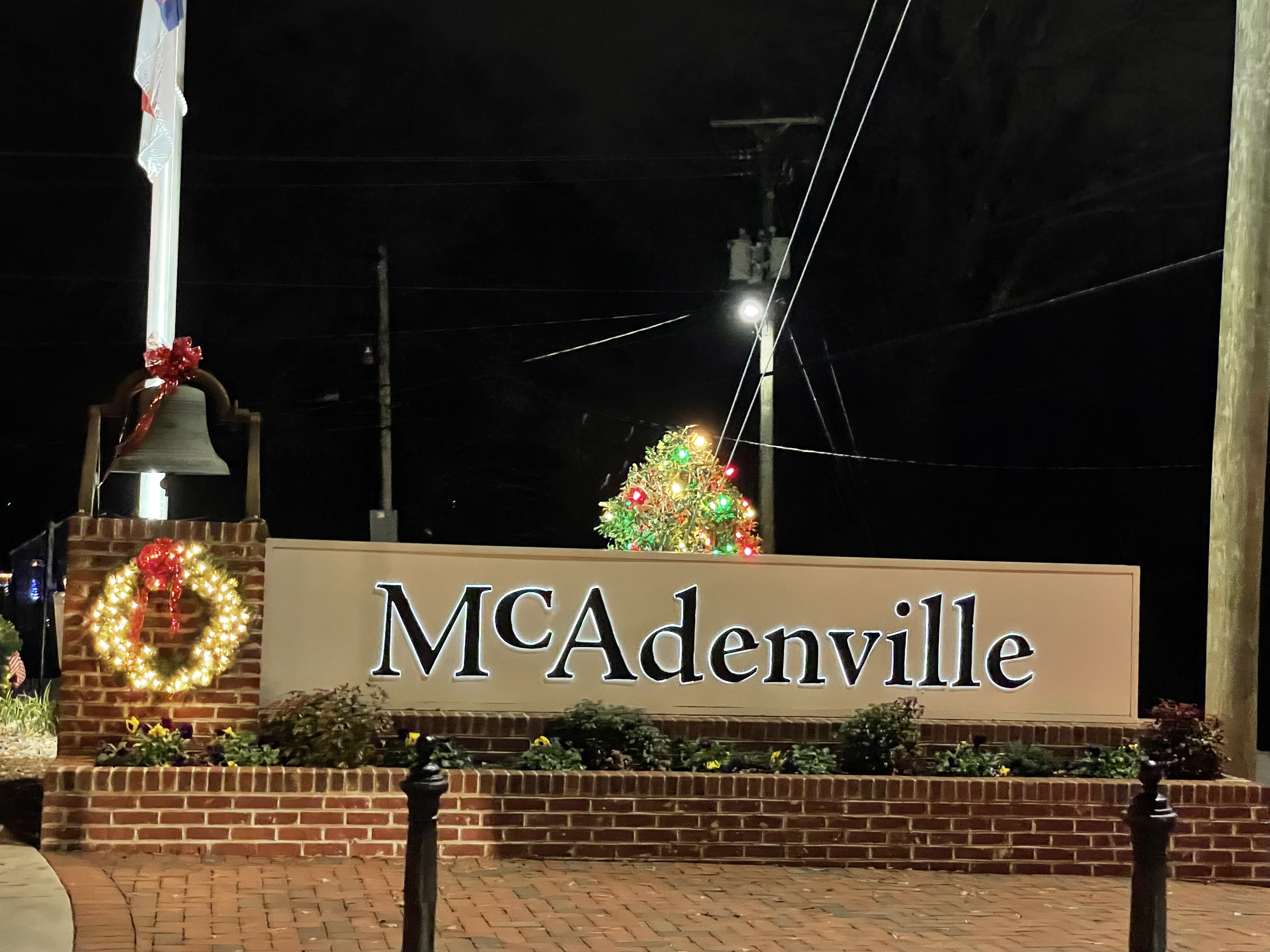
McAdenville town sign at night

McAdenville is a small town in Gaston County, North Carolina, United States. It is a suburb of Gastonia and located east of Gastonia. The population was 890 at the 2020 census.

== History ==
McAdenville was incorporated in 1881. It was named after Rufus Yancey McAden, president of McAden Mills, the town's textile mill. McAden had served in the North Carolina House of Commons from 1862 to 1867, and was Speaker of the House in 1866. He came to Charlotte in 1867 to become president of the two-year-old First National Bank.

Pharr Yarns, a yarn manufacturing company, was founded in McAdenville in 1939. It grew to become a major employer and sponsored various projects in the town during its existence. It was sold in 2019.

A Christmas tradition in the town for many years has been the decorating of the entire town in Christmas lights. The event is called Christmas Town USA. The Christmas Town USA contains 375 lit trees and over 200 wreaths attached to city light poles. The lights attract visitors from all over the country and is one of the biggest light shows in the US. Begun in 1956 with the assistance of Pharr Yarns, many trees and buildings in the town are covered in Christmas lights and some form of decoration. More than 600,000 vehicles visit each year.

The McAdenville Historic District was listed on the National Register of Historic Places in 2009.

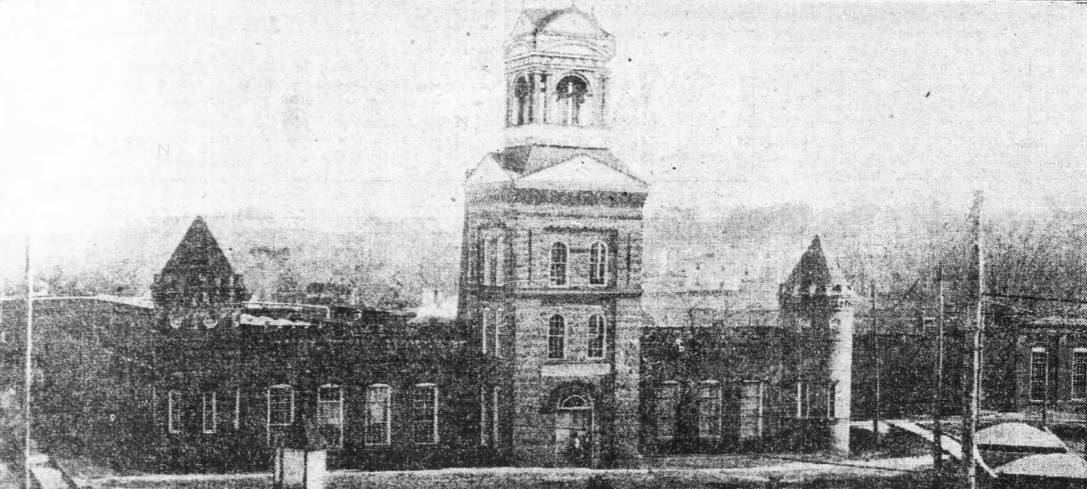
McAden Mill No. 2, 1917

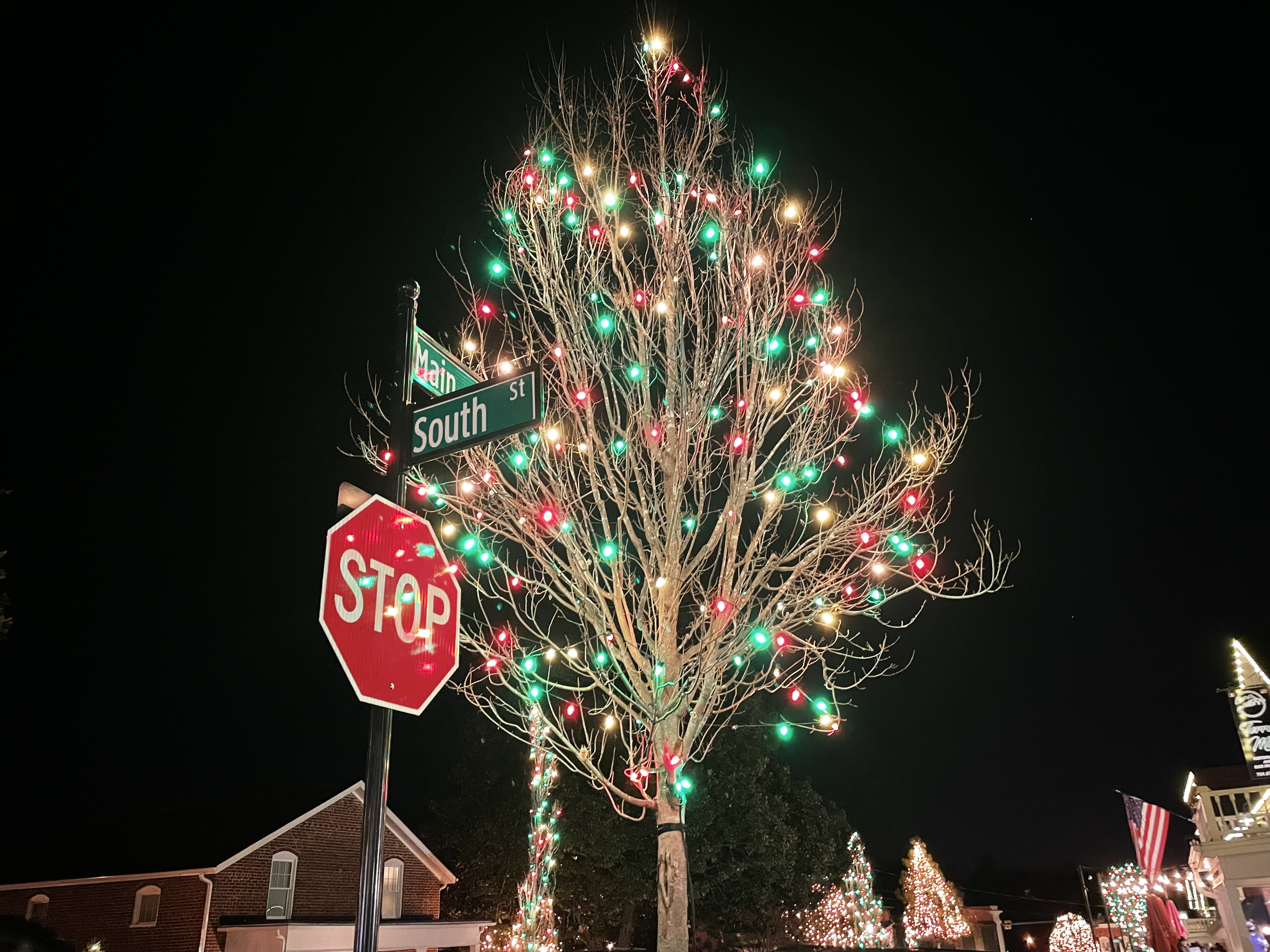
A tree decorated with Christmas light McAdenville Town

== Geography ==
McAdenville is located on the South Fork Catawba River. McAdenville Lake is formed by a dam on the South Fork in central McAdenville.

According to the United States Census Bureau, the town has a total area of 1.5 square miles (3.8 km^{2}), of which 1.4 square miles (3.6 km^{2}) is land and 0.077 square miles (0.2 km^{2}), or 4.33%, is water. The town lies in the Cramerton Watershed.

The McAdenville Historic District was listed on the National Register of Historic Places in 2009.

== Demographics ==
Historical population
Census	Pop.	Note	%±
1900	1,144		—
1910	983		−14.1%
1920	1,162		18.2%
1930	914		−21.3%
1940	887		−3.0%
1950	1,060		19.5%
1960	748		−29.4%
1970	950		27.0%
1980	947		−0.3%
1990	830		−12.4%
2000	619		−25.4%
2010	651		5.2%
2020	890		36.7%
U.S. Decennial Census

=== 2020 census ===
As of the 2020 United States census, there were 890 people, 330 households, and 274 families residing in the town.

McAdenville racial composition
Race	Number	Percentage
White (non-Hispanic)	757	85.06%
Black or African American (non-Hispanic)	33	3.71%
Asian	21	2.36%
Other/Mixed	31	3.48%
Hispanic or Latino	48	5.39%

=== 2000 census ===
As of the census of 2000, there were 619 people, 247 households, and 182 families residing in the town. The population density was 450.1 inhabitants per square mile (173.8/km^{2}). There were 282 housing units at an average density of 205.1 per square mile (79.2/km^{2}). The racial makeup of the town was 95.80% White, 1.94% African American, 0.97% Native American, 0.97% Asian, and 0.32% from two or more races.

There were 247 households, out of which 29.6% had children under the age of 18 living with them, 56.7% were married couples living together, 12.6% had a female householder with no husband present, and 26.3% were non-families. 22.7% of all households were made up of individuals, and 7.7% had someone living alone who was 65 years of age or older. The average household size was 2.51 and the average family size was 2.96.

In the town, the population was spread out, with 24.1% under the age of 18, 6.5% from 18 to 24, 25.8% from 25 to 44, 29.1% from 45 to 64, and 14.5% who were 65 years of age or older. The median age was 41 years. For every 100 females, there were 91.6 males. For every 100 females age 18 and over, there were 91.8 males.

The median income for a household in the town was $36,513, and the median income for a family was $40,750. Males had a median income of $30,781 versus $21,481 for females. The per capita income for the town was $18,130. About 6.4% of families and 6.1% of the population were below the poverty line, including 5.9% of those under age 18 and 4.7% of those age 65 or over.

== Government ==
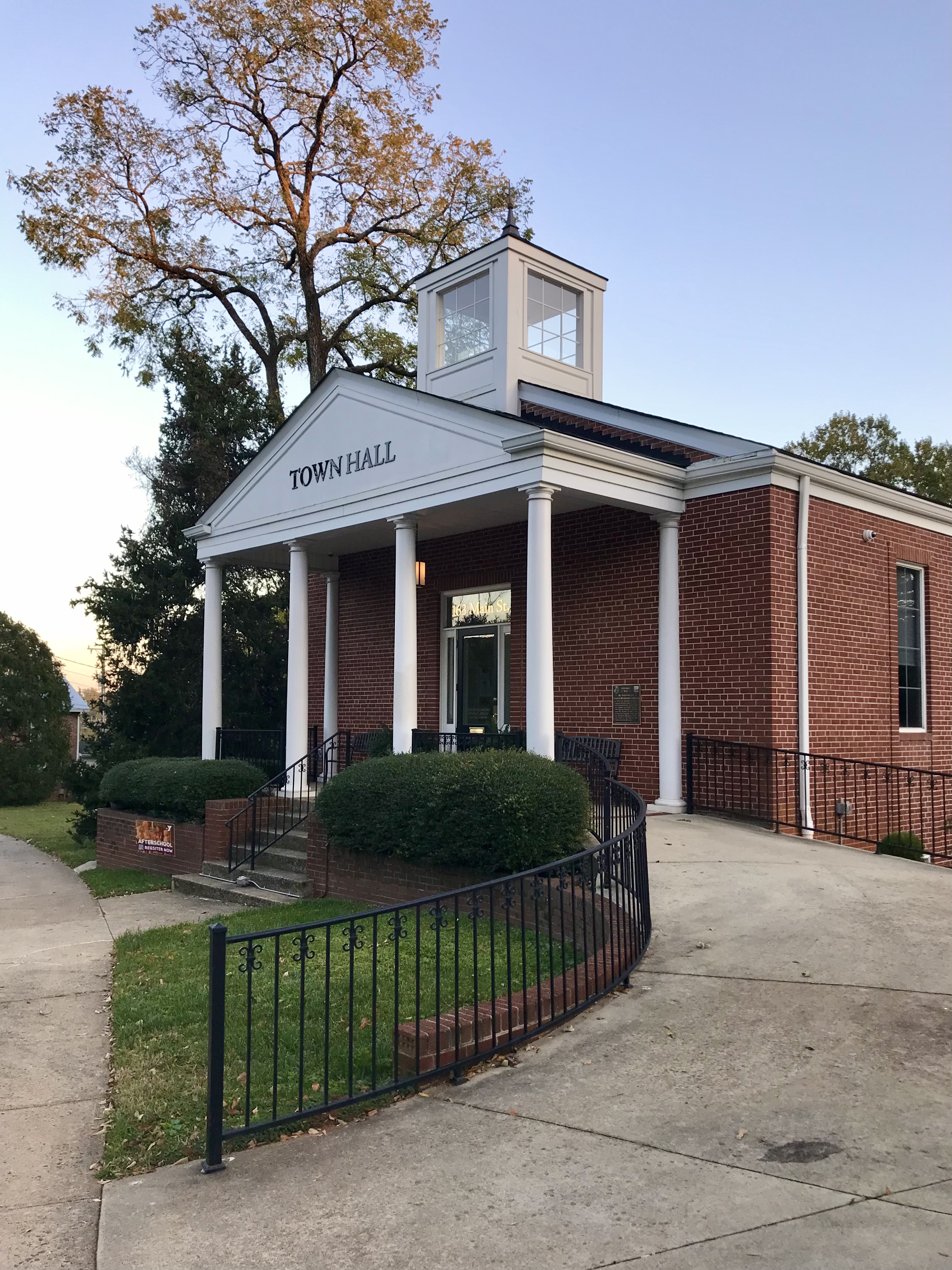
Town hall

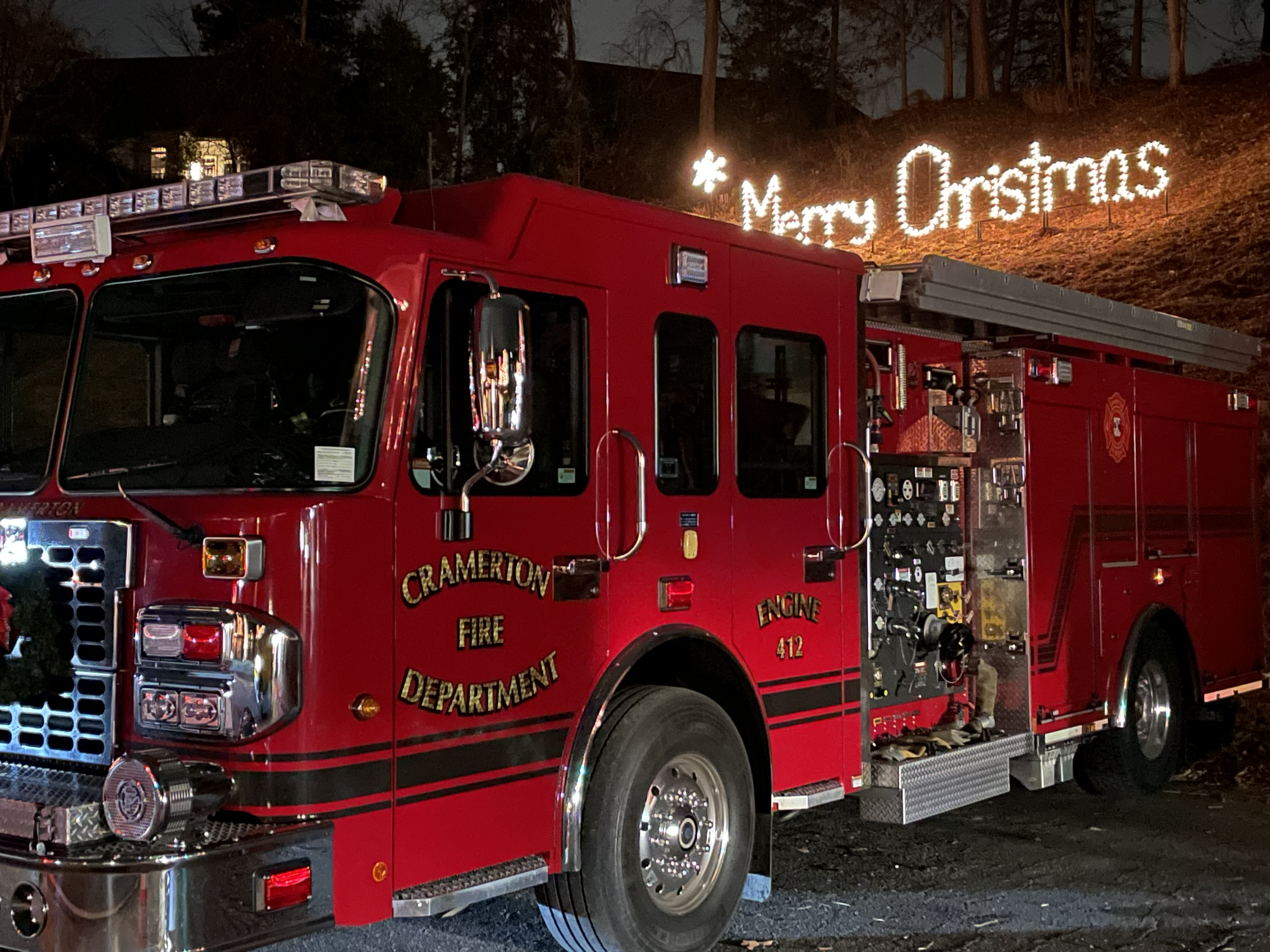
Cramerton fire truck in front of Fire Truck Station 40, McAdenville town.

McAdenville is governed by a mayor and a five-member town council. Fire protection is provided by the Cramerton Fire Department. McAdenville is in South Point Township.

The town is patrolled by the town of Cramerton Police Department and Gaston County Police Department.

== Transportation ==
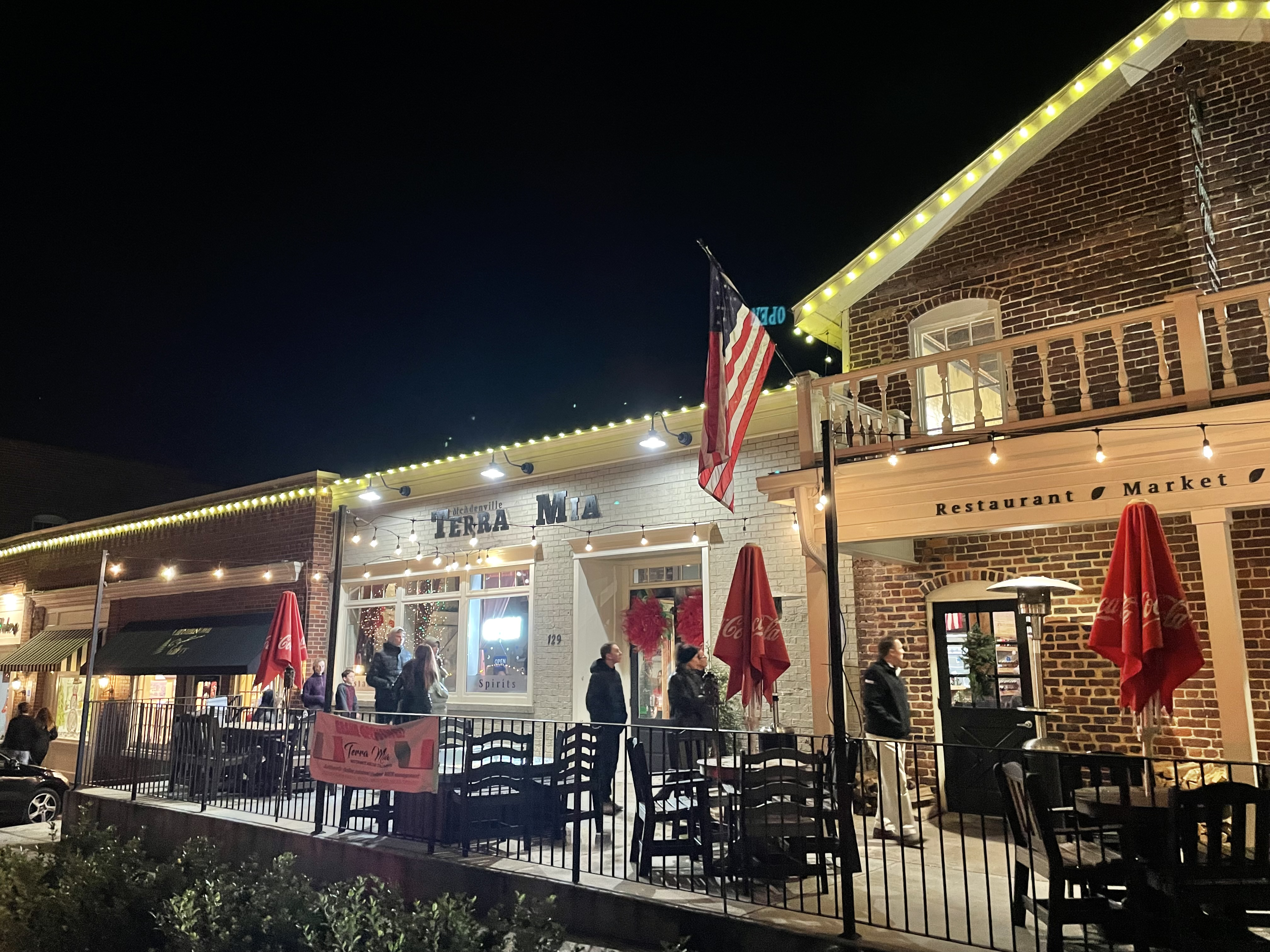
McAdenville Downtown

The primary east-west highway passing through McAdenville is Interstate 85, with access to the town from Exit 23. Other important highways include U.S. Route 29/U.S. Route 74 (Wilkinson Blvd.) and North Carolina Highway 7 (Main St./Hickory Grove Rd./Riverside Dr./McAdenville Rd.).

== Education ==
Public education in McAdenville is administered by the Gaston County Schools public school system. The only school in McAdenville is McAdenville Elementary School. Some elementary age children from the northern part of McAdenville attend Lowell Elementary School in Lowell.

Most McAdenville students in grades 6-8 attend Holbrook Middle School in Lowell, except for those in a small section of town who attend Belmont Middle School in Belmont.

High school-age students attend Stuart W. Cramer High School in Cramerton.

== Notable person ==
- George Watts (1914–1990), NFL offensive tackle, 1942 NFL champion with Washington Redskins
