= Lists of covered bridges in North America =

This is a list of lists of covered bridges in North America.

Country	Link to list for province/state	Notes
Canada	New Brunswick	Fifty-eight covered bridges exist; the vast majority have a single span.
Canada	Quebec	As of 2012, there were 82 covered bridges.
U.S.	Alabama	Eleven historic covered bridges remaining with six at their original locations.
U.S.	Arizona	One, Marreta B. Thomas Covered Bridge in Pinedale, Arizona.
U.S.	California	Eleven covered bridges reported as of 2002.
U.S.	Connecticut	Six authentic covered bridges exist of which three are historic.
U.S.	Delaware	Three authentic covered bridges of which two are historic.
U.S.	Florida	There is a historic covered bridge in Coral Springs.
U.S.	Georgia	Sixteen existing covered bridges.
U.S.	Illinois	Nine authentic covered bridges of which five are historic.
U.S.	Indiana	Ninety-eight historic covered bridges of which fourteen were built before 1870 and represent the most common truss style (Burr Arch) in the state.
U.S.	Iowa	Nineteen covered bridges were built in Iowa between 1855 and 1885; nine remain, five of which are in Madison County around Winterset.
U.S.	Kentucky	As many as 700 covered bridges existed in the past, though only 12 are known to still exist. 11 are open to the public, and one exists on private property; all are listed on the National Register of Historic Places.
U.S.	Maine	Nine covered bridges of which seven are historic.
U.S.	Maryland	Six remain as of 2015.
U.S.	Massachusetts	Twelve authentic covered bridges of which seven are historic as of 2003.
U.S.	Michigan	There is a covered bridge in Frankenmuth, Michigan. There are at least 7 others throughout the state.
U.S.	Minnesota	Twenty-three covered bridges including one on the National Register of Historic Places.
U.S.	Missouri	Four historic covered bridges, all now listed as State Historic Sites.
U.S.	New Hampshire	At one time there were about 400 covered bridges in New Hampshire. It was reported that "at the end of twentieth century there were still nearly seventy covered bridges in New Hampshire." In 2006, it was reported that there are 54 surviving bridges administered by the New Hampshire Department of Transportation, the most famous being the Cornish–Windsor Covered Bridge (1866), spanning the Connecticut River from Cornish, New Hampshire to Windsor, Vermont; this bridge was formerly the longest wooden covered bridge in the United States.
U.S.	New Jersey	New Jersey had up to 35 covered bridges at its peak; many that were destroyed or damaged in various major floods are rebuilt as metal truss bridges. Today, two covered bridges remain: Green Sergeant's Covered Bridge (19th century) and Scarborough Bridge (1959).
U.S.	New York	Twenty-four historic covered bridges identified by New York Society of Covered Bridges.
U.S.	North Carolina	Two remain, the Pisgah and Bunker Hill.
U.S.	Ohio	Forty-two remain, the second-highest of any state, down from over 4,000 at peak.
U.S.	Oregon	Fifty historic covered bridges remain in the state.
U.S.	Pennsylvania	About 219 remain, the most of any state.
U.S.	Rhode Island	Only the Swamp Meadow Covered Bridge.
U.S.	South Carolina	The only remaining covered bridge in South Carolina is Campbell's Covered Bridge in Greenville County.
U.S.	South Dakota	Only the Edgemont City Park Covered Bridge.
U.S.	Tennessee	Four remain as of 1980.
U.S.	Vermont	No other state has built and still possesses so many of the old timbered crossings in so small an area." In 1996, 106 covered bridges were reported in Vermont.
U.S.	Virginia	Six historic covered bridges remain, all still at their original locations.
U.S.	Washington	Only a few traditional covered bridges remain in Washington, and not all are publicly accessible.
U.S.	West Virginia	Seventeen historic covered bridges; the three oldest ones are also the longest.
U.S.	Wisconsin	The only remaining historic covered bridge in Wisconsin is the covered bridge in Cedarburg. There are also the Smith Rapids Covered Bridge in Park Falls built in 1991, and the Springwater Volunteer Covered Bridge built in 1997.
