= List of covered bridges in the United States =

This is a list of all covered bridges in the United States of America.

== Arizona ==
Name	Image	County	Location	Built	Length	Crosses	Ownership	Truss	Notes
Mauretta B. Thomas Pinedale Memorial Bridge		Navajo	Pinedale; 34°18.69′N 110°14.921′W	1976		Pinedale Wash	Town of Pinedale		

== Delaware ==
Name	Image	County	Location	Built	Length	Crosses	Ownership	Truss	Notes
Ashland Covered Bridge	Ashland Covered Bridge	New Castle	Ashland; 39°47′53″N 75°39′29″W	ca. 1860	52 feet (16 m)	Red Clay Creek	Delaware Dept. of Highways and Trans.	Town	
Smith's Bridge	Smith's Bridge	New Castle	Beaver Valley; 39°50′15″N 75°34′44″W	1839, 1956, rebuilt 1962 and 2002	143 feet (44 m)	Brandywine Creek	State of Delaware	Burr	Original bridge burned in 1961
Wooddale Bridge	Wooddale Bridge	New Castle	Wooddale; 39°45′57″N 75°38′14″W	ca. 1850, rebuilt 2008	60 feet (18 m)	Red Clay Creek	Delaware Dept. of Highways and Trans.	Town	

== New Jersey ==
Name	Image	County	Location	Built	Length	Crosses	Ownership	Truss	Notes
Green Sergeants Covered Bridge		Hunterdon	Stockton; 40°26′39″N 74°57′59″W	1872, 1961	84 feet (26 m)	Wickecheoke Creek	County of Hunterdon	Queen	
Scarborough Covered Bridge		Camden	Cherry Hill; 39°54′2″N 74°59′33″W	1959, renovated 1993	55 feet (17 m)	Cooper River		Town	Also called Kissing Bridge

== North Carolina ==
Name	Image	County	Location	Built	Length	Crosses	Ownership	Truss	Notes
Bunker Hill Covered Bridge	Bunker Hill Covered Bridge	Catawba	Claremont; 35°43′20″N 81°6′36″W	1895	81 feet (25 m)	Lyle Creek	Catawba County Historical Association	Haupt	Only bridge in the US using this design
Pisgah Community Covered Bridge	Pisgah Community Covered Bridge	Randolph	Pisgah; 35°32′32″N 79°53′38″W	ca. 1910	51 feet (16 m)	Upper branch of the Little River	Private	Modified queen	
Will Henry Stevens Covered Bridge		Macon	Highlands; 35°03′24″N 83°12′18″W	2008	87 feet (27 m)	Creek	Private	Town	Formerly the Bagley Bridge of Warner, New Hampshire

== Rhode Island ==
Name	Image	County	Location	Built	Length	Crosses	Ownership	Truss	Notes
Swamp Meadow Bridge		Providence	Foster; 41.79957°N 71.72943°W	1994	36 feet (11 m)	Hemlock Brook	Town of Foster	Town	Original bridge which opened in 1993 was burned by vandals.

== South Carolina ==
Name	Image	County	Location	Built	Length	Crosses	Ownership	Truss	Notes
Campbell's Covered Bridge	Campbell's Covered Bridge	Greenville	Gowensville; 35°05′9″N 82°15′51″W	1909	41 feet (12 m)	Beaver Dam Creek	County of Greenville	Howe	Rebuilt 1992

== South Dakota ==
Name	Image	County	Location	Built	Length	Crosses	Ownership	Truss	Notes
Edgemont City Park Covered Bridge		Fall River	Edgemont; 43°17′54″N 103°49′27″W	2011	120 feet (37 m)	Pond	City of Edgemont	Town	Located at the Trails, Trains & Pioneers Museum
