= Wooddale =

Wooddale may refer to several places:

- Wooddale, Newfoundland and Labrador, Canada
- Wooddale, Delaware, U.S.
  - Wooddale Bridge
  - Wooddale Historic District
- Wooddale, Wisconsin, U.S.

== See also ==
- Woodsdale (disambiguation)
- Woodvale (disambiguation)
- Wood Dale, Illinois, U.S.
  - Wood Dale station
- Wooddale Church, in Eden Prairie, Edina and Minneapolis, Minnesota, U.S.
- Wooddale High School, in Memphis, Tennessee, U.S.
