= List of bridges on the National Register of Historic Places in Delaware =

This is a list of bridges and tunnels on the National Register of Historic Places in the U.S. state of Delaware.

Name	Image	Built	Listed	Location	County	Type
Ashland Covered Bridge	Ashland Covered Bridge	ca. 1860	1973-03-20	Ashland; 39°47′53″N 75°39′29″W	New Castle	Covered
Cooch's Bridge		ca. 1726, 1777, 1791, 1834, 1884	1973-04-11	Newark	New Castle	Historic bridge not extant
Wilmington Rail Viaduct		1902, 1928, 1935	1999-11-10	Wilmington	New Castle	Through girder
Wooddale Bridge		ca. 1850	1973-04-11	Wooddale; 39°45′57″N 75°38′14″W	New Castle	Covered Recently replaced
