= Locktown–Sergeantsville Road truss bridge over Plum Brook =

- U.S. National Register of Historic Places
- New Jersey Register of Historic Places
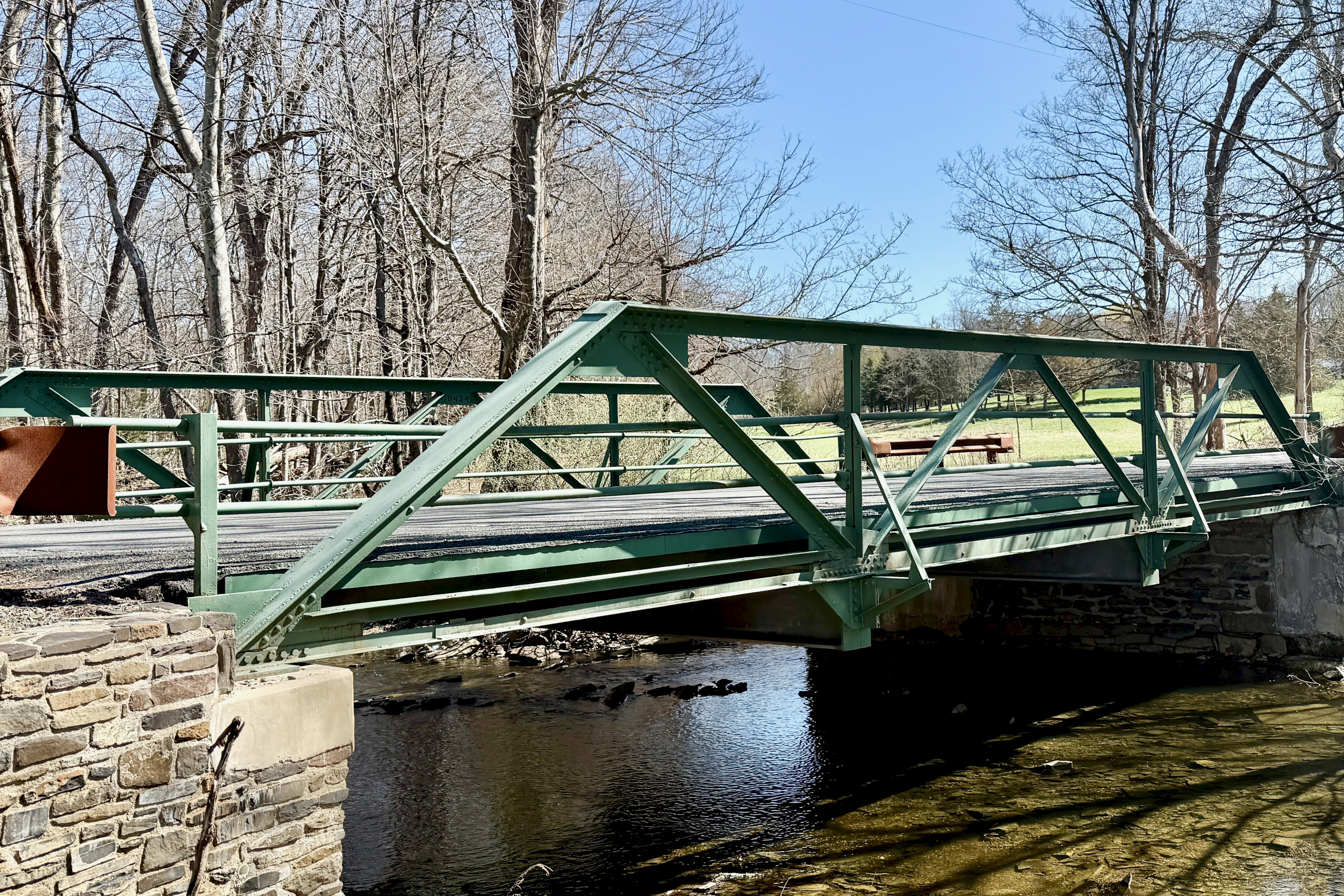

- Location within Hunterdon County, New Jersey Location within New Jersey Location within the United States
- Location: Locktown-Sergeantsville Road, Delaware Township, Hunterdon County, New Jersey
- Coordinates: 40°28′7.1″N 74°57′27.1″W
- Built: 1922
- Built by: Snook and Sons
- MPS: Historic Bridges of Delaware Township, Hunterdon County, New Jersey MPDF
- NRHP reference No.: 100011562
- NJRHP No.: 6045

Significant dates
- Added to NRHP: March 24, 2025
- Designated NJRHP: February 5, 2025

The Locktown–Sergeantsville Road truss bridge over Plum Brook is a historic Warren truss bridge located near Locktown in Delaware Township, Hunterdon County, New Jersey, United States. Built in 1922 by Snook and Sons, it was added to the National Register of Historic Places on March 24, 2025, for its significance in engineering and transportation. It was listed as part of the Historic Bridges of Delaware Township, Hunterdon County, New Jersey Multiple Property Submission (MPS).

== History and description ==
The Locktown–Sergeantsville Road bridge is one of four truss bridges that cross Plum Brook, a tributary of the Wickecheoke Creek, which flows into the Delaware River at Prallsville. The 3-panel 47-foot (14 m) long bridge was widened in 1947.

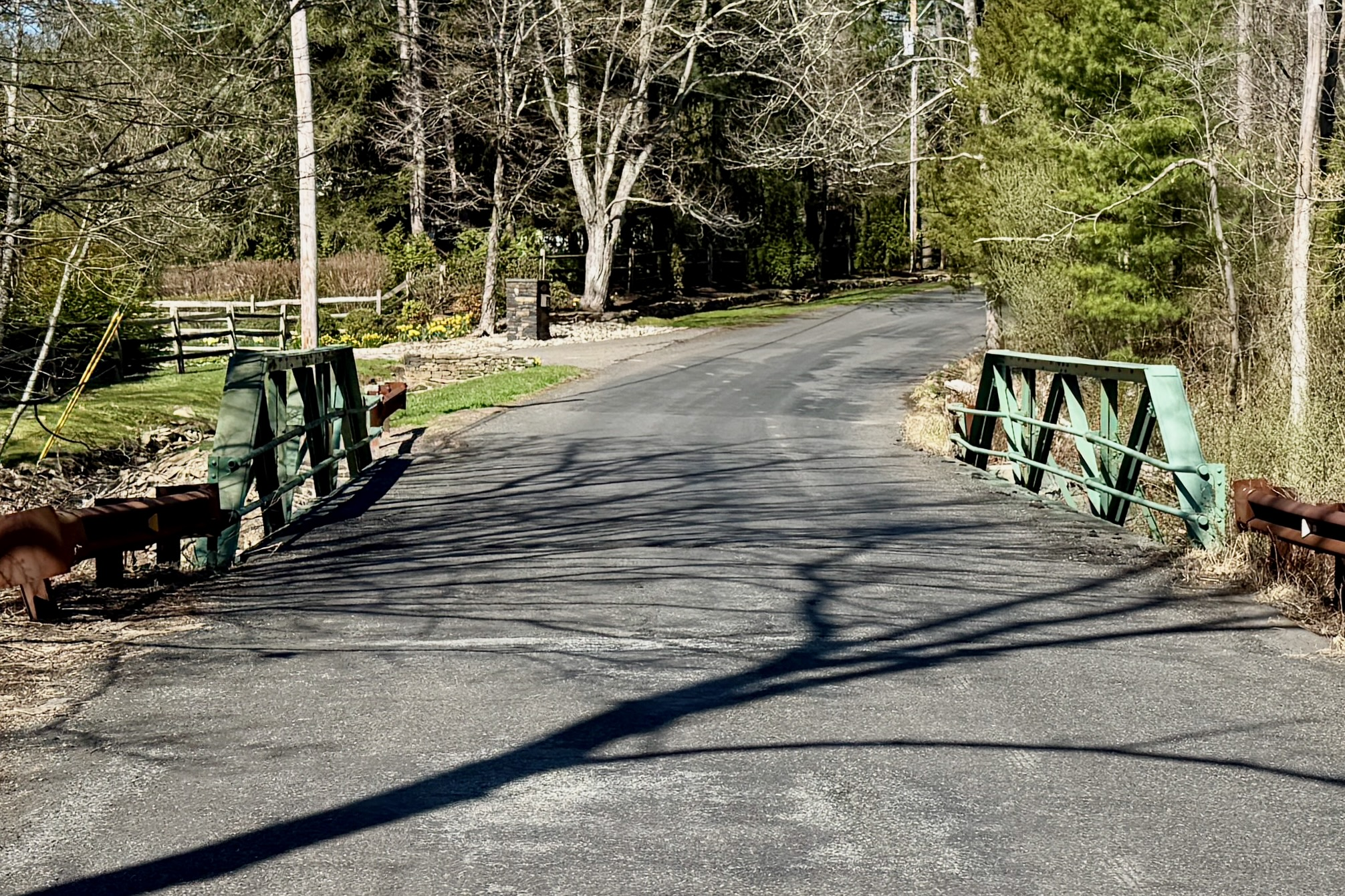
View of bridge looking west

== See also ==
- National Register of Historic Places listings in Hunterdon County, New Jersey
- List of bridges on the National Register of Historic Places in New Jersey
