= Locktown Baptist Church =

Historic church in New Jersey, United States

- U.S. National Register of Historic Places
- New Jersey Register of Historic Places
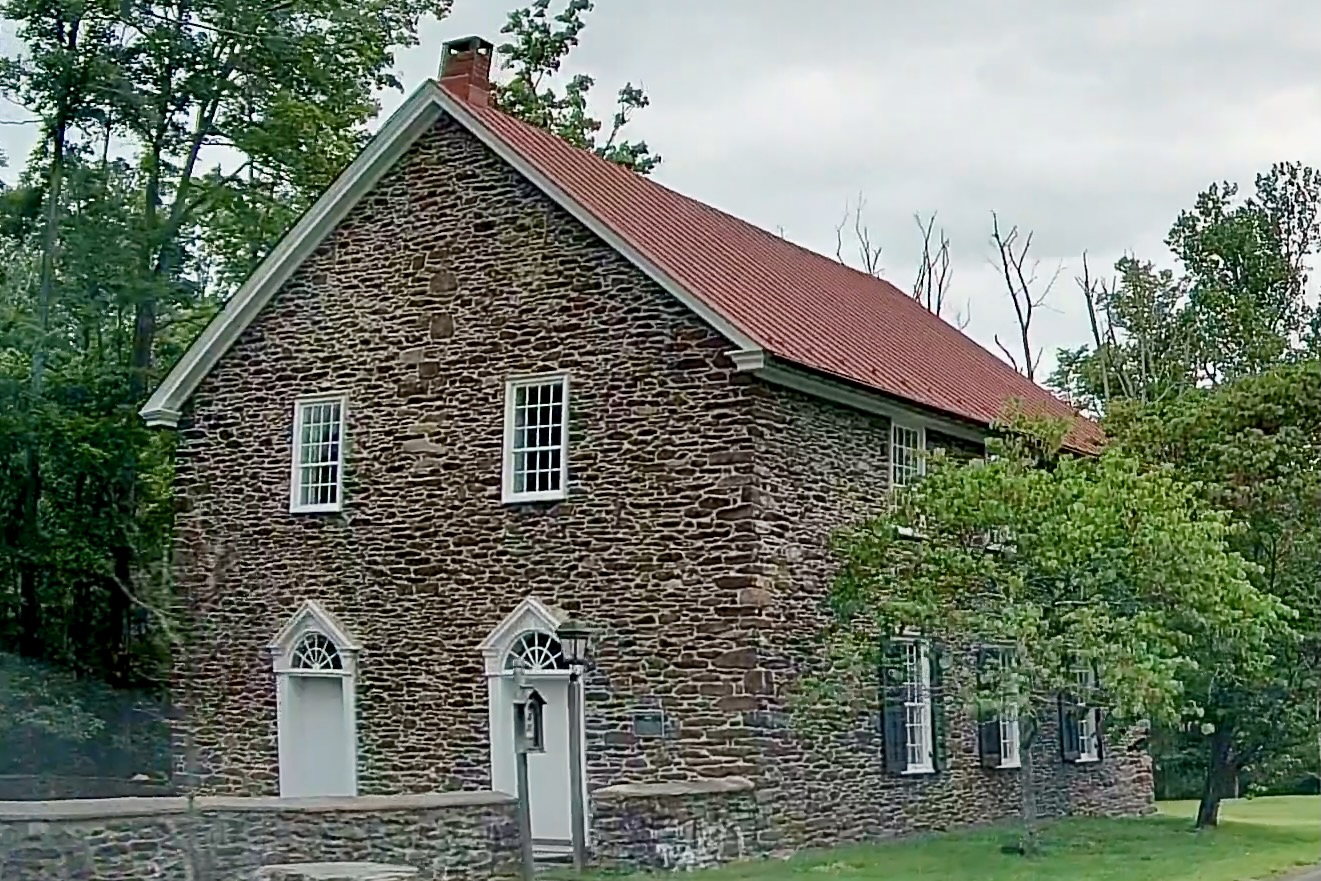

- Location within Hunterdon County, New Jersey Location within New Jersey Location within the United States
- Location: 323 Locktown-Sergeantsville Road, Locktown, New Jersey
- Nearest city: Stockton, New Jersey
- Coordinates: 40°29′5.8″N 74°58′14.1″W
- Built: 1819
- NRHP reference No.: 74001166
- NJRHP No.: 1583

Significant dates
- Added to NRHP: February 15, 1974
- Designated NJRHP: November 20, 1973

The Locktown Baptist Church is a historic stone church located at 323 Locktown-Sergeantsville Road in the Locktown section of Delaware Township in Hunterdon County, New Jersey, United States. It was built in 1819 and was added to the National Register of Historic Places on February 15, 1974, for its significance in architecture and religion.

== History and description ==
The Kingwood Baptist Congregation was organized on July 27, 1745, in Baptistown. The Locktown church was known as the Lower Church, as compared to the Baptistown church. In 1819, the congregation built this two-story fieldstone church south of the Wickecheoke Creek on land from Daniel Rittenhouse. The first pastor, David Bateman, died in 1832 and is buried under the church floor.

== See also ==
- National Register of Historic Places listings in Hunterdon County, New Jersey
