= Covered Bridge Historic District =

Historic district in New Jersey, United States

- U.S. National Register of Historic Places
- U.S. Historic district
- New Jersey Register of Historic Places
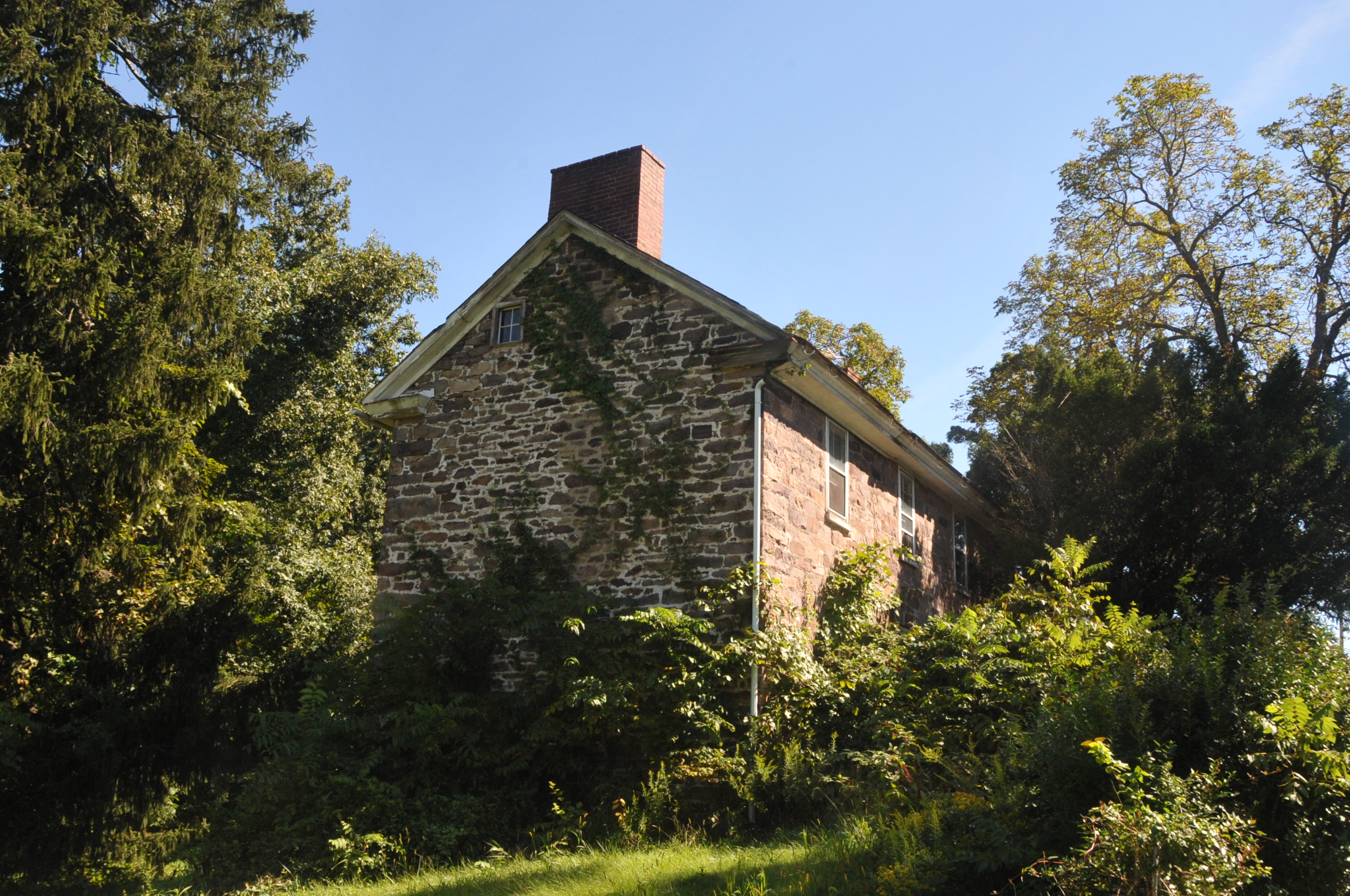
- Opdyke-Sergeant House

- Location within Hunterdon County, New Jersey Location within New Jersey Location within the United States
- Location: along County Route 604, Pine Hill Road, and Lower Creek Road, Delaware Township, New Jersey
- Coordinates: 40°26′44″N 74°57′50″W
- Area: 97 acres (39 ha)
- Architectural style: Georgian, Colonial Revival
- NRHP reference No.: 99000269
- NJRHP No.: 104

Significant dates
- Added to NRHP: March 5, 1999
- Designated NJRHP: January 19, 1999

The Covered Bridge Historic District, in Delaware Township, Hunterdon County, New Jersey, is a 97-acre (39 ha) historic district along County Route 604, Pine Hill Road, and Lower Creek Road. It was listed on the National Register of Historic Places on March 5, 1999, for its significance in architecture, settlement, and transportation. The listing included seven contributing buildings, two contributing structures, and three contributing sites.

== Description ==
It is a mill hamlet/farmstead located on Wickecheoke Creek several miles upstream from where it joins the Delaware River, at the point where the creek cuts down from the Hunterdon Plateau. It includes Green Sergeant's Covered Bridge (a covered bridge bringing County Route 604 over the creek), two other bridges, two mill sites, three houses, a schoolhouse, and a large barn complex. The site was in use probably by the 1750s.

The Opdyke-Sergeant House was built in 1754 using stone block in a Georgian style for John Opdyke and his wife Margaret. The property was sold to Charles Sergeant in 1805. The Sergeant-Reading Tenant House features Colonial Revival style.

== Gallery ==
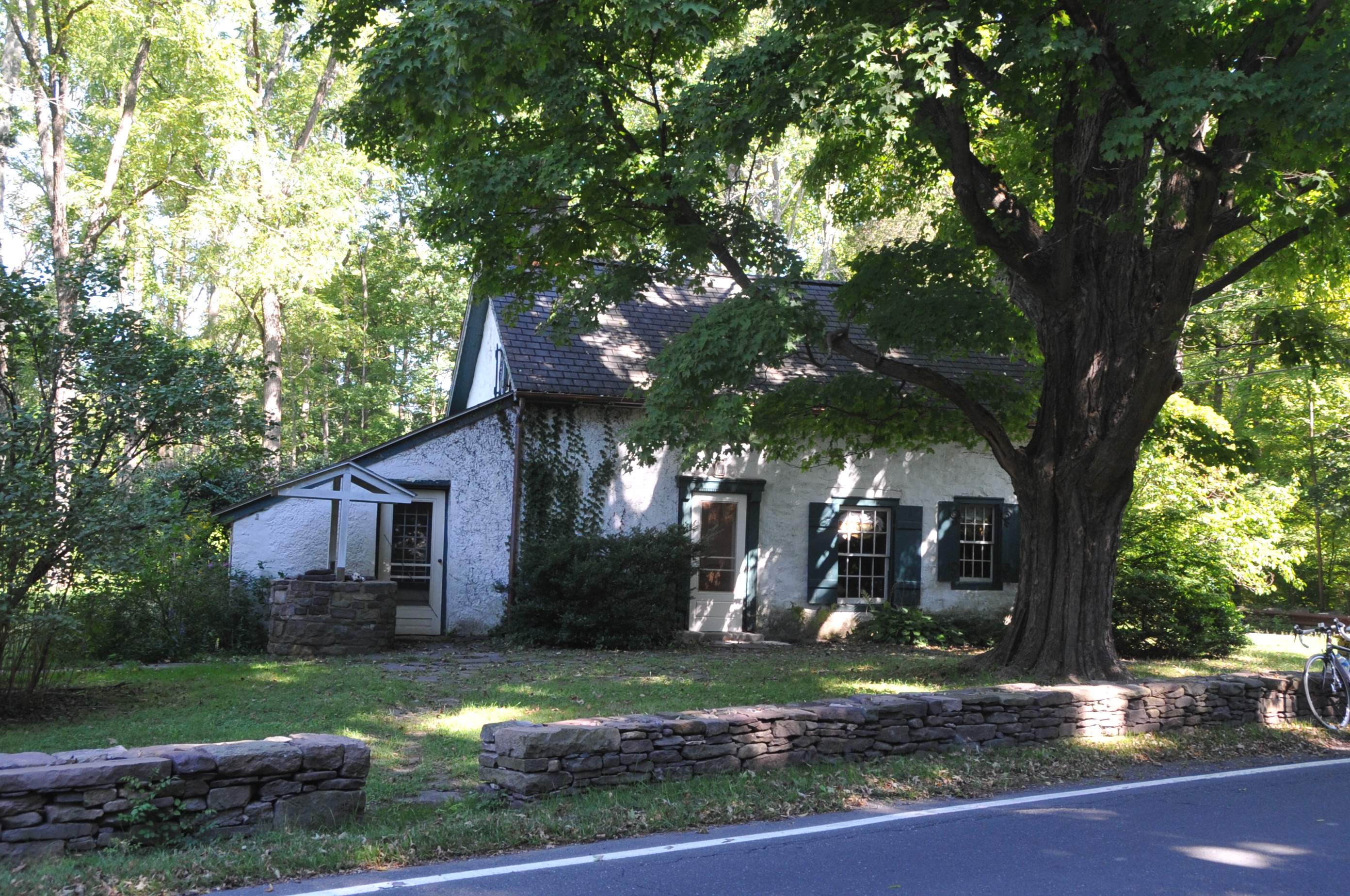
Sergeant-Reading Tenant House

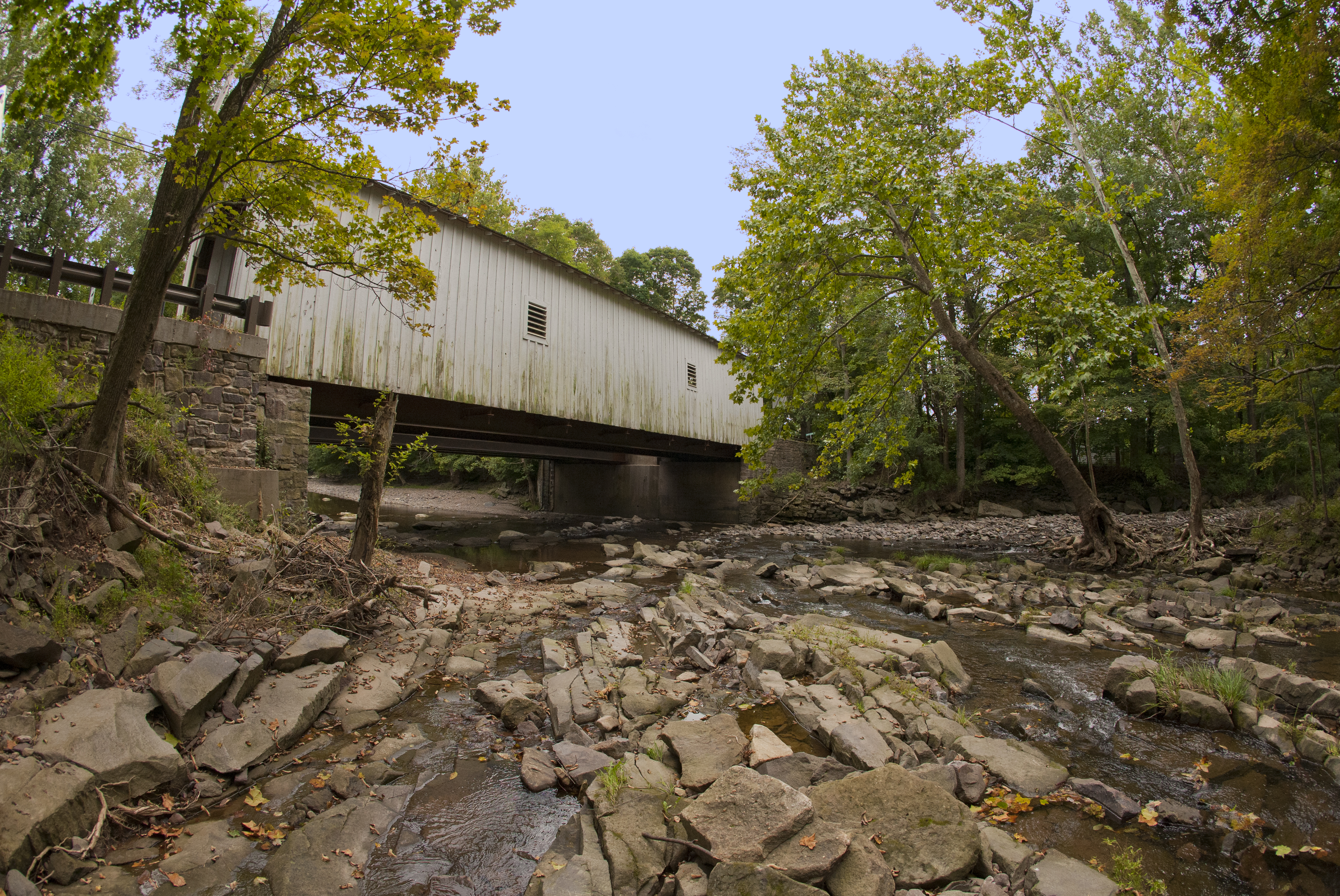
Green Sergeant's Covered Bridge
