= Cooper, New Jersey =

Cooper, New Jersey may refer to:

- Cooper, Gloucester County, New Jersey, U.S.
- Cooper, Passaic County, New Jersey, U.S.

== See also ==
- Cooper River (New Jersey), a tributary of the Delaware River, New Jersey, U.S.
