= Locktown, New Jersey =

- Unincorporated community
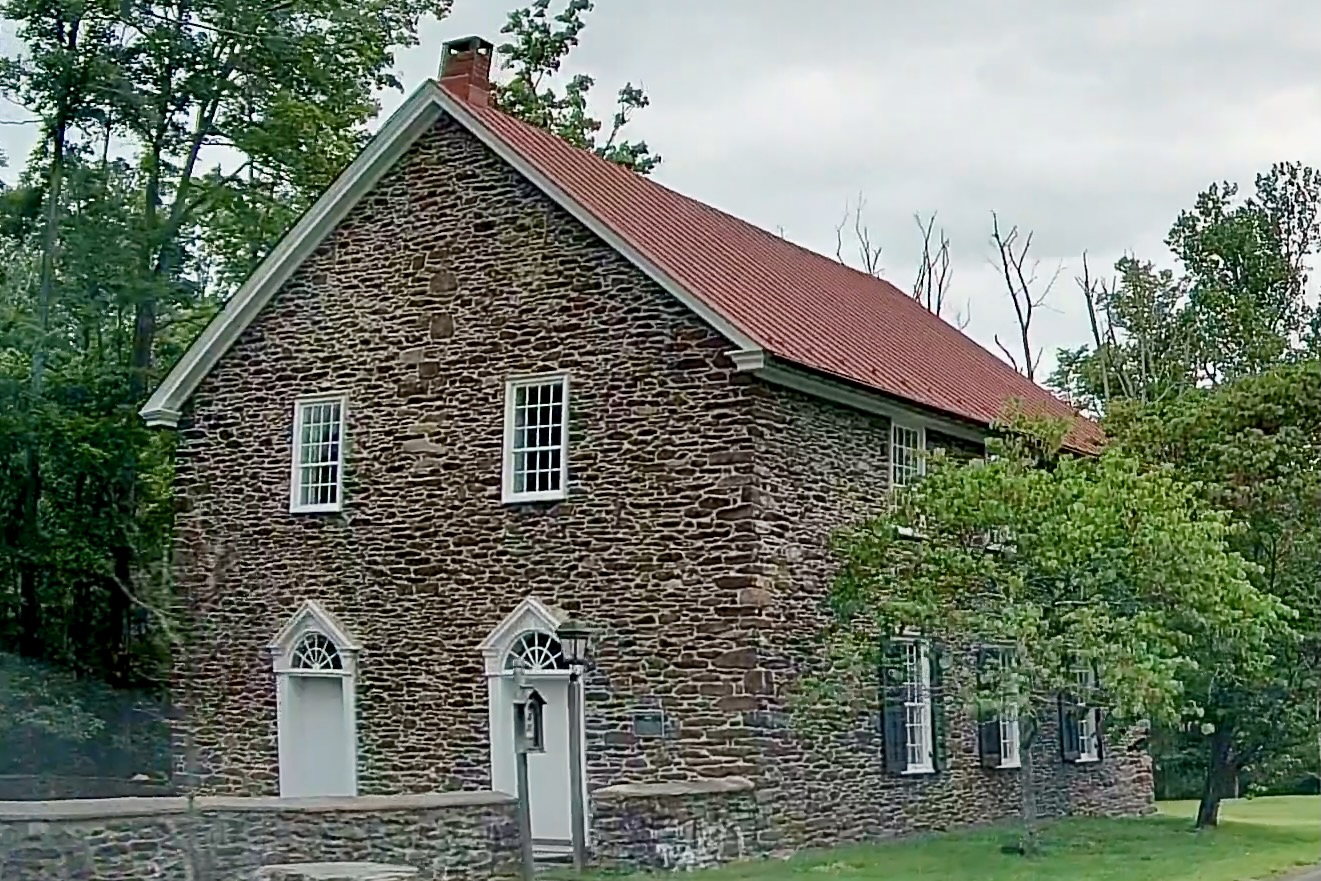
- Locktown Baptist Church, listed on the National Register of Historic Places

- Location of Locktown in Hunterdon County Inset: Location of county within the state of New Jersey Locktown (New Jersey) Locktown (the United States)
- Coordinates: 40°29′5″N 74°58′12″W
- Country: United States
- State: New Jersey
- County: Hunterdon
- Township: Delaware
- Elevation: 479 ft (146 m)
- GNIS feature ID: 877882

Locktown is an unincorporated community located within Delaware Township in Hunterdon County, New Jersey, United States. The settlement is located in the northern portion of Delaware Township near its border with Kingwood Township and the Wickecheoke Creek. The surrounding area is very forested and rural but the settlement includes some historic churches including the Locktown Baptist Church. The church was listed on the National Register of Historic Places in 1974. The nearby Locktown–Sergeantsville Road truss bridge over Plum Brook was listed on the NRHP in 2025.
