= List of bridges documented by the Historic American Engineering Record in North Carolina =

This is a list of bridges documented by the Historic American Engineering Record in the U.S. state of North Carolina.

== Bridges ==
Survey No.	Name (as assigned by HAER)	Status	Type	Built	Documented	Carries	Crosses	Location	County	Coordinates
NC-20	Boylan Avenue Bridge	Replaced	Warren truss	1913	1981	South Boylan Avenue	Seaboard Air Line Railroad	Raleigh	Wake	35°46′39″N 78°38′59″W
NC-21	Bridge No. 249	Replaced	Parker truss	1927	1983	SR 2294	Abbotts Creek	Southmont	Davidson	35°40′35″N 80°15′02″W
NC-22	Bridge No. 28	Bypassed	Warren truss	1925	1983	SR 1004	Flat River	Durham	Durham	36°07′55″N 78°49′41″W
NC-23	Person County Bridge No. 35	Bypassed	Pratt truss	1910	1983	SR 1120	South Flat River	Hurdle Mills	Person	36°15′44″N 79°00′45″W
NC-24	North Carolina Route 1334 Bridge	Replaced	Pratt truss	1928	1983	SR 1334	Deep River	Jamestown	Guilford	35°59′24″N 79°56′23″W
NC-25	North Carolina Route 1392 Bridge	Bypassed	Parker truss	1920	1983	SR 1392	Tuckaseegee River	Dillsboro	Jackson	35°23′04″N 83°17′30″W
NC-26	North Carolina Route 1412 Bridge	Demolished	Pratt truss	1912	1983	SR 1412	Leepers Creek	Laboratory	Lincoln	
NC-27	North Carolina Route 1336 Bridge	Replaced	Pratt truss	1920	1983	SR 1336	North Toe River	Burnsville	Mitchell and Yancey	35°59′34″N 82°15′28″W
NC-29	McGirt's Bridge	Replaced	Pennsylvania truss	1923	1983	US 701	Cape Fear River	Elizabethtown	Bladen	34°37′57″N 78°36′10″W
NC-30	North Carolina Route 2408 Bridge	Replaced	Warren truss	1915	1984	SR 2408	Bull Creek	Asheville	Buncombe	35°36′29″N 82°27′33″W
NC-31	Huffman Bridge	Replaced	Parker truss	1929	1984	SR 1501	Catawba River	Morganton	Burke	35°47′19″N 81°37′13″W
NC-32	North Carolina Route 126 Bridge	Replaced	Parker truss	1919	1984	NC 126	Lake James	Linville	Burke	35°44′36″N 81°53′04″W
NC-33	North Carolina Route 1006 Bridge	Demolished	Pennsylvania truss	1916	1984	SR 1006	Catawba River	Catawba	Catawba	35°45′19″N 81°05′21″W
NC-34	North Carolina Route 1116 Bridge	Replaced	Pratt truss	1920	1984	SR 1116	Jacob Fork River	Long View	Catawba	35°37′37″N 81°24′45″W
NC-36	North Carolina Route 1852 Bridge	Bypassed	Pennsylvania truss	1921	1984	SR 1852	Lake Summit	Tuxedo	Henderson	35°13′11″N 82°25′37″W
NC-37	Lake James Spillway Bridge	Demolished	Pratt truss	1919	1984		Lake James spillway	Nebo	McDowell	35°44′03″N 81°53′21″W
NC-38	Berry Hill Bridge	Replaced	Parker truss	1914	1985	SR 1761 and SR 880	Dan River	Eden, North Carolina, and Cascade, Virginia	Rockingham County, North Carolina, and Pittsylvania County, Virginia	36°32′29″N 79°36′17″W
NC-39	North Carolina Route 1417 Bridge	Abandoned	Pratt truss	1915	1983	SR 1417	Dan River	Danbury	Stokes	36°32′12″N 80°24′01″W
NC-40	Oconaluftee Bridge	Replaced	Reinforced concrete closed-spandrel arch	1921	1981	Oconaluftee Residence Road	Oconaluftee River	Cherokee	Swain	35°30′58″N 83°18′23″W
NC-41	North Carolina Route 1314 Bridge	Replaced	Parker truss	1919	1984	SR 1314	North Toe River	Relief	Mitchell and Yancey	36°02′08″N 82°17′46″W
NC-42-A	Blue Ridge Parkway, Linn Cove Viaduct	Extant	Viaduct	1983	1997	Blue Ridge Parkway	Grandfather Mountain	Asheville	Buncombe	36°05′42″N 81°48′44″W
NC-46	Bunker Hill Bridge	Extant	Haupt truss	1895	2002	Island Ford Road	Lyle Creek	Claremont	Catawba	35°43′17″N 81°06′55″W
NC-47	Core Creek Bridge	Replaced	Swing span	1935	1990	NC 101	Atlantic Intracoastal Waterway	Core Creek	Carteret	34°49′31″N 76°41′29″W
NC-49-D	Overhills, Railroad Bridge	Extant	Timber stringer	1938	2003	Atlantic Coast Line Railroad	Overhills Lake	Fayetteville	Cumberland	35°13′18″N 79°01′48″W
