= List of covered bridges in Massachusetts =

Below is a list of covered bridges in Massachusetts. As of 2003, there were thirteen authentic covered bridges in the U.S. state of Massachusetts of which seven are historic. A covered bridge is considered authentic not due to its age, but by its construction. An authentic bridge is constructed using trusses rather than other methods such as stringers, a popular choice for non-authentic covered bridges.

== Bridges ==
Name	Image	County	Location	Built	Length	Crosses	Ownership	Truss	Notes
Bissell Bridge	Bissell Bridge	Franklin	Charlemont; 42°37′57″N 72°52′10″W	1951, rebuilt 2009	94 feet (29 m)	Mill Brook	Town of Charlemont	Long through	This bridge is second covered bridge at this location, the first dating to 1880.
Burkeville Covered Bridge	Burkeville Covered Bridge	Franklin	Conway; 42°29′1″N 72°42′44″W	1870–1871, rebuilt 1999	106 feet (32 m)	South River (Deerfield River tributary)	Town of Conway	Multiple kingrod	Also called Conway Covered Bridge
Creamery Bridge		Franklin	Ashfield; 42°31′11″N 72°48′3″W	1985	40 feet (12 m)	Creamery Brook	Private	Queen	Despite being on private land, the bridge is open to the public and houses a knickknack shop.
Dummerston/Vermont Bridge	Dummerston/Vermont Bridge	Worcester	Sturbridge; 42°6′30″N 72°5′55″W	1951	55 feet (17 m)	Arm of Quinebaug River	Old Sturbridge Village	Town	Also called Taft Bridge; located in Dummerston, Vermont prior to 1951
Quinebaug River Bridge		Worcester	Sturbridge; 42°6′24″N 72°5′40″W	1930s, covered in 1953	33 feet (10 m)	Quinebaug River	Old Sturbridge Village	Burr	Until a flood in 1955 it served as the main entrance to Old Sturbridge Village.
Goodrich Bridge	Goodrich Bridge	Hampden	Westfield; 42°7′22″N 72°47′10″W	1965	40 feet (12 m)	Pond	Stanley Park	Town	It carries pedestrian traffic across the Duck Pond, a spring-fed pond that is located in the center of Stanley Park.
Grays Sugarhouse Bridge		Franklin	Ashfield; 42°32′43″N 72°46′50″W	1994	20 feet (6.1 m)	Tributary of Bear River	Private	King	It was designed by private contractor and Scoutmaster Dwight Scott in 1994 and built with the assistance of his Boy Scout troop.
Green River Pumping Station Bridge	Green River Pumping Station Bridge	Franklin	Greenfield; 42°38′47″N 72°37′13″W	1972	94 feet (29 m)	Green River	State of Massachusetts	Howe	Also called Eunice Williams Bridge
Old Covered Bridge	Old Covered Bridge	Berkshire	Sheffield; 42°7′26″N 73°21′17″W	1837–1838, 1854, rebuilt 1998	93 feet (28 m)	Housatonic River	Town of Sheffield	Town	Also called Upper Sheffield/Sheffield Bridge; original bridge burned in 1994
Sawyer Pond Bridge		Essex	Magnolia; 42°35′29″N 70°43′8″W	1983	40 feet (12 m)	Sawyer Pond	Private	Town	
Arthur A. Smith Covered Bridge	Arthur A. Smith Covered Bridge	Franklin	Colrain; 42°40′12″N 72°43′9″W	1868, 1870, 1896, rebuilt 2006	98 feet (30 m)	North River	Town of Colrain	Burr	Originally erected further downstream about 1870, the bridge was moved to the Lyonsville Road crossing of the East Branch of the North River in 1886
Ware-Hardwick Covered Bridge	Ware-Hardwick Covered Bridge	Hampshire and Worcester	Hardwick, Ware; 42°18′37″N 72°12′45″W	1886, rebuilt 1986	137 feet (42 m)	Ware River	Towns of Ware and Hardwick	Town	Also called Gilbertville/Ware Bridge
Chester/Charles H. Waterous Bridge	Chester/Charles H. Waterous Bridge	Middlesex	East Pepperell; 42°40′10″N 71°34′30″W	1848, rebuilt 1962 and 2010	108 feet (33 m)	Nashua River	Town of Pepperell	Pratt variation	Also called Nehemiah Jewett's Bridge and Pepperell Bridge

== See also ==
- List of bridges on the National Register of Historic Places in Massachusetts
- List of covered bridges in the United States
- World Guide to Covered Bridges
