= Hopkins Pond (park) =

American park in Haddonfield, New Jersey

Hopkins Pond is an American park in Haddonfield, New Jersey.

The park includes Hopkins Pond, Driscoll Pond, and the surrounding land, maintained by the Camden County Parks Commission.

== History ==
In 1789, John Estaugh Hopkins built a dam on a tributary of the Cooper River to power a gristmill, creating Hopkins Pond.

In 1922, James Lane Pennypacker wrote a poem about the pond, titled Hopkins Pond.

In 1925, a ten-year-old boy slipped on a log and died in Hopkins Pond.

In 1927, Hopkins Pond was closed to swimming because of pollution.

In 1969, the dam at Hopkins Pond was reconstructed.

Hopkins Pond has had harmful algal blooms on and off since at least 2013. Storm water runoff, impervious surfaces, fertilizer runoff, and water pollutants have all contributed to the issue. Camden County installed an aeration system and a transducer to produce ultrasonic sounds to disrupt algae. In July 2020, scientists with the New Jersey Department of Environmental Protection tested the pond and found high levels of microcystis, a type of bacteria that creates algal blooms.

In 2015, a group of residents organized a clean up of the park after years of litter and natural decay.
