= Woodsdale =

Woodsdale may refer to several places:

- Woodsdale, Tasmania, Australia
- Woodsdale, British Columbia, Canada, see List of communities in British Columbia § Communities
- Woodsdale, Kansas, U.S.
- Woodsdale, North Carolina, U.S.
- Woodsdale, Ohio, U.S.

== See also ==
- Wooddale (disambiguation)
