= Gowensville, South Carolina =

Unincorporated community in South Carolina, US

Coordinates: 35°06′53″N 82°13′30″W

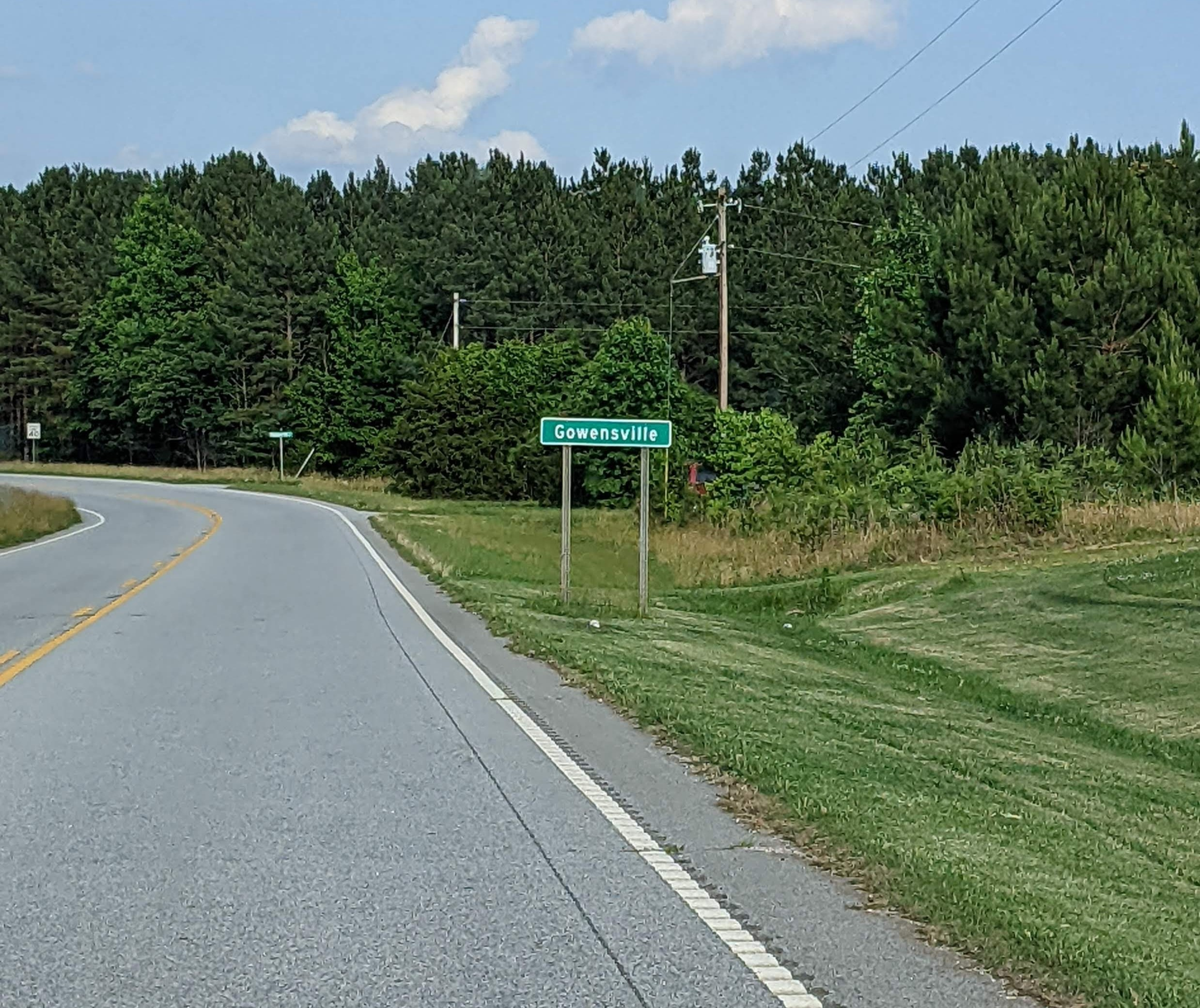
A road sign denoting the western boundary of Gowensville on South Carolina Highway 11

Gowensville is an unincorporated community in Greenville County, South Carolina, United States. The community sits along the Cherokee Foothills Scenic Highway and South Carolina Highway 14, flanking the Spartanburg County border to its east.

== History ==
In 1780, during the American Revolutionary War, a skirmish between Loyalist and Patriot forces occurred at Gowen's Fort, named for soldier John "Buck" Gowen, the namesake of the town of Gowensville. A band of Loyalists and Chickamauga Cherokee, commanded by Captain William Bates, approached the area in an attempt to siege the Patriot stronghold. Despite their strong resistance, Patriot forces succumbed to a lack of ammunition and were forced to surrender. Bates initially promised to protect those within the fort from the Indian fighters, but upon their exit, Bates gave the command for all of his soldiers to kill the resistance. The number of deceased is unknown.

Gowensville is home to Campbell's Covered Bridge, the last covered bridge in the state of South Carolina. The locale is considered part of the informal region known as the "Dark Corner", which represented a safe haven for political dissenters and moonshiners in South Carolina throughout the 1800s.
