= Malcolm Wells =

American architect

Malcolm Wells (March 11, 1926 – November 27, 2009) was an American architect who is regarded as "the father of modern earth-sheltered architecture." Wells lived on Cape Cod, Massachusetts in a modern earth-sheltered building of his own design. Wells was also a writer, illustrator, draftsman, lecturer, cartoonist, columnist, and solar energy consultant.

Wells retired from architecture in June 2004, but continued his advocacy for underground living to the end of his life.

Wells' work in architecture and design began in 1953. After 10 years "spent spreading corporate asphalt on America in the name of architecture," he began to feel that the Earth's surface was "made for living plants, not industrial plants;" and went into underground architecture. This was reflected in his semi-underground offices at the corner of East Cuthbert Blvd and North Park Drive and at 6 Dale Avenue in Cherry Hill, New Jersey, adjacent to the Cooper River. His interests were in energy efficiency, aesthetics, land preservation and restoration "A Regeneration-based Checklist for Design and Construction", and durability of materials.

Wells' books have sold over 120,000 copies.

Wells died Friday, November 27, 2009. He left behind his wife Karen North Wells and son John Wells.

== Bibliography ==
- How to buy solar heating ... without getting burnt! (1978)
- The Children's Solar Energy Book (1982)
- Underground Designs (1981)
- Gentle Architecture (1981)
- Classic Architectural Birdhouses and Feeders (1988)
- Architects Sketchbook of Underground Buildings: Drawings and Photographs (1990)
- How to Build an Underground House (1991)
- Infra Structures (1994)
- Passive Solar Energy: The Homeowner's Guide to Natural Heating and Cooling (with Bruce Anderson) (1996)
- Sandtiquity (with Kappy Wells, Connie Simo) (1999)
- Designing Your Natural House (with Charles G. Woods) (1999)
- Recovering America: A More Gentle Way to Build (2001)
- A Tiny Underground House
- Bipad (1995)
- Underground Plans Book (1980)
- Liquid Gold: The Lore and Logic of Using Urine to Grow Plants (2007)
