= Woodvale =

Woodvale may refer to:

== Places ==
=== Australia ===
- Woodvale, Victoria
- Woodvale, Western Australia

=== Canada ===
- Woodvale, Edmonton, Alberta, Canada
- Woodvale, Nova Scotia
- Woodvale, Prince Edward Island

=== United Kingdom ===
- Woodvale, Belfast, a ward of Belfast, Northern Ireland
  - Belfast Woodvale (Northern Ireland Parliament constituency)
  - Belfast Woodvale (UK Parliament constituency), a constituency from 1918 to 1922
- Woodvale, Merseyside, England
  - RAF Woodvale, a Royal Air Force airfield

=== United States ===
- Woodvale Historic District, Pennsylvania, United States

== Other uses ==
- Woodvale F.C. (Northern Ireland), a football club in Belfast, Northern Ireland
- Woodvale F.C. (Scotland), a former association football club from Thornliebank, Renfrewshire, Scotland, that existed from 1883 to 1889.
- Woodvale, a codename for Folklore (Taylor Swift album)
