= Prallsville, New Jersey =

Populated place in Hunterdon County, New Jersey, US

- Unincorporated community
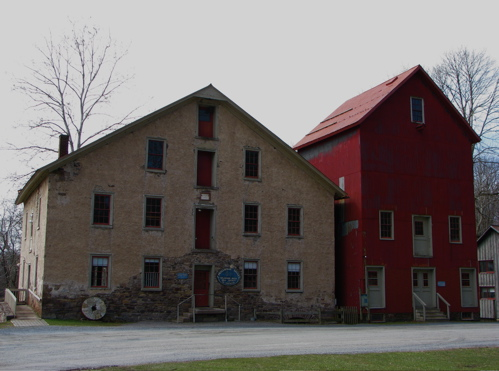
- Mill in Prallsville

- Location of Prallsville in Hunterdon County Inset: Location of county within the state of New Jersey Prallsville, New Jersey (New Jersey) Prallsville, New Jersey (the United States)
- Coordinates: 40°24′42″N 74°59′12″W
- Country: United States
- State: New Jersey
- County: Hunterdon
- Borough and Township: Stockton and Delaware
- Elevation: 85 ft (26 m)
- GNIS feature ID: 879475

Prallsville is an unincorporated community located along New Jersey Route 29 by the border of Stockton and Delaware Township in Hunterdon County, New Jersey. The Delaware River and Wickecheoke Creek border the community. The Prallsville District was listed on the National Register of Historic Places in 1979.

== History ==
The feeder canal for the Delaware and Raritan Canal, which runs along the Delaware River, was built through the community in the 1830s. Later, in the 1850s, the Belvidere-Delaware Railroad was built along the canal and a station built here.

== Historic district ==
- Prallsville District
- U.S. National Register of Historic Places
- U.S. Historic district
- New Jersey Register of Historic Places
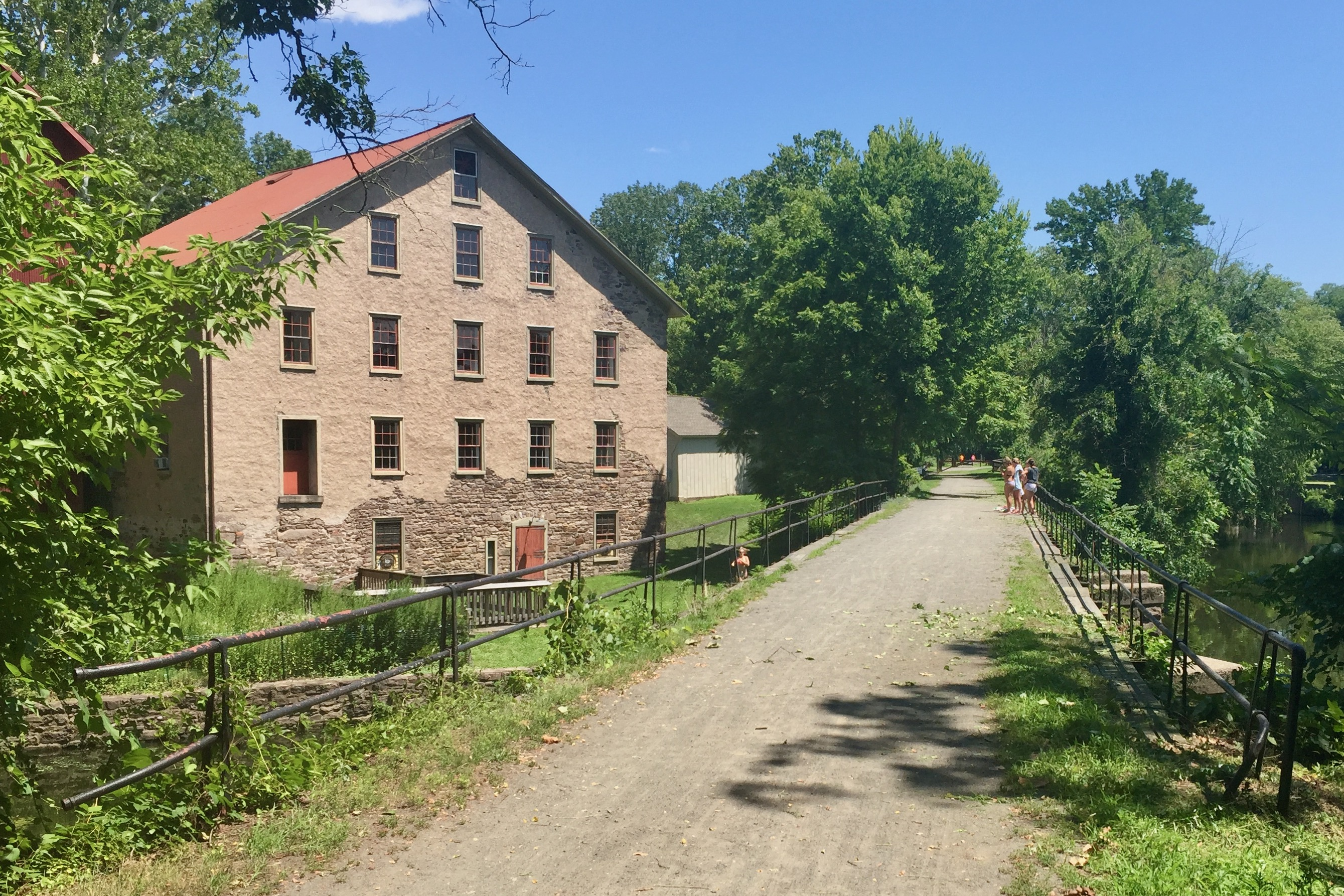
- Mill along the Feeder Canal of the Delaware and Raritan Canal
- Location: NJ Route 29, Delaware River and Wickecheoke Creek
- Area: 17 acres (6.9 ha)
- Built: 1790
- Architectural style: Greek Revival
- NRHP reference No.: 79001498
- NJRHP No.: 1629

Significant dates
- Added to NRHP: June 27, 1979
- Designated NJRHP: August 16, 1976

The Prallsville District is a 17-acre (6.9 ha) historic district encompassing the village. It was added to the National Register of Historic Places on June 27, 1979 for its significance in industry. It includes 15 contributing buildings and 2 contributing structures. The district is also known as Prallsville Mills after John Prall Jr. who bought them in 1794.

The area is part of the Delaware and Raritan Canal State Park and serves as open-air museum.

== Gallery ==
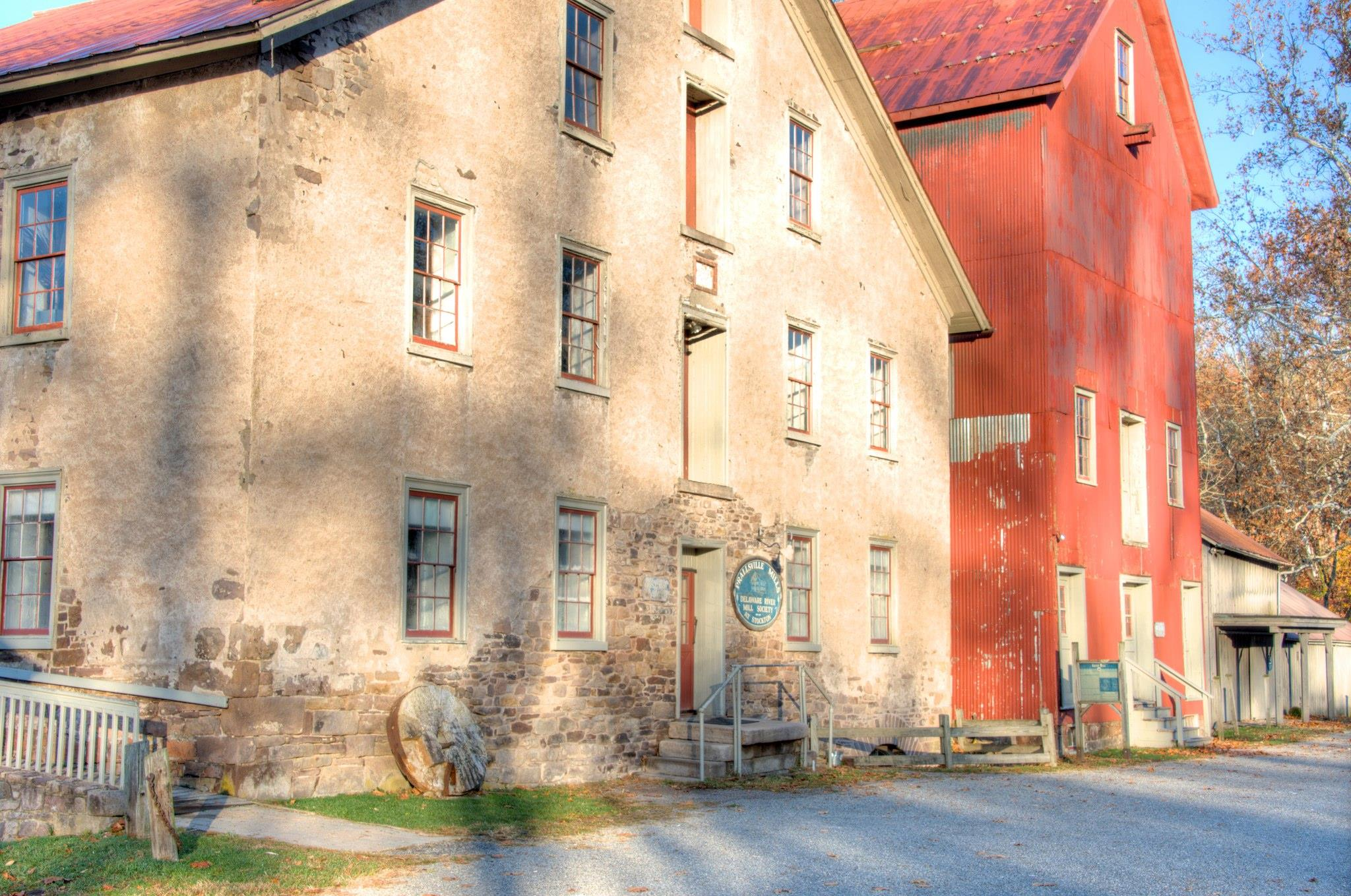
Grist Mill and Grain Silo

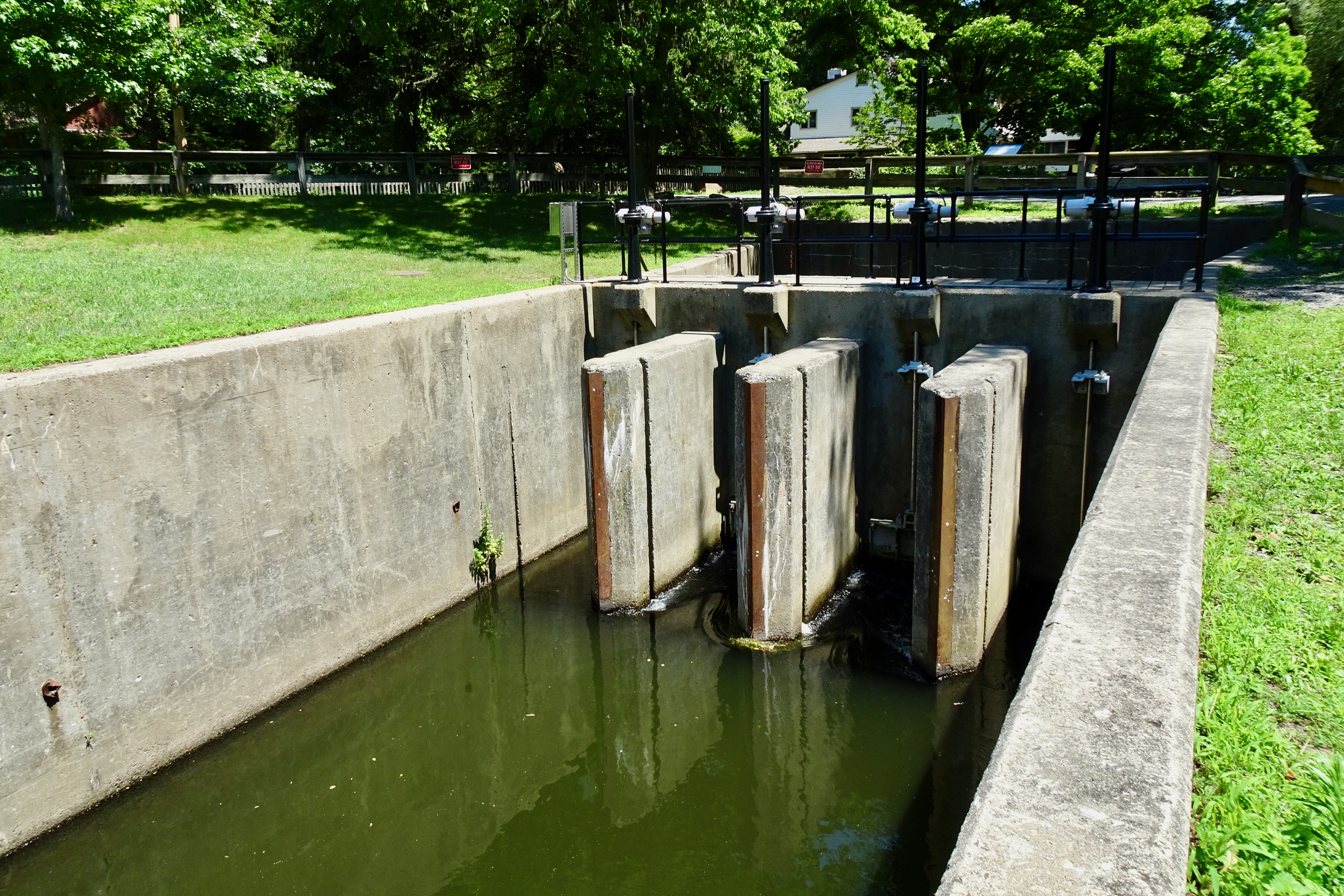
Lock on the Feeder Canal of the Delaware and Raritan Canal

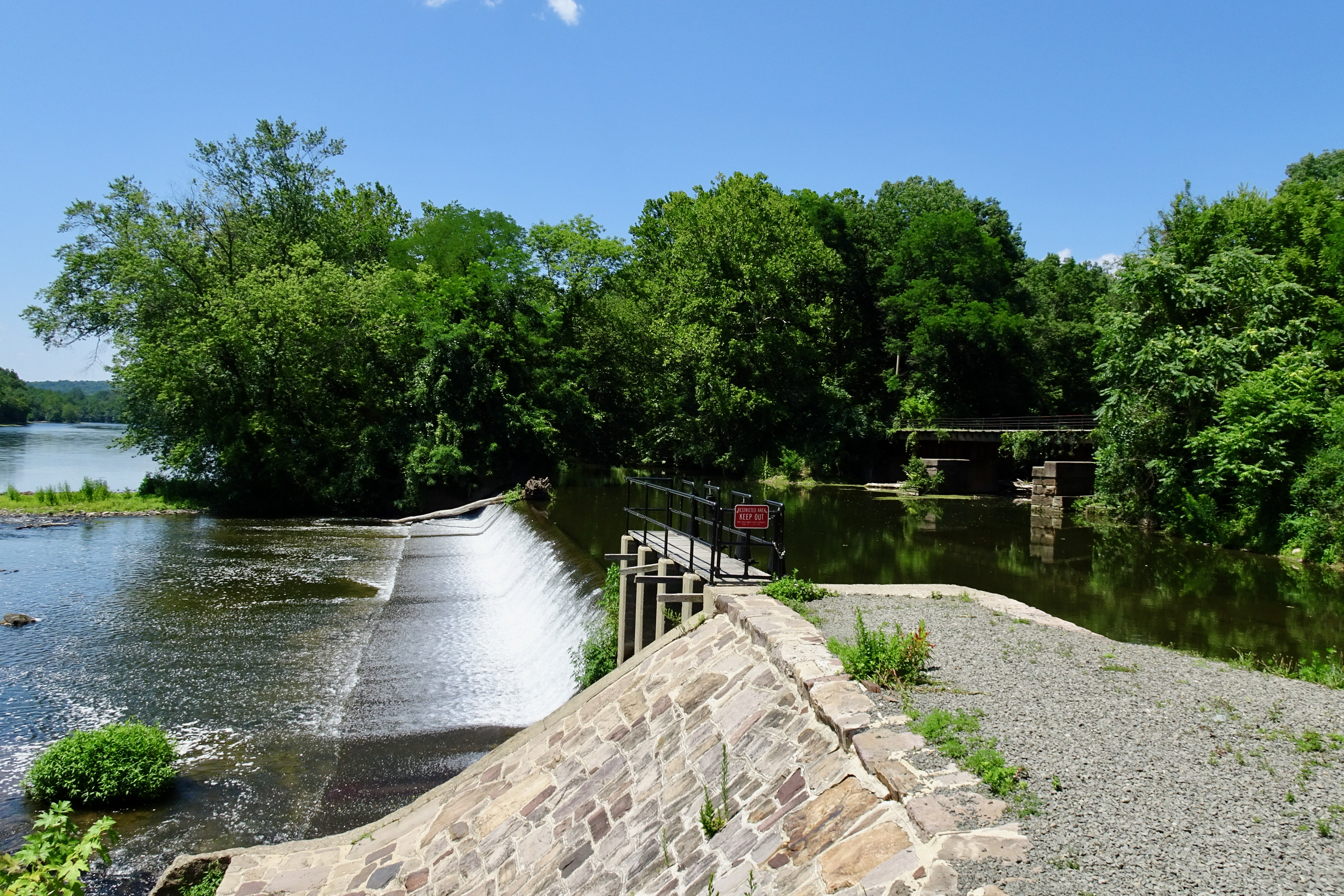
Feeder Canal overflow spillway for the Wickecheoke Creek
