= Green Sergeant's Covered Bridge =

- U.S. National Register of Historic Places
- U.S. Historic district – Contributing property
- New Jersey Register of Historic Places
- Green Sergeant's Covered Bridge, 2026

- Location within Hunterdon County, New Jersey Location within New Jersey Location within the United States
- Location: Rosemont-Sergeantsville Road over the Wickecheoke Creek
- Nearest city: Stockton, New Jersey
- Coordinates: 40°26′39″N 74°57′59″W
- Built: 1872
- Architect: Charles Ogden Holcombe
- Part of: Covered Bridge Historic District (ID99000269)
- NRHP reference No.: 74001165
- NJRHP No.: 1582

Significant dates
- Added to NRHP: November 19, 1974
- Designated CP: March 5, 1999
- Designated NJRHP: July 1, 1974

Green Sergeant's Covered Bridge is a wooden covered bridge which carries the westbound direction of County Route 604 over the Wickecheoke Creek near the border between the Hunterdon Plateau and Amwell Valley in Delaware Township, Hunterdon County, New Jersey. As the last historic covered bridge in the state of New Jersey, it was listed on the National Register of Historic Places on November 19, 1974 for its significance in engineering and transportation (the Scarborough Bridge in Cherry Hill is the only other covered bridge in New Jersey). It was added as a contributing property to the Covered Bridge Historic District in 1999.

== History ==
In 1805, Charles Sergeant bought the property in the area. After his death in 1833, the property was inherited by his son, Richard Green Sergeant, the namesake of the bridge. The bridge was constructed in 1872, designed by Charles Ogden Holcombe of Lambertville. After being damaged in 1960, it was dismantled and replaced with a modern bridge. In 1961, due to public outcry, the bridge was rebuilt from the original materials.

The bridge has been damaged numerous times over the course of its history by vehicles striking the bridge structure, most recently in 2013 when a truck damaged the support beams of the bridge.

== Gallery ==
2026 view of the eastern end of the bridge

== See also ==
- National Register of Historic Places listings in Hunterdon County, New Jersey
- List of bridges on the National Register of Historic Places in New Jersey
