= Wooddale Historic District =

Historic district in Delaware, United States

- U.S. National Register of Historic Places
- U.S. Historic district
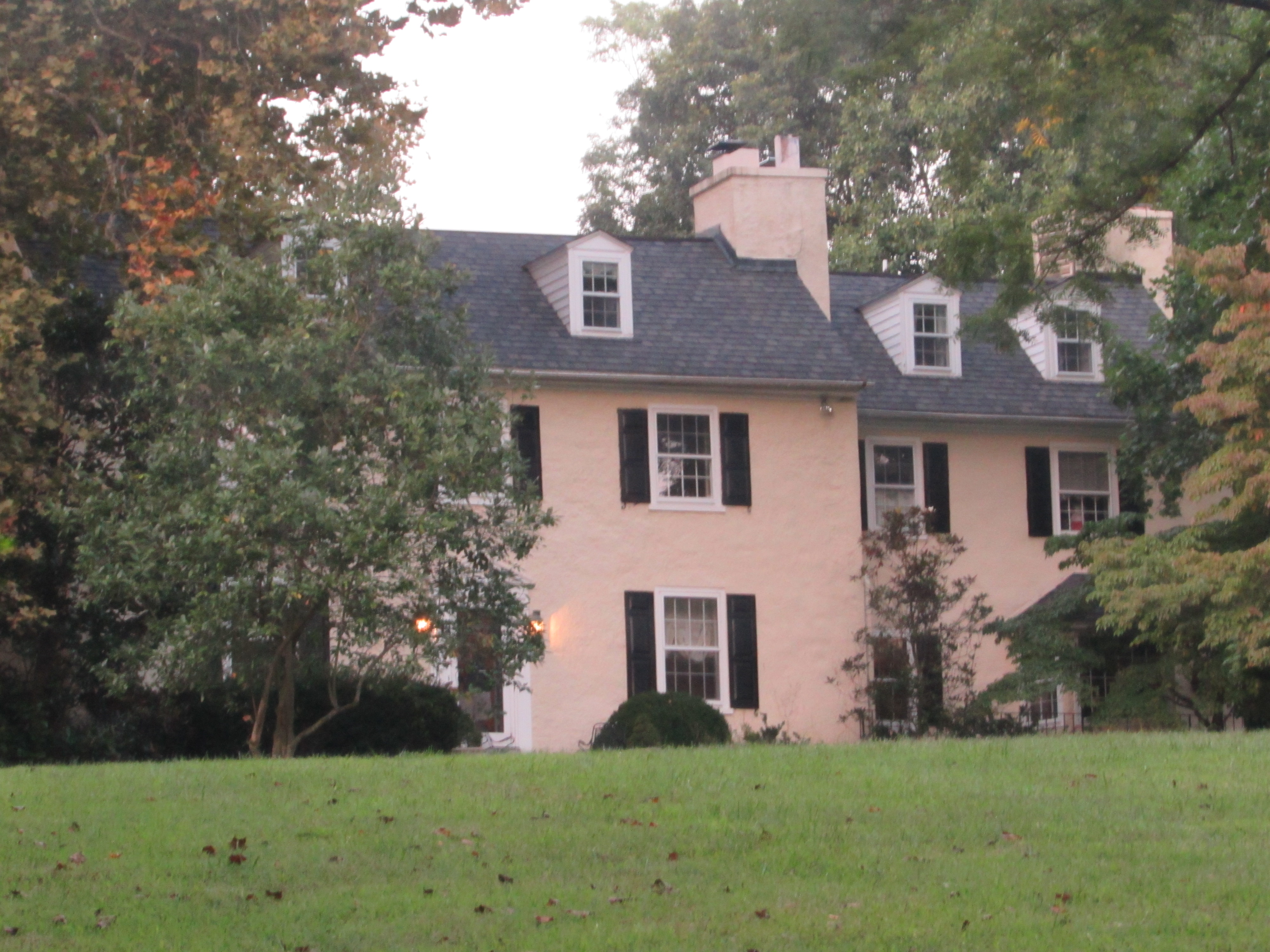
- Alan Wood House, August 2015

- Location within Delaware Location within the United States
- Location: Northwest of Newport on Wooddale Rd, Wooddale, near Newport, Delaware
- Coordinates: 39.76699°N 75.63821°W
- Area: 0 acres (0 ha)
- Built: 1826
- Architect: Multiple
- NRHP reference No.: 79000630
- Added to NRHP: August 24, 1979

Wooddale Historic District, also known as the Delaware Iron Works, is a national historic district located at Wooddale in New Castle County, Delaware.

== Background ==
It encompasses six contributing buildings and one contributing site associated with the Delaware Iron Works. They are the Alan Wood House, four workers' dwellings, a banked outbuilding, and the mill site. The works remained in operation from 1826 into the 1870s.

The site was later purchased by the Honorable John Biggs Jr, Chief Justice US Court of Appeals.

It was added to the National Register of Historic Places in 1979.
