= Pisgah Covered Bridge =

Bridge in North Carolina, U.S.

- Pisgah Community Covered Bridge
- U.S. National Register of Historic Places
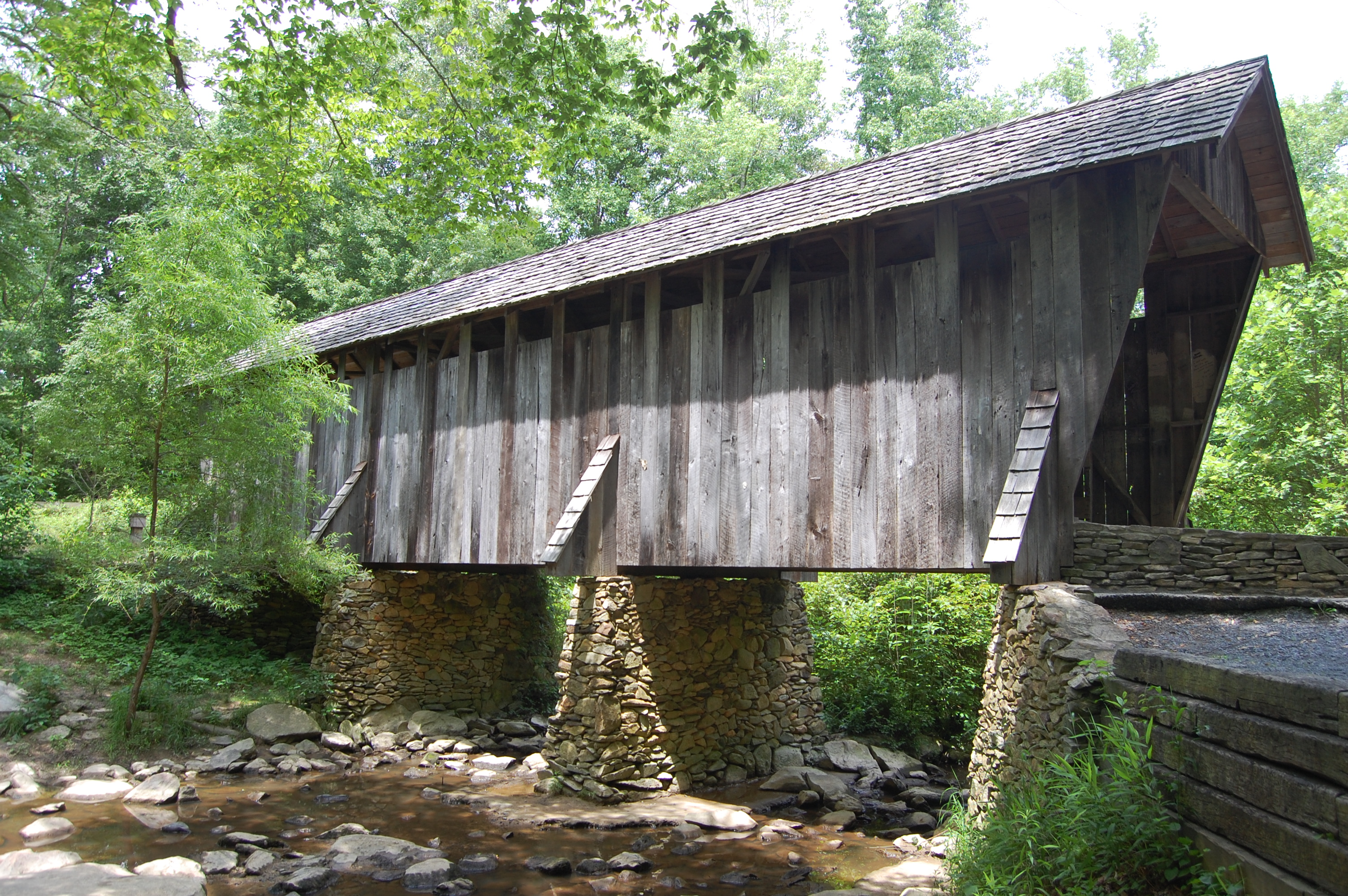

- Location within North Carolina Location within the United States
- Location: Southeast of Pisgah on SR 1109 off SR 1112, near Pisgah, North Carolina
- Coordinates: 35°32′31.56″N 79°53′37.97″W
- Area: 4 acres (1.6 ha)
- Built: 1910
- Built by: Welch, J.J.
- Architectural style: Modified queenpost truss
- NRHP reference No.: 72000988
- Added to NRHP: January 20, 1972

Pisgah Covered Bridge is a wooden covered bridge that spans the west fork of the Little River in Randolph County, North Carolina. It is one of two remaining original historic covered bridges in the state, (the other being the Bunker Hill Covered Bridge in Claremont, North Carolina) and is designated as both a local and federal historic landmark.

== History ==
The bridge was built in 1911 by J. J. Welch at a cost of $40. It is a one-lane bridge, 54 feet in length. The bridge eventually became obsolete when it could no longer handle the increased traffic, but it remains as a tourist attraction located at 6925 Pisgah Covered Bridge Road, west of the community of Pisgah. The road now crosses a nearby two-lane concrete bridge built in the 1950s.

== Preservation ==
Since 1998, the North Carolina Zoo Society has collaborated with the North Carolina Department of Transportation, the Piedmont Land Conservancy, and the Landtrust for Central North Carolina to maintain and refurbish the bridge. The bridge was washed away by a flood on August 9, 2003, but was rebuilt the next year using much of the original materials that were retrieved by local area volunteers. The restoration was able to salvage about 90 percent of the materials from the original structure. The bridge is assumed originally to have had a shingle roof; however, it was replaced with tin in the 1930s. In the restoration, the roof was shingled.

There is now a gate on the road leading to the bridge, however, it is open to the public daily from dawn to dusk.

== Sightseeing ==
There is a quarter-mile trail through the woods on site. The trail crosses footbridges and passes a baptismal pool, downstream from the bridge.
