= Ashland Covered Bridge =

Covered bridge in Delaware, US

- Ashland Bridge
- U.S. National Register of Historic Places
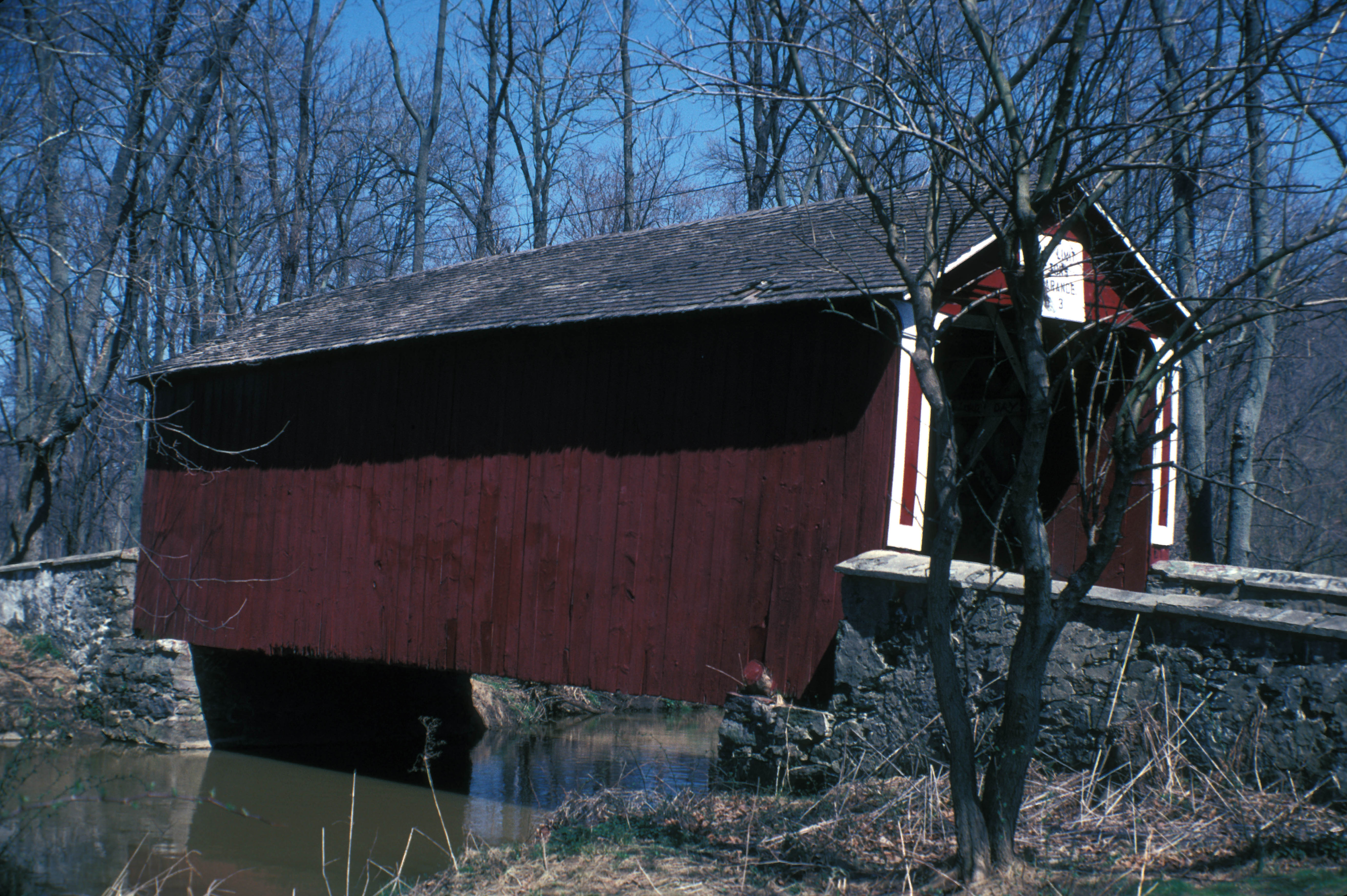
- Bridge in 1982

- Location within Delaware Location within the United States
- Location: South of Ashland over Red Clay Creek, Ashland, Delaware
- Coordinates: 39.798275°N 75.657883°W
- Built: c. 1860
- Architectural style: Covered bridge
- NRHP reference No.: 73000506
- Added to NRHP: March 20, 1973

Ashland Covered Bridge, also known as Ashland Bridge or Barley Mill Road Covered Bridge, is a covered bridge over Red Clay Creek on Barley Mill Road (near the junction of Brackenville Road) in Ashland in New Castle County, Delaware, United States. It was added to the National Register of Historic Places in 1973.

== Style ==
It is a Town lattice truss bridge following a design of Ithiel Town, built about 1860. It is almost identical to the Wooddale Bridge. It is believed to be about 12 feet (3.7 meters) long and adjoins the Ashland Nature Center.

== History ==
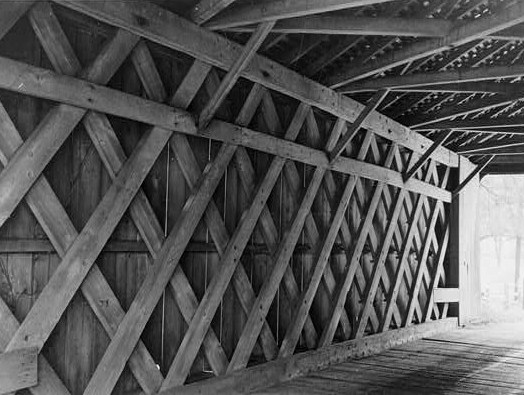
Interior lattice work

In 1965, when it was documented in the Historic American Engineering Record survey, it was one of the last three surviving covered bridges in the state of Delaware.

The bridge has been closed for repairs several times in the 2010s. In 2014 and 2011, oversized trucks caused damage to the bridge after ignoring signage and attempting to cross, and in 2017 a snow plow crash caused additional damage. In 2021, it was closed for temporary repairs after debris and high creek levels due to Hurricane Ida caused damage to the covered portion of the span.

== See also ==
- List of covered bridges in the United States
