= Swamp Meadow Bridge =

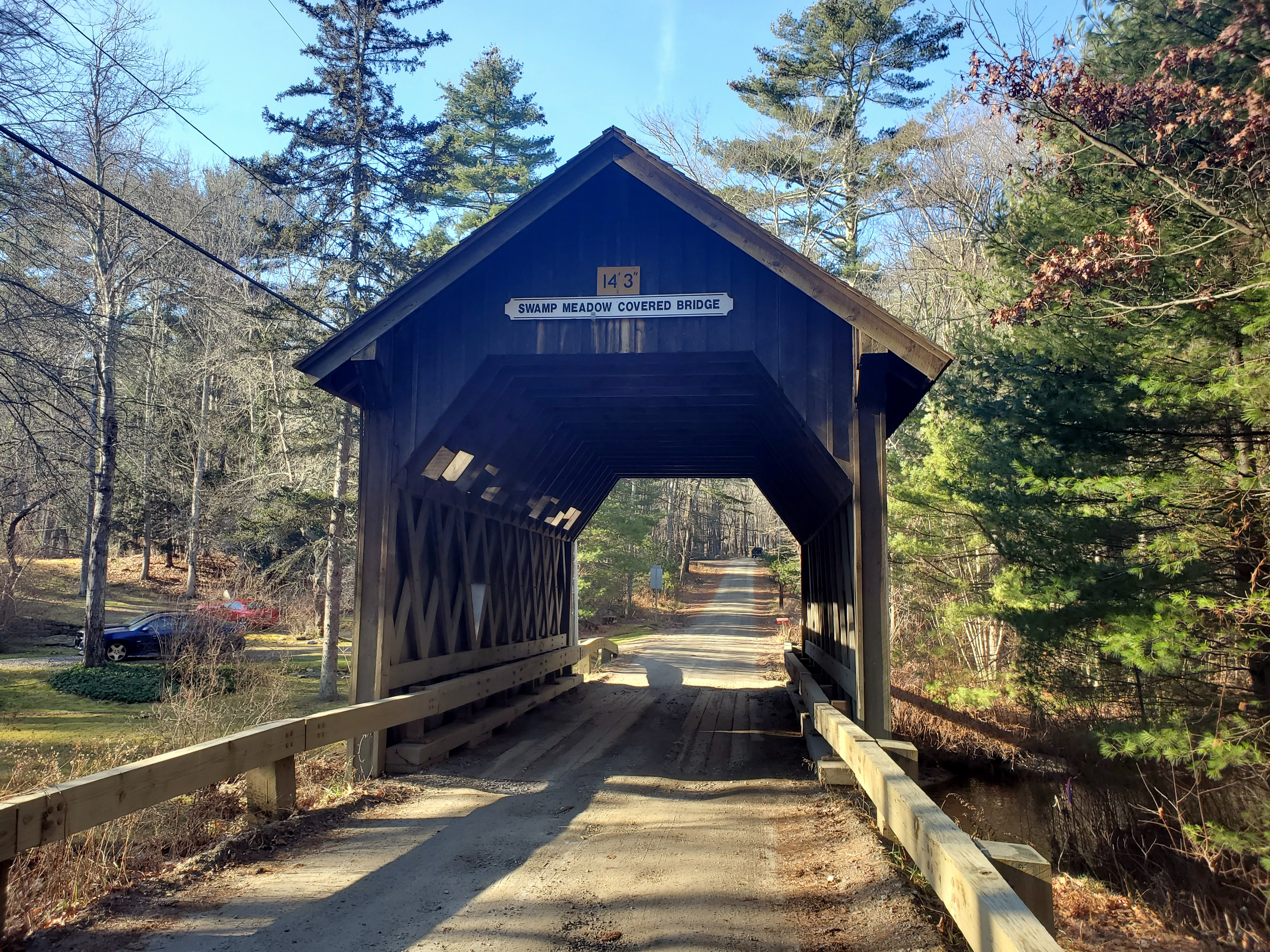
- Swamp Meadow Bridge in December 2023
- Coordinates: 41.79957°N 71.72943°W
- Crosses: Hemlock Brook
- Locale: Foster, Rhode Island

Characteristics
- Design: covered bridge
- Total length: 36 feet (11 m)
- Width: 16 feet (4.9 m)

History
- Construction start: 1993
- Construction end: 1994
- Opened: 1994

Swamp Meadow Bridge is a covered bridge crossing Hemlock Brook located on Central Pike in the town of Foster, Rhode Island. It is the second bridge to be built at this site.

== History ==
The first bridge was proposed in 1986, when the Town of Foster decided to build a covered bridge in honor of Rhode Island's 350th birthday. The wood was donated by Providence Water Supply. It used Town lattice trusses and was built over an existing steel bridge. Approval from the Rhode Island Department of Transportation came in 1992, and construction began on 12 September 1992. Jed Dixon was the bridge's designer, and all work was performed by volunteers. The bridge was dedicated on 23 May 1993 but was burned by vandals on September 11 of that year. There was an immediate campaign to rebuild the bridge. Twelve days after the destruction, the town council approved construction of the current bridge, which was dedicated on 5 November 1994.

== Structure ==
The bridge uses an Ithiel Town lattice truss design including authentic wooden trunnels. Lengthwise planks cover the roadway area with macadam filling the gaps. The entire deck area is supported by six I-beam stringers. The bridge rests on concrete abutments which extend to form road-level wing walls. Each side has one diamond-shaped opening. A heavy curb-high timber runs along each side of the bridge.

== See also ==
- List of covered bridges in Rhode Island
