= Scarborough Bridge =

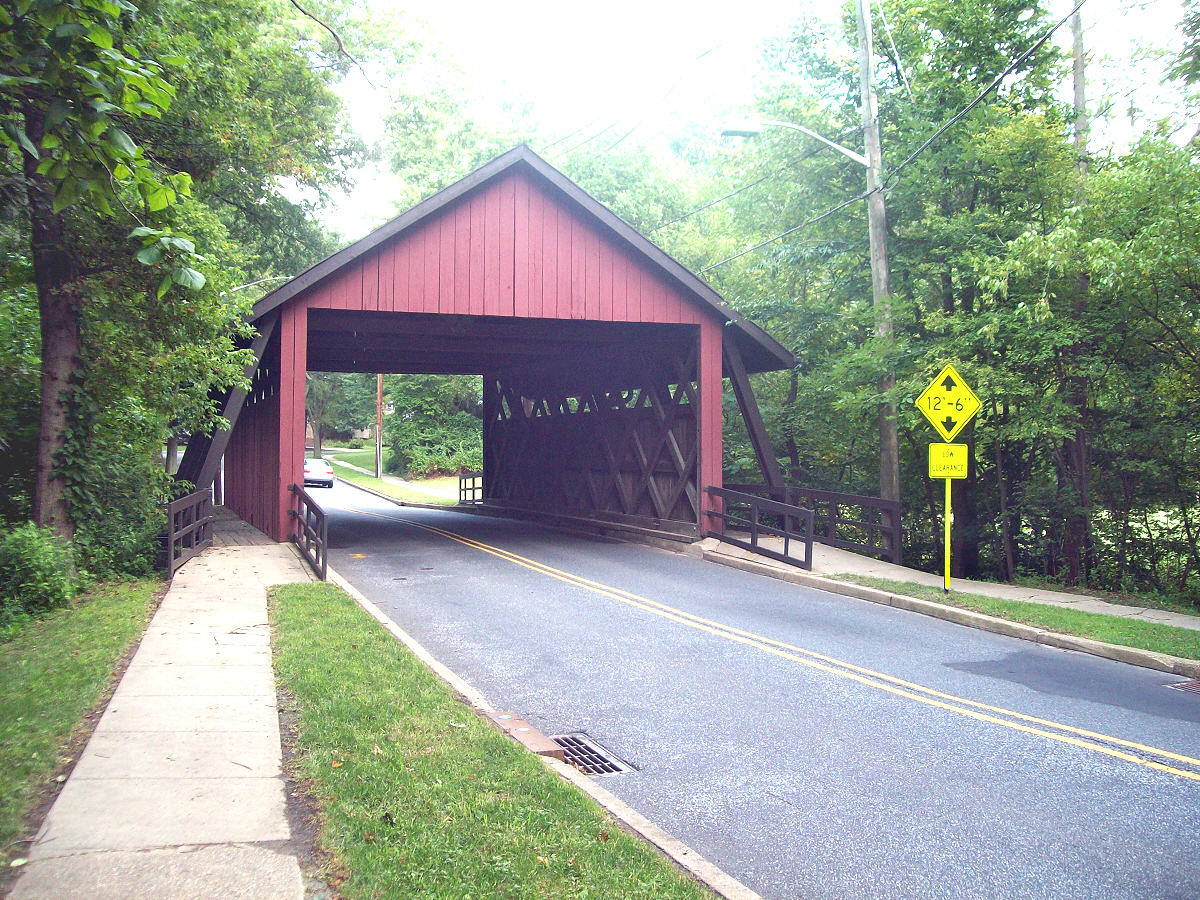
- Coordinates: 39°54′02″N 74°59′33″W
- Carries: 2 lanes of Covered Bridge Road
- Crosses: North Branch of the Cooper River
- Locale: Cherry Hill, New Jersey

Characteristics
- Total length: 55 feet
- Width: 20 feet
- Clearance above: 12 feet, 6 inches

History
- Designer: Malcolm Wells
- Opened: February 14, 1959

Location
- Interactive map of Scarborough Bridge

The Scarborough Bridge is a wooden covered bridge in the Barclay Farm neighborhood of Cherry Hill, New Jersey. It carries 2 lanes of Covered Bridge Road, as well as 2 sidewalks for pedestrians and bicyclists. The bridge was named after Bob Scarborough, a housing developer who established the Barclay Farm neighborhood, where the bridge is located. A bridge was needed in the area to extend the subdivision street system over the North Branch, which is a small tributary of the Cooper River. The bridge was designed by Malcolm Wells and was open to traffic on February 14, 1959. The bridge was renovated in 1993. Having a town truss design, the Scarborough Bridge is considered a historical landmark for the community.
