= List of covered bridges in Wisconsin =

Below is a list of covered bridges in Wisconsin. There are five authentic covered bridges in the U.S. state of Wisconsin; only one of them is historic. A covered bridge is considered authentic not due to its age, but by its construction. An authentic bridge is constructed using trusses rather than other methods such as stringers, a popular choice for non-authentic covered bridges.

== Bridges ==
Name	Image	County	Location	Built	Length	Crosses	Ownership	Truss	Notes
Cedarburg Covered Bridge	Cedarburg Covered Bridge	Ozaukee	Cedarburg; 43°20′16″N 88°0′16″W	1876	120 feet (37 m)	Cedar Creek	County of Ozaukee	Town	Once known as Red Bridge; center pier added in 1927
Red Mill Covered Bridge		Waupaca	Dayton; 44°19′6″N 89°6′30″W	1970	40 feet (12 m)	Crystal River		Town	
Smith Rapids Covered Bridge	Smith Rapids Covered Bridge	Price	Chequamegon; 45°54′40″N 90°10′19″W	1991	94 feet (29 m)	Flambeau River		Town	Also called Chequamegon Bridge
Springwater Volunteer Covered Bridge		Waushara	Springwater; 44°10′46″N 89°8′1″W	1997	44 feet (13 m)	Pine River	Town of Springwater	Town	Built as a replica of Cedarburg Covered Bridge
Stonefield Village Covered Bridge		Grant	Cassville; 42°43′47″N 91°1′3″W	1962	51 feet (16 m)	Dewey Creek	Wisconsin Historical Society	Howe	

== See also ==
- List of bridges on the National Register of Historic Places in Wisconsin
- World Guide to Covered Bridges
