= Bunker Hill Covered Bridge =

- U.S. National Register of Historic Places
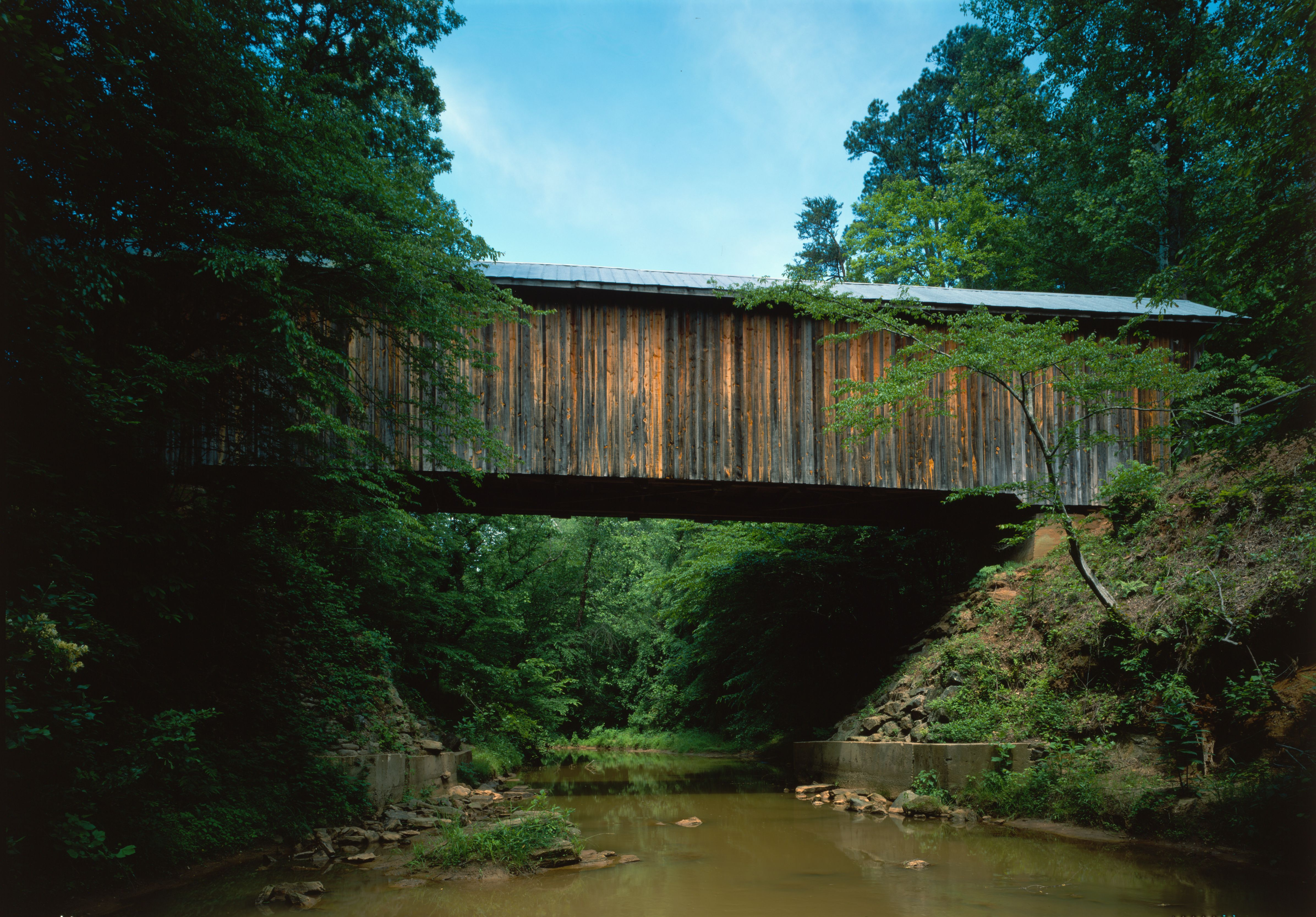

- Location within North Carolina Location within the United States
- Nearest city: Claremont, North Carolina
- Coordinates: 35.721515°N 81.115226°W
- Built: 1895
- Architectural style: Haupt truss
- NRHP reference No.: 70000446
- Added to NRHP: February 26, 1970

The Bunker Hill Covered Bridge is one of two covered bridges left in North Carolina, (the other being the Pisgah Covered Bridge in Randolph County), and is possibly the last wooden bridge in the United States with Haupt truss construction. It was built in 1895 by Andrew Loretz Ramsour (1817–1906) in Claremont, North Carolina, and crosses Lyle Creek.

The bridge was designated a National Historic Civil Engineering Landmark by the American Society of Civil Engineers in 2001 and is also listed on the National Register of Historic Places.

== History and design ==
The project to build the bridge was started in 1894 when Catawba County Commissioners requested nearby owners of the Bunker Hill Farm to build and maintain a bridge that would cross Lyle Creek on the old Island Ford Road (a former Native American trail). According to local archives, Ramsour found the Haupt truss design in a book. Since the bridge was originally constructed as an open span, its 91-foot-long (28 m) roof wasn't added until 1900, and in 1921, its original wooden shingle roof was replaced with a tin roof. The bridge was owned by the Bolick family until 1985 when they donated it to the Catawba County Historical Association, who restored it in 1994.

== See also ==
- List of bridges documented by the Historic American Engineering Record in North Carolina
