= Wooddale Bridge =

- U.S. National Register of Historic Places
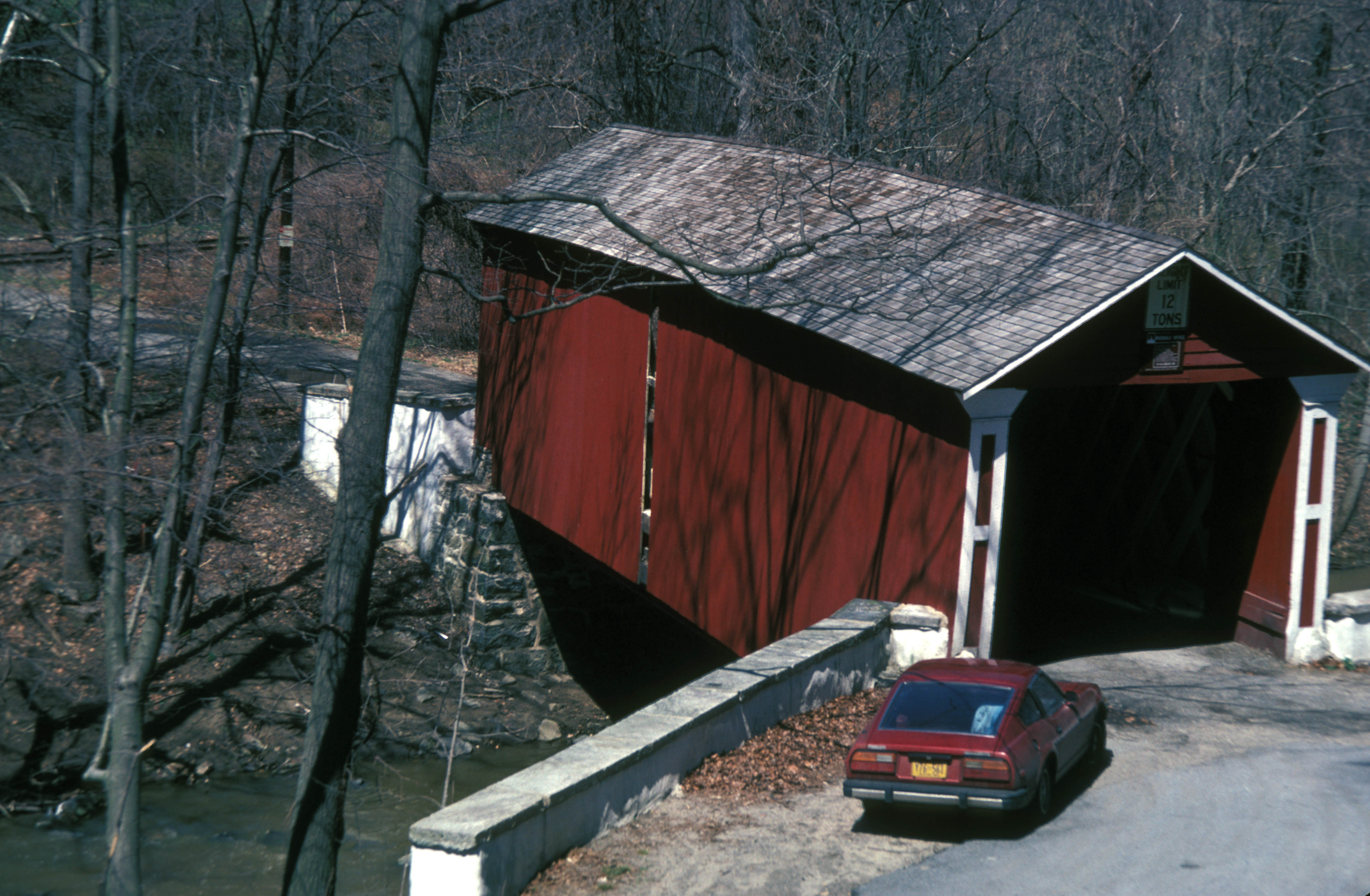
- Wooddale Bridge, 1982

- Location within Delaware Location within the United States
- Location: Foxhill Ln. over Red Clay Creek, Wooddale, Delaware
- Coordinates: 39.76593°N 75.63681°W
- Area: less than one acre
- Built: c. 1850
- Architectural style: Covered bridge
- NRHP reference No.: 73000552
- Added to NRHP: April 11, 1973

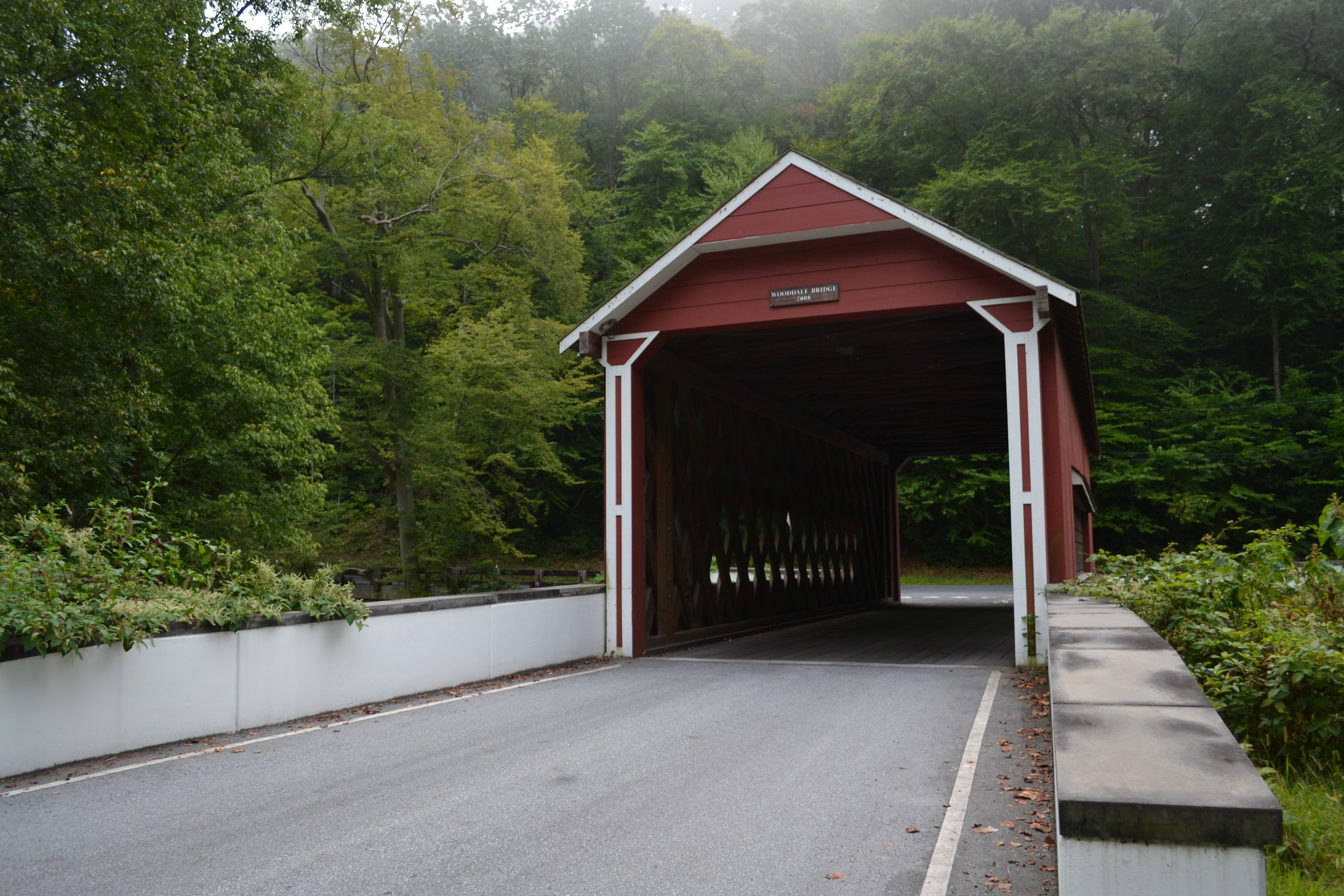
The reconstructed bridge in 2015

Wooddale Bridge is a covered bridge over Red Clay Creek at Wooddale in New Castle County, Delaware. It is one of three covered bridges in the state of Delaware along with the very similar Ashland Covered Bridge and the Smith Bridge. It and the Ashland bridge remain, of the thirteen bridges along the Red Clay Creek that were marked on an 1868 map.

== Style ==
The Wooddale Bridge is a Town lattice truss bridge following a design by Ithiel Town and is approximately 72 feet (22 m) long. It originally sat on mortared rough-cut stone abutments, with rock-slab-capped poured concrete guard walls. The floor of the bridge was diagonal planking, with vertical boarding on the sides that had square window openings to expose the white painted truss on either side.

== History ==
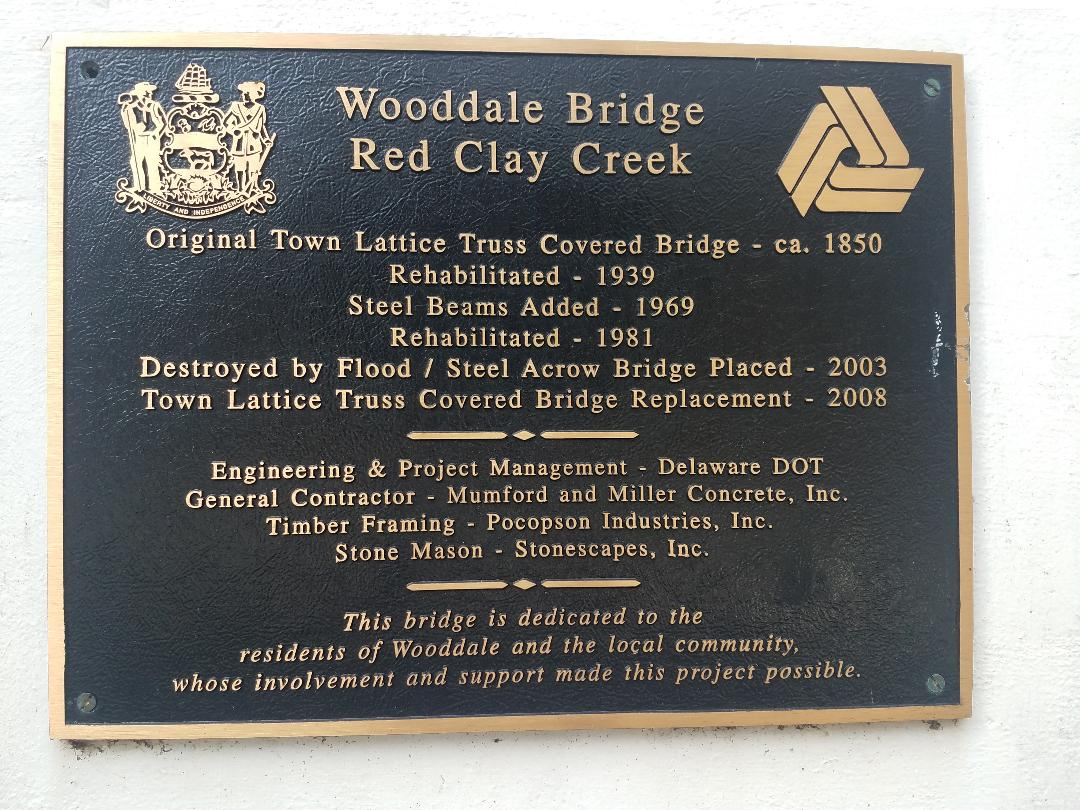
Plaque near the Covered Bridge installed after completion of the reconstructed bridge.

The original bridge was built about 1850 and was added to the National Register of Historic Places in 1973.

It was destroyed by flooding from Tropical Storm Henri in 2003. The bridge was rebuilt by the Delaware Department of Transportation in 2007–8 with design modifications to make it more flood-resistant. The bridge reopened on December 15, 2008, after it was rebuilt using Bongossi wood and the roadway was raised five feet to protect against future floods and the openings enlarged. In total the rebuilding and road work was US$3.374 million.

The bridge became a geocaching location in 2011.

== See also ==
- List of covered bridges in the United States
