= Pisgah, North Carolina =

Unincorporated community in North Carolina, US

Coordinates: 35°32′59″N 079°52′16″W

Pisgah is an unincorporated community in Randolph County, North Carolina, United States. It is located north of the community of Abner.
