= Campbell's Covered Bridge =

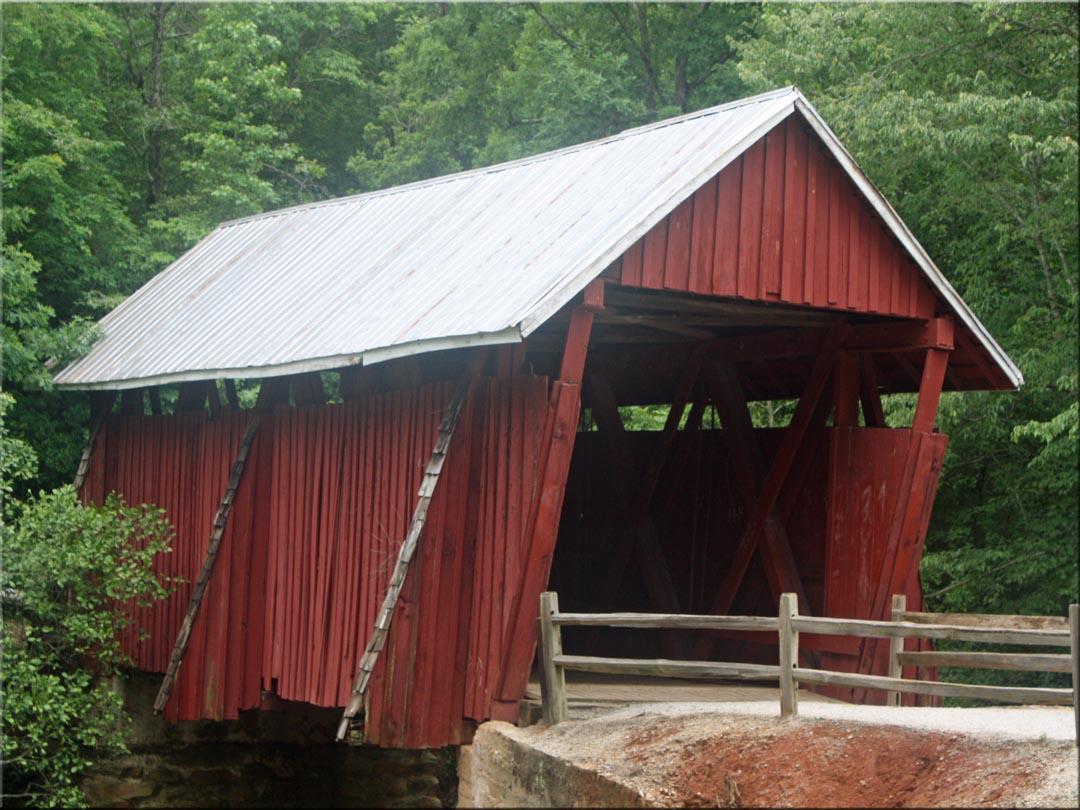
- A photo of Campbell's Covered Bridge near Gowensville, South Carolina.
- Coordinates: 35°5′9″N 82°15′51″W
- Carries: 123 Campbell Covered Bridge Rd.
- Crosses: Beaverdam Creek
- Locale: Gowensville, Greenville County, South Carolina

Characteristics
- Design: Covered bridge
- Total length: 38 ft (12 m)
- Width: 12 ft (3.7 m)

History
- Construction end: 1909
- Campbell's Covered Bridge
- U.S. National Register of Historic Places
- Location within South Carolina Location within the United States
- Location: 123 Campbell Covered Bridge Rd., Gowensville, South Carolina
- Area: less than one acre
- Built: 1909
- Architectural style: Howe truss
- NRHP reference No.: 09000483
- Added to NRHP: July 1, 2009

Location
- Interactive map of Campbell's Covered Bridge

The brass memorial plaque for the Campbell's Covered Bridge (1909).

Campbell's Covered Bridge is a wooden covered bridge in northeastern Greenville County, South Carolina, near the small town of Gowensville, and crosses Beaverdam Creek off Pleasant Hill Road.

Campbell's Covered Bridge is the last remaining covered bridge in South Carolina. It is owned by Greenville County, which closed it to motorized traffic in the early 1980s. The bridge was added to the National Register of Historic Places on July 1, 2009.

The Historic Campbell's Covered Bridge is the only remaining covered bridge in South Carolina, U.S.A. (2023).

== History ==
The bridge was built in 1909 by Charles Irwin Willis (1878–1966) and was named for grist mill owner Alexander Lafayette Campbell (1836–1920), who built and maintained the nearby mill for many years, portions of which remain.

The Campbell bridge has been restored twice, first in 1964 by the Crescent Garden Club, and then in 1990.

The land surrounding the bridge was owned by Sylvia Pittman from 1991 until 2008, when she sold 10 acres (40,000 m^{2}) to the Greenville County Recreation District. She said, "I had in mind to have a park preserve this to let everyone enjoy this like we have." The US$180,000 for creating the park was covered by state and county grants.

== Structure ==
The Campbell's bridge is 38 feet (12 m) long and 12 feet (3.7 m) wide. It was constructed in the relatively rare four-span, Howe truss design and features vertical iron rods and diagonal pine timbers.
