= Wooddale, Delaware =

Unincorporated community in Delaware, United States

- Unincorporated community
- Location within Delaware Location within the United States
- Coordinates: 39°45′58″N 75°38′13″W
- Country: United States
- State: Delaware
- County: New Castle
- Elevation: 108 ft (33 m)
- Time zone: UTC-5 (Eastern (EST))
  - Summer (DST): UTC-4 (EDT)
- Area code: 302
- GNIS feature ID: 216256

Wooddale is an unincorporated community in New Castle County, Delaware, United States. Wooddale is located along the Red Clay Creek and Rolling Mill Road, west of Wilmington.

== History ==
The community was home to the Wooddale Paper Mills and iron mills in the 1800s. The Spring Valley Brewing Company, led by F. Hermann Biedermann sold draft beer to saloons within the neighborhood in the late 1800s.

== Historic registers ==
The Wooddale Historic District and Wooddale Bridge are listed on the National Register of Historic Places.
