= Wickecheoke Creek =

Delaware River tributary in Hunterdon County, New Jersey

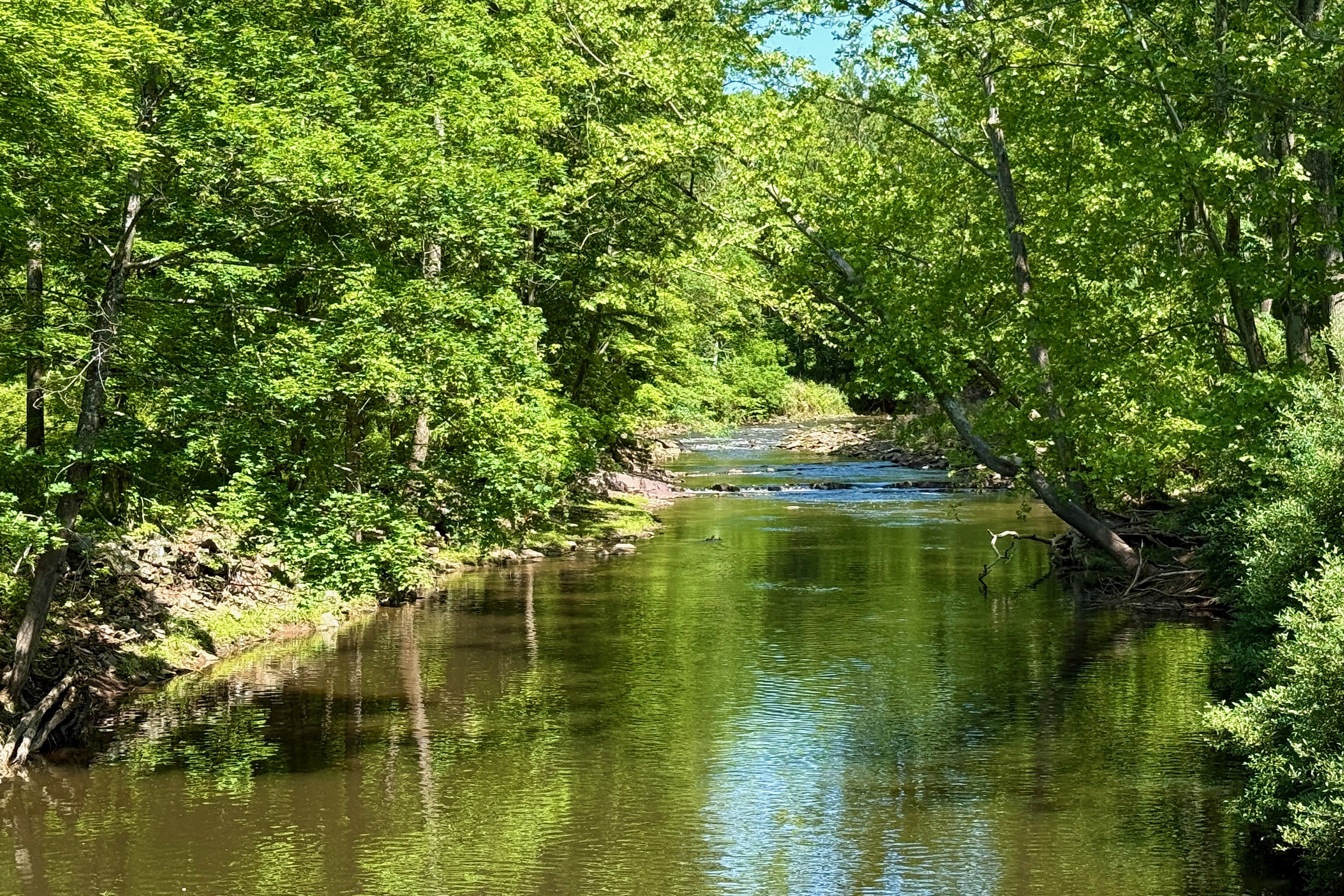
- Wickecheoke Creek at Lower Creek Road in Delaware Township

Location
- Country: United States
- State: New Jersey
- Region: Hunterdon County

Physical characteristics
- Source
  - location: Raritan Township
  - coordinates: 40°33′17.4″N 74°54′44.6″W
- Mouth: Delaware River
  - location: Prallsville
  - coordinates: 40°24′33.0″N 74°59′11.3″W

Basin features
- River system: Delaware River

Wickecheoke Creek is a 15.0-mile-long (24.1 km) tributary of the Delaware River in Hunterdon County, New Jersey, United States.

It originates in Raritan Township on the Hunterdon Plateau and flows through Croton and Locktown before cascading off the Plateau where it passes under the Green Sergeant's Covered Bridge, one of the two last remaining covered bridges in the state. It cuts through part of the Amwell Valley and several steep sections of the Rosemont Valley before reaching the Delaware River. Before reaching the Delaware, it cuts through a low ridge and is joined by Plum Brook. Further south it and cuts through a second slightly larger ridge to the west of Sergeantsville. Rose Creek enters the creek two miles before it reaches the Delaware and Raritan Canal and the Delaware River at Prallsville.

The Creek receives most of its water from springs as it passes through woodlands and farm fields. Water birds, eagles, beaver, and mink can be seen near the trout-stocked stream. Trails and narrow lanes along its banks also make it a favorite for artists, anglers, cyclists and hikers. The lower portion of what locals call "the Wick," runs through farms and forests protected by the New Jersey Conservation Foundation. The Foundation's Donald Jones Footpath follows the Creek for nearly two miles, just above Prallsville and the town of Stockton, New Jersey.

The name Wickecheoke comes from a Unami word — wichkaachkwik, or "where there are birch trees".

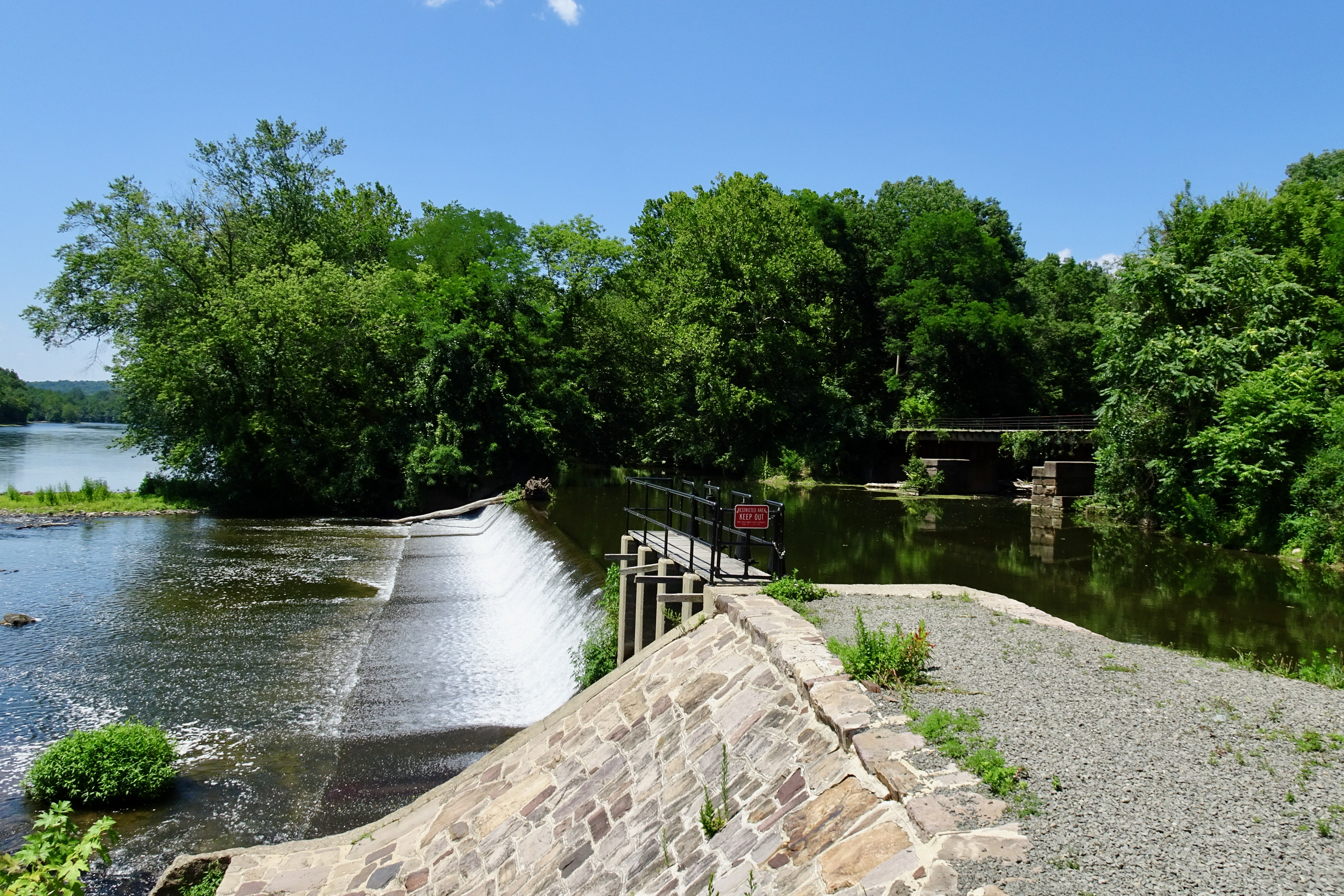
Wickecheoke Creek overflow from the feeder canal of the Delaware and Raritan Canal into the Delaware River at Prallsville

== See also ==
- List of rivers of New Jersey
