= Cooper River (New Jersey) =

Tributary of the Delaware River in southwestern New Jersey

Coordinates: 39.92514°N 75.07009°W

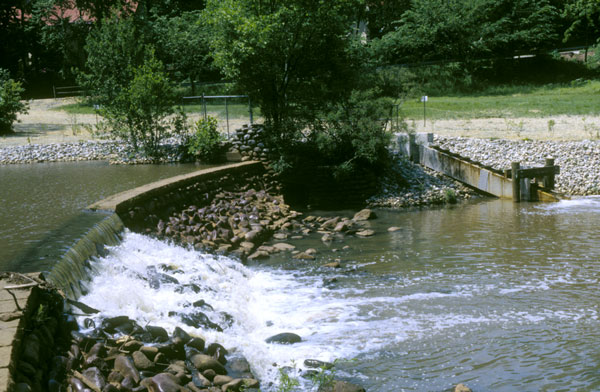
Evans Pond Impoundment with Fish Ladder, Haddonfield

The Cooper River is a tributary of the Delaware River in southwestern New Jersey in the United States.

The confluence of the Cooper River with the Delaware River is in Camden. The Cooper River serves as a border between Cherry Hill, Pennsauken, New Jersey on the north bank, and Collingswood, Haddon Township, Haddonfield, and Lawnside on the southern bank.

The Cooper River (known upstream near Haddonfield as Cooper's Creek) was named after the Cooper family, who were some of the first European settlers in the area of Camden County, New Jersey. This tributary of the Delaware River is 16 miles (25.7 km) long measuring from its headwater in Gibbsboro (it is notable that the Northern Branch begins in Voorhees Township). The Cooper River Watershed covers 40 square miles (100 km^{2}), and includes the tributaries Chandlers Run, Millard Creek, Nicholson Branch, the North Branch, and Tindale Run (the last two being the most significant). Although historically a tidal river (the most severe tide reportedly reached Kings Highway), all present tidal influence stops at the Kaighn Avenue Bridge, in Camden, where it is impounded.

The Cooper flows through Barrington, Berlin Township, Camden, Cherry Hill, Collingswood, Gibbsboro, Haddon Township, Haddonfield, Lawnside, Lindenwold, Magnolia, Merchantville, Pennsauken Township, Somerdale, Stratford, Tavistock and Voorhees Township.

The Cooper also has seven impoundments, not listed in geographical order: Cooper River Lake, Evans Pond, Hopkins Pond, Kirkwood Lake, Linden Lake, Square Circle Lake, Wallworth Lake.

== Historical reference ==
Benjamin Franklin made a brief visit to Cooper's Creek on his way to Philadelphia, as a run-away apprentice from Boston in 1723: "However, walking in the evening by the side of the river, a boat came by, which I found was going towards Philadelphia, with several people in her. They took me in, and, as there was no wind, we row'd all the way; and about midnight, not having yet seen the city, some of the company were confident we must have passed it, and would row no farther; the others knew not where we were; so we put toward the shore, got into a creek, landed near an old fence, with the rails of which we made a fire, the night being cold, in October, and there we remained till daylight. Then one of the company knew the place to be Cooper's Creek, a little above Philadelphia, which we saw as soon as we got out of the creek, and arrived there about eight or nine o'clock on the Sunday morning, and landed at the Market-street wharf."

== Recreation ==
The Camden County Boathouse sits on the banks of the Cooper River in Pennsauken Township and is home to eight area rowing clubs, including local high schools and Rutgers University-Camden, which are active February through November.

The Cooper River Yacht Club is situated on the Cooper River in Collingswood and offers sailing instruction courses during the summer to children and adults, as well as organizing racing events from time to time.

Using a canoe, people can navigate the Cooper from its mouth to southern Haddonfield; however, it is necessary to cross several impoundments. Canoeing the Cooper into and farther than Greenwald Park in Cherry Hill is technically a violation of local watercraft laws.

Fishing in the river has improved since the installation of fish ladders along the impoundments. In season, small fish such as sunnies and smallmouth bass can be caught.

== Sports ==
Since 1955, the Cooper River has been the site of the Intercollegiate Rowing Association's IRA Championship Regatta, which is considered to be the United States collegiate national championship of rowing.

The 2007 Scholastic Rowing Association of America national championships and USRowing club national championships were held on the Cooper River.

The trail around the river regularly hosts community races such as the 9/11 Heroes Run hosted by the Travis Manion Foundation.

== See also ==
- List of rivers of New Jersey
