= National Register of Historic Places listings in Alexander County, North Carolina =

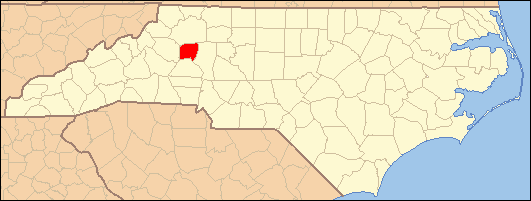

This list includes properties and districts listed on the National Register of Historic Places in Alexander County, North Carolina, United States. Click the "Map of all coordinates" link to the right to view an online map of all properties and districts with latitude and longitude coordinates in the table below.

This National Park Service list is complete through NPS recent listings posted March 20, 2026.

== Current listings ==
	Name on the Register	Image	Date listed	Location	City or town	Description
1	Downtown Taylorsville Historic District		August 6, 2024 (#100010675)	12-46 West Main Avenue, 11-163 East Main Avenue (north side), 72-134 Main Avenue Drive (north side), and 1-19 South Center Street; 35°55′22″N 81°10′33″W	Taylorsville	
2	Lucas Mansion	Lucas Mansion	December 2, 1982 (#82001279)	Church St. 35°54′25″N 81°05′30″W	Hiddenite	The Lucas Mansion, also known as the Hiddenite Center, is a historic home built about 1900 in Hiddenite, Alexander County, North Carolina. It was owned by James Paul Lucas, a South Carolina native and international diamond merchant. The current Hiddenite Center has period furnishings and a collection of local gemstones and minerals on the first floor.
3	Taylorsville Milling Company Roller Mill	Taylorsville Milling Company Roller Mill	August 27, 2019 (#100004324)	53 Second Ave. North; 35°55′27″N 81°10′22″W	Taylorsville	The Taylorsville Milling Company Roller Mill is a historic manufacturing facility located in Taylorsville, North Carolina. It is one of the few surviving early 20th-century grain-processing facilities in the United States, built in 1902 to house a grist milling operation.

== See also ==
- National Register of Historic Places listings in North Carolina
- List of National Historic Landmarks in North Carolina
