= List of Highway Historical Markers in Alexander County, North Carolina =

Alexander County, North Carolina is in District M of the NC Highway Historical Marker Program, and has two markers as of July 2020. The program was created by the North Carolina General Assembly in 1935. Since that time over 1600 black and silver markers have been placed along numbered North Carolina highways throughout the state. Each one has a brief description of a fact relevant to state history, and is located near a place related to that fact. North Carolina's counties are divided into seventeen districts for the highway marker program. Each marker is assigned an identifier that begins with the letter of the district, followed by a number.

List of North Carolina Highway Historical Markers in Alexander County, NC
Number	Title	Location	Text	Year Erected
M-29	Hiddenite	NC 90 northwest of Hiddenite	"A gem found only in N.C., named for W. E. Hidden, mineralogist of N.Y., who prospected in this area about 1880. Mines were nearby."	1954
M-32	Brantley York	NC 90 west of Hiddenite	"Noted educator and minister. Founded York Collegiate Institute & numerous academies. Professor at Rutherford College. Grave 5mi. N."	1959
