= Alexander County Schools =

School district in North Carolina, United States

Location
- Alexander County, North Carolina North Carolina Foothills United States

District information
- Type: Public
- Grades: PK–12
- Superintendent: Dr. Bill Griffin
- Asst. superintendent(s): Dr. Alisha Cloer
- Accreditation: Southern Association of Colleges and Schools
- Schools: 12
- Budget: $45,308,560(2014-2015)
- NCES District ID: 3700090

Students and staff
- Students: 5,009
- Teachers: 343.80 (on FTE basis)
- Staff: 425 (on FTE basis)

Other information
- Website: www.alexander.k12.nc.us

Alexander County Schools is the public school system for all of Alexander County, North Carolina. 11 schools are located in the district.

== Governance ==
The primary governing body of Alexander County Schools follows a council–manager government format with a seven-member Board of Education appointing a Superintendent to run the day-to-day operations of the system. The school system is in the NC State Board of Education's Seventh District.

=== Board of education ===
The seven-member Alexander County Schools Board of Education meets on the second Monday of every month. The current members of the board are: Josh Dagenhart (Chair), Jesse Bowles (Vice-Chair), Robert Arguelles, Anthony McLain, Corey McLain, Shannon Oxentine, Matthew Reese.

=== Superintendent ===
The current superintendent of the system is Dr. Bill Griffin

== Member schools ==
Alexander County Schools has 11 schools ranging from pre-kindergarten to early college. Those 11 schools are separated into one early college, one high school, two middle schools, seven elementary schools, and one alternative learning school.

=== Early College ===
- Alexander Early College (Taylorsville)

=== High school ===
- Alexander Central High School (Taylorsville)

=== Middle schools ===
- East Alexander Middle School (Hiddenite)
- West Alexander Middle School (Taylorsville)

=== Elementary schools ===
- Bethlehem Elementary School (Taylorsville)
- Ellendale School of Innovation & Inquiry (Taylorsville)
- Hiddenite Elementary School (Hiddenite)
- Stony Point Elementary School (Stony Point)
- Sugar Loaf Elementary School (Taylorsville)
- Taylorsville Elementary School (Taylorsville)
- Wittenburg Elementary School (Taylorsville)

== See also ==
- List of school districts in North Carolina
- North Carolina State Board of Education
