= ETBC =

ETBC may be:

- East Tennessee Breastfeeding Coalition
- East Texas Billing & Claims
- Europe Tamil Broadcasting Corporation
- Easy TestBench Creator

religious

- East Taylorsville Baptist Church, in Taylorsville, North Carolina
- East Texas Baptist College, now East Texas Baptist University
- East Troy Bible Church, in East Troy, Wisconsin
- East Tucson Baptist Church, in Tucson, Arizona
- El Toro Baptist Church, in Lake Forest, California
