= Alexander Railroad =

Railroad in North Carolina

Overview
- Headquarters: Taylorsville, North Carolina
- Reporting mark: ARC
- Locale: North Carolina
- Dates of operation: 1946–Present
- Predecessor: Southern Railway

Technical
- Track gauge: 4 ft 8 1/2 in (1,435 mm) standard gauge
- Length: 18 miles (29 kilometers)

The Alexander Railroad Company (reporting mark ARC) is a Class III shortline railroad operating in North Carolina. The railroad has 18 miles (29 kilometers) of track that runs northwest from Statesville to Taylorsville, North Carolina.

== History ==
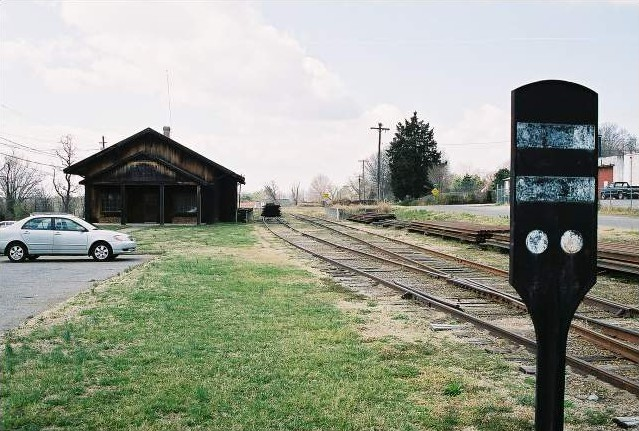
Alexander Railroad headquarters located in Taylorsville, NC.

The Alexander Railroad began operations in 1946. The line was marked for abandonment by the Southern Railway, so local investors and businessmen stepped in, purchasing the 18-mile (29 km) branch line from Statesville to Taylorsville. The railroad is named after Alexander County, North Carolina, although it serves both Alexander and Iredell Counties.

The railroad was originally chartered and built in 1887 as the Statesville & Western, a subsidiary of the Atlantic, Tennessee & Ohio which ran between Charlotte and Statesville, North Carolina. The AT&O was purchased by the Richmond & Danville, and eventually came under the Southern Railway.

== Operations ==
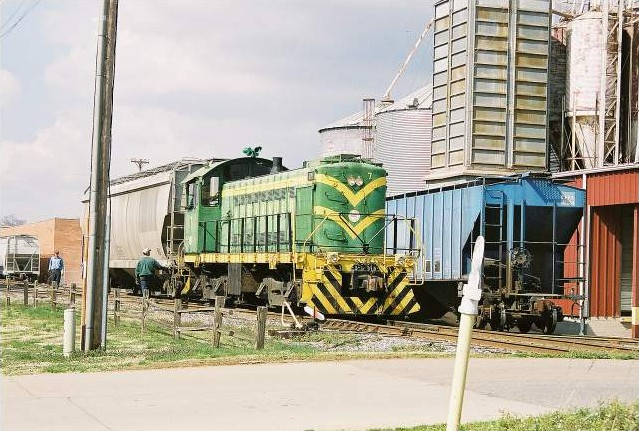
Alexander Railroad #7, Alco S-3, photographed March 11, 2004.

The Alexander Railroad serves 20 customers, handling approximately 2,500 carloads (200,000 tons) per year. Principal commodities carried by the railroad are grain, pulpboard, plastics, lumber products, and scrap paper. The ARC has one connection with Norfolk Southern at Statesville, NC, which sees daily interchange.

== Roster ==
The Alexander Railroad currently has five operating diesel-electric locomotives. The roster includes: #3 - GE 44 tonner, and four EMD SW1500s, #9 and #10 wearing an all over black livery. #11 and #12 wear a more eye catching black and green livery. ARC #11 was photographed working in Taylorsville in March 2013.

The ARC has a locomotive servicing shop in Taylorsville, where four of the railroad's five locomotives are kept. The other one is kept in Statesville for switching the yard.

== See also ==
- Atlantic, Tennessee and Ohio Railroad
- Southern Railway
