= Hiddenite Gem Mines =

Coordinates: 35.9137°N 81.0830°W

Hiddenite, North Carolina, United States, is a centre for the mining of gemstones. Three larger mines found there are Adams Mine, NAEM and the Emerald Hollow Mine. They are collectively known as the Hiddenite Gem Mines.

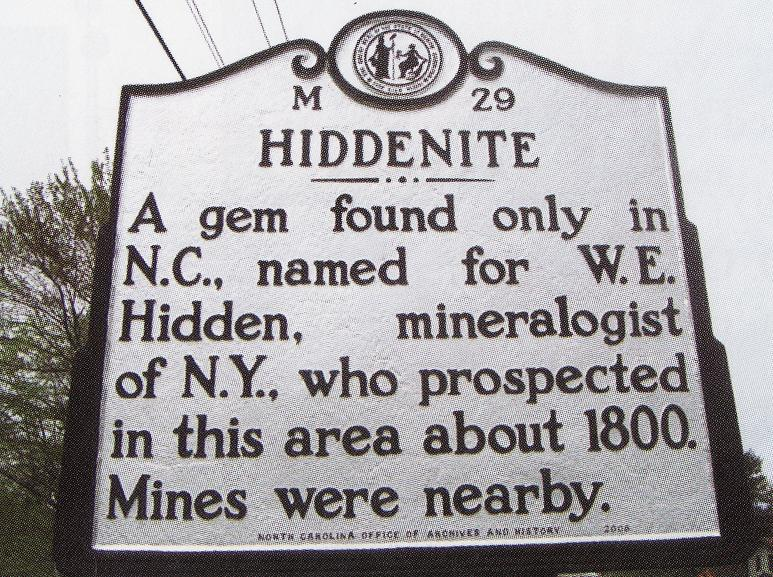
Sign upon Entering Hiddenite, NC

== Discovery ==
The first discovery of the hiddenite stone was made in 1879 by W. E. Hidden. Samples were sent to Dr. J. Lawrence Smith in Louisville, Kentucky, who determined that the stone Hidden had collected was spodumene. The variety was given the name hiddenite. Emeralds had earlier been found during ploughing in 1874.

== Emerald Hollow Mine ==
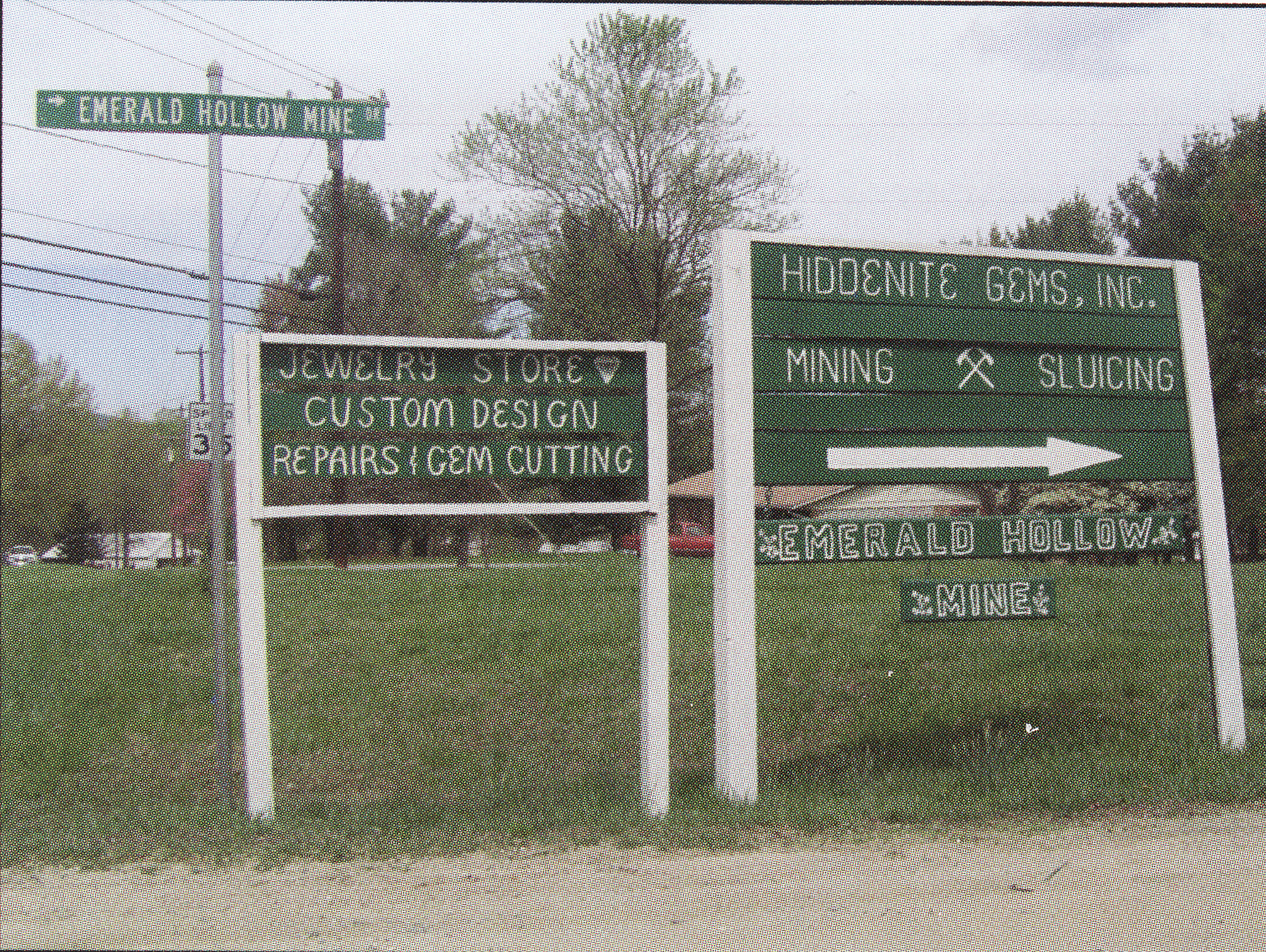
Entrance to the Emerald Hollow Mine, located at Emerald Hollow Mine Drive, Hiddenite, NC

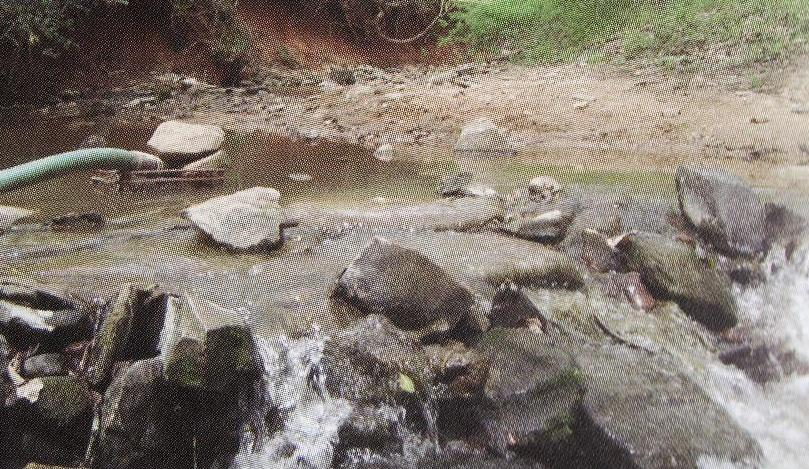
Open stream where tourists search for gems

One of the major mines in the county is the Emerald Hollow Mine. This a public gem mine located in the Piedmont of North Carolina in Alexander County, specifically in the town of Hiddenite.

At the mine, more than 63 types of gems and minerals can be found including emeralds, amethyst, sapphire, aquamarine, topaz, garnet, as well as the stone hiddenite, which is a stone only found in this local area. Gems can be uncovered in this mine are by sluicing, creeking, or digging.

Visitors of the mine are allowed to dig in search for gemstones. The creek is a major part of the mine. Guests are allowed to enter the mountain creek water to search for valuable stones.

The mine has an on-site lapidary shop where gem stones can be cleaned, finished, and made into jewelry.

== Rist Mine (North American Emerald Mine) ==
Another major mine is the North American Emerald Mine (NAEM), operated privately. Previously known as Rist Mine, this is a location mined by James K. Hill who is the founder of North American Emerald Mines Inc. At the mine more than 30,000 carats (6.0 kg) of emeralds have been found, estimated value US$9 million. For excavating the stones, large, modern, and professional equipment is used.

=== Emeralds found ===
In 1969, an emerald of 1,438 carats (0.2876 kg) was uncovered, the largest yet found in North America. The stone was named the Stephenson Emerald in honor of John A. D. Stephenson, a late 19th-century collector instrumental in the discovery of the first North Carolina emerald and the first world discovery of hiddenite.

In 2003, a larger emerald was uncovered at the NAEM by Jamie Hill. It was 1,869 carats (0.3738 kg) and valued at over one million dollars.

In 2006, NAEM unearthed a yet larger emerald, said to be 10 inches in length.

== Adams Mine ==
Also located in the hills of Hiddenite are the Adams mine, formerly known as the Warren mine, the Emerald & Hiddenite mine, the Turner mine, and the Hiddenite mine.

=== Other discoveries ===
In 1882, an emerald crystal of 1,276 carats (0.2552 kg) was discovered. At the time, this was largest emerald crystal ever found in North America. However, it was stolen from the American Museum of Natural History, NY, in 1950 and never recovered.

In 1971, approximately 9,400 carats (1.88 kg) of emeralds were found the area. Some of these stones are now displayed in the Smithsonian.

In 1980 over 1,500 hiddenite crystals were found in a large underground vein pocket.
