= Taylorsville Times =

- Type: Weekly newspaper
- Owner: Sharpe family
- Founded: 1886
- Language: English
- Headquarters: 24 East Main Ave, Taylorsville, North Carolina United States
- Circulation: 6,500
- OCLC number: 38452787
- Website: taylorsvilletimes.com

Taylorsville Times is a weekly newspaper based in Taylorsville, North Carolina covering Alexander County.
