= Brzykcy =

Brzykcy is a surname. Notable people with the surname include:

- Lauren Brzykcy (born 1999), American soccer player
- Zach Brzykcy (born 1999), American baseball pitcher
