= Hiddenite =

Yellowish or greenish green mineral

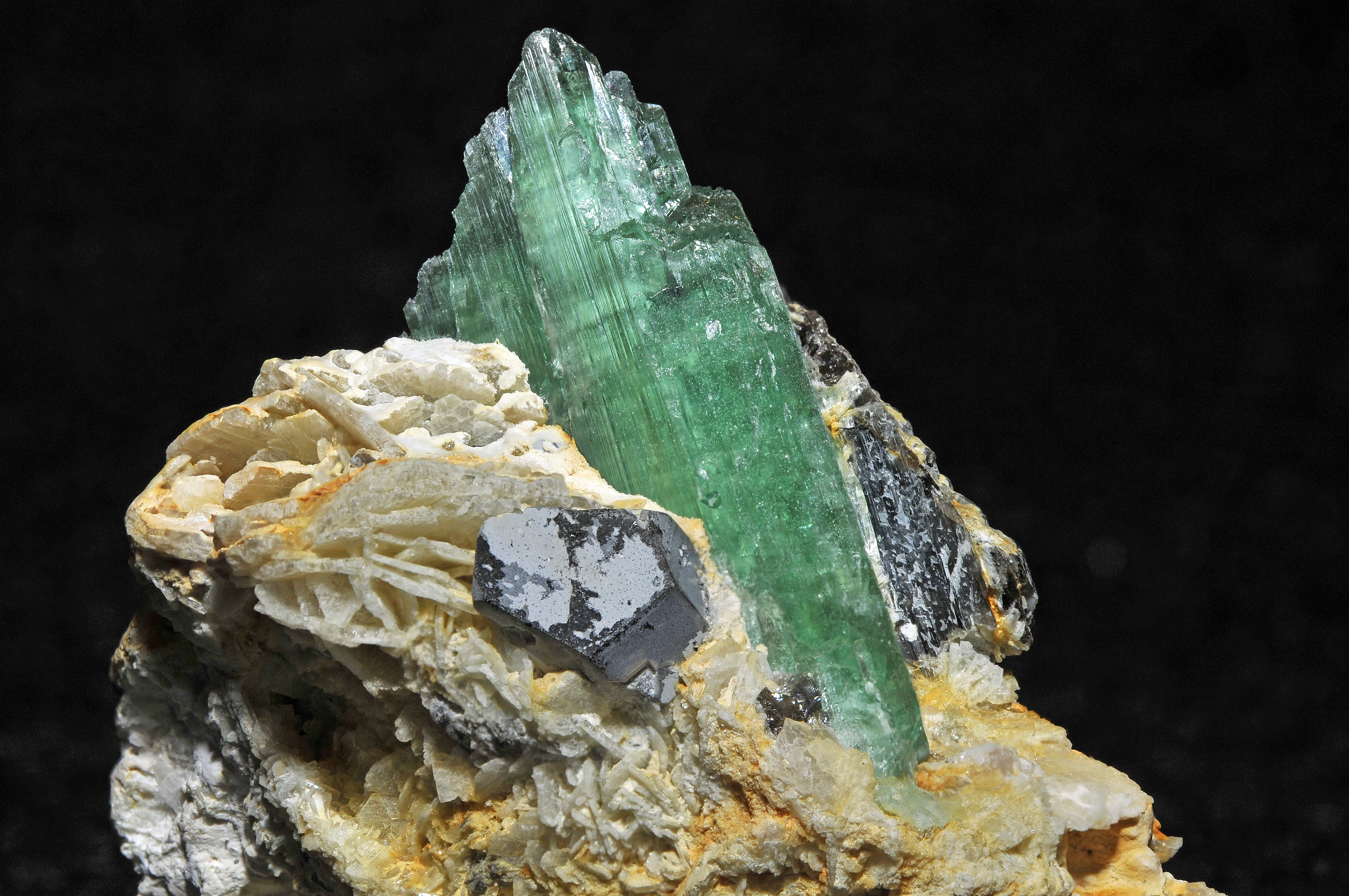
Hiddenite

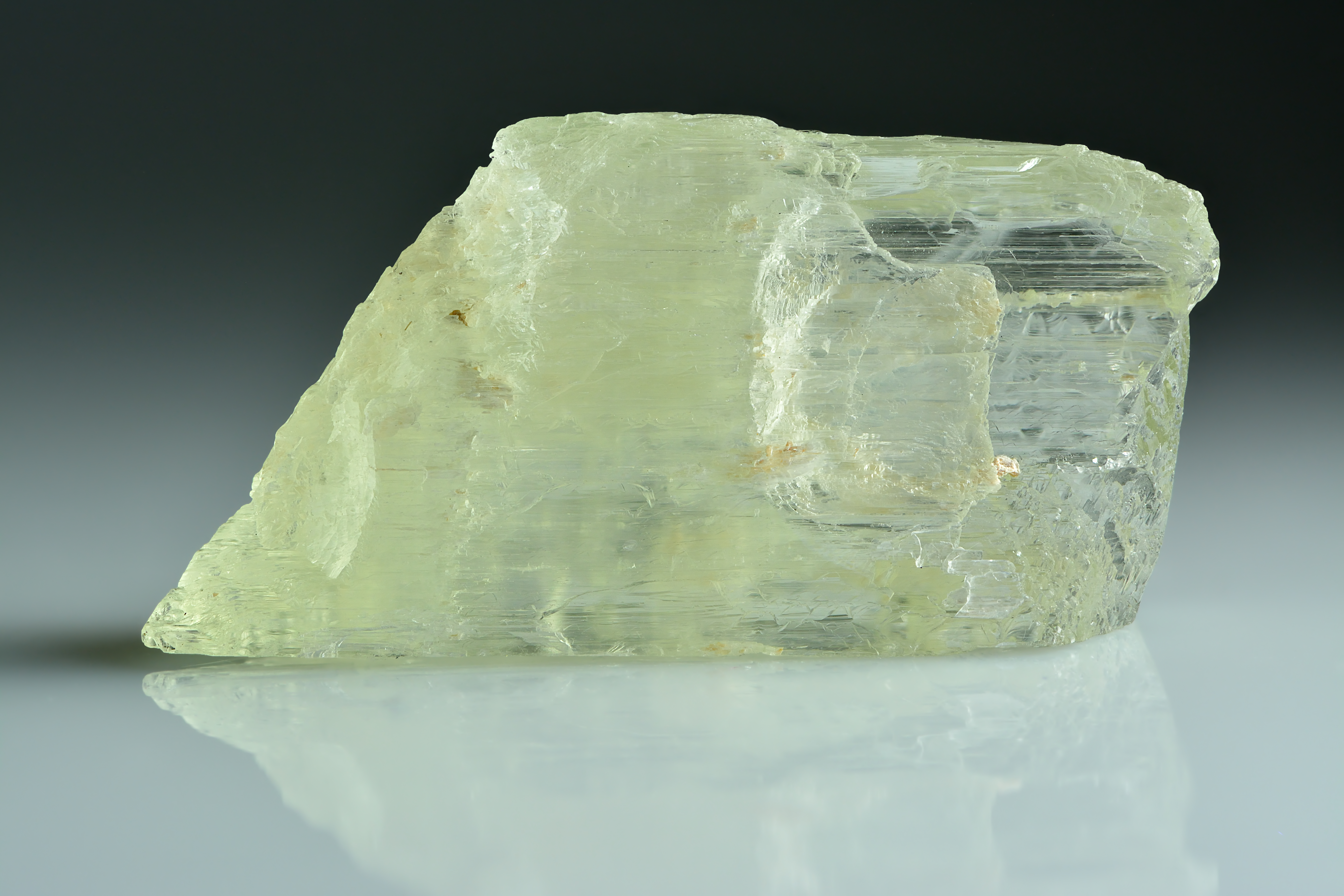
Hiddenite

Hiddenite is a pale-to-emerald green variety of spodumene that is sometimes used as a gemstone.

The first specimens of the hiddenite variety of spodumene were recovered circa 1879 near the settlement of White Plains, west of Stony Point, Alexander County, North Carolina. According to contemporary accounts, a man named Lackey brought them to the attention of J.A.D. Stephenson, a local merchant who was a collector of minerals. Initially, the yellowish to greenish-yellow hiddenites were thought to be gemmy diopside. Stephenson brought the discovery to the attention of exploration geologist William Earl Hidden, who had been commissioned by Thomas Edison to seek sources of platinum in North Carolina (an effort that was unsuccessful). Hidden sent samples of the odd green material to J. Lawrence Smith, a prominent chemist and mineralogist in Louisville, Kentucky. Smith correctly identified the specimens as being a variety of spodumene and named them "hiddenite" in honor of Hidden. The community in which the gemstones were first found was later renamed "Hiddenite". During the heyday of hiddenite mining in the 1880s and 1890s it was also known as "lithia emerald".

Hidden recognized the value of the emeralds and the potential of the new gemmy green spodumene. He acquired a tract of poor quality land, which was either the site of the initial discovery or near to it, for $1500. The Emerald and Hiddenite Mining Company was organized and excavations on the site recovered loose hiddenites and emeralds in the red, gravelly clay. At a depth of about 26 feet they struck bedrock, and soon were recovering hiddenites from solid rock. Oddly, period newspaper accounts and statements by George Frederick Kunz (1892) indicate that mining on the site was never undertaken as a full-time operation, but was only prosecuted a few weeks or months during the summer.

Writing in 1892, Kunz described the hiddenite being recovered as "always transparent, ranges from colorless (rare) to a light yellow, into a yellowish green, then into a deep yellow emerald green. Sometimes an entire crystal has a uniform green color, but generally one end is yellow and the other green." Kunz noted that the finest crystal recovered prior to 1892 measured 68 mm tall, and could have cut a gem of 5.5ct estimated weight. The size of most cut gems were small, with a 2ct hiddenite in the Augustus C. Hamlin collection being considered among the finest of the large stones.

The coloring agent is chromium. Colors can gradually fade. Hiddenite has a strong vitreous luster and displays strong colors due to pleochroism.

In addition to the North Carolina locality, Hiddenite has been found in Brazil, China, and Madagascar. Green spodumene found in Afghanistan and Pakistan has excited modest amounts of controversy in the mineral and gemological communities with debate over whether or not it should be truly considered "hiddenite" as well as claims that the green coloration is induced by irradiation and is fugitive.

Deposits occur in granite pegmatite.
