= Taylorsville Milling Company Roller Mill =

- U.S. National Register of Historic Places
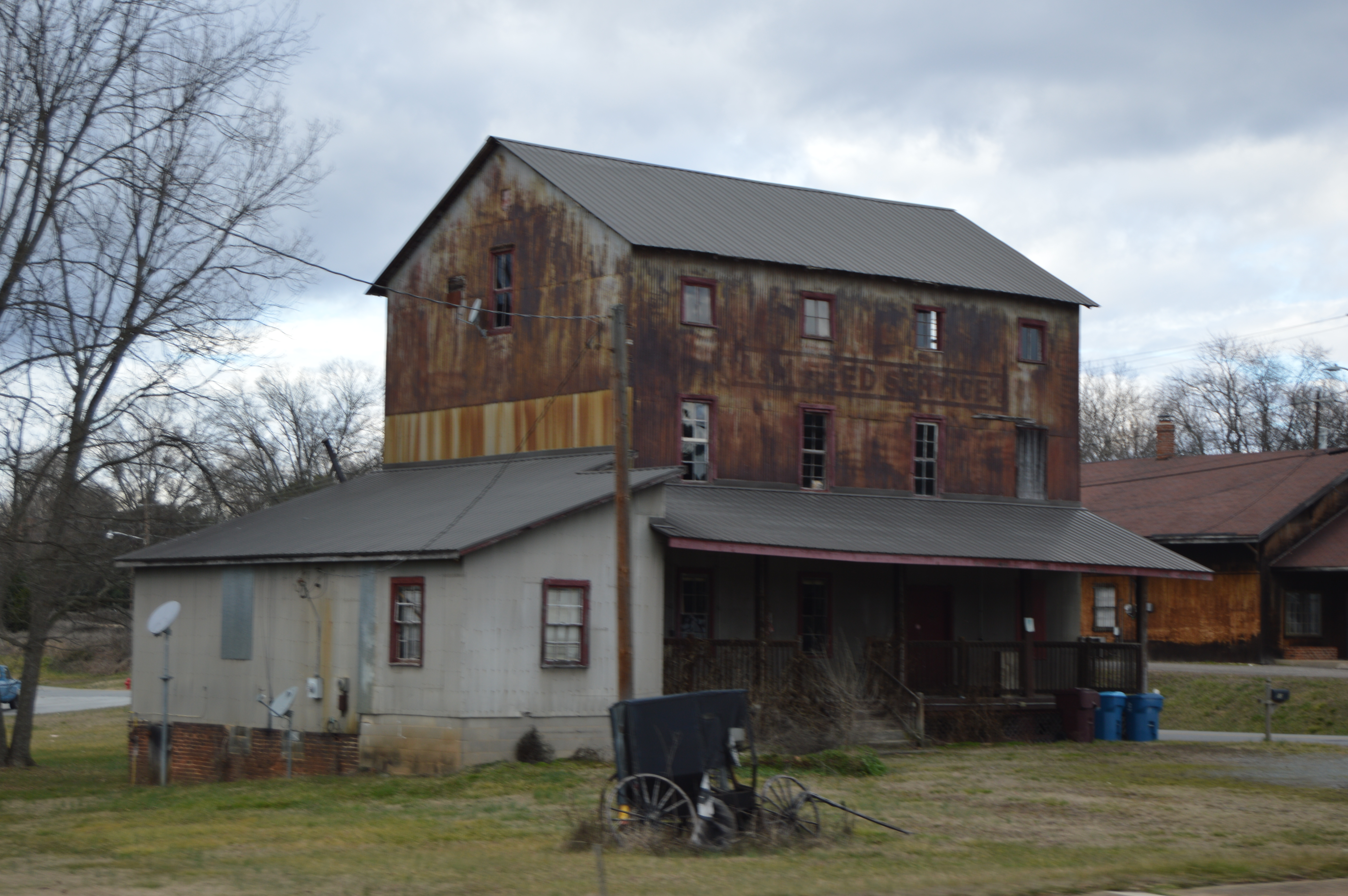
- Location: Taylorsville, North Carolina
- Built: 1902
- NRHP reference No.: 100004324
- Added to NRHP: 08/27/2019

The Taylorsville Milling Company Roller Mill is a historic manufacturing facility located in Taylorsville, North Carolina. It is one of the few surviving early 20th-century grain-processing facilities in the United States.

== History ==
The mill was first constructed in 1902 to house a grist milling operation. The west wing was constructed between 1924 and 1938 and initially served as an office before being used for production and storage.

Taylorsville Milling Company was incorporated on February 26, 1902. Construction on the mill followed the week after. The mill began producing flour and feed for household use on July 10, 1902. In 1904, the mill produced 15,650 barrels of flour and of meal bushels, making it the county's largest milling enterprise.

In 1924, the mill upgraded from a steam-powered system to electric machinery. In 1933, due to delinquent tax payments, the mill was purchased by Rom L. Moore for $700. In 1961, 1975, and 2007, the mill was sold to new owners. Before 2007, the building had been largely vacant, but was then turned into an antiques store. In 2018, A&M Feed Service bought the mill to turn it into a restaurant.
