= Atlantic, Tennessee and Ohio Railroad =

Overview
- Locale: North Carolina
- Dates of operation: 1860–1863–1871–1894
- Successor: Southern Railway Company

Technical
- Track gauge: 4 ft 8 1/2 in (1,435 mm) standard gauge
- Previous gauge: 5 ft (1,524 mm); American Civil War era and changed to 4 ft 9 in (1,448 mm) in 1886

The Atlantic, Tennessee and Ohio Railroad Company in North Carolina was incorporated under act of Tennessee on February 26, 1852, and under act of North Carolina on February 15, 1855, as Atlantic, Tennessee and Ohio Railroad Company. The name of the company was changed to Atlantic, Tennessee and Ohio Railroad Company in North Carolina on February 23, 1861.

The railroad completed construction of 45.29 miles (72.89 km) of 5 ft (1,524 mm) gauge railroad line between Charlotte, North Carolina, and Statesville, North Carolina, in 1860. Some time in 1863, the Confederate States of America dismantled the railroad and used it in construction of the Piedmont Railroad as a matter of military necessity. With the assistance of $147,000 in bonds of the State of North Carolina, authorized by act of the legislature ratified February 3, 1869, the railroad line was reconstructed. It was reopened on June 22, 1871.

The property of the Atlantic, Tennessee and Ohio Railroad Company in North Carolina was operated by its own organization from 1860 to 1863 and from June 22, 1871, to September 30, 1881, by the Charlotte, Columbia and Augusta Railroad Company from October 1, 1881, to April 30, 1886, by The Richmond and Danville Railroad Company from May 1, 1886, to June 14, 1892, and by the receivers of The Richmond and Danville Railroad Company from June 15, 1892, to June 30, 1894.

The Atlantic, Tennessee and Ohio Railroad Company in North Carolina was sold to Southern Railway Company on June 26, 1894. Southern Railway Company began to operate the property on July 1, 1894.

== See also ==
- Confederate railroads in the American Civil War
- Alexander Railroad
