= Alexander Central High School =

American public school in North Carolina

Location
- 223 School Drive; Taylorsville, North Carolina 28681; United States; 35°55′05″N 81°11′25″W

Information
- Type: Public
- School district: Alexander County Schools
- CEEB code: 343938
- NCES School ID: 370009000028
- Principal: Brian Lewis
- Teaching staff: 84.65 (FTE)
- Enrollment: 1,248 (2023–2024)
- Student to teacher ratio: 14.74
- Campus type: Rural
- Colors: Blue and Vegas gold
- Athletics: NCHSAA 6A
- Athletics conference: Northwestern 6A/7A
- Mascot: Cougars
- Yearbook: The Alexcentrian
- Feeder schools: East Alexander Middle School, West Alexander Middle School
- Website: achs.alexander.k12.nc.us

Alexander Central High School (ACHS) is a public, co-educational secondary school located in Taylorsville, North Carolina. It is the only high school in the Alexander County Schools system.

== History ==
Alexander Central was expanded in 2001 to double in size. Construction was completed in just one year.

== Demographics ==
For the 2010–2011 school year, Alexander Central High School had a total population of 1,714 students and 94.43 staff on a (FTE) basis.

== Administration ==
The principal of the school is Brian Lewis. He started in 2011 and was previously principal of West Caldwell High School in Lenoir, North Carolina.

== Athletics ==
Alexander Central is a member of the North Carolina High School Athletic Association (NCHSAA) and is classified as a 6A school. It is a part of the Northwestern 6A/7A Conference. The school colors are blue and vegas gold, and its team name is the Cougars.

The school competes in various sports throughout the school year. Fall sports include cheerleading, cross country, football, girls golf, boys soccer, girls tennis, and volleyball. Winter sports include boys and girls basketball, cheerleading, indoor track and field, swimming, and wrestling. Spring sports include baseball, boys golf, girls soccer, softball, boys tennis, and outdoor track & field.

The school softball team has had a history of success, winning NCHSAA state championships in 1979, 1991, 1994, 1995, 1996, 2009, 2011, 2013, 2014, and 2018.

== Extracurricular activities ==
Alexander Central High School has many extracurricular activities for students to participate in:

- The Actor's Attic
- The Alexander Muse, a yearly magazine of student art and writing.
- Art Club
- Chess Club
- Family, Career and Community Leaders of America (FCCLA)
- Fellowship of Christian Athletes (FCA)
- Future Farmers of America (FFA)
- Future Business Leaders of America (FBLA)
- Future Teachers of America (FTA)
- Health Occupations Students of America (HOSA)
- History Club
- Interact Club
- Junior Beta Club
- Latin Dance
- LEO Club
- Minority Awareness
- National Beta Club
- SkillsUSA
- Spanish Club
- Step Team
- Student Council
- Teen Poetry Happens

=== Yearbook ===
The yearbook of ACHS is called the Alexcentrian. In 2003, it won a yearbook award from the North Carolina Scholastic Media Association.

=== Other activities ===
An atlas created by the Geographic Information Services (GIS) class at ACHS was published in 2007. Instructor, and county IT director, Eric Walker worked with the county's GIS department head, George Brown, for assistance in the project. Originally planned as just a 60-page booklet, the Alexander County Mapbook is a 160-page atlas of the county divided into seven sections: geography, history, government, education, economy, retail and arts and recreation.

The Agricultural Education program was awarded a $3,300 grant by Lowe's Home Improvement during the 2011–2012 to build an aquaculture facility at the school. Along with learning about safe food supplies and alternatives to natural river fishing, students will learn about conversion of fish waste to plant food.

== Notable alumni ==
- Zach Brzykcy, MLB pitcher
- Kyle Troup, professional ten-pin bowler
- Onur Tukel, filmmaker
