= History of the Hmong in North Carolina =

The Hmong people are a major ethnic group living in North Carolina. According to the American FactFinder, there were 10,864 Hmong living in North Carolina, with about 5,133 living in and around the Hickory–Lenoir–Morganton Metropolitan Statistical Area.

== History ==
The history of Hmong immigration to the United States largely begins in the 1970s and 1980s after the Vietnam War. Our Lady of the Angels Catholic church in Marion, North Carolina sponsored two refugee families, and First Methodist Church followed suit. However, it was Rev. Allen McKinney of Marion's Garden Creek Baptist Church who was the driving force and encouraged larger resettlement to the region. Hmong families who had been resettled in areas like Fresno, California and Philadelphia soon joined relatives in North Carolina.

The Hmong were drawn to the mountainous part of Western North Carolina due to its geographic similarity to Laos. Additionally, many found manufacturing work at sites around the region.

The arrival of the Hmong to North Carolina was not without its challenges. Some locals viewed the refugees with suspicion, and rumors about the Hmong spread in the community. Rev. McKinney, working closely with Hmong community leader Kue Chaw, helped address these misconceptions.

== Today ==
Today the Hmong are an important part of the cultural and economic makeup of the region, with their own churches, restaurants and markets. North Carolina now has the fourth largest Hmong population in the United States, behind California, Minnesota and Wisconsin. Many second-generation immigrants have encouraged their peers and younger generations to pursue higher education. University of North Carolina, Greensboro, University of North Carolina, Charlotte and Appalachian State University all have Hmong Student Associations on campus to help build community. Additionally, DigitalNC, a project of the state Department of Natural and Cultural Resources, UNC Chapel Hill Library, and the North Carolina Digital Heritage Center initiated a project called Hmong Keeb Kwm: The Hmong Heritage Project. This project is aimed at maintaining the special history of the Hmong in North Carolina.
