= Zach Brzykcy =

American baseball player (born 1999)

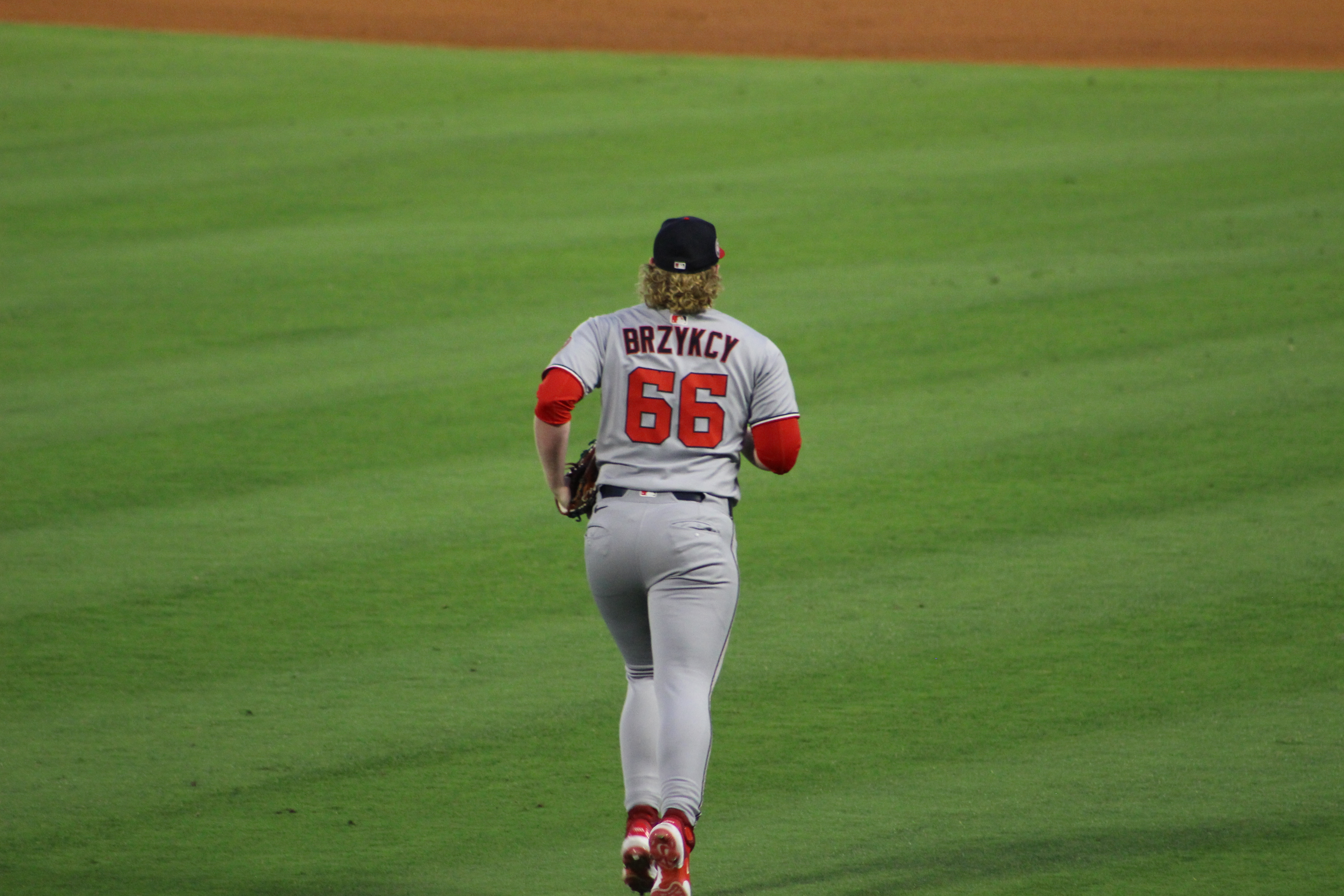
- Brzycky with the Washington Nationals in 2025

Free agent
- Relief pitcher
- Born: July 12, 1999 (age 27); Hickory, North Carolina, U.S.
- Bats: Right Throws: Right

MLB debut
- September 1, 2024, for the Washington Nationals

MLB statistics (through 2026 season)
- Win–loss record: 0–1
- Earned run average: 9.38
- Strikeouts: 30
- Stats at Baseball Reference

Teams
- Washington Nationals (2024–2025); Miami Marlins (2026)

Zachary John-William Brzykcy (/ˈbrɪksiː/ BRIK-see, born July 12, 1999) is an American professional baseball pitcher who is a free agent. He has played in Major League Baseball (MLB) for the Washington Nationals and Miami Marlins.

== Career ==
Brzykcy attended Alexander Central High School in Taylorsville, North Carolina, where he was named Northwestern Conference Pitcher of the Year in 2017. He played collegiate baseball at Virginia Tech, where he was the regular closer for the Hokies. He also played in the Cape Cod Baseball League during the summer of 2019, leading the league that summer with seven saves for the Falmouth Commodores.

=== Washington Nationals ===
With the 2020 Major League Baseball draft shortened to just five rounds, despite ranking as the 180th-best draft prospect in 2020 according to MLB Pipeline, Brzykcy went undrafted. Brzykcy was scouted by longtime Washington Nationals scout Bobby Myrick and chose to sign with the Nationals as an undrafted free agent on July 1, 2020. He did not play in a game in 2020 due to the cancellation of the minor league season because of the COVID-19 pandemic.

In 2021, Brzykcy spent the year with the High–A Wilmington Blue Rocks. He earned his first win on May 12, 2021, striking out seven in four scoreless relief innings. In 28 appearances, Brzykcy compiled a 6–4 record and 5.20 ERA with 86 strikeouts across 62 1/3 innings pitched. He split the 2022 campaign between Wilmington, the Double–A Harrisburg Senators, and Triple–A Rochester Red Wings. In 51 appearances out of the bullpen for the three affiliates, Brzykcy registered an 8–2 record and 1.76 ERA with 95 strikeouts and 14 saves over 61 1/3 innings. Brzykcy underwent Tommy John surgery in April 2023, and missed the entirety of the season as a result.

On November 14, 2023, the Nationals added Brzykcy to their 40-man roster to protect him from the Rule 5 draft. He was optioned to the Triple–A Rochester Red Wings to begin the 2024 season. On September 1, 2024, Brzykcy was promoted to the major leagues for the first time. He made six appearances for Washington during his rookie campaign, posting a 14.29 ERA with four strikeouts across 5 2/3 innings pitched.

Brzykcy made 26 appearances out of the bullpen for the Nationals in 2025, but struggled to an 0–1 record and 9.00 ERA with 24 strikeouts over 23 innings of work.

=== Miami Marlins ===
On November 6, 2025, Brzykcy was claimed off waivers by the Miami Marlins. On December 5, Brzykcy was removed from the 40-man roster and sent outright to the Triple-A Jacksonville Jumbo Shrimp. In 17 appearances for Jacksonville to begin the year, he logged a 2-1 record and 5.24 ERA with 26 strikeouts and one save. On June 1, 2026, the Marlins selected Brzykcy's contract, adding him to their active roster. On October 30, he was sent outright to Triple-A and subsequently elected free agency.

== Pitching style ==
On the mound, Brzykcy is a right-handed pitcher noted for a fastball that has been clocked up to 100 miles per hour (160 km/h), although it typically registers in the mid-90s. He complements that primary pitch with a sharp breaking ball.
