= Hiddenite, North Carolina =

- Census-designated place
- Location within North Carolina
- Coordinates: 35°54′19″N 81°05′10″W
- Country: United States
- State: North Carolina
- County: Alexander
- Incorporated: 1913 (inactive)
- Named after: William Hidden

Area
  - Total: 1.60 sq mi (4.14 km^{2})
  - Land: 1.59 sq mi (4.12 km^{2})
  - Water: 0.012 sq mi (0.03 km^{2})
- Elevation: 1,093 ft (333 m)

Population (2020)
  - Total: 507
  - Density: 319.0/sq mi (123.15/km^{2})
- Time zone: UTC-5 (Eastern (EST))
  - Summer (DST): UTC-4 (EDT)
- ZIP code: 28636
- FIPS code: 37-31260
- GNIS feature ID: 2628635

Hiddenite is a census-designated place (CDP) in east-central Alexander County, North Carolina, United States. As of the 2020 census, Hiddenite had a population of 507. It is part of the Hickory–Lenoir–Morganton Metropolitan Statistical Area.

== History ==
The town of Hiddenite was incorporated in 1913, but its charter was repealed in 1919. Hiddenite was named for William Earl Hidden (1853–1918), a mineralogist sent to North Carolina by Thomas Edison to look for platinum. Hidden discovered the gem that came to be known as "hiddenite" in 1879 in mines nearby. Until recently it was found only in Alexander County, North Carolina, but in recent decades it has been subsequently found in Madagascar and Brazil.

The Hiddenite Gem Mines and surrounding areas also yield emeralds, sapphires, and many other precious stones. Sluicing and digging for precious gems is a popular recreational activity that draws many visitors to the area.

Prior to the arrival of W.E. Hidden, the community was known as White Plains; this is how the area appears on a map of 1871. Hiddenite was once noted as a health resort because of its sulfur springs.

Hiddenite's altitude is 1,160 feet (350 m) above sea level. The community is also a poultry producer.

The Lucas Mansion was listed on the National Register of Historic Places in 1982.

== Geography ==
According to the United States Census Bureau, the CDP has a total area of 1.6 square miles (4.1 km^{2}), of which 0.0039 square miles (0.01 km^{2}), or 0.32%, is water. The CDP is located along North Carolina Highway 90, 5 miles (8 km) east of Taylorsville, the county seat, and 15 miles (24 km) northwest of Statesville. U.S. Route 64 bypasses Hiddenite to the south.

In 2020, during the heavy rains of Tropical Storm Eta in the area, the Hiddenite Bridge split apart.

== Demographics ==
Historical population
Census	Pop.	Note	%±
2020	507		—
U.S. Decennial Census

== Hiddenite Celebration of the Arts ==
The Hiddenite Celebration of the Arts is held on the fourth Saturday in September. The event begins at 9 a.m. and concludes at 4 p.m. The Celebration invites people to see and participate in arts and crafts from different cultures. The main culture is the folk ways of North Carolina. Hispanic and Hmong folkways are also celebrated. The event is full of entertainment and food from around Alexander County. The annual Hiddenite Half-Marathon is held at the same time. The event is 13.1 miles long and begins at Pleasant Hill Baptist Church; the finish line is marked in front of the Lucas Mansion. Anyone can participate in this event and trophies are given to those who place.

== Notable person ==
Elbert "Yoneq" Eugene Spriggs, founder of the Twelve Tribes communities was a resident of Hiddenite in the years prior to his death at the group's Hiddenite campus.
