= Lucas Mansion =

Historic house in North Carolina, United States

- U.S. National Register of Historic Places
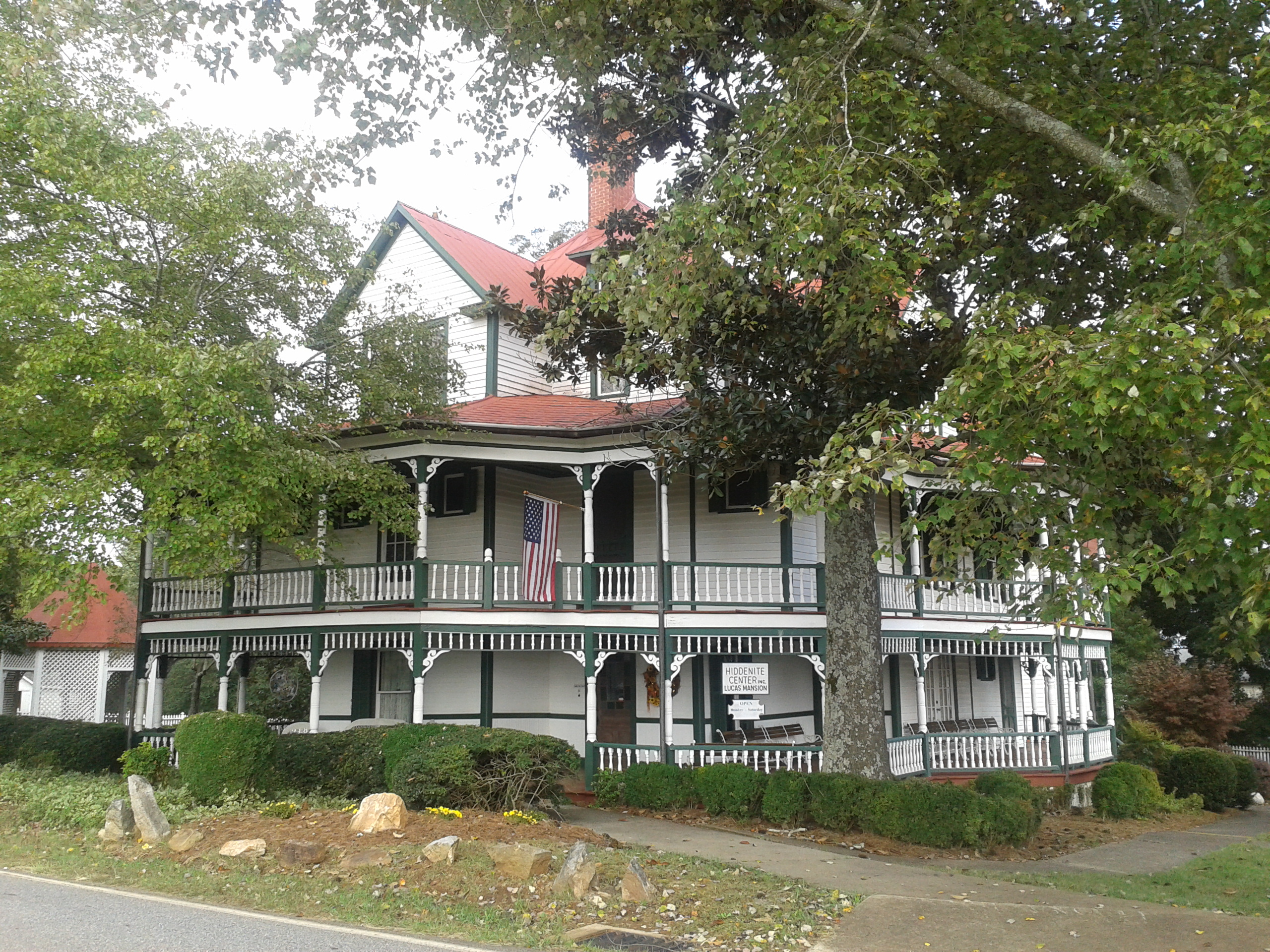
- The Lucas Mansion in October, 2017

- Location within North Carolina Location within the United States
- Location: Church St., Hiddenite, North Carolina
- Coordinates: 35°54′25″N 81°5′30″W
- Area: less than one acre
- Built: 1900-1928
- Architectural style: Queen Anne
- NRHP reference No.: 82001279
- Added to NRHP: December 2, 1982

The Lucas Mansion, also known as the Hiddenite Center, is a historic home located at Hiddenite, Alexander County, North Carolina. It was built about 1900, and is a three-story, frame Queen Anne style dwelling. It features a two-story wraparound porch. It was enlarged to its present size by 1928. Local tradition says the house was enlarged twice by raising the existing floor and building a new floor beneath or between the existing floors. The house roughly follows a cruciform plan, though the plan varies from floor to floor. It was owned by James Paul Lucas, a South Carolina native and international diamond merchant.

It was listed on the National Register of Historic Places in 1982.

In 1981, Eileen Sharpe and R.Y Sharpe purchased the mansion and established the Hiddenite Center. The Hiddenite Center has restored the first floor of the Lucas Mansion with period furnishings and a collection of local gemstones and minerals. The second floor is used as a regional art gallery and includes a gift shop. The third floor features a large collection of dolls on display.
