= Stony Point, North Carolina =

- Census-designated place
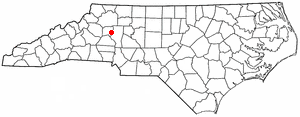
- Location of Stony Point, North Carolina
- Coordinates: 35°52′01″N 81°02′49″W
- Country: United States
- State: North Carolina
- Counties: Alexander, Iredell
- Settled: 1789
- Named for: Rock formation

Area
  - Total: 2.99 sq mi (7.74 km^{2})
  - Land: 2.98 sq mi (7.72 km^{2})
  - Water: 0.0077 sq mi (0.02 km^{2})
- Elevation: 1,037 ft (316 m)

Population (2020)
  - Total: 1,146
  - Density: 384.7/sq mi (148.54/km^{2})
- Time zone: UTC-5 (Eastern (EST))
  - Summer (DST): UTC-4 (EDT)
- ZIP code: 28678
- Area code: 704
- FIPS code: 37-65260
- GNIS feature ID: 2402898

Stony Point is a census-designated place (CDP) in Alexander and Iredell counties in the U.S. state of North Carolina. As of the 2020 census, Stony Point had a population of 1,146. It is part of the Hickory–Lenoir–Morganton Metropolitan Statistical Area.

== History ==
A Stony Point Post Office was established on February 17, 1826 in Iredell County, with James Thompson as postmaster. The name was changed to Stony Point in 1832. The Stony Point populated place has existed in both Alexander and Iredell Counties since 1847, when Alexander County was created.

== Geography ==
According to the United States Census Bureau, the CDP has a total area of 3.0 square miles (7.7 km^{2}), of which 0.0077 square miles (0.02 km^{2}), or 0.30%, is water.

== Demographics ==
Historical population
Census	Pop.	Note	%±
2020	1,146		—
U.S. Decennial Census

As of the census of 2000, there were 1,380 people, 552 households, and 399 families residing in the CDP. The population density was 462.5 inhabitants per square mile (178.6/km^{2}). There were 601 housing units at an average density of 201.4 per square mile (77.8/km^{2}). The racial makeup of the CDP was 92.03% White, 3.77% African American, 0.72% Native American, 2.03% from other races, and 1.45% from two or more races. Hispanic or Latino of any race were 3.19% of the population.

There were 552 households, out of which 30.1% had children under the age of 18 living with them, 54.2% were married couples living together, 12.3% had a female householder with no husband present, and 27.7% were non-families. 23.6% of all households were made up of individuals, and 9.8% had someone living alone who was 65 years of age or older. The average household size was 2.50 and the average family size was 2.92.

In the CDP, the population was spread out, with 24.9% under the age of 18, 7.7% from 18 to 24, 29.2% from 25 to 44, 25.9% from 45 to 64, and 12.2% who were 65 years of age or older. The median age was 37 years. For every 100 females, there were 92.5 males. For every 100 females age 18 and over, there were 90.4 males.

The median income for a household in the CDP was $42,305, and the median income for a family was $48,221. Males had a median income of $26,635 versus $20,774 for females. The per capita income for the CDP was $17,303. About 11.0% of families and 15.0% of the population were below the poverty line, including 28.2% of those under age 18 and 29.1% of those age 65 or over.

== School districts ==
- Elementary School
  - Stony Point Elementary
  - Sharon Elementary
- Junior High School - East Alexander Middle School
- High School
  - Alexander Central High School
  - West Iredell High School

== Notable person ==
- Dave Jolly – former MLB pitcher
