= Alexander County, North Carolina =

County in North Carolina, United States

- County
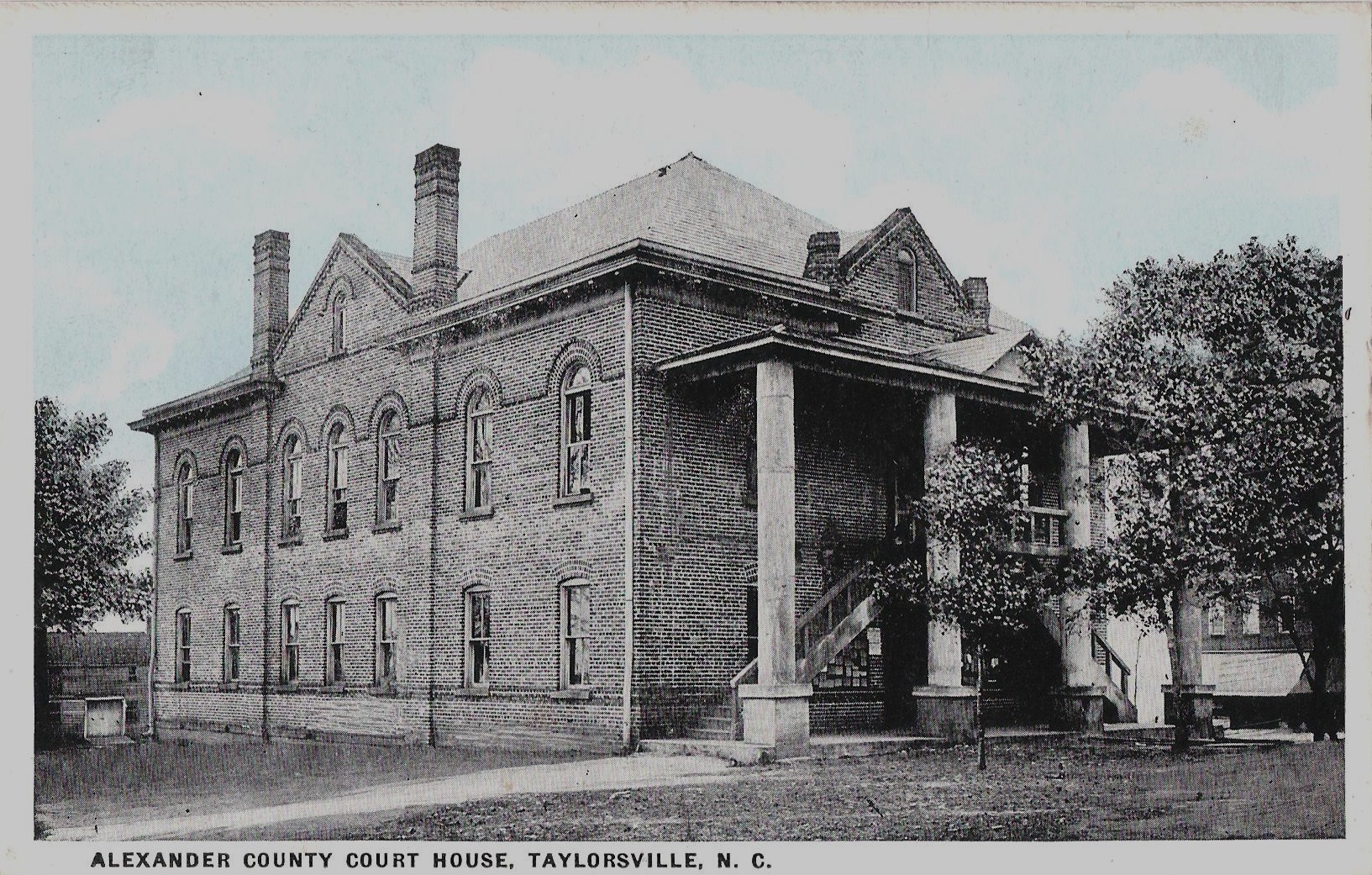
- Alexander County Courthouse

- Flag Seal
- Motto: "A wonderful place to live, work and play."
- Location within the U.S. state of North Carolina
- Interactive map of Alexander County, North Carolina
- Coordinates: 35.92°N 81.18°W
- Country: United States
- State: North Carolina
- Founded: 1847
- Named for: William Julius Alexander
- Seat: Taylorsville
- Largest community: Bethlehem

Area
  - Total: 263.64 sq mi (682.8 km^{2})
  - Land: 259.99 sq mi (673.4 km^{2})
  - Water: 3.65 sq mi (9.5 km^{2}) 1.39%

Population (2020)
  - Total: 36,444
  - Estimate (2025): 36,958 ▲
  - Density: 140.17/sq mi (54.12/km^{2})
- Time zone: UTC−5 (Eastern)
  - Summer (DST): UTC−4 (EDT)
- Congressional district: 5th
- Website: alexandercountync.gov

Alexander County is a county established in the U.S. state of North Carolina in 1847. As of the 2020 census, the population was 36,444. Its county seat is Taylorsville. Alexander County is part of the Hickory-Lenoir-Morganton, NC Metropolitan Statistical Area.

== History ==
Alexander County was formed in 1847 from portions of what were then Iredell County (formed in 1788 from Rowan County), Caldwell County (formed from Burke County in 1841), and Wilkes County (formed from Surry County and Washington District in 1771).

Alexander County was named for William Julius Alexander who was a Speaker of the North Carolina House of Commons. This Piedmont area was settled primarily by farmers, many of Scots-Irish descent, as well as German descent in the southern section of Alexander County.

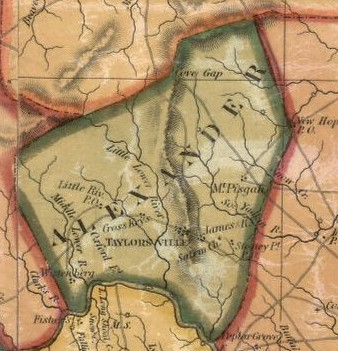
Alexander County, North Carolina Map from 1854

The county was established by two acts of the North Carolina General Assembly, one ratified on January 15 and one ratified on January 18, 1847. These acts were not to take effect until it was determined that Caldwell County would have 5,000 people in it. On August 10–11, 1847, the first sale of land in the county seat (Taylorsville) took place. Taylorsville is the namesake of either John Louis Taylor, Carolina agriculturist and political philosopher, or General Zachary Taylor, the twelfth president of the United States. With the proceeds from the sale, the county built the first courthouse on the present site.

When the American Civil War began in 1861, Alexander County was fourteen years old. The court house records in Taylorsville were destroyed by troops under Major General George Stoneman in a raid on Easter Sunday in 1865.

The Alexander Railroad based in Taylorsville began in 1946, with one connection to Norfolk Southern in Statesville, North Carolina. The short line rail system operates between Taylorsville and Statesville.

== Geography ==
According to the U.S. Census Bureau, the county has a total area of 263.64 square miles (682.8 km^{2}), of which 259.99 square miles (673.4 km^{2}) is land and 3.65 square miles (9.5 km^{2}) (1.39%) is water.

Alexander County is located within the Foothills region of western North Carolina. The county's main geographic feature is the Brushy Mountains, a deeply eroded spur of the Blue Ridge Mountains to the west. The "Brushies," as they are called locally, rise from 300 to 1,000 feet (300 m) above the surrounding countryside, and dominate the county's northern horizon. The highest point in Alexander County is Hickory Knob in the Brushies; it has an elevation of 2,560 feet (780 m) above sea level. Barrett Mountain, an isolated mountain ridge, is in the western part of the county. The remainder of Alexander County's terrain consists of gently rolling countryside. The county's largest river, the Catawba, forms its southern border.

Within Alexander County is the unincorporated town of Hiddenite, the location of a mine that yields emeralds, sapphires, and its namesake stone "hiddenite," a variety of spodumene.

The county is served by US Highway 64, a controlled-access roadway connecting Taylorsville with Lenoir and Statesville. NC Highways 90, 16, and 127 also serve the county. Interstate 40 and 77 are 30 minutes from the majority of county residents. The Charlotte Douglas International Airport is an hour's drive from most parts of the county. The area is also served by the Hickory Regional Airport (30 minutes) and the Statesville Airport (20 minutes). The Alexander Railroad Company is an active short-line rail system operating between Taylorsville and Statesville, and connecting with Norfolk Southern.

=== State and local protected area ===
- Rocky Face Mountain Recreational Area

=== Major water bodies ===
- Catawba River
- Cub Creek
- Duck Creek
- Elk Shoals Creek
- Grassy Creek
- Lake Hickory
- Lookout Shoals Lake
- Lower Little River
- Middle Little River
- Mill Creek
- Rink Lake
- Rock Creek
- Rocky Creek
- Shuford Pond
- Snow Creek
- South Yadkin River
- Spring Creek
- Third Creek
- Wallace Creek
- White Creek

=== Adjacent counties ===
- Wilkes County – north
- Iredell County – east
- Catawba County – south
- Caldwell County – west

=== Major highways ===
- US 64
- NC 16
- NC 16 Truck (truck route)
- NC 90
- NC 127

=== Major infrastructure ===
- The county is served by one railroad, the Alexander Railroad Company

== Demographics ==
Historical population
Census	Pop.	Note	%±
1850	5,220		—
1860	6,022		15.4%
1870	6,868		14.0%
1880	8,355		21.7%
1890	9,430		12.9%
1900	10,960		16.2%
1910	11,592		5.8%
1920	12,212		5.3%
1930	12,922		5.8%
1940	13,454		4.1%
1950	14,554		8.2%
1960	15,625		7.4%
1970	19,466		24.6%
1980	24,999		28.4%
1990	27,544		10.2%
2000	33,603		22.0%
2010	37,198		10.7%
2020	36,444		−2.0%
2025 (est.)	36,958	▲	1.4%
U.S. Decennial Census; 1790–1960 1900–1990; 1990–2000 2010 2020

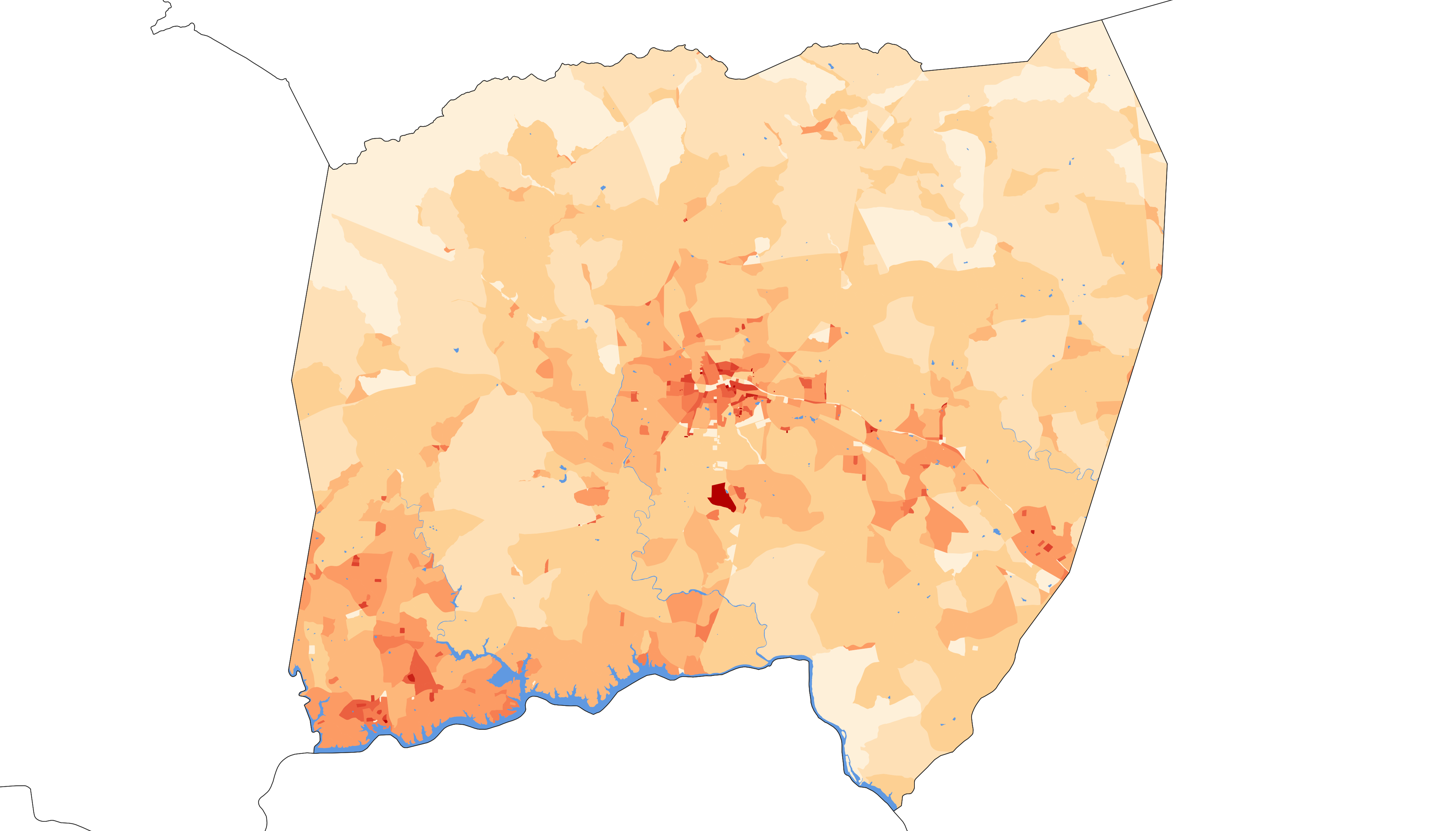
2020 population density of Alexander County NC by census block

=== Racial and ethnic composition ===
Alexander County, North Carolina – Racial and ethnic composition Note: the US Census treats Hispanic/Latino as an ethnic category. This table excludes Latinos from the racial categories and assigns them to a separate category. Hispanics/Latinos may be of any race.
Race / Ethnicity (NH = Non-Hispanic)	Pop 1980	Pop 1990	Pop 2000	Pop 2010	Pop 2020	% 1980	% 1990	% 2000	% 2010	% 2020
White alone (NH)	23,128	25,597	30,562	32,671	30,893	92.52%	92.93%	90.95%	87.83%	84.77%
Black or African American alone (NH)	1,651	1,662	1,536	2,025	1,919	6.60%	6.03%	4.57%	5.44%	5.27%
Native American or Alaska Native alone (NH)	25	52	39	84	111	0.10%	0.19%	0.12%	0.23%	0.30%
Asian alone (NH)	35	48	347	357	390	0.14%	0.17%	1.03%	0.96%	1.07%
Native Hawaiian or Pacific Islander alone (NH)	x	x	1	11	1	x	x	0.00%	0.03%	0.00%
Other race alone (NH)	0	1	26	23	83	0.00%	0.00%	0.08%	0.06%	0.23%
Mixed race or Multiracial (NH)	x	x	251	426	1,211	x	x	0.75%	1.15%	3.32%
Hispanic or Latino (any race)	160	184	841	1,601	1,836	0.64%	0.67%	2.50%	4.30%	5.04%
Total	24,999	27,544	33,603	37,198	36,444	100.00%	100.00%	100.00%	100.00%	100.00%

=== 2020 census ===
As of the 2020 census, there were 36,444 people, 14,408 households, and 10,232 families residing in the county. The median age was 44.5 years, 19.7% of residents were under the age of 18, 20.3% were 65 years of age or older, and there were 104.9 males for every 100 females (104.4 males for every 100 females age 18 and over).

The racial makeup of the county was 84.77% White (non-Hispanic), 5.27% Black or African American (non-Hispanic), 0.3% Native American, 1.07% Asian, 0.0% Pacific Islander, 3.55% other or mixed races, and 5.04% Hispanic or Latino residents of any race.

10.9% of residents lived in urban areas, while 89.1% lived in rural areas.

Of those households, 28.3% had children under the age of 18 living in them, 52.3% were married-couple households, 18.3% were households with a male householder and no spouse or partner present, 23.6% were households with a female householder and no spouse or partner present, 26.8% were made up of individuals, and 12.7% had someone living alone who was 65 years of age or older.

There were 15,960 housing units, of which 9.7% were vacant; among occupied units, 77.2% were owner-occupied and 22.8% were renter-occupied, with homeowner and rental vacancy rates of 1.1% and 5.9%, respectively.

=== 2000 census ===
At the 2000 census there were 33,603 people, 13,137 households, and 9,747 families residing in the county. The population density was 129 people per square mile (50 people/km^{2}). There were 14,098 housing units at an average density of 54 units per square mile (21 units/km^{2}). The racial makeup of the county was 92.00% White, 4.63% Black or African American, 0.15% Native American, 1.04% Asian, 1.34% from other races, and 0.84% from two or more races. 2.50% of the population were Hispanic or Latino of any race.

There were 13,137 households, out of which 32.80% had children under the age of 18 living with them, 60.50% were married couples living together, 9.40% had a female householder with no husband present, and 25.80% were non-families. 21.90% of all households were made up of individuals, and 8.40% had someone living alone who was 65 years of age or older. The average household size was 2.54 and the average family size was 2.95.

In the county, the population was spread out, with 24.50% under the age of 18, 7.90% from 18 to 24, 31.10% from 25 to 44, 24.60% from 45 to 64, and 11.90% who were 65 years of age or older. The median age was 37 years. For every 100 females there were 99.40 males. For every 100 females age 18 and over, there were 96.70 males.

The median income for a household in the county was $38,684, and the median income for a family was $45,691. Males had a median income of $29,857 versus $21,868 for females. The per capita income for the county was $18,507. About 5.90% of families and 8.50% of the population were below the poverty line, including 10.20% of those under age 18 and 14.60% of those age 65 or over.

== Government and politics ==
Alexander is currently a powerfully Republican county in Presidential elections. The only Democrat to carry the county in the past nineteen Presidential contests has been Jimmy Carter in 1976, although Barry Goldwater won the county by a mere thirty-eight votes in 1964. In contrast, Hillary Clinton in 2016 obtained barely twenty percent of the county's vote. The county did vote mainly Democratic during the Third Party System, but Populist sentiments in the 1890s have meant the county has supported the party only five times since 1896.

United States presidential election results for Alexander County, North Carolina
Year	Republican		Democratic		Third party(ies)	
Year	No.	%	No.	%	No.	%
1912	523	27.94%	852	45.51%	497	26.55%
1916	1,187	55.44%	954	44.56%	0	0.00%
1920	2,643	56.38%	2,045	43.62%	0	0.00%
1924	2,437	51.33%	2,291	48.25%	20	0.42%
1928	2,605	60.20%	1,722	39.80%	0	0.00%
1932	1,952	39.57%	2,953	59.86%	28	0.57%
1936	2,451	42.90%	3,262	57.10%	0	0.00%
1940	2,217	44.73%	2,739	55.27%	0	0.00%
1944	2,971	56.56%	2,282	43.44%	0	0.00%
1948	2,314	47.98%	2,057	42.65%	452	9.37%
1952	3,597	57.44%	2,665	42.56%	0	0.00%
1956	3,767	58.16%	2,710	41.84%	0	0.00%
1960	4,175	51.35%	3,956	48.65%	0	0.00%
1964	3,760	50.25%	3,722	49.75%	0	0.00%
1968	4,379	52.03%	1,834	21.79%	2,203	26.18%
1972	5,865	68.95%	2,468	29.01%	173	2.03%
1976	4,661	46.73%	5,287	53.00%	27	0.27%
1980	6,376	57.39%	4,546	40.92%	187	1.68%
1984	8,502	70.22%	3,581	29.58%	24	0.20%
1988	7,968	65.56%	4,148	34.13%	38	0.31%
1992	6,764	49.64%	4,849	35.59%	2,013	14.77%
1996	6,748	57.53%	3,955	33.72%	1,027	8.76%
2000	9,242	68.50%	4,166	30.88%	84	0.62%
2004	10,928	70.05%	4,618	29.60%	54	0.35%
2008	11,790	68.33%	5,167	29.95%	297	1.72%
2012	12,253	71.25%	4,611	26.81%	332	1.93%
2016	13,893	76.04%	3,767	20.62%	611	3.34%
2020	15,888	78.51%	4,145	20.48%	203	1.00%
2024	16,404	79.33%	4,060	19.64%	213	1.03%

Alexander County is a member of the regional Western Piedmont Council of Governments.

== Communities ==
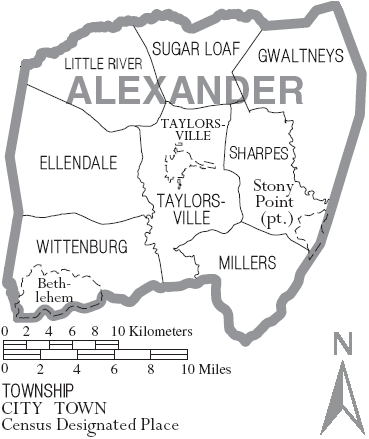
Map of Alexander County with municipal and township labels

=== Town ===
- Taylorsville (county seat, since 1847): First post master was Alexander C. McIntosh. Post office since November 26, 1847. Formerly called James Cross Roads in Iredell County prior to 1847.

=== Townships ===
By the requirements of the North Carolina Constitution of 1868, counties were divided into non-functioning county subdivisions called townships. There are eight townships in Alexander County:

- Ellendale
- Gwaltneys
- Little River
- Millers
- Sharpes
- Sugar Loaf
- Taylorsville
- Wittenburg

=== Census-designated places ===
- Bethlehem (largest community)
- Hiddenite: First postmaster was Quintis C. Patterson. Post office since February 10, 1888.
- Stony Point: First postmaster was John A. Murchison. Post office since October 21, 1847; also in Iredell County.

=== Unincorporated communities ===
Unincorporated communities in Alexander County include:

- Drumstand: Site of Drumstand community building
- Ellendale: First postmaster was William S. McLeod. Post office from July 1, 1880, to January 30, 1904.
- Little River: First postmaster was Burton Reid. Post office from November 10, 1852, to September 15, 1906. 1841 to 1847 part of Caldwell County, part of Burke County before 1841.
- Millersville
- Sugar Loaf
- Vashti: First postmaster was Humphrey T. Cambell. Post office from February 12, 1886, to March 31, 1903.
- Wittenburg: The first postmaster was Joseph B. Bradburn. Post office from May 31, 1848, to March 15, 1909. Before 1847, part of Caldwell County.

=== Population ranking ===
The population ranking of the following table is based on the 2020 census of Alexander County.

† = county seat

Rank	Name	Type	Population (2020 census)
1	Bethlehem	CDP	4,491
2	† Taylorsville	Town	2,320
3	Stony Point	CDP	1,146
4	Hiddenite	CDP	507

== Historic post offices and other sites ==
Historical post offices that were part of Alexander County include:

- Mount Pisgah: First postmaster was Reuben O. Bennett. Post office from April 9, 1849, to April 15, 1909.
- Elk Shoal: First postmaster was Ephraim M. Alexander. Post office from March 5, 1852, to November 26, 1852. Post office changed to Elk Shoal #2 on September 27, 1858, with David M. Moore as post master. Became part of Iredell County in 1868. Changed to Elk Shoal #3 in 1881 and became part of Alexander County. New postmaster was Nicholas L. Norton on August 4, 1881. Post office discontinued on January 15, 1901.
- York Collegiate Institute: First postmaster was Richard W. York. Post office from December 13, 1855, to April 2, 1859. Name was changed to Montane Female Academy on April 2, 1859, with Thaddeus L. Troy as postmaster until November 28, 1859, when the name was changed back to York Collegiate Institute with Harrison L. Smith as postmaster. Post office discontinued on December 4, 1903.
- Salem Grove: First postmaster was William W. Teague. Post office lasted from August 7 to 9, 1872.
- Jumping Run: First postmaster was James F. Gryder. Post office from August 15, 1871, to October 15, 1872.
- Cedar Run: First postmaster was John H. Ellis. Post office from February 9, 1876, to September 14, 1903.
- Little River: First postmaster was Burton Reid. Post office from November 10, 1952, to September 15, 1906. Formerly in Burke County before 1841 and Caldwell County in 1841.
- Mount Bethel: First postmaster was Adam P. Bohick. Post office from May 8, 1876, to March 15, 1913.
- Barnetts Mountain: First postmaster was David L. Mitchell. Post office from December 29, 1876, to April 13, 1881.
- Kilby: First postmaster was Leander R. Goforth. Post office from May 3, 1880, to May 15, 1905.
- Pilgrim: First postmaster was William E. Millsope. Post office from June 30, 1880, to October 15, 1882.
- Bentley: First postmaster was William W. Teague. Post office from January 24, 1881, to September 30, 1941.
- Hedrick: First postmaster was Edward L. Hedrick. Post office from October 7, 1881, to September 30, 1903.
- Broad Shoals: First postmaster was Thomas Little. Post office from October 31, 1881, to November 15, 1904.
- Grade: First postmaster was John P. Brewer. Post office from June 11, 1882, to May 15, 1900. Originally Iredell County and became Alexander County in 1888.

=== Other historic sites ===
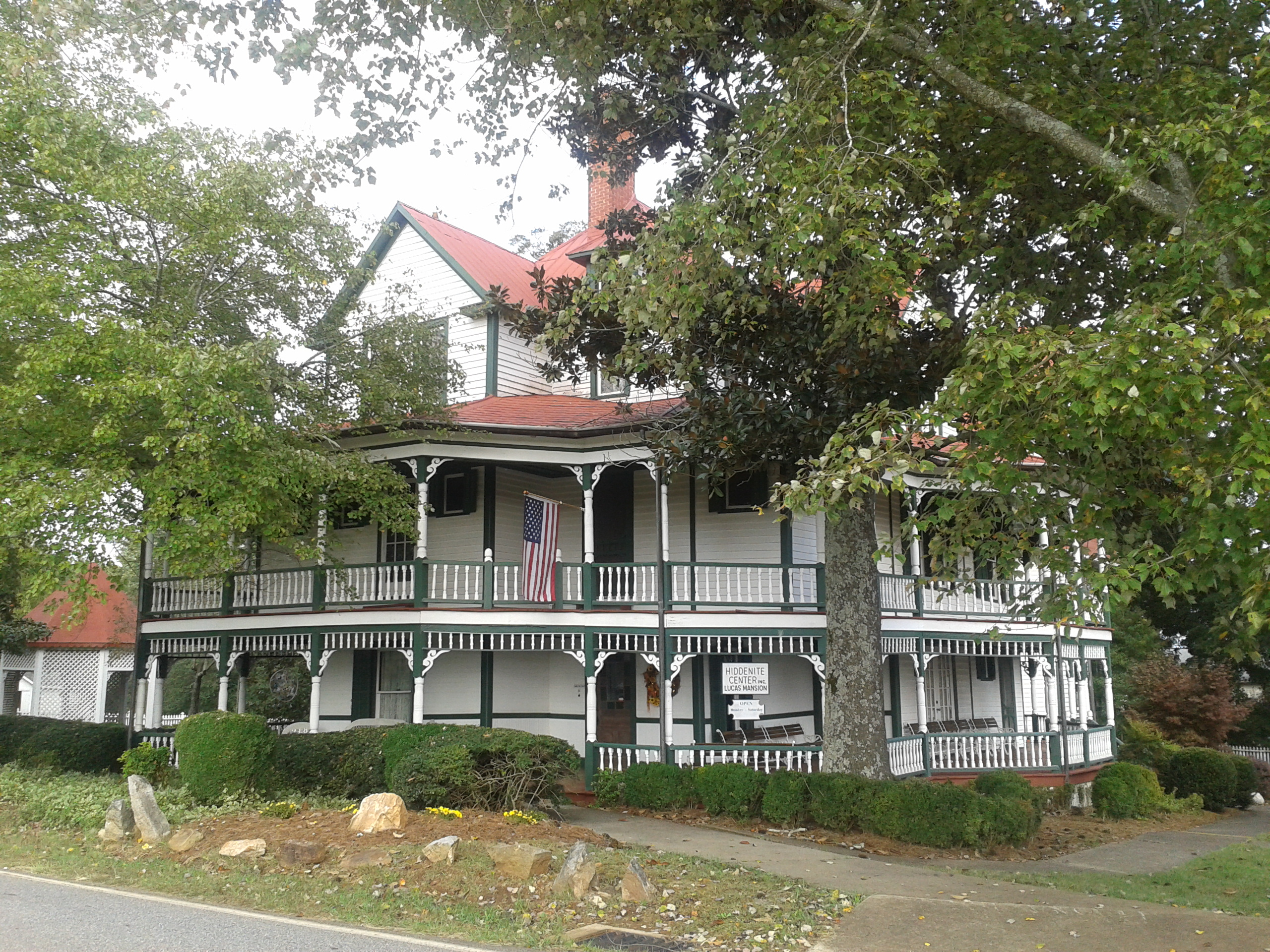
Lucas Mansion in Hiddenite

- Old Jail Museum: 1919 jail in Taylorsville, now a museum
- Lucas Mansion: Restored turn of the century home of James "Diamond Jim" Lucas in Hiddenite Center
- Friendship Church: Lutheran and Evangelical church organized in 1833, near Taylorsville
- Linney's Mill: Built in 1790 by Richard Cook. Located on the northeast corner of Alexander County, it is still operational.
- Little River Baptist Church: first association meeting in 1771 (in what became Alexander County in 1847), church erected in 1786, originally called "Old Meeting House"

== See also ==
- List of counties in North Carolina
- National Register of Historic Places listings in Alexander County, North Carolina
- List of Highway Historical Markers in Alexander County, North Carolina
- Category:People from Alexander County, North Carolina
