= Taylorsville, North Carolina =

- Town
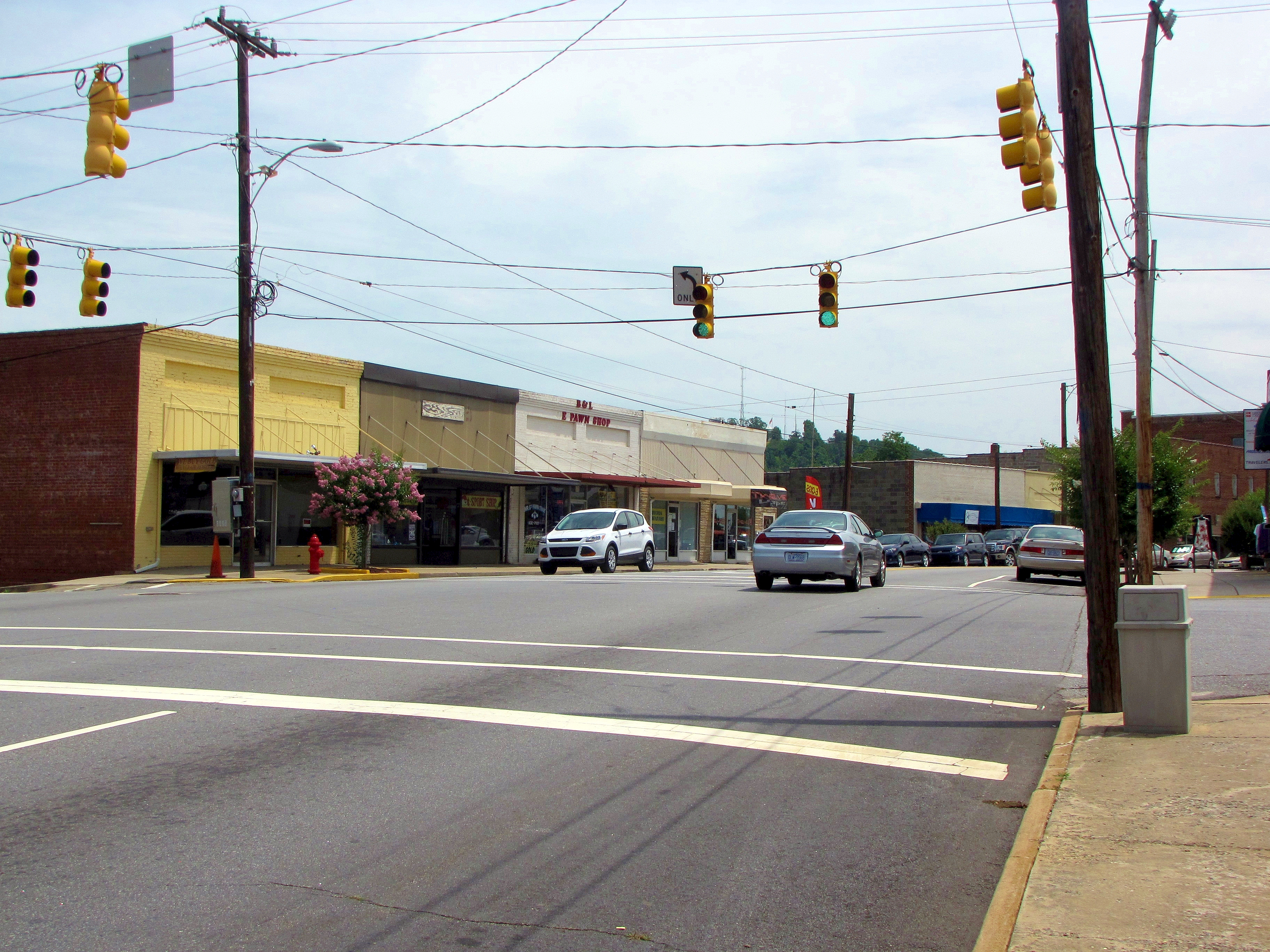
- Main Street in Taylorsville

- Seal

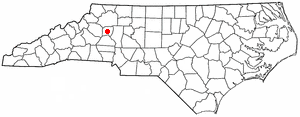
- Location in North Carolina
- Coordinates: 35°55′03″N 81°10′32″W
- Country: United States
- State: North Carolina
- County: Alexander
- Incorporated: 1879
- Named for: Zachary Taylor

Government
  - Mayor: George Holleman

Area
  - Total: 2.40 sq mi (6.21 km^{2})
  - Land: 2.39 sq mi (6.20 km^{2})
  - Water: 0.0039 sq mi (0.01 km^{2})
- Elevation: 1,175 ft (358 m)

Population (2020)
  - Total: 2,320
  - Density: 968.5/sq mi (373.94/km^{2})
- Time zone: UTC-5 (Eastern (EST))
  - Summer (DST): UTC-4 (EDT)
- ZIP code: 28681
- Area code: 828
- FIPS code: 37-66960
- GNIS feature ID: 2406720
- Website: www.taylorsvillenc.com

Taylorsville is a town in Alexander County, North Carolina, United States. The population was 2,320 at the 2020 census. It is the county seat of Alexander County.

Taylorsville is part of the Hickory–Lenoir–Morganton Metropolitan Statistical Area.

== History ==
The town of Taylorsville was formed in 1847 along with Alexander County. A commission of William Dula of Caldwell County, Dr. James Calloway of Wilkes County, Milton Campbell of Iredell County, and Robert Allen, Reuben Watts and Robert L. Steel of Alexander County were named to select a site as near the center of the county as possible for the seat of justice. The town was named Taylorsville in honor of General Zachary Taylor who at that time was in Mexico engaged in the Mexican–American War.

The land for the town was donated by J.M. Bogle who gave 22 acres (89,000 m^{2}), William Matheson who gave 13 acres (53,000 m^{2}) and James James who gave 11 3/4 acres for a total of 46 3/4 acres. Most of the land was woodland, and the road from Statesville to Morganton passed to the south of town.

A commission of Alexander C. McIntosh, R.L. Steel, Sion Harrington, J.H. Newland, and George Swaim, treasurer, were appointed to lay out the town of Taylorsville and sell lots to raise money for the building of a courthouse and jail. An auction of lots was held August 11, 1847, and 47 lots were sold. The second sale was November 30, 1847, and 10 lots were sold. At a third auction on March 8, 1848, five lots were sold. The total amounted to $6,674.75 (equivalent to $248,378 in 2025).

The town of Taylorsville was incorporated in 1879. The first mayor was John Watts and was appointed by the commissioners. The boundaries of the incorporated town were square, with each side 160 poles or one-half mile long.

== Geography ==
According to the United States Census Bureau, the town has a total area of 2.4 square miles (6.1 km^{2}), of which 0.0039 square miles (0.01 km^{2}), or 0.17%, is water.

=== Climate ===
Climate data for Taylorsville, North Carolina (1991–2020 normals, extremes 1994–present)
Month	Jan	Feb	Mar	Apr	May	Jun	Jul	Aug	Sep	Oct	Nov	Dec	Year
Record high °F (°C)	78 (26)	82 (28)	87 (31)	90 (32)	98 (37)	102 (39)	100 (38)	102 (39)	96 (36)	94 (34)	82 (28)	77 (25)	102 (39)
Mean daily maximum °F (°C)	48.7 (9.3)	52.7 (11.5)	60.1 (15.6)	69.5 (20.8)	77.0 (25.0)	84.2 (29.0)	87.2 (30.7)	85.5 (29.7)	79.7 (26.5)	70.1 (21.2)	60.0 (15.6)	51.4 (10.8)	68.8 (20.5)
Daily mean °F (°C)	39.0 (3.9)	42.2 (5.7)	49.3 (9.6)	57.9 (14.4)	65.7 (18.7)	73.4 (23.0)	76.7 (24.8)	75.5 (24.2)	69.6 (20.9)	59.1 (15.1)	49.1 (9.5)	41.6 (5.3)	58.3 (14.6)
Mean daily minimum °F (°C)	29.2 (−1.6)	31.6 (−0.2)	38.6 (3.7)	46.4 (8.0)	54.4 (12.4)	62.6 (17.0)	66.2 (19.0)	65.5 (18.6)	59.4 (15.2)	48.1 (8.9)	38.3 (3.5)	31.8 (−0.1)	47.7 (8.7)
Record low °F (°C)	4 (−16)	4 (−16)	11 (−12)	27 (−3)	35 (2)	44 (7)	53 (12)	52 (11)	41 (5)	29 (−2)	15 (−9)	3 (−16)	3 (−16)
Average precipitation inches (mm)	4.36 (111)	3.57 (91)	4.26 (108)	4.73 (120)	4.56 (116)	5.07 (129)	4.33 (110)	5.42 (138)	4.47 (114)	3.77 (96)	3.75 (95)	4.27 (108)	52.56 (1,336)
Average snowfall inches (cm)	1.7 (4.3)	0.4 (1.0)	0.2 (0.51)	0.0 (0.0)	0.0 (0.0)	0.0 (0.0)	0.0 (0.0)	0.0 (0.0)	0.0 (0.0)	0.0 (0.0)	0.0 (0.0)	1.5 (3.8)	3.8 (9.61)
Average precipitation days (≥ 0.01 in)	7.6	8.1	8.7	8.0	8.4	10.4	11.1	9.6	7.9	6.7	6.7	7.9	101.1
Average snowy days (≥ 0.1 in)	0.7	0.5	0.4	0.0	0.0	0.0	0.0	0.0	0.0	0.0	0.0	0.4	2.0
Source 1: NOAA
Source 2: National Weather Service

== Demographics ==
Historical population
Census	Pop.	Note	%±
1870	169		—
1880	180		6.5%
1900	413		—
1910	662		60.3%
1920	1,122		69.5%
1930	926		−17.5%
1940	1,122		21.2%
1950	1,310		16.8%
1960	1,470		12.2%
1970	1,231		−16.3%
1980	1,103		−10.4%
1990	1,566		42.0%
2000	1,799		14.9%
2010	2,098		16.6%
2020	2,320		10.6%
U.S. Decennial Census

=== 2020 census ===
As of the 2020 census, Taylorsville had a population of 2,320. The median age was 42.6 years. 21.8% of residents were under the age of 18 and 24.4% of residents were 65 years of age or older. For every 100 females there were 77.8 males, and for every 100 females age 18 and over there were 70.5 males age 18 and over.

0.0% of residents lived in urban areas, while 100.0% lived in rural areas.

There were 1,005 households in Taylorsville, of which 29.7% had children under the age of 18 living in them. Of all households, 31.4% were married-couple households, 20.0% were households with a male householder and no spouse or partner present, and 43.1% were households with a female householder and no spouse or partner present. About 39.4% of all households were made up of individuals and 20.6% had someone living alone who was 65 years of age or older. There were 573 families residing in the town.

There were 1,110 housing units, of which 9.5% were vacant. The homeowner vacancy rate was 0.9% and the rental vacancy rate was 6.0%.

Taylorsville racial composition
Race	Number	Percentage
White (non-Hispanic)	1,776	76.55%
Black or African American (non-Hispanic)	238	10.26%
Native American	4	0.17%
Asian	17	0.73%
Other/Mixed	110	4.74%
Hispanic or Latino	175	7.54%

=== 2000 census ===
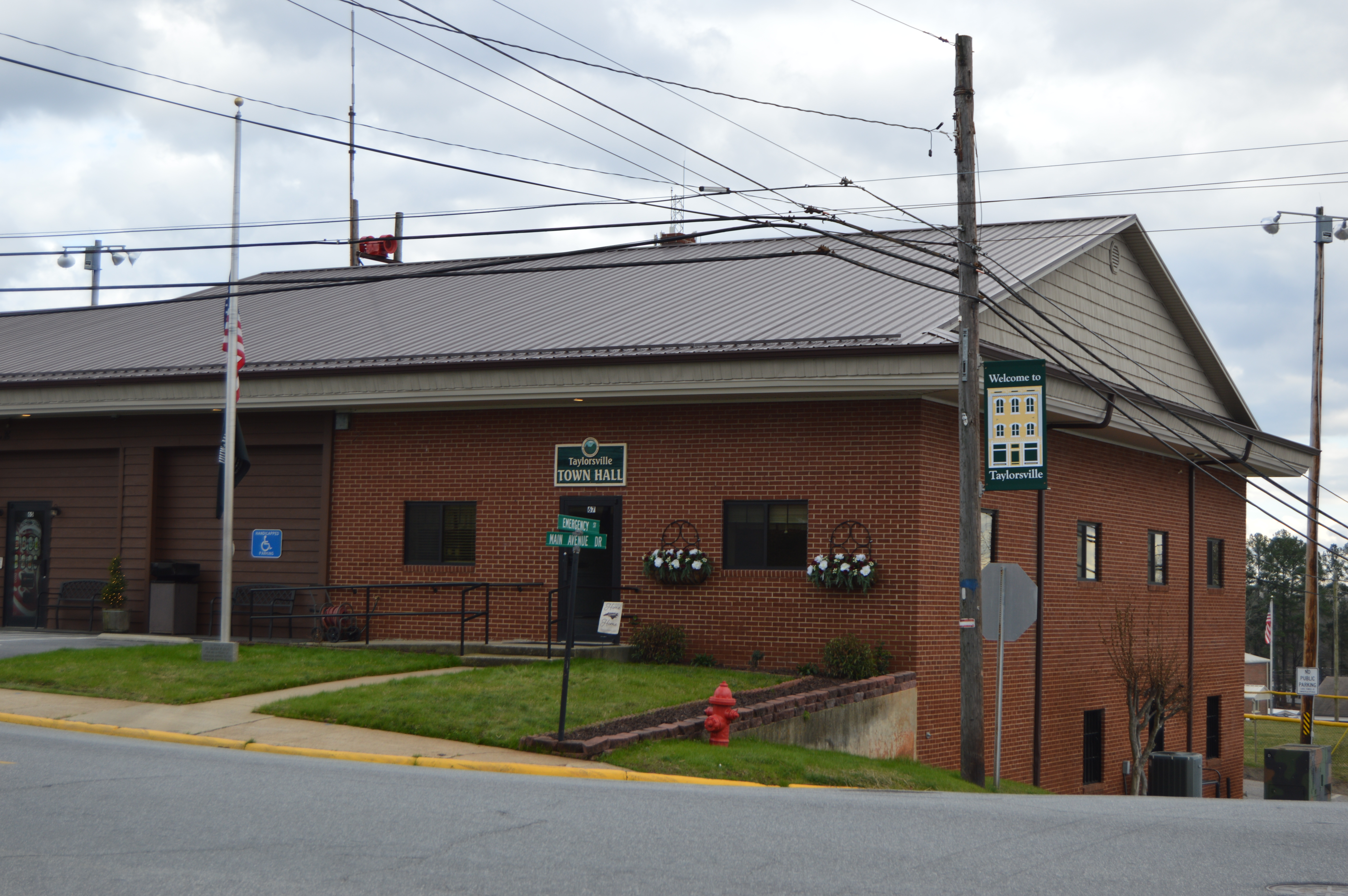
Taylorsville Town Hall

As of the census of 2000, there were 1,798 people, 746 households, and 446 families residing in the town. The population density was 897.6 inhabitants per square mile (346.6/km^{2}). There were 819 housing units at an average density of 408.6 per square mile (157.8/km^{2}). The racial makeup of the town was 82.71% White, 11.40% African American, 0.11% Native American, 1.06% Asian, 3.50% from other races, and 1.22% from two or more races. Hispanic or Latino of any race were 6.17% of the population.

There were 746 households, out of which 25.1% had children under the age of 18 living with them, 39.9% were married couples living together, 14.9% had a female householder with no husband present, and 40.1% were non-families. 35.8% of all households were made up of individuals, and 17.7% had someone living alone who was 65 years of age or older. The average household size was 2.20 and the average family size was 2.83.

In the town, the population was spread out, with 20.6% under the age of 18, 7.9% from 18 to 24, 25.8% from 25 to 44, 20.3% from 45 to 64, and 25.3% who were 65 years of age or older. The median age was 41 years. For every 100 females, there were 84.9 males. For every 100 females age 18 and over, there were 77.5 males.

The median income for a household in the town was $24,875, and the median income for a family was $34,063. Males had a median income of $29,737 versus $20,135 for females. The per capita income for the town was $14,876. About 12.7% of families and 21.3% of the population were below the poverty line, including 26.8% of those under age 18 and 21.2% of those age 65 or over.

== Education ==
The students of Taylorsville are served by the Alexander County Schools district. There are two high schools in the district, Alexander Central High School and Alexander Early College, both of which are located in the town. However, 9% of students at Challenger Early College High School (a public high school in Hickory, North Carolina operated by Catawba County Schools) reside in Alexander County.

== Notable people ==
- Charles E. Allen, former Undersecretary for Intelligence and Analysis at the US Department of Homeland Security
- Henlee Hulix Barnette, American social activist and professor of Christian ethics
- Zach Brzykcy, MLB pitcher
- Harry Deal and the Galaxies, longtime "beach music" band
- Harry Gant, former NASCAR Cup Series driver, member of the NASCAR Hall of Fame
- Wesley Harris, member of the North Carolina House of Representatives
- Romulus Z. Linney, U.S. congressman from 1895 to 1901
- Jim Poole, MLB first baseman
- Jerry Rushing, bootlegger and inspiration for The Dukes of Hazzard
- Guppy Troup, former professional ten-pin bowler, member of the PBA Hall of Fame
- Kyle Troup, professional ten-pin bowler
- Onur Tukel, filmmaker
- William Vanderbloemen, entrepreneur, pastor, speaker, and author
- Rex White, former NASCAR Grand National Division (now Cup Series) champion, member of the NASCAR Hall of Fame

== See also ==
- Taylorsville Times
