= National Register of Historic Places listings in Johnston County, North Carolina =

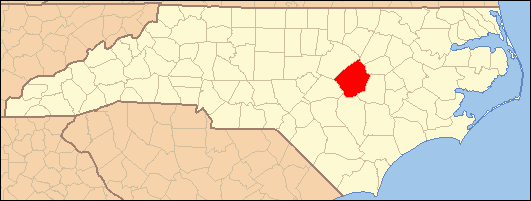

This list includes properties and districts listed on the National Register of Historic Places in Johnston County, North Carolina. Click the "Map of all coordinates" link to the right to view an online map of all properties and districts with latitude and longitude coordinates in the table below.

== Current listings ==
This National Park Service list is complete through NPS recent listings posted May 1, 2026.

	Name on the Register	Image	Date listed	Location	City or town	Description
1	Atkinson-Smith House		June 5, 1975 (#75001276)	10 miles (16 km) east of Smithfield off SR 1007; 35°42′50″N 78°14′17″W	Smithfield	
2	Benson Historic District		May 9, 1985 (#85001053)	Roughly bounded by E. Hill, N. Lee, E. Parish and Farmers Dr. on Main and Church Sts. 35°22′54″N 78°32′51″W	Benson	
3	Bentonville Battleground State Historic Site	Bentonville Battleground State Historic Site	February 26, 1970 (#70000460)	South of Princeton, off U.S. 701 and SR 1008; 35°18′23″N 78°19′26″W	Princeton	
4	Boyette Slave House	Boyette Slave House	September 20, 1979 (#79003329)	Northwest of Kenly on SR 2110; 35°39′09″N 78°10′52″W	Kenly	
5	Brooklyn Historic District	Brooklyn Historic District	May 5, 2000 (#00000443)	Roughly bounded by Spring Branch Creek, S. Fifth St., S. Third St., and Lee St. 35°30′22″N 78°20′52″W	Smithfield	
6	Clayton Banking Company Building	Clayton Banking Company Building	December 6, 1996 (#96001444)	301 E. Main St. 35°38′59″N 78°27′29″W	Clayton	
7	Clayton Graded School and Clayton Grammar School-Municipal Auditorium	Clayton Graded School and Clayton Grammar School-Municipal Auditorium	October 20, 2001 (#01001133)	101 and 111 2nd St. 35°39′08″N 78°27′38″W	Clayton	
8	Clayton Historic District	Clayton Historic District	June 7, 2010 (#10000314)	Bounded by Mulberry St., W Barnes St., Mill St., S Lombard St., Blanche St. 35°39′03″N 78°27′23″W	Clayton	
9	Cleveland School		September 7, 2005 (#05000961)	8968 Cleveland Rd. 35°34′06″N 78°31′43″W	Clayton	
10	Downtown Selma Historic District		August 30, 2010 (#10000601)	Includes portions of both sides of N. and S. Raiford, E. & W. Anderson, E. and W. Waddell, and E. and W. Railroad Sts, and W Web; 35°32′12″N 78°17′04″W	Selma	
11	Downtown Smithfield Historic District	Downtown Smithfield Historic District	October 14, 1993 (#93001120)	S. Third and Market Sts. 35°30′39″N 78°20′46″W	Smithfield	
12	Noah Edward Edgerton House	Noah Edward Edgerton House	June 24, 1982 (#82003477)	301 W. Railroad St. 35°32′10″N 78°17′49″W	Selma	
13	Ellington-Ellis Farm		July 21, 1983 (#83001892)	SR 1004; 35°40′18″N 78°28′46″W	Clayton	
14	Former US Post Office	Former US Post Office	April 22, 1993 (#93000315)	405 E. Market St. 35°30′38″N 78°20′39″W	Smithfield	
15	Four Oaks Commercial Historic District	Four Oaks Commercial Historic District	August 9, 2006 (#06000692)	100-300 blocks N. Main, 100-200 blocks S. Main, 100 block S.W. Railroad, 100 block W Wellons St. & 100 block W. Woodall St. 35°26′46″N 78°25′46″W	Four Oaks	
16	Hannah's Creek Primitive Baptist Church		January 25, 1991 (#90002181)	NC 301 southwest of junction with NC 1171; 35°24′36″N 78°30′20″W	Benson	
17	Harper House	Harper House	February 26, 1970 (#70000459)	Near junction of SR 1008 and 1188; 35°18′05″N 78°19′57″W	Harper	
18	Richard B. Harrison School		December 26, 2012 (#12001089)	605 W. Noble & 405 S. Brevard Sts. 35°32′11″N 78°17′31″W	Selma	
19	Hastings-McKinnie House	Hastings-McKinnie House	September 8, 1983 (#83001893)	201 S. Pierce St. 35°27′43″N 78°09′24″W	Princeton	
20	Hood Brothers Building	Hood Brothers Building	August 14, 1986 (#86001623)	100-104 S. Third St. 35°30′40″N 78°20′47″W	Smithfield	
21	Hood-Strickland House	Hood-Strickland House	August 23, 1990 (#90001310)	415 S. 4th St. 35°30′22″N 78°20′50″W	Smithfield	
22	Johnston County Courthouse	Johnston County Courthouse	May 10, 1979 (#79001728)	207 E. Johnston St. 35°30′41″N 78°20′50″W	Smithfield	
23	Walter R. and Eliza Smith Moore House		May 4, 2005 (#05000379)	3919 Raleigh Rd. 35°33′07″N 78°31′43″W	Clayton	
24	North Smithfield Historic District		May 26, 2000 (#00000550)	Roughly bounded by Market, Front, North, and Seventh Sts. 35°30′49″N 78°20′38″W	Smithfield	
25	Nowell-Mayerburg-Oliver House	Nowell-Mayerburg-Oliver House	June 24, 1982 (#82003478)	312 W. Anderson St. 35°32′14″N 78°17′11″W	Selma	
26	Princeton Graded School	Princeton Graded School	October 4, 2005 (#05001139)	601-611 W. Edwards St. 35°28′11″N 78°10′07″W	Princeton	
27	Sanders-Hairr House		May 6, 1971 (#71000597)	South of Clayton on SR 1525; 35°36′46″N 78°32′05″W	Clayton	
28	Shiloh Primitive Baptist Church		January 31, 2008 (#07001498)	9495 Brogden Rd. 35°24′21″N 78°12′41″W	Brogden	
29	William E. Smith House	William E. Smith House	June 24, 1982 (#82003480)	309 W. Railroad St. 35°32′08″N 78°17′13″W	Selma	
30	Smithfield Masonic Lodge	Smithfield Masonic Lodge	September 28, 2007 (#07001012)	115 N. Second St. 35°30′45″N 78°20′51″W	Smithfield	
31	Stallings-Carpenter House		March 28, 1983 (#83001894)	SR 1713; 35°41′26″N 78°27′27″W	Clayton	
32	Everitt P. Stevens House		June 24, 1982 (#82003481)	SR 1003; 35°33′33″N 78°17′49″W	Selma	
33	Union Station	Union Station	June 24, 1982 (#82003482)	E. Railroad St. 35°31′57″N 78°16′50″W	Selma	
34	Watson-Sanders House		January 26, 2001 (#01000015)	2810 Brogden Rd. 35°28′07″N 78°19′34″W	Smithfield	
35	West Selma Historic District	West Selma Historic District	December 30, 2011 (#11000975)	Bounded by W. Railroad, N. Brevard, W. Richardson, and N. Pollock Sts. 35°32′20″N 78°17′09″W	Selma	
36	Wood-Rains Cotton Gin		December 21, 2023 (#100009629)	206 W. Railroad Avenue; 35°28′00″N 78°09′39″W	Princeton	

== See also ==
- National Register of Historic Places listings in North Carolina
- List of National Historic Landmarks in North Carolina
