= Selma Historic District =

Selma Historic District may refer to

== Alabama ==
- Riverview Historic District (Selma, Alabama)
- Old Town Historic District (Selma, Alabama)

== North Carolina ==
- Downtown Selma Historic District
- West Selma Historic District
