= Smithfield Historic District =

Smithfield Historic District may refer to:

- Smithfield Historic District (Birmingham, Alabama), listed on the National Register of Historic Places listings in Jefferson County, Alabama
- Smithfield Historic District (Smithfield, Virginia), listed on the National Register of Historic Places listings in Isle of Wight County, Virginia
- Downtown Smithfield Historic District, Smithfield, North Carolina, listed on the National Register of Historic Places listings in Johnston County, North Carolina
- North Smithfield Historic District, Smithfield, North Carolina, listed on the National Register of Historic Places listings in Johnston County, North Carolina

== See also ==
- Smithfield Farm, Berryville, Virginia, a historic district listed on the NRHP in Virginia
- Smithfield Road Historic District, North Smithfield, Rhode Island
- Smithfield (Blacksburg, Virginia), listed on the NRHP in Virginia
- Smithfield (Rosedale, Virginia), a historic district listed on the NRHP in Virginia
