= Sanders =

Sanders may refer to:

== People ==
- Sanders (surname)
- Sanders Anne Laubenthal (1943–2002), American writer
- Sanders Shiver (born 1955), former US National Football League player
- Sanders, a variation of Sawney, an obsolete nickname for a Scot

== Companies ==
- Sanders Associates, part of BAE Systems
- Sanders Aviation
- Sanders Coaches, a bus operator in England
- Sanders Confectionery, Detroit, United States
- Sanders & Sanders Ltd., English shoemaker

== Places in the United States ==
- Sanders, Arizona, an unincorporated community
- Sanders, Indiana, an unincorporated community
- Sanders, Kentucky, a city
- Sanders Township, Pennington County, Minnesota
- Sanders, Montana, an unincorporated community
- Sanders County, Montana
- Sanders Creek (Iowa)
- Sanders Creek (Red River tributary), Texas
- Fort Sanders (Wyoming), constructed in 1866 near Laramie

== Other uses ==
- Sanders of Oxford, an antique print shop in England
- Sanders Theater, a lecture and concert hall at Harvard University
- USS Sanders, two US Navy ships
- 3029 Sanders, an asteroid
- Sanders, a name for Shepherd's pie
- sanders, codename for the Motorola Moto G5s Plus

== See also ==
- Sanders portrait of William Shakespeare, painted 1603
- Sanders House (disambiguation), various American buildings
- Sander (disambiguation)
- Sandars (disambiguation)
