= Clayton Historic District =

Clayton Historic District can refer to:

- Clayton Historic District (Clayton, New York), listed on the National Register of Historic Places (NRHP) in Jefferson County, New York
- Clayton Historic District (Clayton, North Carolina), listed on the NRHP in Johnston County, North Carolina
