= Sanders Creek =

Sanders Creek may refer to:

- Sanders Creek (Iowa), a stream in Iowa
- Sanders Creek (Red River tributary), a stream in Texas
