= Middlehurst =

Middlehurst is a surname. Notable people with the surname include:

- Andy Middlehurst (born 1963), British racing driver
- Barbara M. Middlehurst (1915–1995), Welsh astronomer
- Gary Middlehurst (born 1983), English rugby league player
- Tom Middlehurst (born 1936), Welsh politician
