= Sanders House =

Sanders House may refer to:

- Sanders House (Little Rock, Arkansas), listed on the NRHP in Arkansas
- Sanders-Hollabaugh House, Marshall, AR, listed on the NRHP in Arkansas
- Durham Sanders House, Campbellsville, KY, listed on the NRHP in Kentucky
- Robert Sanders House, Georgetown, KY, listed on the NRHP in Kentucky
- Jared Young Sanders, Jr., House, Baton Rouge, LA, listed on the NRHP in Louisiana
- G. O. Sanders House, Hudson, NH, listed on the NRHP in New Hampshire
- James Sanders House, Little Falls, NY, listed on the NRHP in New York
- Sanders-Hairr House, Clayton, NC, listed on the NRHP in North Carolina
- Watson-Sanders House, Smithfield, NC, listed on the NRHP in North Carolina
- Sanders House (Beaumont, Texas), listed on the NRHP in Texas
- William Edward Sanders House, Burton, TX, listed on the NRHP in Texas
- Walter McDonald Sanders House, Bluefield, VA, listed on the NRHP in Virginia
- Sanders Farm, Max Meadows, VA, listed on the NRHP in Virginia
- Erick Gustave Sanders Mansion, Kent, WA, listed on the NRHP in Washington
