= Sandars =

Sandars is a surname which may refer to:

- Clare Sandars (born 1934), English former child actress
- John Satterfield Sandars (1853-1934), British politician, known as "Jack" Sandars.
- Joseph Sandars (1785-1860), English corn merchant and railway pioneer
- Nancy Sandars (1914–2015), British archaeologist and prehistorian
- Samuel Sandars (1837–1894), English bibliographer, barrister and university benefactor
- Thomas Collett Sandars (1825–1894), English barrister
- Tom Sandars (born 1976), British radio news reader and continuity announcer

== See also ==
- Sanders (disambiguation)
