= Hastings-McKinnie House =

Historic house in North Carolina, United States

- U.S. National Register of Historic Places
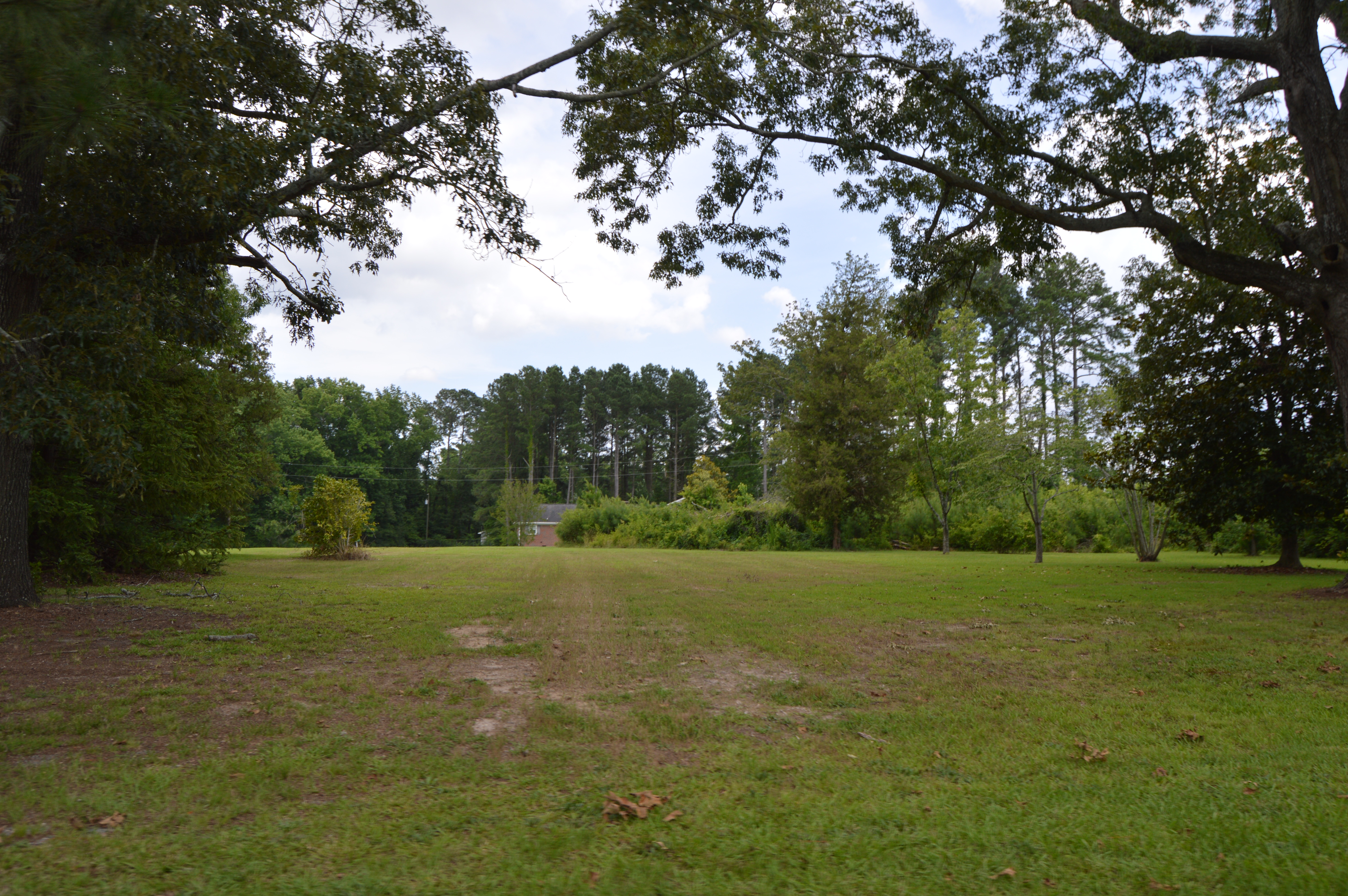
- Site of the house

- Location within North Carolina Location within the United States
- Location: 201 S. Pierce St., Princeton, North Carolina
- Coordinates: 35°27′43″N 78°9′24″W
- Area: 1.2 acres (0.49 ha)
- Built: c. 1845
- Architectural style: Federal
- NRHP reference No.: 83001893
- Added to NRHP: September 8, 1983

Hastings-McKinnie House was a historic home located at Princeton, Johnston County, North Carolina. It was built about 1845, and was a 1 1/2-story, five bay by two bay, Federal style frame dwelling. It had a gable roof and flanking exterior end chimneys replaced in 1945, when the house was moved to its present location.

It was listed on the National Register of Historic Places in 1983.

The home and several acres were sold to a Johnston County residential developer in December 2016. The home and any associated outbuildings were demolished and the property is completely vacant as of August 2021.
