= Clayton, North Carolina =

- Town
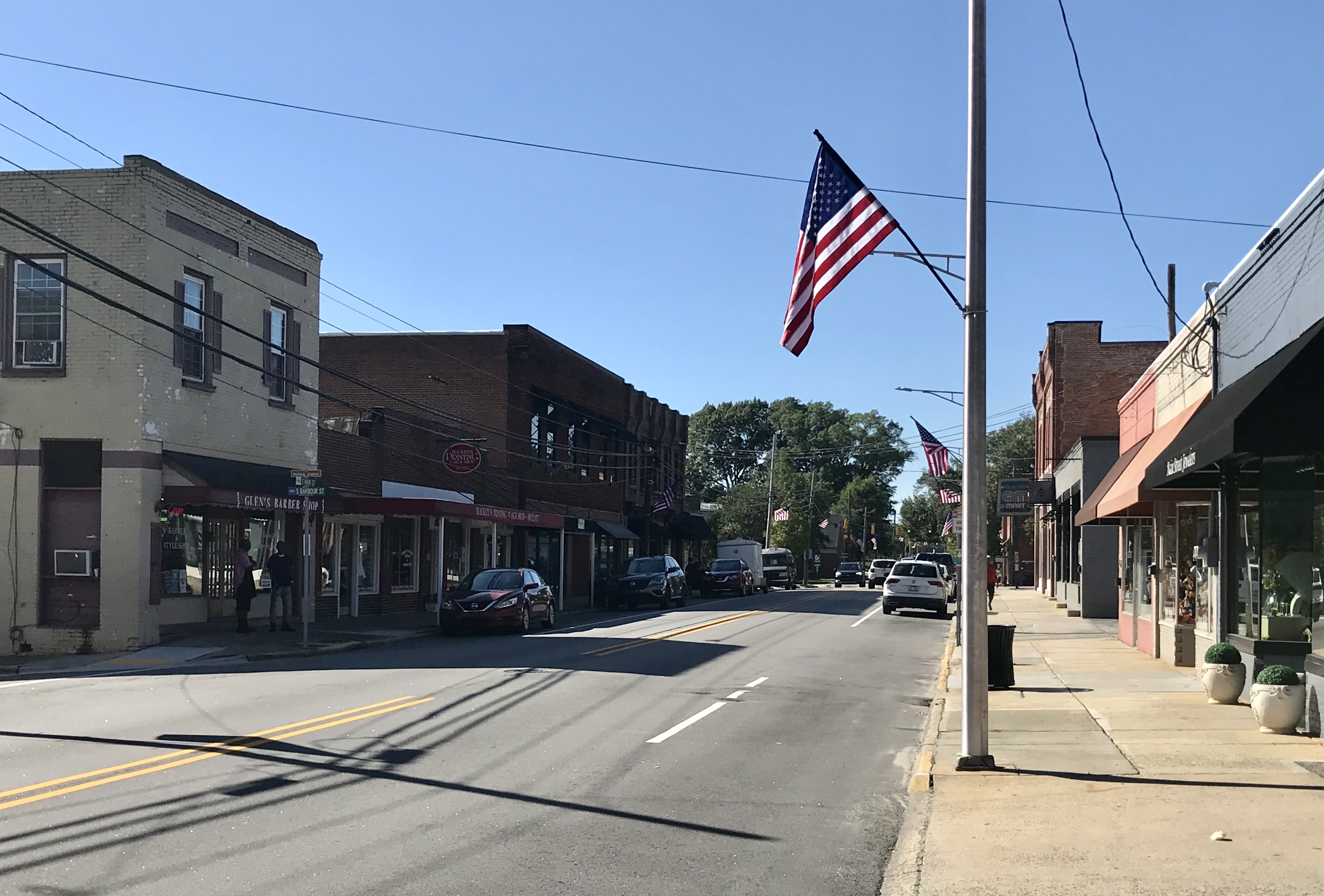
- East Main Street in Clayton

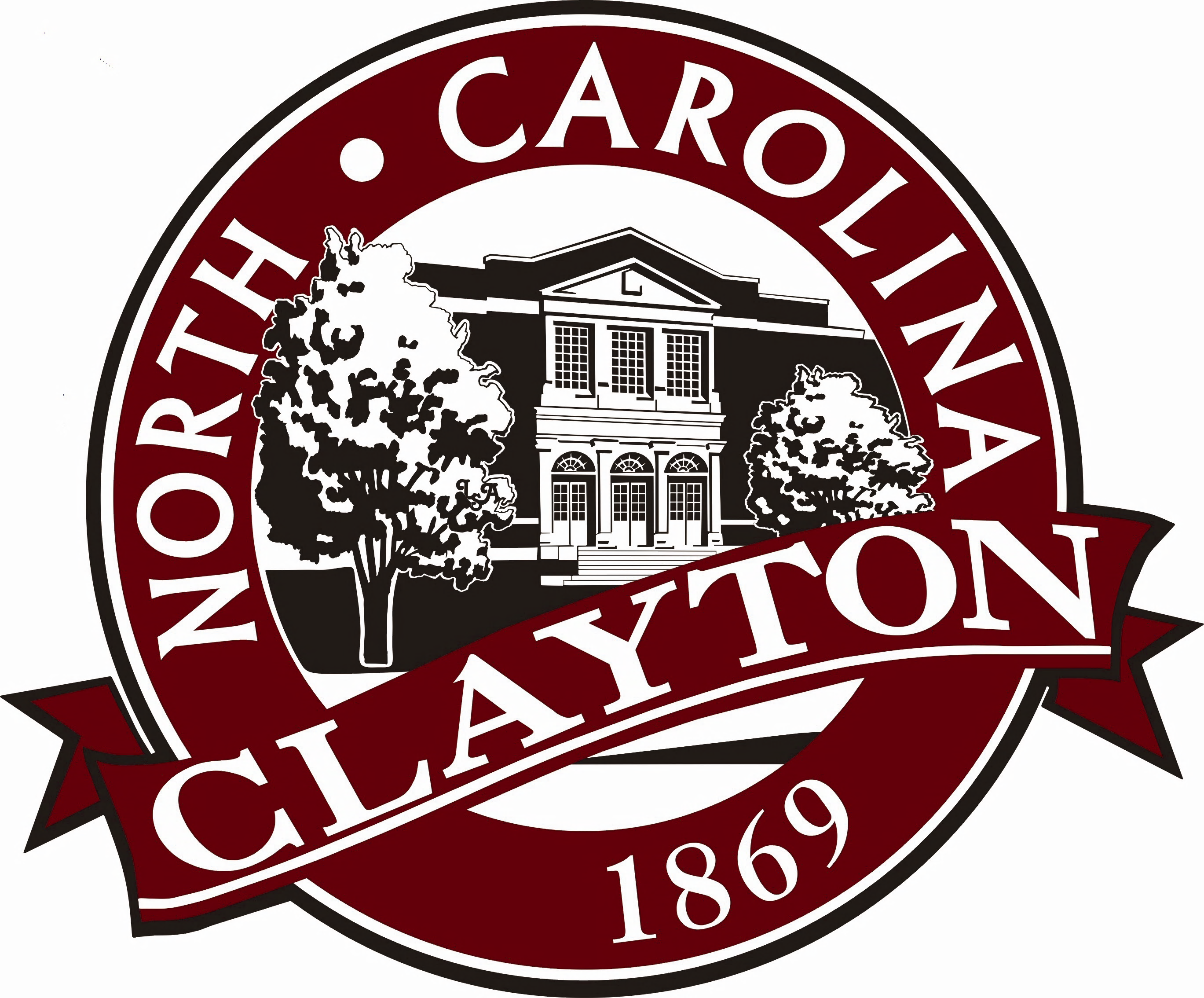
- Seal
- Motto: "The Premier Community for Active Families"
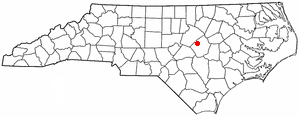
- Location of Clayton, North Carolina

- Location within North Carolina Location within the United States
- Coordinates: 35°39′30″N 78°26′55″W
- Country: United States
- State: North Carolina
- Counties: Johnston, Wake
- Established: 1869

Government
  - Mayor: Jody McLeod

Area
  - Total: 17.12 sq mi (44.34 km^{2})
  - Land: 17.10 sq mi (44.28 km^{2})
  - Water: 0.023 sq mi (0.06 km^{2})
- Elevation: 276 ft (84 m)

Population (2020)
  - Total: 26,307
  - Estimate (2023): 30,151
  - Density: 1,800/sq mi (680/km^{2})
- Time zone: UTC−5 (Eastern (EST))
  - Summer (DST): UTC−4 (EDT)
- ZIP codes: 27520, 27527
- Area codes: 919, 984
- FIPS code: 37-12860
- GNIS feature ID: 2406276
- Website: www.townofclaytonnc.org

Clayton is a town in Johnston County, North Carolina, United States, and is considered a suburb of Raleigh. As of 2020, Clayton's population was 26,307, up from 16,116 at the 2010 census. By 2024, the town's estimated population was 30,621. Much of that growth can be attributed to the town's proximity to the Research Triangle area and access to major highways such as I-40 and US 70.

== History ==
In 1701, English surveyor John Lawson, who was traveling down the Neuse River from Charleston, South Carolina, first visited the Clayton area, on his way to the Piedmont and eastern North Carolina. Four years later, the region was incorporated into Craven County, which then stretched west of New Bern to the Pacific Ocean. In the early eighteenth century, the area had been largely inhabited by the Tuscarora tribe, who in 1711 were defeated by European settlers and their Native American allies and forced to leave the area, then part of the Province of Carolina.

== Geography ==
Clayton is in western Johnston County, with small portions extending into Wake County. In 2006, construction began on the Highway 70 Clayton Bypass, a 10.5-mile (16.9 km) stretch from Interstate 40 along the southern portion of Clayton to Highway 70 business southeast of town. It was completed in June 2008. US 70 leads southeast 13 miles (21 km) to Interstate 95 at Smithfield. Downtown Raleigh is 16 miles (26 km) northwest of Clayton via US 70 Business and Interstate 40. Many local unincorporated communities outside of the town limits use Clayton mailing addresses, including Cleveland, Powhatan, and Flowers.

According to the U.S. Census Bureau, as of the 2010 census the town had an area of 13.53 square miles (35.05 km^{2}), of which 13.51 square miles (34.99 km^{2}) were land and 0.02 square miles (0.06 km^{2}), or 0.16%, were water. The town is part of the Neuse River watershed. The town limits now extend northeast to the Neuse River and beyond.

Town Hall is located at 111 East Second Street and is shared with The Clayton Center, a performing arts and conference center.

=== Climate ===
According to the Köppen Climate Classification system, Clayton has a humid subtropical climate, abbreviated "Cfa" on climate maps. The hottest temperature recorded in Clayton was 107 °F (41.7 °C) on August 18, 1988, while the coldest temperature recorded was −10 °F (−23.3 °C) on January 21, 1985.

Climate data for Clayton, North Carolina, 1991–2020 normals, extremes 1955–present
Month	Jan	Feb	Mar	Apr	May	Jun	Jul	Aug	Sep	Oct	Nov	Dec	Year
Record high °F (°C)	81 (27)	83 (28)	91 (33)	97 (36)	96 (36)	103 (39)	103 (39)	107 (42)	98 (37)	96 (36)	86 (30)	81 (27)	107 (42)
Mean maximum °F (°C)	71.4 (21.9)	74.4 (23.6)	81.1 (27.3)	86.2 (30.1)	90.6 (32.6)	94.6 (34.8)	96.0 (35.6)	94.8 (34.9)	90.7 (32.6)	85.4 (29.7)	78.8 (26.0)	72.6 (22.6)	97.3 (36.3)
Mean daily maximum °F (°C)	52.0 (11.1)	55.6 (13.1)	63.2 (17.3)	72.7 (22.6)	79.2 (26.2)	85.7 (29.8)	89.0 (31.7)	87.4 (30.8)	82.0 (27.8)	72.5 (22.5)	62.9 (17.2)	55.1 (12.8)	71.4 (21.9)
Daily mean °F (°C)	40.7 (4.8)	43.2 (6.2)	50.2 (10.1)	59.2 (15.1)	67.7 (19.8)	75.1 (23.9)	79.0 (26.1)	77.5 (25.3)	71.8 (22.1)	60.6 (15.9)	50.5 (10.3)	43.6 (6.4)	59.9 (15.5)
Mean daily minimum °F (°C)	29.5 (−1.4)	30.8 (−0.7)	37.2 (2.9)	45.8 (7.7)	56.2 (13.4)	64.6 (18.1)	69.0 (20.6)	67.6 (19.8)	61.6 (16.4)	48.7 (9.3)	38.0 (3.3)	32.2 (0.1)	48.4 (9.1)
Mean minimum °F (°C)	14.3 (−9.8)	18.8 (−7.3)	23.9 (−4.5)	32.8 (0.4)	43.4 (6.3)	54.3 (12.4)	61.7 (16.5)	59.8 (15.4)	49.9 (9.9)	35.1 (1.7)	25.2 (−3.8)	20.4 (−6.4)	13.0 (−10.6)
Record low °F (°C)	−10 (−23)	4 (−16)	11 (−12)	24 (−4)	33 (1)	44 (7)	52 (11)	48 (9)	40 (4)	20 (−7)	12 (−11)	5 (−15)	−10 (−23)
Average precipitation inches (mm)	4.28 (109)	3.07 (78)	4.10 (104)	3.64 (92)	4.06 (103)	4.21 (107)	6.14 (156)	5.86 (149)	5.89 (150)	3.47 (88)	3.59 (91)	3.82 (97)	52.13 (1,324)
Average snowfall inches (cm)	2.2 (5.6)	0.1 (0.25)	0.1 (0.25)	0.0 (0.0)	0.0 (0.0)	0.0 (0.0)	0.0 (0.0)	0.0 (0.0)	0.0 (0.0)	0.0 (0.0)	0.0 (0.0)	0.8 (2.0)	3.2 (8.1)
Average precipitation days (≥ 0.01 in)	10.3	9.0	10.1	8.6	10.1	10.1	11.4	10.3	8.2	7.7	8.3	10.6	114.7
Average snowy days (≥ 0.1 in)	1.2	0.4	0.1	0.0	0.0	0.0	0.0	0.0	0.0	0.0	0.1	0.4	2.2
Source 1: NOAA
Source 2: National Weather Service

== Demographics ==
Historical population
Census	Pop.	Note	%±
1880	352		—
1890	478		35.8%
1900	754		57.7%
1910	1,441		91.1%
1920	1,423		−1.2%
1930	1,533		7.7%
1940	1,711		11.6%
1950	2,229		30.3%
1960	3,302		48.1%
1970	3,103		−6.0%
1980	4,091		31.8%
1990	4,756		16.3%
2000	6,973		46.6%
2010	16,116		131.1%
2020	26,307		63.2%
2025 (est.)	32,633	▲	24.0%
U.S. Decennial Census

=== 2020 census ===
As of the 2020 census, Clayton had a population of 26,307. The median age was 34.7 years. 27.5% of residents were under the age of 18 and 11.4% of residents were 65 years of age or older. For every 100 females there were 89.9 males, and for every 100 females age 18 and over there were 85.2 males age 18 and over.

99.4% of residents lived in urban areas, while 0.6% lived in rural areas.

There were 9,915 households in Clayton, of which 40.4% had children under the age of 18 living in them. Of all households, 48.4% were married-couple households, 15.3% were households with a male householder and no spouse or partner present, and 29.2% were households with a female householder and no spouse or partner present. About 25.1% of all households were made up of individuals and 8.7% had someone living alone who was 65 years of age or older.

There were 10,576 housing units, of which 6.2% were vacant. The homeowner vacancy rate was 2.2% and the rental vacancy rate was 8.0%.

Clayton racial composition
Race	Number	Percentage
White (non-Hispanic)	15,193	57.6%
Black or African American (non-Hispanic)	6,219	23.6%
Native American	142	0.5%
Asian	420	1.60%
Pacific Islander	11	0.04%
Other/Mixed	4,322	16.4%
Hispanic or Latino	3,756	14.3%

=== Demographic estimates ===
A 2019 Census Bureau estimate reported an average household size of 3.04 persons.

=== 2010 census ===
As of the 2010 census, there were 16,116 residents living within the Town of Clayton. There were 5,944 households, with an average of 2.57 persons per household. The population density was 1,192.8 inhabitants per square mile (460.5/km^{2}) with an inventory of 6,648 housing units at an average density of 492 per square mile (190/km^{2}). The racial makeup of the town was 69.5% White, 21.8% African American, 10.7% Hispanic or Latino 0.4% American Indian, 1.4% Asian, 0% Pacific Islander.

Of the 5,944 households in the 2010 census, 44% had children under the age of 18 living with them, 50.6% were married couples living together, 15.2% had a female householder with no husband present, and 30% were non-families. 25.4% of non-family households were made up of householders living alone. 16.3% of households had individuals 65 years of age or older.

The age demographics of the 2010 census determined that 32.9% were under the age of 19, 4.9% were aged 20 to 24, 32.8% aged 25 to 44, 20.8% aged 45 to 64, and 8.5% were 65 years of age or older. The median age was 34.9 years. Females made up 52.5% of the population while males made up 47.5% of the population.

The median income for a household in the town was $53,101, and the median income for a family was $64,856. Males had a median income of $46,108 versus $40,839 for females. The per capita income for the town was $26,234. These figures put Town of Clayton well ahead of the North Carolina averages for the same categories.

== Arts and culture ==
Sites listed on the National Register of Historic Places include:

- Clayton Banking Company Building
- Clayton Graded School and Clayton Grammar School-Municipal Auditorium
- Clayton Historic District
- Cleveland School
- Ellington-Ellis Farm
- Walter R. and Eliza Smith Moore House
- Sanders-Hairr House
- Stallings-Carpenter House

== Parks and recreation ==
Bailey and Sarah William Preserve has seven miles of multi-use trails for walking and biking.

Clayton Community Center is a 32,000 sq. ft. facility that has a 1/16th mile indoor track, a fitness center, large gymnasium, an art and potter classroom. It also includes a garden with a greenhouse!

Clayton Community Park is a 42-arce park, which offers a variety of activities including a 1/2 mile paved trail, three baseball fields, volleyball courts, picnic shelter, unpaved wetlands, and two playground areas.

East Clayton Community Park features soccer and baseball fields, a disc golf course, picnic areas, a walking trail, and a playground.

Clayton also has the Clayton Municipal Park, Clayton River Walk on the Neuse, Clemmons Educational State Forest, Donald "Clyde" Sinclair Park, the East Clayton Community Park, the East Clayton Dog Park, Harmony Playground, Neuse Adventures Canoe & Kayak Rentals, the Pine Hollow Golf Club, the Riverwood Golf & Athletic Club, the Sam's Branch Greenway Trail, the Neuse Country Club, and the Triangle Adventures.

== Government ==
=== Town Council ===
Name	Office	Term start	Term end	Reference
Jody McLeod	Mayor	December 2003	2027	
Amanda Underwood	Councilwoman	December 2025	2029	
Gretchen Williams	Councilwoman	December 2023	2027	
Ruth Anderson	Councilwoman	December 2023	2027	
Andria Archer	Mayor Pro Tem	December 2025	2029	
Porter Casey	Councilman	December 2025	2029	

== Education ==
- Academy of Hope
- American Leadership Academy - Johnston
- Clayton High School
- Cleveland High School
- Clayton Middle School
- Cooper Academy
- Cleveland Elementary School
- East Clayton Elementary School
- Johnston Charter Academy
- Lifespring Academy
- Polenta Elementary School
- Powhatan Elementary School
- River Dell Elementary School
- Riverwood Elementary School
- Riverwood Middle School
- Swift Creek Middle
- Thales Academy
- West Clayton Elementary School

== Notable people ==
- Chris Archer, Major League Baseball player
- Valerie Ashby, chemist and President of University of Maryland, Baltimore County
- Sam Beddingfield (1933-2012), test pilot and a pioneering aerospace engineer
- Gary Clark, NBA player
- William Dodd (1869–1940), historian and United States Ambassador to Germany from 1933 to 1937
- Johnny Dutch, USA Track & Field athlete
- Vern Duncan (1890-1954), former Major League Baseball player
- Douglas Ellington (1886-1960), architect noted for his work in the Art Deco style
- Eric Ellington (1889-1913), pioneer of military aviation and namesake of Ellington Field in Houston, Texas
- Omarion Hampton, Los Angeles Chargers and University of North Carolina running back
- Kendra "Keni" Harrison, set the world record in the women's 100 metres hurdles at the London Grand Prix
- Corey Lee, MLB player
- Jaylee Burley Mead (1929–2012), astronomer at NASA's Goddard Space Flight Center
- Evan Philips, MLB Player
- Rodney Rowe, track and field sprinter
- Ryan Fournier, American political commentator
- James Talacek, professional aquanaut
- Kodi Whitley, Major League Baseball pitcher
