= Jaylee Burley Mead =

American astronomer

- Jaylee Mead, from her 2012 NASA obituary.
- Born: Barbara Jaylee Montague; June 14, 1929; Clayton, North Carolina, US
- Died: September 14, 2012; Washington, D.C., US
- Other names: Jaylee M. Burley (before 1968)
- Occupation: astronomer

Barbara Jaylee Montague Burley Mead (June 14, 1929 – September 14, 2012) was an American astronomer with a long career at NASA's Goddard Space Flight Center. She was also a noted arts patron, a major donor to theatres and cultural organizations in the Washington, D.C. area.

== Early life ==
Barbara Jaylee Montague was born near Clayton, North Carolina, the daughter of Roger Montague and Barbara Montague. Her parents ran a general store. She attended the University of North Carolina at Greensboro (then a women's college), earning a bachelor's degree in mathematics in 1951. She earned a master's degree in education from Stanford University in 1954, and completed a doctorate in astronomy at Georgetown University in 1970, studying under Vera Rubin.

== Career ==
Jaylee Burley Mead worked at NASA's Goddard Space Flight Center from its beginning in 1959 (she had employee badge number 0010). She created a database of stars and galaxies which remains in use, and cataloging transient lunar phenomena (TLP). She was also active in the Goddard amateur theatre troupe. She also worked at the National Space Science Data Center, where she was assistant chief of the Laboratory for Astronomy and Solar Physics, associate chief of the Space Data and Computing Division, and coordinator of the International Ultraviolet Explorer's Regional Data-Analysis Facilities. In 1986, she was awarded the NASA Medal for Scientific Leadership. She also received the Women in Aerospace Lifetime Achievement Award, and the Goddard Award for Outstanding Service.

Jaylee Burley Mead and her second husband founded the Mead Family Foundation in 1989, and were major donors to theatres and other cultural organizations in the Washington, D.C. area. Their gift to the Arena Stage was "the largest, single, private gift ever bestowed on an American stage," according to Playbill. Jaylee Mead chaired the board of the Studio Theatre from 1994 to 2000. The Arena Stage at the Mead Center for American Theatre and the Mead Theatre at the Studio Theatre complex were named for them, as were several other performance spaces and programs. They also sponsored a lecture series on space exploration at the National Air and Space Museum. Jaylee Mead served on the boards of the Carnegie Institution for Science and the National Children's Museum.

== Publications ==
Publications by Burley Mead included "Apparent Lunar Activity: Historical Review" (Proceedings of the National Academy of Sciences 1966, with Barbara M. Middlehurst), Chronological Catalog of Reported Lunar Events (NASA 1968, with Barbara M. Middlehurst, Patrick Moore, and Barbara L. Welther), Statistics of the region of Lacerta OB1 (NASA report 1969, with G. V. Coyne and Michele Kaufman), "Advances in ultraviolet astronomy: four years of IUE research" (NASA 1982, with Yoji Kondo and Robert D. Chapman), "Future of ultraviolet astronomy based on six years of IUE research" (NASA 1984, with Yoji Kondo and Robert D. Chapman), and Catalog of infrared observations (NASA 1987, with Daniel Y. Gezari and Marion Schmitz).

== Personal life ==
Jaylee Montague married Gordon Burley; they divorced. She married again, to fellow scientist Gilbert Mead, in 1968. Gilbert Mead died in 2007. She died from heart failure in 2012, in Washington, D.C., aged 83 years.
