= Brooklyn Historic District =

Historic district in North Carolina, United States

- U.S. National Register of Historic Places
- U.S. Historic district
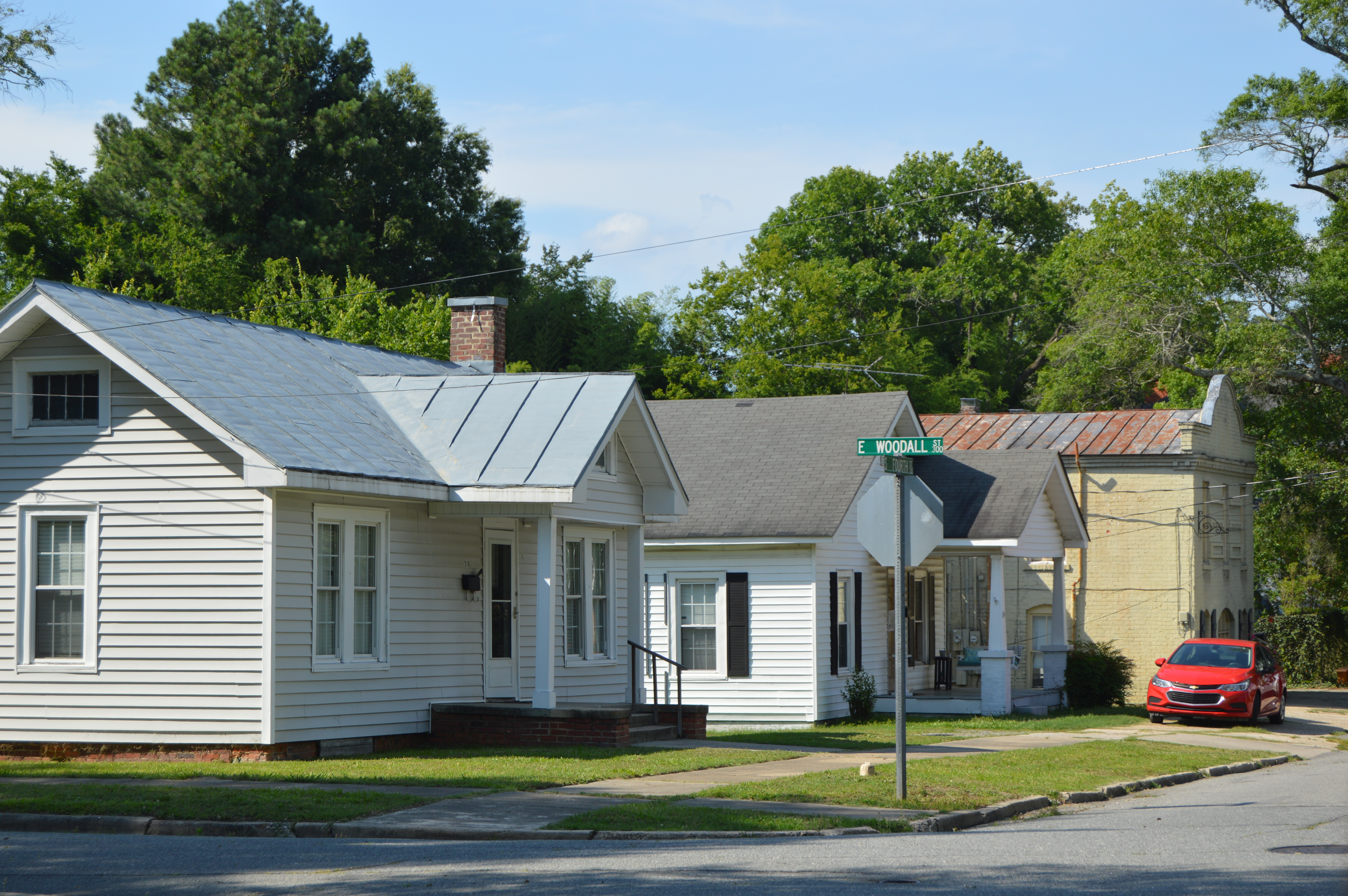
- Fourth Street north of Woodall Street

- Location within North Carolina Location within the United States
- Location: Roughly bounded by Spring Branch Creek, S. Fifth St., S. Third St., and Lee St., Smithfield, North Carolina
- Coordinates: 35°30′22″N 78°20′52″W
- Area: 30 acres (12 ha)
- Built: 1912
- Architect: George Barbour, et.al.
- Architectural style: Early Commercial, Queen Anne, et.al.
- NRHP reference No.: 00000443
- Added to NRHP: May 5, 2000

Brooklyn Historic District is a national historic district located at Smithfield, Johnston County, North Carolina. It encompasses 88 contributing buildings in a predominantly residential section of Smithfield. It includes notable examples of Queen Anne style architecture and buildings dating from about the 1870s through the 1940s. Located in the district is the separately listed Hood-Strickland House. Other notable buildings include the Smithfield Elementary School (1912-1913), the Smithfield Steam Laundry (c. 1902), Woodall-Fleming House (c. 1870), Davis-Boyette House (1889), Ellington-Holland House (c. 1900), Willis Henry Austin House (1912), Dr. Thel Hooks House (1916), and Ragsdale-McLemore House (1922).

It was listed on the National Register of Historic Places in 2000.
