= The Clayton Center =

Performing arts and conference center in North Carolina, US

Coordinates: 35.6524°N 78.4604°W

The Clayton Center is a performing arts and conference center in Clayton, North Carolina. The center is managed by the Town of Clayton and is located in the same complex as Town Hall at 111 East 2nd Street, Clayton. The venue serves patrons in Johnston County, North Carolina, and beyond, drawing heavily from the Triangle area.

The building is the former Clayton Elementary School, which closed in 1997. The center was created through a public-private partnership between the Town of Clayton and the Clayton Cultural Arts Foundation. Fundraising support for the center is conducted through the Clayton Cultural Arts Foundation. The center opened in December 2002.

Receptions, trade shows and weddings are held in the center's main lobby adjacent to the glass atrium. Meeting rooms are located on the center's first and second floor. The center's 600-seat auditorium is available for large presentations, film screenings, concerts, pageants and other performing arts.

Among its many operations, The Clayton Center presents a Palladian Series each season featuring internationally touring artists.

== Past performances ==
- Capitol Steps
- Voices of Glory
- David Sedaris
- Doc Watson
- Riders in the Sky
- Chris Thile
- The Flying Karamazov Brothers
- Harlem Gospel Choir
- Heartland
- Eileen Ivers
- James Gregory (comedian)
- Jesse Cook
- Jim Brickman
- B. J. Thomas
- Ricky Skaggs
- Shawn Colvin
- Kathy Mattea
- Johnny Winter
- Ruthie Foster
- Eric Bibb
- Mike Farris (musician)
- John Pizzarelli
- Blind Boys of Alabama
- Colin Hay
- Tommy Emmanuel
- Dianne Reeves
- James Cotton
- Robert Cray
- Jake Shimabukuro
- Ladysmith Black Mambazo
- Nanci Griffith

== See also ==
- List of concert halls
