= Sound of The Rising Sun =

The Manual

Studio album by Drique London
- Released: May 13, 2015
- Recorded: 2012–2015
- Genre: Hip hop
- Length: 36:51
- Producer: Majestic, U'Nique Music, The Candidates

Sound of The Rising Sun is the debut LP by Raleigh hip-hop artist Drique London. The album was released digitally on May 13, 2015, by DOC Music Group. It features Carlitta Durand, Carrington, Fresh Daily, Like Of Pac Div, Justin Alexander and Donovan McCray. Production was handled by Majestic, U’nique Music & The Candidates. The album has found its way on numerous hiphop sites such as 2DopeBoyz, Funkmaster Flex, DJ Enuff, and DJ Booth

The first single off the album was "You Don’t Know". The second single was "Laybach".

== Music videos ==
A video was shot for “You Don’t Know" in North Carolina by Vinark Motion Pictures. A second video, "LayBach" ft Carringtion, was also planned.

== Critical reception ==
Grungecake magazine stated that the album was short and sweet. London was able to show his skills by switching flows and riding the beat differently on each song. They would also go on to write that Drique London is a relatable artist, in the vein of most of North Carolina’s most known Hip-Hop artists: J. Cole, Little Brother (group) and Rapsody.

== Track listing ==
#	Title	Producer(s)	Featured guest(s)	Time
1	"Preamble”	U’nique Music		1:14
2	”IXIIV”	Majestic		3:30
3	”You Don’t Know”	The Candidates		3:48
4	”Celebrate”	Majestic**	Carlitta Durand	4:23
5	”Breach’”	Majestic		3:33
6	”Hol’ it Down (Vintage)	Majestic	Donovan McCray, Fresh Daily, Like (of PacDiv)	5:00
7	"Mysterious Vibes”	The Candidates	Justin Alexander	3:47
8	”LayBach”	Majestic	Carringtion	4:08
9	”Iz U Ridin’”	U’nique Music	Carrington	3:44
10	”Negguz”	Majestic**	Carrington	5:04

• (**) designates additional instrumentation from U’nique Music
