= MaDrique =

- Born: August 2, 1991 (age 33); Selma, North Carolina
- Occupation(s): Rapper, songwriter
- Website: madrique.com

MaDrique Dashaun Sanders (born August 2, 1991) is an American hip hop artist. He has been featured in the annual Hopscotch Music Festival, Justus League Radio, and has been a part of North Carolina State University radio show WKNC 88.1 and North Carolina Central University Audionet Ch.9 He describes his style as "down south resident, with up north flavor", doing his best to separate himself from the rest.

== Early life ==
Sanders was born in Selma, North Carolina, and raised back and forth between Queens, New York and Raleigh, North Carolina until he was a teenager settling in Raleigh for good. At the young age of four, he grew a love for hip-hop and rap music. As he turned 5 years old, one day he was sitting in his bedroom watching BET when Snoop Dogg's "Gin and Juice" music video appeared; from that day forward, he knew what he wanted to be. It was when he moved to Raleigh officially as a young teen, where he attended Millbrook High School, that he started his own high school label titled, World Face Ent. WorldFace's success enabled Sanders to quietly take over the sounds of the local areas as the group drifted apart, from there he would begin to channel success on a single route. After pushing with local NC promoters, rappers, producers, as well as well-knowns from the DMV and NY, Sanders hit newfound success.

== Music career ==
In 2009, Sanders endured on a new musical path. He was able to gain more local exposure and he would soon find himself performing shows, interviews, photo shoots, and radio spots—a life which he could never have dreamed of in his earlier days, a pathway described as DOC Music (Dreams Of Children).

=== Nike SB: The Mixtape (2010) ===
Sanders released his long-awaited mixtape the Nike SB, in March 2010. It's widely regarded as his most anticipated release due to the many putbacks that occurred from its original release date in 2008. The tape was regarded by many to be the start of a new evolution in Sanders' style, and could only mean great things to come.

=== The Manual (2011) ===
The Manual was released on September 7, 2011. The first single of "The Manual" titled, "Red Chucks" was produced by Majestic. A video was shot for the single and was debuted at Sucker Free Sundays with DJ Flash of the Justus League on the turntables. The second single featured King Mez and Tab-One of Kooley High, both widely respected artists out of the Carolina Hip Hop scene. Promotion for the Manual saw Sanders see cosigns from Khrysis and Rapsody, & of 9th Wonder's, It's A Wonderful World Music Group (IWWMG) and a promotional spot from Big K.R.I.T. Sanders views this project as a welcome change to his sound but a premature one. As he felt the projects release came during a tough time period in his life.

=== Sound of The Rising Sun (2015) ===
Sound of The Rising Sun is the debut LP from Sanders. It was released on May 13, 2015. The LP features ten-tracks of all original material. Production was handled from In-house producers Majestic, U'nique Music and The Candidates. The LP also had guest features from Carlitta Durand, Fresh Daily, Like Of Pac Div, Justin Alexander, Carrington and Donovan McCray.

== Discography ==
=== EP ===
- "Gordian Knot" (2012)
- "Payton & Kemp" (2012)

=== Studio album ===
- "Sound of The Rising Sun " (2015)
