= Clayton Historic District (Clayton, North Carolina) =

Historic district in North Carolina, United States

- U.S. National Register of Historic Places
- U.S. Historic district
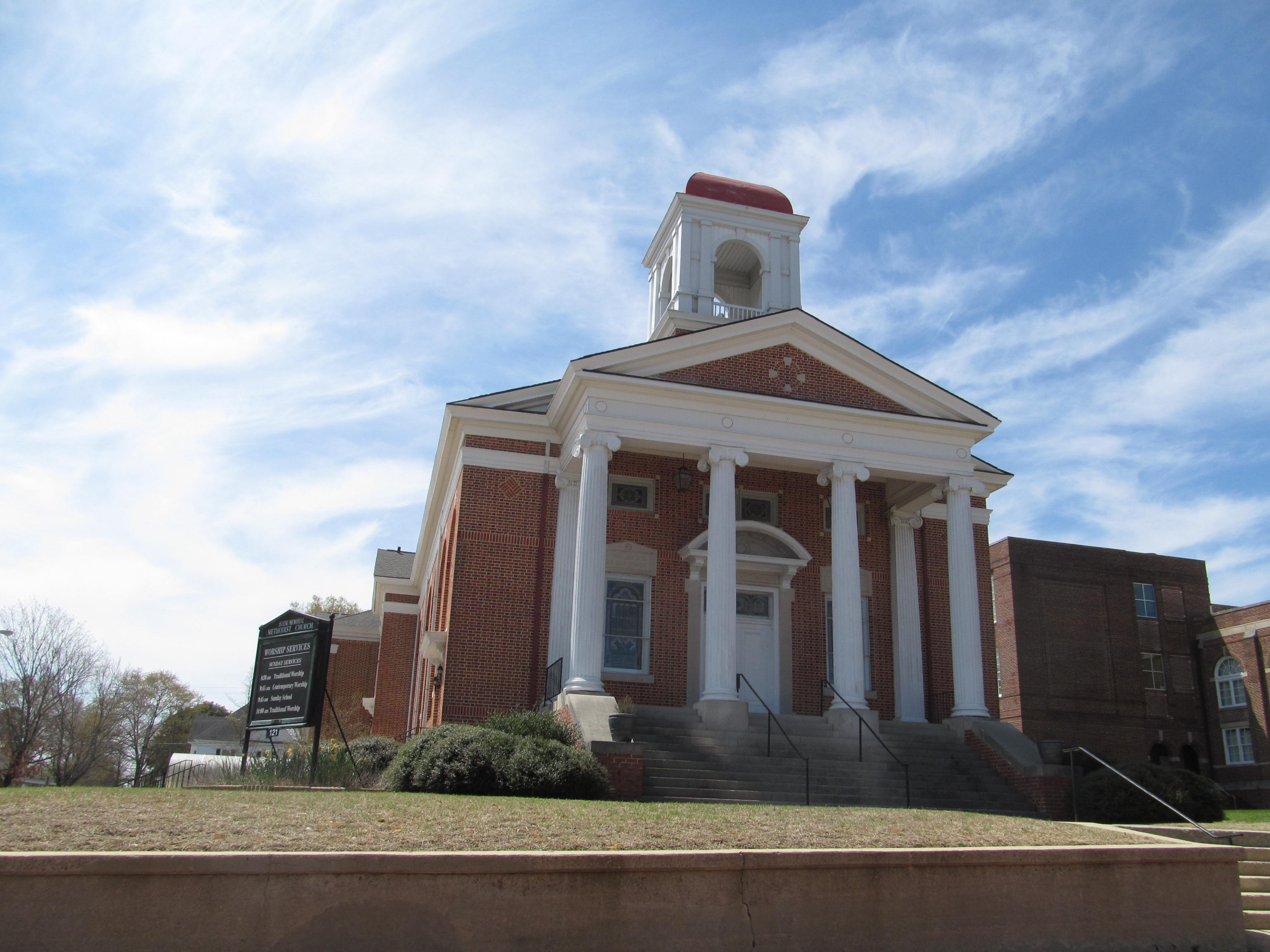
- Horne Memorial United Methodist Church

- Location within North Carolina Location within the United States
- Location: Bounded by Mulberry St, W Barnes St, Mill St, S Lombard St, Blanch St, Clayton, North Carolina
- Coordinates: 35°39′03″N 78°27′23″W
- Area: 110 acres (45 ha)
- Architect: George W. Ellis, et al.
- Architectural style: Bungalow/craftsman, Late Victorian
- NRHP reference No.: 10000314
- Added to NRHP: June 7, 2010

Clayton Historic District is a national historic district located at Clayton, Johnston County, North Carolina. It encompasses 271 contributing buildings, 2 contributing sites, and 1 contributing structures in the town of Clayton. It includes notable examples of Late Victorian and Bungalow / American Craftsman style architecture and buildings dating from about 1850 to 1959. It includes commercial, residential, ecclesiastical, and educational structures. Located in the district are the separately listed Clayton Banking Company Building and the Clayton Graded School and Clayton Grammar School-Municipal Auditorium. Other notable buildings include the B.M. Robertson Mule Company stable, Mayo House, the Young House, Horne Memorial United Methodist Church, First Baptist Church of Clayton, and First Missionary Baptist Church.

It was listed on the National Register of Historic Places in 2010.
