= Princeton High School (North Carolina) =

American public school in North Carolina

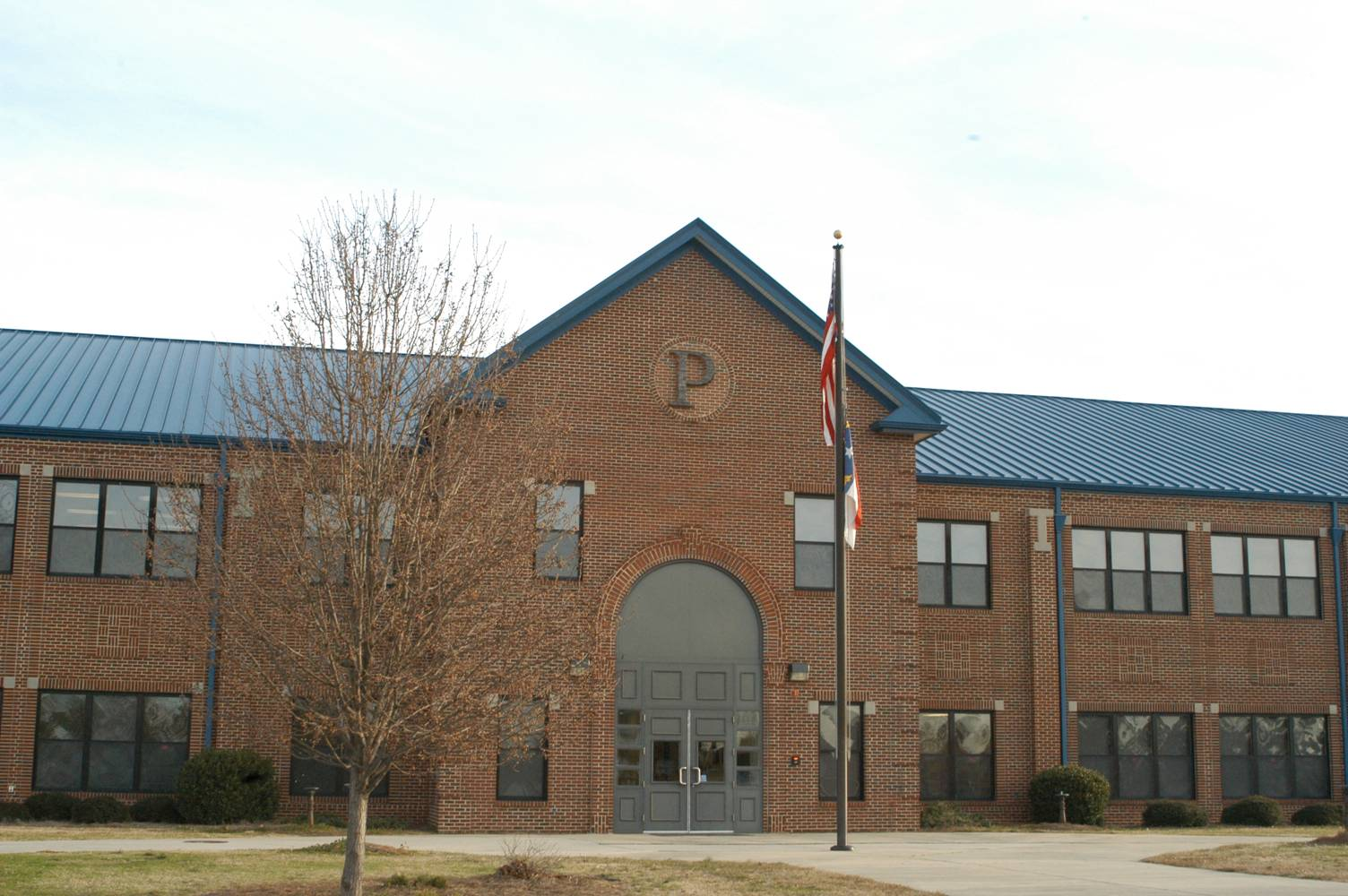

Location
- 101 Dr Donnie H. Jones Jr Blvd; Princeton, North Carolina 27569; United States; 35°28′04″N 78°09′27″W

Information
- Other name: PHS
- School type: Public
- Motto: "Building a community of excellence, one student at a time"
- Established: 1923 (103 years ago)
- CEEB code: 343180
- Principal: Heather Anders
- Faculty: 66
- Teaching staff: 64.92 (FTE)
- Grades: 6–12
- Enrollment: 1,021 (2023-2024)
- Student to teacher ratio: 15.73
- Colors: Blue and gold
- Fight song: Go Dawgs!
- Mascot: Bulldog
- Website: phs.johnston.k12.nc.us

Princeton High School is a public high school located in Princeton, North Carolina, United States. It serves grades 6–12 and is part of the Johnston County School District. Princeton High School has 1,465 students. Princeton Elementary School, grades K–5, located a few miles away, became a separate school at the start of the 2008–2009 school year.

== History ==
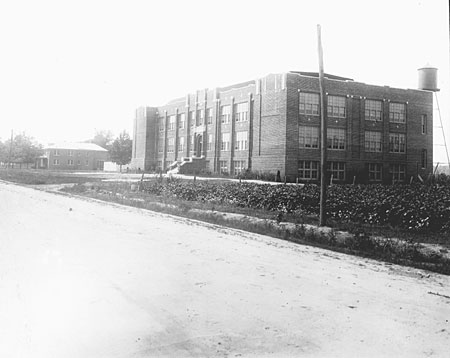
Old Princeton School, circa 1930, taken along what is Dr. Donnie H. Jones, Jr. Blvd. today

The first graduating class came in 1923 and consisted of four girls and one boy. Miss Myrtle Nicholson served as the principal for two school years, 1921–1922 and 1922–1923. Following Miss Nicholson's departure came M.P. Young. Young became the second official principal in 1924, and had previously served as a teacher at the school. In 1925, when the school was officially accredited by the state of North Carolina, there were forty-five students. The current building stands in front of where the original once stood. The old building was demolished in 1998.

== Principals ==
- J. U. Teague
- Mr. Bridges
- Myrtle Nicholson (1921–1922)
- Blanche Penny (1923)
- Marvin Pleasant Young (1924–1943)
- Stephen Clarence Woodard (1944–1947)
- Lyman J. Worthington (1948–1966)
- John Turnage (1967–1969)
- Blani Moye (1970)
- Fred Leroy Bartholomew (1971–1998)
- Kirk Denning (1999–2016)
- Jarvis Ellis (2016–2026)
- Heather Anders (2026-present)

== Athletics ==
The Princeton Bulldogs are a part of the North Carolina High School Athletic Association. The Bulldogs compete in the 2-A classification. The Bulldogs have won several state championships in various sports. This is a list of the sports offered at Princeton High School:

Varsity: Baseball (boys); Basketball; Cheerleading (girls); Cross Country; Football (boys); Golf; Soccer; Softball (girls); Swimming; Tennis; Track; Volleyball (girls); Wrestling (boys)	Junior Varsity: Baseball (boys); Basketball (boys); Cheerleading (girls); Football (boys); Volleyball (girls)

=== Baseball ===
The Bulldogs have won three state baseball championships (1992, 1994, 2007), and earned one state runner-up (1993).

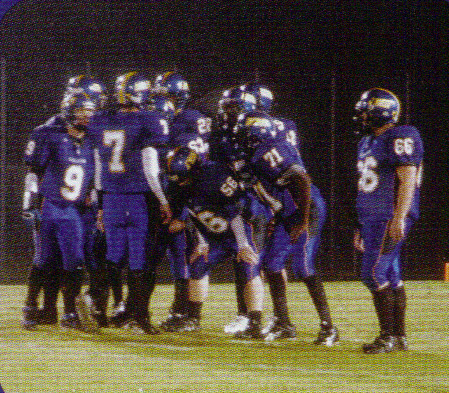
Football team huddles before next play (2007)

=== Football ===
The Bulldogs have been to the 1-A football state runner-up few times, but have never won a state championship. The Bulldogs have not competed in a football state championship game since 1979.
