= Powhatan, North Carolina =

Unincorporated community in North Carolina, US

Coordinates: 35°36′50″N 78°25′03″W

Powhatan is an unincorporated community in Johnston County, North Carolina, United States, centered on the intersection of Powhatan Road and U.S. Route 70 Business, equidistant from the towns of Clayton and Wilson's Mills. It lies at an elevation of 302 feet (92 m).

The community is home to a large athletics complex on Powhatan Road, as well as several large chemical/pharmaceutical plants, including the Grifols plant on US 70 Business, and Novo Nordisk on Powhatan Road. Just east of the community is the eastern terminus of the Clayton Bypass (mainline US 70).
