= Eric Ellington =

- Born: Eric Lamar Ellington; May 15, 1889; Clayton, North Carolina
- Died: November 24, 1913 (aged 24); San Diego, California
- Resting place: Clayton City Cemetery; Clayton, North Carolina Johnston County
- Other name: "Polly"
- Occupations: Navy (Ensign); Army officer Lieutenant; [aviator]
- Years active: 1905-13

Eric Ellington (May 15, 1889 – November 24, 1913) was a United States Naval and later Army officer. He was one of the first U. S. servicemen to be killed in an airplane crash. A United States Naval Academy graduate, his nickname at the Academy was "Polly".

== Early life ==
Ellington was born in North Carolina in 1889 to Sheriff Jesse T. Ellington and his second wife Sallie Williamson. He had six half siblings from his father's first marriage. His mother died in 1901 when Eric was 12 and he went to live with an older half-brother John Ellington and finished grade school. He graduated from high school in 1905 at 16.

== U.S. Navy ==
Ellington started at the Naval Academy at age 16. He graduated in 1909 third in his class and received a Bachelor's Degree. He spent the next two years in mandated Naval being commissioned an Ensign in June 1911. He resigned his commission in November 1911 to accept a commission the U. S. Army.

== U. S. Army ==
After being commissioned a 2nd Lieutenant in the Army, Ellington was stationed at Fort Sam Houston. This lasted until December 1912 when he moved to College Park, Maryland. At College Park Ellington was placed in the Aeronautical Division, U. S. Signal Corps. Ellington transferred to San Diego where he qualified as an Army pilot in August 1913 and later an instructor.

== Death ==
Ellington and 2nd Lt. Hugh M. Kelly were killed at San Diego November 24, 1913 during a training flight for Kelly. Ellington was buried in Clayton, North Carolina, in the family plot.

== Legacy ==
Ellington Field Joint Reserve Base is named in honor of Lt. Eric Ellington.
