= Nowell-Mayerburg-Oliver House =

Historic house in North Carolina, United States

- U.S. National Register of Historic Places
- U.S. Historic district – Contributing property
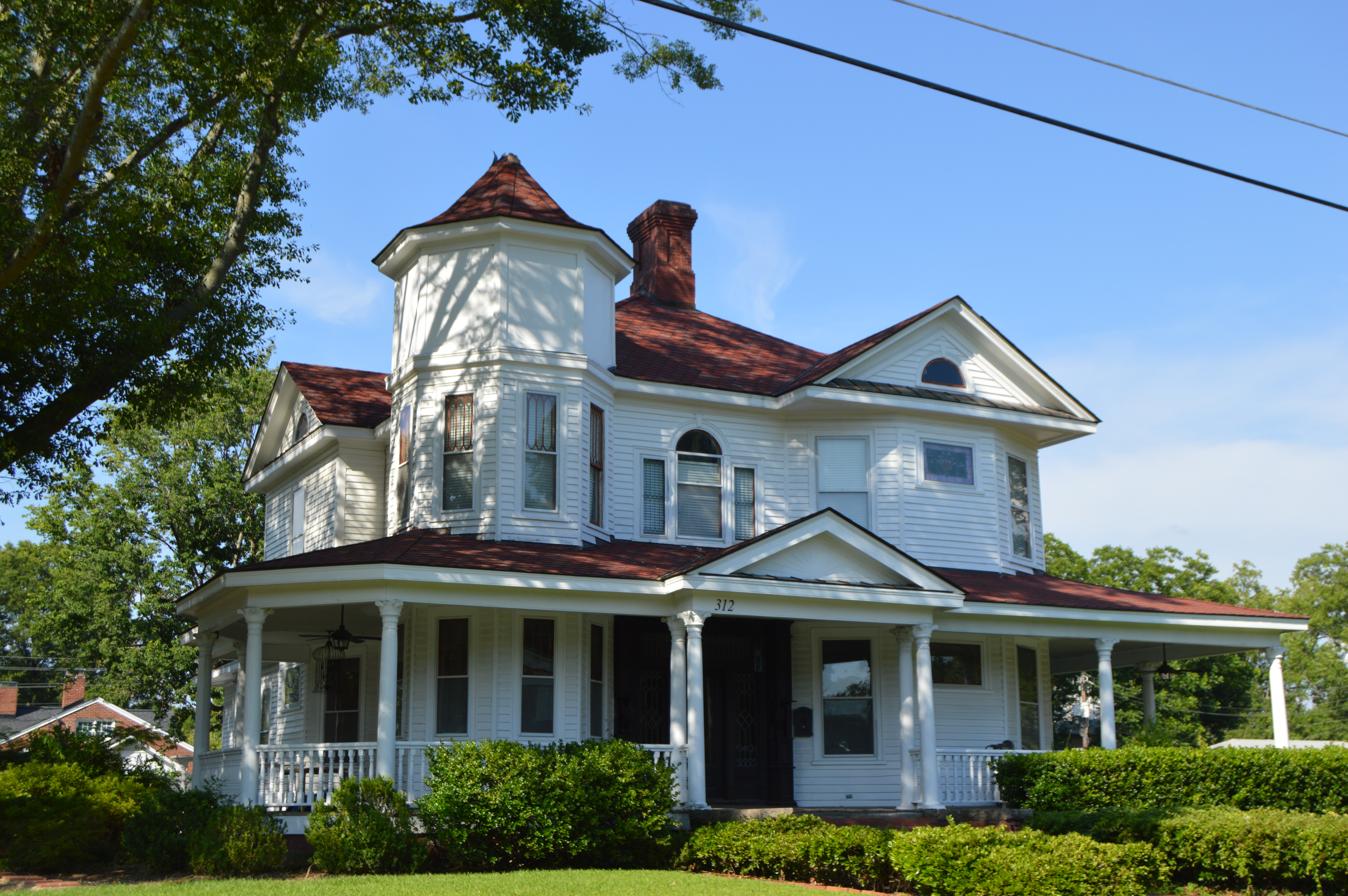
- Facade

- Location within North Carolina Location within the United States
- Location: 312 W. Anderson St., Selma, North Carolina
- Coordinates: 35°32′14″N 78°17′11″W
- Area: 0.5 acres (0.20 ha)
- Built: c. 1912
- Architect: Albert Atkinson
- Architectural style: Queen Anne
- MPS: Selma, North Carolina MRA
- NRHP reference No.: 82003478
- Added to NRHP: June 24, 1982

Nowell-Mayerburg-Oliver House is a historic home located at Selma, Johnston County, North Carolina. It was built about 1912, and is a two-story, 2 1/2-bay, square, Queen Anne style frame dwelling. It features gabled projecting bays, a three-story octagonal stair tower, second story Palladian window, and a wrap-around porch with elegant Ionic order columns. Also on the property are the contributing garage and a small bungalow style summer house.

It was listed on the National Register of Historic Places in 1982. It is located in the West Selma Historic District.
