= Walter R. and Eliza Smith Moore House =

Historic house in North Carolina, United States

- U.S. National Register of Historic Places
- Location within North Carolina Location within the United States
- Location: 3919 Raleigh Rd., near Clayton, North Carolina
- Coordinates: 35°33′7″N 78°31′43″W
- Area: 8.2 acres (3.3 ha)
- Built: c. 1835
- Architectural style: vernacular Federal
- NRHP reference No.: 05000379
- Added to NRHP: May 4, 2005

Walter R. and Eliza Smith Moore House is a historic home located near Clayton, Johnston County, North Carolina. It was built circa 1835. It is a two-story, four-bay, single-pile, vernacular Federal style heavy timber frame dwelling. It sits on a brick foundation, is sheathed in weatherboard, and has a two-story front portico. Also on the property is a contributing meat house (c. 1835).

It was listed on the National Register of Historic Places in 2005.
