= Princeton Graded School =

Historic school building in North Carolina, United States

- U.S. National Register of Historic Places
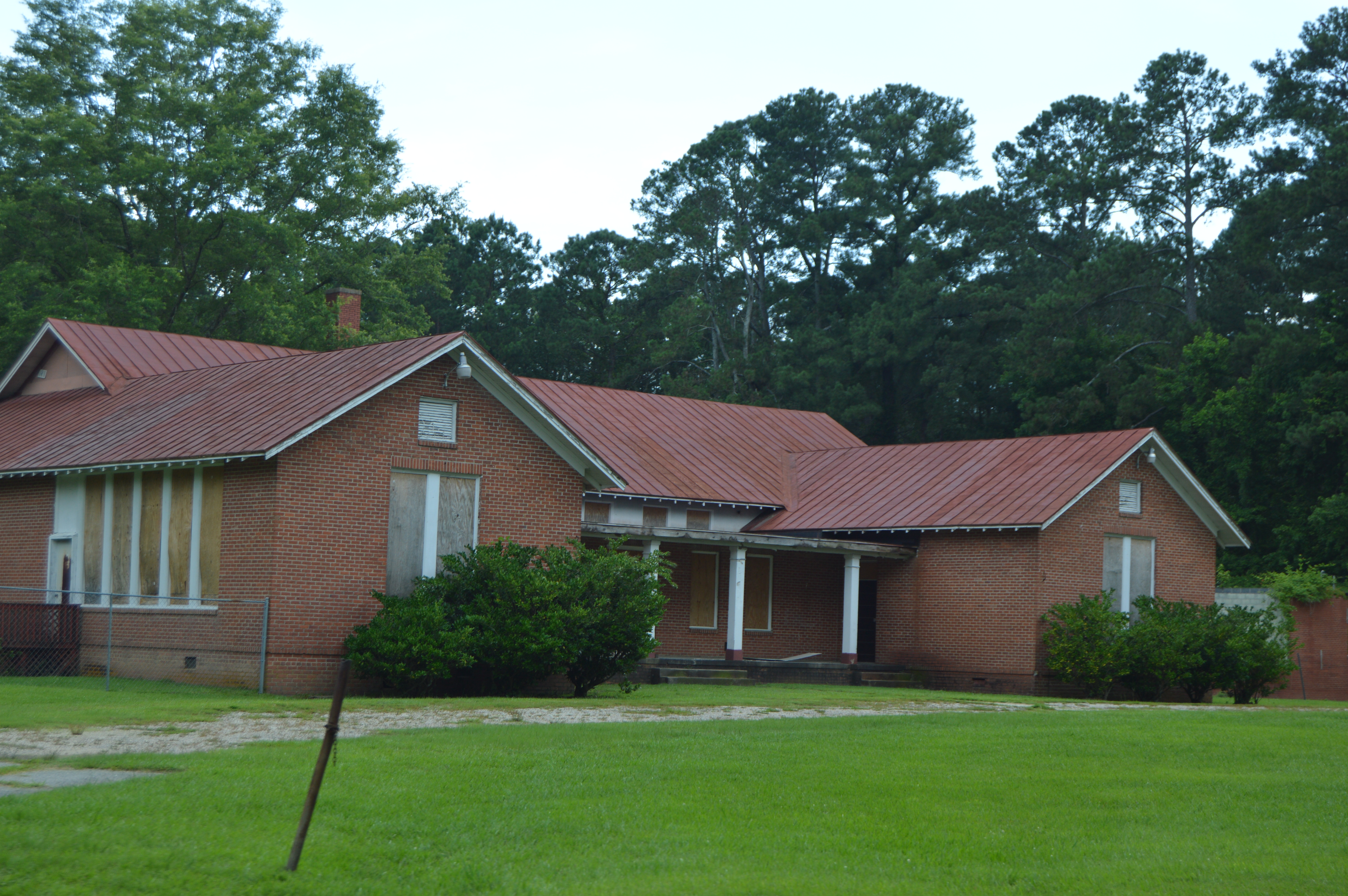
- Facade

- Location within North Carolina Location within the United States
- Location: 601-611 W. Edwards St., Princeton, North Carolina
- Coordinates: 35°28′11″N 78°10′7″W
- Area: 3.9 acres (1.6 ha)
- Built: 1925-1926
- Architect: J.P. Rogers
- Architectural style: Rosenwald School
- NRHP reference No.: 05001139
- Added to NRHP: October 4, 2005

Princeton Graded School is a historic Rosenwald school located at Princeton, Johnston County, North Carolina. It was built in 1925–1926, is a six-teacher, H-shaped frame school building sheathed in brick. The building has two additions: a one-story, brick hip-roof extension containing two bathrooms; and a low, one-story, brick, asymmetrical gable-roof section that housed the furnace. It retains an original shed-roof porch supported by Doric order posts. Also on the property are a contributing cemetery (ca. 1934-1961) with less than 20 visible markers and a septic tank (c. 1950). The school was closed by 1973.

It was listed on the National Register of Historic Places in 2005.
