= Stallings-Carpenter House =

Historic house in North Carolina, United States

- U.S. National Register of Historic Places
- Location within North Carolina
- Coordinates: 35°41′31″N 78°27′29″W
- Built: 1845
- Architectural style: Greek Revival
- NRHP reference No.: 83001894
- Added to NRHP: March 28, 1983

The Stallings-Carpenter House, located on State Road 1713 north of Clayton, Johnston County, North Carolina, was constructed in 1845 by James and Elizabeth (Jones) Stallings in the Greek Revival style. It was added to the National Register of Historic Places on 28 Mar 1983.

== History ==
According to information provided for a historic driving tour, in the early 19th century the land was owned by Moses Mordecai, a prominent Raleigh lawyer and landowner in Wake and Johnston counties. Before he died, he willed the property to his daughter Ellen, who could take ownership of the land at age 21, but only if she was married. At age 21 she was still unmarried, so the property was sold in 1850 to newlyweds James Stallings and Elizabeth Jones, who built the present house and operated the farm. By 1860 the Stallings owned 1,200 acres (4.9 km^{2}), on which they raised livestock and grew corn, peas, beans, oats, and sweet potatoes. The town of Stallings Station, present-day Clayton, was named for James Stallings. In 1904, the property was sold to Ashley Horne, a state legislator, co-founder of NC College of Agricultural and Mechanical Arts (now North Carolina State University), and unsuccessful candidate for governor. Horne did not live at Bend of the River but rented it and leased the timber rights. Several owners later, the house was restored and listed on the National Register of Historic Places. The land around the house was still in agricultural and timber use in 2008, but the 1,200 acres (4.9 km^{2}) have been subdivided.
