= William E. Smith House =

Historic house in North Carolina, United States

- U.S. National Register of Historic Places
- U.S. Historic district – Contributing property
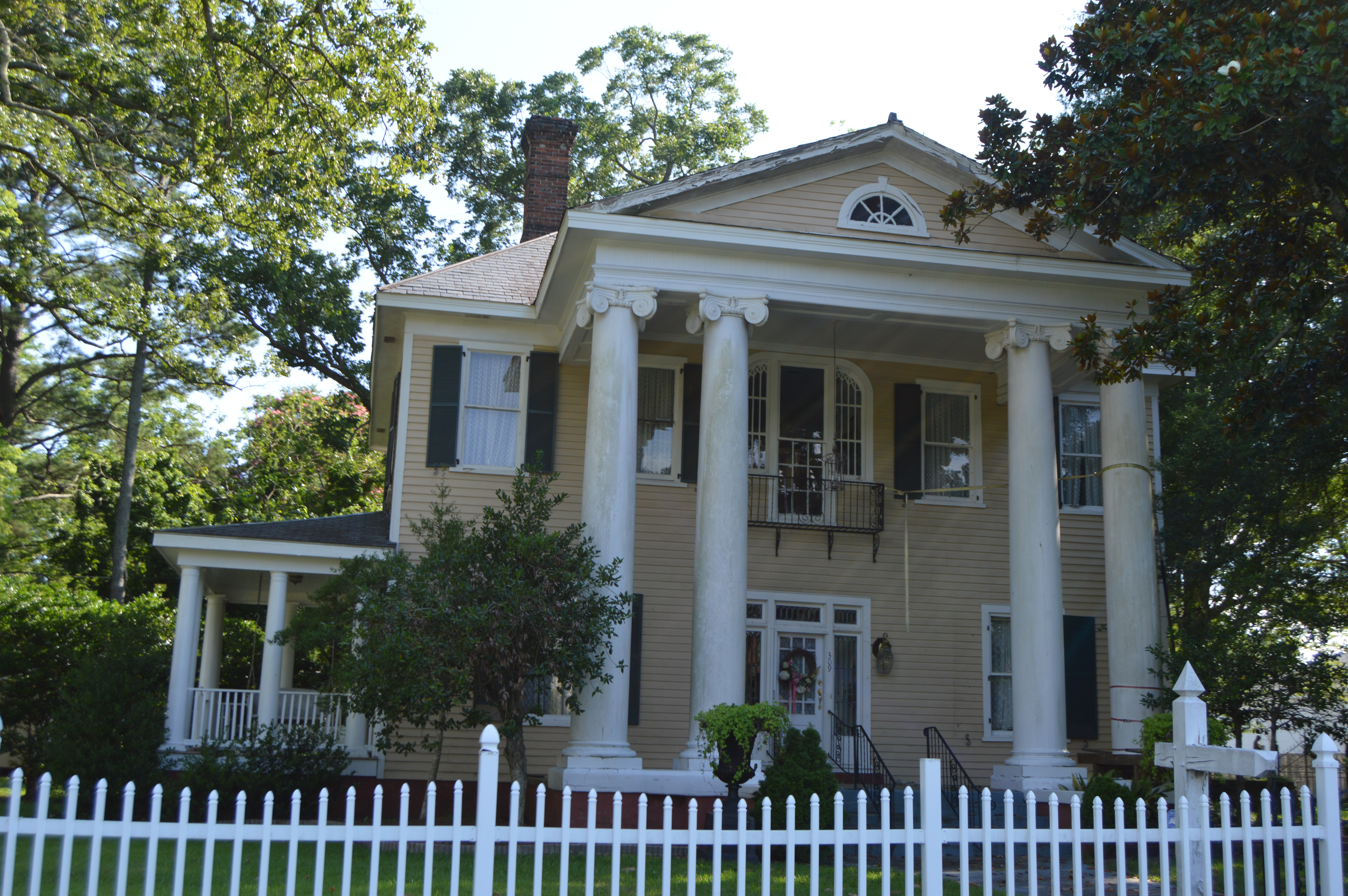
- Facade

- Location within North Carolina Location within the United States
- Location: 309 W. Railroad St., Selma, North Carolina
- Coordinates: 35°32′8″N 78°17′13″W
- Area: 0.5 acres (0.20 ha)
- Built: c 1900, c. 1912
- Architectural style: Classical Revival
- MPS: Selma, North Carolina MRA
- NRHP reference No.: 82003480
- Added to NRHP: June 24, 1982

William E. Smith House, also known as The French Country Inn, is a historic home located at Selma, Johnston County, North Carolina. It was built about 1900 and enlarged to its present size about 1912, and is a two-story, Classical Revival style frame dwelling. The front facade features an imposing pedimented portico supported by giant Ionic order columns.

It was listed on the National Register of Historic Places in 1982. It is located in the West Selma Historic District.
