= Richard B. Harrison School =

Historic school building in North Carolina, United States

- U.S. National Register of Historic Places
- Location within North Carolina Location within the United States
- Location: 605 W. Noble & 405 S. Brevard Sts., Selma, North Carolina
- Coordinates: 35°32′11″N 78°17′31″W
- Area: 6.84 acres (2.77 ha)
- Built: 1953, 1955, 1956
- Architect: Hook, W. W.; McGee, Harry Kirk; Skinner, B. Atwood
- Architectural style: Modern Movement
- NRHP reference No.: 12001089
- Added to NRHP: December 26, 2012

Richard B. Harrison School is a historic school complex located at Selma, Johnston County, North Carolina, United States. The complex consists of an agricultural building constructed in 1953 with a 1965 bricklaying shop addition; a gymnasium and classroom building built in 1955; a pump house (c. 1955); and the 1956 elementary school classroom building. Also on the property is a contributing baseball field (c. 1950). The school buildings are all one-story, Modern Movement brick veneer buildings. The complex served the African-American students of Johnston County until the system was integrated in 1970. Harrison School closed in 1987.

It was listed on the National Register of Historic Places in 2012.

In 2012, the school was renovated and transformed into the Harrison Center for Active Aging, the largest multipurpose senior center in Johnston County, North Carolina.

In 2014, the Town of Selma received the Ernest B. Messer Award by the NC Department of Health and Human Services for the dedication and renovation of the Harrison Center.
