= Barbara M. Middlehurst =

Welsh astronomer (1915–1995)

- Born: September 15, 1915; Penarth, Glamorgan, Wales
- Died: March 6, 1995; Houston, Texas
- Occupation(s): astronomer, writer

Barbara Mary Middlehurst (September 15, 1915 – March 6, 1995) was a Welsh astronomer.

== Early life ==
Barbara Mary Middlehurst was born in Penarth, Glamorgan, Wales. She attended Penarth County School for Girls and Girton College, Cambridge, where she studied mathematics. She earned a bachelor's degree in 1936 and a master's degree in 1947. She built her astronomy credentials over several years of independent reading and practice.

== Career ==
Middlehurst taught mathematics at Penarth as a young woman. During World War II she drove an ambulance in her hometown. In 1951, Middlehurst joined the staff of the observatory at the University of St. Andrews in Scotland. She moved to the United States in 1959, to join the staff at Yerkes Observatory in Wisconsin. She also worked at the Steward Observatory in Tucson, Arizona, and at the Lunar and Planetary Institute in Houston, Texas. Her research focused on Transient Lunar Phenomena (TLPs). She co-compiled a 1968 catalog of TLPs for NASA, with Jaylee Burley Mead, Patrick Moore, and Barbara Welther.

She was co-editor with Gerard Kuiper of Telescopes (1960), The Solar System III: Planets and Satellites (1961), and The Solar System IV: The Moon, Meteorites and Comets (1963). She was associate general editor of a nine-volume series, Stars and Stellar Systems (1968), again working with Kuiper, and co-edited the volume Nebulae and Interstellar Matter (with Lawrence H. Aller). She was astronomy editor for Encyclopedia Britannica.

She was active in the American Astronomical Society and in the International Astronomical Union, and served as secretary of the IAU's Commission on the Moon in 1970. She was elected a fellow of the American Geophysical Union in 1972; she was also a fellow of the Royal Astronomical Society, elected in 1949.

== Personal life ==
Middlehurst retired to Clear Lake City, Houston, where she died in 1995, aged 79 years, after a stroke. In 2009, Astro-Cymru, a Welsh Heritage Lottery project, included Middlehurst on a short list of notable Welsh astronomers for school projects, programs, and exhibits, to "celebrate 400 years of Welsh astronomy".
