= Princeton, North Carolina =

- Town
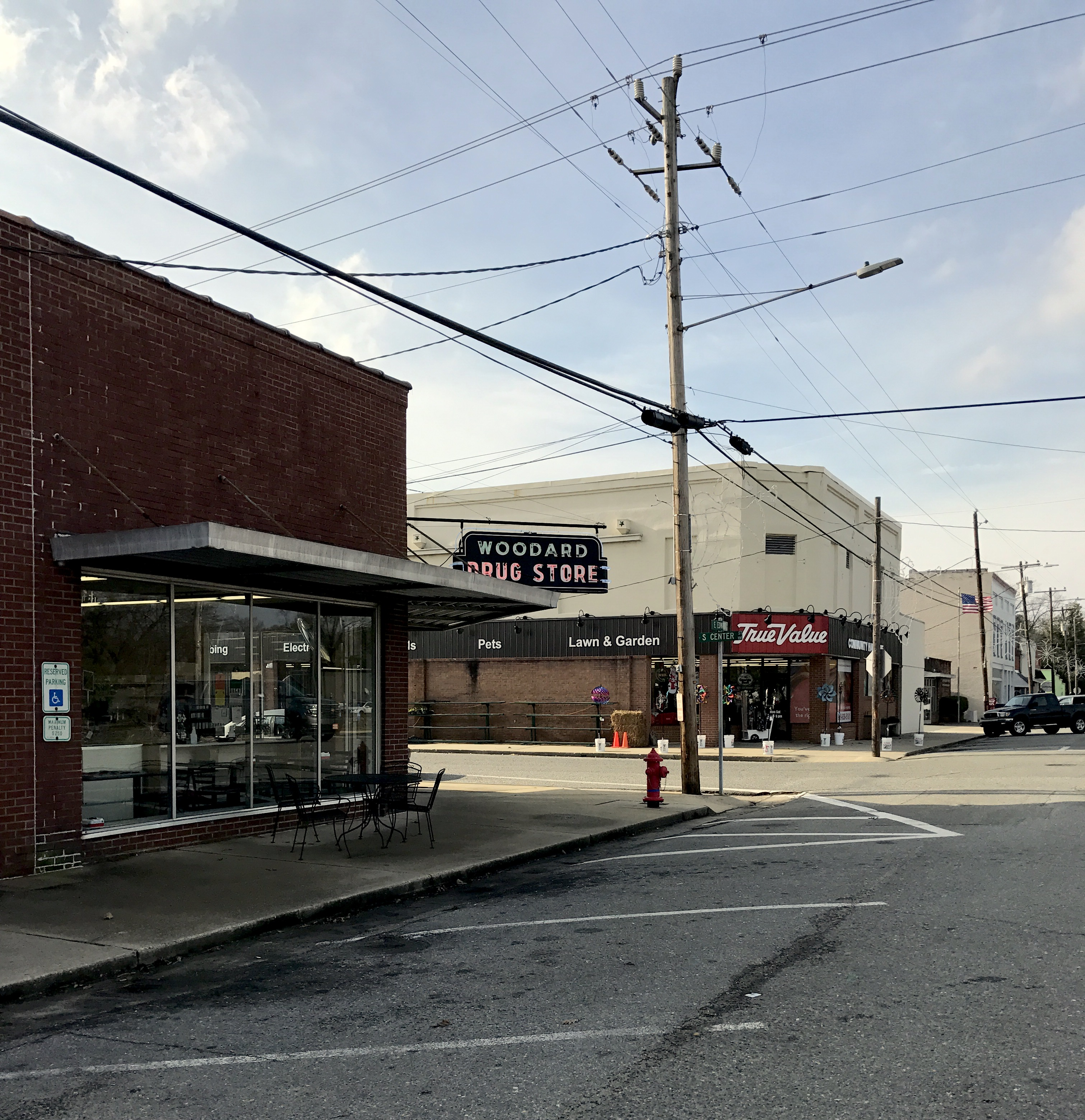

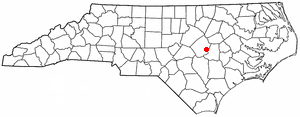
- Location of Princeton, North Carolina
- Coordinates: 35°28′00″N 78°09′41″W
- Country: United States
- State: North Carolina
- County: Johnston

Government
  - Mayor: Stacy G. Johnson

Area
  - Total: 1.16 sq mi (3.00 km^{2})
  - Land: 1.16 sq mi (3.00 km^{2})
  - Water: 0 sq mi (0.00 km^{2})
- Elevation: 151 ft (46 m)

Population (2020)
  - Total: 1,315
  - Density: 1,134.5/sq mi (438.05/km^{2})
- Time zone: UTC-5 (Eastern (EST))
  - Summer (DST): UTC-4 (EDT)
- ZIP code: 27569
- Area code: 919
- FIPS code: 37-53820
- GNIS feature ID: 2407161
- Website: www.myprincetonnc.com

Princeton is a town in Johnston County, North Carolina, United States. As of the 2020 census, Princeton had a population of 1,315. Each May the town celebrates Princeton Community Day, a festival dedicated to promoting community involvement and town pride. The town holds municipal elections in November in odd-number years to elect its mayor and town council.

== History ==
Princeton was incorporated as the town of Boon Hill in 1861, named in homage to the nearby Boon family plantation. It was renamed Princeton in 1873. In 1914 the Gurley Mill was constructed as a corn and feed mill. By 2020 it was the oldest structure in Princeton, until it burned down in November. The Princeton Graded School is listed on the National Register of Historic Places.

== Geography ==
Princeton is in eastern Johnston County. US 70 runs along the northern edge of the town, leading northwest 9 miles (14 km) to I-95 near Selma and southeast 11 miles (18 km) to Goldsboro.

According to the United States Census Bureau, the town has a total area of 1.0 square mile (2.7 km^{2}), all land.

== Demographics ==
Historical population
Census	Pop.	Note	%±
1890	248		—
1900	281		13.3%
1910	354		26.0%
1920	403		13.8%
1930	509		26.3%
1940	512		0.6%
1950	608		18.8%
1960	948		55.9%
1970	1,044		10.1%
1980	1,034		−1.0%
1990	1,181		14.2%
2000	1,066		−9.7%
2010	1,194		12.0%
2020	1,315		10.1%
U.S. Decennial Census

=== 2020 census ===
Princeton racial composition
Race	Number	Percentage
White (non-Hispanic)	830	63.12%
Black or African American (non-Hispanic)	319	24.26%
Native American	2	0.15%
Asian	8	0.61%
Pacific Islander	1	0.08%
Other/Mixed	54	4.11%
Hispanic or Latino	101	7.68%

As of the 2020 United States census, there were 1,315 people, 497 households, and 246 families residing in the town.

=== 2010 census ===
As of the census of 2010, there were 1,194 people, 502 households, and 320 families residing in the town. The population density was 1,705.7 inhabitants per square mile (658.6/km^{2}). There were 571 housing units at an average density of 815.7 per square mile (314.9/km^{2}). The racial makeup of the town was 67.2% White, 25.5% African American, 5.6% from other races, and 1.7% from two or more races. Hispanic or Latino of any race were 5.9% of the population.

There were 502 households, out of which 28.0% had children under the age of 18 living with them, 41.6% were married couples living together, 18.5% had a female householder with no husband present, and 36.3% were non-families. 31.7% of all households were made up of individuals, and 15.3% had someone living alone who was 65 years of age or older. The average household size was 2.38 and the average family size was 3.00.

In the town, the population was spread out, with 26.0% under the age of 18, 8.5% from 18 to 24, 24.7% from 25 to 44, 23.6% from 45 to 64, and 17.3% who were 65 years of age or older. The median age was 38.4 years. For every 100 females, there were 76.6 males. For every 100 females age 18 and over, there were 74.4 males age 18 and over.

The median income for a household in the town was $32,143, and the median income for a family was $38,063. Males had a median income of $26,726 versus $20,690 for females. The per capita income for the town was $17,116. About 26.5% of families and 30.1% of the population were below the poverty line, including 56.3% of those under age 18 and 12.5% of those age 65 or over.

== Education ==
- Princeton School - one of the last in the state of NC to be a "consolidated school". Now K-5th grades attend a new school built in 2008, while 6th through 12th grades remain at the original location.

== Works cited ==
- Powell, William S. (1976). The North Carolina Gazetteer: A Dictionary of Tar Heel Places. Chapel Hill: The University of North Carolina Press. ISBN 9780807812471.
