= Noah Edward Edgerton House =

Historic house in North Carolina, United States

- U.S. National Register of Historic Places
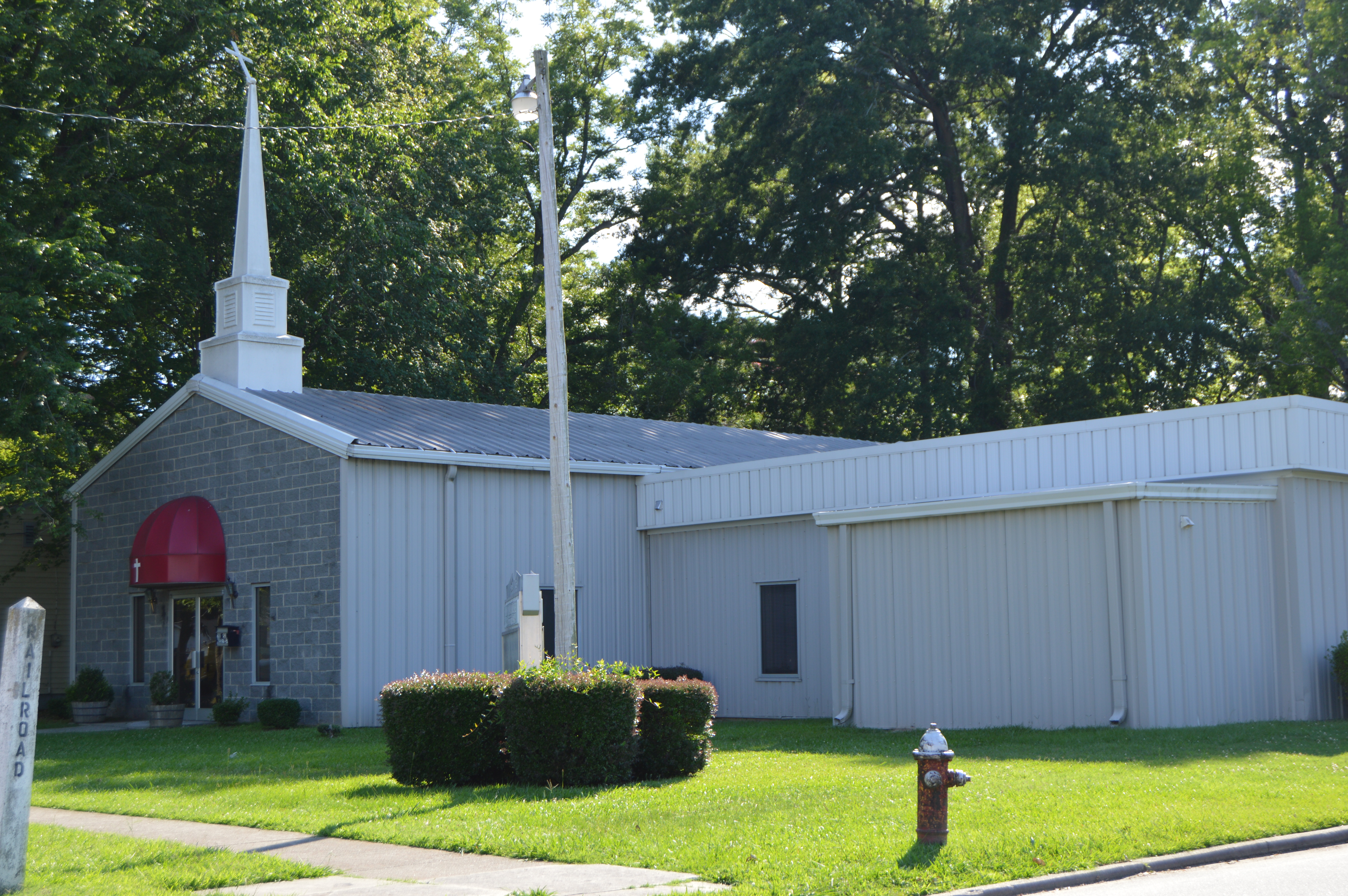
- Church on the site of the house

- Location within North Carolina Location within the United States
- Location: 301 W. Railroad St., Selma, North Carolina
- Coordinates: 35°32′10″N 78°17′49″W
- Area: 0.5 acres (0.20 ha)
- Built: 1896
- Architectural style: Queen Anne
- MPS: Selma, North Carolina MRA
- NRHP reference No.: 82003477
- Added to NRHP: June 24, 1982

Noah Edward Edgerton House is a historic home located at Selma, Johnston County, North Carolina. It was built in 1896, and is a two-story, three-bay, Queen Anne style frame dwelling. It features a three-story corner turret, asymmetrical massing, and an ornate, one-story wraparound porch.

It was listed on the National Register of Historic Places in 1982.
