= Everitt P. Stevens House =

Historic house in North Carolina, United States

- U.S. National Register of Historic Places
- Location within North Carolina Location within the United States
- Location: SR 1003, Selma, North Carolina
- Coordinates: 35°33′33″N 78°17′49″W
- Area: 1 acre (0.40 ha)
- Built: c. 1850
- Architectural style: Greek Revival
- MPS: Selma, North Carolina MRA
- NRHP reference No.: 82003481
- Added to NRHP: June 24, 1982

Everitt P. Stevens House is a historic plantation house located at Selma, Johnston County, North Carolina. It was built about 1850, and is a two-story, three-bay, vernacular Greek Revival style frame farmhouse. It has a single exterior brick end chimney and a rear shed addition added about 1940 and extended across the entire rear elevation about 1970. Also on the property are the contributing large barn and square tobacco barn, both built about 1900. After the Confederate Army defeat at the Battle of Bentonville (March 19–21, 1865) the army re-assembled around the grounds of the house where the last Grand Review of the army was held on April 6, 1865. In attendance at the review were Generals William J. Hardee, Joseph E. Johnston, and Governor Zebulon Baird Vance.

It was listed on the National Register of Historic Places in 1982.
