= Ellington-Ellis Farm =

Historic house in North Carolina, United States

- U.S. National Register of Historic Places
- Location within North Carolina Location within the United States
- Location: SR 1004, near Clayton, North Carolina
- Coordinates: 35°40′18″N 78°28′46″W
- Area: 57.8 acres (23.4 ha)
- Built: c. 1835, 1850s
- Architectural style: Greek Revival
- NRHP reference No.: 83001892
- Added to NRHP: July 21, 1983

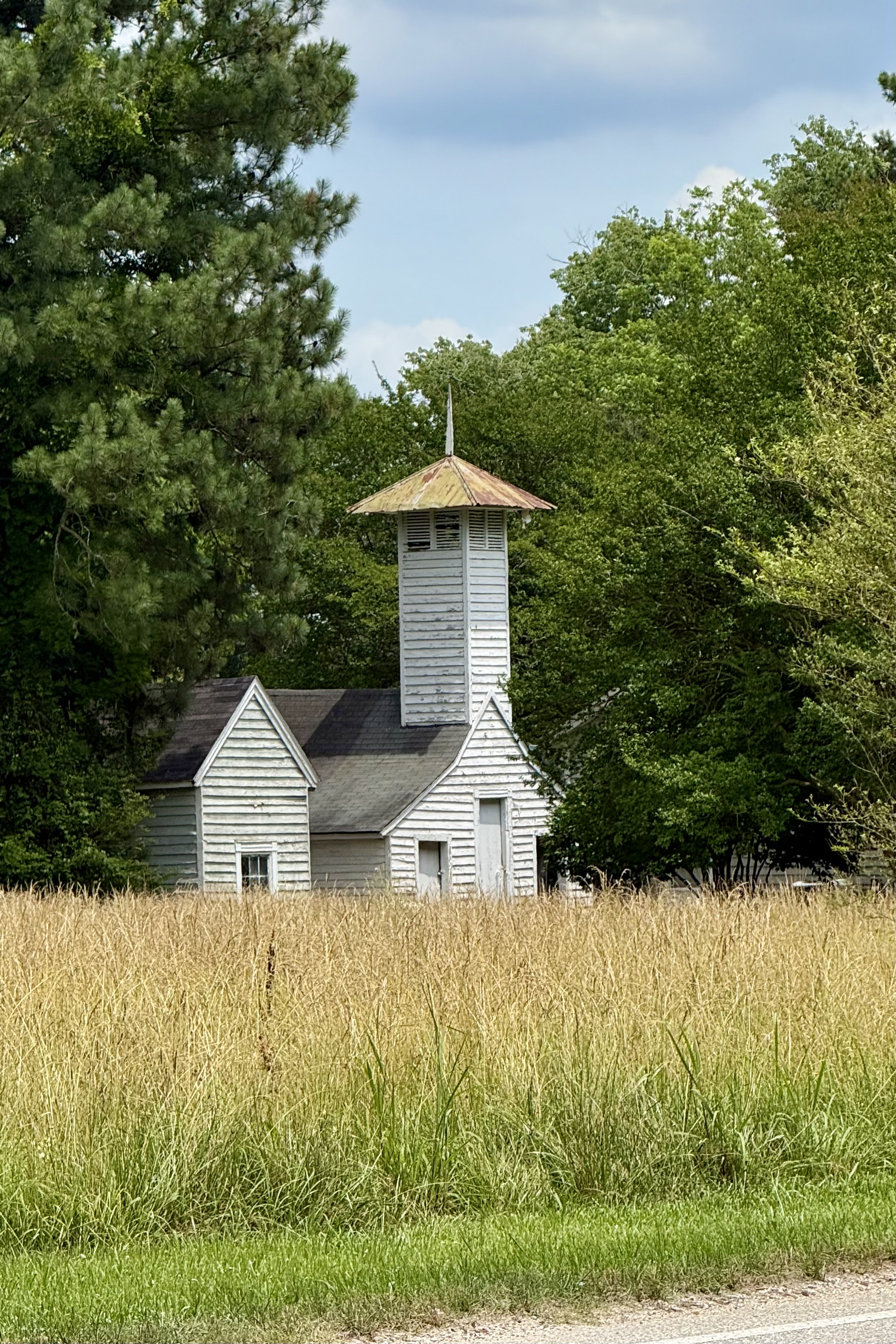
Ellington-Ellis Farm

Ellington-Ellis Farm is a historic home and farm complex located near Clayton, Johnston County, North Carolina. The house was built around 1835, and is a two-story, "T"-plan Greek Revival style heavy timber frame dwelling. It is sheathed in weatherboard, is flanked by exterior stone end chimneys, and has a low hip roof. It was remodeled in the 1850s that added a two-room kitchen/dining ell. Also on the property are the contributing smokehouse with a bell tower (1830s), a four-seat ladies' privy (1830s), and a playhouse (1850s).

It was listed on the National Register of Historic Places in 1983.
