= Smithfield Masonic Lodge =

- U.S. National Register of Historic Places
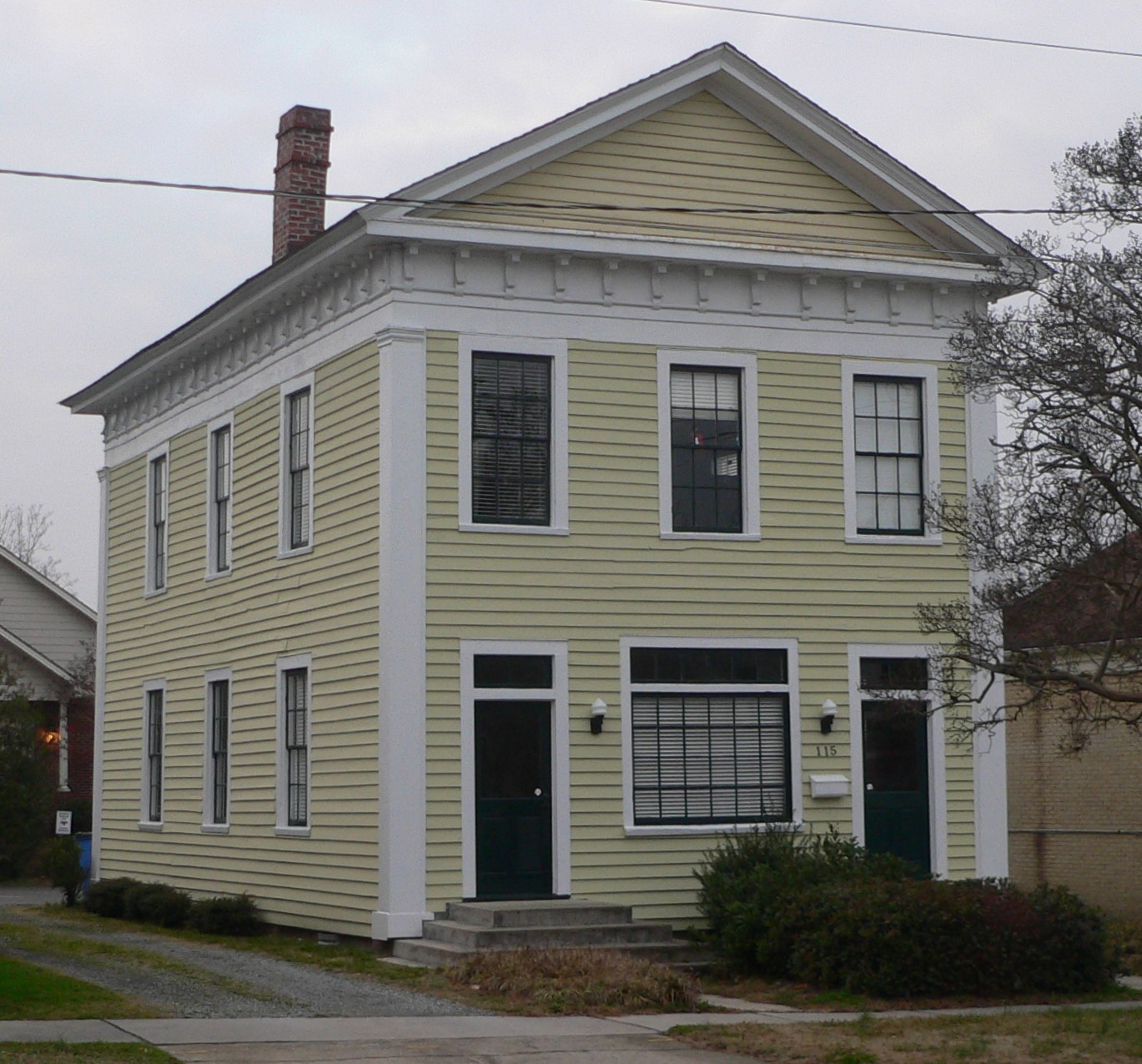
- Smithfield Masonic Lodge, December 2014

- Location within North Carolina Location within the United States
- Location: 115 N. Second St., Smithfield, North Carolina
- Coordinates: 35°30′51″N 78°20′51″W
- Area: 0.1 acres (0.040 ha)
- Built: c. 1854, 1915-1917
- Architectural style: Greek Revival
- NRHP reference No.: 07001012
- Added to NRHP: September 28, 2007

Smithfield Masonic Lodge, also known as the Brooks Building, is a historic Masonic Lodge located at Smithfield, Johnston County, North Carolina, United States It is believed to be built in about 1854, and had moved to its present location in 1915–1917. It is a two-story, three-bay, rectangular vernacular Greek Revival style frame building. It has a gable front temple form and is sheathed in plain weatherboard. Fellowship Lodge No. 84 occupied the building until the 1940s, and the Smithfield Woman's Club met in the building from 1917 through 1933. The building house Smithfield's first public library operated by the Smithfield Woman's Club.

It was listed on the National Register of Historic Places in 2007.
