= West Selma Historic District =

Historic district in North Carolina, United States

- U.S. National Register of Historic Places
- U.S. Historic district
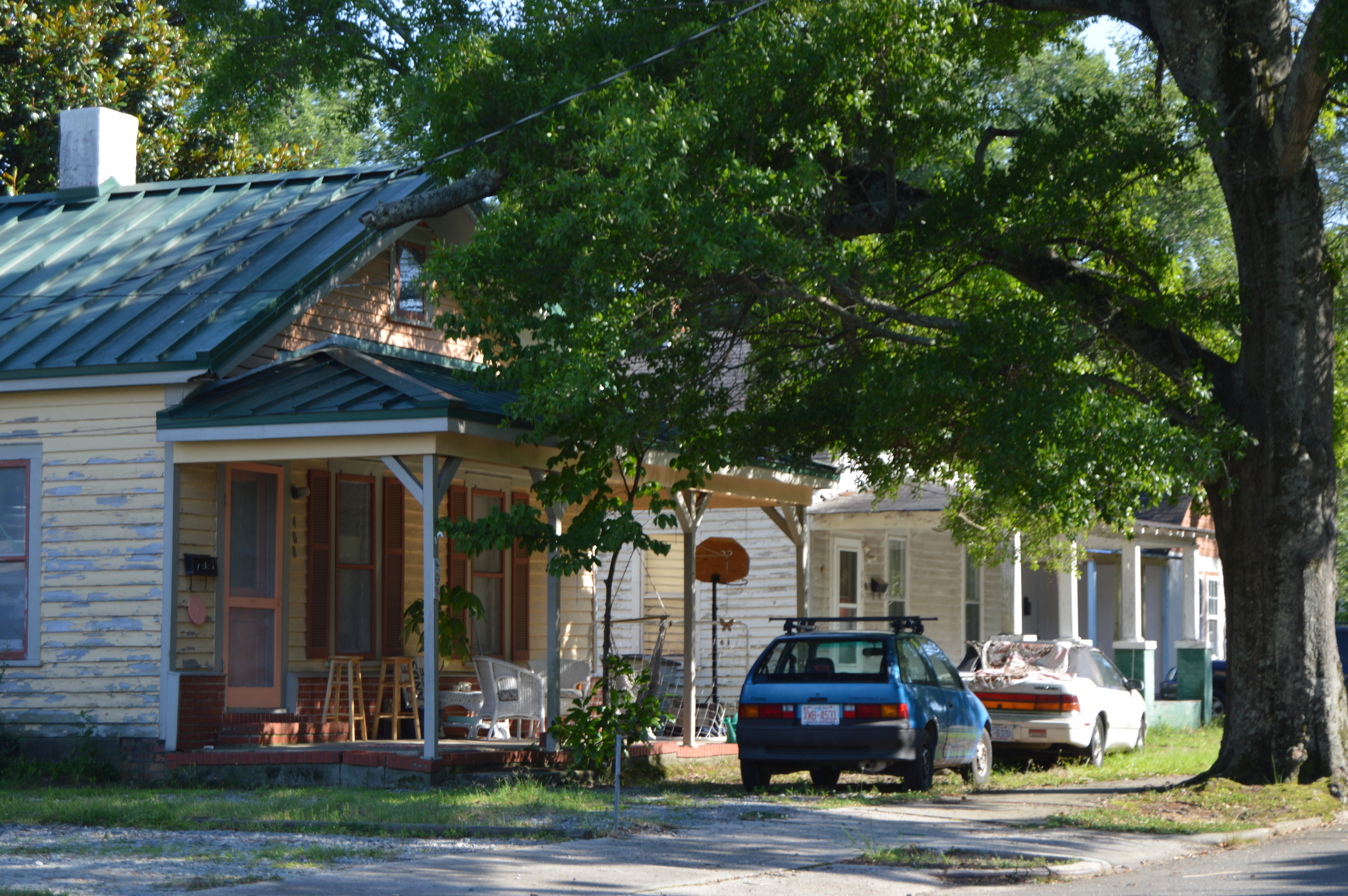
- Massey Street south of the school

- Location within North Carolina Location within the United States
- Location: Bounded by W. Railroad, N. Brevard, W. Richardson & N. Pollock Sts., Selma, North Carolina
- Coordinates: 35°32′20″N 78°17′09″W
- Area: 90 acres (36 ha)
- Architect: S.J. Atkinson, William Preston Rose
- Architectural style: Queen Anne, Gothic Revival, Moderne, Bungalow/Craftsman
- NRHP reference No.: 11000975
- Added to NRHP: December 30, 2011

West Selma Historic District is a national historic district located at Selma, Johnston County, North Carolina. It encompasses 217 contributing buildings, 1 contributing site, and 1 contributing structures in predominantly residential section of Selma. It includes notable examples of Queen Anne, Gothic Revival, Moderne, and Bungalow / American Craftsman style architecture and buildings dating from about 1880 to 1961. Located in the district is the separately listed Nowell-Mayerburg-Oliver House and William E. Smith House. Other notable buildings include the Edgerton Memorial Methodist Episcopal Church (1910, 1928, 1950), Abdalla House (c. 1940), Dr. Joshua W. Vick House (c. 1880, home of one of the developers of Vick's Vapor Rub), Stella and William H. Etheridge House (also known as "Turnwood," 1897), Dr. R. Marvin Blackmon House, Samuel P. Wood House (1935), Janie and C. E. Kornegay House (1923), Selma Presbyterian Church (c. 1912, 1942), St. Gabriel's Episcopal Church/Vernon Wiggs House (c. 1900, 1946), and Pepsi Bottling Company (c. 1935).

It was listed on the National Register of Historic Places in 2011.
