= Clayton Elementary School and Auditorium =

Historic school building in North Carolina, United States

- Clayton Graded School and Clayton Grammar School-Municipal Auditorium
- U.S. National Register of Historic Places
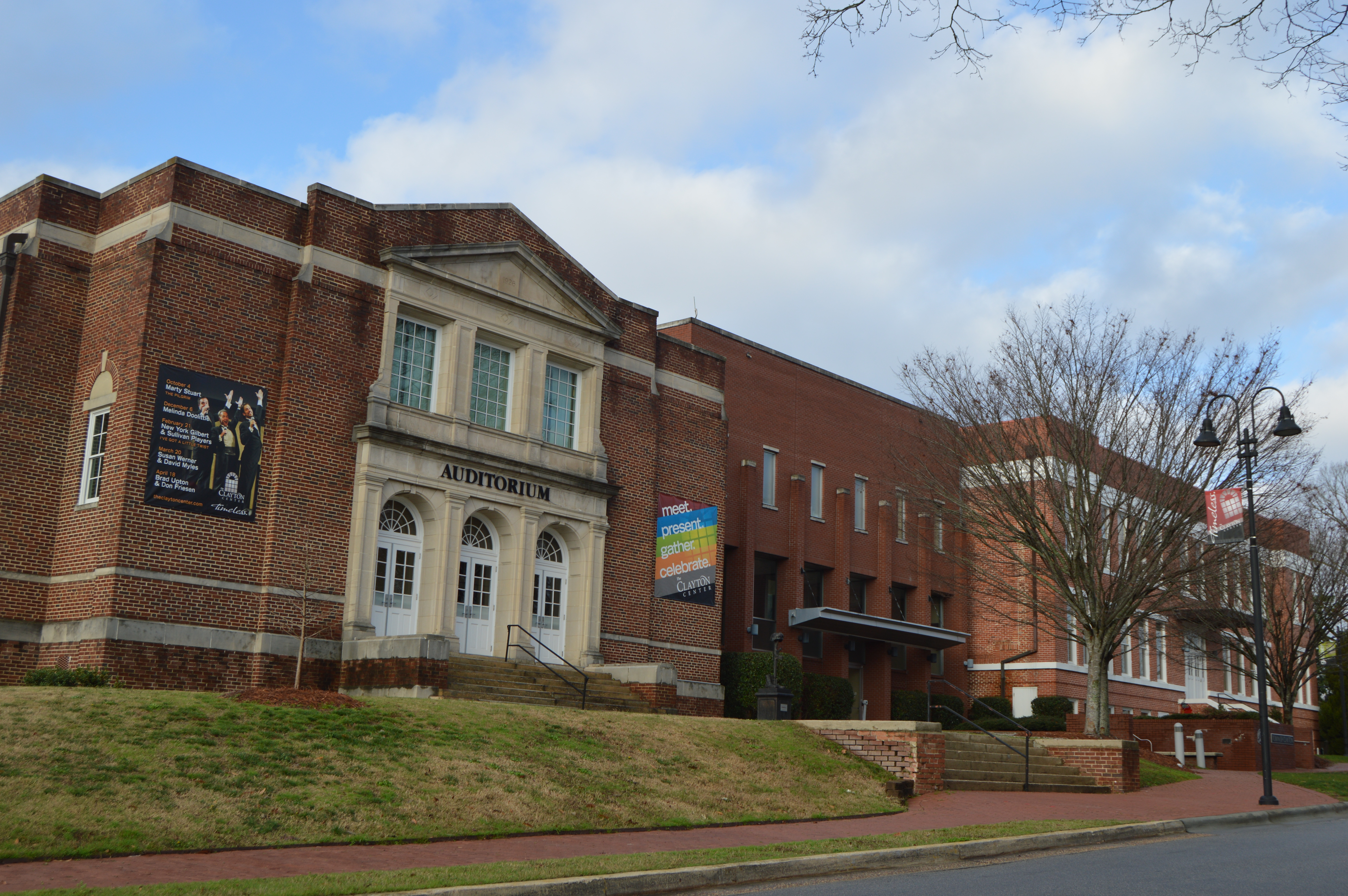
- Northern side of the complex

- Location within North Carolina Location within the United States
- Location: 101 and 111 2nd St., Clayton, North Carolina
- Coordinates: 35°39′8″N 78°27′38″W
- Area: 2.3 acres (0.93 ha)
- Built: 1915, 1926
- Architect: Charles Christian Hook
- Architectural style: Classical Revival
- NRHP reference No.: 01001133
- Added to NRHP: October 20, 2001

The Clayton Elementary School and Auditorium are a historic school complex located at Clayton, Johnston County, North Carolina. The elementary school was built in 1915, and is a two-story, rectangular brick building on a raised basement with a projecting one-story rear gymnasium. The municipal auditorium was designed by architect Charles C. Hook and built in 1926. It consists of a two-story, gable front auditorium on the front of the building, with a three-story classroom section at the rear. The classroom block contains 18 classrooms. The school closed in 1997.

It was listed on the National Register of Historic Places in 2001.
