= Hood-Strickland House =

Historic house in North Carolina, United States

- U.S. National Register of Historic Places
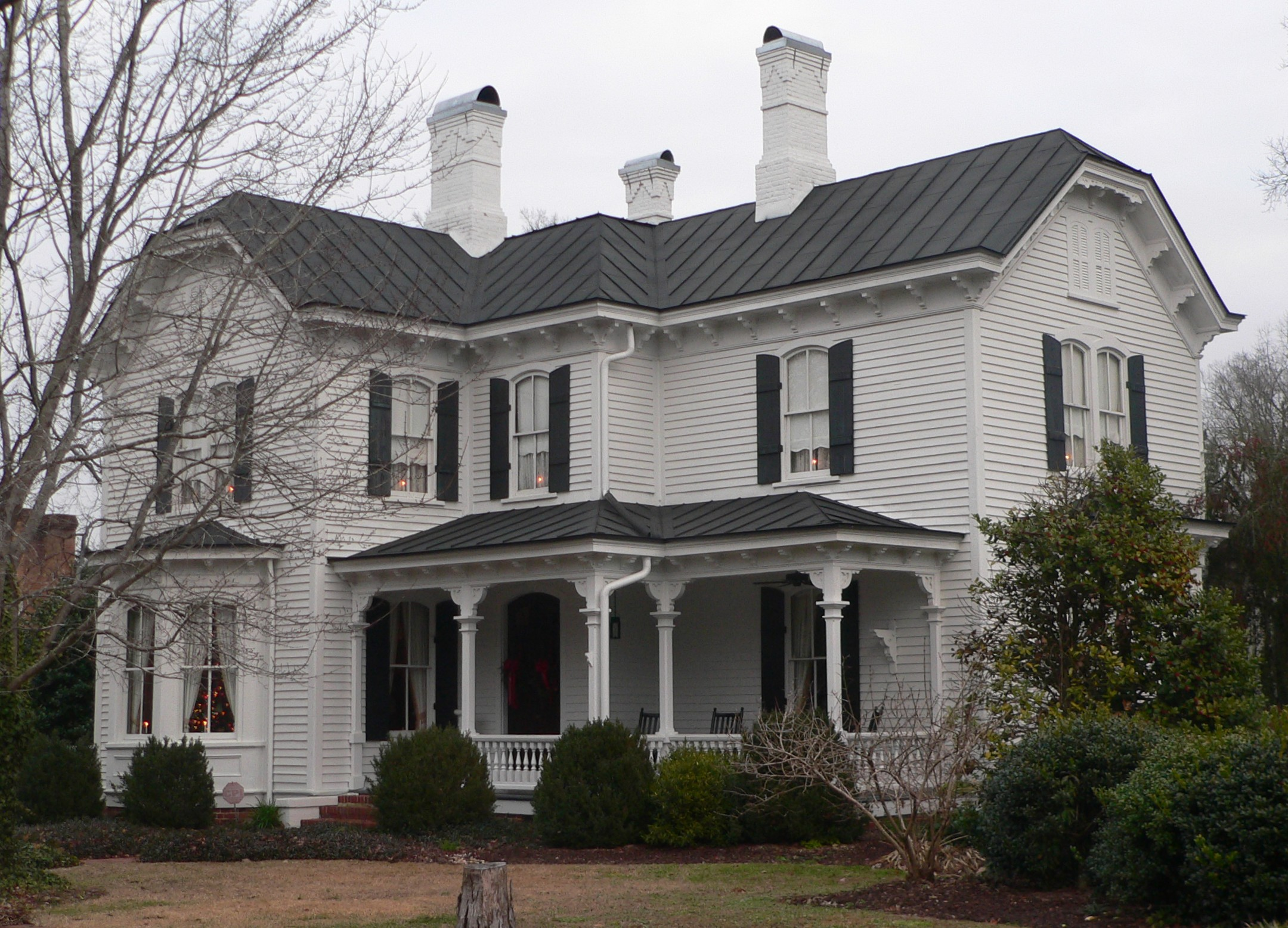
- Hood-Strickland House, December 2014

- Location within North Carolina Location within the United States
- Location: 415 S. 4th St., Smithfield, North Carolina
- Coordinates: 35°30′21″N 78°20′51″W
- Area: 0.3 acres (0.12 ha)
- Built: 1887-1889
- Architect: Byrd, C.S.
- Architectural style: Italianate
- NRHP reference No.: 90001310
- Added to NRHP: August 23, 1990

Hood-Strickland House, also known as the T. R. Hood House, is a historic home located at Smithfield, Johnston County, North Carolina. It was built between 1887 and 1889, and is a two-story, three-bay, T-shaped Italianate style frame dwelling. It has a tall clipped gable roof, bracketed cornice, three sided bays, tall corbelled chimneys, segmental arched windows, and a decorative porch.

It was listed on the National Register of Historic Places in 1990.
