= Sanders Creek (Iowa) =

Stream in Iowa, U.S.

Coordinates: 41°42′08″N 91°31′45″W

Sanders Creek is a stream in the U.S. state of Iowa. It is a tributary to Rapid Creek.

Sanders Creek was named after Cyrus Sanders, a pioneer settler.
