= Downtown Selma Historic District =

Historic district in North Carolina, United States

- U.S. National Register of Historic Places
- U.S. Historic district
- Location within North Carolina Location within the United States
- Location: Includes portions of both sides of N. and S. Raiford, E. & W. Anderson, E. and W. Waddell, and E. and W. Railroad Sts, and W Web, Selma, North Carolina
- Coordinates: 35°32′12″N 78°17′04″W
- Area: 12 acres (4.9 ha)
- Architectural style: Commercial Style, Classical Revival, Colonial Revival, Art Moderne, Art Deco, Gothic Revival
- NRHP reference No.: 10000601
- Added to NRHP: August 30, 2010

Downtown Selma Historic District is a national historic district located at Selma, Johnston County, North Carolina. It encompasses 59 contributing buildings and 1 contributing structure in the central business district of Selma. It includes notable examples of Classical Revival, Colonial Revival, Art Moderne, Art Deco, and Gothic Revival style architecture and buildings dating from about 1875 to 1960. Notable buildings include the Bank of Selma/American Telephone and Telegraph Exchange Building (1912; 1985), Economy Furniture (c. 1920), John A. Mitchener Building (1925), The Rudy Theater (c. 1940; c. 1970), The Hardware Store (c. 1910), Bank of Selma (c. 1910), Selma Baptist Church (1908; 1948), and Selma Manufacturing Company/Selma Furniture Store and Opera House (1902).

It was listed on the National Register of Historic Places in 2010.
