= Clayton Banking Company Building =

Historic building in North Carolina, US

- U.S. National Register of Historic Places
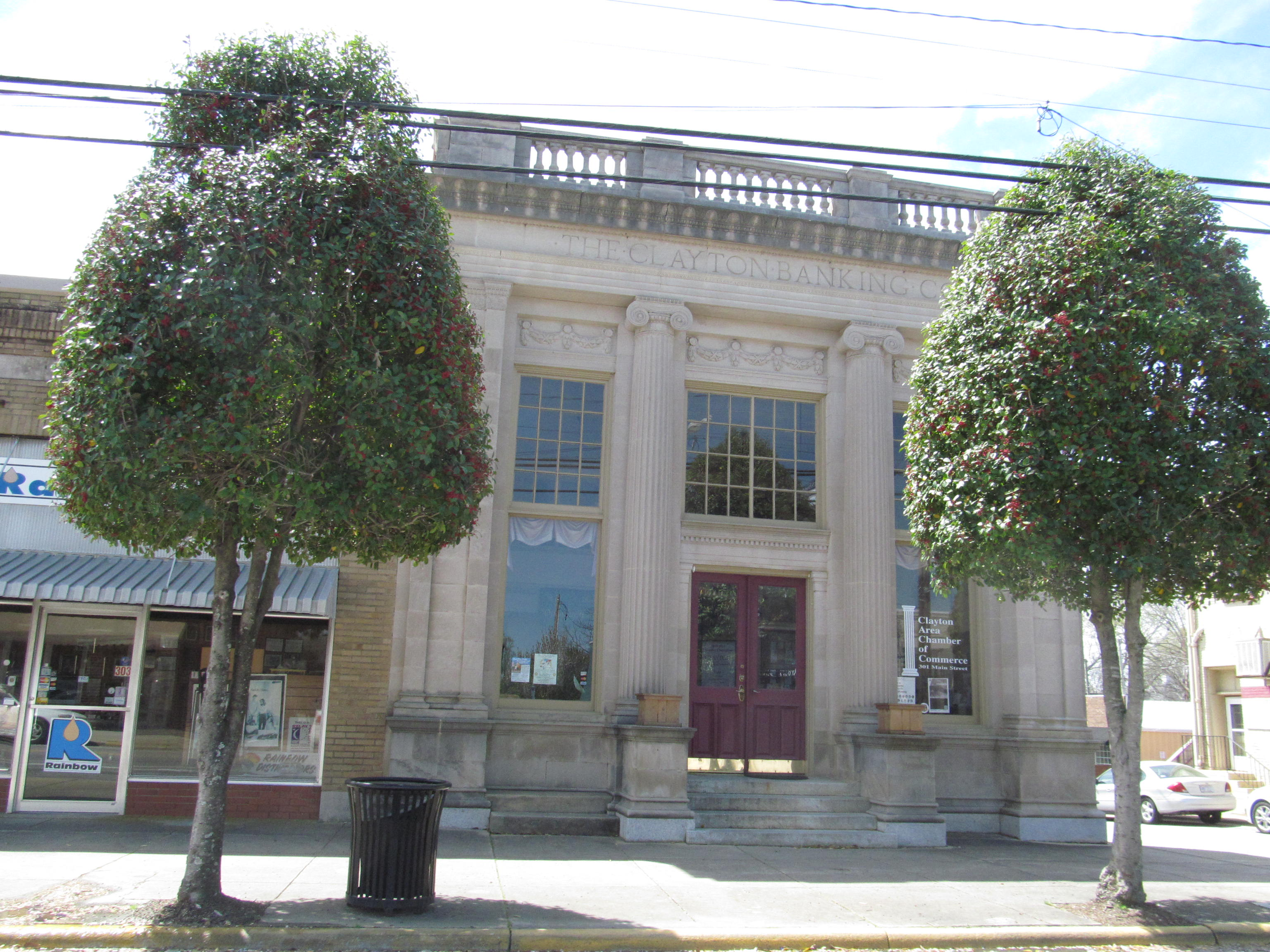
- Clayton Banking Company Building, April 2014

- Location within North Carolina Location within the United States
- Location: 301 E. Main St., Clayton, North Carolina
- Coordinates: 35°38′59″N 78°27′29″W
- Area: less than one acre
- Built: 1919-1920
- Architectural style: Beaux Arts
- NRHP reference No.: 96001444
- Added to NRHP: December 6, 1996

Clayton Banking Company Building is a historic bank building located at Clayton, Johnston County, North Carolina. It was built in 1919–1920, and is a two-story rectangular brick block faced with Indiana limestone in the Beaux-Arts style. The front facade includes a pair of three-quarter Ionic order columns "in antis" framing the double front doors. The building houses the Clayton Chamber of Commerce.

It was listed on the National Register of Historic Places in 1996.
