= Watson-Sanders House =

Historic house in North Carolina, United States

- U.S. National Register of Historic Places
- Location within North Carolina Location within the United States
- Location: 2810 Brogden Rd., Smithfield, North Carolina
- Coordinates: 35°28′07″N 78°19′34″W
- Area: 12 acres (4.9 ha)
- Built: c. 1820, c. 1854
- Architectural style: I-house, Greek Revival
- NRHP reference No.: 01000015
- Added to NRHP: January 26, 2001

Watson-Sanders House

Watson-Sanders House is a historic home located near Smithfield, Johnston County, North Carolina. It was built about 1820, and is a two-story, three-bay, frame I-house dwelling. It has a double engaged front piazza, an original rear shed piazza. The interior was remodeled in the Greek Revival style, when the house was moved to its present site in 1854.

It was listed on the National Register of Historic Places in 2001.
