= Selma, North Carolina =

- Town
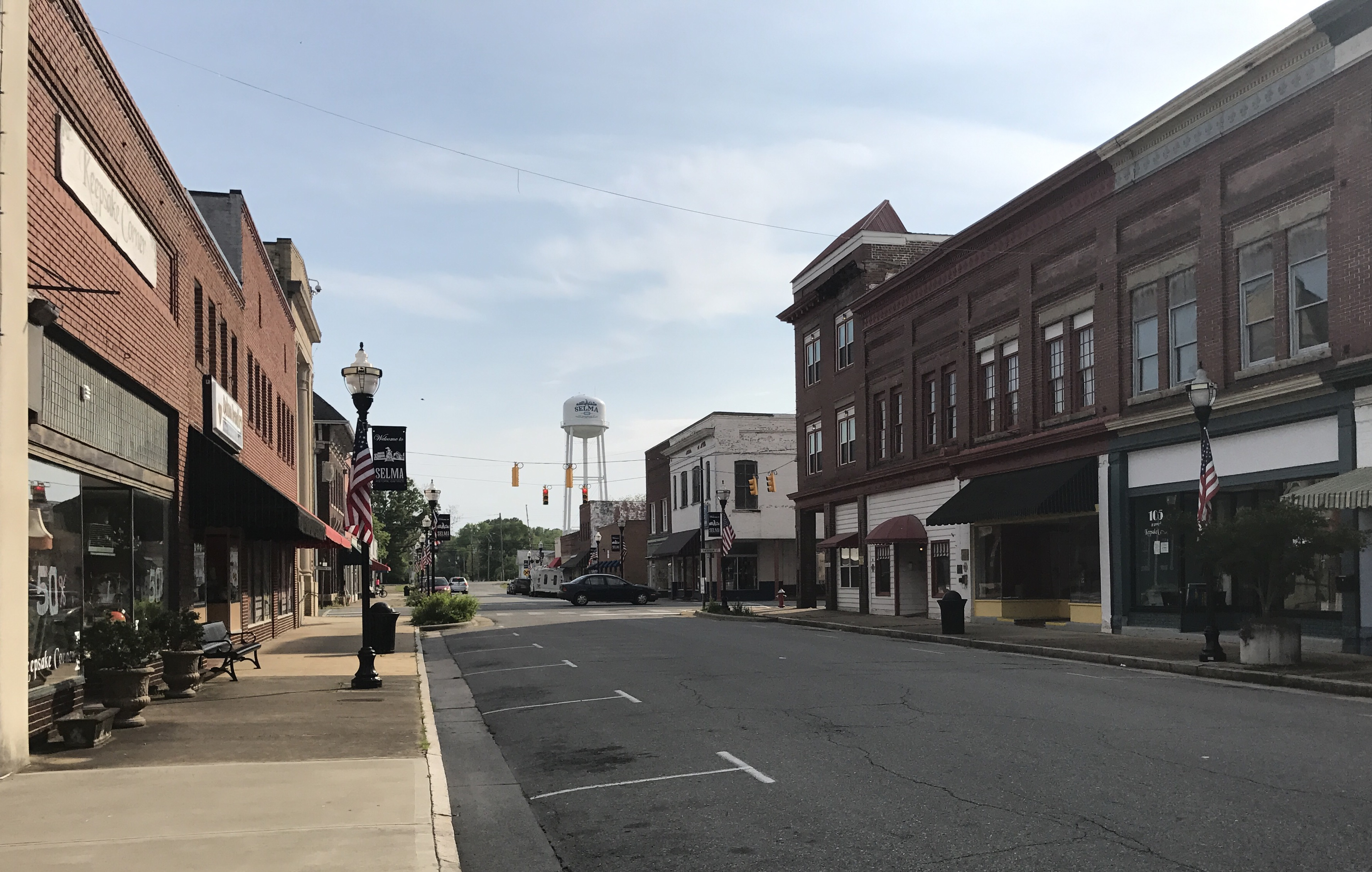
- Downtown Selma

- Flag Seal Logo
- Motto: "The Crossroads of Tradition and Innovation"
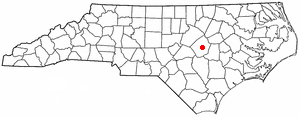
- Location of Selma, North Carolina
- Coordinates: 35°32′27″N 78°17′35″W
- Country: United States
- State: North Carolina
- County: Johnston
- Chartered: February 11, 1873
- Named for: Selma, Alabama

Government
  - Type: Council–manager
  - Mayor: Byron McAllister

Area
  - Total: 5.41 sq mi (14.00 km^{2})
  - Land: 5.41 sq mi (14.00 km^{2})
  - Water: 0 sq mi (0.00 km^{2})
- Elevation: 164 ft (50 m)

Population (2020)
  - Total: 6,317
  - Density: 1,168.9/sq mi (451.33/km^{2})
- Time zone: UTC-5 (Eastern (EST))
  - Summer (DST): UTC-4 (EDT)
- ZIP code: 27576
- Area code: 919
- FIPS code: 37-60320
- GNIS feature ID: 2407310
- Website: www.selma-nc.com

Selma is a town in Johnston County, North Carolina, United States. As of the 2020 census, Selma had a population of 6,317. Selma is part of the Raleigh-Durham-Cary combined statistical area. The area has a population over 1.7 million residents, though the town of Selma is able to maintain its rural character. The Everitt P. Stevens House, located in Selma, was the site of the last Grand Review of the Confederate Army held on April 6, 1865, after its defeat at the Battle of Bentonville.

== History ==
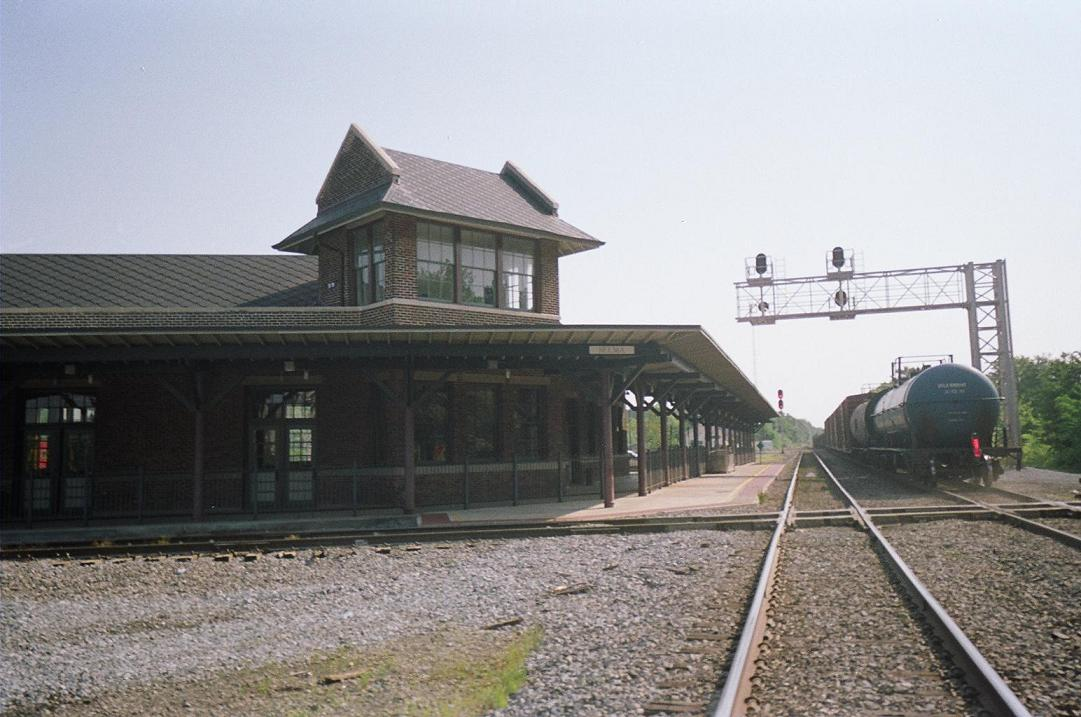
A CSX freight train passes the Selma Union Depot.

On May 1, 1867, lots were sold around a newly established station on the North Carolina Railroad. From those lots, the town was built and considered a railroad town for many decades. Selma was officially chartered as a town on February 11, 1873. The town recently renovated its 1924 passenger depot, which has Amtrak service. The town is also home to the Mitchener Station, which was built in 1855, and is thought to be the oldest surviving train station in North Carolina. After Interstate 95 was built in the late 1950s, the town experienced growth due to its location next to the interstate. Today, many hotels and restaurants are located in the area due to the traffic from I-95.

The Downtown Selma Historic District, Noah Edward Edgerton House, Richard B. Harrison School, Nowell-Mayerburg-Oliver House, William E. Smith House, Everitt P. Stevens House, Selma Union Depot, and West Selma Historic District are listed on the National Register of Historic Places.

== Geography ==
Selma is located in central Johnston County and is bordered to the southwest by Smithfield, the county seat, and to the northwest by Wilson's Mills.

According to the United States Census Bureau, the town of Selma has a total area of 4.9 square miles (12.6 km^{2}), all land.

== Demographics ==
Historical population
Census	Pop.	Note	%±
1880	256		—
1890	527		105.9%
1900	816		54.8%
1910	1,331		63.1%
1920	1,601		20.3%
1930	1,857		16.0%
1940	2,007		8.1%
1950	2,639		31.5%
1960	3,102		17.5%
1970	4,356		40.4%
1980	4,762		9.3%
1990	4,600		−3.4%
2000	5,914		28.6%
2010	6,073		2.7%
2020	6,317		4.0%
2025 (est.)	7,406	▲	17.2%
U.S. Decennial Census

=== 2020 census ===
As of the 2020 census, Selma had a population of 6,317. The median age was 33.3 years. 30.0% of residents were under the age of 18 and 13.6% of residents were 65 years of age or older. For every 100 females there were 92.2 males, and for every 100 females age 18 and over there were 86.1 males age 18 and over.

96.1% of residents lived in urban areas, while 3.9% lived in rural areas.

There were 2,359 households in Selma, of which 40.4% had children under the age of 18 living in them. Of all households, 31.4% were married-couple households, 21.7% were households with a male householder and no spouse or partner present, and 40.1% were households with a female householder and no spouse or partner present. About 29.7% of all households were made up of individuals and 13.6% had someone living alone who was 65 years of age or older.

There were 2,643 housing units, of which 10.7% were vacant. The homeowner vacancy rate was 3.2% and the rental vacancy rate was 6.2%.

Racial composition as of the 2020 census
Race	Number	Percent
White	1,777	28.1%
Black or African American	2,318	36.7%
American Indian and Alaska Native	73	1.2%
Asian	34	0.5%
Native Hawaiian and Other Pacific Islander	0	0.0%
Some other race	1,351	21.4%
Two or more races	764	12.1%
Hispanic or Latino (of any race)	2,381	37.7%

=== 2000 census ===
As of the 2000 census, 5,914 people, 2,254 households, and 1,480 families were residing in the town. The population density was 1,830.6 inhabitants per square mile (706.8/km^{2}). The 2,515 housing units had an average density of 778.5 per square mile (300.6/km^{2}). The racial makeup of the town was 47.09% White, 40.33% African American, 0.57% Native American, 0.19% Asian, 0.08% Pacific Islander, 9.89% from other races, and 1.84% from two or more races. Hispanics or Latinos of any race were 19.02% of the population.

Of the 2,254 households, 31.9% had children under 18 living with them, 38.1% were married couples living together, 21.3% had a female householder with no husband present, and 34.3% were not families. About 28.7% of all households were made up of individuals, and 11.8% had someone living alone who was 65 or older. The average household size was 2.61 and the average family size was 3.17.

In the town, the age distribution was 27.9% under 18, 11.6% from 18 to 24, 28.6% from 25 to 44, 20.4% from 45 to 64, and 11.5% who were 65 or older. The median age was 31 years. For every 100 females, there were 94.2 males. For every 100 females 18 and over, there were 88.8 males.

The median income for a household in the town was $23,856 and for a family was $32,430. Males had a median income of $26,886 versus $21,453 for females. The per capita income for the town was $12,101. About 23.1% of families and 30.0% of the population were below the poverty line, including 45.9% of those under 18 and 22.1% of those 65 or over.

=== Religion ===
About 36% of people in Selma are affiliated with a religion. The predominant religion in Selma is Christianity, with the largest numbers of adherents being Baptist (15.64%) and Methodist (6.02%). Others include Pentecostal (4.02%), Roman Catholic (2.52%), and Presbyterian (1.46%).

== Law and government ==
Selma operates under a council-manager government. The town council consists of the mayor and four council members, who are elected at-large.

== Transportation ==
=== Air ===
Johnston County Airport is a general aviation airport located around 7 miles west of Selma, in Smithfield.

Raleigh-Durham International Airport is the region's primary airport, located roughly 40 miles northwest of Selma, between Raleigh and Durham.

=== Designated routes and highways ===
- Interstate Highway
  - Future I-42
  - I-95
- U.S. Highways:
  - US 70
  - US 301 (named Pollock Street)
- North Carolina Highways:
  - NC 39
  - NC 96

Interstate 95 runs along the southern edge of the town, with access from Exit 97 (U.S. Route 70) and Exit 98 (Pine Level–Selma Road). I-95 leads northeast 44 miles (71 km) to Rocky Mount and southwest 51 miles (82 km) to Fayetteville. U.S. Route 301 (Pollock Street) runs through the center of Selma, leading northeast 25 miles (40 km) to Wilson and southwest 4 miles (6 km) to the center of Smithfield. US 70 runs along the southwestern edge of Selma, leading northwest 31 miles (50 km) to Raleigh and southeast 21 miles (34 km) to Goldsboro. North Carolina Highway 96 leads north from the center of Selma 21 miles (34 km) to Zebulon.

=== Passenger rail service ===
Amtrak's Palmetto and Carolinian passenger trains stop at the historic Selma Union Depot. They offer service to Charlotte, New York City Savannah, and intermediate points.

=== Commercial rail service ===
- CSX Transportation
- Norfolk Southern Railway

=== Public transit ===
The Johnston County Area Transit System is a coordinated transit system that provides transportation services in Selma and throughout Johnston County.

== Education ==
Selma is home to two schools within the Johnston County School District:

- Selma Elementary School
- Selma Middle School

Mitchner University Academy is a private, nontraditional school offering kindergarten to grade-12 education.

== Culture ==
=== Museums ===
- Historic Union Station
- Max G. Creech Selma Historical Museum

== Media ==
=== Television ===
Selma is part of the Raleigh-Durham-Fayetteville designated market area. WNGT-CD has broadcast facilities in the city.

=== Newspapers ===
Several newspapers and periodicals serve the city, including:

- The News & Observer, daily
- Johnstonian News, weekly

=== Radio stations ===
Selma is part of the Raleigh-Durham Arbitron radio market. WTSB (1090 AM) transmits from the city.

== Notable people ==
- Myrtle Cagle, pilot and member of Mercury 13 female astronaut program
- Seby B. Jones, former mayor of Raleigh, North Carolina
- Drique London (born Madrique Sanders), rapper and hip-hop artist
- Lunsford Richardson, founder of the Vick Chemical Company, maker of cold remedies such as Vicks Cough Drops
