= Sanders-Hairr House =

Historic house in North Carolina, United States

- U.S. National Register of Historic Places
- Location within North Carolina Location within the United States
- Location: South of Clayton on SR 1525, near Clayton, North Carolina
- Coordinates: 35°36′46″N 78°32′5″W
- Area: 7 acres (2.8 ha)
- Built: c. 1787
- Architectural style: Georgian, Federal
- NRHP reference No.: 71000597
- Added to NRHP: May 6, 1971

Sanders-Hairr House is a historic home located near Clayton, Johnston County, North Carolina. It was built about 1787, and is a two-story, five-bay, transitional Georgian / Federal style frame dwelling. It is sheathed in weatherboard, is flanked by massive double-shouldered exterior end chimneys, and has a full-width shed roofed one-story front porch.

It was listed on the National Register of Historic Places in 1971.
