= North Smithfield Historic District =

Historic district in North Carolina, United States

- U.S. National Register of Historic Places
- U.S. Historic district
- Location within North Carolina Location within the United States
- Location: Roughly bounded by Market, Front, North, and Seventh Sts., Smithfield, North Carolina
- Coordinates: 35°30′49″N 78°20′38″W
- Area: 50 acres (20 ha)
- Built: 1888
- Architect: Stout, John C.
- Architectural style: Queen Anne, Italianate, et.al.
- NRHP reference No.: 00000550
- Added to NRHP: May 26, 2000

North Smithfield Historic District is a national historic district located at Smithfield, Johnston County, North Carolina. It encompasses 120 contributing buildings, 3 contributing sites, and 1 contributing structure in a predominantly residential section of Smithfield. It includes notable examples of Italianate and Queen Anne style architecture and buildings dating from about the 1850s through the 1940s. Notable buildings include the Lunceford-Narron House (c. 1885), Massey-Wilson House (c. 1885), Stevens-Mattox House (c. 1910), Allred-Pou-Wellons-McGowan House (c. 1905), (former) Smithfield Water Power Plant (c. 1913), and St Ann's Catholic Church (1935).

It was listed on the National Register of Historic Places in 2000.
