= MP Materials =

American Rare Earth materials company

MP Materials Corp.
- Type: Public
- Traded as: NYSE: MP; S&P 400 component
- Industry: Materials; Mining
- Founded: 2017; 9 years ago
- Founders: James Litinsky; Michael Rosenthal
- Headquarters: Las Vegas, Nevada, U.S.
- Area served: Worldwide
- Key people: James Litinsky (Executive Chairman & CEO); Michael Rosenthal (COO)
- Products: Rare earth oxides, Rare-earth metals, and neodymium magnets
- Production output: 38,500 tonnes (2020)
- Revenue: ▲US$224 million (2025)
- Net income: ▼ −US$85.9 million (2025)
- Owner: JHL Capital Group, QVT Financial LP, James Litinsky, Shenghe Resources
- Number of employees: 681 (2024)
- Website: mpmaterials.com

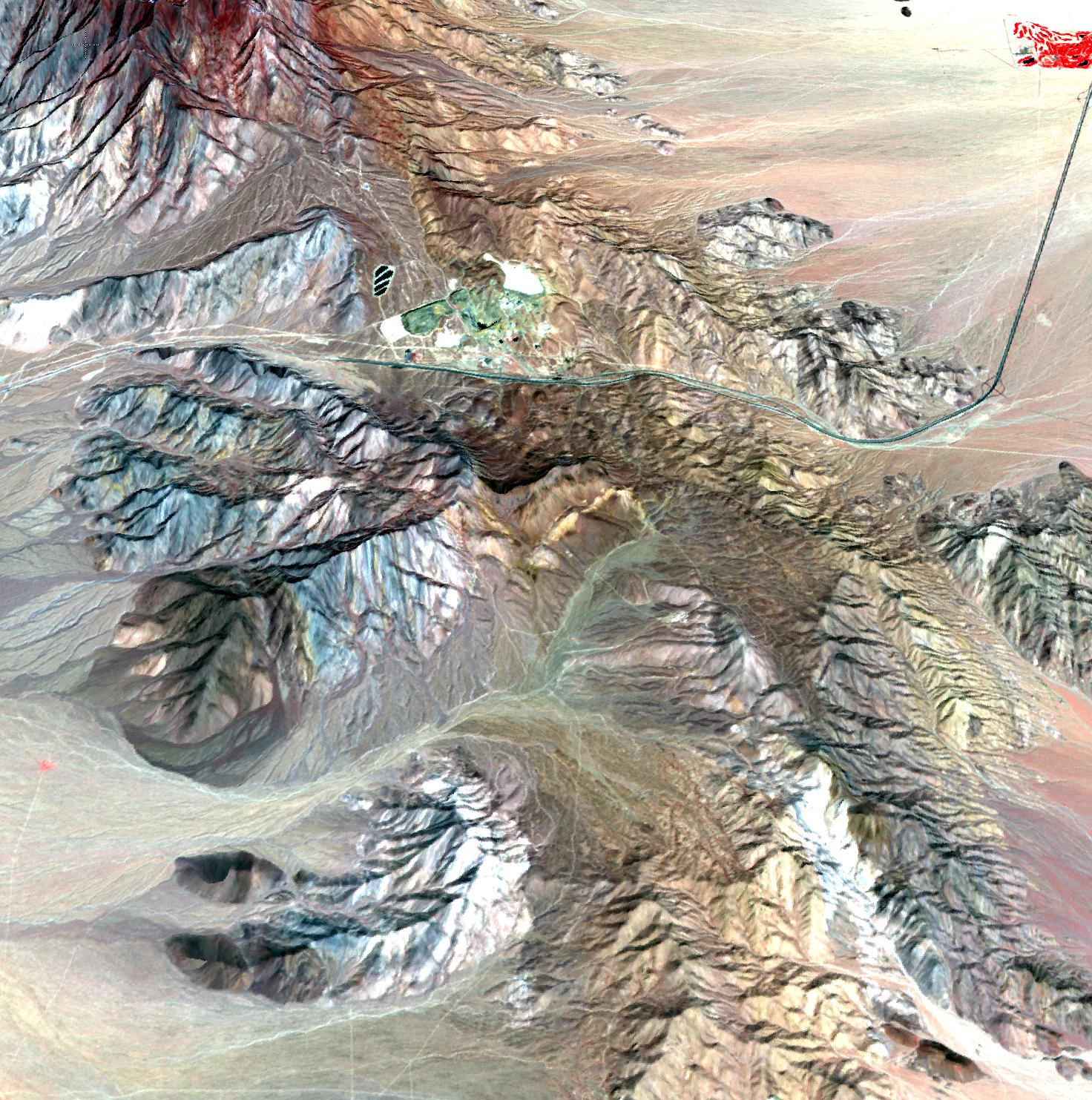
Mountain Pass mine, aerial view

MP Materials Corp. is an American rare-earth materials company headquartered in Las Vegas, Nevada. MP Materials owns and operates the Mountain Pass mine, the only operating rare earth mine and processing facility in the United States. MP Materials focuses its production on neodymium-praseodymium (NdPr), a rare-earth material used in high-strength permanent magnets that power the traction motors found in electric vehicles, robotics, wind turbines, drones, and other advanced motion technologies. MP Materials is listed on the New York Stock Exchange under the ticker symbol "MP". As of December 2021, JHL Capital Group, QVT Financial and CEO James Litinsky were the company's three largest shareholders, with about 7.7% of the company owned by Shenghe Resources, a Chinese company partly owned by the country's Ministry of Natural Resources. In July 2025, the United States Department of Defense announced a deal that would make it the largest shareholder of MP Materials.

== History ==
In 2015, Molycorp, the previous owners of the Mountain Pass mine, filed for bankruptcy. At the time, it was the only US producer of rare-earth elements. While in bankruptcy, Secure Natural Resources (SNR), a company owned by Molycorp's creditors, including JHL Capital Group, gained control of the mine's mineral rights. In June 2017, the Mountain Pass mine was purchased at auction for $20.5 million by a new entity called MP Mine Operations LLC (MPMO). MPMO was a consortium formed principally by JHL Capital Group, a Chicago-based investment firm led by James Litinsky, along with QVT Financial LP and Shenghe Resources. Shenghe Resources held a minority, non-voting interest. At the time, Mountain Pass was in a state of "care and maintenance" and had only eight employees according to Litinsky.

Following the asset acquisitions and formation of the entities that became MP Materials, the company restarted operations at Mountain Pass. On July 15, 2020, the company announced a reverse takeover whereby MPMO and SNR would be merged with Fortress Value Acquisition Corporation to become a public company under the name MP Materials Corp. The transaction, which closed on November 17, 2020, raised $545 million. On November 18, 2020, MP Materials began trading on the New York Stock Exchange under the symbol "MP".

In December 2021, MP Materials signed a long-term agreement with General Motors to provide neodymium-iron-boron magnets for use in GM's electric-vehicle motors. As part of the contract, MP Materials also agreed to provide alloy and finished magnets to GM for its electric vehicles and to open a new factory located in Fort Worth, Texas, to produce the magnets.

As of December 2021, JHL Capital Group, QVT Financial, and CEO James Litinsky were the company's three largest shareholders, and about 7.7% of the company was owned by Shenghe Resources. Apart from institutions, other investors own 18%.

As of 2024, CEO James Litinsky was the company's largest shareholder. Other large shareholders include Vanguard, Shenghe Resources, BlackRock, and Hancock Prospecting.

In April 2024, Hancock Prospecting, an Australian mining firm owned by Gina Rinehart, disclosed a 5.3% stake in MP Materials, comprising 8.8 million shares, and a 5.8% stake in Lynas.

In January 2025, MP Materials announced that their Independence facility in Fort Worth, Texas, has commenced neodymium and praseodymium (NdPr) metal production. According to the company, NdFeB magnets will be the first rare-earth products to be refined in the United States, which has long depended on foreign sources, particularly China.

In April 2025, Shenghe Resources stated that its US affiliate, MP Materials, had stopped shipping minerals for processing due to the tariffs in the second Trump administration.

In May 2025, the Maʽaden (a Saudi Arabian mining company) and MP Materials entered into an agreement to establish a rare-earth supply chain within Saudi Arabia. The development took place during President Trump's visit to the Middle East.

On July 15, 2025, Apple announced a $500 million investment in MP Materials, following the Trump administration's efforts to reduce US reliance on China for rare earth elements. The announcement came a few days after the US Department of Defense agreed to a multibillion-dollar investment to build a new rare-earth-magnet facility called the "10X Facility."

=== Mountain Pass mine ===
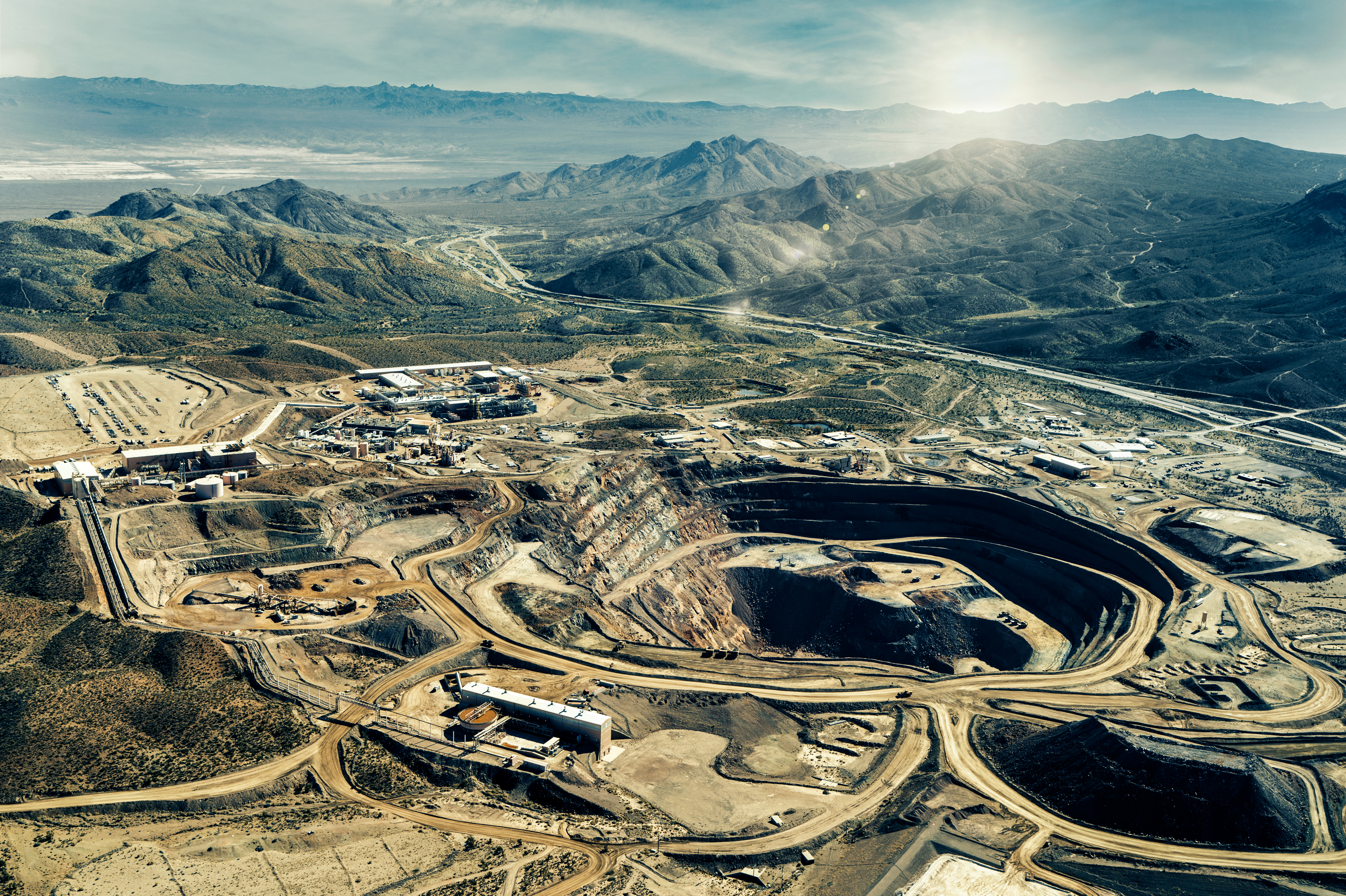
Mountain Pass mine

Discovered in 1949 in San Bernardino County, California, Mountain Pass mine consists of a bastnäsite ore-body with significant concentrations of rare earth elements. The mine once supplied most of the world's rare-earth elements. Mountain Pass is the only operational rare-earth mining and processing facility in the United States. The expected Mountain Pass mine life is approximately 24 years.

MP Materials produced 28,000 tonnes of rare-earth oxide equivalent from Mountain Pass in 2019, and 38,500 tonnes in 2020, or more than 15% of global production. As of late 2020, Shenghe Resources was the sole purchaser of MP Material's rare-earth concentrate.

As of 2023, MP Materials had a three-stage plan for scaling its operations:

- Stage I: Production of rare-earth concentrate
- Stage II: Production of separated and refined rare earths
- Stage III: Production of rare-earth metals, alloys, and permanent magnets

As of 2023, stages II and III were underway and the company had begun production of refined rare earths. MP Materials signed a supply-chain agreement with Japanese trading house Sumitomo Corporation in 2023.

== US government contracts ==
In July 2020, the United States Department of Defense issued a preliminary contract to MP Materials intended to restore domestic heavy rare-earth production and separation capabilities to the United States. In November 2020, the United States Department of Defense awarded MP Materials $9.6-million as part of a government effort to increase domestic production of rare-earth materials.

On September 30, 2020, President Donald Trump issued an executive order targeting China's dominance of rare earth materials. In the executive order, he expressed concern for the heavy reliance of the US on China for 80% of rare earth materials. He reiterated the importance of producing and refining rare earth in the US and discussed various tariffs and government grants to rare earth material companies such as MP Materials.

In 2021, MP Materials received $3 million in funding from the United States Department of Energy to design and study the feasibility of a system to produce rare-earth oxides and metals from coal by-products in collaboration with the University of Kentucky.

In February 2022, US President Joe Biden announced at a press conference that the United States Department of Defense was investing $35 million into MP Materials as part of an effort to spur domestic rare-earth production in the United States. Biden said that this move was designed to reduce America's reliance on rare earth minerals imported from other countries. The Biden administration said the federal funding is earmarked to assist the company to develop a new commercial facility for “heavy” rare earth mineral processing.

On May 24, 2024, the Biden Administration announced a 25% tariff on rare-earth magnets from China, set to take effect in 2026. This marks the first time that critical minerals, including rare-earth magnets, have been specifically included in the tariffs. Following the tariffs, MP Materials put out a statement listing the tariffs. After the announcement, CEO James Litinsky attended an event with Biden at the White House.

On July 10, 2025, MP Materials announced that the United States Department of Defense will become its largest shareholder. The announcement came after the Pentagon agreed to buy $400 million of preferred stocks in the company. As part of this deal, MP Materials will construct a new rare-earth magnet facility called the "10X Facility." The initiative comes as the US looks to reduce reliance on foreign countries, particularly China, which currently supplies approximately 80% of the rare earth elements used in the US.

== See also ==
- Gina Rinehart
- Rare-earth element
- USA Rare Earth
- Vulcan Elements
- Ramaco Resources
