= Orin Atkins =

American lawyer and oil executive

- Born: Orin Ellsworth Atkins; June 6, 1924; Pittsburgh, Pennsylvania
- Died: March 23, 2007 (aged 82); Dallas, Texas
- Education: Marshall University, University of Virginia School of Law
- Years active: 1950-1981
- Known for: Chief executive officer of Ashland Oil from 1965 to 1981
- Children: 2

Orin Ellsworth Atkins (June 6, 1924 – March 23, 2007) was an American lawyer and business executive known for his time expanding the Ashland Oil business. Amid its growth, Atkins was at the center of multiple scandals.

== Early life and education ==
Atkins was born June 6, 1924, in Pittsburgh, Pennsylvania. He graduated from Marshall University and University of Virginia School of Law.

== Career ==
Atkins joined Ashland Oil in 1950, initially joining their law department. He would be promoted to an administrative vice president in 1959, eventually being appointed as chief executive officer of Ashland Oil in 1965. Ashland Oil founder Paul G. Blazer described Atkins as "one of the most capable, aggressive young lawyers" he knew.

Some time between the 1960s and 1970s, Atkins launched what would become the company, Arch Coal.

In the 1970's, Atkins, along with Ashland, were part of the Watergate scandal, where they were fined for making secret contributions in excess of $700,000 of corporate money to the re-election campaign of President Richard Nixon. In addition to those donations, Atkins and Ashland donated money to several other politicians, both Democratic and Republican, which included then-Democratic National Committee Chairman Robert S. Strauss and then-Arkansas Democratic Congressman Wilbur Mills. Atkins plead no contest to the charges, while Ashland pled guilty.

Ashland was investigated by the Securities and Exchange Commission (SEC), and in 1975, under the leadership of Atkins, admitted to paying close to $500,000 to government officials and consultants in Nigeria, the Dominican Republic, Libya, and Gabon (which included $150,000 directly to Gabon's President, Omar Bongo) in an effort to secure oil rights overseas. Atkins stated at a company meeting in 1975 that he "was doing what was done generally."

In 1980, the SEC argued that Ashland, under the leadership of Atkins, made illegal payments in excess of millions of dollars to advisers of the sultan of Oman, in violation of the Foreign Corrupt Practices Act of 1977. Atkins and Ashland settled with the SEC without admitting wrongdoing. The courting of Oman was in response to the embargo of Iranian oil, the main supplier of Ashland's oil, issued by President Jimmy Carter in 1979, following the Iran hostage crisis. He would step down in 1981 following the scandal, stating the want "to pursue personal business interests". The company experienced large-scale growth over his tenure, seeing its revenue grow from $450 million to nearly $10 billion, twenty times the value prior to Atkins. Atkins received a "lucrative" consulting contract following his departure.

In 1988, Atkins was arrested by American federal agents after he was videotaped by customs officials informing a business associate to sell secret Ashland memorandums to the National Iranian Oil Company. He offered to sell two documents to Iran that would aid in a lawsuit against Ashland, where the Iranian oil company was seeking payment for several oil tankers, in exchange for $600,000. He would plead guilty to conspiracy charges in 1989, and Ashland agreed to pay the Iranian oil company $325 million to settle its claim. Additionally, Atkins paid Ashland $2.25 million, and was sentenced to two years' probation and community service in 1990. Atkins was remorseful in statements to a federal judge, claiming "I have no excuse for my actions" and "I think some anger of resentment... short-circuited my brain."

== Personal life ==
Atkins was first married to Kathryn Agee Atkins, who died in 1989. He later married Candace Garner Atkins. Atkins had one brother, and two sons from his first marriage, Randall and Charles Atkins. Randall is a former Wall Street banker and the owner of Brook Mine, a rare-earth metals mine located in Wyoming.

Atkins served in the Army infantry during World War II and received two Purple Hearts for injuries sustained in France and in Germany.

Atkins died on March 23, 2007, at the St. Paul University Hospital in Dallas, Texas, from complications caused by pneumonia. At the time of his death, Atkins had five grandchildren.
