= Mountain Pass Rare Earth Mine =

Rare-earth element mine in California, United States

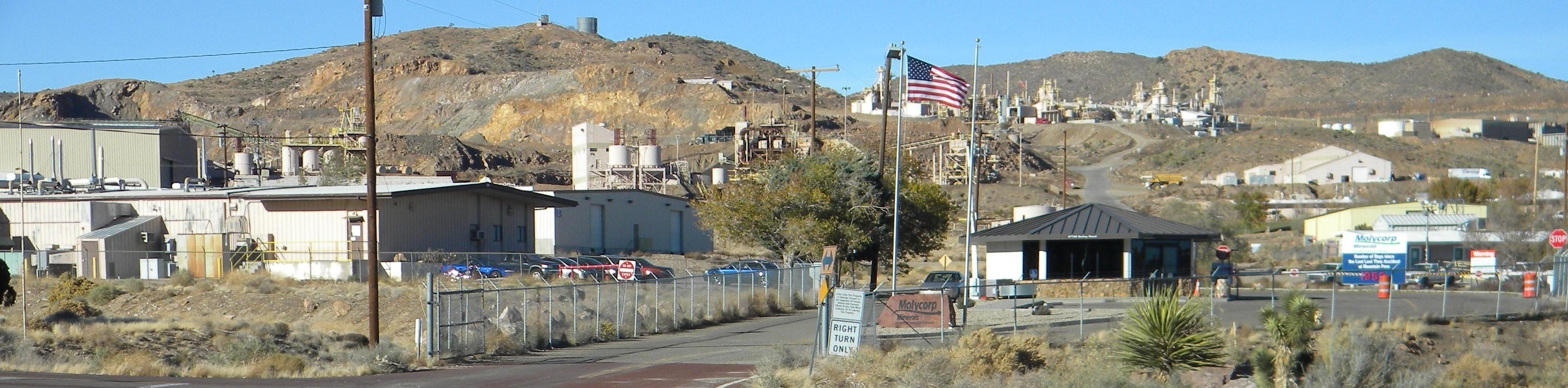
- Mountain Pass Rare Earth Mine and Processing Facility as seen in November 2010, showing the open pit at left and the mill at right

- Location in California
- Location: Mountain Pass, San Bernardino County, California; 35°28′43″N 115°31′57″W
- Products: Rare-earth elements in concentrates
- Production: 38,000 t (84,000,000 lb)
- Financial year: 2020
- Type: Open-pit
- Discovered: 1949
- Opened: 1952
- Active: 1952‍–‍2002, 2007‍–‍2015, 2017‍–‍present
- Company: MP Materials
- Website: mpmaterials.com
- Acquired: 2017

The Mountain Pass Rare Earth Mine and Processing Facility, owned by MP Materials Corp., is an open-pit mine of rare-earth elements on the south flank of the Clark Mountain Range in California, 53 miles (85 km) southwest of Las Vegas, Nevada. In 2020, the mine supplied 15.8% of the world's rare-earth production. It is the only rare-earth mining and processing facility in the United States. It was the largest single known deposit of such minerals.

From 2022, processing capabilities began again for light rare-earth elements (LREEs). The United States Department of Defense has funded the restoration of processing capabilities for heavy rare-earth metals (HREEs) to reduce supply chain risk. In 2025, the mine was reported as operating, although most of the resulting materials were processed in China.

== Geology ==
The Mountain Pass deposit is in a 1.4-billion-year-old Precambrian carbonatite intruded into gneiss. It contains 8% to 12% rare-earth oxides, mostly contained in the mineral bastnäsite. Gangue minerals include calcite, barite, and dolomite. It is regarded as a world-class rare-earth mineral deposit. The metals that can be extracted from it include cerium, lanthanum, neodymium, and europium.

At 1 July 2020, proven and probable reserves, using a 3.83% total rare-earth oxide (REO) cutoff grade, were 18.9 million tonnes of ore containing 1.36 million tonnes of REO at an average grade of 7.06% REO. The ore body is about 200 ft (61 m) thick and 2,300 ft (700 m) long.

== Ore processing ==
To process bastnäsite ore, it is finely ground and subjected to froth flotation to separate the bulk of the bastnäsite from the accompanying barite, calcite, and dolomite. Marketable products include each of the major intermediates of the ore dressing process: flotation concentrate, acid-washed flotation concentrate, calcined acid-washed bastnäsite, and finally a cerium concentrate, which was the insoluble residue left after the calcined bastnäsite had been leached with hydrochloric acid.

The lanthanides that dissolve as a result of the acid treatment are subjected to solvent extraction to capture the europium and purify the other individual components of the ore. A further product includes a lanthanide mix, depleted of much of the cerium, and essentially all of samarium and heavier lanthanides. The calcination of bastnäsite drives off the carbon dioxide content, leaving an oxide-fluoride, in which the cerium content oxidizes to the less-basic quadrivalent state. However, the high temperature of the calcination gives less-reactive oxide, and the use of hydrochloric acid, which can cause reduction of quadrivalent cerium, leads to an incomplete separation of cerium and the trivalent lanthanides.

== History ==
The Mountain Pass mine dominated worldwide REE production from the 1960s to the 1980s (USGS).

Gold mining began at the site in 1936, but the rare-earth deposits were not discovered until 1949 when prospectors in search of uranium noticed anomalously high radioactivity. Molybdenum Corporation of America bought most of the mining claims, and began small-scale production in 1952.

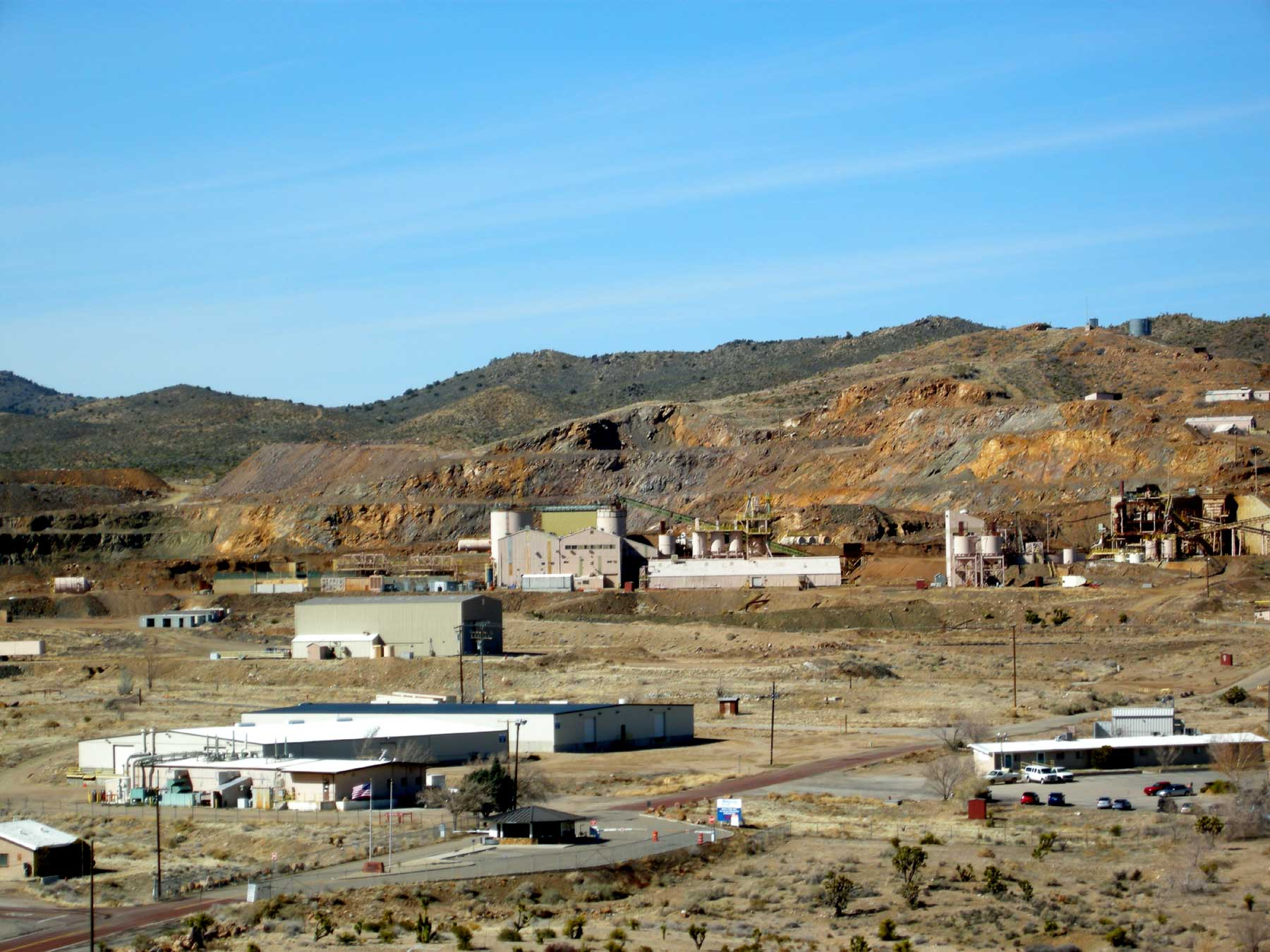
Mountain Pass mine, mill, shop & offices in 2010

Production expanded greatly in the 1960s, to supply demand for europium used in color television screens. The mine produced 70 percent of the world’s rare-earth supplies until the early 1980s. Between 1965 and 1995, the mine supplied most of the worldwide rare-earth metals consumption.

Molybdenum Corporation of America changed its name to Molycorp in 1974. The corporation was acquired by Union Oil in 1977, which in turn became part of Chevron Corporation in 2005.

In 1998, the mine's separation plant ceased production of refined rare-earth compounds; it continued to produce bastnäsite concentrate.

The mine closed in 2002 after a toxic waste spill, and then was not reopened due to competition from Chinese suppliers, though processing of previously mined ore continued.

In 2008, Chevron sold the mine to privately held Molycorp Minerals LLC, a company formed to revive the Mountain Pass mine. Molycorp announced plans to spend $500 million to reopen and expand the mine, and on July 29, 2010, it raised about $400 million through an initial public offering, selling 28,125,000 shares at $14 under the ticker symbol MCP on the New York Stock Exchange.

In December 2010, Molycorp announced that it had secured all the environmental permits needed to build a new ore processing plant at the mine; construction would begin in January 2011, and was expected to be completed by the end of 2012. On August 27, 2012, the company announced that mining had restarted.

The processing plant was in full production on June 25, 2015, when Molycorp filed for Chapter 11 bankruptcy with outstanding bonds in the amount of $1.4 billion. The company's shares were removed from the NYSE.

In August 2015, it was reported that the mine was to be shut down.

On August 31, 2016, Molycorp Inc. emerged from bankruptcy as Neo Performance Materials, leaving behind the mine as Molycorp Minerals LLC in its own separate Chapter 11 bankruptcy. As of January 2016, its shares were traded OTC under the symbol MCPIQ.

Mountain Pass was acquired out of bankruptcy in July 2017 with the goal of reviving America's rare-earth industry. MP Materials resumed mining and refining operations in January 2018.

=== Current ownership ===
MP Materials is 51.8%-owned by US hedge funds JHL Capital Group (and its CEO James Litinsky) and QVT Financial LP, while Shenghe Resources, a partially state-owned enterprise of the Government of China, holds an 8.0% stake. Apart from institutions, the public owns 18%.

=== Environmental impact ===
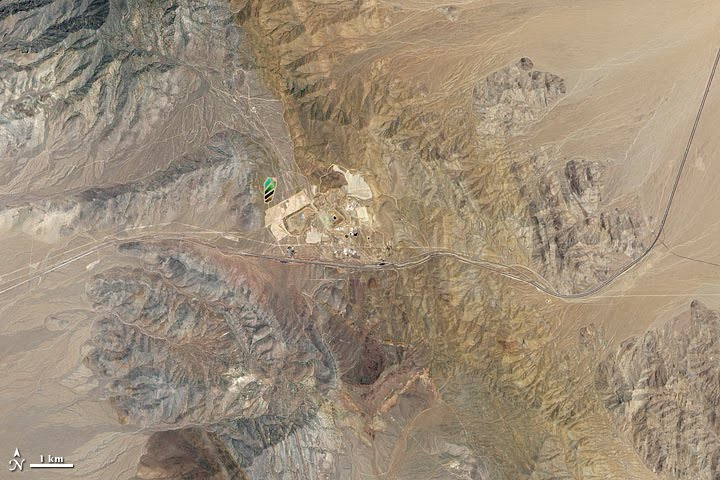
Satellite image of the Mountain Pass mine and vicinity (2011)

In the 1980s, the company began piping wastewater up to 14 miles (23 km) to evaporation ponds on or near Ivanpah Dry Lake, east of Interstate 15 near Nevada. This pipeline repeatedly ruptured during cleaning operations to remove mineral deposits called scale. The scale is radioactive because of the presence of thorium and radium, which occur naturally in the rare-earth ore. A federal investigation later found that some 60 spills—some of which went unreported—occurred between 1984 and 1998, when the pipeline and chemical processing at the mine were shut down. In all, about 600,000 US gallons (2,300,000 L) of radioactive and other hazardous waste flowed onto the desert floor, according to federal authorities. By the end of the 1990s, Unocal was served with a cleanup order and a San Bernardino County district attorney's lawsuit. The company paid more than $1.4 million in fines and settlements. After preparing a cleanup plan and completing an extensive environmental study, Unocal in 2004 won approval of a county permit that allowed the mine to operate for another 30 years. The mine passed a key county inspection in 2007.

=== Current activity ===
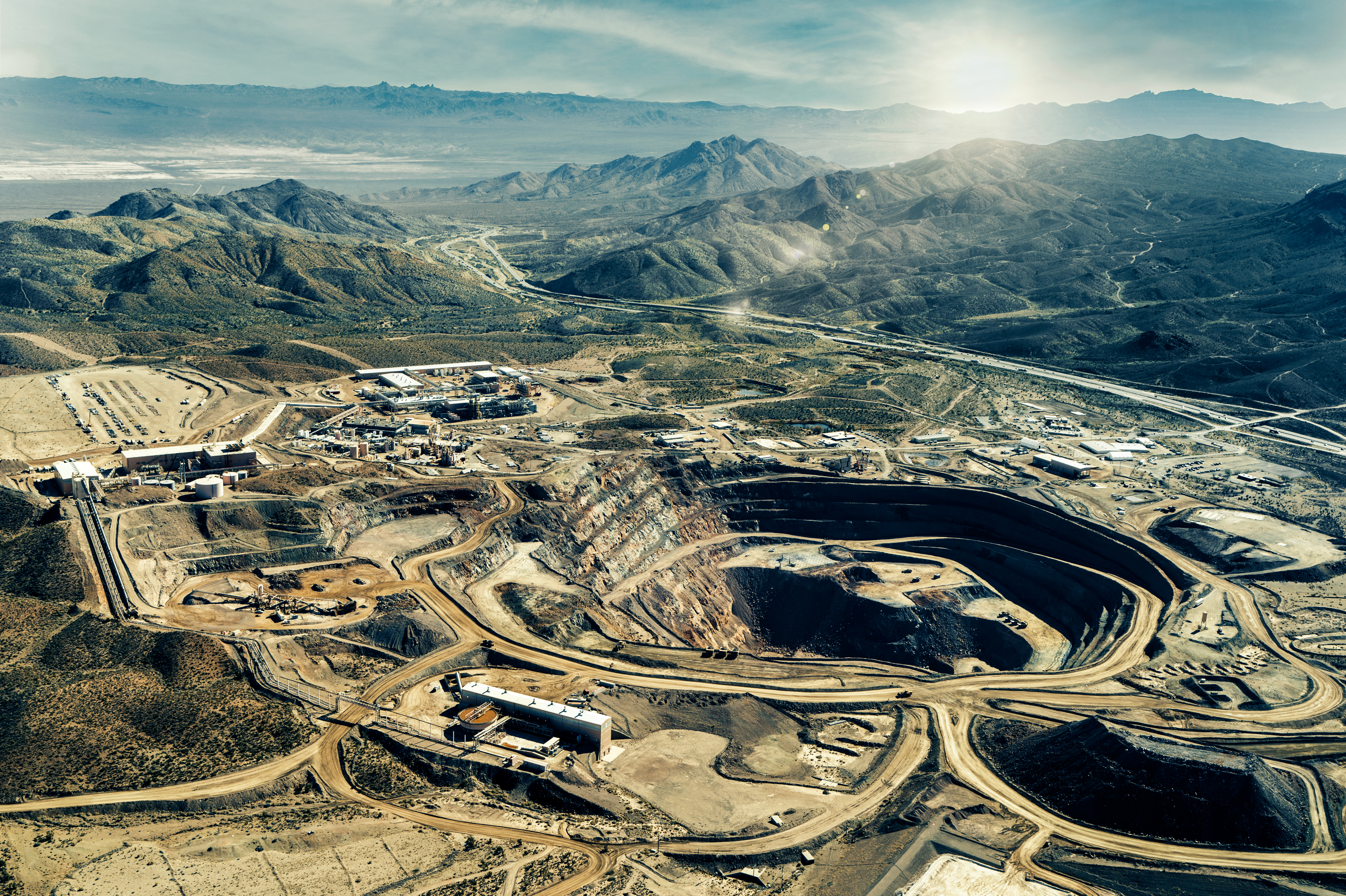
Mountain Pass mine in 2022

Since 2007, China has restricted exports of REEs (rare-earth elements) and imposed export tariffs, both to conserve resources and to give preference to Chinese manufacturers. In 2009, China supplied more than 96% of the world's REEs. Some outside China are concerned that because rare-earths are essential to some high-tech, renewable-energy, and defense-related technologies, the world should not be so reliant on a single supplier country

On September 22, 2010, China quietly enacted a ban on exports of rare-earths to Japan, a move suspected to be in retaliation for the Japanese arrest of a Chinese trawler captain in a territorial dispute. Because Japan and China are the only current sources for rare-earth magnetic material used in the US, a permanent disruption of Chinese rare-earth supply to Japan would leave China as the sole source. Jeff Green, a rare-earth lobbyist, said, "We are going to be 100 percent reliant on the Chinese to make the components for the defense supply chain." The House Committee on Science and Technology scheduled on September 23, 2010, the review of a detailed bill to subsidize the revival of the American rare-earths industry, including the reopening of the Mountain Pass mine.

After China doubled import duties on rare-earth concentrates to 25% as a result of the US-China trade war, MP Materials said, in May 2019, it will start its own partial processing operation in the United States, though full processing operations without Shenghe Resources have been delayed. According to Bloomberg, China in 2019 established a plan for restricting US access to Chinese heavy rare-earth elements, should the punitive step be deemed necessary. In 2022, the company announced that it had secured Department of Defense grants to support both light rare-earth elements (LREEs) and heavy rare-earth elements (HREEs). The facility plans to begin separating NdPr oxide in early 2023.

== See also ==
- Brook Mine
- China–United States trade war
- Economy of California
- Mining in the United States
- Vulcan Elements
