= Fluor Corporation =

American engineering and construction firm

Coordinates: 32.900282°N 96.952879°W

- Type: Public
- Traded as: NYSE: FLR; S&P 400 component
- Industry: Engineering and construction
- Founded: 1912; 114 years ago in Santa Ana, California, U.S.
- Founder: John Simon Fluor
- Headquarters: Irving, Texas, United States
- Key people: Jim Breuer (CEO); David E. Constable (Executive Chairman)
- Revenue: ▲US$16.3 billion (2024)
- Operating income: ▲US$463 million (2024)
- Net income: ▲US$2.15 billion (2024)
- Total assets: ▲US$9.14 billion (2024)
- Total equity: ▲US$3.95 billion (2024)
- Number of employees: 26,866 (2024)
- Website: fluor.com

Fluor Corporation is an American engineering and construction firm, headquartered in Irving, Texas. It is a holding company that provides services through its subsidiaries in three main areas: oil and gas, industrial and infrastructure, government and power. It is the largest publicly traded engineering and construction company in the Fortune 500 rankings and is listed as 265th overall.

Fluor was founded in 1912 by John Simon Fluor as Fluor Construction Company. It grew quickly, predominantly by building oil refineries, pipelines, and other facilities for the oil and gas industry, at first in California, and then in the Middle East and globally. In the late 1960s, it began diversifying into oil drilling, coal mining and other raw materials like lead. A global recession in the oil and gas industry and losses from its mining operation led to restructuring and layoffs in the 1980s. Fluor sold its oil operations and diversified its construction work into a broader range of services and industries.

In the 1990s, Fluor introduced new services like equipment rentals and staffing. Nuclear waste cleanup projects and other environmental work became a significant portion of Fluor's revenues. The company also did projects related to the Manhattan Project, rebuilding after the Iraq War, recovering from Hurricane Katrina and building the Trans-Alaska Pipeline System.

== Corporate history ==
=== Early history ===
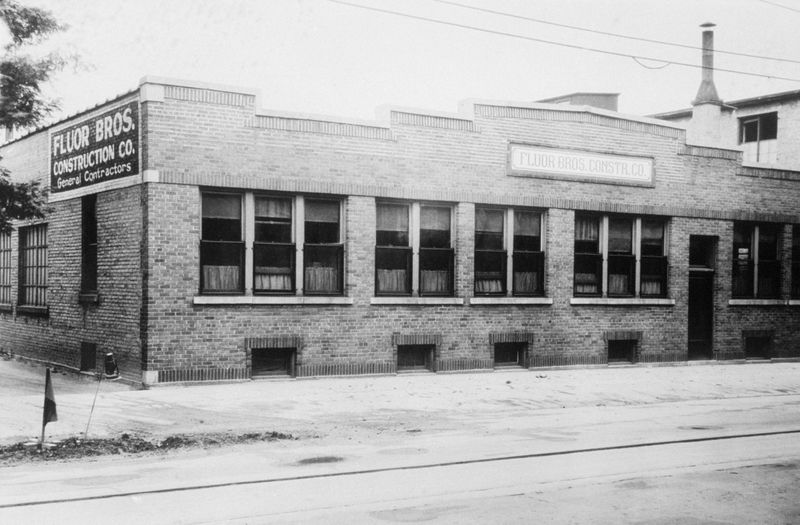
Headquarters of Fluor Bros Construction in the early 1900s

Fluor Corporation's predecessor, Rudolph Fluor & Brother, was founded in 1890 by John Simon Fluor and his two brothers in Oshkosh, Wisconsin as a saw and paper mill. John Fluor acted as its president and contributed $100 in personal savings to help the business get started. The company was renamed Fluor Bros. Construction Co. in 1903.

In 1912 John Fluor moved to Santa Ana, California for health reasons without his brothers and founded Fluor Corporation out of his garage under the name Fluor Construction Company. By 1924 the business had annual revenues of $100,000 ($1.56 million in 2021 dollars) and a staff of 100 employees. John Fluor delegated most of the company's operations to his sons, Peter and Simon Fluor. A $100,000 capital investment was made that year and it was incorporated. John's eldest son Peter served as head of sales and grew the company to $1.5 million ($20.4 million in 2013 dollars) in revenues by 1929. In 1929 the company re-incorporated as Fluor Corporation. By the 1930s, Fluor had operations in Europe, the Middle East and Australia. Business declined rapidly during the Great Depression, but picked up again during World War II. During the war Fluor manufactured synthetic rubber and was responsible for a substantial portion of high-octane gasoline production in the United States. A Gas-Gasoline division of Fluor was created in Houston in 1948.

Fluor's headquarters were moved to Alhambra, an inner suburb of Los Angeles, in 1940 in order to be closer to its oil and gas clients, before moving again to Orange County, California in the 1960s due to concerns about the cost of living and traffic. John Simon Fluor died in 1944. He was succeeded by his son Peter Fluor, who died three years later. Peter was followed by Shirley Meserve (1947) and Donald Darnell (1949), then John Simon "Si" Fluor Jr. in 1952 and J. Robert (Bob) Fluor in 1962. Fluor was listed on the New York Stock Exchange in the 1950s. In 1961, Fluor acquired an interest in construction, design and contracting firm William J. Moran.

=== Diversification and restructuring ===
Fluor diversified its business more extensively in 1967, when five companies were merged into a division called Coral Drilling and it started a deep-water oil exploration business in Houston called Deep Oil Technology. It also created Fluor Ocean Services in Houston in 1968 and acquired an interest in other fossil fuel operations in the 1970s. Fluor acquired a construction company, Pike Corp. of America and the engineering division of its prior partner in Australia, Utah Construction. In 1972, Fluor bought land in Irvine, California and started building its new headquarters on it. The following year, the company's oil and gas operations were consolidated under a new entity, Fluor Oil and Gas Corp.

In 1977, Fluor acquired Daniel International Corporation. Fluor's business had become predominantly international, while Daniel International's $1 billion construction business was mostly domestic. The acquisition allowed the company to use union labor at Fluor, or non-union labor at Daniel, for each client. Fluor made a $2.9 billion acquisition of a zinc, gold, lead and coal mining operation, St. Joe Minerals, in 1981 after a bidding competition for the business with Seagram.

By the 1980s, Fluor's primary business was building large refineries, petrochemical plants, oil pipelines and other facilities for the gas and oil industry, especially in the Middle East. By 1981, Fluor's staff had grown to 29,000 and revenue, backlog, and profits had each increased more than 30 percent over the prior year. However, by 1984 the mining operation was causing heavy losses and the oil and gas industry Fluor served was in a worldwide recession due to declining oil prices. From 1981 to 1984, Fluor's backlog went from $16 billion to $4 billion. In 1985 it reported $633 million in losses. David Tappan took Bob Fluor's place as CEO in 1984 after Bob died from cancer and led a difficult restructuring.

The company sold $750 million in assets, including Fluor's headquarters in Irvine, in order to pay $1 billion in debt. Staff were reduced from 32,000 to 14,000. In 1986 Fluor sold all of its oil assets and some of its gold mining operations. Fluor Engineers, Inc. and Daniel International were merged, forming Fluor Daniel. By 1987, Fluor had returned to profitability with $26.6 million in profits and $108.5 million by 1989. By the end of the restructuring, Fluor had three major divisions: Fluor Daniel, Fluor Construction International and St. Joe Minerals Corp. Each division had its own smaller subsidiaries. Fluor started being named by Engineering News as the largest construction and engineering company in the United States. Fluor's international revenues rebounded. Having postponed his retirement to help Fluor, Tappan stepped down at the end of 1989 and was replaced by Leslie McCraw.

=== Recent history ===
During the restructuring, Fluor's core construction and engineering work was diversified into 30 industries including food, paper manufacturers, prisons and others to reduce its vulnerability to market changes in the oil and gas market. In the 1990s, the company tried to change its image, calling itself a "diversified technical services" firm. It started offering equipment rentals, staffing services, and financing for construction projects. The company began offering environmental cleanup and pollution control services, which grew to half of its new business by 1992. Fluor's mining business grew from $300 million in 1990 to $1 billion in 1994. The US government passed environmental regulations in 1995 that led to growth for the Massey Coal Co. business, because it had large reserves of low-sulfur coal. In 1992, Fluor sold its ownership of Doe Run Company, the world's largest producer of refined lead, which was losing money at the time due to declining lead prices. By 1993, Fluor had revenues of $4.17 billion and 22,000 staff.

In 1997, Fluor's revenues fell almost 50 percent, in part due to the Asian financial crisis and a decrease in overseas business. Additionally, it suffered losses from an over-budget power plant project in Rabigh, Saudi Arabia. Fluor was a sub-contractor to General Electric for the project. Fluor's subsidiaries sued GE alleging that it misrepresented the complexity of the project. Though revenues declined further the following year, profits were increasing. In 1999, nearly 5,000 workers were laid off from Fluor Daniel and 15 offices were closed. Fluor Daniel was re-structured into four business groups: an engineering and construction firm called Fluor Daniel; an equipment rental, staffing and telecommunications division called Fluor Global Services; a coal-mining business called A.T. Massey Coal Co. and an administrative and support division called Fluor Signature Services.

In January 1998, McCraw (age 63) resigned after being diagnosed with bladder cancer and was replaced by former Shell Oil President, Philip J. Carroll. That same year, IT Group purchased a 54 percent interest in Fluor Daniel GTI, Fluor's environmental division, for $36.3 million. Two years later, the coal mining operation under the A.T. Massey Coal Co. name (part of St. Joe) was spun off into its own business. In 2001, Fluor's four primary subsidiaries were consolidated into a single Fluor Corporation. In 2002 Alan Boeckmann was appointed as the CEO, followed by David Seaton in 2011. In 2005, Fluor's headquarters were moved to the Las Colinas area in Irving, Texas.

In December 2015, Fluor announced that it would take over Dutch industrial services company Stork. The acquisition of this company, which modifies and maintains large power plants, was completed in March 2016, in a stock purchase worth $755 million. Fluor Corporation announced September 07, 2023 that it has agreed to sell its Stork business in Belgium, Germany, the Netherlands, as well as its turbo blading manufacturing operations in the United States to industrial services provider Bilfinger SE.

In May 2019, David Seaton stepped down as CEO and was replaced by Carlos Hernandez, who joined the firm in 2007. In 2020, Fluor announced chairman of the board David E. Constable would be appointed to the CEO position, starting in 2021. He was subsequently replaced by Jim Breuer in 2025.

In October 2025, it was reported that activist investor Starboard Value took a nearly 5% stake in Fluor. Starboard suggested Fluor should benefit from policies in the second Trump administration which would accelerate a wave of planned investments in the US.

== Organization ==
Fluor was ranked 259th in Fortune 500 companies for the year 2022. It has offices in 25 countries. Many of Fluor's operations are located near natural resources, such as uranium in Canada, oil reserves in the Middle East and mines in Australia. About 30 percent of Fluor's revenues are based in the United States as of 2011.

Fluor received an "A" ranking in Transparency International's 2012 anti-corruption study. The company hosts online and in-person anti-corruption training sessions for staff and operates an ethics hotline. Former CEO Alan Boeckmann helped create the Partnering Against Corruption Initiative (PACI), whereby companies agree to a set of ethics principles. A MarketLine SWOT analysis said Fluor's environmental work "enhances the company's brand image," while often lengthy and unpredictable legal disputes "tarnish the company's brand image and will erode customer confidence."

It started the Fluor Foundation for its charitable work in 1952 and Fluor Cares in 2010. The company started the largest employer-sponsored apprenticeship program in California with a four-year program for designers in 1982. Fluor operates a virtual college for employees called Fluor University.

== Services ==
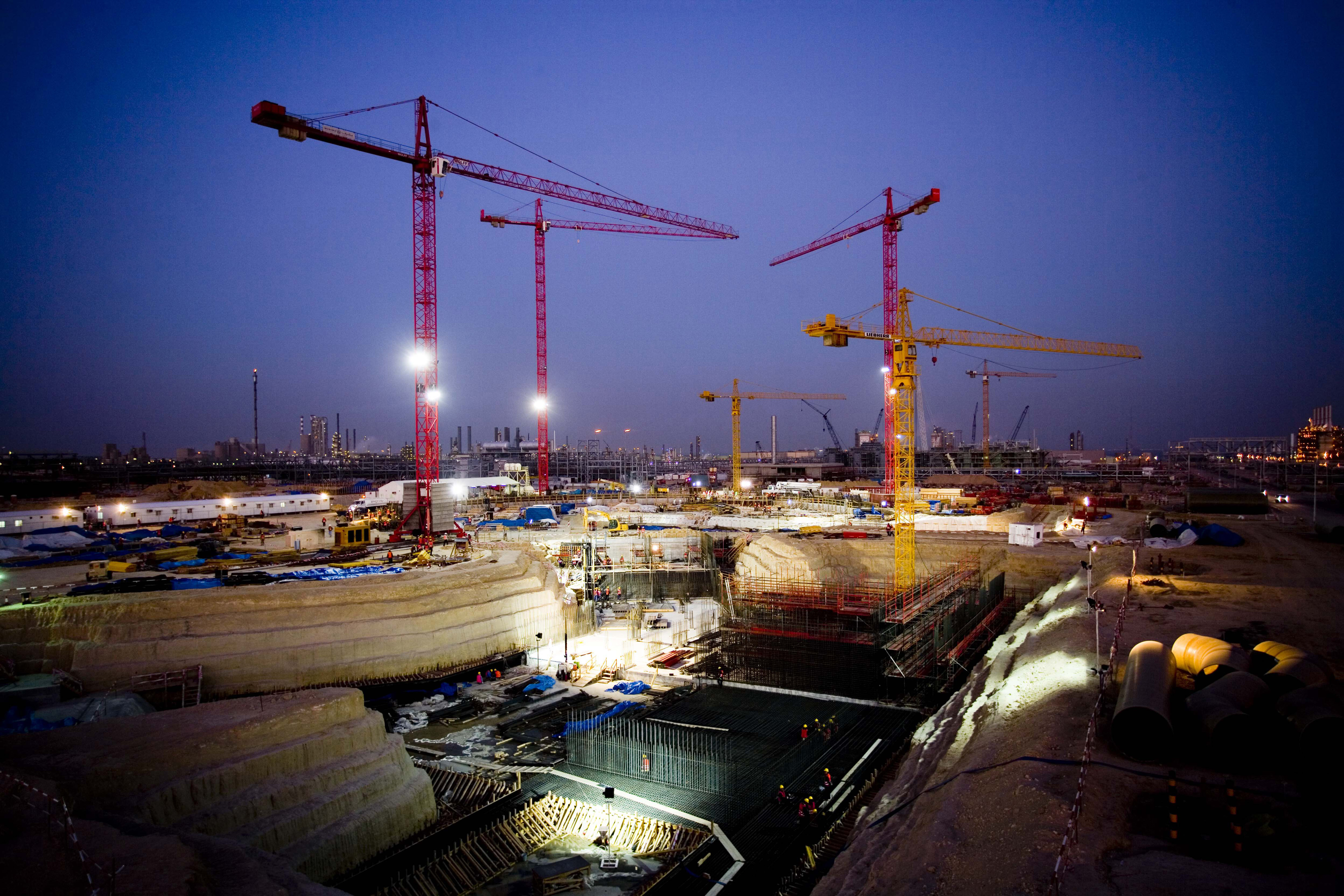
A Fluor construction site in Shuaiba, Kuwait

Fluor is a holding company that provides services through its subsidiaries. Its subsidiaries provide engineering, procurement, construction, maintenance and project management services. The company has also developed pollution control products, such as the Econamine lineup of carbon capture products. Fluor's work includes designing and building power plants, petrochemical factories, mining facilities, roads and bridges, government buildings, and manufacturing facilities. The company also performs nuclear cleanup, and other services.

Separate teams of experts, procurement staff, project managers and workers are provided for large projects that are supported by a centralized administrative staff. Fluor has trained more than 100,000 craft workers in Indonesia, the Philippines, Korea, Pakistan, Kuwait and other countries, where the needed labor skills weren't available locally. It may also serve clients through a joint venture with another construction firm when a local infrastructure or niche expertise is needed.

Fluor acquired shares of Genentech Inc. in 1981, and it bought a 10 percent interest in a smelter and refinery facility in Gresik, Indonesia in 1995 for $550 million. In 1994, it invested $650 million with the Beacon Group Energy Investment fund to finance energy projects. Fluor also has a majority interest in NuScale LLC., which is developing a new type of 45-megawatt nuclear reactor called a small modular reactor (SMR).

== Notable projects ==
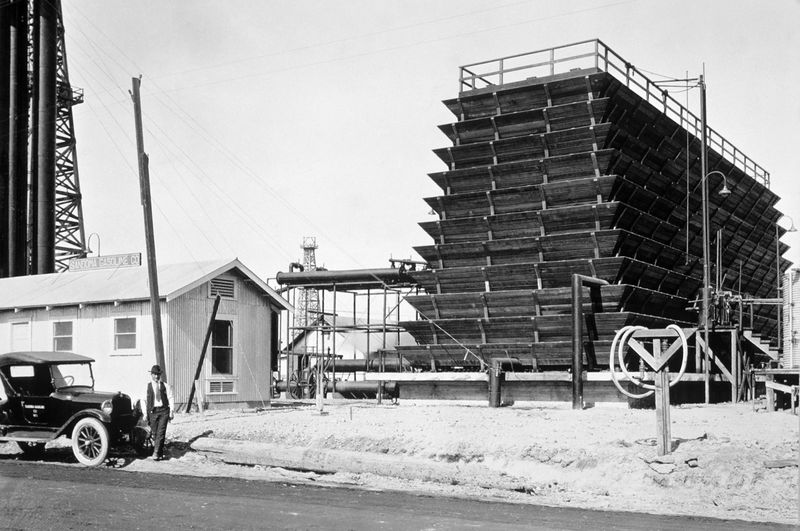
A Fluor "Buddha Tower" water cooling tower from the early 1900s

Fluor's first projects were in constructing and grading roads, but by the 1920s it was known for building public facilities, industrial complexes and serving a growing California oil and gas industry. It started building office and meter manufacturing facilities for the Southern California Gas Company in 1915, as well as a compressor station for the Industrial Fuel Supply Company in 1919. Fluor built the first "Buddha Tower" in 1921 in Signal Hill, California, for the Industrial Fuel Supply Company. The Buddha Tower was a design of water-cooling tower named after the Buddha temples they resemble. The following year Fluor was awarded a contract by Richfield Oil to build a 10,000-gallon-per-day gasoline plant.

Against his father's wishes, Peter Fluor expanded Fluor's business outside of California in the 1930s. It built refineries in Texas, as well as oil pipelines and compressor stations from Panhandle, Texas, to Indianapolis, Indiana, for the Panhandle Eastern Pipeline Company. Fluor constructed the Escondida in Chile, which is the second-largest copper mine in the world. In 1942, Fluor constructed cooling towers and other facilities in Hanford, Washington, for the Manhattan Project. It built an expansion of the Dhahran Airfield in Saudi Arabia for the United States Army in the 1950s and accepted its first international project for ARAMCO in the Middle East.

In the 1960s and 1970s, Fluor built the first all-hydrogen refinery in Kuwait and the first exclusively offshore power plant for the Atlantic Richfield Company. It also constructed pumps and ports for the Trans-Alaska Pipeline System, which traversed 800 miles from northern Alaska to Valdez, Alaska, and the world's largest offshore facility for natural gas on the island of Java in Indonesia. In 1976, it was awarded a $5 billion project for ARAMCO in Saudi Arabia, to design facilities that capture sour gas, which is expelled from oil wells as waste, in order to refine it into fuel. That same year a partially completed copper and cobalt mine in Africa was cancelled due to a war in the neighboring region of Angola and declining copper prices. In 1979, Fluor had 13 projects for building United States power plants and had served more than half of the world's government-owned oil companies.

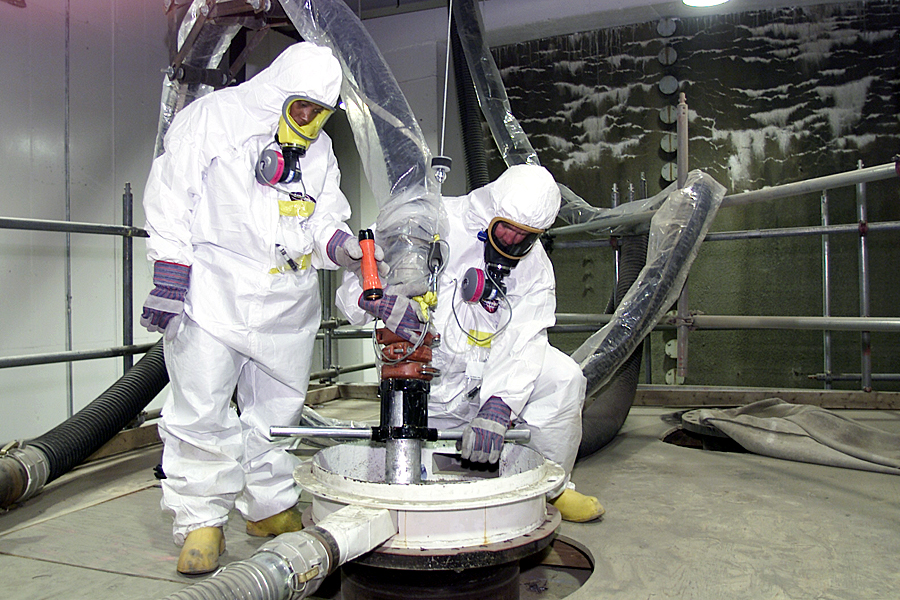
Fluor workers at a radiation cleanup site in Ohio

Fluor has been working on the cleanup and shutdown of atomic energy plants in Ohio and Washington since the 1990s. In 1992, Fluor won a contract with the United States Energy Department to clean up nuclear waste. By 1996 Hanford was the most contaminated nuclear site in the US and the US Department of Energy was conducting a $50 billion to $60 billion cleanup of the site. Fluor Hanford Inc. replaced Westinghouse Hanford Co. on the project. After a chemical explosion in 1997, 11 workers filed a lawsuit alleging they were denied appropriate medical attention and protective gear. Fluor and the workers disagreed on whether the explosion resulted in any injuries. In 2005 the US Department of Energy fined Fluor for safety violations and that same year a jury awarded $4.7 million in damages to eleven pipe fitters who claimed they were fired after complaining that a valve rated for 1,975 pounds per square inch (psi) was being used where a valve rated at 2,235 psi was needed.

Fluor built the Aladdin Hotel & Casino in Las Vegas in 2001 for $1.4 billion. In 2004, the company was awarded a $1.1 billion project with AMEC to help rebuild the water, power and civic infrastructure of Iraq after the Iraq War. Fluor has also built a rail line in Europe and missile sites in California and possibly Arizona. The company provided disaster recovery services in Louisiana after Hurricane Katrina. In 2010 Fluor provided workers to clean up oil tar on beaches in Florida and Alabama after the Deepwater Horizon oil spill. In December 2012, Fluor was awarded a $3.14 billion contract to build a new Tappan Zee Bridge over the Hudson River.

Fluor built a rare earths processing plant for the Australian resources company, Iluka Resources, in 2022. It would additionally design an American-based rare earths processing plant for Ramaco Resources in 2024, expanding on plans for Brook Mine.

== See also ==
- NuScale Power
- Genentech
