= Economy of California =

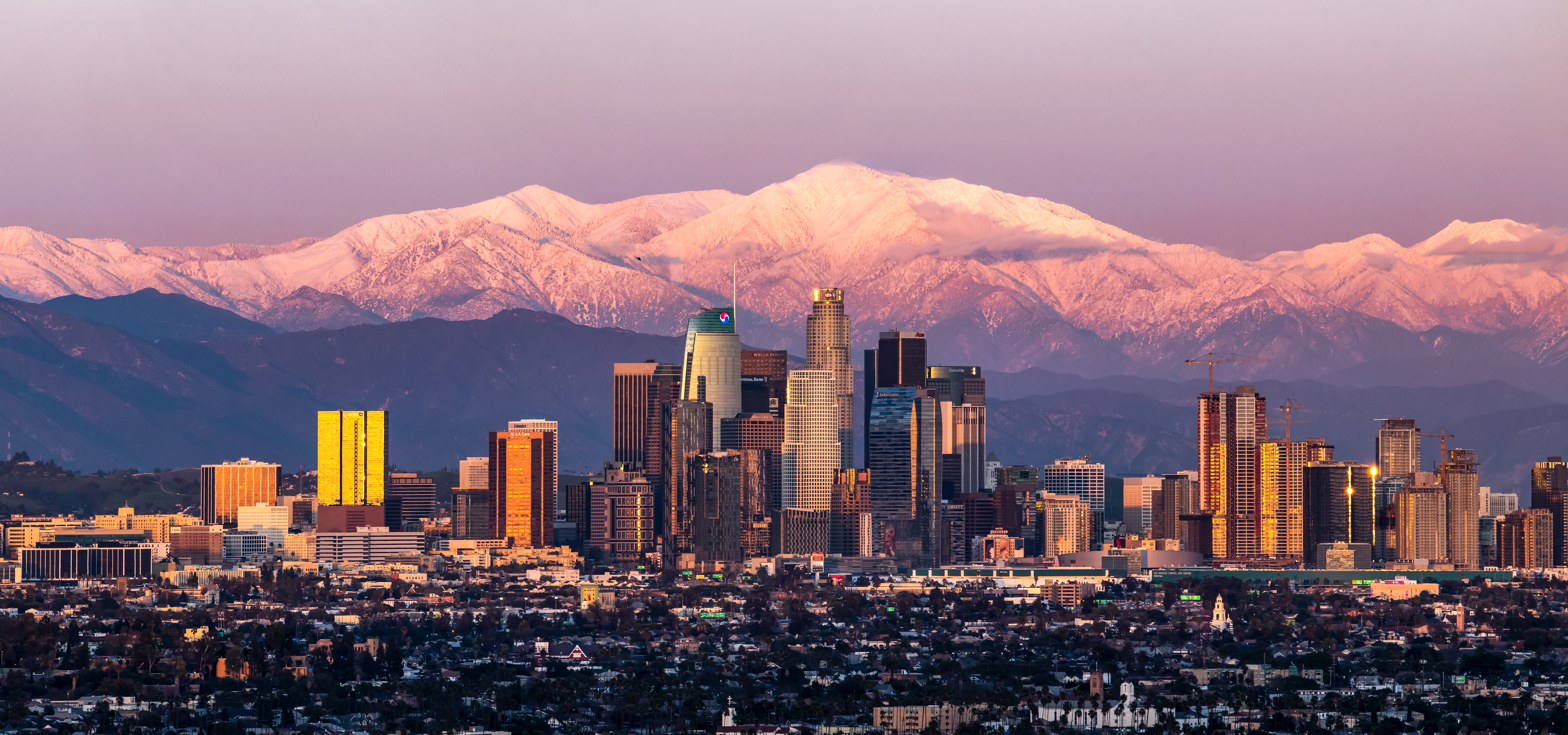
- Los Angeles, the largest city in California

Statistics
- Population: 39,355,309 (2025)
- GDP: $4.297 trillion (2025)
- GDP per capita: $109,196 (2025)
- Population below national poverty line: 11.8% (official); 17.7% (supplemental)
- Labor force: 19,851,300 (September 2025)
- Unemployment: 5.1% (Aug. 2026)

Public finance
- Revenue: $291.11 billion (2026-27)
- Spending: $237.66 billion (2026-27)

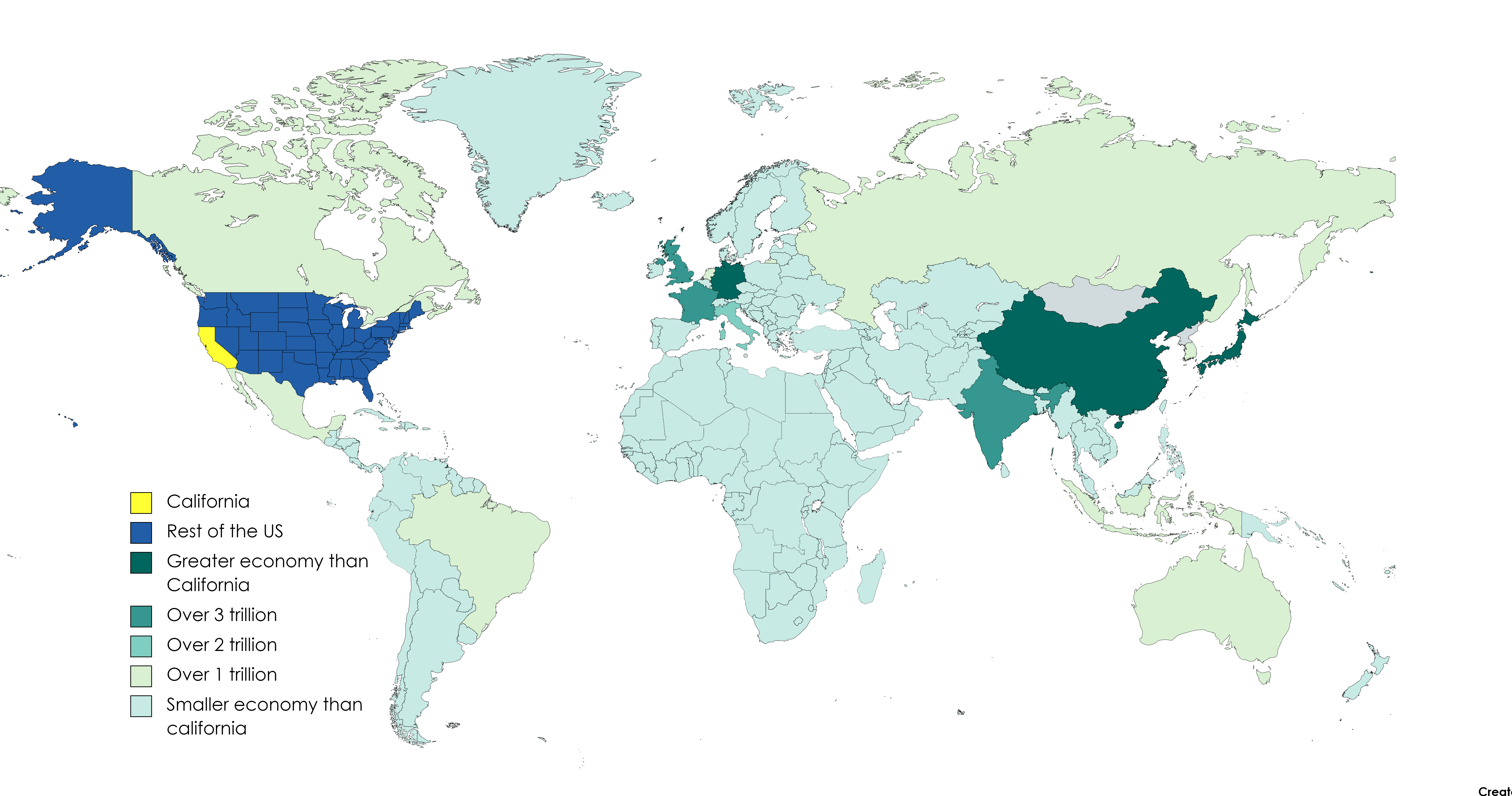
The 2021 California economy compared to the rest of U.S. and other countries, showing the larger economies in nominal GDP terms

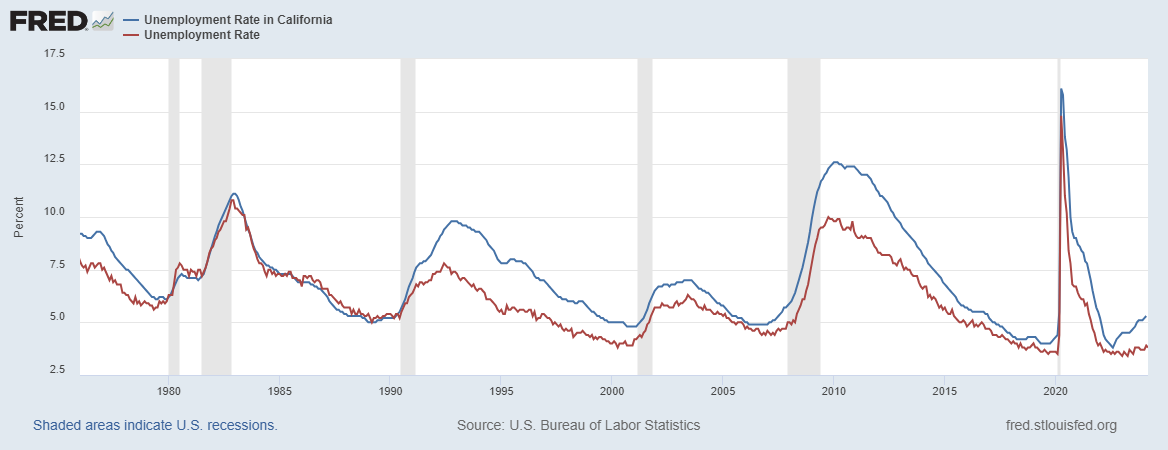
California unemployment rate, 1976–2024 US unemployment rate

The economy of the State of California is the largest in the United States, with a $4.297 trillion gross state product (GSP) as of 2025. It is the largest sub-national economy in the world. If California were an independent nation, it would rank as the fourth largest economy in the world in nominal terms, behind Germany and ahead of Japan.

California's Silicon Valley is home to some of the world's most valuable technology companies, including Apple, Alphabet, and Nvidia. As of June 2025, 58 of the Fortune 500 companies are headquartered in California.

As both the most populous US state and one of the most climatologically diverse states, the economy of California is varied, with many sizable sectors. The most dominant of these sectors include finance, business services, government and manufacturing. Much of the economic activity is concentrated in the coastal cities, especially Los Angeles, which has a relative focus on media—most notably Hollywood—and the San Francisco Bay Area, which predominantly concentrates on technology. Both cities, along with other major ports such as San Diego, also act as significant trade hubs to and from the United States. Furthermore, California's agriculture industry has the highest output of any U.S. state, with its Central Valley being one of the most productive agricultural regions on Earth, growing over half the country's fruits, vegetables, and nuts. Droughts in California are affecting business and industry in addition to agriculture.

== GDP by county ==
This list shows nominal gross domestic product (GDP) by county in millions of US$, in 2022.

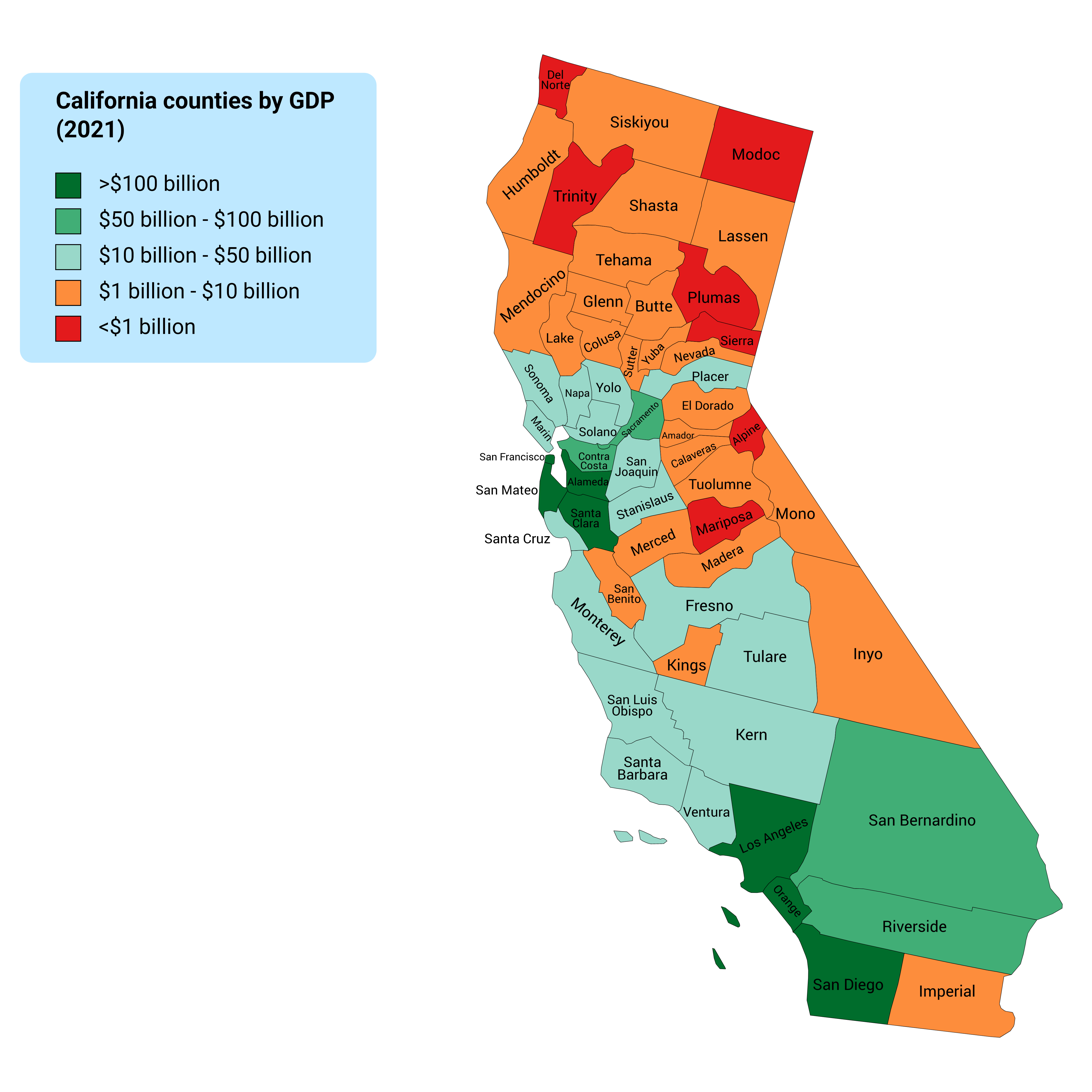
California counties by GDP 2021 (chained 2012 US$)

Rank (2022)	County	GDP (million US$)
1	Los Angeles	913,292.121
2	Santa Clara	400,777.502
3	Orange	314,177.082
4	San Diego	295,644.871
5	San Francisco	252,186.339
6	San Mateo	177,912.200
7	Alameda	168,506.397
8	San Bernardino	122,548.771
9	Sacramento	116,260.531
10	Riverside	115,363.850
11	Contra Costa	94,802.099
12	Ventura	62,328.544
13	Kern	57,540.870
14	Fresno	55,426.932
15	San Joaquin	40,227.907
16	Sonoma County	36,876.932
17	Santa Barbara	36,081.257
18	Marin	35,697.807
19	Solano	35,407.753
20	Monterey	33,248.856
21	Placer	31,396.287
22	Stanislaus	28,673.725
23	Tulare	22,794.238
24	San Luis Obispo	21,712.946
25	Santa Cruz	19,175.929
26	Yolo	18,735.314
27	Napa	13,165.651
28	Merced	11,560.438
29	Butte	11,077.391
30	Imperial	11,064.218
31	Shasta	9,920.685
32	El Dorado	9,876.986
33	Kings	8,145.669
34	Madera	7,737.581
35	Humboldt	6,843.306
36	Nevada	5,392.918
37	Sutter	4,840.246
38	Mendocino	4,277.135
39	Yuba	3,767.920
40	Tuolumne	2,884.009
41	San Benito	2,735.746
42	Tehama	2,516.858
43	Lake	2,273.787
44	Siskiyou	2,007.673
45	Amador	1,920.935
46	Colusa	1,780.929
47	Calaveras	1,641.639
48	Inyo	1,354.674
49	Mono	1,311.754
50	Lassen	1,297.714
51	Glenn	1,248.681
52	Plumas	1,121.249
53	Del Norte	947.225
54	Mariposa	849.397
55	Modoc	579.842
56	Trinity	465.968
57	Alpine	117.412
58	Sierra	114.332
	California	3,691,811.987

== History ==
California has experienced waves of migration in the past. Once the Treaty of Guadalupe Hidalgo of 1848 was coercively signed with Mexico, the US acquired the future states of California, Nevada, Utah, Arizona, New Mexico as well as the independent territory of Texas the newly acquired territories underwent rapid and extensive development. In 1847, California was controlled (with much difficulty due to deserters leaving to look for gold) by a U.S. Army-appointed military governor and an inadequate force of a little over 600 troops. After the finding of extensive gold deposits in California, the California gold rush started in 1848. Commerce and economic activity in California initially centered around the vastly expanded cities of San Francisco, San Jose, and Sacramento as they scrambled to supply the hordes of gold miners. Meanwhile, Los Angeles initially remained a less populated settlement with fewer than 5,000 residents.

Prior to 1850, the government was judged inadequate and poorly run, and statehood status was sought to start trying to remedy this problem. Due to the California Gold Rush, by 1850 California had grown to have a non-Indian and non-Californio population (about 7,000 Californios were residing in California in 1850) of over 110,000. Despite a major conflict in the U.S. Congress on the number of slave versus non-slave states, the large, rapid and continuing California population gains and the large amount of gold being exported east gave California enough clout to choose its own extensive boundaries, elect its representatives and senators, write its Constitution, and be admitted to the Union as a free state in 1850 without going through territorial status as required for most other new states.

Soon after gaining statehood in 1850, the state required and paid through taxes for nearly universal elementary school education. Other private schools were founded and are still doing well. In the 1930s California was a leader in the high school movement to educate students beyond elementary school. State-subsidized college educations have a long history in California as well as many private elementary, middle, high schools, colleges and universities. There are three public funded higher education systems in the state: the California State University (CSU) (founded 1857), the University of California (UC) system (founded 1868), and the California Community College System (CCCS) founded in 1967. CSU is the largest university system in the United States. CSU has 23 campuses and eight off-campus centers enrolling 437,000 students with 44,000 faculty members and staff, The University of California was founded in 1868 in Berkeley as a state supported university. As of fall 2011, the University of California has 10 campuses, a combined student body of 234,464 students, 18,896 faculty members, 189,116 staff members, and over 1,600,000 living alumni. The California Community College System consisting of 112 community colleges in 72 community college districts in California has over 1,800,000 students. California also has an extensive private college system of over 133 colleges and universities including California Institute of Technology (Caltech) and Stanford University. (See: List of colleges and universities in California)

About half the settlers coming to California after 1846 came by the wagon trains on the California Trail (a trip of about 140–160 days). The other half came by sea via paddle steamers going to and from the Isthmus of Panama or Nicaragua (about a 40+ day trip). The building of the Panama Railroad in 1855 made this a much more used route especially for passengers. The other main sailing ship route was going around Cape Horn, about a 120-day (via Clippers) or 200 day trip by regular sailing ship. Nearly all freight to California till 1869 took this long route around South America—shipping by ship has nearly always been relatively slow but cheap. Overland shipping was too difficult and took too long for nearly all cargo. The First Transcontinental Telegraph replaced the Pony Express in 1861 and established the first rapid communication with the east coast. The First transcontinental railroad was completed across the future states of Nebraska, Wyoming, Utah and the new states of Nevada (est. 1864) and California in 1869 and cut this trip to about 7 days. This rail link tied California and the rest of the Pacific states firmly into the union and led to much more rapid and profitable commerce between the states. In 1886 the first refrigerated cars on the Southern Pacific Railroad entered operation. The loading of such cars with oranges, at Los Angeles on February 14, 1886, started an economic boom in the citrus industry of Southern California, by making deliveries of perishable fruits and vegetables to the eastern United States possible.

Early farming in the state was primarily concentrated near the coast, and the Sacramento–San Joaquin River Delta in the Central Valley. Winter wheat was an early crop that grew well without irrigation if planted in the fall and harvested in the spring. By the 1880s extensive grape fields for producing wine were being planted in many areas in California. Many of the vine stock originally came from France and other parts of Europe. Starting in the late 1880s, Chinese workers and other laborers were used to construct hundreds of miles of levees throughout the Sacramento–San Joaquin River Delta's waterways in an effort to control flooding, reclaim and preserve flooded land that could be converted into farmland. This area now often grows extensive rice crops. Subsequent irrigation projects have brought many more parts of the Central Valley into productive agriculture use. The Central Valley Project, formed in 1935 to redistribute water from northern California to the Central valley and Southern California helped develop more of the Central Valley. Water for agricultural and municipal purposes was captured in the spring from snow melt in the Sierra Nevada (U.S.) and stored for later irrigation use with an extensive system of dams and canals. The even larger California State Water Project was formed in the 1950s, consisting of the California Aqueduct and its ancillary dams. The California Aqueduct, developed at the cost of several billion dollars, helps store and transport water from the Feather River Basin to agricultural and municipal users statewide. The Colorado River Aqueduct delivers water from the Colorado River to the Imperial Valley of California area and since 1905 the Los Angeles Aqueduct delivers water over from the Owens Valley to the city of Los Angeles. One of the state's most acute problems is its appetite for water. In the extensive fields of the Imperial Valley, irrigation is facilitated in part by the All-American Canal—part of the Colorado River Aqueduct project. Cutbacks in federally funded water projects in the 1970s and 80s led many cities to begin buying water from areas with a surplus; but political problems associated with water distribution continue. Ongoing challenges to develop a long-term plan to end surplus water withdrawals from the Colorado led the federal government to stop the release of surplus river water to the state in 2003.

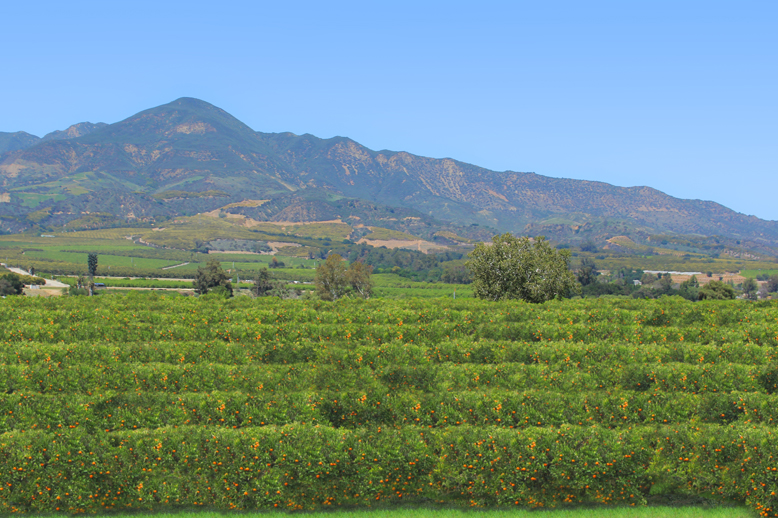
Orange Grove outside of Santa Paula

Agriculture is one of the prominent elements of the state's economy: California leads the nation in the production of fruits, vegetables, wines and nuts. The state's most valuable crops are cannabis, nuts, grapes, cotton, flowers, and oranges. California produces the major share of U.S. domestic wine. Dairy products contribute the single largest share of farm income. California's farms are highly productive as a result of good soil, a long growing season, the use of modern agricultural methods and extensive irrigation. Irrigation is critical since the long dry summers would not allow most crops to grow there--California Indians had almost no agriculture because of this. Extensive and expensive irrigation systems including furrow "gravity" irrigation, sprinkler and drip irrigation systems have been developed to supply the extensive irrigation needs of California. Illegal immigration to the United States has been traditionally drawn to the state, in part, because corporations face intense pressure to control labor costs by using illegal means to harvest California's extensive crops.

Top 30 publicly traded companies in California for 2022 according to revenues with State and U.S. rankings
State	Corporation	US
1	Apple	4
2	Alphabet	8
3	Chevron	10
4	Meta	31
5	Wells Fargo	47
6	Disney	48
7	Intel	62
8	HP Inc.	63
9	TD Synnex	64
10	Cisco	82
11	Qualcomm	98
12	Broadcom	123
13	Molina	126
14	Uber	127
15	Netflix	129
16	Salesforce	133
17	Visa	137
18	PayPal	148
19	Gilead Sciences	150
20	Nvidia	152
21	Amgen	154
22	Applied Materials	155
23	AMD	167
24	PG&E	180
25	Western Digital	221
26	Ross	223
27	Adobe	233
28	Block	234
29	Lam Research	240
30	Edison	241
Further information: List of California companies Source: Fortune/Patch

California's location along the Pacific coast and its rapidly growing population initially led to the constructions of major seaports at San Francisco in the San Francisco Bay area and inland ports at Sacramento, etc. The first paddle steamer, the SS California, arrived in the port of San Francisco on February 28, 1849, with over 400 passengers trying to get to the gold rush territory. It left New York City October 6, 1848, before the gold discoveries were verified and the gold rush truly started. Shipment of passengers and freight to Sacramento was accomplished by off-loading the cargoes and passengers onto paddle steamers for transit up the Sacramento River to Sacramento, Stockton, etc. As the population spread out and grew ports were established up and down the California coast with other major ports in Long Beach, Los Angeles and San Diego. The largest U.S. Naval base on the west coast is now in San Diego. (See: Maritime history of California for more information.) The state's shipping industry evolved to handle cargoes to and from California to Europe and the eastern United States and help support the growing international trade with South America, Asia and Oceania. During World War II, numerous military bases and various wartime industries were quickly established in the state to support the Pacific Ocean and Atlantic Ocean fleets—ships could use the Panama Canal to get from ocean to ocean. California led in the number of merchant ships built at the Kaiser shipyards in Richmond and the Los Angeles areas. Mare Island Naval Shipyard (now closed) in the San Francisco Bay built submarines as well as repaired many of the ships used by the U.S. Navy Pacific Fleet in World War II. The rapidly growing California aircraft industries was greatly expanded. Since then these defense connected industries have largely closed down or moved to cheaper areas in the U.S.

With Thomas Edison's invention of the Kinetoscope (early movie camera) in 1894, California would become a leader when "talkies" were introduced in the sound film movie industry. The idea of combining motion pictures with recorded sound is nearly as old as film itself, but because of the technical challenges involved, synchronized dialogue was only made practical in the late 1920s with the perfection of the Audion amplifier tube and the introduction of the Vitaphone system. After the release of The Jazz Singer in 1927, "talkies" became more and more commonplace. Within a decade, popular widespread production of silent films had ceased. Cheap land, good year-round climate and large natural spaces prompted the growing film industry to begin migrating to Southern California in the early part of the 20th century. The film patent wars of the early 20th century actually led to the spread of film companies across the U.S. Many worked with equipment for which they did not own the patent rights, and thus filming in New York was "dangerous"; it was too close to Edison's company headquarters, and to his agents which the company sent out to seize "illegal" cameras. By 1912, most major film companies had set up movie production facilities in Southern California near or in Los Angeles because of the region's favorable year-round weather and the rapidly growing supply of "talent" both before and behind the cameras. Since the 1920s California continues to be a major U.S. center for motion-picture shows, television shows, cartoons, and related entertainment industries, especially in Hollywood and Burbank areas.

Since 1945, manufacturing of electronic equipment, computers, machinery, transportation equipment, and metal products, has increased rapidly while aircraft and naval construction has largely ceased. Stanford University, its affiliates, and graduates played a major role in the development of California's electronics and high-tech industry. From the 1890s, Stanford University's leaders saw its mission as leading the development of the West and shaped the school accordingly. Regionalism helped align Stanford's interests with those of the Stanford area's high-tech firms for the first fifty years of Silicon Valley's development. During the 1940s and 1950s, Frederick Terman, as Stanford's dean of engineering and provost, encouraged faculty and graduates to start their own companies. He is credited with nurturing Hewlett-Packard, Varian Associates, Fairchild Semiconductor, Intel Corporation and later other high-tech firms such as Apple Inc., Google, etc. in what would become Silicon Valley that grew up around the Stanford campus. Despite the development of other high-tech economic centers throughout the United States and the world, Silicon Valley continues to be a leading hub for high-tech innovation and development, accounting for one-third of all of the venture capital investment in the United States. Geographically, Silicon Valley encompasses all of the Santa Clara Valley, the southern Peninsula, and the southern East Bay. A number of high-tech companies and small low-tech, often low-wage, companies are also located in Southern California.

Tourism is also an important part of California's economy. Yosemite National Park was established in 1890, followed by nine other national parks and seashores, as well as various other protected areas across California. Disneyland, established in 1955, and other theme parks draw millions of visitors each year.

California also pioneered numerous innovations in retailing during the mid-20th century, particularly fast food restaurants and credit cards. Nationwide fast food chains A&W Restaurants (1919), McDonald's (1940), Taco Bell (1961), and Panda Express (1983) were all founded in California. Visa Inc. (originally BankAmericard) was born from a 1958 experiment by Bank of America in Fresno, while MasterCard (originally Master Charge) was formed as the Interbank Card Association in 1966 by a group of California banks to compete against BankAmericard.

If the state were considered separately, it would rank as the fifth largest economy in the world, behind rest of the United States, China, Japan, and Germany as of 2017. The state recently overtook the United Kingdom to take the fifth spot. The U.S. Bureau of Economic Analysis reported that California's GDP was $2.751 trillion in 3rd quarter 2017.

== Sectors ==
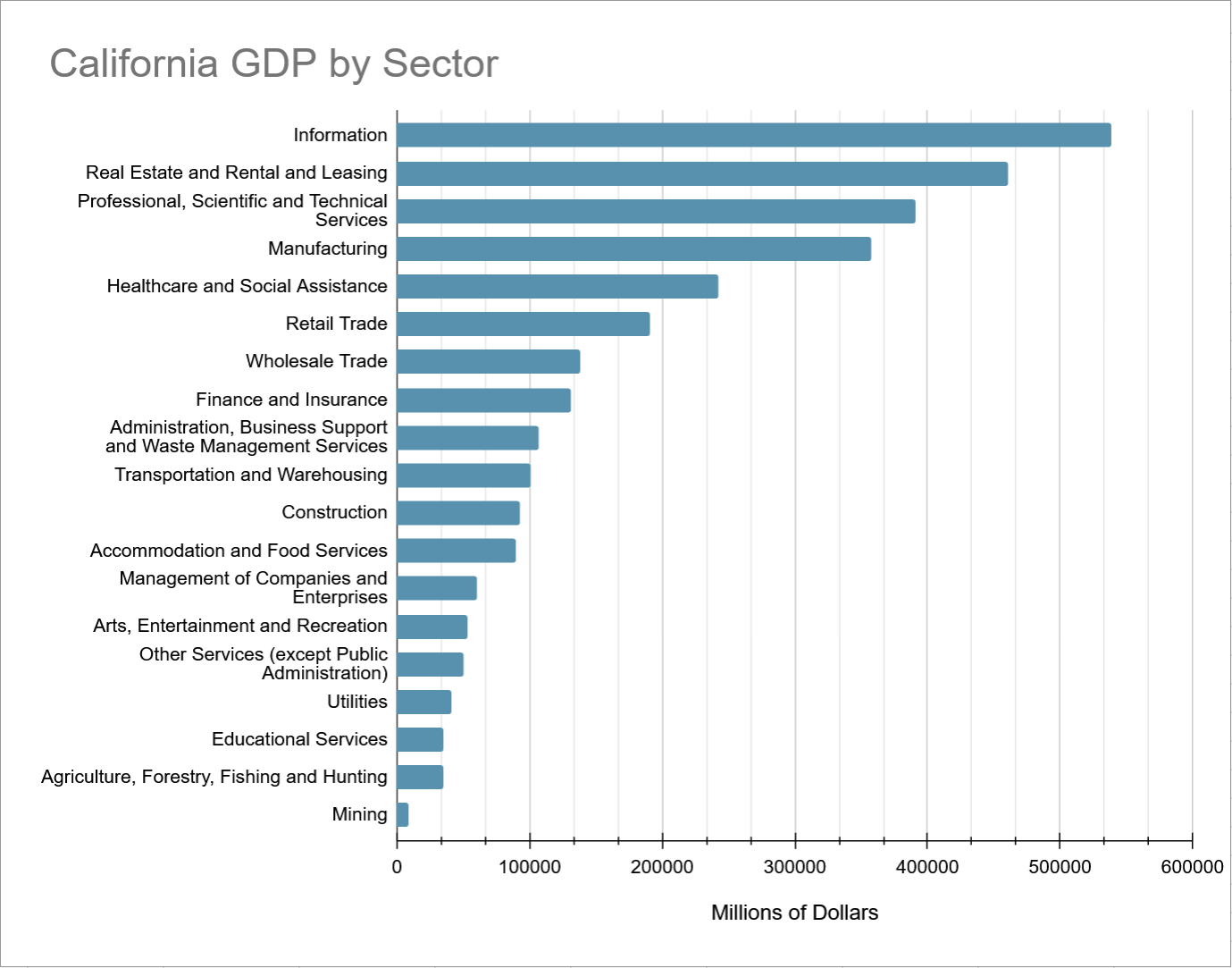
California GDP by Sector (2025)

California's largest sector by GDP in 2025 is Information at $538 billion dollars. The second and third largest sectors by GDP are Real Estate ($460 billion) and Professional Services ($391 billion). The Information sector includes some of the nation's largest technology and entertainment companies like Apple, Meta, Disney, and HP.

The largest employer in California is Government, with 2,705,400 employees in August 2025 which includes state and local employees.

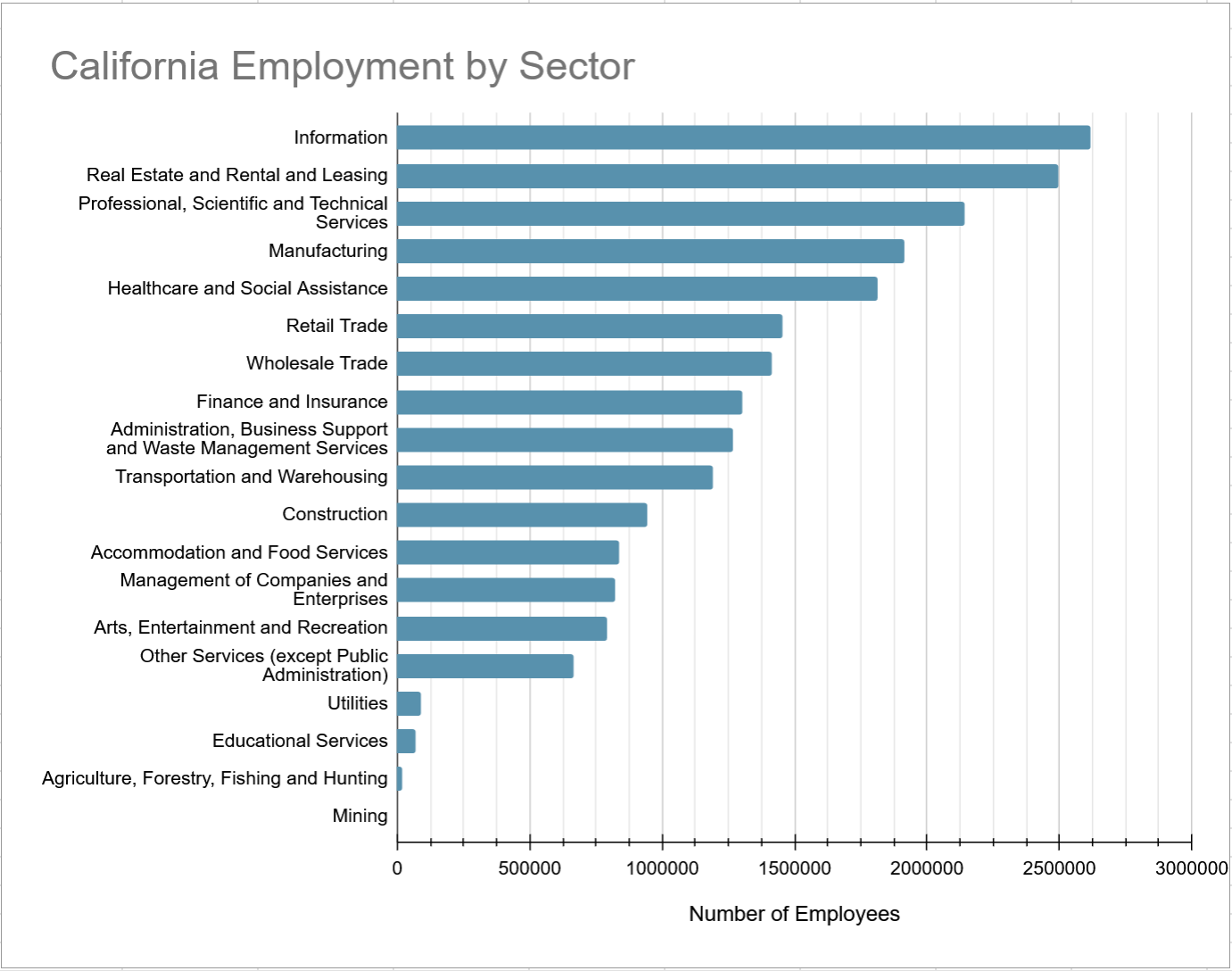
California Employment by Sector (2025)

The largest single employer is the University of California at 272,437 employees, followed by the state government at 247,446 employees.

California's largest sector by employees is Healthcare at 2.6 million employees, followed by Retail Trade (2.5 million employees) and Professional Services (2.1 million employees).

=== International trade and tourism ===
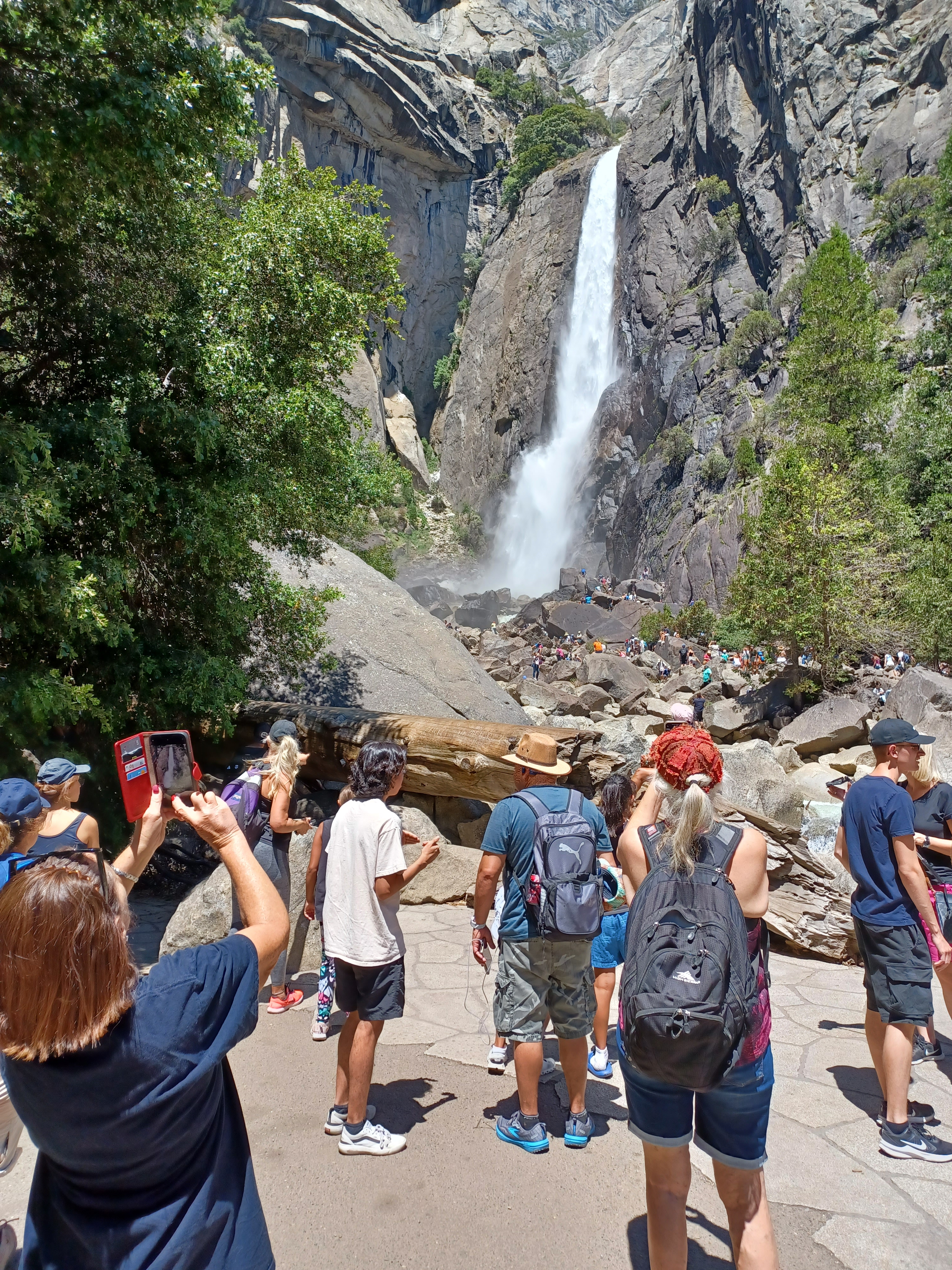
Tourists at Yosemite Falls

California has historically derived significant revenue from international trade and tourism. It is the most popular state to be visited by road trip. The state is ranked third among U.S. states in the volume of international visitors. However, the state's share of America's merchandise export trade has been steadily shrinking since 2000, from 15.4% to 11.1% in 2008. The exports of goods made in California totaled $134 billion in 2007. $48 billion of that total was computers and electronics, followed by transportation, non-electrical machinery, agriculture, and chemicals. California trade and exports translate into high-paying jobs for over one million Californians. According to the US Bureau of Economic Analysis (BEA), in 2005, foreign-controlled companies employed 542,600 California workers, the most of any state. Major sources of foreign investment in California in 2005 were Japan, the United Kingdom, Switzerland, France, and Germany. Foreign investment in California was responsible for 4.6 percent of the state's total private-industry employment in 2009. Total direct travel spending in California reached $96.7 billion in 2008, a 0.8% increase over the preceding year. Los Angeles County receives the most tourism in the state.

=== Information ===
As of 2022, there were 21,758 California firms in the Information sector with a total annual sales of $670 billion and an annual payroll of $182 billion.

==== Software Publishing ====
Major software publishers (per the NAICS industry classification system used by the US Office of Management and Budget) with headquarters in the state include Apple, HP, Intel, QUALCOMM, Block (formerly Square), and Adobe.

Apple Inc., headquartered in Cupertino and with over 164,000 employees worldwide, was the first company to be valued at over $1 trillion. Today the company is valued at $3.6 trillion and has an annual sales revenue of $391 billion. Apple's current corporate headquarters, called Apple Park, opened in 2017 and houses more than 12,000 employees. In July 2025, Apple announced a $500 million partnership with the owner of Mountain Pass mine in the Mojave Desert, MP Materials, to secure a US-based source of rare earth metals like neodymium.

HP Inc., headquartered in Palo Alto, is best known for its line of personal computers and printers. Today the company has 58,000 employees and an annual sales revenue of $53.5 billion. In 2025, HP Inc. announced layoffs of 4,000 to 6,000 jobs after a slump in consumer PC sales. The last layoff was in 2019 when the company cut 7,000 to 9,000 jobs.

Intel, headquartered in Santa Clara, is a microprocessor manufacturer with over 109,000 employees worldwide at the end of 2024 and an annual sales revenue of $53.1 billion. Intel plans to layoff over 500 California employees as part of CEO Lip-Bu Tan's effort to rightsize the company by cutting up to 20% of its workforce.

Qualcomm, headquartered in San Diego, is a wireless technology manufacturer with approximately 49,000 employees worldwide and an annual sales revenue of $38.9 billion. Qualcomm is a leading market player of 5G millimeter wave technology.

Block, Inc. (formerly Square, Inc.) is best known for its point-of-sale system Square and its digital wallet Cash App. The company employs approximately 11,000 employees and has an annual sales revenue of $24.1 billion. The company was formerly headquartered in San Francisco and now has no official headquarters, although its largest offices are located in Oakland.

Adobe Inc. is a software company headquartered in San Jose and best known for its image editing software Adobe Photoshop and its PDF editor Acrobat Reader. Adobe has approximately 30,000 employees and an annual sales revenue $21.5 billion.

=== Agriculture ===
Compared to other states, California has a large agriculture industry (including fruit, vegetables, dairy, and wine production), The total economic contribution is likely more than double this value (see below). Total exports of agricultural products amounted to approximately $22.5 billion in 2022.By way of comparison, California exported more agricultural products by air that year than 23 other states did by all modes of transport. Its agriculture is somewhat dependent on illegal immigrantion.

According to the California Department of Food and Agriculture, "California agriculture is a $42.6 billion dollar industry that generates at least $100 billion in related economic activity." The state's agricultural sales first exceeded $30 billion in 2004, making it more than twice the size of any other state's agriculture industry.

The state's almond industry produces the most export value of any farm product, with $4.5 billion in foreign sales in 2016. Dairy and dairy products ranked second to almonds with a total export value of $1.42 billion, a 24 percent increase over 2010. California leads the United States in strawberry production; due to its optimal climate and productive soil, the state is the source of over 80% of the nation's strawberry harvest.

=== Energy ===
Oil drilling has played a significant role in the development of the state. There have been major strikes in the Bakersfield, Long Beach, Los Angeles areas and off the California coast.

Solar power in California is also a large employer in the state. There are over 43,000 Californians working in the solar industry, primarily around the San Francisco Bay Area, Los Angeles, San Diego, and the Central Valley.

== Personal income ==
Per capita income was $88,447 in 2025, ranking 4th in the nation after D.C., Connecticut, and Massachusetts.

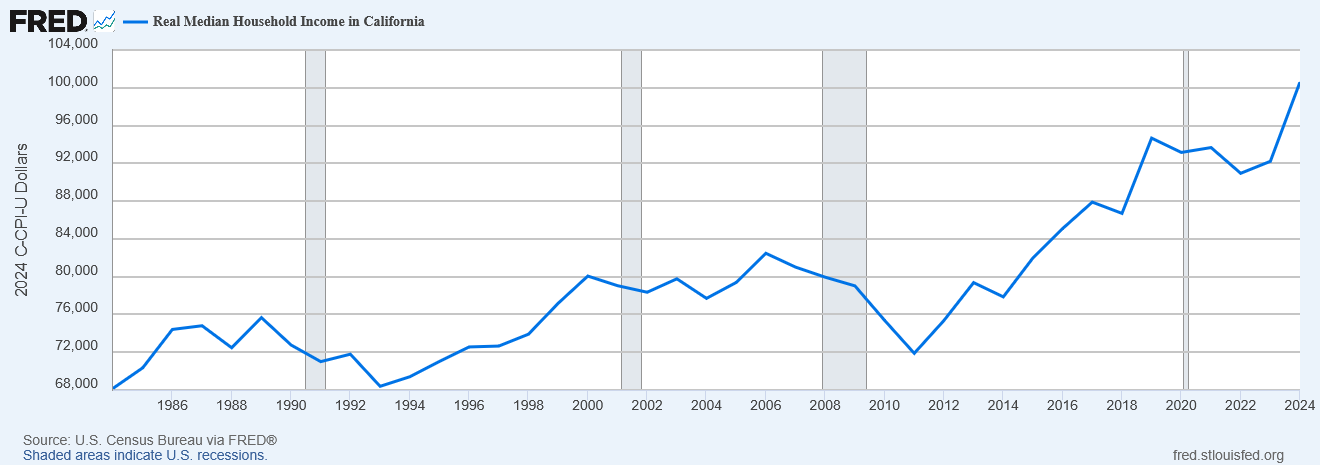
Real Median Household Income in California

According to the United States Census Bureau, in 2024 the median household income was $100,149 and the median earnings for full-time, year-round workers was $69,440. This is an increase of 24.5% for household income and 32.1% for earnings for full-time, year-round workers compared to 2019. The national median household income was $81,604. An estimated 21% of Californian households earn more than $200,000 annually.

The counties in California with the highest household incomes are Santa Clara ($168.2k), San Mateo ($160.7k), and Marin ($147.0k) counties. The counties with the lowest household incomes are Lake ($51.4k), Humboldt ($58.1k), and Imperial ($60.7k) counties.

Despite having one of the highest median incomes in the nation, Californian households struggle with a high cost of living. California electricity rates are the second-highest in the country and households with incomes under 200% of the Federal Poverty Level typical pay about 4.4% of their annual income on electricity bills.

California has a high income gap. In 2023, the highest-earning families earned an average of $336,000 while the lowest-earning families earned just $30,000. Only D.C. and Louisiana had wider income gaps.

=== Poverty ===
An estimated 11.8% of Californians live below the official poverty level in 2025. The Supplemental Poverty Rate was 17.7% in 2024. An estimated 13.5% of Californian households received food stamps in 2025.

Although California doesn't stand out from other states for the official poverty measure (ranked #23 highest in 2023), it's tied for highest with Louisiana for the supplemental poverty measure, primarily due to the high cost of living.

== Taxes ==
Taxes in California are collected by state and local governments through a number of tax categories. In total, for fiscal year 2022, California state and local governments together collected an average of $10,319 per capita from residents, the third highest per capita collections in the nation, with the nationwide average being $7,109. California does not have an estate tax or inheritance tax.

Sales tax: As of 2024, a 7.25% state sales tax is imposed on the sale of tangible goods. Unprepared food purchased in grocery stores, soap, medical devices, diapers, and feminine hygiene products are all excluded from sales tax. Local taxes are legislatively capped at an additional 2%, though because over 140 jurisdictions have exemptions to this cap, some cities have a sales tax as high as 11.25%. The average combined state and local sales tax rate is 8.85 percent. Use tax is imposed on the storage, use, or other consumption of tangible personal property purchased from a retailer.

Property tax: Property tax is imposed at a uniform 1% rate of assessed value with annual increases of assessed value restricted to an inflation factor, not to exceed 2% per year due to California's Proposition 13. It prohibits reassessment of a new base year value except in cases of (a) change in ownership, or (b) completion of new construction. People 55 or older can benefit from exemptions. Prop 13 applies equally to all real estate, residential and commercial—whether owned by individuals or corporations. For 2023, the effective property tax rate on owner-occupied housing value was 0.7%.

Income tax: California has a progressive personal income tax system, with rates which range from 1% to 13.3%. The 13.3% rate is the highest in the country, and applies to income over $1 million. Due to this progressivity the state's income tax collections are extremely dependent on high income earners; the top 10% of earners pay 75% of the state's total income tax revenue, (with the top 1% paying 33% and the top 0.1% paying 17%), while the bottom 90% of income earners pay 25%. California's corporate income tax is a flat tax with a rate of 8.84%. Banks and financial institutions are subject to a slightly higher rate of 10.84%.

Other taxes: The state also imposes payroll taxes for unemployment insurance, as well as the state's own disability insurance system. Gasoline is taxed at $0.71 / gallon (in 2025), and the cigarette excise tax is $2.87 / pack.

== Housing ==
According to the United States Census Bureau's 2024 American Community Survey, there are an estimated 14,877,017 housing units in California, of which 13,797,638, or about 92.7% are estimated to be occupied; this is above the national average rate of occupation of 90.5%. There are an estimated 8,444,064 single-family homes. Most housing units in California (52.1%) were built earlier than 1980.

Housing Inventory: Median Listing Price in California (US Dollars)

An estimated 7,701,876 housing units are owner-occupied, or about 55.8%, which is 9.5% below the national average. An estimated 6,095,762 housing units are renter-occupied. The median home value in California is $759,500, and the median mortgage is $3301 which is $966 above the national average. The median rent is $2104 which is $617 above the national average.

An estimated 61.7% of housing units in California have 2 or more vehicles. Most housing units are heated with utility gas (60.6%) or electricity (30.1%).

In 2023, California as a whole had a moderately cost-burdened renter rate of 54.1% and a severely cost-burdened renter rate of 29.2%, where moderately and severely cost-burdened means households pay more than 30% and 50% of their income for housing, respectively. The moderately cost-burdened renter rate for the entire US was 49.5%.

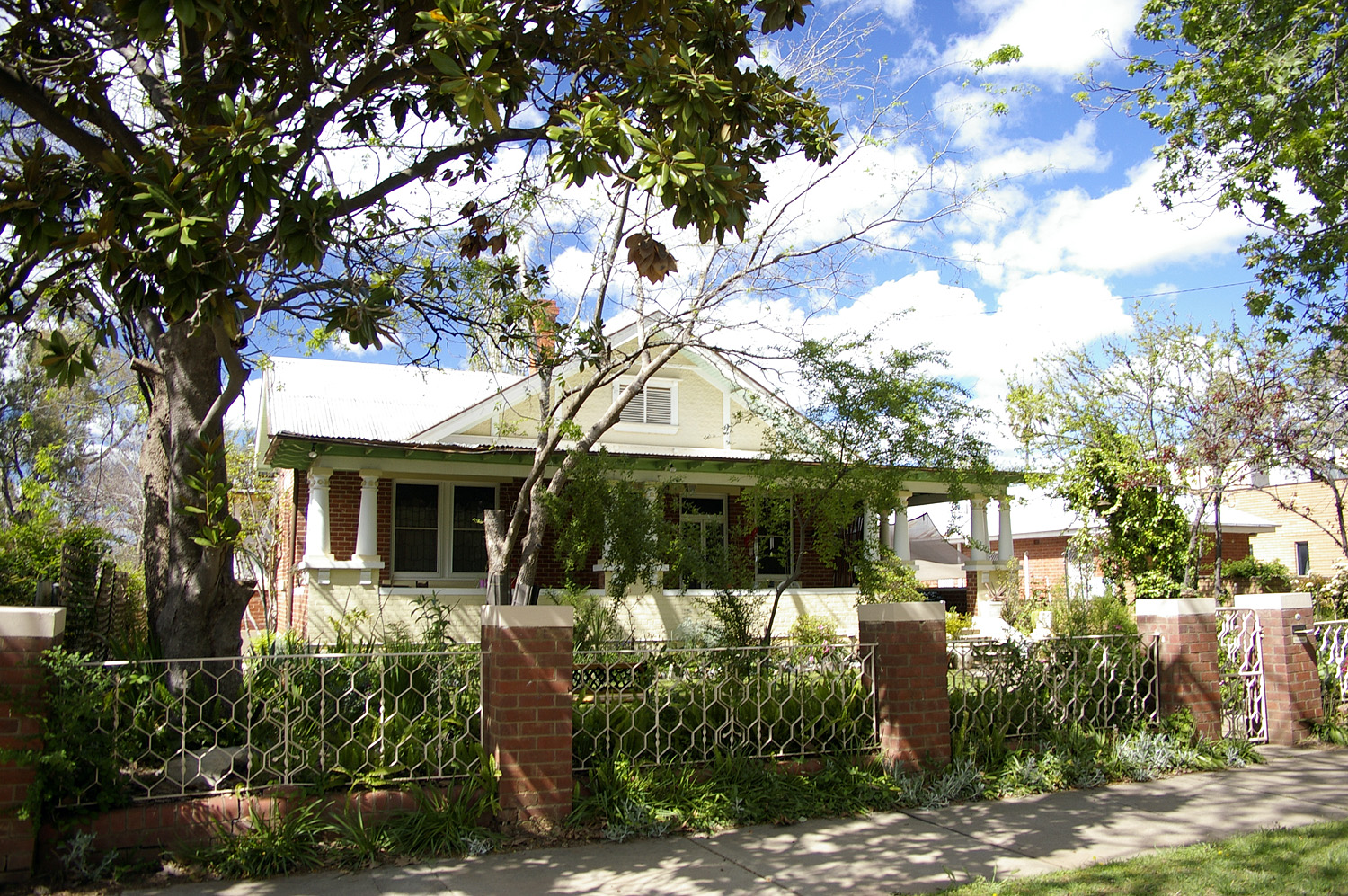
1920s Californian Bungalow style home

The Los Angeles–Long Beach combined statistical area (CSA) had a moderately cost-burdened renter rate of 56.4%, and the San Jose-San Francisco-Oakland CSA had a rate of 47.5%.

In 2023, the California metropolitan area with the highest median single-family home price is San Jose-Sunnyvale-Santa Clara at $2,020,000, followed by Anaheim-Santa Ana-Irvine at $1,450,000 and San Francisco-Oakland-Fremont at $1,320,000. The median single-family home price in the US in 2024 was $412,500.

The change from 2019 to 2025 in real home prices is highest in San Diego-Chula Vista-Carlsbad at 34.4%, followed by Riverside-San Bernardino-Ontario at 33.3% and Bakersfield-Delano at 32.6%. The change for the US as a whole was 29.0%.

=== Housing Crisis ===
This section is an excerpt from California Housing Shortage

Since about 1970, California has been experiencing an extended and increasing housing shortage, such that by 2018, California ranked 49th among the states of the U.S. in terms of housing units per resident. In 2025, the shortage was estimated at 3 million housing units. In 2018, experts said that California needs to double its current rate of housing production (85,000 units per year) to keep up with expected population growth and prevent prices from further increasing, and needs to quadruple the current rate of housing production over the next seven years in order for prices and rents to decline.

Strong economic growth created hundreds of thousands of new jobs (which increases demand for housing) while NIMBY-led restrictions stymied new housing. From 2010 to 2020 statewide population grew 6.1% while housing supply rose by just 4.7%. In California's coastal urban areas, (where the majority of job growth has occurred since the Great Recession), the disparity is greater: in the Bay Area, seven times as many jobs were created as housing units. By 2024, this resulted in the median price of a California home being over 2.1 times the median U.S. price. As a result, less than a third of Californians can afford a median priced home (nationally, slightly more than half can), 6 percentage points more residents are in poverty than would be with average housing costs (20% vs. 14%), homelessness per capita is the third highest in the nation, the state's economy is suppressed by $150–400 billion annually (5-14%), and long commutes.

=== Homelessness ===
This section is an excerpt from Homelessness in California

In January 2024, at least 187,084 people were experiencing homelessness in California, according to the United States Department of Housing and Urban Development. This is 0.48% of California's population, one of the highest per capita rates in the nation.

California has the highest percentage of unsheltered homeless people among all U.S. states, with two-thirds of its homeless population sleeping on the streets, in encampments, or in their cars. Nearly one in four homeless people in the U.S., and 45% of unsheltered homeless people, live in California. Many sheltered homeless people are insecurely sheltered: 90% of homeless adults in California spent at least one night without shelter in a six-month period. A statewide housing shortage drives the homelessness crisis. A 2022 study found that differences in per capita homelessness rates across the United States are not due to differing rates of mental illness, drug addiction, or poverty, but to differences in the cost of housing. West Coast cities including San Francisco, Los Angeles, and San Diego have homelessness rates five times as high as areas with much lower housing costs like Arkansas, West Virginia, and Detroit, even though the latter locations have high burdens of opioid addiction and poverty. California has the second lowest number of housing units per capita, and an estimated shortage of one million homes that are affordable to the lowest income renters. Another 2022 study found that moderate decreases in rents would significantly reduce homelessness. A 2023 study published by the University of California, San Francisco also found that the high cost of housing was the greatest obstacle to reducing homelessness.

== See also ==
- California locations by per capita income
- California unemployment statistics
- 2008–10 California budget crisis
- List of country subdivisions by GDP over USD 100 billions
- List of US state economies
