= California unemployment statistics =

The following is a list of California unemployment statistics.

Many of the counties with the lowest unemployment rates had relatively high levels of income. They were also located in Northern California, with two exceptions: Orange and San Luis Obispo counties. The counties with the highest unemployment rates were generally located in inland areas and had lower levels of income.

Unemployment rate has reached 12.4 percent in 2010 which is highest recorded from 1976. Unemployment rates in California reached historic lows in 2000 and 2006. Unemployment rates in California were relatively low during the early 2000s but increased drastically in late 2000s

== Statewide unemployment ==
Data released December 13, 2017 for November 2017.

Population in labor force	19,393,427
Population employed	18,509,133
Population unemployed	884,294
Unemployment rate	4.6%

== Unemployment by county ==
Data released March 7, 2014 for January 2014, except population data (released 2012).

County	Population	Labor force	Employed	Unemployed	Unemp. rate (%)
Alameda	1,494,876	779,100	726,500	52,600	6.7
Alpine	1,167	390	350	40	10.7
Amador	38,244	15,700	14,170	1,530	9.8
Butte	219,309	104,500	94,100	10,500	10.0
Calaveras	45,794	19,030	17,090	1,940	10.2
Colusa	21,297	11,040	8,180	2,860	25.9
Contra Costa	1,037,817	537,700	500,100	37,600	7.0
Del Norte	28,561	10,920	9,670	1,260	11.5
El Dorado	179,878	89,100	81,900	7,200	8.1
Fresno	920,623	446,800	386,000	60,800	13.6
Glenn	28,027	12,880	11,210	1,670	13.0
Humboldt	133,585	57,600	52,700	4,900	8.5
Imperial	171,343	80,500	62,800	17,700	22.0
Inyo	18,457	8,930	8,190	740	8.3
Kern	829,254	393,700	345,400	48,300	12.3
Kings	152,335	59,000	50,200	8,800	14.9
Lake	64,392	26,710	23,550	3,160	11.8
Lassen	35,001	12,690	11,240	1,450	11.4
Los Angeles	9,787,747	4,930,500	4,487,800	442,700	9.0
Madera	149,611	68,500	60,300	8,200	12.0
Marin	250,666	142,400	135,700	6,700	4.7
Mariposa	18,290	9,230	8,270	970	10.5
Mendocino	87,525	43,080	39,730	3,340	7.8
Merced	253,606	112,900	94,900	18,000	15.9
Modoc	9,587	3,560	3,100	460	13.0
Mono	14,016	8,410	7,770	640	7.6
Monterey	411,385	215,400	187,000	28,300	13.2
Napa	135,377	77,300	72,300	5,000	6.4
Nevada	98,392	49,870	46,240	3,630	7.3
Orange	2,989,948	1,615,400	1,521,900	93,500	5.8
Placer	343,554	178,500	165,900	12,500	7.0
Plumas	20,192	9,040	7,760	1,290	14.2
Riverside	2,154,844	957,000	866,300	90,700	9.5
Sacramento	1,408,480	677,300	621,400	55,900	8.2
San Benito	54,873	27,300	23,900	3,400	12.6
San Bernardino	2,023,452	870,200	788,100	82,200	9.4
San Diego	3,060,849	1,588,400	1,477,400	111,000	7.0
San Francisco	797,983	488,300	462,600	25,700	5.3
San Joaquin	680,277	295,800	256,800	39,000	13.2
San Luis Obispo	267,871	140,500	131,800	8,700	6.2
San Mateo	711,622	404,500	384,500	19,900	4.9
Santa Barbara	419,793	220,400	204,500	16,000	7.2
Santa Clara	1,762,754	928,200	871,300	57,000	6.1
Santa Cruz	259,402	148,100	131,600	16,400	11.1
Shasta	177,231	81,000	72,300	8,700	10.7
Sierra	3,277	1,420	1,240	190	13.1
Siskiyou	44,687	17,970	15,290	2,680	14.9
Solano	411,620	216,400	198,900	17,500	8.1
Sonoma	478,551	260,600	244,400	16,100	6.2
Stanislaus	512,469	238,200	206,600	31,600	13.3
Sutter	94,192	41,200	34,500	6,700	16.2
Tehama	62,985	25,270	22,430	2,840	11.3
Trinity	13,711	4,930	4,320	610	12.4
Tulare	436,234	205,300	174,100	31,100	15.2
Tuolumne	55,736	23,940	21,620	2,320	9.7
Ventura	815,745	432,100	399,700	32,400	7.5
Yolo	198,889	99,700	89,100	10,600	10.6
Yuba	71,817	26,500	22,600	3,900	14.5

== Historical statewide unemployment rates ==
The unemployment rates in this table are annual averages without seasonal adjustment. The 1976-1989 rates are based on the March 2004 benchmark and were last updated April 26, 2005. The 1990-2012 rates are based on the March 2006 benchmark.

Year	Labor force	Employed	Unemployed	U3 unemp. rate (%)	U6 unemp. rate (%)
2013	18,596,800	16,933,300	1,663,500	8.9	17.3
2012	18,494,900	16,560,300	1,934,500	10.5	19.3
2011	18,103,800	15,974,800	2,129,000	11.8	21.1
2010	18,176,200	15,916,300	2,259,900	12.4	22.1
2009	18,204,200	16,141,500	2,062,700	11.3	21.1
2008	18,191,000	16,883,400	1,307,600	7.2	13.4
2007	17,928,700	16,970,200	958,500	5.3	9.9
2006	17,686,700	16,821,300	865,400	4.9	9.1
2005	17,544,800	16,592,200	952,600	5.4	9.7
2004	17,444,400	16,354,800	1,089,700	6.2	11.0
2003	17,390,700	16,200,100	1,190,600	6.8	11.7
2002	17,343,600	16,180,800	1,162,800	6.7	
2001	17,152,100	16,220,000	932,100	5.4	
2000	16,857,600	16,024,300	833,200	4.9	
1999	16,430,600	15,566,900	863,700	5.3	
1998	16,166,900	15,203,700	963,200	6.0	
1997	15,792,500	14,780,800	1,011,700	6.4	
1996	15,435,900	14,303,500	1,132,400	7.3	
1995	15,263,600	14,062,400	1,201,200	7.9	
1994	15,271,000	13,953,900	1,317,200	8.6	
1993	15,264,500	13,808,300	1,456,200	9.5	
1992	15,309,800	13,874,200	1,435,600	9.4	
1991	15,105,400	13,931,700	1,173,700	7.8	
1990	15,168,500	14,294,100	874,400	5.8	
1989	14,517,400	13,770,600	746,800	5.2	
1988	14,134,900	13,388,300	746,600	5.3	
1987	13,744,000	12,943,400	800,700	5.8	
1986	13,334,500	12,434,200	900,300	6.8	
1985	12,964,400	12,030,500	933,900	7.2	
1984	12,626,500	11,643,400	983,100	7.8	
1983	12,292,500	11,083,700	1,208,800	9.8	
1982	12,150,300	10,931,100	1,219,200	10.0	
1981	11,827,700	10,947,700	880,000	7.4	
1980	11,587,800	10,791,400	796,400	6.9	
1979	11,278,900	10,573,500	705,400	6.3	
1978	10,913,900	10,132,800	781,200	7.2	
1977	10,383,400	9,518,000	865,400	8.4	
1976	9,888,100	8,979,800	908,400	9.2	

== See also ==
- Economy of California
- List of U.S. states by unemployment rate
- Unemployment in the United States
