= Magnequench =

American magnet materials company

- Company type: Private
- Industry: Advanced materials
- Founded: 1986; 40 years ago
- Defunct: August 31, 2005; 20 years ago
- Fate: Sold by General Motors in 1995 to a consortium led by Sextant Group with Beijing San Huan New Material High-Tech and China National Non-Ferrous Metals
- Successor: Neo Material Technologies
- Headquarters: Anderson, Indiana, U.S.
- Products: Neodymium–iron–boron magnets Magnetic powders
- Parent: General Motors (1986–1995)

Magnequench was an American manufacturer of neodymium magnets and magnetic materials based in Anderson, Indiana.

It is often discussed in U.S. political debates over globalization and rare-earth supply chains after GM sold it in 1995 to a consortium involving Chinese investors and its Indiana operations were subsequently shifted overseas. In 2005, Magnequench merged with AMR Technologies to form Neo Material Technologies.

== History ==
The origins of Magnequench lay in the early 1980s, when General Motors and Sumitomo Special Metals separately developed powerful neodymium-based permanent magnets. Under the Magnequench name, GM opened a factory in Anderson, Indiana, in 1986.

In 1995, GM sold Magnequench for US$70 million to Sextant Group, Beijing San Huan New Material High-Tech, and China National Non-Ferrous Metals. It was part of GM's effort to divest non-core operations.

After the sale, Magnequench expanded through acquisitions and overseas investment. It acquired other magnet producers, including GA Powders and UGIMAG's Valparaiso plant, while also building factories abroad The company remained profitable for a time, but the market weakened in 2000 and Magnequench announced the closure of its Anderson plant. Its Valparaiso, Indiana, facility was later shut as the company exited magnet manufacturing in Indiana.

In 2005, Magnequench combined with Toronto-based AMR Technologies and the merged company became Neo Material Technologies.

In 2012, Molycorp acquired Neo Material Technologies in a US$1.3 billion cash-and-share deal.

== Legacy ==
Magnequench became a recurring reference point in American debates over outsourcing, industrial policy, and dependence on Chinese rare-earth supply chains. As of 2025, the United States still had no large domestic makers of neodymium magnets at the time MP Materials began trial production in Texas.
