= Vulcan Elements =

American rare earth magnet manufacturer

Coordinates: 35°55′46.3116″N 78°52′20.5212″W

- Type: Private
- Industry: Rare earth magnets
- Founded: 2023; 3 years ago
- Headquarters: Research Triangle Park, North Carolina, U.S.
- Key people: John Maslin (CEO and founder); Jake Bowles (COO); Piotr Kulik (CTO); Scott Glover (CCO)
- Products: Neodymium magnets
- Production output: 10 metric tons (2025)
- Number of employees: 30 (2025)
- Website: vulcanelements.com

Vulcan Elements is a startup manufacturer of rare earth magnets located in Durham, North Carolina.

In November 2025, the Pentagon's Office of Strategic Capital under the second Donald Trump administration granted the company the largest loan it had ever made, at $620 million. The deal raised conflict of interest questions, as 1789 Capital, a firm backed by Donald Trump Jr. had just in August 2025 invested heavily into the small, two-year old company. In contrast to the funding decisions by the Pentagon at the time, the decision to initiate the loan was not made by the Pentagon, but by Peter Navarro, a top aide in the Trump administration and a close friend of Trump Jr.'s.

== Production ==
Vulcan Elements currently produces sintered neodymium magnets. As of October 2025, its production capacity is around 10 metric tons per year.

== History ==
Vulcan Elements was founded in Boston in 2023 by former U.S. Navy officer and nuclear propulsion lab financial manager John Maslin, alongside Piotr Kulik, with the intention of competing with rare earth magnet manufacturers based in China. Maslin was studying at Harvard University when he started the business.

The company opened its first manufacturing facility on March 31, 2025. The opening of the plant was attended by academic, political, and military leaders, including Leonardo Williams, Pat Harrigan, Chris Miller, Nadia Schadlow, Josh Stein, and Ted Budd.

=== Record loan by the Pentagon ===
In August 2025, the company raised $65 million from private investors such as Altimeter Capital, One Investment Management, and 1789 Capital. It also secured orders and a multimillion dollar contract from the Pentagon. In November 2025, the Pentagon announced that its Office of Strategic Capital had awarded a $620 million dollar loan to Vulcan Elements, and that the Department of Commerce had an additional $50 million in equity. The Pentagon said that the $620 million dollar loan was funded by the One Big Beautiful Bill Act, and that the $50 million investment used funds provided by the 2022 CHIPS and Science Act. Vulcan Elements said the money would go to increasing their production capacity to 10,000 metric tons per year.

The deal raised conflict of interest questions related to Trump Jr.'s relationship with the second Donald Trump administration. In contrast to other companies that the Pentagon was considering funding at the time, it was the Trump administration that specifically requested that Vulcan Elements be funded. Investigative journalism by ProPublica revealed that it was Peter Navarro, a top aide to Trump and a friend of Trump Jr.'s, who made the request that Vulcan Elements be funded, just three months after Trump Jr. invested in the company. According to ProPublica's reporting, the Trump administration requested that the Pentagon move unusually swiftly on the loan to Vulcan Elements. Navarro and Trump Jr. are close friends, with the latter visiting Navarro in prison related to his role in the January 6th attack on the Capitol.

Neither 1789 Capital nor Vulcan Elements have disclosed what the precise stake of 1789 Capital is in Vulcan Elements. After the Pentagon loan, the valuation of Vulcan Elements increased from $200 million to $2 billion. The founders of Vulcan Elements said they received no political favoritism. Trump Jr. has said that he no played on role in the deal between the Pentagon and the company.

== Key people ==
John Maslin is the CEO and founder. Piotr Kulik is CTO. Scott Glover is CCO. Joe Croteau is vice president for research and development. Jonah Glick-Unterman is chief of staff. Jake Bowles is COO.

== Supply chain ==
Vulcan Elements aims to source its materials and equipment exclusively from companies that are based in the United States or allies, and whose supply chains do not involve business entities based in China. Companies in their supply chain include ReElement Technologies in Indiana, Consarc in New Jersey, and Energy Fuels in Denver, Colorado.

== Facilities ==
The company's primary facility for both manufacturing and research and development (R&D) is located in the Research Triangle Park in North Carolina. Around 30 employees work there. The facility interior encompasses 21,000 sq ft (2,000 m^{2}) and is equipped with a Consarc strip casting furnace. Its process is validated by the Ames National Laboratory.

Vulcan Elements plans to construct a new magnet factory in Benson, North Carolina, a small town about 40 minutes outside of Raleigh and about 30 minutes from Fort Bragg. This new location is expected to create around 1,000 jobs in the area. They chose North Carolina as the location of the new factory in part because of financial incentives from the state government, including payroll tax breaks and subsidized workforce training through the state's Job Development Investment Grant. Johnston Community College also received a $3.6 million dollar Golden LEAF Foundation grant to train new employees at the company's Advanced Manufacturing Training Facility in Four Oaks, North Carolina, starting in summer 2026, to prepare for the launch of the factory in Benson.

== See also ==
- Applied Magnetics Corporation
- Boom Technology
- China–United States trade war
- Collins Aerospace
- Economy of North Carolina
- Enpro Industries
- Graham Magnetics
- MP Materials
- National High Magnetic Field Laboratory
- Neo Performance Materials
- Rare-earth element
- Rea Magnet Wire Company
- USA Rare Earth
- Wolfspeed
