= Pittsburg-Weir Coalfield =

Coordinates: 37.45°N 94.76°W

The Pittsburg-Weir Coalfield, also known as Weir-Pittsburg Coalfield and Cherokee Coalfield, is a coalfield located in Cherokee and Crawford counties in the southeast corner of Kansas.

The first underground shaft mine was built in the region in 1874 near Scammon. Prior to that, there was scattered small-scale drift mining and surface mining of coal, but the construction of the first shaft mine ushered in an era which eventually led to as many as 290 significant mines and numerous other small ("dinky") mines in the two counties. The most active period of mining in the region was 1890-1910, and most of the coal camps were dismantled by the 1930s or 1940s. Mechanized strip mining overtook underground mining in output in 1931, and that combined with competition from eastern coal led to a demise in importance of underground mining in the region.

== Santa Fe Mining Company ==
A major mining disaster took place November 9, 1888, in shaft 2 of the Santa Fe Mining Company mine near Frontenac, Kansas, when 150 miners lost their lives in an explosion.

== Pittsburg & Midway Coal Company ==
One of the oldest continuously running coal companies in the United States was the Pittsburg & Midway Coal Company, founded in Pittsburg, Kansas, in 1885. It lasted under that name even after its move to Denver, Colorado , when the Kansas mines closed, until September 2007, when Chevron which owned the company, merged it with its Molycorp Inc. coal mining division to form Chevron Mining, thus ending the Pittsburg corporate name.

The name Pittsburg & Midway Coal Company was purchased from Chevron in 2008 and refounded in Midway Kansas. P&M owns mines in Oklahoma, Texas, Kentucky and Ohio.
