= Brook Mine =

Rare earth materials mine

- Location in Wyoming
- Location: Ranchester, Sheridan County, Wyoming, United States; 44.8981°N 107.0508°W
- Products: Coal, Rare-earth elements
- Company: Ramaco Resources
- Website: ramacoresources.com
- Acquired: 2011

Brook Mine is a mine near Sheridan, Wyoming, operated by Ramaco Resources. Originally prospected for coal, the mine was found to be holding rare earth metals, becoming the first new rare earth mine in the United States in seventy years after its opening in July 2025.

== History ==
Ramaco Resources acquired the land in 2011 from Pittston Coal, an entity owned by Brink's, for $2 million. Early plans for Brook Mine included utilizing longwall mining, as opposed to open-pit mining (a more common practice in the area), supplying coal to power plants for energy generation. Around that same time, coal was becoming heavily scrutinized, leading to the company stalling on plans to open a mine, going on to survey the land for additional options.

The first permit application for Brook Mine was submitted to the state of Wyoming in 2014. The Wyoming Environmental Quality Council (EQC), an independent review board, approved a proposal for the mine in late September 2016. In the plan, Ramaco sought to build the mine, a research laboratory, and an industrial park in the Tongue River Valley. The proposal was opposed by Lighthouse Resources (a mining company), its subsidiary Big Horn Coal Company, the Powder River Basin Resource Council, and some local residents of the area. Nearly a year later, the EQC rejected the company's proposal in August 2017, voting four to one against the permit application. The rejection was challenged in court, resulting in Judge Catherine Rogers ruling that EQC did not have the authority to reject the permit, and its opinion on the permit "should have been interpreted as counsel to the Department of Environmental Quality's (DEQ) director, not the final decision." The Wyoming DEQ approved the permit in July 2020, placing twelve conditions on its approval. The permit allowed Ramaco to develop Brook Mine and begin mining thermal coal, which is estimated to yield 17.3 million tons of the material over nearly four decades. The permit was renewed for another five-year period in 2025.

=== Innovation of Carbon Advancement of Materials research center (iCAM) ===
Ramaco delayed mining until it completed the construction of its Innovation of Carbon Advancement of Materials research center (iCAM), which initially began in 2018, with the purpose of hosting "researchers from national laboratories, universities, private research groups and strategic manufacturing organizations" to conduct research and development on carbon found in coal, with the goal of creating carbon-based products. The company partnered with other research institutions and companies, including the National Energy Technology Laboratory, Oak Ridge National Laboratory, the Western Research Institute, and TerraPower. Ramaco has been the recipient of US Department of Energy grants to process coal into carbon-based products, like carbon fiber. The facility undertook a project to create a synthetic graphite using coal as a base material.

=== Rare earth discovery ===
In May 2023, rare earth elements were discovered at Brook Mine. Ramaco, through a partnership with National Energy Technology Laboratory (NETL) researchers, reviewed eighteen months of core drilling and chemical analysis from an assessment of 4,500 acres of the 15,800 acre area, describing the site as "what could be the largest unconventional deposit of REEs discovered in the United States." The assessment was made using an artificial intelligence model utilized by the NETL. At the time of its disovery, the mine ranked among the highest relative concentrations of magnetic rare earths materials, such as terbium, dysprosium, neodymium and praseodymium. In addition, gallium, scandium, and germanium were also found amongst the elements. Ramaco also worked with the University of North Dakota, which processed lignite, and the University of Kentucky, which ran tests to determine best practices of rare earth material conversions.

In 2024, Ramaco hired Swiss-based SGS and Colorado-based Hazen Research to assist in the development of the rare earths project based out of Brook Mine.

Ramaco Resources broke ground on Brook Mine in July 2025, making it the first new coal mine in Wyoming in fifty years and the first new rare earth mine in the United States in seventy years. Energy Secretary Chris Wright, Wyoming Governor Mark Gordon, the Wyoming congressional delegation, and former West Virginia Senator Joe Manchin were in attendance for the groundbreaking.

In August 2025, Ramaco Resources raised approximately $200 million for the funding of Brook Mine and its operations through an underwritten public offering of class A common stock.

==== Strategic Critical Minerals Terminal ====
In October 2025, Ramaco announced the development of the Strategic Critical Minerals Terminal, a "hub for stockpiling, processing and storing key minerals". Previously in the year, Ramaco received a $6.1 million grant from the state of Wyoming to build a rare earth and critical minerals processing plant. The plant was designed by the Fluor Corporation, who previously designed a rare earths processing plant for the Australian company, Iluka Resources.

== See also ==
- China–United States trade war
- Mining in the United States
- USA Rare Earth
- Mountain Pass Rare Earth Mine
