= USA Rare Earth =

American rare-earth mining company

USA Rare Earth, Inc.
- Type: Public
- Traded as: Nasdaq: USAR
- Industry: Mining
- Founded: 2019
- Founder: Pini Althaus
- Headquarters: Stillwater, Oklahoma, United States
- Key people: Thras Moraitis (CEO); Barbara Humpton (former CEO); Joshua Ballard (former CEO); Tom Schneberger(former CEO)
- Products: Rare earth elements and neodymium-iron-boron magnets
- Revenue: ▲US$1.64 million (2025)
- Net income: ▼ −US$298 million (2025)
- Website: www.usare.com

USA Rare Earth, Inc. (NASDAQ: USAR) is an American mining and manufacturing company specializing in the extraction, processing, and production of rare-earth elements (REEs), particularly heavy rare-earth elements (making up 70% of REE production), and permanent magnets. Headquartered in Stillwater, Oklahoma, USA Rare Earth is working on developing a domestic supply chain for REE magnets, used in industries such as defense, electric vehicles, renewable energy, consumer electronics, and advanced manufacturing.

== History ==
USA Rare Earth was founded in 2019 by Pini Althaus. The company initially focused on acquiring and developing domestic US resources to support a "mine-to-magnet" strategy, encompassing mining, separation, metal production, and magnet manufacturing.

By early 2025, the company achieved its initial milestones, including the production of high-purity dysprosium oxide from Round Top ore and the opening of an Innovations Lab in Stillwater for prototype magnet development. In January 2025, USA Rare Earth produced its first batch of sintered neodymium-iron-boron (NdFeB) magnets at the lab, marking a step toward commercial-scale output.

In September 2025, USA Rare Earth announced a binding agreement to acquire Less Common Metals, a UK-based rare earth metals and alloys manufacturer, for $100 million in cash plus 6.74 million shares of USAR common stock.

In 2025, the company secured $75 million via a private investment in public equity arrangement to support its magnet manufacturing project and operations.

On January, 2026, the Trump Administration announced a US$1.6 billion debt-and-equity investment in the company acquiring a 10% stake in the company aimed at growing domestic mining and production of REEs.

On July 20, 2026, the company announced that Barbara Humpton would retire from her position as CEO effective October 1, 2026. Thras Moraitis was named the new CEO as of Octorber 1, 2026.

== Serra Verde Group Aquisition ==
On April 20, 2026, USA Rare Earth announced the terms of a definitive agreement to acquire the Serra Verde Group for $2.8 billion. Serra Verde main asset, the Pela Ema mine in Goiás, Brazil, is the only scaled producer of all four magnetic rare earth elements outside of Asia: Neodymium (Nd), Praseodymium (Pr), Dysprosium (Dy), and Terbium (Tb).

The transaction is a part-equity part-cash agreement where legacy Serra Verde investors will retain a 34% equity stake in the combined entity and will receive an additional extra $300 million in cash.

The Pela Ema mine is a strategic asset for the rare earth supply chain outside Asia, serving as a high-quality source of all four magnetic rare earth elements. The site is located in a formation of ionic clay rich in both Light Rare Earth Elements (LREE) and Heavy Rare Earth Elements (HREE). Ionic clay deposits are significantly easier and more cost-effective to mine, as they are generally located near to the surface and do not require blasting, crushing, or milling to reach the minerals. This profile differentiates the Pela Ema mine from other USA Rare Earth projects in North America which consist of rhyolite deposits, a volcanic rock that is significantly more energy-intensive to mine.

Regarding the transaction, USA Rare Earth CEO Barbara Humpton stated: "The acquisition of Serra Verde represents a transformational step in delivering on our ambition to build a global champion… Serra Verde’s Pela Ema mine is a one-of-a-kind asset. By combining Serra Verde’s world-class operations with our processing, separation, metallization, and magnet-making capabilities, we are advancing our goal of creating a fully integrated platform that will serve as a cornerstone of global rare earth supply security for decades to come,” said Barbara Humpton, CEO of USA Rare Earth."

== See also ==
- MP Materials
- Ramaco Resources
- Rare-earth elements
- Vulcan Elements
- Mining
- Gina Rinehart
