= Ramaco Resources =

American mining company

Ramaco Resources, Inc.
- Type: Public
- Traded as: Nasdaq: METC (Class A); Nasdaq: METCB (Class B)
- Industry: Mining
- Founded: October 2016
- Key people: Randall W. Atkins (chairman and chief executive officer)
- Products: Metallurgical coal
- Website: ramacoresources.com

Ramaco Resources, Inc. is an American mining company focused on the development, operation, and sale of metallurgical coal. The company is also currently exploring rare-earth elements and related products at its Brook Mine property in Wyoming.

The company produces metallurgical coal from mines in southern West Virginia and southwestern Virginia used primarily for steelmaking. It is headquartered in Lexington, Kentucky. It is traded publicly on the Nasdaq Global Select Market under the ticker symbols METC and METCB.

== History ==
Ramaco Resources (formerly Ramaco Development, LLC) was founded in 2015 by Randall W. Atkins and others. It was initially formed in Delaware in as a mineral acquisition and development company.

Ramaco went public as an IPO in February 2017 with six million shares priced at $13.50 per share.

== See also ==
- Coal mining in the United States
- Rare-earth element
- List of coal mines in the United States
- MP Materials
- USA Rare Earth
