= Neo Performance Materials =

American mining corporation

- Company type: Public
- Traded as: TSX: NEO
- ISIN: CA64046G1063
- Industry: Mining
- Founded: 2010
- Headquarters: Toronto, Ontario, Canada
- Key people: Rahim Suleman (CEO)
- Products: Rare earth elements
- Website: neomaterials.com

Neo Performance Materials (formerly Molycorp Inc.) is a Canadian mining corporation headquartered in Toronto, Ontario. The corporation was formerly traded on the New York Stock Exchange, owned the Mountain Pass rare earth mine in California. Molycorp filed for bankruptcy in June 2015 amid changing competitive circumstances, declining prices and a 2014 restructuring. It was purchased by its largest creditor Oaktree Capital Management and was reorganized as Neo Performance Materials.

== History ==
=== Molycorp Inc. ===
Roots of the company dated back to 1919 when the Molybdenum Corporation of America, established as a subsidiary of the Electric Reduction Company, started molybdenum ore mining at Questa, New Mexico.

In 1950, the Molybdenum Corporation of America bought the Mountain Pass mining claims, and began production in 1952. It changed its name to Molycorp in 1974. The corporation was acquired by Union Oil in 1977, which in turn became part of Chevron Corporation in 2005. In 2007, Molycorp Inc. was merged with the Pittsburg & Midway Coal Company to form Chevron Mining Inc.

In 2008, Chevron Mining sold the Mountain Pass rare earth mine and the rights to the Molycorp name to Rare Earth Acquisitions LLC, a special purpose company which was renamed Molycorp Minerals LLC. The company was owned by Resource Capital Funds, Pegasus Partners IV, LP, The Goldman Sachs Group, Inc., Traxys North America LLC and Carint Group LLC. On July 29, 2010, Molycorp, Inc., a newly established parent company of Molycorp Minerals LLC, became a publicly traded firm by selling 28,125,000 shares at $14 in its IPO. The shares were traded under the ticker symbol MCP on the NYSE.

In April 2011, Molycorp bought 90% stake in a rare metals processing company Silmet in Estonia for US$89 million. Silmet was renamed Molycorp Silmet and remaining 10% was acquired by Molycorp in October 2011.

In June 2012, Molycorp acquired the Canadian-based company Neo Material Technologies Inc. Neo Material Technologies Inc. was incorporated in 2006 by merger of the Indianapolis-based company Magnequench and the Canadian rare elements company AMR Technologies, Inc. Magnequench, a manufacturer of neodymium-iron-boron magnets, was founded by General Motors in 1986.

In November 2012, the company announced that it was being investigated by the U.S. Securities and Exchange Commission in connection with the accuracy of the company's public disclosures. In June 2013, Molycorp Inc. said the SEC has completed the investigation and has not recommended any enforcement action.

In 2014, with the company facing heavy capital needs and lower prices in the China-dominated market, Oaktree Capital Group had won the bidding to provide up to $400 million of senior restructuring finance. Molycorp filed for bankruptcy protection in late June 2015, after changing competitive circumstances, declining prices on output and a 2014 restructuring. At the same time it announced an agreement "with major creditors to restructure its $1.70 billion debt load". It was purchased by its largest creditor Oaktree Capital Management and was reorganized as Neo Performance Materials.

=== Neo Performance Materials ===
Neo Performance Materials Inc. is a Canada-based company involved in the green energy transition. It manufactures essential components used in various technologies that promote environmental sustainability. The company operates globally, with facilities in North America, Europe, and Asia, including a rare earth separations plant in Jiangyin, China, and a processing facility in Sillamäe, Estonia.

In September 2024, the company announced the sale of its rare earth separations plant in Jiangyin, China.

== Operations ==
=== Mountain Pass mine ===
The company’s principal asset was the Mountain Pass rare earth mine, which once supplied the majority of the world's rare earth elements. The mine was previously owned by Unocal. The mine closed in 2002, but reopened in 2010. Because of the competition from China, the mine became unprofitable. In the reorganization process of Molycorp, the mine was separated from the company and scheduled to be sold in March 2017 at the auction in bankruptcy court, with a $40 million opening offer.

=== International business ===
In December 2010, Japanese firms Sumitomo and Mitsubishi signed agreements to be supplied with rare earths by Molycorp. US-based fluid catalytic cracking (FCC) catalyst manufacturer W.R. Grace & Co. similarly signed a supply agreement with Molycorp in November 2010. Molycorp was to supply W.R. Grace & Co. with an undisclosed amount of lanthanum and cerium, essential components for FCC catalyst manufacturing through 2015.

Molycorp additionally owns one of the few processing plants outside China—Molycorp Silmet—that it had purchased in Estonia in 2011.
