= Johnston County School District =

School district in North Carolina, United States

Johnston County Schools
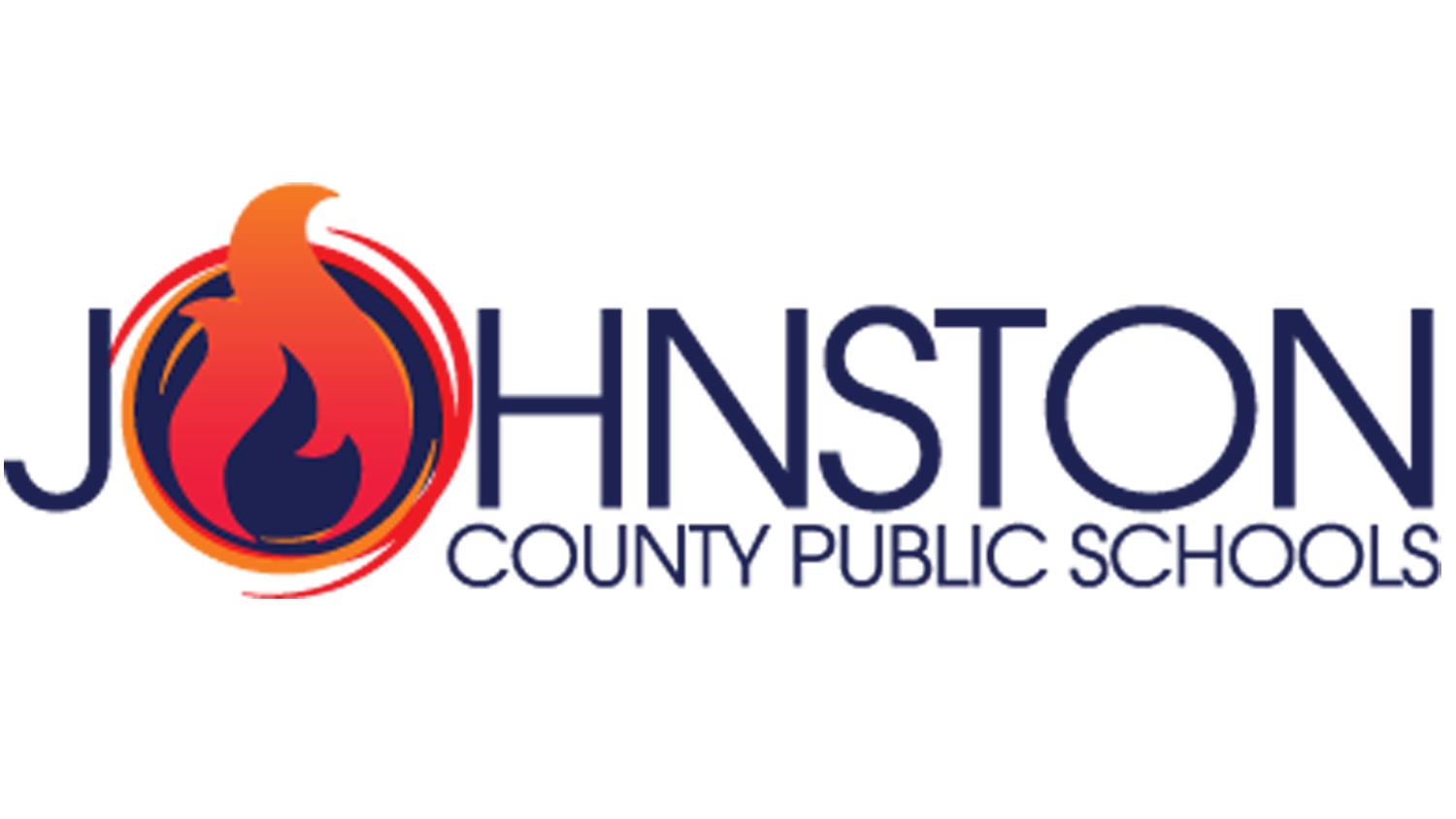

Location
- Johnston County, North Carolina United States

District information
- Type: Public
- Motto: Fostering a Flame for Learning
- Grades: Pre K-12
- Established: 1969
- Superintendent: Dr. Eric C. Bracy

Students and staff
- Students: 36,879
- Staff: 5,000+

Other information
- Website: johnston.k12.nc.us

The Johnston County School District serves Johnston County, North Carolina. Currently, Johnston County has 48 schools, which serve over 36,879 students, and experiences a 4% increase in enrollment yearly. The district is centered in the county seat, Smithfield. Dr. Eric C. Bracy was appointed as superintendent on July 1, 2020.

== History ==
In 2021, the county school board banned the teaching of critical race theory. In 2025 the school district prohibited instructors from displaying LGBT pride flags.

== Demographics ==
As of 2024, there are 36,879 students enrolled in Johnston County Schools. 47.07% of students are White, 29.92% are Hispanic, 18.33% are African American, 5.53% are Multiracial, 0.89% are Asian, 0.23% are Native American, and 0.03% are Pacific Islander.

== Elementary schools ==
- Benson Elementary School, Benson
- Cleveland Elementary School, Cleveland
- Cooper Academy, Clayton (Note: Name changed from Cooper Elementary in 2017)
- Corinth-Holders Elementary School, Archer Lodge
- Dixon Road Elementary School, Willow Spring
- East Clayton Elementary School, Clayton
- Four Oaks Elementary School, Four Oaks
- Glendale-Kenly Elementary School, Kenly
- McGee's Crossroads Elementary School, McGee's Crossroads
- Meadow School (K-8), Benson
- Micro Elementary School, Micro
- Pine Level Elementary School, Pine Level
- Polenta Elementary School, Cleveland
- Powhatan Elementary School, Clayton
- Princeton Elementary School, Princeton
- River Dell Elementary School, Archer Lodge
- Riverwood Elementary School, Clayton
- Selma Elementary School, Selma
- South Smithfield Elementary School, Smithfield
- Swift Creek Elementary, Smithfield
- Thanksgiving Elementary School, Selma
- West Clayton Elementary School, Clayton
- West Smithfield Elementary School, Smithfield
- West View Elementary School, Cleveland
- Wilson's Mills Elementary School, Wilson's Mills

== Middle schools ==
- Archer Lodge Middle School, Archer Lodge
- Benson Middle School, Benson
- Clayton Middle School, Clayton
- Cleveland Middle School, Cleveland
- Four Oaks Middle School, Four Oaks
- McGee's Crossroads Middle School, McGee's Crossroads
- Meadow School (K-8), Benson
- North Johnston Middle School, Micro
- Princeton Middle/High School (6-12), Princeton
- Riverwood Middle School, Clayton
- Selma Middle School, Selma
- Smithfield Middle School, Smithfield
- Swift Creek Middle School, Clayton

== High schools ==
- Clayton High School, Clayton
- Cleveland High School, Cleveland
- Corinth Holders High School, Wendell
- North Johnston High School, Kenly
- Princeton High School (6-12), Princeton
- Smithfield-Selma High School, Smithfield
- South Johnston High School, Four Oaks
- West Johnston High School, Benson
- Wilson's Mills High School, Wilson's Mills

== Speciality schools ==
Johnston County also has two special high schools on the campus of Johnston Community College and one on the campus of Clayton High School. There is also an alternative school, Choice Plus Academy, located in Smithfield. JCPS also offers a virtual program, JCPS Virtual Academy.

- Johnston County Career and Technical Leadership Academy
- Johnston County Early College Academy
- Innovation Academy at South Campus
- Choice Plus Academy
- JCPS Virtual Academy

== Future Schools ==
- Wilson's Mills High, Wilson's Mills, Opening Fall 2026

== Fine Arts ==
Johnston County has a number of successful fine arts programs, especially in the marching arts. The county boasts a total of 17 Winter Guard International medals, 7 of them gold.
