= Cleveland, Johnston County, North Carolina =

- Unincorporated community
- Location within North Carolina Location within the United States
- Coordinates: 35°32′43″N 78°29′52″W
- Country: United States
- State: North Carolina
- County: Johnston
- Elevation: 243 ft (74 m)
- Time zone: UTC-5 (Eastern (EST))
  - Summer (DST): UTC-4 (EDT)
- Area codes: 919, 984
- GNIS feature ID: 1026848

Cleveland is an unincorporated community in suburban northwestern Johnston County, North Carolina, United States. It lies at an elevation of 243 feet (74 m). The settlement is also known as Cleveland Crossings, Cleveland Community, Cleveland School or 40/42, so named for the intersection of I-40 and NC Hwy 42 at the northeastern edge of the community, which serves as the primary commercial hub of the area. NC Hwy 50 skirts the western edge of the community. The community's population is concentrated along Cleveland Road (also known as Cleveland School Road) in Johnston County. While officially unincorporated, postal addresses for the community generally lie in Garner (for the northern parts of the community), Clayton (in the eastern and central parts of the community) and Benson (for the southern part of the community). The community is named for the Cleveland School, a former K-12 school lying on Cleveland Road, the grounds of which currently house a community center, senior adult housing, a gymnasium and numerous athletic fields managed by the Greater Cleveland Athletic Association (GCAA), and a branch of the Johnston Community College. Nearby unincorporated communities include McGee's Crossroads to the south along NC 50 and Willow Spring to the west along NC 42.

There have been several efforts to incorporate the rapidly growing community, though the issue was tabled by the North Carolina General Assembly in 1999. Since there is already a town known as Cleveland elsewhere in the state, the name of the proposed incorporated town has been a minor point of contention. Thousands of new homes have been built in the community, making it one of the fastest-growing areas in Johnston County. Its location at a major interchange along Interstate 40 has made it a burgeoning business center.

== Education ==
Public education for the Cleveland community is provided by the Johnston County School District. The following schools serve residents of the Cleveland community:

=== Elementary ===
- Cleveland Elementary School
- Polenta Elementary School
- West View Elementary School

=== Middle ===
- Cleveland Middle School
- Swift Creek Middle School

=== High ===
- Cleveland High School
- West Johnston High School

=== Post-secondary ===
- Johnston Community College's Cleveland Center
