= Blackmans Crossroads, North Carolina =

Unincorporated community in North Carolina

Coordinates: 35°40′09″N 78°18′25″W

Blackmans Crossroads is an unincorporated community in Johnston County, North Carolina, At the intersection of North Carolina Highway 96, and Stricklands Crossroads Rd, east of Benson and south of Four Oaks.

The crossroads is home to a local fire department of the same name. As well as being the name of the local fire district

There’s also a church, restaurant, country store, and community pool by the same name.

The local fire department was a subject of impropriety several years ago, with embezzlement by the fire chief, who has since been replaced.

A topic of local debate is the proper spelling and use of an apostrophe of the area's name. 3 common variations are Blackmans, Blackman's and Blackmons.
