= Johnston County Early College Academy =

Location
- 245 College Road; Smithfield, North Carolina 27521; United States
- Coordinates: 35°30′02″N 78°20′02″W

Information
- Other names: JCECA; ECA
- Type: Public vocational school
- Established: 2008
- School district: Johnston County School District
- NCES School ID: 370237003116
- Principal: Robert Daniels
- Teaching staff: 10.50 (on an FTE basis)
- Grades: 9–13
- Enrollment: 282 (2023-2024)
- Student to teacher ratio: 26.86
- Mascot: Lions
- Website: www.johnston.k12.nc.us/jceca

Johnston County Early College Academy (JCECA or ECA) is a public vocational, early college high school in Smithfield, North Carolina, United States. It was established in 2008 and is part of the Johnston County School District. It operates at the Johnston Community College campus at the Smith Building.

== Curriculum ==
After applying and getting accepted, students at the school are dual enrolled in JCC and JCCTLA. The primary mission is to prepare students with the general qualifications to transfer to a 4-year college. A diploma and an associate degree are both awarded upon graduation. The program is five years long to accommodate the extra classes needed for graduation. The schedule does not follow the traditional Johnston County School schedule and instead follows the Johnston Community College calendar.

== Achievement ==
According to The News & Observer, "Middle College and its 5-year-old sibling, Early College, have consistently outperformed other high schools in Johnston, posting high test scores and earning the county’s only A’s from the state."
