= Cleveland High School (North Carolina) =

American public school in North Carolina

Location
- 1892 Polenta Road; Clayton, North Carolina 27520; United States; 35°33′13″N 78°29′58″W

Information
- Other name: CvHS
- School type: Public
- Established: 2010 (16 years ago)
- School district: Johnston County School District
- CEEB code: 340751
- Principal: Jenna Sauls Hairr
- Teaching staff: 97.75 (FTE)
- Grades: 9–12
- Enrollment: 1,896 (2023-2024)
- Student to teacher ratio: 19.40
- Colors: White, light blue, and dark blue
- Mascot: Ram
- Nickname: Rams
- Feeder schools: Clayton Middle, Cleveland Middle, Swift Creek Middle
- Website: cvhs.johnston.k12.nc.us

Cleveland High School or CvHS is located in unincorporated Johnston County, North Carolina. The school lies within the Cleveland community, with a postal address of Clayton. It is a public school and is a part of Johnston County Schools.

== History ==
The school was established during the 2010–2011 school year. Cleveland High School was originally part of Cleveland School, which was founded in 1925 as an all-grade school. However, in 1969, due to the growth of student population in Johnston County, the high school grade students were moved to high schools throughout the county, including South Johnston High School.

To account for the continued growth in Johnston County, two new schools, Cleveland High School and Corinth Holders High School opened in 2010.

== Notable alumni ==
- Omarion Hampton, NFL running back for Los Angeles Chargers
- Kodi Whitley, MLB pitcher
