= John William Wood =

American politician (1855–1928)

John William Wood Sr. (December 28, 1855 – October 31, 1928) was a member of the North Carolina House of Representatives in 1927, representing Johnston County.

He is also known one of the founders of Benson, North Carolina. After having served on the Board of Education and for years as a County Commissioner, he was known to be a "watchdog" of the treasury.

Meadow School, in Peacocks Crossroads was built on land donated by Wood.
