= Four Oaks =

Four Oaks may refer to the following places:

- Four Oaks, East Sussex, an area in England
- Four Oaks, Gloucestershire, an area in England
- Four Oaks, Kent, an area in England
- Four Oaks, Solihull, West Midlands, England, a settlement in Berkswell parish
- Four Oaks, Sutton Coldfield, West Midlands, an area in England
- Four Oaks, Kentucky, United States
- Four Oaks, North Carolina, a town in North Carolina, United States
