= Hannah's Creek Primitive Baptist Church =

Historic church in North Carolina, United States

- U.S. National Register of Historic Places
- Location within North Carolina Location within the United States
- Location: NC 301 southwest of junction with NC 1171, Benson, North Carolina
- Coordinates: 35°24′36″N 78°30′20″W
- Area: 1 acre (0.40 ha)
- Built: c. 1834
- NRHP reference No.: 90002181
- Added to NRHP: January 25, 1991

Hannah's Creek Primitive Baptist Church is a historic Primitive Baptist church located at Benson, Johnston County, North Carolina. It was built about 1834 or about 1866, and is a vernacular one-story rectangular, timber-frame building, five bays wide and three bays deep. It rests on a brick pier foundation and has a gable roof. The building measures 36 feet wide and 48 feet long. The church was moved to its present location in the 1930s. Also on the property is a contributing church cemetery with burials dating from the late-19th century to 1940.

It was listed on the National Register of Historic Places in 1991.
