= Mike Wooten =

Mike Wooten may refer to:

- Mike Wooten (trooper), Alaska State trooper tied to the Sarah Palin Public Safety Commissioner dismissal
- Mike Wooten (American football) (born 1962), American football player
