= Benson Historic District (Benson, North Carolina) =

Historic district in North Carolina, United States

- U.S. National Register of Historic Places
- U.S. Historic district
- Location within North Carolina Location within the United States
- Location: Roughly bounded by E. Hill, N. Lee, E. Parish and Farmers Dr. on Main and Church Sts., Benson, North Carolina
- Coordinates: 35°22′54″N 78°32′51″W
- Area: 53 acres (21 ha)
- Architect: Multiple
- Architectural style: Late 19th And 20th Century Revivals, Bungalow/craftsman, Late Victorian
- NRHP reference No.: 85001053
- Added to NRHP: May 9, 1985

Benson Historic District is a national historic district located at Benson, Johnston County, North Carolina. It encompasses 104 contributing buildings in the town of Benson. It includes notable examples of Late Victorian and Bungalow / American Craftsman style architecture and buildings dating from about 1900 to 1930. It includes commercial, residential, ecclesiastical, and educational structures. Notable buildings include the Farmers Commercial Bank (1921), C. T. Johnson Building (1910), James E. Wilson Livery Stable· and Store (c. 1925), Carolina-Parrish Hotel (c. 1918), Boon-Lawhorn House, Lonnie Stevens House (c. 1916), Dr. Parker-Allen House (c. 1910), Baptist Church (1914-1915), United Methodist Church (1917), and Benson Elementary School (c. 1915).

It was listed on the National Register of Historic Places in 1985.
