= Boyette Slave House =

Historic house in North Carolina, United States

- U.S. National Register of Historic Places
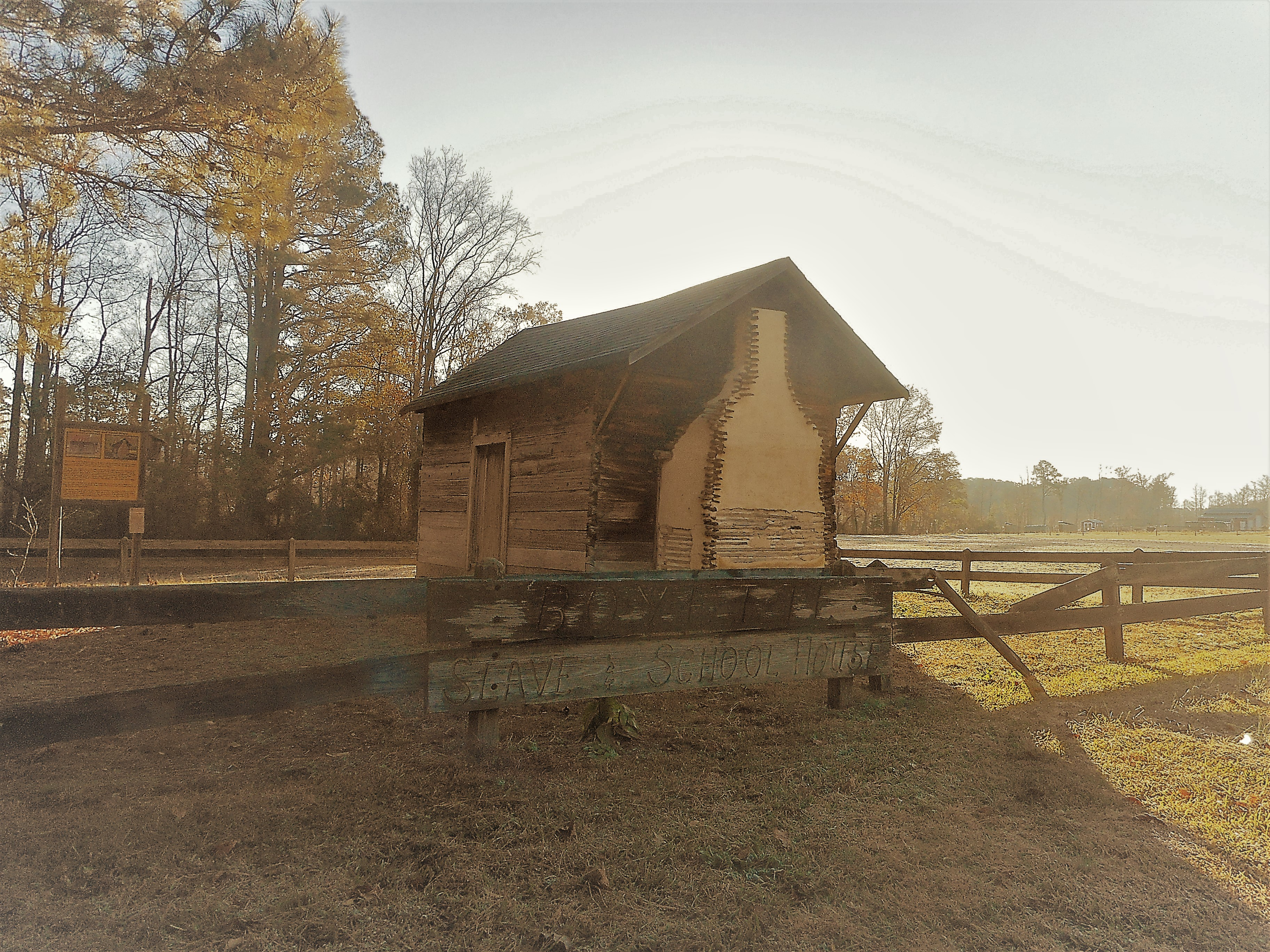
- The Boyette Slave House and surrounding properties in December 2021.

- Location within North Carolina Location within the United States
- Location: Northwest of Kenly on SR 2110, near Kenly, North Carolina
- Coordinates: 35°39′9″N 78°10′52″W
- Area: less than one acre
- NRHP reference No.: 79003329
- Added to NRHP: September 20, 1979

Boyette Slave House is a historic home located near Kenly, Johnston County, North Carolina. It is a small one-room log dwelling. It is built of hewn and pit-sawn plans and features a gable end stick and mud chimney. The building measures 16 feet by 12 feet and 8 feet tall. Between 1890 and 1910 it was reused as a schoolhouse.

It was listed on the National Register of Historic Places in 1979. The site of the Boyette Plantation House across the street is not listed.
