= Johnston County Career and Technical Leadership Academy =

American public vocational school in North Carolina

Location
- 245 College Road; Smithfield, North Carolina 27577; United States
- 35°30′16″N 78°19′47″W

Information
- Other names: JCCTLA; CTLA
- Type: Public vocational school
- Established: 2016
- School district: Johnston County School District
- NCES School ID: 370237003408
- Principal: Sheila Singleton
- Teaching staff: 11.26 (on an FTE basis)
- Grades: 9–13
- Enrollment: 200 (2019-20)
- Student to teacher ratio: 17.76
- Mascot: Wolves
- Website: www.johnston.k12.nc.us/jcctla

Johnston County Career and Technical Leadership Academy (JCCTLA or CTLA) is a public vocational, early college high school in Smithfield, North Carolina, United States. It was established in 2016 and is part of the Johnston County School District. It operates at the Johnston Community College campus.

== History ==
Johnston County Career and Technical Leadership Academy was established in 2016 and was originally located at Clayton High School. Started by Ed Croom, former superintendent of Johnston County School District, it is a high school "to raise academic achievement while focusing on career and technical education such as health care and computer engineering".

By 2017, space limitations and schedule conflicts at Clayton led to a move to Johnston Community College, where the school replaced the county's successful two year Middle College program. According to The News & Observer, "Middle College and its 5-year-old sibling, Early College, have consistently outperformed other high schools in Johnston, posting high test scores and earning the county’s only A’s from the state."

== Curriculum ==
The school has six career pathway options which are Medical Assisting, Nurse Aide, Information Technology, Applied Engineering,and Mechanical Engineering.

Students at the school are dual enrolled and take classes from both JCC and JCCTLA. The program is five years long, rather than the traditional four that high schools normally have. A high school diploma and an associate degree are both awarded upon graduation.
