= Four Oaks Commercial Historic District =

Historic district in North Carolina, United States

- U.S. National Register of Historic Places
- U.S. Historic district
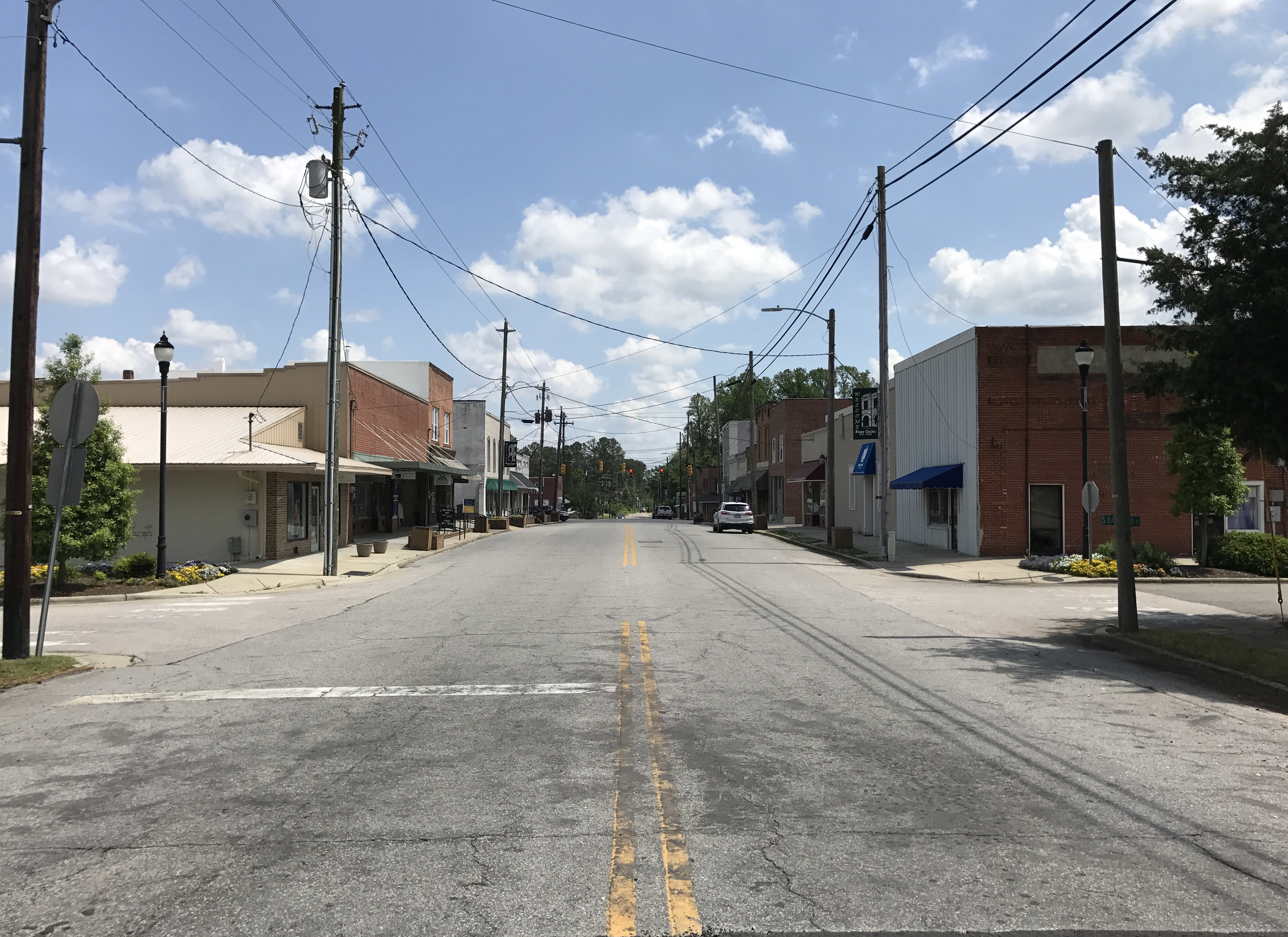
- The district at Main Street and Wellons Street

- Location within North Carolina Location within the United States
- Location: 100-300 blocks N. Main, 100-200 blocks S. Main, 100 blk S.W. Railroad, 100 blk W. Wellons St. & 100 blk W. Woodall St., Four Oaks, North Carolina
- Coordinates: 35°26′46″N 78°25′46″W
- Area: 10 acres (4.0 ha)
- Architectural style: Early Commercial, Mission/spanish Revival
- NRHP reference No.: 06000692
- Added to NRHP: August 9, 2006

Four Oaks Commercial Historic District is a national historic district located at Four Oaks, Johnston County, North Carolina. It encompasses 29 contributing buildings and 1 contributing structure in the town of Four Oaks. It includes notable examples of Mission Revival style architecture and buildings dating from about 1890 to 1957. It includes commercial, residential, ecclesiastical, and educational structures. Notable buildings include the W.E. Stanley Store (c. 1890, 1947), Blake Adams Store (1904), Four Oaks Bank Building, Lassiter Building (c. 1925), W. D. Allen Building (1926), Four Oaks Drugstore (1937), Sinclair Gas Station (c. 1930s).

It was listed on the National Register of Historic Places in 2006.
