= Mike Wooten (American football) =

American football player (born 1962)

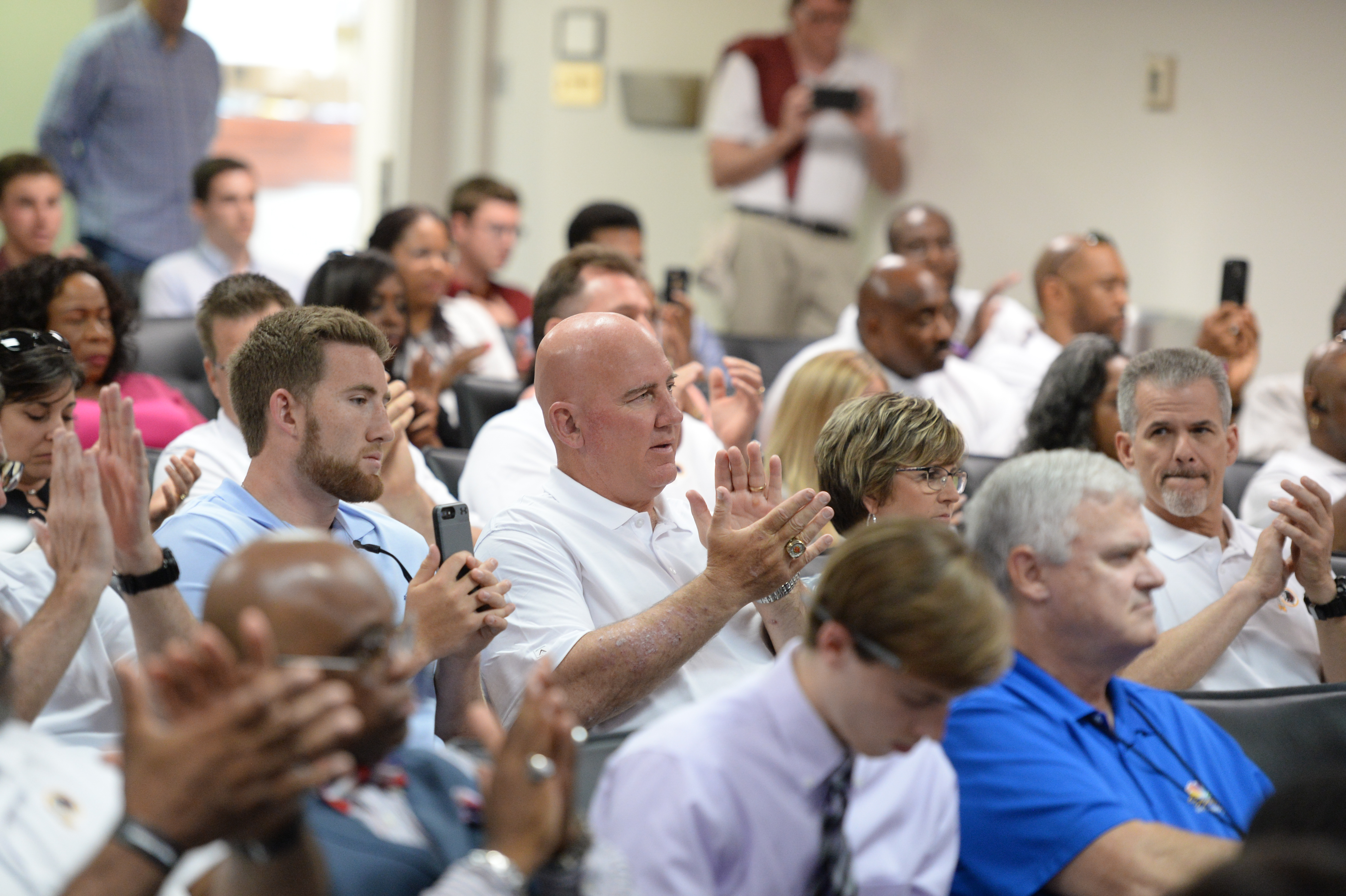
- Wooten (center) at a Super Bowl ring ceremony held in 2018

No. 60
- Position: Center

Personal information
- Born: October 23, 1962 (age 64); Roanoke, Virginia, U.S.
- Listed height: 6 ft 3 in (1.91 m)
- Listed weight: 260 lb (118 kg)

Career information
- High school: Smithfield-Selma (Smithfield, North Carolina)
- College: VMI
- NFL draft: 1985: undrafted

Career history
- Washington Redskins (1987)

Career NFL statistics
- Games played: 3
- Games started: 0
- Stats at Pro Football Reference

Michael Carroll Wooten (born October 23, 1962) is an American former professional football player who was a center in the National Football League (NFL) for the Washington Redskins during the 1987 NFL season. He played college football for the VMI Keydets.

== Early life ==
Wooten was born in Roanoke, Virginia. His family moved to Smithfield, North Carolina in 1969 when his father, Carroll Wooten, was hired as an assistant principal and assistant football coach at Smithfield-Selma High School. While attending Smithfield-Selma, Wooten participated in football, wrestling and track. In football, he was an all-state and all-conference selection at tight end and defensive end, playing in the North-South All-Star Game after his senior season. He graduated in 1981.

== College career ==
Wooten attended and played college football at the Virginia Military Institute. His senior year, he was selected as co-captain and received pre-season all-American honors. He graduated with a degree in economics before being commissioned as a Second lieutenant in the United States Army.

== Professional career ==
Wooten played for the Washington Redskins in the 1987 season. The 1987 season began with a 24-day players' strike, reducing the 16-game season to 15. The games for weeks 4–6 were won with all replacement players, including Wooten. The Redskins have the distinction of being the only team with no players crossing the picket line. Those three victories are often credited with getting the team into the playoffs and the basis for the 2000 film The Replacements.

In 2018, Wooten was awarded a Super Bowl ring for playing for the Redskins in 1987, the year they won Super Bowl XXII.

== Officiating career ==
Wooten is now a football referee in the Atlantic Coast Conference at the position of umpire and he was selected to officiate the 2008 ACC Championship Game in Tampa, Florida.

== Personal life ==
Wooten was named to the Johnston County Sports Hall of Fame in 2008. He is married and has two children, Michael and Meredith. His son played as a tight end for the Campbell football team.
