= North Johnston High School =

American public school in North Carolina

Location
- 5915 US Hwy 301 N Kenly, North Carolina 27542; United States; 35°34′15″N 78°11′02″W

Information
- Type: Public
- Founded: 1965 (61 years ago)
- School district: Johnston County School District
- CEEB code: 342010
- Principal: David K. Allen
- Teaching staff: 53.18 (FTE)
- Grades: 9–12
- Enrollment: 798 (2023-2024)
- Student to teacher ratio: 15.01
- Colors: Red and grey
- Sports: Yes
- Mascot: Panther
- Website: https://www.johnston.k12.nc.us/o/njhs

North Johnston High School (NJHS) is a public high school in Kenly, North Carolina.

== Community ==
North Johnston High School serves an area composed of several small communities and towns: Glendale-Chapel, Kenly, Micro, and Pine Level. These communities had their own local schools until the consolidated NJHS opened in 1965.

== Sports ==
=== Men's ===
- Baseball (has junior varsity team)
- Basketball (has junior varsity team)
- Cross country
- Football (has junior varsity team)
- Golf
- Soccer (has junior varsity team)
- Swimming
- Tennis
- Track and field
- Wrestling

=== Women's ===
- Basketball (has varsity team)
- Cross country
- Golf
- Soccer (has varsity team)
- Softball (has varsity team)
- Swimming
- Tennis
- Track and field
- Volleyball (has junior varsity and varsity team)
