= John Medlin =

- Born: November 23, 1933; Elevation, North Carolina, U.S.
- Died: June 7, 2012 (aged 78)
- Education: University of North Carolina at Chapel Hill
- Occupation: Business executive

John Grimes Medlin Jr. (November 23, 1933 – June 7, 2012) was the chief executive officer of Wachovia from 1977 to 1993. He also served as chairman of the bank from 1988 to 1998.

== Personal life ==
Medlin was born in Elevation, North Carolina to John G. Medlin Sr. and Mabel Stephenson. He grew up on the family farm, moving to Benson, NC, during high school. The first member of his family to attend college, he studied at the University of North Carolina on a Navy scholarship. He obtained a Bachelor of Science in business administration from the University of North Carolina at Chapel Hill in 1956.

== Career ==
After graduating from college, Medlin served in the U.S. Navy as a paymaster aboard a submarine support ship from 1956 to 1959. After leaving the Navy, Medlin joined Winston-Salem-based Wachovia the same year. He was named president in 1974 and CEO in 1977. During his time as CEO, Wachovia's assets grew from $3.6 billion to $35.3 billion, making it the 20th largest bank in the country.

== Honors ==
In 1995, Medlin was inducted into the North Carolina Business Hall of Fame. He was honored in 1998 as the recipient of the Distinguished Citizens Award from the N.C. Citizens for Business & Industry. The North Carolina Bar Association honored Medlin "for outstanding contributions to the administration of justice in North Carolina” in 2008. In the 1990s, Medlin was appointed by Chief Justice James G. Exum to serve on the North Carolina State Judicial Council and as chairman of the commission on the Future of Justice and the Courts in North Carolina.

== Death ==
Medlin died on June 7, 2012, from a heart attack while playing tennis.
