= Corey Lee (baseball) =

American baseball player (born 1974)

- Pitcher
- Born: December 26, 1974 (age 51); Raleigh, North Carolina, U.S.
- Batted: Left Threw: Left

Professional debut
- MLB: August 24, 1999, for the Texas Rangers
- NPB: August 1, 2005, for the Hokkaido Nippon Ham Fighters

Last appearance
- MLB: August 24, 1999, for the Texas Rangers
- NPB: June 7, 2006, for the Hokkaido Nippon Ham Fighters

MLB statistics
- Win–loss record: 0–1
- Earned run average: 27.00
- Strikeouts: 0

NPB statistics
- Win–loss record: 8–7
- Earned run average: 3.42
- Strikeouts: 70
- Stats at Baseball Reference

Teams
- Texas Rangers (1999); Hokkaido Nippon Ham Fighters (2005–2006)

Corey Wayne Lee (born December 26, 1974) is an American former Major League Baseball pitcher who played in one game for the Texas Rangers in 1999.

== Amateur career ==
Lee attended Clayton High School in North Carolina and played college baseball for North Carolina State University. In 1995 and 1996, he played collegiate summer baseball with the Falmouth Commodores of the Cape Cod Baseball League. He was selected by Texas in the first round of the 1996 MLB draft.

== Professional career ==
In his lone appearance in a major league uniform, Lee pitched one inning, allowing an eleventh-inning, three-run home run to Tino Martinez of the New York Yankees.
