= West Johnston High School =

American school in North Carolina

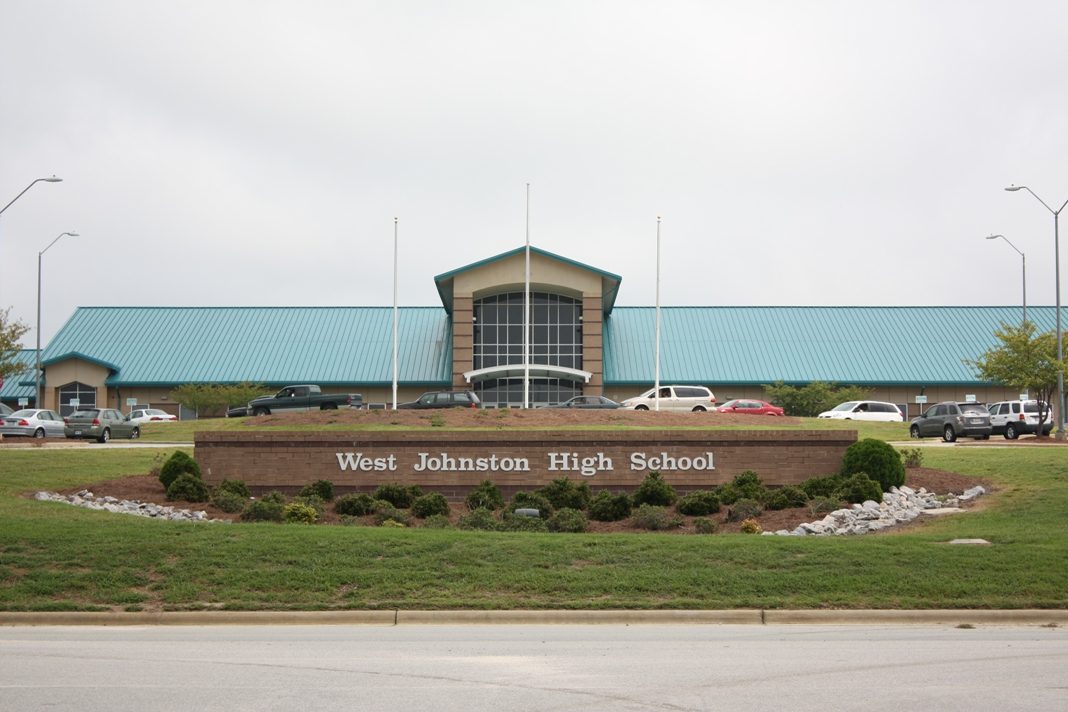

Location
- 5935 Raleigh Road; Benson, North Carolina 27504; United States; 35°31′22″N 78°32′15″W

Information
- Other names: WJHS, West
- Motto: "On the Prowl with Excellence!"
- Established: 2002 (24 years ago)
- Founder: Patricia Harris
- CEEB code: 340298
- Principal: Larkeysha Sheppard
- Faculty: 79.47 (FTE)
- Grades: 9–12
- Enrollment: 1,338 (2019-20)
- Student to teacher ratio: 16.84
- Colors: Teal and white
- Fight song: Go Northwestern! Go!
- Mascot: Wildcat
- Website: www.johnston.k12.nc.us/o/wjhs

West Johnston High School or WJHS is located in Benson, North Carolina. It is part of Johnston County School district, and was established in the 2002-2003 school year to address crowding problems in other local high schools.

== History ==
The first graduating class of West Johnston was in 2004, and the first class to graduate after full-four year completion was in 2006. Patricia Harris led the school for its first 4 years and worked to build the school's reputation as one of the top high schools in the state. In 2006–2007, Brookie Honeycutt took over as principal. In 2011, Paula Coates worked as principal until 2017.

== Marching band ==
The band has performed in many local, regional and national events including the Bands of America Grand Nationals many times. The band was chosen to represent the state by marching in the 2005 Inaugural Parade honoring President George W. Bush. In November 2008, the band participated in the Macy's Thanksgiving Day parade where they were the first to use props. In the 2012–2013 school year, the band was invited by the Lord Mayer to perform in London's New Years Day parade.

On March 23, 2010, police arrested Mitchell Lance Britt, former band director at West Johnston High School, for 3 counts of felony sexual offense involving a student and one count sexually exploiting a minor. The Federal Bureau of Investigation has been asked to assist because he has been accused on several incidents of happenings on band trips in other states. Britt was suspected of having sexual relations with multiple students in his home. Federal agents have said they found videos of Britt and another student that are sexual in nature involving nudity. Britt resigned in November 2009, and was living in Pennsylvania looking for other school jobs at the time of his arrest.

Britt pleaded guilty to sex crimes charges involving 2 students in April 2012. He pleaded guilty under an Alford plea. He received 45 days in jail.

=== Music from the New World for a New Era (2002) ===
The first marching band group was established in the fall of 2002 when the high school opened. The majority of members at this time came from other schools, such as South Johnston High School. The marching band competed in its first Bands of America Regional Competition in New York.

=== Following years (2003–2007) ===
- Competed at Bands of America (BOA) Grand National Championship in Indianapolis, and placed 21st in semi-finals (2004)
- 21st at BOA Grand Nationals (2005)
- 17th at BOA Grand Nationals (2006)
- 15th at BOA Grand Nationals (2007)

=== The Inner Compass (2008) ===
The Inner Compass was a show based on an individual's decisions made based on their inner compass. The drill depicted many images of compasses pointing west (a play on the high school's name). All the music for this show was composed from the Broadway Musical/movie West Side Story. During this season, West traveled to Maryland to compete in the Towson Regional, where they were awarded Grand Champion. Rather than traveling to Grand Nationals after an undefeated season, the band traveled to NYC in November to perform in the Macy's Thanksgiving Day Parade, where they performed their show Boogie Wonderland to the music of Earth, Wind & Fire.

== Winter Guard ==
The winter guard at WJHS is another extracurricular activity. They have performed in many local, regional, and national competitions, with both WGI and AIA. The winter guard is split into varsity and junior varsity. The varsity guard has been in the Scholastic World Class division of Winter guard since 2010, and therefore is commonly known within the school as the "World Guard". For a similar reason, the junior varsity group is commonly known as the "A Guard".

Both of these groups have performed excellent shows. In 2008, the Open guard placed 2nd and the A guard placed 7th at the Atlantic Power Regional. The Open guard went on to compete in the WGI World Championships, placing 6th in finals.

In 2009, Wind was formed. Wind (a shortening of "west independent") is composed of West Johnston alumni and friends. At the 2009 WGI World Championships in Dayton, Ohio, they placed 9th in finals with a score of 87.4.

On April 10, 2010, the Open Guard was named 2010 WGI World Championships Scholastic Open Class Champions with a score of 97.05 and was awarded the Gold Medal. This is West Johnston's second WGI medal—in 2004, the Guard (then in A Class) scored 95.6 in the Scholastic A Class Finals and was awarded the Silver medal.

== Fine Arts department ==
West Johnston High School offers fine arts courses in the following areas: art design, modern dance, band (marching and ensemble performance), choral groups, and theatre classes.

The choral ensembles present many concerts throughout the year, including out-of-state performances, such as Walt Disney World in Orlando, Florida for several years, as well as being selected to represent North Carolina in the Festival of the States 2008 in Washington D.C.
