= Mark Thomas (tight end) =

American football player (born 1976)

No. 89
- Position: Tight end

Personal information
- Born: April 26, 1976 (age 50); Kinston, North Carolina, U.S.
- Listed height: 6 ft 4 in (1.93 m)
- Listed weight: 252 lb (114 kg)

Career information
- High school: Smithfield-Selma
- College: North Carolina State
- NFL draft: 1998: undrafted

Career history
- Jacksonville Jaguars (1998–1999)*; New York Giants (1999); Memphis Maniax (2001); Kansas City Chiefs (2001)*; Pittsburgh Steelers (2001)*; Denver Broncos (2001)*; Rhein Fire (2002); Tennessee Titans (2002)*
- * Offseason or practice squad member only
- Stats at Pro Football Reference

Mark D. Thomas (born April 26, 1976) is an American former professional football player who was a tight end for the New York Giants of the National Football League (NFL). He played college football for the NC State Wolfpack.

Thomas cohosted a morning sports talk show, Mark and Mike, (with Mike Maniscalco) on a radio station based in Raleigh, North Carolina.
