= Meadow Lights =

Christmas light display in North Carolina, United States

Coordinates: 35°18′9.4″N 78°28′13.4″W

Meadow Lights is a 30-acre (12 ha) display of Christmas lights near Meadow, North Carolina owned and operated by Roy Johnson and his family on land adjoining their home. It is the oldest and largest display of christmas lights in eastern North Carolina. The display features light displays, some several stories tall, alongside displays of mannequins depicting the life of Jesus. There is no admission fee, but visitors may purchase tickets for a train ride through the light display.

Johnson is a retired tobacco farmer who began the display as a hobby to entertain neighbors and his children. In 1994, the Johnsons built "The Old Country Store" in the parking lot to sell drinks and candy. In 2007, a carousel was added.
