= Cleveland Post =

Former newspaper in North Carolina, US

- Type: weekly newspaper
- Owner: Civitas Media
- Ceased publication: August 1, 2013
- Language: English
- Headquarters: 209 E. Vance St., Fuquay-Varina, North Carolina United States
- OCLC number: 27945778
- Website: www.clevelandpost.com

Cleveland Post was a weekly newspaper based in Fuquay-Varina, North Carolina, covering northwestern Johnston County, North Carolina, and the Cleveland community. It closed in 2013.
