= South Johnston High School =

American school in North Carolina

Location
- 10381 U.S. 301; Four Oaks, North Carolina 27524; United States; 35°24′34″N 78°30′04″W

Information
- Other name: "South"
- Established: 1969 (57 years ago)
- CEEB code: 340320
- Principal: Brody Massengil (Effective Jan 1 2026)
- Faculty: 75.72 (FTE)
- Grades: 9–12
- Enrollment: 1,332 (2024-25)
- Student to teacher ratio: 17.10
- Colors: Green and Vegas gold
- Mascot: Trojan
- Feeder schools: Benson Middle, Four Oaks Middle, Meadow School
- Website: johnston.k12.nc.us/sjhs

South Johnston High School (also referred to as "South") is a high school for grades 9–12 located in Four Oaks, North Carolina, near Benson. The school was built in 1969 in order to integrate the area's "all-white" and "all-black" schools. The principal is William Weaver, one of the former assistant principals at the school.

The school is located in the Southern portion of Johnston County. Middle schools that feed into South Johnston include Benson Middle School, Four Oaks Middle School, and Meadow School (K–8).

== Sports ==
The school mascot of South Johnston is the Trojan, and the school colors are green and Vegas gold.

SJHS offers a variety of sports which includes: volleyball, American football, cross country, wrestling, boys' and girls' tennis, boys' and girls' swimming, softball, baseball, boys' and girls' soccer, golf, boys' and girls' indoor & outdoor track, cheerleading, and boys' and girls' basketball.

== Notable alumni ==
- Ray Tanner – former college baseball head coach, helped lead South Carolina to two College World Series national championships in 2010 and 2011
