= Smithfield-Selma High School =

American public school in North Carolina

Location
- 700 M. Durwood Stephenson Parkway; Smithfield, North Carolina 27577; United States; 35°31′47″N 78°19′26″W

Information
- Type: Public
- Established: 1969 (57 years ago)
- CEEB code: 343642
- Principal: Dr. Ryan Ewell
- Faculty: 105.09 (FTE)
- Grades: 9–12
- Enrollment: 1,551 (2024-2025)
- Student to teacher ratio: 14.76
- Colors: Navy blue and Vegas gold
- Nickname: Spartans
- Website: www.johnston.k12.nc.us/o/sss

Smithfield-Selma High School is a public high school located in Smithfield, North Carolina. It is locally referred to as simply "SSS" (pronounced 'Triple S'). The school is part of Johnston County Schools.

== History ==
Smithfield-Selma High School opened its doors in September 1969 and graduated its first class in June 1970. The school opened with about 1400 students in grades 10 through 12. There were 34% black and 66% white. There were 75 faculty members and support staff, two assistant principals, two secretaries, and a bookkeeper.

The creation of the school proved to be particularly challenging due to the merging of six high schools. Two of the high schools had been only for black students, while four of the high schools had been predominantly white. The schools were: the Bulldogs of Richard B. Harrison, the Red Devils of Smithfield, the Hawks of Johnston Central, the Yellow Jackets of Selma, the Green Waves of Wilson's Mills, and the Pirates of Corinth Holder.

The school's first principal was Charles T. Tucker who brought order out of the chaos. He had new ideas, determination, a belief in people, confidence in the abilities of the youth, and a willingness to listen and understand even when he disagreed. The SSS Football Stadium is in his honor, named the Charles T. Tucker Stadium.

The school had a sound vocational program. It also had a first-class academic program. It has a rich tradition of athletics, with many conference and district championships. The AP program came into existence around 1975. In 1975 freshmen came to Smithfield-Selma and it was no longer a senior school. There were over 113 students enrolled in NJROTC and the Drill Team competed and won many championships.

== Notable alumni ==
- Barry Foote – Major League Baseball catcher for the Montreal Expos, Chicago Cubs, Philadelphia Phillies and New York Yankees
- Mark Thomas – American football tight end who played in the National Football League
