= Micro, North Carolina =

- Town
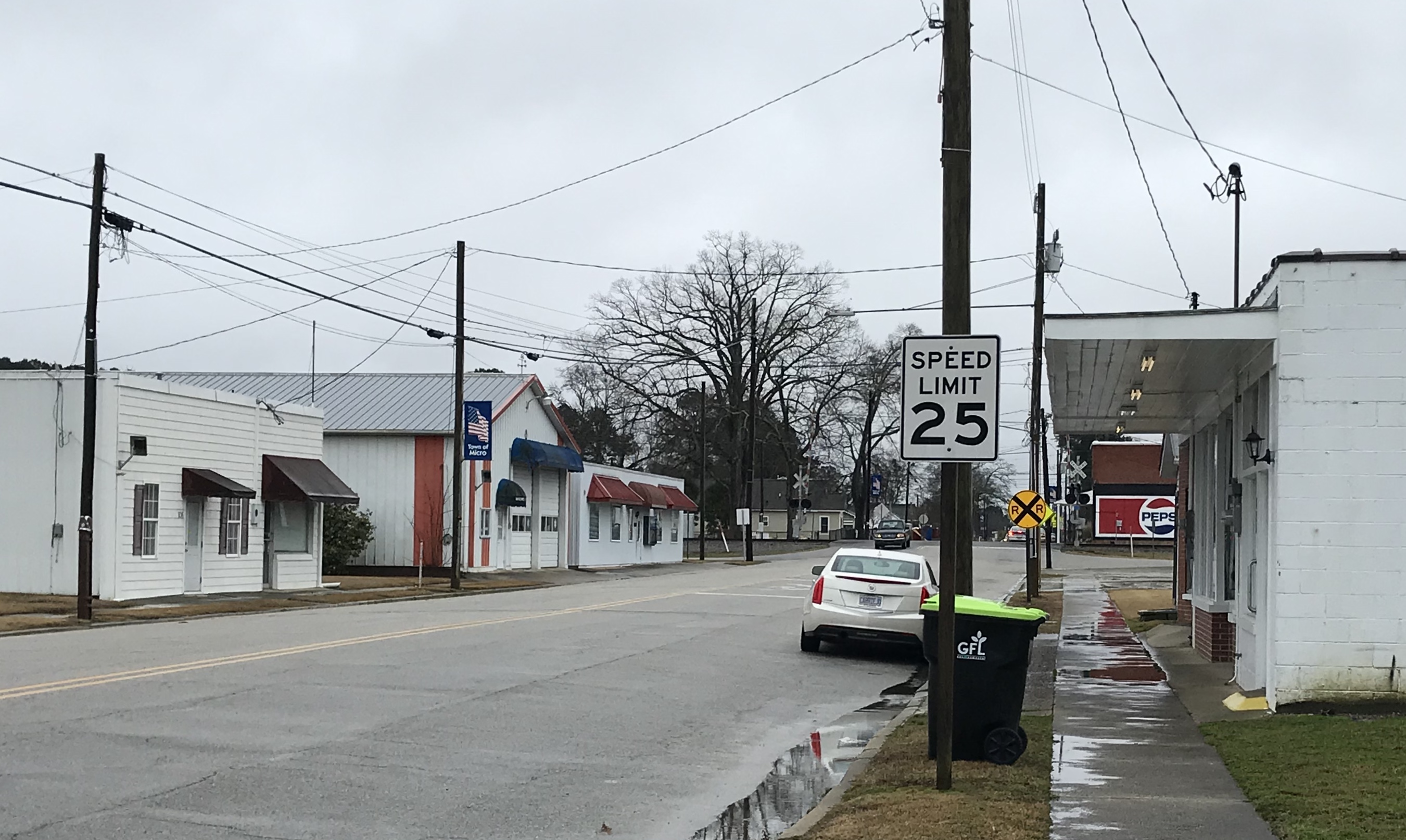
- Main Street

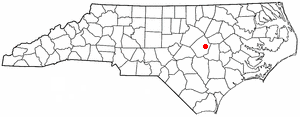
- Location of Micro, North Carolina
- Coordinates: 35°33′45″N 78°12′13″W
- Country: United States
- State: North Carolina
- County: Johnston

Area
  - Total: 0.42 sq mi (1.09 km^{2})
  - Land: 0.42 sq mi (1.09 km^{2})
  - Water: 0 sq mi (0.00 km^{2})
- Elevation: 194 ft (59 m)

Population (2020)
  - Total: 458
  - Density: 1,092.3/sq mi (421.75/km^{2})
- Time zone: UTC-5 (Eastern (EST))
  - Summer (DST): UTC-4 (EDT)
- ZIP code: 27555
- Area code: 919/984
- FIPS code: 37-42620
- GNIS feature ID: 2406155
- Website: https://www.townofmicro.net/

Micro is a town in Johnston County, North Carolina, United States. The population was 458 as of the 2020 census, up from 441 in the 2010 census.

== History ==
The community was settled in about 1890, developing along the "Short-Cut" rail line of the Wilmington and Weldon Railroad. It was incorporated nine years later as Jerome, being named for local landowner Jerome Creech. The name was changed to Micro in 1905 to avoid confusion with the Jerome community in Bladen County. A wooden school for white children was built that year. It was replaced by a brick building in 1924, which operated until 1987.

== Geography ==
According to the United States Census Bureau, the town has a total area of 0.4 square miles (1.0 km^{2}), all land.

== Demographics ==
Historical population
Census	Pop.	Note	%±
1900	61		—
1910	74		21.3%
1920	183		147.3%
1930	222		21.3%
1940	289		30.2%
1950	310		7.3%
1960	350		12.9%
1970	300		−14.3%
1980	438		46.0%
1990	417		−4.8%
2000	454		8.9%
2010	441		−2.9%
2020	458		3.9%
2023 (est.)	508	▲	10.9%
U.S. Decennial Census

Micro is the least-populated incorporated community in Johnston County. As of the census of 2000, there were 454 people, 211 households, and 124 families residing in the town. The population density was 1,114.9 inhabitants per square mile (430.5/km^{2}). There were 225 housing units at an average density of 552.5 per square mile (213.3/km^{2}). The racial makeup of the town was 90.97% White, 7.71% African American, 1.10% from other races, and 0.22% from two or more races. Hispanic or Latino of any race were 3.96% of the population.

There were 211 households, out of which 25.1% had children under the age of 18 living with them, 43.6% were married couples living together, 12.3% had a female householder with no husband present, and 41.2% were non-families. 39.8% of all households were made up of individuals, and 24.2% had someone living alone who was 65 years of age or older. The average household size was 2.15 and the average family size was 2.88.

In the town, the population was spread out, with 22.7% under the age of 18, 7.3% from 18 to 24, 26.0% from 25 to 44, 22.2% from 45 to 64, and 21.8% who were 65 years of age or older. The median age was 40 years. For every 100 females, there were 85.3 males. For every 100 females age 18 and over, there were 75.5 males.

The median income for a household in the town was $28,889, and the median income for a family was $39,773. Males had a median income of $30,962 versus $20,000 for females. The per capita income for the town was $15,629. About 1.4% of families and 8.3% of the population were below the poverty line, including 4.1% of those under age 18 and 27.9% of those age 65 or over.

== Government ==
Micro is led by a four-member town commission composed of three commissioners and a mayor all elected at-large. The mayor does not vote in commission meetings. The town maintains its own police department.

== Education ==
- North Johnston High School
- North Johnston Middle School
- Micro Elementary School

== Works cited ==
- Johnson, K. Todd; Barbour, Durwood (1997). Johnston County. Arcadia Publishing. ISBN 9780752408170.
- Powell, William S. (1976). The North Carolina Gazetteer: A Dictionary of Tar Heel Places. Chapel Hill: The University of North Carolina Press. ISBN 9780807812471.
