= Clayton High School (North Carolina) =

American public school in North Carolina

Location
- 600 S. Fayetteville Street; Clayton, North Carolina 27520; United States; 35°38′58″N 78°27′56″W

Information
- Other names: CHS
- Type: Public
- Founded: 1901 (125 years ago)
- School district: Johnston County School District
- CEEB code: 340760
- Principal: Melissa Hubbard
- Faculty: 82.37 (FTE)
- Grades: 9–16
- Enrollment: 1,929 (2024-25)
- Student to teacher ratio: 23.42
- Colors: Blue and white
- Mascot: Comet
- Feeder schools: Clayton Middle, Riverwood Middle, Cleveland Middle
- Website: www.johnston.k12.nc.us/o/chs

Clayton High School is a public high school in Clayton, North Carolina. In 2026, the school received national attention when the valedictorian's graduation speech was cut short by the principal, an incident which went viral on social media.

== History ==
=== 2026 graduation speech incident ===
During the 2026 commencement ceremony on May 28, 2026, valedictorian Leen Hijaz gave a welcome speech. At the closing of her speech, she diverted from approved remarks, saying,

"Before I leave the stage, I have one last thing to say. Every single person here has a voice; we have the privilege to use it when millions around the world are struggling and suffering to be heard. Whether it's the millions suffering in Palestine, Sudan, Congo, Afghanistan and so many other countries around the world, or the families being torn apart by ICE. These are not just an issue there; they are happening there, they're happening right here as I speak. My point is, we're not given a voice to stay silent."

As she concluded her remarks, Hijaz was interrupted and pulled off the stage by Clayton High School Principal Melissa Moore Hubbard, and returned to her seat. The video of the speech and subsequent interruption was live-streamed, and went viral on Instagram, Reddit and TikTok.

On May 29, 2026, Hijaz posted on her personal TikTok account and claimed her high school diploma was being withheld for deviating from her approved speech.

Johnston County Public Schools provided a statement to WRAL, writing, "School administrators intervened in order to maintain the integrity and focus of the program in real time. This action was not about limiting a student’s voice, but about ensuring that a school-sponsored event remained consistent with its intended purpose." On June 2, 2026, Johnston County Public Schools said Hijaz had been awarded her diploma.

On June 2, 2026, the Council on American-Islamic Relations (CAIR) issued a statement condemning Johnston County Public Schools officials for an "effort to silence" Hijaz, writing "Whether one agrees with Leen Hijaz’s views or not, interrupting a valedictorian for calling attention to humanitarian crises and the plight of immigrant families sends a troubling message that certain perspectives are unwelcome in public discourse. Schools should encourage thoughtful civic engagement, not suppress it."

== Notable alumni ==
- Chris Archer, MLB player and 2x All-Star selection
- Gary Clark, NBA player
- Johnny Dutch, USA Track & Field athlete
- Kendra Harrison, world record setting hurdler, silver medalist at 2020 Summer Olympics in women's 100 meter hurdles
- Corey Lee, MLB player
- Evan Phillips, MLB player
- Ed Renfrow, American politician and pastor
- Rodney Rowe, track & field athlete
- James Talacek, professional aquanaut
