= Kenly, North Carolina =

- Town
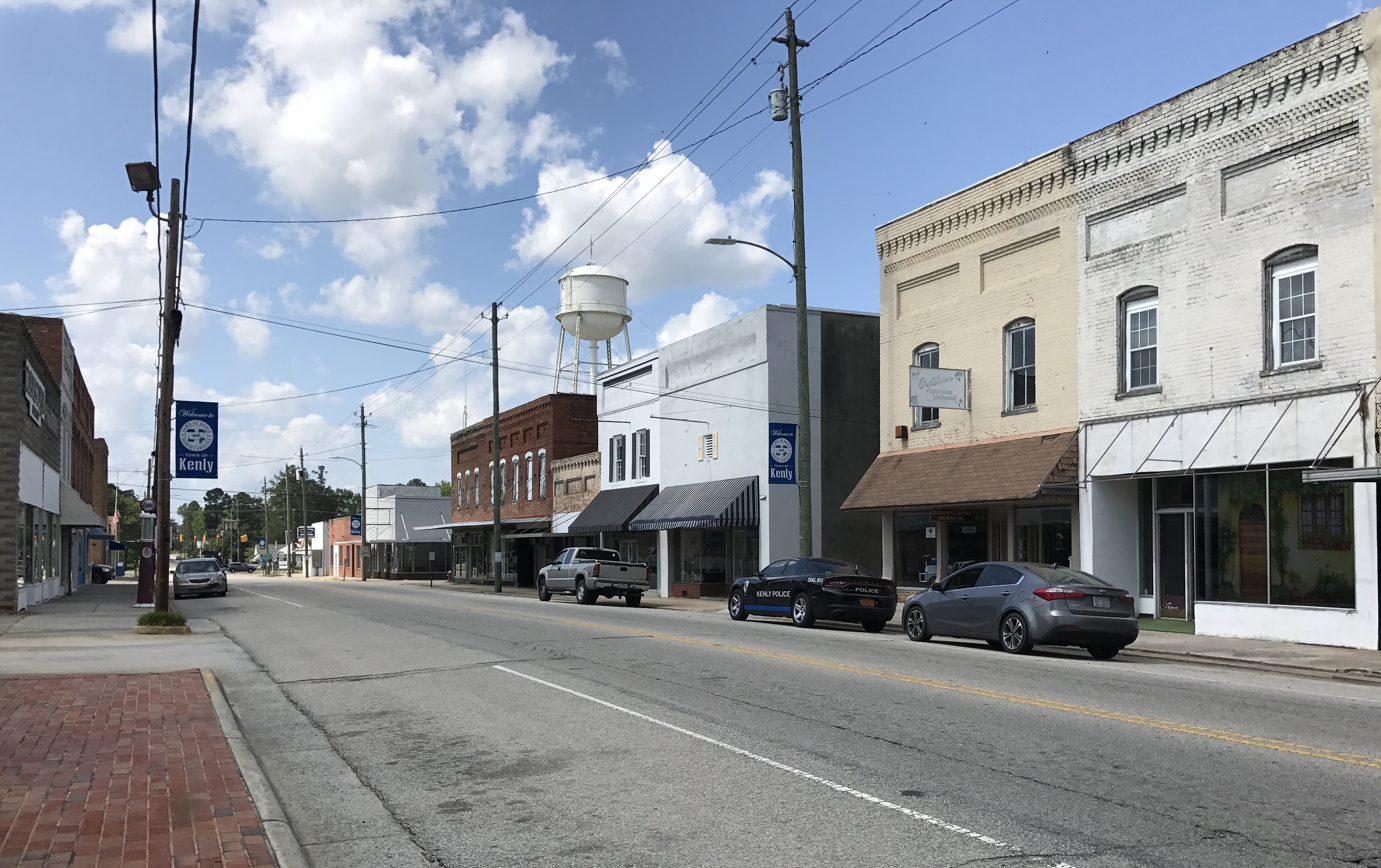

- Flag Seal
- Motto: "Friendly"
- Location within North Carolina Location within the United States
- Coordinates: 35°35′41″N 78°07′30″W
- Country: United States
- State: North Carolina
- Counties: Johnston, Wilson

Area
  - Total: 1.82 sq mi (4.71 km^{2})
  - Land: 1.81 sq mi (4.70 km^{2})
  - Water: 0.0039 sq mi (0.01 km^{2})
- Elevation: 200 ft (61 m)

Population (2020)
  - Total: 1,491
  - Density: 821/sq mi (317.1/km^{2})
- Time zone: UTC-5 (Eastern (EST))
  - Summer (DST): UTC-4 (EDT)
- ZIP code: 27542
- Area code: 919
- FIPS code: 37-35540
- GNIS feature ID: 2405935
- Website: www.townofkenly.com

Kenly is a town in Johnston and Wilson Counties in the U.S. state of North Carolina. It was named for John R. Kenly, Northern Division superintendent of the Atlantic Coast Line Railroad, who later became president of the railroad in 1913. As of the 2020 census, Kenly had a population of 1,491.

== History ==
The community was settled around 1875, developing along the "Short-Cut" rail line of the Wilmington and Weldon Railroad. It was incorporated in 1887 as Kenly, being named for railroad official J. R. Kenly. In 1897, the community's first school, Kenly Academy, a private boarding institution, was established. Kenly High School, a public institution, was opened in 1914. That year also, the town received its first electric service.

In July 2022, all five members of Kenly's police force resigned, citing a "hostile work environment", allegedly created by the newly appointed town manager.

== Geography ==
Kenly is located in eastern Johnston County; a small portion of the town extends into the southwest corner of Wilson County. U.S. Route 301 (Church Street) is the main road through the center of town. North Carolina Highway 222 (Second Street) crosses US 301 in the center of Kenly. Interstate 95 runs along the northwest edge of Kenly, with access from exit 107 (US 301).

According to the United States Census Bureau, Kenly has a total area of 1.6 square miles (4.2 km^{2}), of which 1.609 acres (6,513 m^{2}), or 0.16%, are covered by water.

== Demographics ==
Historical population
Census	Pop.	Note	%±
1890	137		—
1900	260		89.8%
1910	726		179.2%
1920	827		13.9%
1930	965		16.7%
1940	1,095		13.5%
1950	1,129		3.1%
1960	1,147		1.6%
1970	1,370		19.4%
1980	1,433		4.6%
1990	1,549		8.1%
2000	1,569		1.3%
2010	1,339		−14.7%
2020	1,491		11.4%
U.S. Decennial Census

=== 2020 census ===
Kenly racial composition
Race	Number	Percentage
White (non-Hispanic)	704	47.22%
Black or African American (non-Hispanic)	503	33.74%
Native American	2	0.13%
Asian	9	0.6%
Other/multiracial	69	4.63%
Hispanic or Latino	204	13.68%

As of the 2020 United States census, 1,491 people, 744 households, and 416 families were residing in the town.

=== 2000 census ===
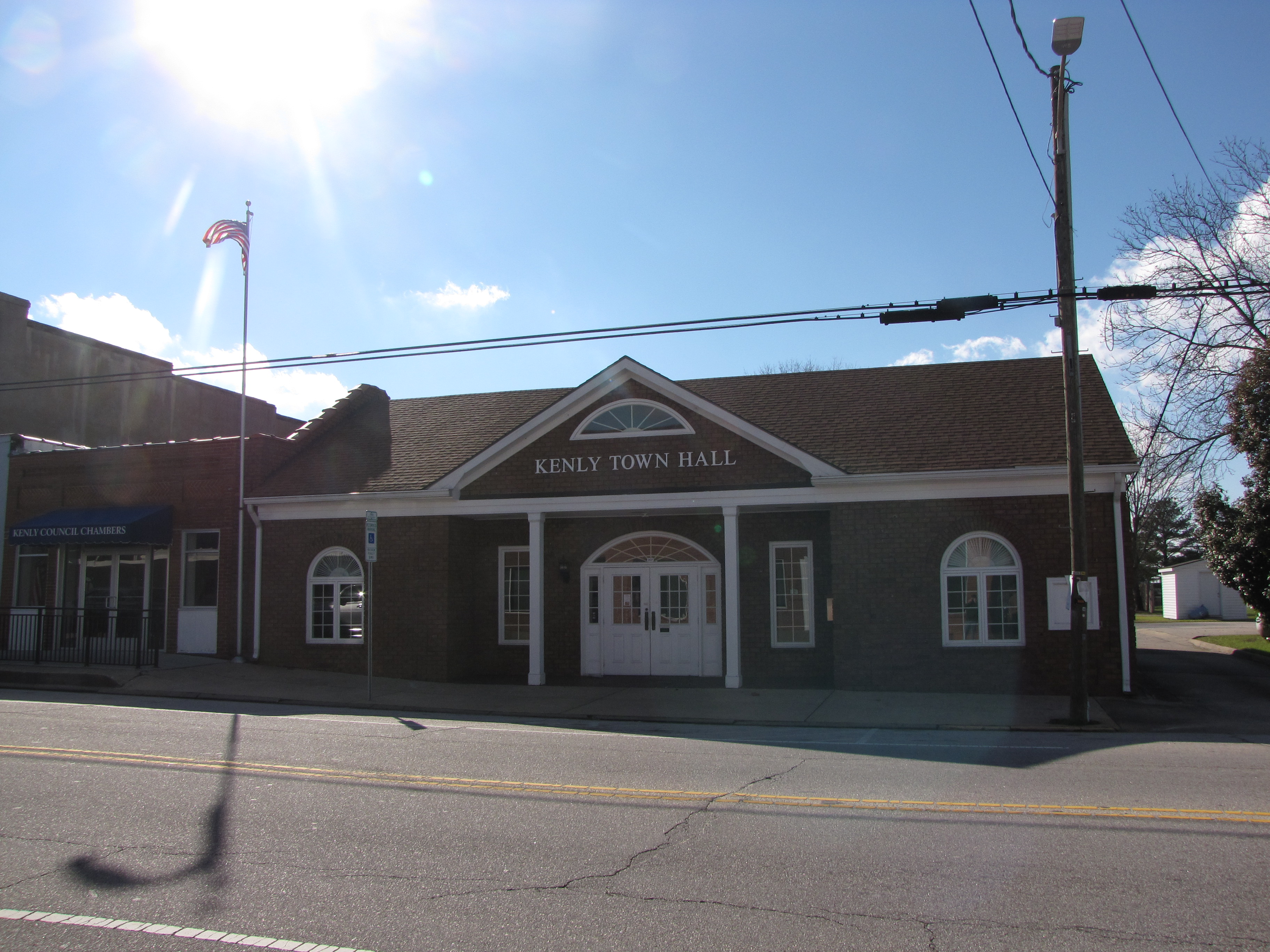
Kenly Town Hall

As of the 2000 census, 1,569 people, 671 households, and 414 families resided in the town. The population density was 1,035.1 inhabitants per square mile (399.7/km^{2}). The 754 housing units had an average density of 497.4 units per square mile (192.0 units/km^{2}). The racial makeup of the town was 55.32% White, 40.60% African American, 0.25% Native American, 0.25% Asian, 2.29% from other races, and 1.27% from two or more races. Hispanics or Latinos of any race were 3.57% of the population.

Of the 671 households, 32.0% had children under 18 living with them, 36.8% were married couples living together, 20.0% had a female householder with no husband present, and 38.2% were not families. About 34.6% of all households were made up of individuals, and 13.9% had someone living alone who was 65 or older. The average household size was 2.34, and the average family size was 3.02.

In the town, the age distribution was 28.1% under 18, 8.5% from 18 to 24, 29.1% from 25 to 44, 20.4% from 45 to 64, and 13.9% who were 65 or older. The median age was 36 years. For every 100 females, there were 90.4 males. For every 100 females 18 and over, there were 82.8 males.

The median income in the town for a household was $20,865 and for a family was $33,214. Males had a median income of $24,250 versus $17,917 for females. The per capita income for the town was $14,181. About 23.3% of families and 25.2% of the population were below the poverty line, including 26.5% of those under 18 and 19.3% of those 65 or over.

== Arts and culture ==
Boyette Slave House was listed on the National Register of Historic Places in 1979.

== Education ==
- Glendale-Kenly Elementary
- North Johnston High School

== Notable people ==
- Al Evans, Major League Baseball player
- The O'Kaysions

== Culture ==
Kenly is the home of the Eastern North Carolina Church of God State Executive Offices and Conference Center.
