= Peacocks Crossroads, North Carolina =

Coordinates: 35°19′13″N 78°27′18″W

- Unincorporated community
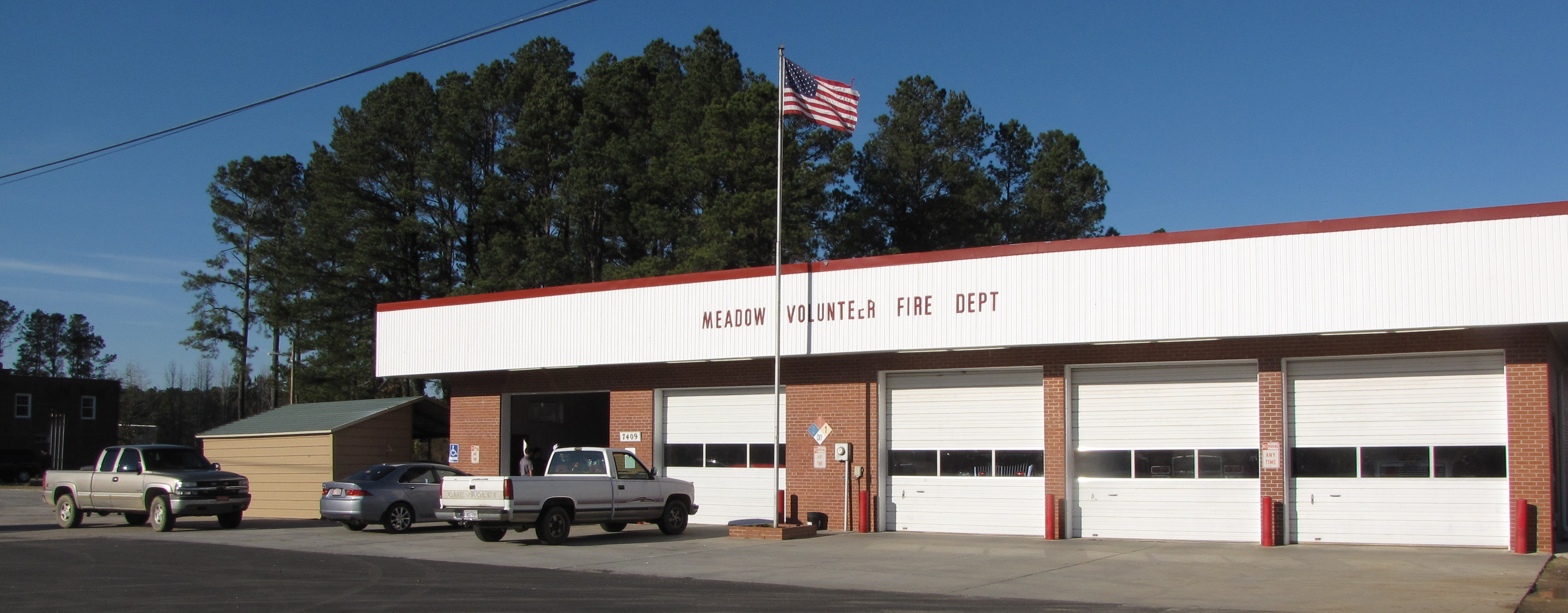
- Meadow Volunteer Fire Department
- Interactive map of Peacocks Crossroads, North Carolina
- Country: United States
- State: North Carolina
- County: Johnston
- Elevation: 200 ft (61 m)
- Time zone: Eastern (EST)
  - Summer (DST): EDT
- GNIS feature ID: 1006325

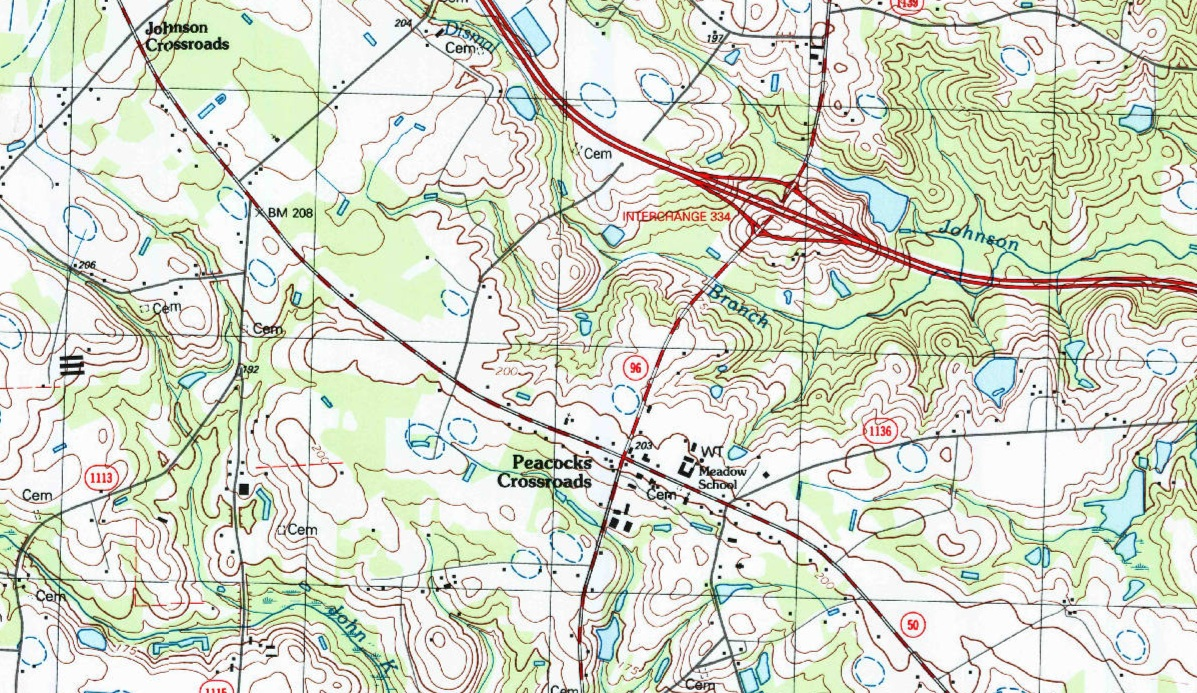
1997 USGS map excerpt showing Peacocks Crossroads near center. Exit 334 of I-40 lays just north of the community.

Meadow (also known as Peacock's Crossroads) is an unincorporated community in Meadow Township, Johnston County, North Carolina, United States, situated at the intersection of North Carolina Highway 96 and North Carolina Highway 50. It lies at an elevation of 200 feet (61 m).

== History ==
It was the home of John William Wood Sr. who owned and donated the land in Peacocks Crossroads on which Meadow School was built.
