= Four Oaks, North Carolina =

- Town
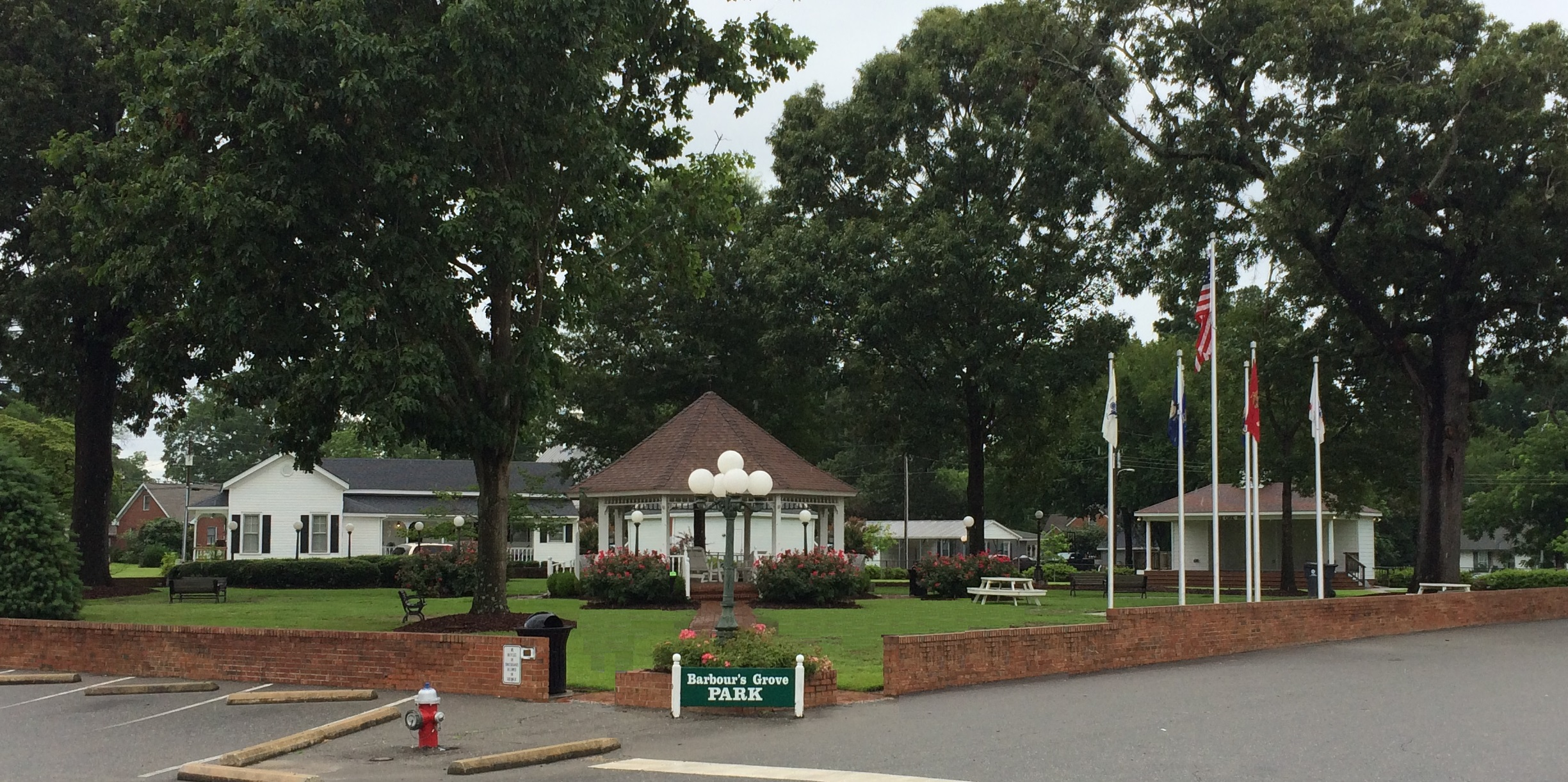
- Barbours Grove Park
- Motto: Come Grow with Us
- Location within North Carolina Location within the United States
- Coordinates: 35°26′41″N 78°25′38″W
- Country: United States
- State: North Carolina
- County: Johnston

Government
  - Type: Mayor-Council
  - Mayor: Vic Medlin (R)

Area
  - Total: 2.45 sq mi (6.34 km^{2})
  - Land: 2.44 sq mi (6.32 km^{2})
  - Water: 0.0077 sq mi (0.02 km^{2})
- Elevation: 197 ft (60 m)

Population (2020)
  - Total: 2,158
  - Density: 884.2/sq mi (341.41/km^{2})
- Time zone: UTC-5 (Eastern (EST))
  - Summer (DST): UTC-4 (EDT)
- ZIP code: 27524
- Area code: 919
- FIPS code: 37-24520
- GNIS feature ID: 2406515
- Website: www.fouroaks-nc.com

Four Oaks is a town in Johnston County, North Carolina, United States. As of the 2020 census, Four Oaks had a population of 2,158.

== History ==
Four Oaks was one of several towns founded along a branch of the Wilmington and Weldon Railroad, completed though Johnston County in 1886.

Four Oaks—named for four oak tree sprouts growing from a stump—incorporated in 1889, and at that time had a post office, a public gin, saw and grist mills, a saloon and general store, a church, and a population of 25. Cotton and tobacco farming were notable industries in the surrounding community.

A brick school for white students opened in 1923. By the 1930s, several rural schools near Four Oaks consolidated, and enrollment at the brick school increased to over 1,900 students, after which the school claimed to be the world's "largest rural consolidated school". An arsonist destroyed the building in 1987. An elementary school for black students opened in 1928.

Street lights were installed in 1907, and by 1910 Four Oaks had a population of 329.

The Four Oaks Commercial Historic District was listed on the National Register of Historic Places in 2006.

== Geography ==
Four Oaks is in central Johnston County, southwest of Smithfield, the county seat. The town limits extend northeast to Holts Lake on Black Creek, a tributary of the Neuse River. U.S. Route 301 (Wellons Street) is the main road through the town, leading northeast 7 miles (11 km) to Smithfield and southwest 8 miles (13 km) to Benson. Interstate 95, running parallel to US 301, passes the southeast corner of Four Oaks, with access from Exit 87.

According to the United States Census Bureau, the town of Four Oaks has a total area of 1.6 square miles (4.2 km^{2}), of which 0.01 square miles (0.02 km^{2}), or 0.42%, are water.

== Demographics ==
Historical population
Census	Pop.	Note	%±
1890	62		—
1900	171		175.8%
1910	329		92.4%
1920	583		77.2%
1930	684		17.3%
1940	828		21.1%
1950	942		13.8%
1960	1,010		7.2%
1970	1,057		4.7%
1980	1,049		−0.8%
1990	1,308		24.7%
2000	1,424		8.9%
2010	1,921		34.9%
2020	2,158		12.3%
2025 (est.)	2,978	▲	38.0%
U.S. Decennial Census

=== 2020 census ===
As of the 2020 census, Four Oaks had a population of 2,158. The median age was 36.9 years. 28.2% of residents were under the age of 18 and 16.8% of residents were 65 years of age or older. For every 100 females there were 84.6 males, and for every 100 females age 18 and over there were 80.9 males age 18 and over.

98.8% of residents lived in urban areas, while 1.2% lived in rural areas.

There were 857 households in Four Oaks, of which 38.7% had children under the age of 18 living in them. Of all households, 39.0% were married-couple households, 15.6% were households with a male householder and no spouse or partner present, and 39.0% were households with a female householder and no spouse or partner present. About 27.3% of all households were made up of individuals and 14.6% had someone living alone who was 65 years of age or older.

There were 955 housing units, of which 10.3% were vacant. The homeowner vacancy rate was 1.6% and the rental vacancy rate was 3.7%.

Racial composition as of the 2020 census
Race	Number	Percent
White	1,344	62.3%
Black or African American	407	18.9%
American Indian and Alaska Native	13	0.6%
Asian	10	0.5%
Native Hawaiian and Other Pacific Islander	0	0.0%
Some other race	237	11.0%
Two or more races	147	6.8%
Hispanic or Latino (of any race)	399	18.5%

=== 2000 census ===
As of the 2000 census, there were 1,424 people, 614 households, and 386 families residing in the town. The population density was 1,341.5 inhabitants per square mile (518.0/km^{2}). There were 667 housing units at an average density of 628.4 per square mile (242.6/km^{2}). The racial makeup of the town was 78.23% White, 16.22% African American, 0.63% Native American, 0.14% Asian, 3.72% from other races, and 1.05% from two or more races. Hispanic or Latino of any race were 7.65% of the population. The oldest living person in Four Oaks is 96 years old.

There were 614 households, out of which 30.3% had children under the age of 18 living with them, 44.3% were married couples living together, 15.3% had a female householder with no husband present, and 37.1% were non-families. 32.6% of all households were made up of individuals, and 14.8% had someone living alone who was 65 years of age or older. The average household size was 2.32 and the average family size was 2.91.

In the town, the population was spread out, with 24.6% under the age of 18, 8.4% from 18 to 24, 28.1% from 25 to 44, 23.7% from 45 to 64, and 15.2% who were 65 years of age or older. The median age was 37 years. For every 100 females, there were 83.7 males. For every 100 females age 18 and over, there were 78.4 males.

The median income for a household in the town was $29,427, and the median income for a family was $41,875. Males had a median income of $31,875 versus $25,444 for females. The per capita income for the town was $17,473. About 12.8% of families and 17.5% of the population were below the poverty line, including 23.0% of those under age 18 and 21.1% of those age 65 or over.

== Historic district ==
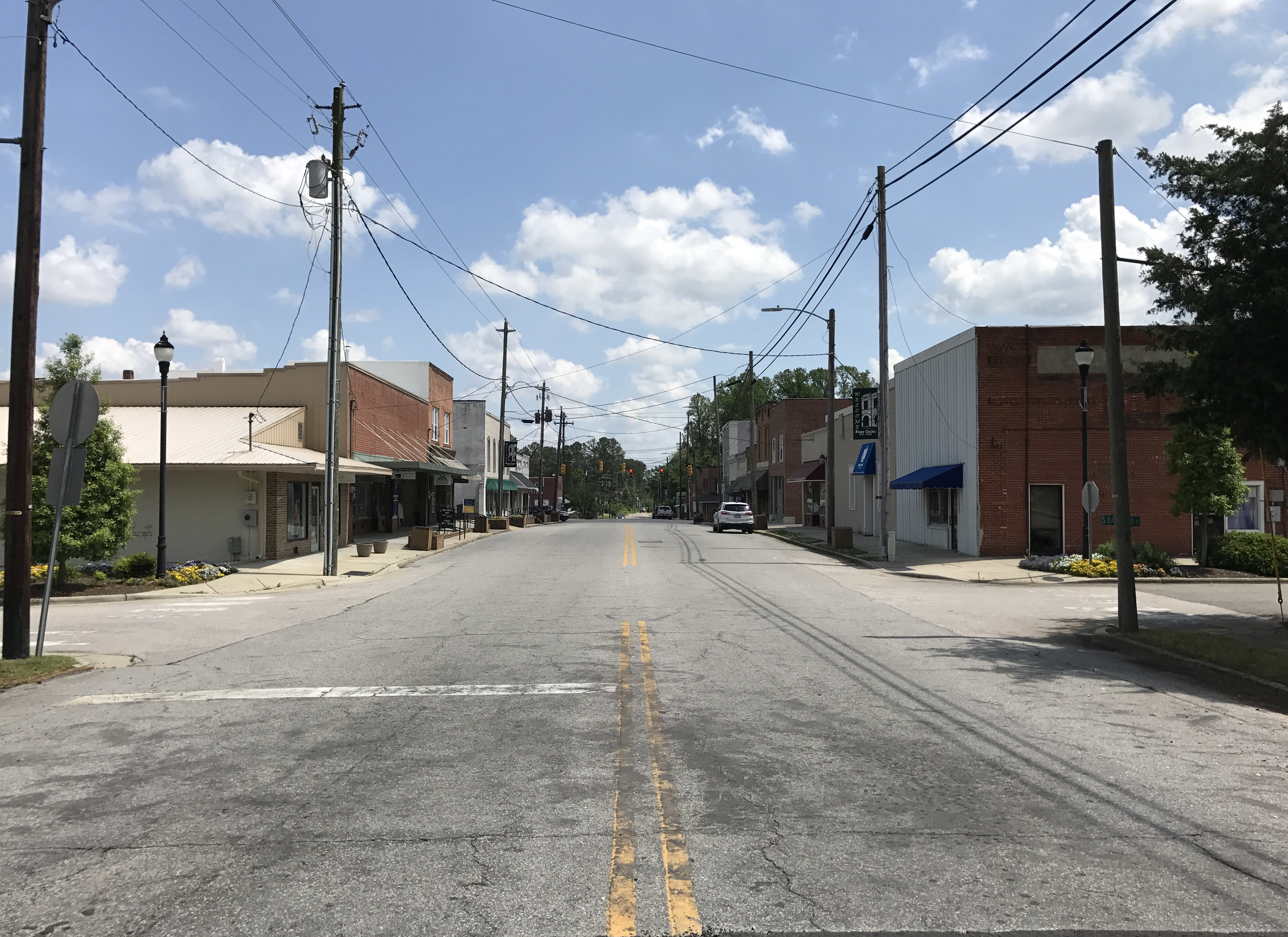
Four Oaks Commercial Historic District

The Four Oaks Commercial Historic District consists of 29 buildings dating from the late 19th and early 20th centuries. Some structures are built in the Mission Revival style. The district was listed with the National Trust for Historic Preservation in 2006.

== Arts and culture ==
The Four Oaks Acorn Festival features live entertainment, vendors, children's activities, a barbecue competition, and an antique car and tractor show.

== Education ==
- Four Oaks Elementary School
- Four Oaks Middle School
- South Johnston High School
