= Johnston Community College =

Public college in Smithfield, North Carolina, US

Coordinates: 35.5005°N 78.3370°W

- Type: Public community college
- Established: 1969
- Parent institution: NCCCS
- Accreditation: SACS
- Chairman: Lyn Austin
- President: Vern Lindquist
- Administrative staff: 650
- Undergraduates: 6,000
- Location: Smithfield, North Carolina, United States
- Campus: Suburban 175-acre (0.71 km^{2})
- Colors: Royal Blue and Silver
- Nickname: Jaguars
- Website: www.johnstoncc.edu

Johnston Community College (JCC) is a public community college in Smithfield, North Carolina. It is located 30 miles (48 km) east of Raleigh, near the junction of I-95 and US 70. The 175-acre (0.71 km^{2}) main campus has 11 student buildings, an auditorium capable of seating 1,011 people, a 4,800-square-foot multi-use/banquet hall, four vocational shops/labs, a 16-acre (65,000 m^{2}) arboretum, and three ponds. Johnston Community College has off-campus centers throughout Johnston County, including the Cleveland Center, the Workforce Development Center, and the Howell Woods Environmental Learning Center, a 2,800-acre (11 km^{2}) wildlife preserve, and a teaching facility.

JCC is the home of the North Carolina Truck Driver Training school, the oldest truck driver training program in the United States. JCC also offers the programs of the Johnston County Career and Technical Leadership Academy.

== Accreditation ==
Johnston Community College is a member of the North Carolina Community College System and is accredited by the Commission on Colleges of the Southern Association of Colleges and Schools to award the certificate, diploma, and associate degree.

== Athletics ==
The athletic teams at Johnston Community College, known as the Jaguars compete in two intercollegiate sports:

- Men's and women's golf
- Men's and women's basketball

The men's basketball team was revived in 2016 along with the founding of a women's basketball team. Home games are held in the heart of Johnston County at the SRAC.

Johnston Community College is a part of the NJCAA.

== History ==
In 2025, JCC received a Golden LEAF Foundation grant of over $3.6 million to provide new employee training at Vulcan Elements starting in 2026, to prepare for the company's new neodymium magnet production facility that they plan to open in Benson, North Carolina.

== Notable alumni ==
- Tony Braswell, politician and businessman
