= Benson, North Carolina =

- Town
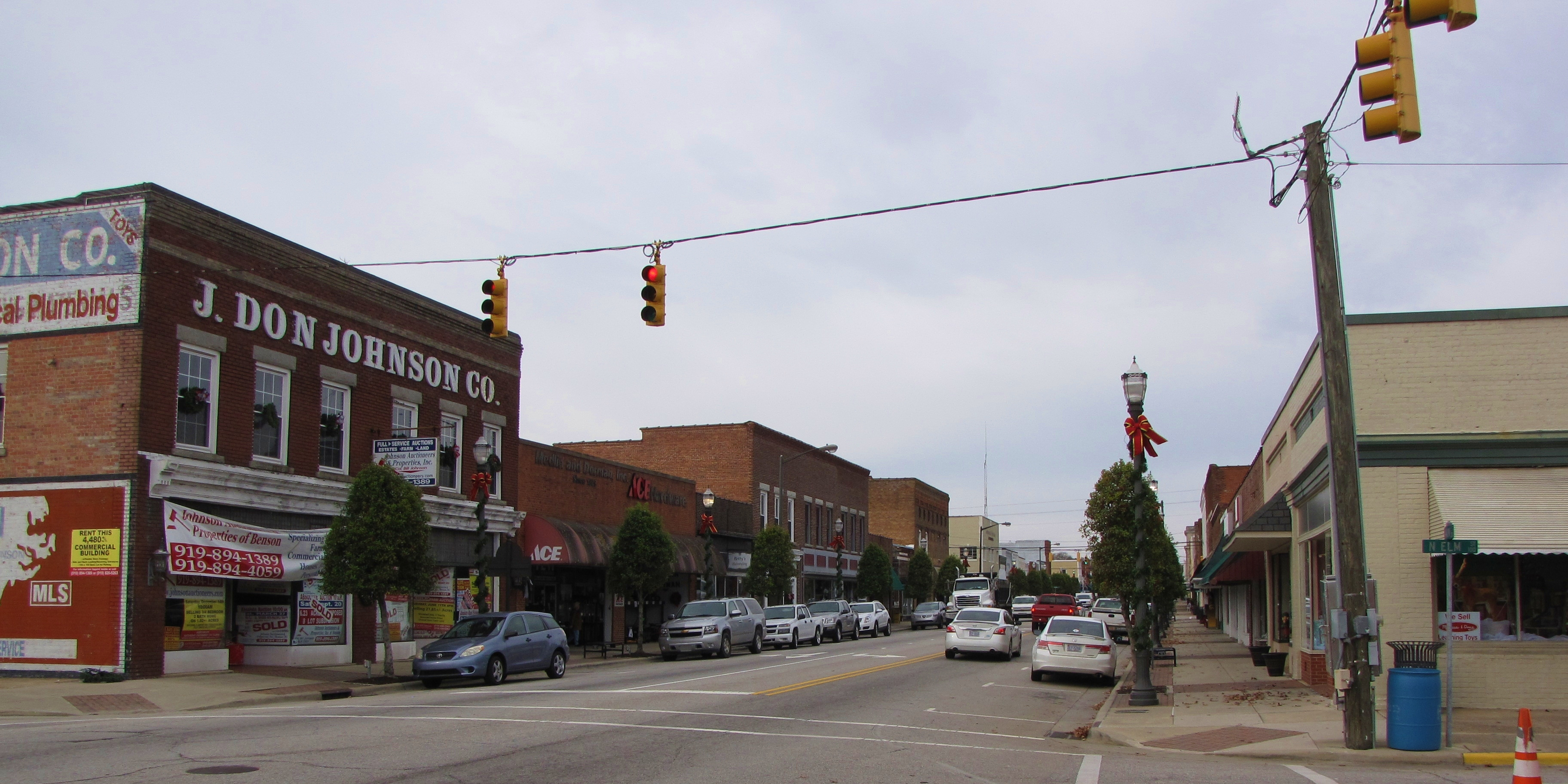
- Downtown Benson
- Motto: "The Center of Attention"
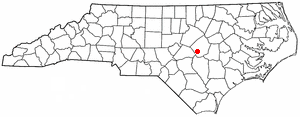
- Location of Benson, North Carolina
- Coordinates: 35°23′10″N 78°32′37″W
- Country: United States
- State: North Carolina
- County: Johnston

Government
  - Mayor: Max Raynor (R)
  - Town Manager: Kimberly Pickett

Area
  - Total: 2.81 sq mi (7.28 km^{2})
  - Land: 2.80 sq mi (7.26 km^{2})
  - Water: 0.0039 sq mi (0.01 km^{2})
- Elevation: 236 ft (72 m)

Population (2020)
  - Total: 3,967
  - Density: 1,414.3/sq mi (546.07/km^{2})
- Time zone: UTC-5 (Eastern (EST))
  - Summer (DST): UTC-4 (EDT)
- ZIP code: 27504
- Area codes: 919 and 984
- FIPS code: 37-05040
- GNIS feature ID: 2405242
- Website: www.townofbenson.com

Benson is a town in Johnston County, North Carolina, United States, near the intersection of Interstates 95 and 40. Benson celebrates Mule Days on the fourth Saturday of September, a festival that attracts over 60,000 people each year. At the 2020 census, the population was 3,967.

== History ==
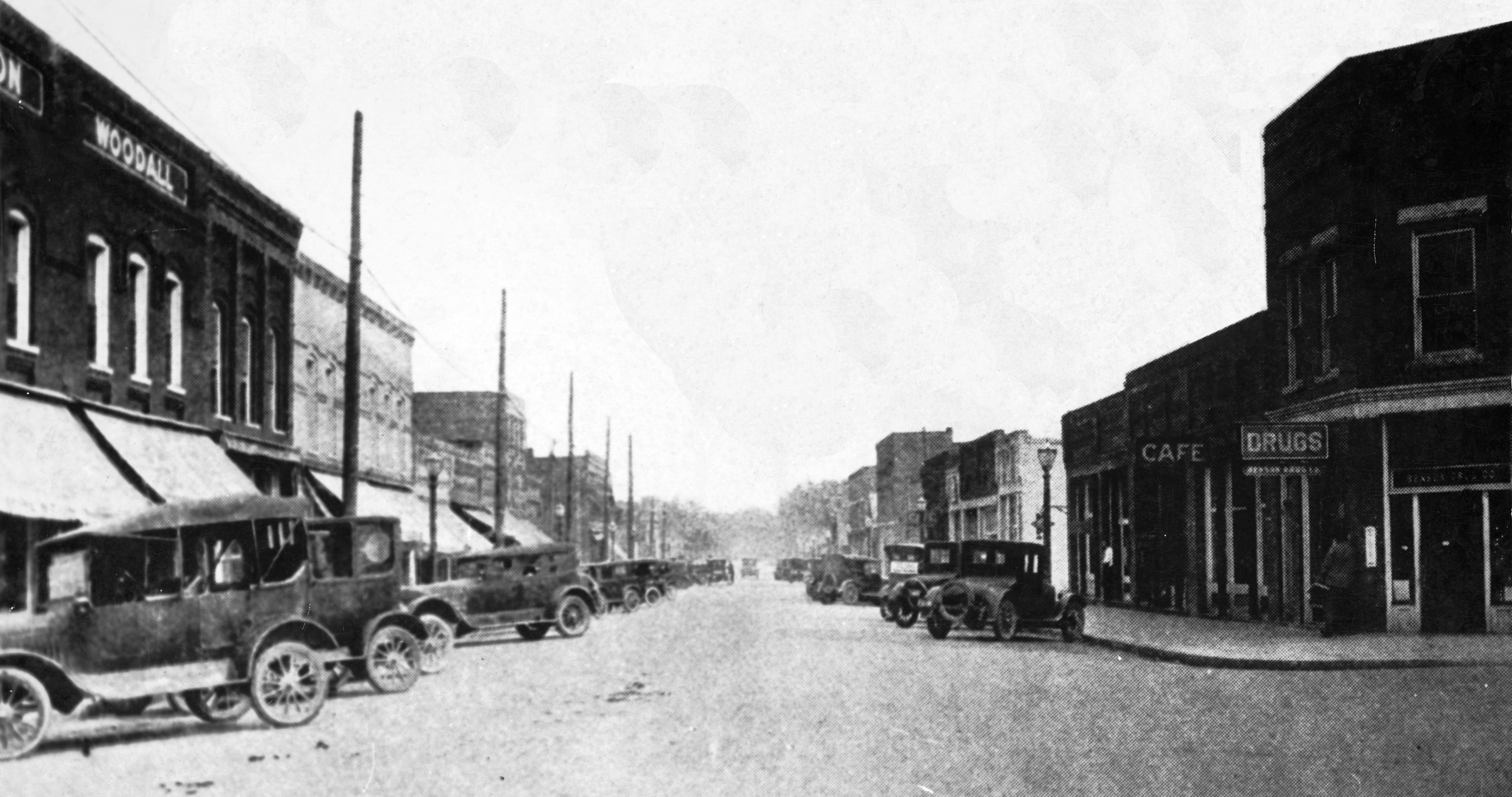
Main Street, 1925

The town of Benson, which derives its name from early settler Alfred Monroe ("Mim") Benson, owes much of its historical development to the railroad line which passed through the present location in town in 1886 on its route between Fayetteville and Contentnea. More information on the history of Benson and the surrounding communities may be found at the new Benson Museum of Local History located at 102 W. Main Street, next to the Mary Duncan Library.

Mr. Benson's purchase of a 402-acre (1.63 km^{2}) tract along the Smithfield-Fayetteville Road in 1874 initiated the settlement of the area now known as Benson. During the 1880s Benson sold portions of his original tract to incoming settlers, many of whom were farmers. Benson was incorporated in 1887 and soon attracted a number of entrepreneurs wishing to take advantage of this new town along an important transportation route.

A prominent early resident of the Benson area was John William Wood Sr. (December 28, 1855 - October 31, 1928) who rode to Benson each morning on a mule and wagon from his home at Peacocks Crossroads near Meadow. After having served on the Board of Education and as a county commissioner, where he was known to be a watchdog of the treasury, he was elected to a term in the State House of Representatives in 1927. Meadow School was built on land donated by him.

The Benson Historic District and Hannah's Creek Primitive Baptist Church are listed on the National Register of Historic Places.

Benson is home to Alpha Company 230th BSB, who were deployed in 2009 in support of Operation Iraqi Freedom.

The mayor Jerry Medlin died on November 13, 2024 at the age of 87 after revealing that he had cancer.

== Geography ==
Benson is in southeastern Johnston County, less than 1 mile (1.6 km) from the Harnett County line. U.S. Route 301 (Wall Street) passes through the center of the town, leading northeast 15 miles (24 km) to Smithfield, the Johnston county seat, and southwest 6 miles (10 km) to Dunn. North Carolina Highway 50 is Benson's Main Street, crossing US 301 in the center of town and leading north 24 miles (39 km) to Garner and southeast 15 miles (24 km) to Newton Grove. Interstate 95 passes through the southeastern side of Benson and runs parallel to US 301, connecting Fayetteville and Rocky Mount, while Interstate 40 passes northeast of the town and runs parallel to NC 50, leading to Raleigh and Wilmington.

According to the United States Census Bureau, Benson has a total area of 2.8 square miles (7.2 km^{2}), of which 0.004 square miles (0.01 km^{2}), or 0.16%, is water.

== Demographics ==
Historical population
Census	Pop.	Note	%±
1890	191		—
1900	384		101.0%
1910	800		108.3%
1920	1,123		40.4%
1930	1,522		35.5%
1940	1,837		20.7%
1950	2,102		14.4%
1960	2,355		12.0%
1970	2,267		−3.7%
1980	2,792		23.2%
1990	2,810		0.6%
2000	2,923		4.0%
2010	3,311		13.3%
2020	3,967		19.8%
2025 (est.)	4,660	▲	17.5%
U.S. Decennial Census

=== 2020 census ===
As of the 2020 census, Benson had a population of 3,967. The median age was 36.6 years. 27.3% of residents were under the age of 18 and 18.2% of residents were 65 years of age or older. For every 100 females there were 80.6 males, and for every 100 females age 18 and over there were 78.3 males age 18 and over.

0.0% of residents lived in urban areas, while 100.0% lived in rural areas.

There were 1,575 households in Benson, including 943 family households. Of all households, 33.8% had children under the age of 18 living in them, 36.8% were married-couple households, 17.3% were households with a male householder and no spouse or partner present, and 38.5% were households with a female householder and no spouse or partner present. About 32.1% of all households were made up of individuals and 15.3% had someone living alone who was 65 years of age or older.

There were 1,763 housing units, of which 10.7% were vacant. The homeowner vacancy rate was 3.5% and the rental vacancy rate was 7.4%.

Benson racial composition
Race	Number	Percentage
White (non-Hispanic)	2,143	54.02%
Black or African American (non-Hispanic)	988	24.91%
Native American	26	0.66%
Asian	20	0.5%
Pacific Islander	1	0.03%
Other/Mixed	169	4.26%
Hispanic or Latino	620	15.63%

=== 2010 census ===
As of the census of 2010, there were 3,311 people, 1,301 households, and 787 families residing in the town. The population density was 1,402 inhabitants per square mile (541/km^{2}). There were 1,554 housing units at an average density of 650 per square mile (250/km^{2}). The racial makeup of the town was 57.61% White, 34.04% African American, 0.48% Native American, 0.44% Asian, 0.07% Pacific Islander, 5.78% from other races, and 1.57% from two or more races. 7.29% of the population were Hispanic or Latino of any race.

There were 1,230 households, out of which 29.7% had children under the age of 18 living with them, 37.0% were married couples living together, 20.6% had a female householder with no husband present, and 38.4% were non-families. 34.2% of all households were made up of individuals, and 17.1% had someone living alone who was 65 years of age or older. The average household size was 2.38 and the average family size was 3.05.

In the town, the population was spread out, with 27.5% under the age of 18, 9.5% from 18 to 24, 27.6% from 25 to 44, 20.1% from 45 to 64, and 15.2% who were 65 years of age or older. The median age was 34 years. For every 100 females, there were 83.0 males. For every 100 females age 18 and over, there were 74.0 males.

The median income for a household in the town was $26,582, and the median income for a family was $32,277. Males had a median income of $29,375 versus $20,045 for females. The per capita income for the town was $14,350. 25.0% of the population and 20.2% of families were below the poverty line. 39.7% of those under the age of 18 and 23.2% of those 65 and older were living below the poverty line.

== Education ==
Schools located in Benson include Benson Elementary School, Meadow Elementary School, Benson Middle School, and South Johnston High School.

== Notable people ==
- Herman Allen, Serial killer; executed in North Carolina's gas chamber in 1942
- Jimmy Capps, guitarist, member of The Grand Ole Opry, North Carolina Music Hall of Fame, Musicians Hall of Fame, lived at 216 W. Church St.
- Drew Herring, NASCAR Cup Series driver
- Hunter Johnson, composer and musician; composed music for some of Martha Graham's ballets
- John Medlin, finance executive. CEO of Wachovia from 1977 to 1993
- Earl Stephenson, Major League Baseball pitcher during the 1970s
- Shelby Stephenson, poet and musician; installed as Poet Laureate of North Carolina in February 2015
- Ray Tanner, athletic director for the University of South Carolina; head coach of South Carolina Gamecocks baseball team from 1995 to 2012; won consecutive national championships in 2010 and 2011
- Robert D. Warren Sr., educator and North Carolina state senator
- John William Wood Sr., one of the founders of Benson, North Carolina
