= Johnston County, North Carolina =

County in North Carolina, United States

- County
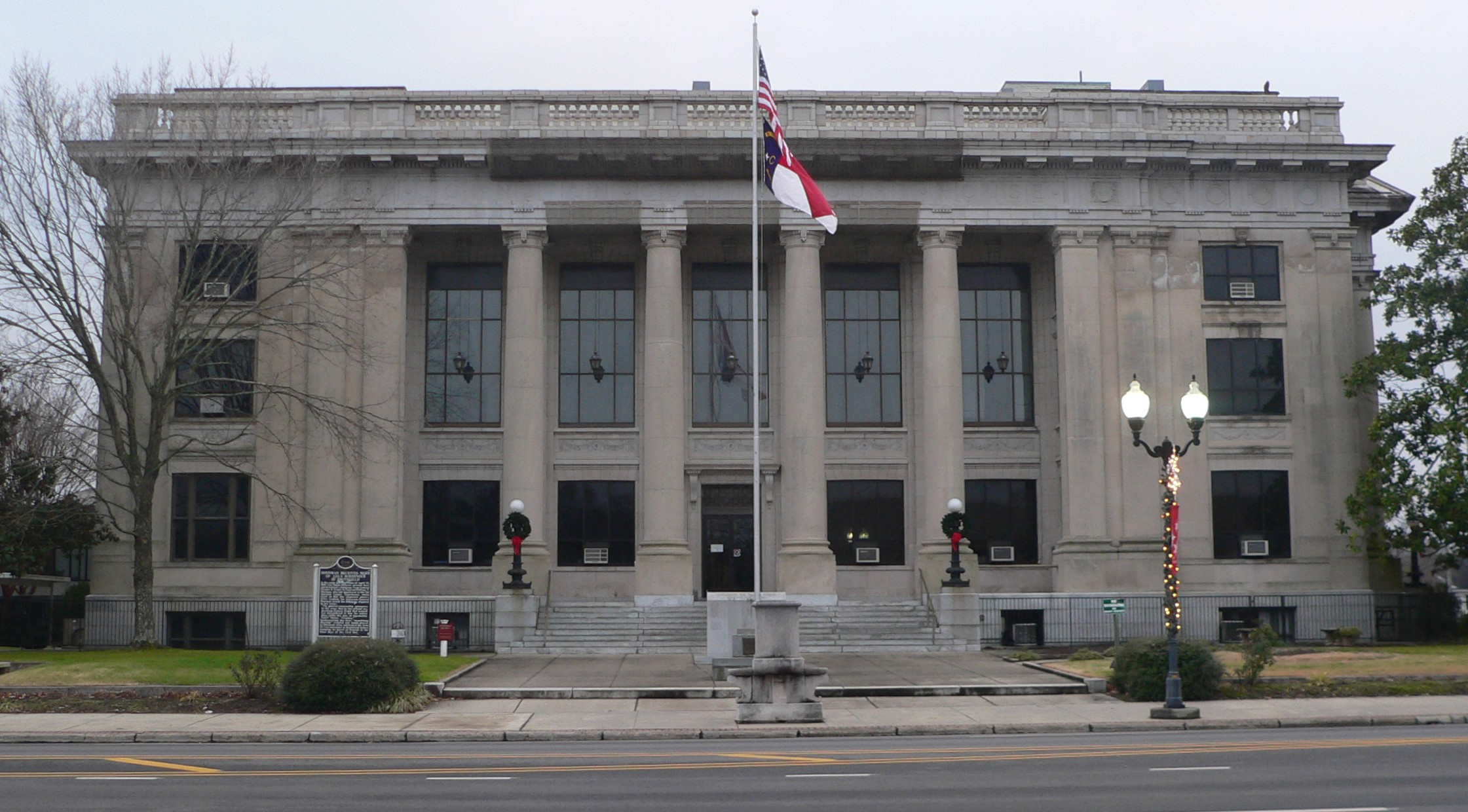
- Johnston County Courthouse in Smithfield

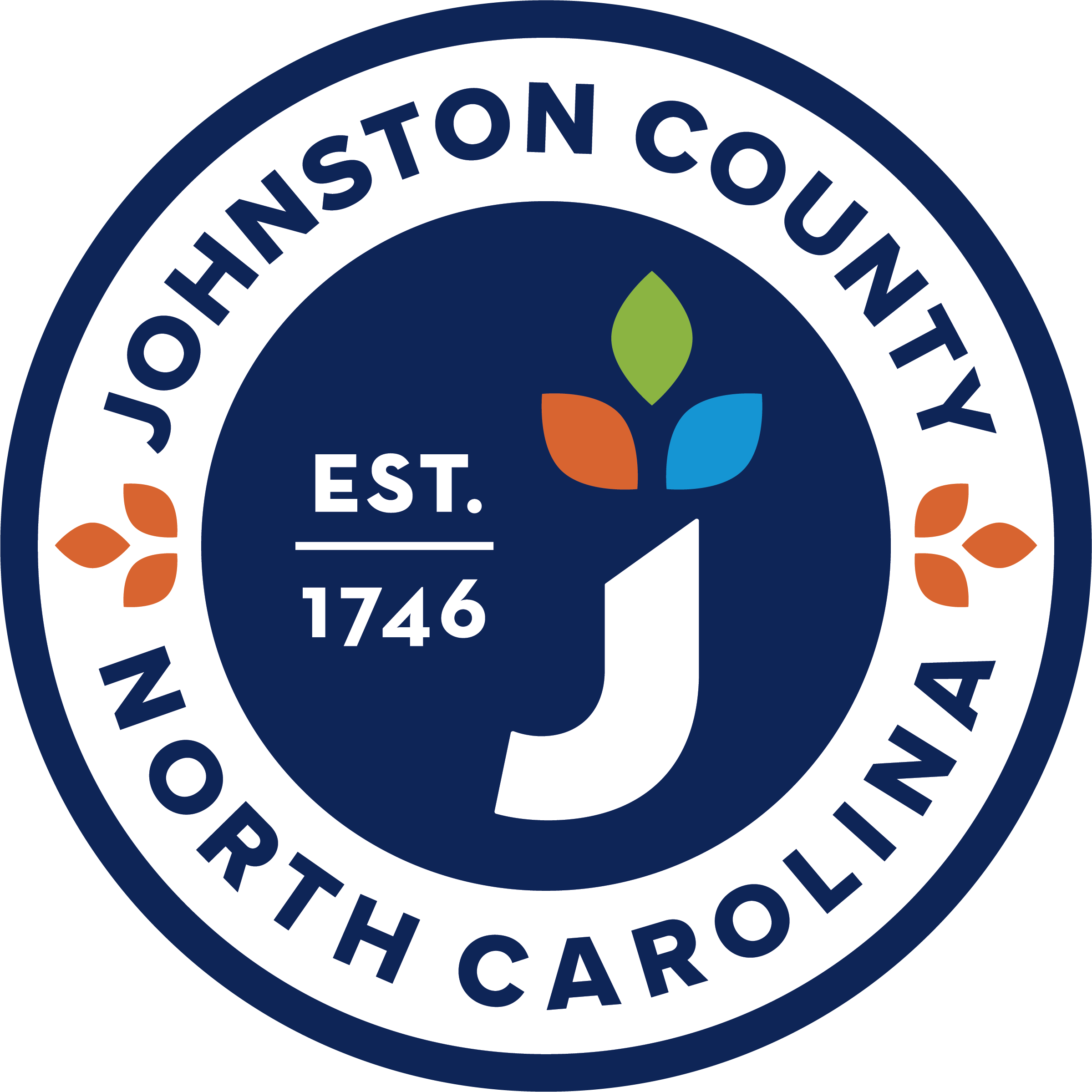
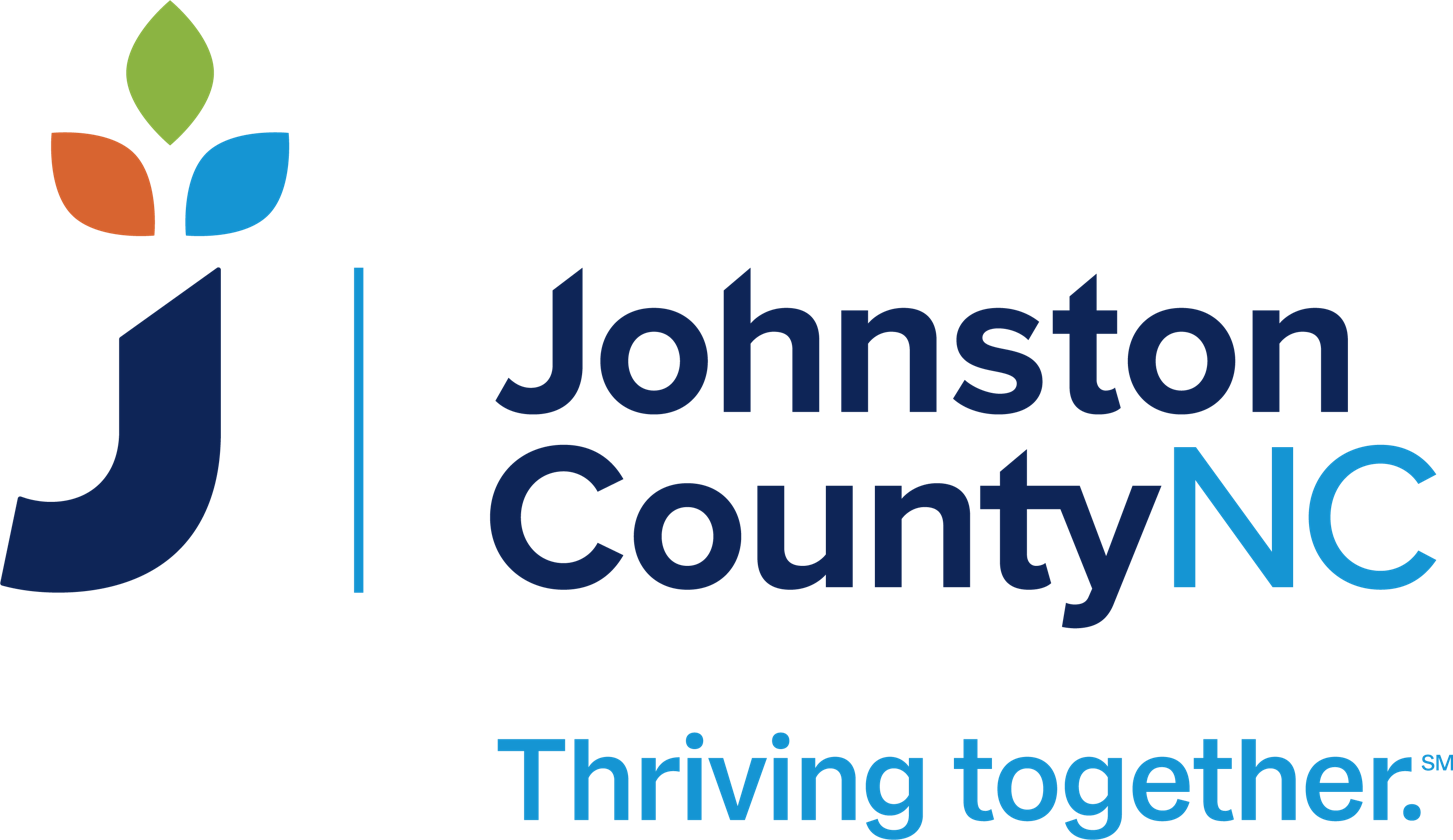
- Seal Logo

- Location within the U.S. state of North Carolina
- Interactive map of Johnston County, North Carolina
- Coordinates: 35.51°N 78.37°W
- Country: United States
- State: North Carolina
- Established: June 28, 1746 (280 years ago)
- Named for: Gabriel Johnston
- Seat: Smithfield
- Largest community: Clayton

Area
  - Total: 795.65 sq mi (2,060.7 km^{2})
  - Land: 792.02 sq mi (2,051.3 km^{2})
  - Water: 3.63 sq mi (9.4 km^{2}) 0.46%

Population (2020)
  - Total: 215,999
  - Estimate (2025): 256,448 ▲
  - Density: 272.72/sq mi (105.30/km^{2})
- Time zone: UTC−5 (Eastern)
  - Summer (DST): UTC−4 (EDT)
- ZIP Codes: 27501, 27504, 27520, 27524, 27527, 27529, 27542, 27555, 27557, 27568, 27569, 27576, 27577, 27591, 27592, 27597, 27603, 28334, 28366
- Area code: 919, 984
- Congressional district: 13th
- Website: johnstonnc.gov

Johnston County is a county located in the U.S. state of North Carolina. As of the 2020 census, its population was 215,999. Its county seat is Smithfield. Johnston County is included in the Raleigh-Cary, NC metropolitan statistical area, which is also included in the Raleigh-Durham-Cary, NC combined statistical area, which had an estimated population of 2,368,947 in 2023.

== History ==
=== Early history ===
Johnston County and St. Patrick's Parish were established on June 28, 1746, from the upper part of Craven County, North Carolina. The county was named after Gabriel Johnston, governor of North Carolina from 1734 to 1752. On March 1, 1752, part of Granville, Johnston, and Bladen counties were combined to form Orange County and St. Matthew's Parish. On November 23, 1758, Johnston County was divided between the parish of St. Patrick and the parish of St. Stephen, St. Patrick's Parish becoming Dobbs County. On December 5, 1770, parts of Johnston, Cumberland, and Orange counties were combined to form Wake County and St. Margaret's Parish. Finally, on February 13, 1855, parts of Edgecombe, Nash, Johnston, and Wayne counties were combined to form Wilson County. Most colonial settlers in Johnston County were subsistence farmers. A few grew tobacco as a cash crop or raised pigs and cattle, which were sold in Virginia. Smithfield was the westernmost freight port on the Neuse River, and in 1770, the provincial government erected a tobacco warehouse there to store the crop before it was shipped out.

=== 19th century ===
Eli Whitney's cotton gin was introduced in the county around 1804, leading cotton to become the area's leading cash crop. Production for sale at markets remained low before the 1850s due to poor transportation links with other parts of the state. In 1856, the North Carolina Railroad was completed, connecting Johnston County with major urban areas. As result, farming for sale increased, lumber and turpentine industries developed, and the towns of Princeton, Pine Level, Selma, and Clayton were eventually created. About 1,500 Johnstonian men fought in the American Civil War, of whom about a third died. Lingering political tensions and the emancipation of slaves created social and economic turmoil. The new state constitution of 1868 created the county's first townships, which were altered up until 1913. In 1886, the "Short-Cut" line of the Wilmington and Weldon Railroad was laid through Johnston, eventually giving rise to the towns of Kenly, Micro, Four Oaks, and Benson. The Panic of 1893 caused cotton prices to sharply decline, leading area farmers to switch to bright leaf tobacco as their primary cash crop. A new tobacco market was established in Smithfield in 1898, and the county's first bank was created.

=== 20th century ===
Within several years, cotton mills were erected in Smithfield, Clayton, and Selma. During World War I, a brief surge in tobacco and cotton prices brought a boom to the local economy. As a result, the county embarked on a school-construction campaign and consolidated all public schools under a single county system. In the 1920s, the state built the county's first two paved highways, and shortly thereafter, many towns began paving their main streets. While local commerce enjoyed significant success during the decade, area farmers struggled due to drops in tobacco and cotton prices. The Wall Street Crash of 1929 and ensuing Great Depression caused all banks in the county to close. Following the passage of a state bond issue in 1949, most roads in the county and town streets were paved.

== Geography ==
According to the U.S. Census Bureau, the county has a total area of 795.65 square miles (2,060.7 km^{2}), of which 3.63 square miles (9.4 km^{2}) (0.46%) are covered by water.

=== State and local protected areas ===
- Bentonville Battlefield State Historic Site
- Clemmons Educational State Forest (part)
- Flower Hill Nature Preserve (part)
- Howell Woods Environmental Learning Center
- Wild Bills Western Town - Shadowhawk

=== Major water bodies ===
- Black Creek
- Buckhorn Reservoir
- Buffalo Creek
- Hannahs Creek
- Holts Lake
- Little Creek
- Little River
- Middle Creek
- Mingo Swamp
- Mill Creek
- Moccasin Creek
- Neuse River
- Sassarixa Swamp
- Snipers Creek
- Swift Creek

=== Adjacent counties ===
- Wake County – northwest
- Franklin County – north
- Nash County – northeast
- Wilson County – east
- Wayne County – southeast
- Sampson County – south
- Harnett County – southwest

=== Major highways ===
- I-40
- I-42 / Future I-42
- I-95
- I-540 / NC 540 Toll
- Future I-587
- US 70
- US 70 Alt.
- US 70 Bus.
- US 264
- US 264 Alt.
- US 301
- US 701
- NC 27
- NC 39
- NC 42
- NC 50
- NC 55
- NC 96
- NC 210
- NC 222
- NC 231
- NC 242

=== Major infrastructure ===
- Johnston Regional Airport
- Selma Union Depot

== Demographics ==
Historical population
Census	Pop.	Note	%±
1790	5,691		—
1800	6,301		10.7%
1810	6,867		9.0%
1820	9,607		39.9%
1830	10,938		13.9%
1840	10,599		−3.1%
1850	13,726		29.5%
1860	15,656		14.1%
1870	16,897		7.9%
1880	23,461		38.8%
1890	27,239		16.1%
1900	32,250		18.4%
1910	41,401		28.4%
1920	48,998		18.3%
1930	57,621		17.6%
1940	63,798		10.7%
1950	65,906		3.3%
1960	62,936		−4.5%
1970	61,737		−1.9%
1980	70,599		14.4%
1990	81,306		15.2%
2000	121,965		50.0%
2010	168,878		38.5%
2020	215,999		27.9%
2025 (est.)	256,448	▲	18.7%
U.S. Decennial Census; 1790–1960 1900–1990; 1990–2000 2010 2020

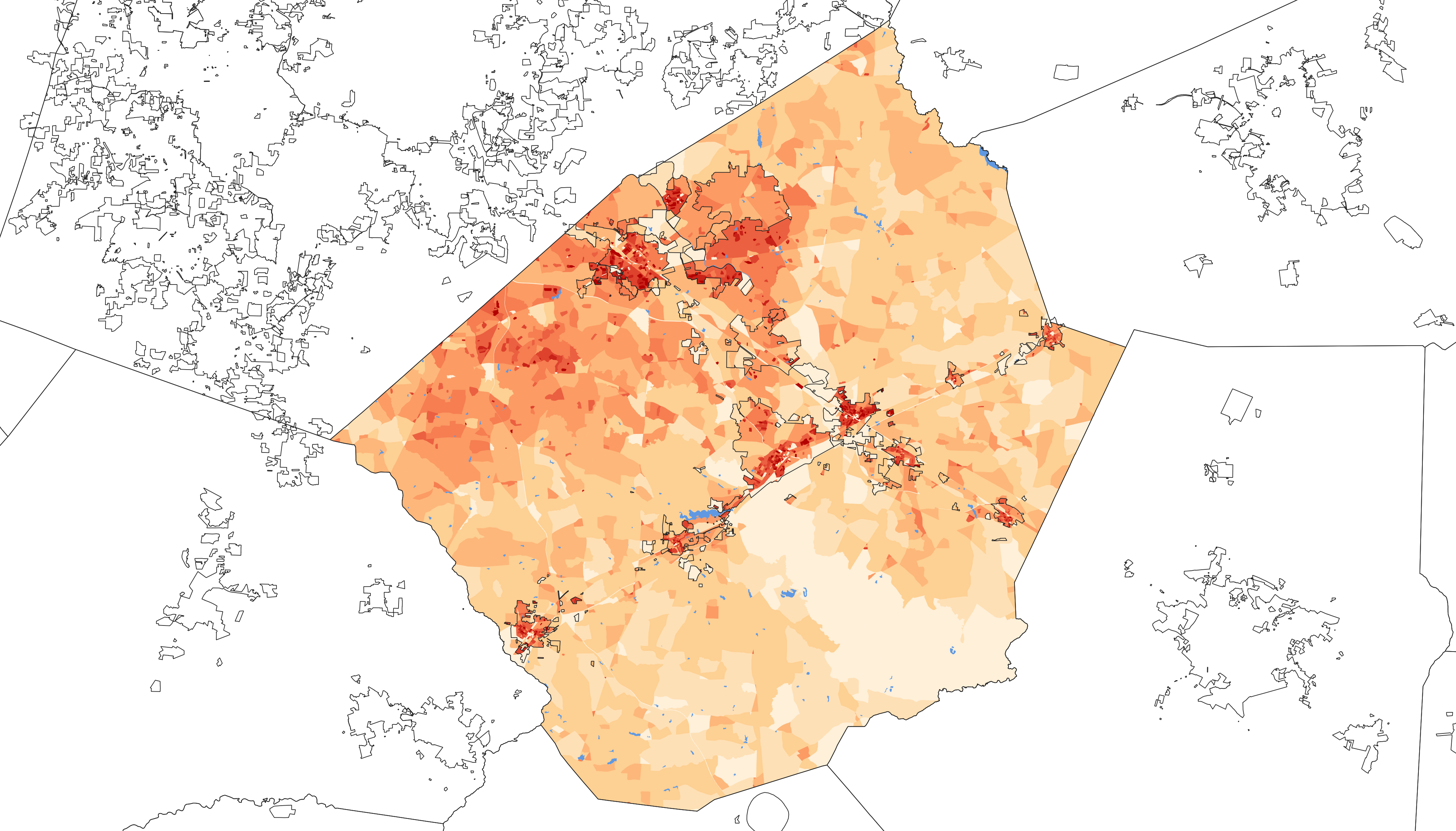
2020 population density of Johnston County NC by census block

=== 2020 census ===
Johnston County, North Carolina – Racial and ethnic composition Note: the US Census treats Hispanic/Latino as an ethnic category. This table excludes Latinos from the racial categories and assigns them to a separate category. Hispanics/Latinos may be of any race.
Race / Ethnicity (NH = Non-Hispanic)	Pop 1980	Pop 1990	Pop 2000	Pop 2010	Pop 2020	% 1980	% 1990	% 2000	% 2010	% 2020
White alone (NH)	56,066	65,370	91,870	117,869	136,464	79.41%	80.40%	75.32%	69.80%	63.18%
Black or African American alone (NH)	13,730	14,331	18,971	25,082	33,041	19.45%	17.63%	15.55%	14.85%	15.30%
Native American or Alaska Native alone (NH)	95	174	417	689	880	0.13%	0.21%	0.34%	0.41%	0.41%
Asian alone (NH)	81	151	355	976	1,831	0.11%	0.19%	0.29%	0.58%	0.85%
Native Hawaiian or Pacific Islander alone (NH)	x	x	27	33	71	x	x	0.02%	0.02%	0.03%
Other race alone (NH)	17	18	96	231	913	0.02%	0.02%	0.08%	0.14%	0.42%
Multiracial (NH)	x	x	789	2,184	8,399	x	x	0.65%	1.29%	3.89%
Hispanic or Latino (any race)	610	1,262	9,440	21,814	34,400	0.86%	1.55%	7.74%	12.92%	15.93%
Total	70,599	81,306	121,965	168,878	215,999	100.00%	100.00%	100.00%	100.00%	100.00%

As of the 2020 census, the county had 215,999 people, 79,053 households, and 53,743 families residing in the county.

The median age was 38.0 years; 25.9% of the residents were under 18 and 13.9% were 65 or older. The female/male ratio was 1:0.958 males overall and 1:0.930 males for those 18 and over.

The racial makeup of the county was 65.9% White, 15.6% Black or African American, 0.8% American Indian and Alaska Native, 0.9% Asian, <0.1% Native Hawaiian and Pacific Islander, 8.4% from some other race, and 8.3% from two or more races. Hispanic or Latino residents of any race comprised 15.9% of the population.

About 47.0% of residents lived in urban areas, while 53.0% lived in rural areas.

Of the 79,053 households in the county, 37.3% had children under 18 living in them, 54.8% were married-couple households, 14.9% were households with a male householder and no spouse or partner present, and 24.2% were households with a female householder and no spouse or partner present. About 21.7% of all households were made up of individuals, and 9.3% had someone living alone who was 65 or older.

The county had 84,340 housing units, of which 6.3% were vacant. Among occupied housing units, 73.9% were owner-occupied and 26.1% were renter-occupied. The homeowner vacancy rate was 1.6% and the rental vacancy rate was 6.1%.

=== 2000 census ===
At the 2000 census, 121,965 people, 46,595 households, and 33,688 families were residing in the county. The population density was 154 people per square mile (59 people/km^{2}). The 50,196 housing units had an average density of 63 units per square mile (24 units/km^{2}). The racial makeup of the county was 78.09% White, 15.65% African American, 0.41% Native American, 0.30% Asian, 0.04% Pacific Islander, 4.53% from other races, and 0.99% from two or more races. About 7.74% of the population were Hispanics or Latinos of any race.

Of the 46,595 households, 35.4% had children under 18 living with them, 57.8% were married couples living together, 10.6% had a female householder with no husband present, and 27.7% were not families. About 23.1% of all households were made up of individuals, and 8.6% had someone living alone who was 65 or older. The average household size was 2.58 and the average family size was 3.02.

In the county, the age distribution was 26.1% under 18, 8.1% from 18 to 24, 34.2% from 25 to 44, 21.7% from 45 to 64, and 9.8% who were 65 or older. The median age was 34 years. For every 100 females, there were 98.7 males. For every 100 females 18 and over, there were 96.3 males.

The median income in the county for a household was $40,872 and for a family was $48,599. Males had a median income of $33,008 versus $25,582 for females. The per capita income for the county was $18,788. About 8.9% of families and 12.8% of the population were below the poverty line, including 16.0% of those under 18 and 19.4% of those 65 or over.

== Law and government ==
The county is governed by the Johnston County Board of Commissioners, a seven-member board, elected to serve four-year terms. The commissioners enact policies such as establishment of the property tax rate, regulation of land use and zoning outside municipal jurisdictions, and adoption of the annual budget. Commissioners generally meet each month.

Current (2024) members of the Johnston County Board of Commissioners are:

- R.S. "Butch" Lawter, Jr., chairman
- Patrick E. Harris, vice chairman
- Richard D. Braswell
- Ted Godwin
- Fred J. Smith, Jr.
- April Stephens

Rick Hester is the county manager.

Johnston County is a member of the regional Triangle J Council of Governments.

In 2011, the Johnston County 911 Communications Center became one of four 911 agencies in the world to hold an Accredited Center of Excellence status from the National Academies of Emergency Dispatch in fire, police, and EMD protocols (giving them a Tri-ACE status). The dispatch has been reaccredited three times with the most recent being in 2017.

=== Politics ===
For most of the time after the Civil War, Johnston County was a classic Solid South county, going Democratic in all but three elections from 1880 to 1964. From 1968 onward, though, it has turned increasingly Republican, with the only breaks in this tradition being its support for third-party candidate George Wallace in 1968 and for Democrat Jimmy Carter in 1976. Carter's unsuccessful bid for reelection in 1980 is the last time that a Democrat has managed even 40% of the county's vote. Despite this, Kamala Harris's 38.59% of the vote was the highest for a Democrat in 44 years, indicating that the county may be moving Democratic.

In the 2020 North Carolina gubernatorial election, Republican Dan Forest won the county by a 17% margin over Democrat Roy Cooper, but in 2024, Republican Mark Robinson won the county by just 0.1%, consistent with the county's recent leftward shift.

United States presidential election results for Johnston County, North Carolina
Year	Republican		Democratic		Third party(ies)	
Year	No.	%	No.	%	No.	%
1880	1,631	44.20%	2,059	55.80%	0	0.00%
1884	1,831	39.50%	2,805	60.50%	0	0.00%
1888	2,129	41.52%	2,992	58.35%	7	0.14%
1892	1,036	21.62%	3,135	65.44%	620	12.94%
1896	1,824	35.29%	3,343	64.67%	2	0.04%
1900	1,997	38.64%	3,154	61.03%	17	0.33%
1904	1,553	37.65%	2,572	62.35%	0	0.00%
1908	2,827	52.16%	2,593	47.84%	0	0.00%
1912	1,335	25.80%	2,757	53.28%	1,083	20.93%
1916	2,857	45.17%	3,468	54.83%	0	0.00%
1920	5,588	48.10%	6,030	51.90%	0	0.00%
1924	4,910	51.20%	4,656	48.56%	23	0.24%
1928	7,696	60.42%	5,041	39.58%	0	0.00%
1932	3,887	28.77%	9,574	70.86%	50	0.37%
1936	4,339	27.83%	11,253	72.17%	0	0.00%
1940	4,192	29.59%	9,976	70.41%	0	0.00%
1944	4,423	34.81%	8,282	65.19%	0	0.00%
1948	3,211	24.71%	9,188	70.69%	598	4.60%
1952	5,429	35.19%	9,997	64.81%	0	0.00%
1956	4,893	33.18%	9,852	66.82%	0	0.00%
1960	6,660	40.18%	9,914	59.82%	0	0.00%
1964	7,523	42.15%	10,326	57.85%	0	0.00%
1968	6,764	33.05%	4,492	21.95%	9,212	45.01%
1972	14,272	79.24%	3,488	19.37%	251	1.39%
1976	8,511	45.08%	10,301	54.56%	67	0.35%
1980	10,444	51.26%	9,601	47.12%	331	1.62%
1984	16,210	67.32%	7,833	32.53%	37	0.15%
1988	15,563	63.97%	8,717	35.83%	49	0.20%
1992	15,418	48.67%	11,284	35.62%	4,977	15.71%
1996	18,704	58.23%	11,175	34.79%	2,240	6.97%
2000	27,212	66.12%	13,704	33.30%	239	0.58%
2004	36,903	67.89%	17,266	31.76%	188	0.35%
2008	43,622	61.42%	26,795	37.73%	600	0.84%
2012	48,427	63.15%	27,290	35.58%	974	1.27%
2016	54,372	63.29%	28,362	33.01%	3,175	3.70%
2020	68,353	61.38%	41,257	37.05%	1,747	1.57%
2024	74,878	60.06%	48,116	38.59%	1,684	1.35%

== Education ==
=== Higher education ===
Johnston County is home to Johnston Community College, a public, two-year, postsecondary college located in Smithfield. The college has off-campus centers throughout Johnston County.

=== Primary and secondary education ===
Public K-12 education in all of Johnston County is managed by the Johnston County School District, which has 46 schools and has more than 35,400 students. In addition, three charter schools and five private schools are located in the county.

=== Libraries ===
The Johnston County Public Affiliated Library system operates six branches throughout the county. The library system keeps books, periodicals, and audio books and has recently expanded the selection to include downloadable e-books. The Hocutt-Ellington Memorial Library in Clayton left the Johnston County affiliated library system in 2015.

== Culture ==
The Bentonville Battlefield State Historic Site is the largest Civil War battlefield in North Carolina. The Battle of Bentonville was fought in 1865 and was the only Confederate offensive targeted to stop General Sherman's march through the South.

The Tobacco Farm Life Museum in Kenly has been collecting artifacts and showcasing the heritage of the Eastern North Carolina farmer for over 35 years. The site includes a museum and restored farmstead, blacksmith shop, and one-room school house.

The Ava Gardner Museum, located in Smithfield, contains a collection of artifacts such as scripts, movie posters, costumes, and personal belongings of actress Ava Gardner, who was born and raised in Johnston County. The museum holds an annual festival.

The Johnston County Heritage Centers in Smithfield contains county artifacts and genealogical records.

The Johnston County Arts Council promotes arts in the county and its schools. Smithfield is the location of an annual Ava Gardner Festival, which celebrates the life of the actress.

The Meadow community is the location of Meadow Lights, an annual display of Christmas lights.

The Ham and Yam festival highlights two agricultural commodities for which Johnston County is a top producer - pork and sweet potatoes.

== Media ==
=== Radio and television ===
Johnston County is located in the Raleigh-Durham radio market, ranked by Nielsen as the 37th-largest in the United States. Johnston County's first radio station, WMPM, 1270 AM, in Smithfield, signed on in 1950. The county is also home to WPYB, 1130 AM in Benson, WHPY, 1590 AM in Clayton, WTSB, 1090 AM in Selma, and WKJO, 102.3 FM in Smithfield.

The county is also part of the larger, 23-county Raleigh-Durham-Fayetteville designated market area—the nation's 24th-largest. WNGT-CD, (virtual channel 34.1) a Class A low-powered TV station licensed to both Smithfield and Selma. The station began frequency sharing with Raleigh's WRAL-TV in November 2020, greatly expanding its coverage. Goldsboro-licensed CBS affiliate WNCN, virtual channel 17/RF channel 8, originally known as WYED-TV, signed on from studios and a transmitter in Clayton in 1988 before moving to Raleigh studios in 1995.

=== Newspapers ===
- Clayton News-Star
- Kenly News
- Four Oaks-Benson News in Review
- Princeton News Leader
- The Selma News
- Pine Level News
- Johnstonian News
- The Daily Record
- The Smithfield Herald
- The Cleveland Post
- The Garner-Cleveland Record
- The News and Observer

== Communities ==
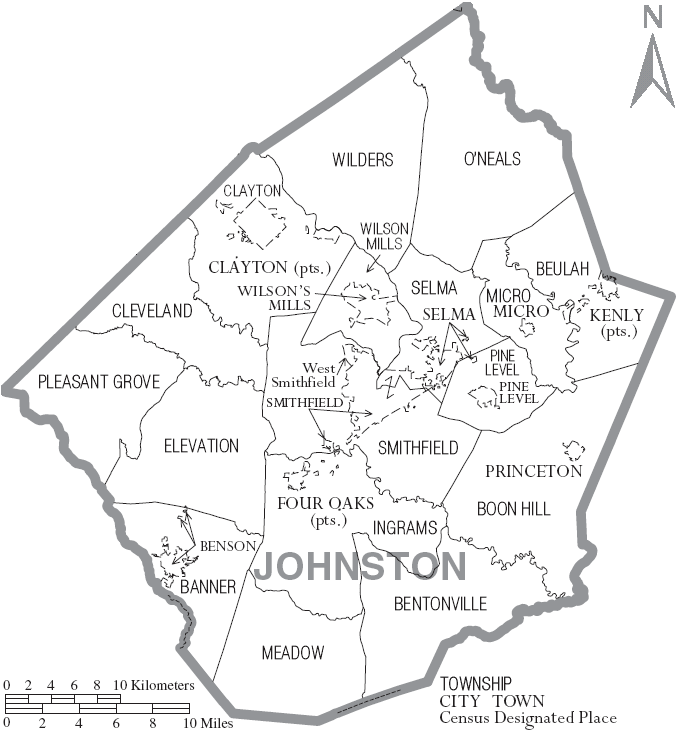
Map of Johnston County with municipal and township labels

=== Towns ===
- Archer Lodge
- Benson
- Clayton (largest community)
- Four Oaks
- Kenly
- Micro
- Pine Level
- Princeton
- Selma
- Smithfield (county seat)
- Wilson's Mills

=== Townships ===
- Banner
- Bentonville
- Beulah
- Boon Hill
- Brogden
- Clayton
- Cleveland
- Elevation
- Ingrams
- Meadow
- Micro
- O'Neals
- Pine Level
- Pleasant Grove
- Selma
- Smithfield
- Wilders
- Wilson Mills

=== Unincorporated communities ===
- Allens Crossroads
- Bagley
- Blackmans Crossroads
- Cleveland
- Emit
- Flowers
- Grabtown
- Hocutts Crossroads
- Jordan
- McGee's Crossroads
- Peacocks Crossroads
- Powhatan
- Spilona
- Stancils Chapel
- West Smithfield
- Willow Springs

== See also ==
- List of counties in North Carolina
- National Register of Historic Places listings in Johnston County, North Carolina
- List of places named after people in the United States
- North Carolina in the American Civil War
