= List of people with given name Ava =

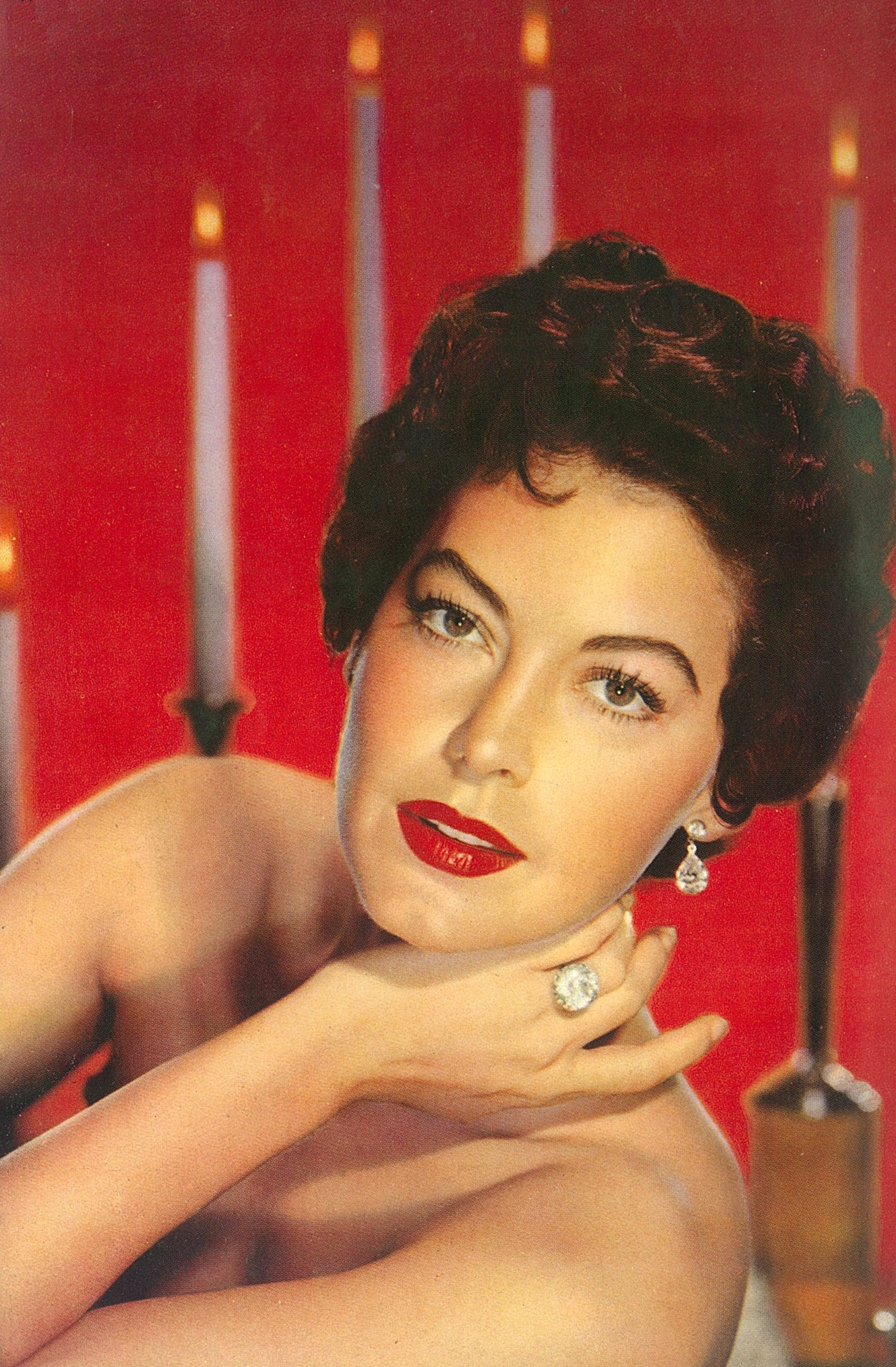
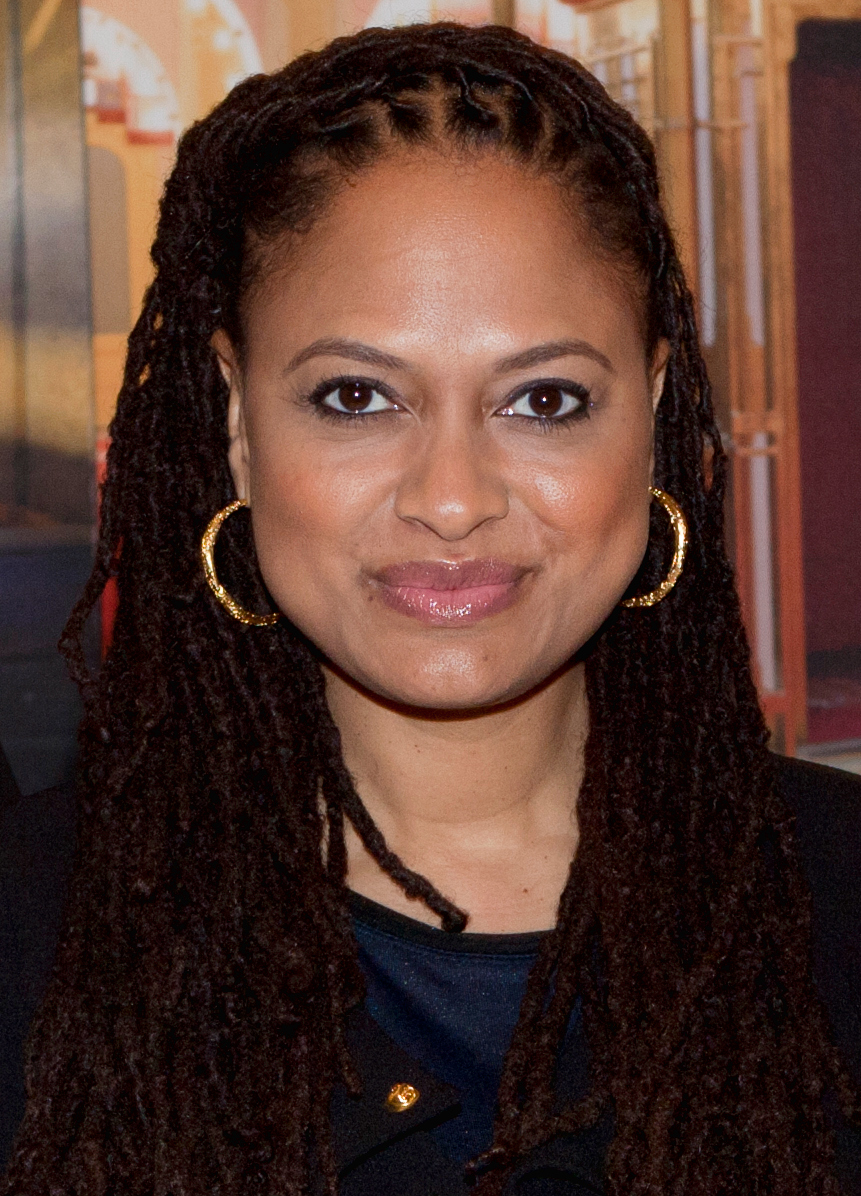
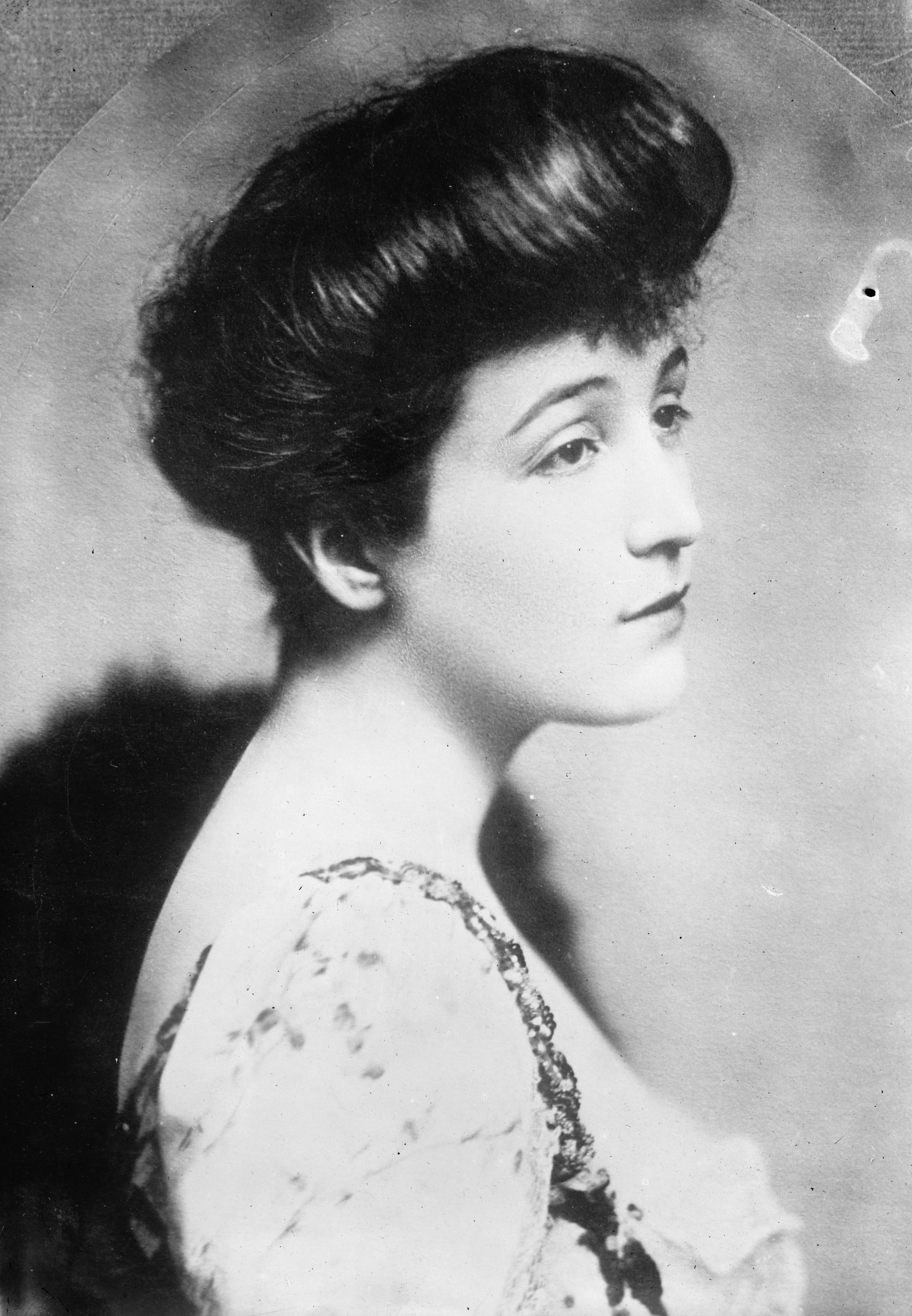
Notable people with the given name Ava include (left to right) actress Ava Gardner, filmmaker Ava DuVernay and socialite Ava Lowle Willing.

Ava is a feminine given name used in the English, German, and Russian languages. This is a list of notable people who bear the given name Ava, including people who use the name as a pseudonym or stage name, and fictional characters given the name.

The name originates from the 8th and 9th centuries during the Middle Ages as an abbreviation of Germanic names containing the first element aw‑, which is of uncertain meaning. The name gained popularity for babies during the 1950s. It then continued to gain popularity through Hollywood actress Ava Gardner. As of 2024, Ava is the ninth most popular female baby name in the United States and the tenth in Canada. Additionally in 2023, it was the sixth most popular female baby name across England, Wales and New South Wales, and the twentieth most popular in New Zealand in 2025.

== A–E ==
- Saint Ava, Roman Catholic saint
- Ava of Cerdanya (died 961), countess consort of Cerdanya and Besalú
- Ava of Ribagorza, Countess of Castile, countess consort of Castile
- Ava (c. 1060–1127), first named female writer in any genre in the German language
- Ava Acres, American actress
- Ava Alam (1947–1976), Bangladeshi classical singer and music teacher
- Ava Anderson, Viscountess Waverley (1895–1974), English political and social hostess
- Ava Alice Muriel Astor (1902–1956), American socialite
- Ava Baker, (born 2006) English footballer
- Ava Barber (born 1954), American country music singer
- Ava Berkofsky, American cinematographer
- Ava Boutilier (born 1999), Canadian ice hockey player
- Ava Brennan (born 1987), English film and theatre actress
- Ava Cadell (born 1956), Hungarian actor and writer
- Ava Canning (born 2004), Irish cricketer
- Ava Cantrell, American actress and dancer
- Ava Capri, American actress
- Ava Cherry (born 1953), American singer and model
- Ava Collins (born 2002), New Zealand association football player
- Ava Cook (born 1998), American soccer player
- Ava Crean, Irish long-distance runner
- Ava Wong Davies (born 1996), British playwright and screenwriter
- Ava de Lagercrantz (1862–1938), Swedish portrait painter
- Ava Della Pietra (born 2005), American singer and songwriter
- Ava Deluca-Verley (born 1989), American actress
- Ava Dobson (born 2008), American racing driver
- Ava DuVernay (born 1972), American filmmaker
- Ava Easton, health scientist and researcher
- Ava Everett (born 1995), American wrestler

== F–J ==
- Ava Fabian (born 1962), American model and actress
- Ava Flanell (born 1986), American influencer and politician
- Ava Gardner (1922–1990), American actress
- Ava Gerber (born 1961), American artist
- Ava Rossana Guevara, Honduran journalist and politician
- Ava Leavell Haymon, American writer
- Ava Heiden, American college basketball player
- Ava Holmgren (born 2005), Canadian cyclist
- Ava Homa, Iranian Kurdish writer and journalist
- Ava Hutchinson (born 1983), Irish long-distance runner
- Ava Jones (born 2005), American basketball player
- Ava Jones (archer), American archer
- Ava June (1931–2013), English singer and opera singer

== K–O ==
- Ava Kemp (born 2003), Canadian pair skater
- Ava Knight (born 1988), American boxer and mixed martial arts fighter
- Ava Kolker (born 2006), American actress and singer
- Ava Kuyken (born 2001), English footballer
- Ava Lazar, American actress
- Ava Lee (born 2005), English cricketer
- Ava Lloyd (born 2005), British middle-distance runner
- Ava Lowery (born 1995), American activist and filmmaker
- Ava Markham (born 1995), American tennis player
- Ava Matthey (born 1991), real name of Moon, Swiss Romani drag performer
- Ava McNaughton (born 2004), American ice hockey player
- Ava Mendoza (born 1983), American avant-garde guitarist, vocalist, and composer
- Ava Michelle (born 2002), American actress
- Ava Milam Clark (1884–1976), American home economist
- Ava Mukherjee (c. 1929–2018), Indian film and television actress
- Ava Muhammad (1951–2022), American Islamic minister
- Ava O'Connor (born 2003), Irish track and field athlete
- Ava Ohlgren (born 1988), American swimmer

== P–T ==
- Ava Helen Pauling (1903–1981), American human rights activist
- Ava Pickett (born 1993 or 1994), British screenwriter and playwright
- Ava Preacher (1953–2021), American gender studies professor
- Ava Reid (born 1993), American author
- Ava Rinker (born 2002), American ice hockey player
- Ava Rocha (born 1979), Brazilian singer and songwriter
- Ava Roth, Canadian contemperary artist
- Ava Maria Safai, Iranian-Canadian director
- Ava Seelenfreund (born 2001), American soccer player
- Ava Seumanufagai (born 1991), New Zealand rugby league footballer (male)
- Ava Seymour (born 1967), New Zealand artist
- Ava Shamban, American celebrity dermatologist
- Ava Smith (born 1988), American fashion model
- Ava Stewart (born 2005), Canadian artistic gymnast
- Ava Tankersley (born 2002), American soccer player

== U–Z ==
- Ava Usher (born 2007), Australian rules footballer
- Ava Verdeflor (born 1999), Filipino-American artistic gymnast
- Ava Vidal (born 1976), English comedian
- Ava Carroll Waller (1927–2014), American preservationist, writer and First Lady of Mississippi
- Ava Webster (born 2009 or 2010), British actress
- Ava Lowle Willing (1868–1958), American socialite
- Ava Yaman (born 2006), Turkish actress
- Ava Yu (born 1985), Hong Kong singer, actress and television host
- Ava Marie Ziegler (born 2006), American figure skater

== Pseudonyms ==
- AVA, English singer
- AVA, pseudonym of Éabha McMahon (born 1990), Irish singer
- Ava (born 2001), American wrestler
- Ava (born 1996), Italian record producer, DJ, and beatmaker
- Ava, stage name of Lee Jung-hyun (born 1980), South Korean singer and actress
- Ava Cordero, (born c. 1983), American model
- Ava Leigh (born 1985), English singer
- Ava Lily (born 1993), English singer-songwriter
- Ava Lovelace, pen name of Delilah S. Dawson (born 1977), American author
- Ava Max (born 1994), American singer and songwriter
- Ava Storie, former stage name of Brandi Lauren (born 1996), American model and wrestler

== Fictional characters ==
- Ava Ayala, given name of White Tiger, Marvel Comics
- Ava Hartman, in EastEnders
- Ava Jerome, in General Hospital
- Ava Lord, in Sin City
- Ava Vitali, in Days of Our Lives

== See also ==
- List of people with given name Eva
