= Ogburn =

Ogburn is a surname. Notable people with the surname include:

- Charlton Ogburn (1911–1998), American journalist and author
- Charlton Greenwood Ogburn (1882–1962), American lawyer
- John Ogburn (1925–2010), Australian painter
- Lu Long Ogburn (1932–2025), American beauty queen
- Michael Ogburn (born 1948), British footballer
- Nan Ogburn (1929–2015), American singer and philanthropist
- William Fielding Ogburn (1886–1959), American sociologist
