= Hood Brothers Building =

Historic building in North Carolina, US

- U.S. National Register of Historic Places
- U.S. Historic district – Contributing property
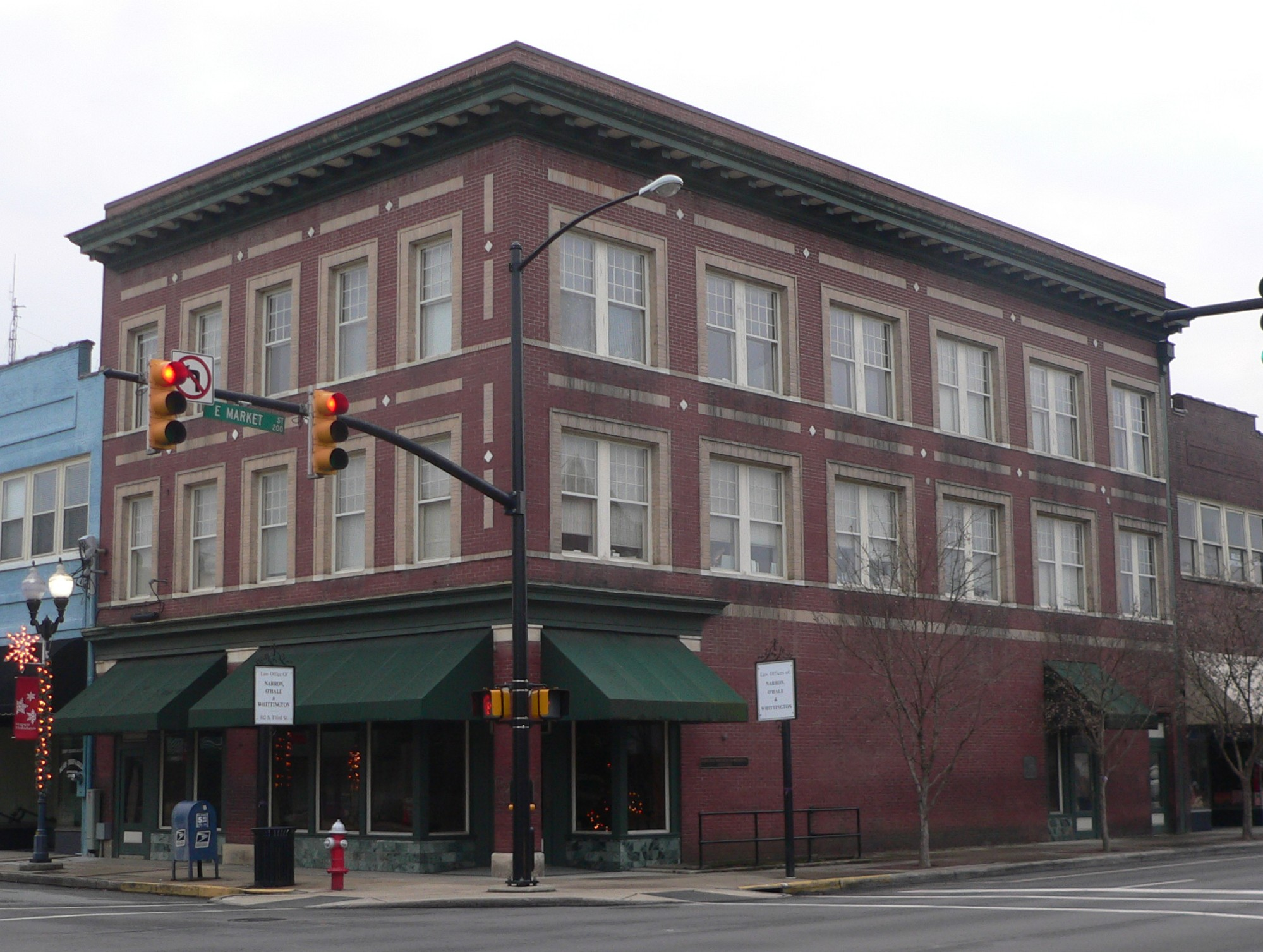
- Hood Brothers Building, December 2014

- Location within North Carolina Location within the United States
- Location: 100-104 S. Third St., Smithfield, North Carolina
- Coordinates: 35°30′40″N 78°20′48″W
- Area: less than one acre
- Built: 1923
- Built by: Rose, D.J.
- Architectural style: Classical Revival
- NRHP reference No.: 86001623
- Added to NRHP: August 14, 1986

Hood Brothers Building, also known as Hood's Corner, is a historic commercial building located at Smithfield, Johnston County, North Carolina. It was built in 1923, and is a two-story, five bay by six bay, rectangular steel frame building with a brick veneer in the Classical Revival style. The building incorporates two storefronts; the second and third floors were occupied by offices. The storefronts were for many years occupied by a drug store and barber shop.

It was listed on the National Register of Historic Places in 1986. It is located in the Downtown Smithfield Historic District.
