= Miss America 1952 =

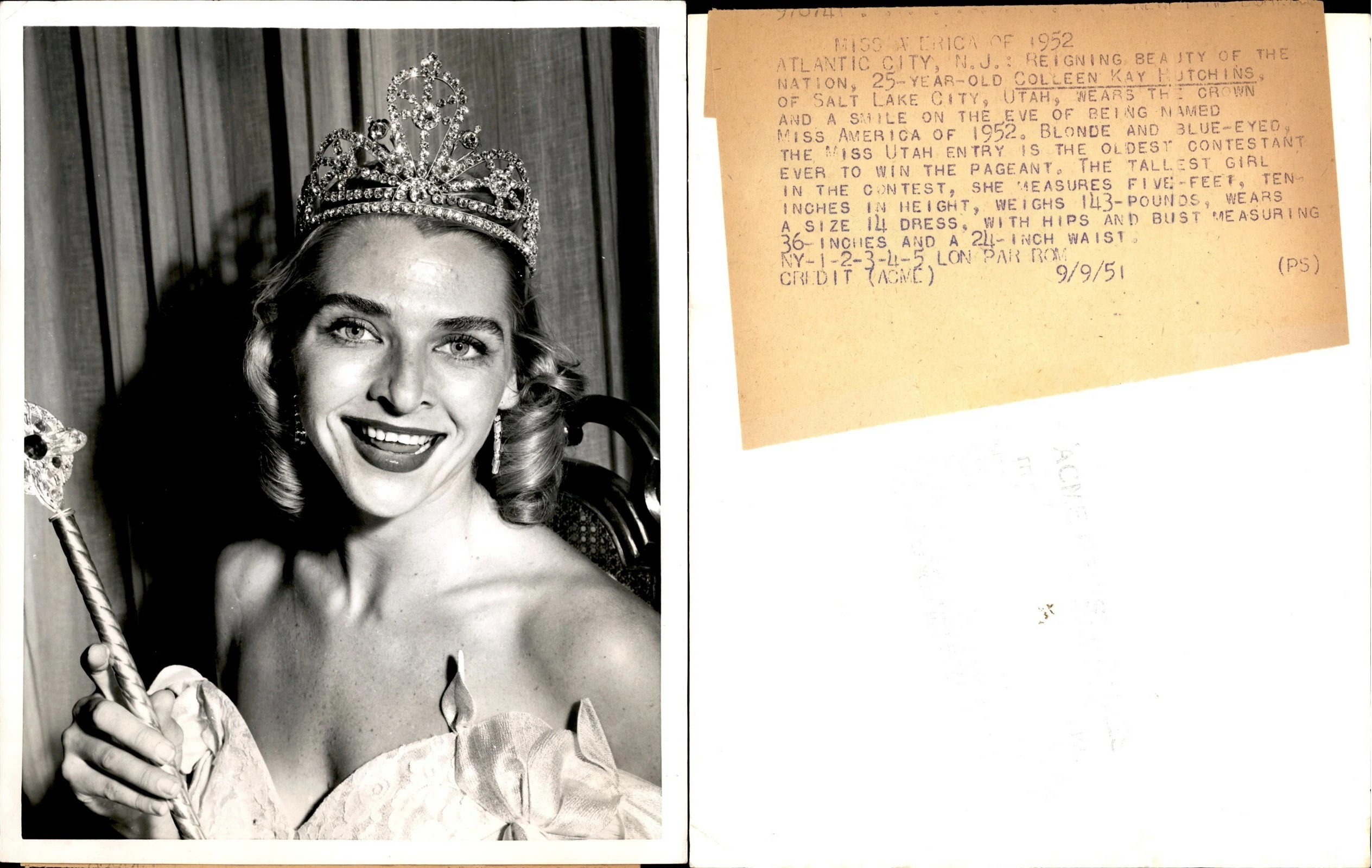
- Date: September 8, 1951
- Venue: Boardwalk Hall, Atlantic City, New Jersey
- Entrants: 51
- Placements: 15
- Winner: Colleen Kay Hutchins; Utah

Miss America 1952, the 25th Miss America pageant, was held at the Boardwalk Hall in Atlantic City, New Jersey on September 8, 1951. At age 25 (the maximum age that an entrant may be), Colleen Kay Hutchins is the second-oldest contestant to capture the crown (Debra Sue Maffett, Miss America 1983, is the oldest by a few months).

== Results ==
=== Placements ===
Placement	Contestant
Miss America 1952	Utah – Colleen Kay Hutchins
1st Runner-Up	Indiana – Carol Mitchell
2nd Runner-Up	North Carolina – Lu Long Ogburn
3rd Runner-Up	Arkansas – Charlotte Simmen
4th Runner-Up	Florida – Mary Elizabeth Godwin
Top 10	Chicago – Adrianne Falcon; Maryland – Georgia Reed; Oklahoma – Bobbie Jene Simmons; South Carolina – Joyce Earle Perry; South Dakota – Marlene Margaret Rieb
Top 15	Alabama – Jeanne Moody; Mississippi – Jessie Wynn Morgan; New Hampshire – Colleen Phyllis Gallant; Tennessee – Jean Harper; West Virginia – Phyllis Lee Walker

=== Awards ===
==== Preliminary awards ====
Awards	Contestant
Lifestyle and Fitness	Arkansas - Charlotte Simmen; North Carolina - Lu Long Ogburn; South Dakota - Marlene Margaret Rieb
Talent	Alabama - Jeanne Moody; North Carolina - Lu Long Ogburn; Utah - Colleen Kay Hutchins

=== Other awards ===
Awards	Contestant
Miss Congeniality	Hawaii - Claire Katherine Heen (tie); Puerto Rico - Otilia Jimenez (tie)

== Contestants ==
Title	Name	Hometown	Age	Talent	Placement	Awards	Notes	Ref.
Alabama	Jeanne Moody	Cherokee	21	Dramatic Skit, "Sorry, Wrong Number"	Top 10	Preliminary Talent Award		
Arkansas	Charlotte Simmen	Little Rock	18	Vocal & Art Exhibition	3rd Runner-up	Preliminary Lifestyle and Fitness Award		
California	Patricia Lehman	Sacramento	25	Piano				
Canada	Marjorie Alma Kelly	Courtland	23					
Chicago	Adrianne Falcon	Chicago	19	Vocal & Dance	Top 10			
Colorado	Jo London	Aurora	20	Dramatic Monologue				
Connecticut	Beverly Buriant	Bridgeport	19	Drama			Later Miss Connecticut USA 1953	
Delaware	Suzanne Parrott	Dover	18	Piano				
(Washington, D.C.) District of Columbia	June Klein		20	Vocal				
Florida	Mary Elizabeth Godwin	Gainesville	19	Pantomime, "Betty Boop"	4th Runner-up			
(Georgia (U.S. state)) Georgia	Carol Frances Taylor	Alma	20	Monologue				
Greater Philadelphia	Margaret Mary Ramsdale	Philadelphia	19	Vocal, "Danny Boy"				
Hawaii	Claire Katherine Heen	Honolulu	18	Hula		Miss Congeniality		
Idaho	Phyllis Ralstin	Nezperce	19	Operatic Vocal, "My Hero" from The Chocolate Soldier				
Illinois	Doris King	Granite City	18	Dance				
Indiana	Carol Mitchell	Rochester		Chalk Talk & Marionette Exhibition	1st Runner-up			
Iowa	Nancy Jane Norman	Shenandoah	19	Vocal, "Romance" from The Desert Song				
Kentucky	Dottye Nuckols	Bowling Green	19	Vocal				
Louisiana	Jeanne Thompson	Baton Rouge	19	Dance			Later Miss Louisiana USA 1952 & 1953, the only woman ever to compete at Miss USA twice	
Maine	Beverly Ann Emery	Auburn	19	Classical Vocal from The Student Prince				
Maryland	Georgia Reed	Baltimore	20	Vocal, "Love is Where You Find it" from The Kissing Bandit	Top 10			
Massachusetts	Mildred Almeida	New Bedford	22	Fashion Modeling				
Michigan	Delores Maria Berruezo	St. Clair Shores	19	Dance			First Latina Miss Michigan	
Minnesota	Katherine Rose Clark	Minneapolis	20	Classical Vocal, "The Jewel Song" from Faust			Kathryn Rose Clark, a native of La Crosse, Wis., was a student the MacPhail School of Music in Minneapolis, Minn. for three years at the time of her state victory.	
Mississippi	Jessie Morgan	Newton	18	Ballet	Top 15			
Missouri	Carol Romann	St. Charles	19	Bassoon				
Montana	Patricia McGinty	Great Falls	20	Classical Vocal, "Mon cœur s'ouvre à ta voix" from Samson and Delilah				
Nebraska	Geraldine Elseman	Omaha	19	Dramatic Monologue				
Nevada	Donna Jo Ann Sollars	Reno	21	Vocal & Ukulele, "Has Anybody Seen My Gal?" & "Can't Help Lovin' Dat Man"				
New Hampshire	Coleen Gallant	Laconia		Water Skiing	Top 15			
New Jersey	Bernice Massi	Camden	18					
(New York (state)) New York	Louise Orlando	Syracuse	19	Vocal				
New York City	Sandu Scott	New York City	21	Vocal				
North Carolina	Lu Ogborn	Smithfield	19	Piano, "Malagueña"	2nd Runner-up	Preliminary Talent Award; Preliminary Lifestyle and Fitness Award		
North Dakota	Marilyn Walker	Minot	19	Painting Display				
Ohio	Diane Howell	Apple Creek	22	Drama				
Oklahoma	Bobby Jene Simmons	Oklahoma City	18	Classical Vocal, "Je Veux Vivre" from Roméo et Juliette	Top 10			
Oregon	Audrey Ann Mistretta	Astoria	18	Vocal				
Pennsylvania	Clare Lippert	Tarentum		Vocal, "Lullaby of Broadway"				
Puerto Rico	Otilia Jimenez Mendez	Arecibo	17			Miss Congeniality		
South Carolina	Joyce Perry	Conway	18	Comedy Vocal, "Sewing Machine"	Top 10			
South Dakota	Marlene Rieb	Parkston	18	Baton Twirling	Top 10	Preliminary Lifestyle and Fitness Award		
Tennessee	Jean Harper	Memphis	19	Vocal, "Smoke Gets in Your Eyes"	Top 15		Later Miss Tennessee USA 1952 and 1st Runner-up at Miss USA 1952	
Texas	Glenda Holcomb	Odessa	18	Dramatic Monologue				
Utah	Colleen Kay Hutchins	Salt Lake City	25	Dramatic Monologue, "Elizabeth the Queen" by Maxwell Anderson	Winner	Preliminary Talent Award		
Vermont	Peggy Gilbert	Rutland	19	Dance				
Virginia	Shirley Bryant	Norfolk		Vocal				
(Washington (state)) Washington	Darlene Shaffer	Seattle	19	Dress Design				
West Virginia	Phyllis Walker	Charleston	18	Drama	Top 15			
Wisconsin	Sheila Murphy	Marshfield	18	Monologue				
Wyoming	Patricia Seabeck	Casper	20	Monologue				
