= Dolester Miles =

- Born: 1957 (age 68–69); Victoria, Texas, United States
- Occupation: Pastry chef
- Years active: 1982–present

Dolester "Dol" Miles (born 1957) is an American pastry chef and a three-time James Beard Award finalist. Miles serves as the pastry chef at Frank Stitt's Highlands Bar and Grill in Birmingham, Alabama. Miles was named Outstanding Pastry Chef by the James Beard Foundation in May 2018.

== Early life ==
Miles was born in Victoria, Texas in 1957 and grew up in Bessemer, Alabama. She learned to make traditional Southern desserts like pecan pie, lemon meringue pie and peach cobbler from her mother Cora Mae. Miles graduated from Wenonah High School in 1975 and attended Alabama A&M University and Lawson State Community College where she studied computer science. To help pay her way through college, she began working as a cook in Homewood, Alabama.

== Career ==
In 1982, Frank Stitt opened Highlands Bar and Grill in Birmingham. He hired Miles and her older sister Diane as cooks. Miles gradually worked her way up to executive pastry chef at the restaurant. She later moved on to making desserts for all of Stitt's restaurants, including Bottega, Bottega Cafe, and Chez Fonfon.

In 2016, Miles was named a James Beard Award finalist for outstanding pastry chef. She also advanced to the finals in 2017 and 2018. She was named Outstanding Pastry Chef by the James Beard Foundation in May 2018.

In 2018, Miles was the subject of "Dol", a documentary film by Ava Lowery.

Her recipes have appeared in multiple publications, including Southern Living and a series of cookbooks written by Stitt. As a pastry chef, she is best known for her strawberry shortcake, lemon meringue tart and coconut pecan cake.
