= Downtown Smithfield Historic District =

Historic district in North Carolina, United States

- U.S. National Register of Historic Places
- U.S. Historic district
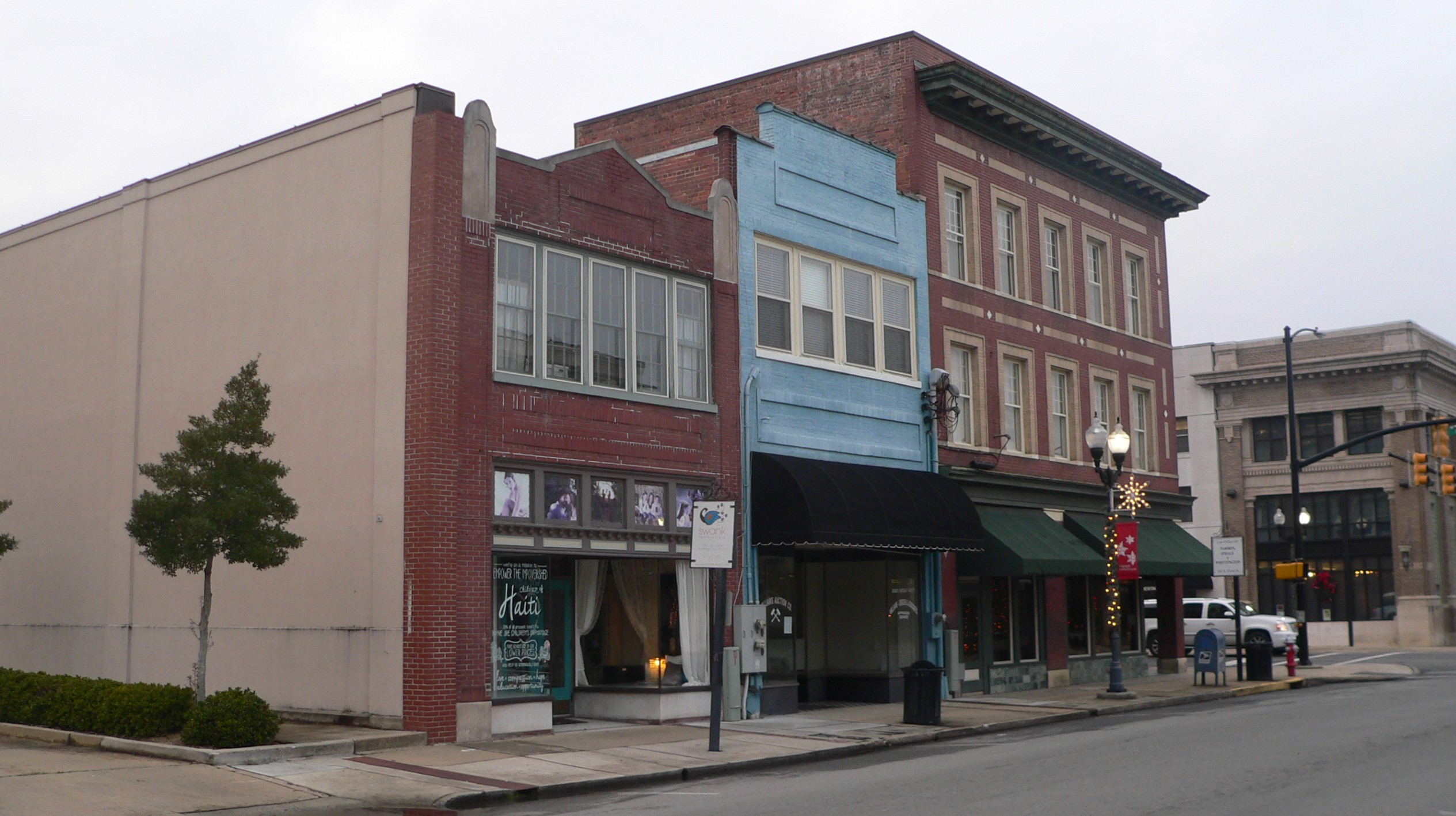
- Downtown Smithfield Historic District

- Location within North Carolina Location within the United States
- Location: S. Third and Market Sts., Smithfield, North Carolina
- Coordinates: 35°30′39″N 78°20′46″W
- Area: less than one acre
- Built: c. 1896
- Built by: Rose, D.J.; Hildebrand, Miles
- Architectural style: Art Deco, classical revival, 20th-century commercial
- NRHP reference No.: 93001120
- Added to NRHP: October 14, 1993

Downtown Smithfield Historic District is a national historic district located at Smithfield, Johnston County, North Carolina. It encompasses 24 contributing buildings in the central business district of Smithfield. It includes notable examples of Classical Revival and Art Deco style architecture and buildings dating from about the 1890s through the 1930s. Located in the district is the separately listed Hood Brothers Building. Other notable buildings include the Austin Building (1921), First Citizens Bank (1913), Carolina Telephone Building (1913), Municipal Building (1937), and the Howell Theater (1935).

It was listed on the National Register of Historic Places in 1993.
