= Ava Gardner =

American actress (1922–1990)

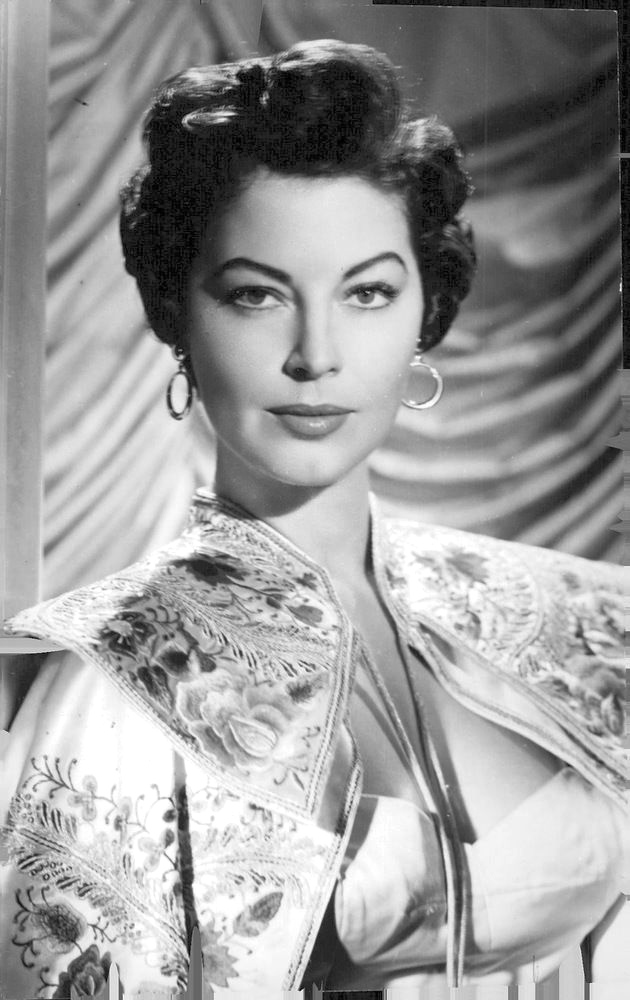
- Gardner in 1954
- Born: Ava Lavinia Gardner; December 24, 1922; Grabtown, North Carolina, U.S.
- Died: January 25, 1990 (aged 67); Westminster, London, England
- Burial place: Sunset Memorial Park; Smithfield, North Carolina, U.S.
- Occupation: Actress
- Years active: 1941–1986
- Political party: Democratic
- Spouses: Mickey Rooney (m. 1942; div. 1943); Artie Shaw (m. 1945; div. 1946); Frank Sinatra (m. 1951; div. 1957)
- Website: avagardner.org

Ava Lavinia Gardner (December 24, 1922 – January 25, 1990) was an American actress during the Golden Age of Hollywood. She first signed a contract with Metro-Goldwyn-Mayer in 1941 and appeared mainly in small roles until she drew critics' attention in 1946 with her performance in Robert Siodmak's film noir The Killers.

During the 1950s, Gardner established herself as a leading lady and one of the era's top stars with films like Show Boat and Pandora and the Flying Dutchman both in 1951. Gardner went on to star in a series of action adventures throughout the 1950s, including The Snows of Kilimanjaro (1952), Mogambo (1953), and The Barefoot Contessa (1954). At the end of the decade she starred opposite Gregory Peck and Fred Astaire in On the Beach (1959).

Gardner continued her film career for three more decades, appearing in the films 55 Days at Peking (1963), Seven Days in May (1964), The Bible: In the Beginning... (1966), and Mayerling (1968). She continued to act regularly until 1986, four years before her death in 1990, at the age of 67. Mogambo earned her a nomination for an Academy Award for Best Actress.

Gardner also received nominations for a Golden Globe Award, and a BAFTA Award for Best Actress, for her performance in The Night of the Iguana. Gardner remained lifelong friends with Peck and was active in progressive politics. She died in 1990 after suffering a stroke in 1986. In 1999, the American Film Institute ranked Gardner No. 25 on its greatest female screen legends list.

== Early life ==
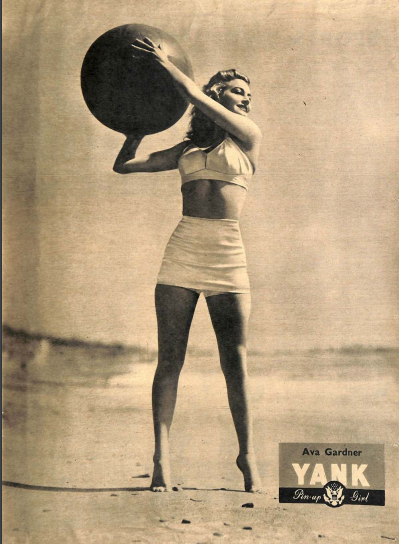
Gardner in 1943

Ava Lavinia Gardner was born on December 24, 1922, in Grabtown, North Carolina, the youngest of seven children. When Gardner was born, by community standards, they were "better than well-to-do" with her father having the deed to their tobacco and cotton farm, and owning a sawmill and a country store. She was of English and Scots Irish ancestry.

She was raised in her mother's Baptist faith. During the Depression, while Gardner was still young, the family lost their property. Gardner's mother received an offer to work as a cook and housekeeper at a dormitory for teachers at the nearby Brogden School that included board for the family. Gardner's father sharecropped tobacco and supplemented the dwindling work with odd jobs at sawmills. In 1931, the teachers' school closed, forcing the family to finally give up on their property dreams and move to Newport News, Virginia, where Gardner's mother found work managing a boarding house for the city's many shipworkers.

While in Newport News, Gardner's father became ill and died from bronchitis in 1938. Gardner was 15 years old. After her father's death, the family moved to Rock Ridge near Wilson, North Carolina. Gardner's mother ran another boarding house for teachers and Gardner attended high school in Rock Ridge. She graduated in 1939. The family was not well off and she had to wear hand-me-down clothes to school, to the derision of her classmates. She then attended secretarial classes at Atlantic Christian College in Wilson for about a year. Both Gardner and a close friend of hers, Alberta Cooney, recalled that she had a preference for being barefoot.

== Career ==
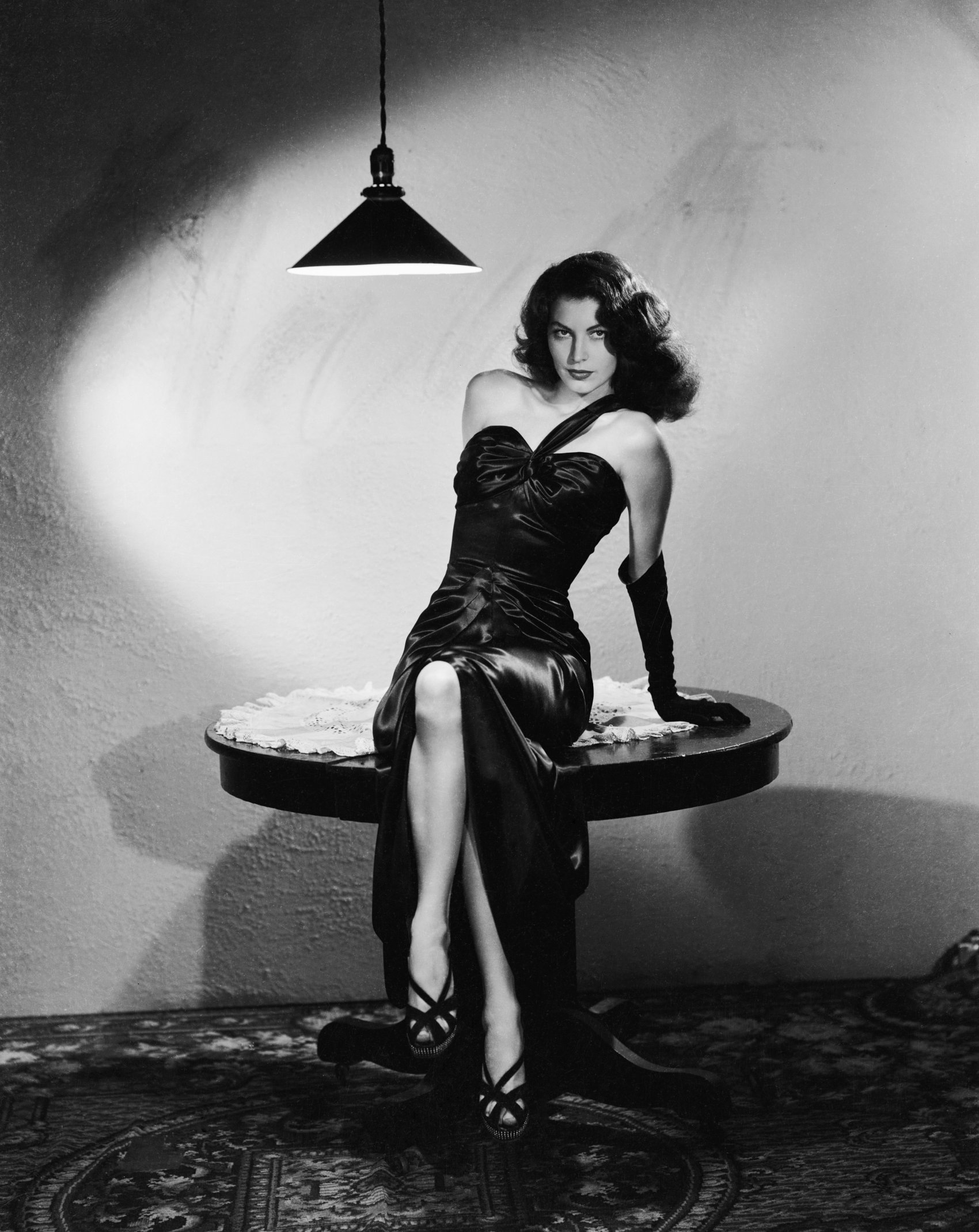
Gardner in a publicity photo for The Killers (1946)

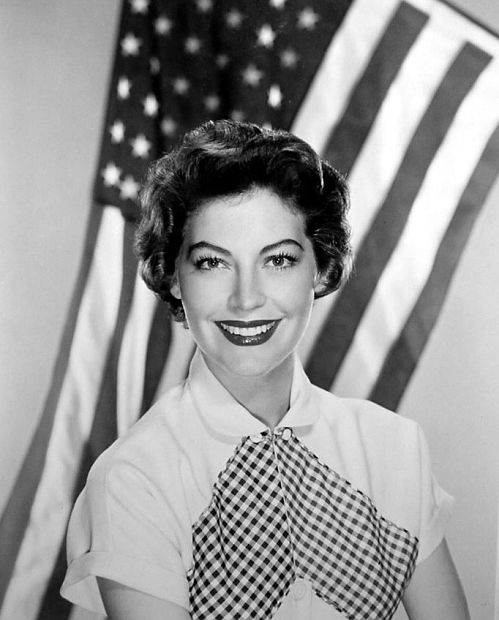
Gardner in a 1950s publicity photo

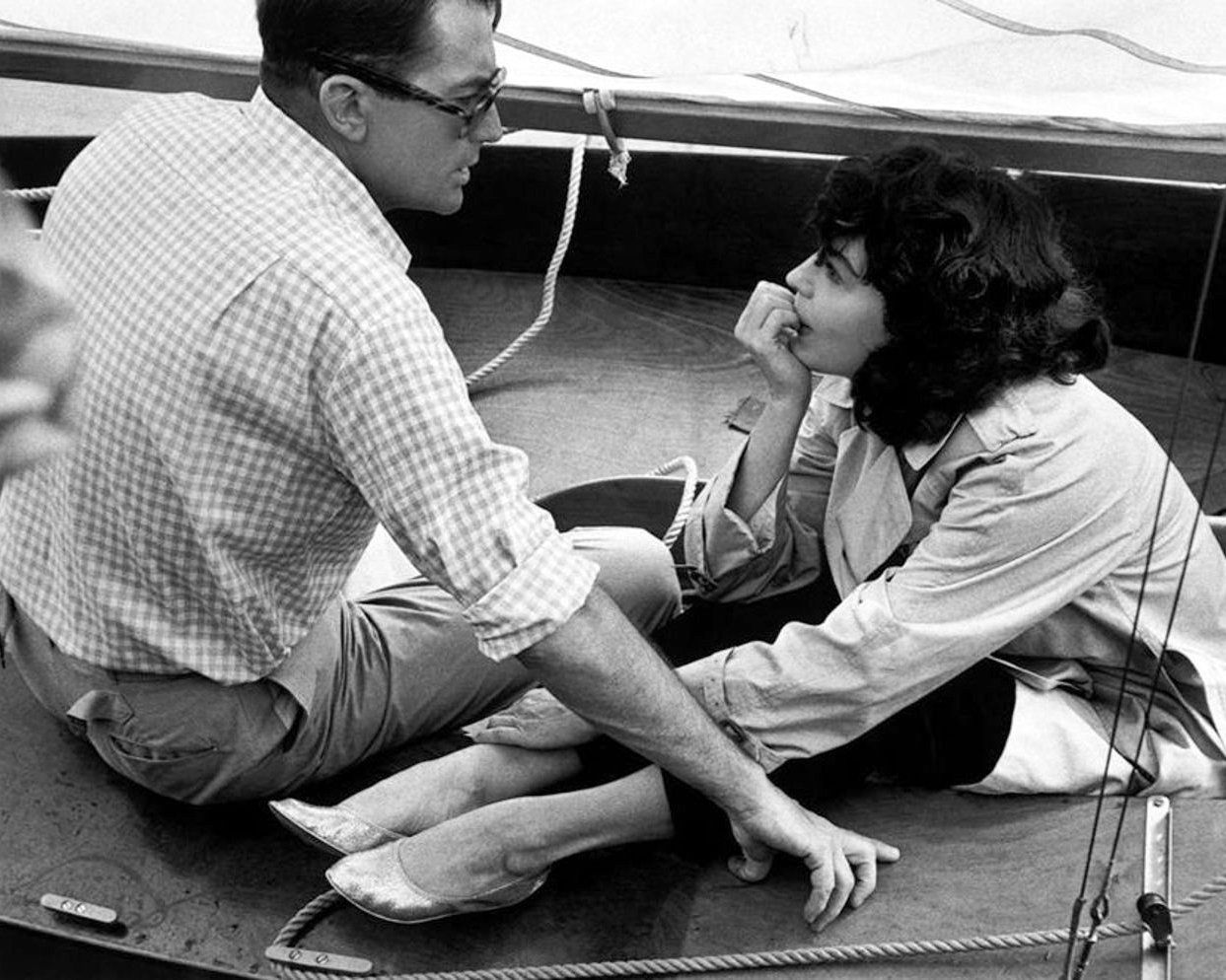
Gregory Peck and Ava Gardner publicity photo for the film On the Beach, 1959

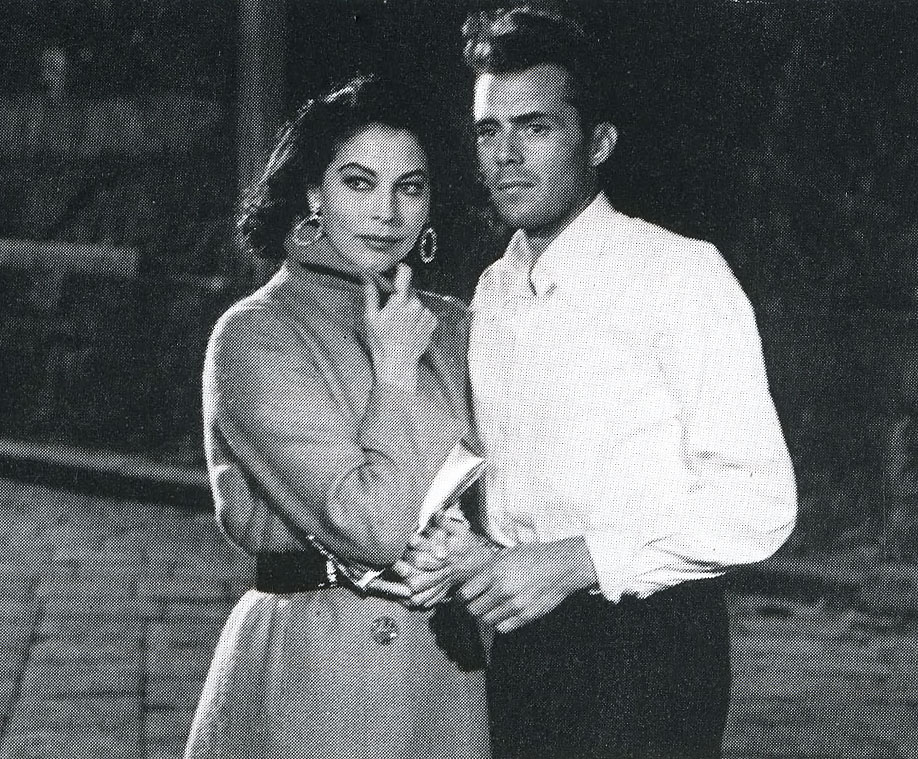
Gardner with Dirk Bogarde in The Angel Wore Red (1960)

Gardner was visiting her sister in New York City in the summer of 1940 when her brother-in-law, a professional photographer, offered to take her portrait as a gift for her mother. He was so pleased with the results that he displayed the finished product in the front window of his photography studio on Fifth Avenue.

Barnard Duhan, a legal clerk at Loews Theatres, spotted Gardner's portrait in her brother-in-law's studio. At the time, Duhan often posed as a Metro-Goldwyn-Mayer (MGM) talent scout to meet girls, using the fact that MGM was a subsidiary of Loews. Duhan entered Gardner's brother-in-law's studio and tried to get her number, but he was rebuffed by the receptionist. Duhan made the comment: "somebody should send her info to MGM." Her brother-in-law did so shortly after Gardner, who at the time was a student at Atlantic Christian College, traveled to New York.

She was interviewed at MGM's New York office by Al Altman, head of MGM's New York talent department. With cameras rolling, he directed the 18-year-old to walk toward the camera, turn and walk away, then rearrange some flowers in a vase. He did not attempt to record her voice because her strong Southern accent made understanding her difficult for him. Louis B. Mayer, head of MGM, however, purportedly sent a telegram to Altman: "She can't sing. She can't act. She can't talk. She's terrific!" She was offered a standard contract by the studio and left school for Hollywood in 1941, with her sister accompanying her. MGM's first order of business was to provide her with a speech coach because her Carolina drawl was nearly incomprehensible to them, and Harriet Lee as her singing teacher.

Her first appearance in a feature film was as a walk-on in the Norma Shearer vehicle We Were Dancing (1942). Fifteen bit parts later, she received her first screen billing in Ghosts on the Loose (1943), and she is featured by name on the theatrical poster. After five years of bit parts, mostly at MGM and many of them uncredited, Gardner came to prominence in the Mark Hellinger production The Killers (1946), playing the femme fatale Kitty Collins. Although she had good reviews, she had a fragile self-image. "Ava wouldn't even go eat in the commissary because she was so scared to walk in and see Lana Turner and Greer Garson," says actress Arlene Dahl. The next twelve years began with The Hucksters (1947) and culminated with On the Beach, the Oscar nomination for Mogambo being the high point. Other films included One Touch of Venus (1948), Show Boat (1951), The Snows of Kilimanjaro (1952), and The Sun Also Rises. Off-camera Gardner was witty and pithy, as in her assessment of director John Ford, who directed Mogambo ("The meanest man on earth. Thoroughly evil. Adored him!").

=== Roles ===
In The Barefoot Contessa, she played the role of doomed beauty Maria Vargas, a fiercely independent woman who goes from Spanish dancer to international movie star with the help of a Hollywood director played by Humphrey Bogart, with tragic consequences. Gardner's decision to accept the role was influenced by her own lifelong habit of going barefoot. Gardner played the role of Guinevere in Knights of the Round Table (1953), with actor Robert Taylor as Sir Lancelot. Indicative of her sophistication, she portrayed a duchess, a baroness, and other women of noble lineage in her films of the 1950s.

Gardner played the role of Soledad in The Angel Wore Red (1960) with Dirk Bogarde as the male lead. She was billed between Charlton Heston and David Niven for 55 Days at Peking (1963), which was set in China during the Boxer Rebellion in 1900. The following year, she played her last major leading role in the critically acclaimed The Night of the Iguana (1964), based upon a Tennessee Williams play, and starring Richard Burton as an atheist clergyman and Deborah Kerr as a gentle artist traveling with her aged poet grandfather. John Huston directed the movie in Puerto Vallarta, Mexico, insisting on making the film in black-and-white – a decision he later regretted because of the vivid colors of the flora. Gardner received billing below Burton, but above Kerr. She was nominated for a Golden Globe Award for Best Actress in a Motion Picture – Drama and BAFTA Award for Best Actress in a Leading Role for her performance.

She next appeared again with Burt Lancaster, her co-star from The Killers, this time with Kirk Douglas and Fredric March, in Seven Days in May (1964), a thriller about an attempted military takeover of the US government. Gardner played a former love interest of Lancaster's who could be instrumental in preventing a coup against the President of the United States.

John Huston chose Gardner for the part of Sarah, the wife of Abraham (played by George C. Scott), in the Dino De Laurentiis film The Bible: In the Beginning..., which was released in 1966. In a 1964 interview, she talked about why she accepted the role:

He [Huston] had more faith in me than I did myself. Now I'm glad I listened, for it is a challenging role and a very demanding one. I start out as a young wife, and age through various periods, forcing me to adjust psychologically to each age. It is a complete departure for me, and most intriguing. In this role, I must create a character, not just play one.

Two years later, in 1966, Gardner briefly sought the role of Mrs. Robinson in Mike Nichols' The Graduate (1967). She reportedly called Nichols and said "I want to see you! I want to talk about this Graduate thing!" Nichols never seriously considered her for the part, preferring to cast a younger woman (Anne Bancroft was 35, while Gardner was 44), but he did visit her hotel, where he later said "she sat at a little French desk with a telephone, she went through every movie star cliché. She said, 'All right, let's talk about your movie. First of all, I strip for nobody.'" Gardner moved to London in 1966, undergoing an elective hysterectomy to allay her worries of contracting the uterine cancer that had claimed the life of her mother. Two years later, she appeared in Mayerling, in which she played the supporting role of Austrian Empress Elisabeth of Austria, with James Mason as Emperor Franz Joseph I.

Her last appearance was in 1986 in the television film Maggie. Gardner authored a book about her life titled Ava: My Story published by Random House Publishing Group in 1990.

== Personal life ==
=== Marriages ===
Ava Gardner was married three times, her first marriage being at age 19. Soon after Gardner arrived in Los Angeles, she met fellow MGM contract player Mickey Rooney; they married on January 10, 1942. The ceremony was held in the remote town of Ballard, California, because MGM studio head Louis B. Mayer was worried that fans would desert Rooney's Andy Hardy movie series if it became known that their star was married. Gardner divorced Rooney in 1943, citing mental cruelty, privately blaming his gambling and womanizing. She did not ruin his on-screen image as the clean-cut, judge's son Andy Hardy that the public adored.

Gardner's second marriage was equally brief, to jazz musician and bandleader Artie Shaw, from 1945 to 1946. Shaw previously had been married to Lana Turner. Gardner's third was to singer and actor Frank Sinatra from 1951 to 1957. She later said in her autobiography that he was the love of her life. Sinatra left his wife Nancy for Gardner, and their marriage made headlines.

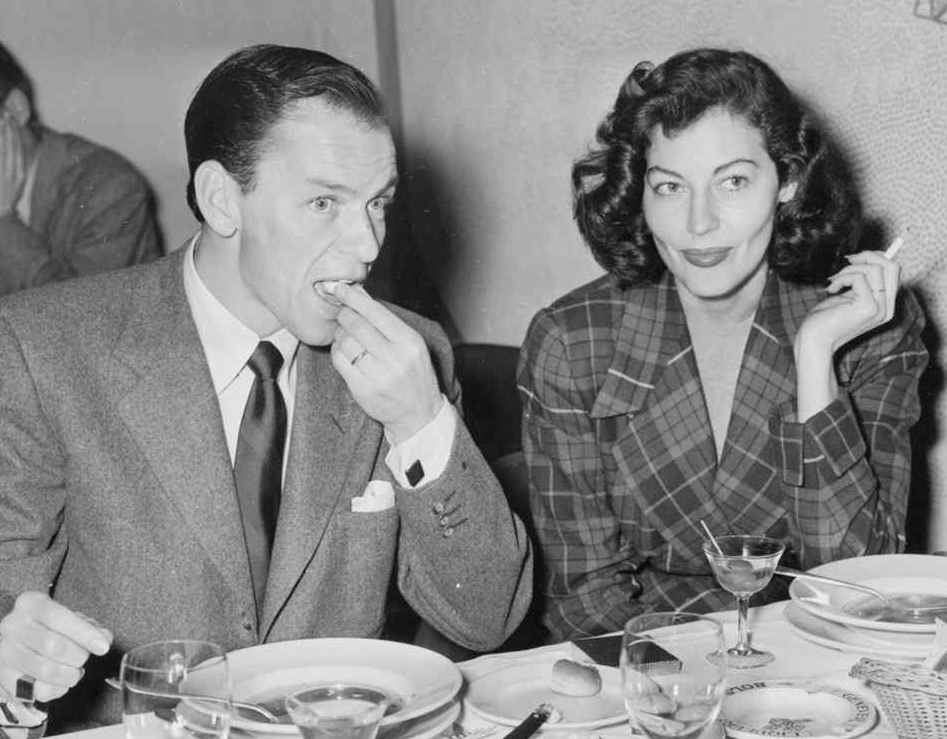
Third husband Frank Sinatra and Gardner in 1951

Sinatra was criticized by gossip columnists Hedda Hopper and Louella Parsons, the Hollywood establishment, the Catholic Church, and by his fans for leaving his wife. Gardner used her considerable influence, particularly with Harry Cohn, to get Sinatra cast in his Oscar-winning role in From Here to Eternity (1953). This role and the award revitalized both Sinatra's acting and singing careers.

The Gardner–Sinatra marriage was tumultuous. During their marriage, Gardner became pregnant twice, but aborted both pregnancies. "MGM had all sorts of penalty clauses about their stars having babies", according to her autobiography, which was published eight months after her death. Gardner filed for divorce in 1954, and the divorce was finalized in 1957. Following their divorce, Gardner and Sinatra remained good friends for the rest of her life.

=== Relationships ===
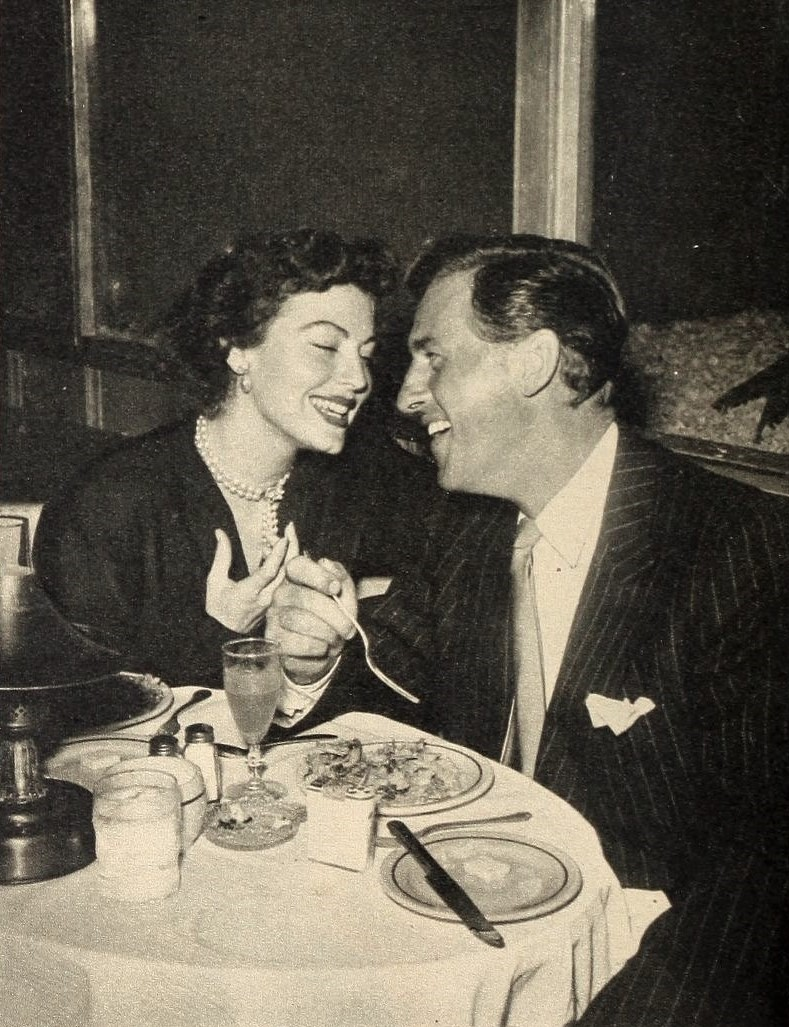
Dining with Stewart Granger in 1950

Gardner became a friend and protegé of businessman and aviator Howard Hughes in the early to mid-1940s, and the relationship lasted into the 1950s. Gardner stated in her autobiography, Ava: My Story, that she was never in love with Hughes, but he was in and out of her life for about 20 years. Hughes' trust in Gardner was what kept their relationship alive. She described him as "painfully shy, completely enigmatic, and more eccentric...than anyone [she] had ever met".

Gardner had several other affairs including with matador Luis Miguel Dominguín, actor George C. Scott, and Claude Terrail, the restaurateur of the Paris restaurant La Tour d'Argent.

Gardner lived her last 35 years outside the United States. She first visited Spain in 1950, and she moved to Madrid in 1955, living there until 1966, when she moved to London. She lived at 34 Ennismore Gardens in Knightsbridge in London, her final residence when she died.

Gardner had a close friendship with Gregory Peck, with whom she starred in three films, the first one being The Great Sinner (1949). Their friendship lasted the rest of Gardner's life, and, upon her death in 1990, Peck took in both her housekeeper and her dog.

=== Religious and political views ===
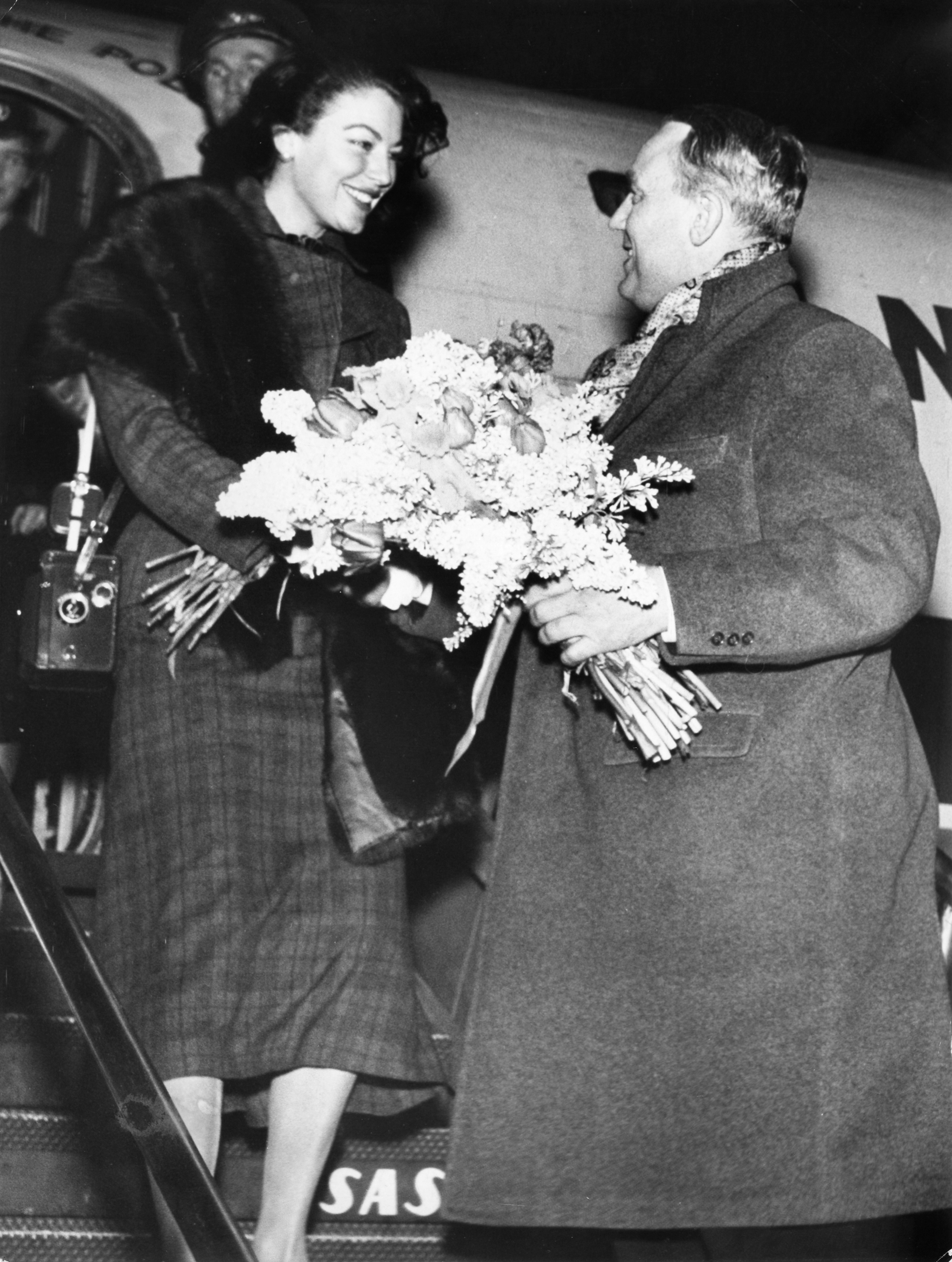
Gardner at Kastrup Airport CPH in Copenhagen (1955)

Although Gardner was raised Baptist, at the end of her life she said she had no religion. Christianity never played a positive role in her life, according to biographers and Gardner, in her autobiography Ava: My Story. Her friend Zoe Sallis, who met her on the set of The Bible: In the Beginning... when Gardner was living with John Huston in Puerto Vallarta, said Gardner always seemed unconcerned about religion.

Another factor that contributed to Gardner's outlook was the death of her father during her youth. She said, "Nobody wanted to know Daddy when he was dying. He was so alone. He was scared. I could see the fear in his eyes when he was smiling. I went to see the preacher, the guy who'd baptized me. I begged him to come and visit Daddy, just to talk to him, you know? Give him a blessing or something. But he never did. I had no time for religion after that."

Concerning politics, Gardner was a lifelong Democrat, and she supported Adlai Stevenson II in the 1952 United States presidential election. Gardner was a staunch supporter of civil rights for African Americans throughout her life. As a child growing up in North Carolina, she would often sit with African American children in segregated parts of movie theaters. Her personal assistant, Rene Jordan, was African American, and Gardner would often take her to clubs that were for whites only. She supported Henry A. Wallace of the Progressive Party, whose campaign in 1948 for the presidential election sought racial equality and desegregation. She became a member of the NAACP in August 1968.

== Death ==
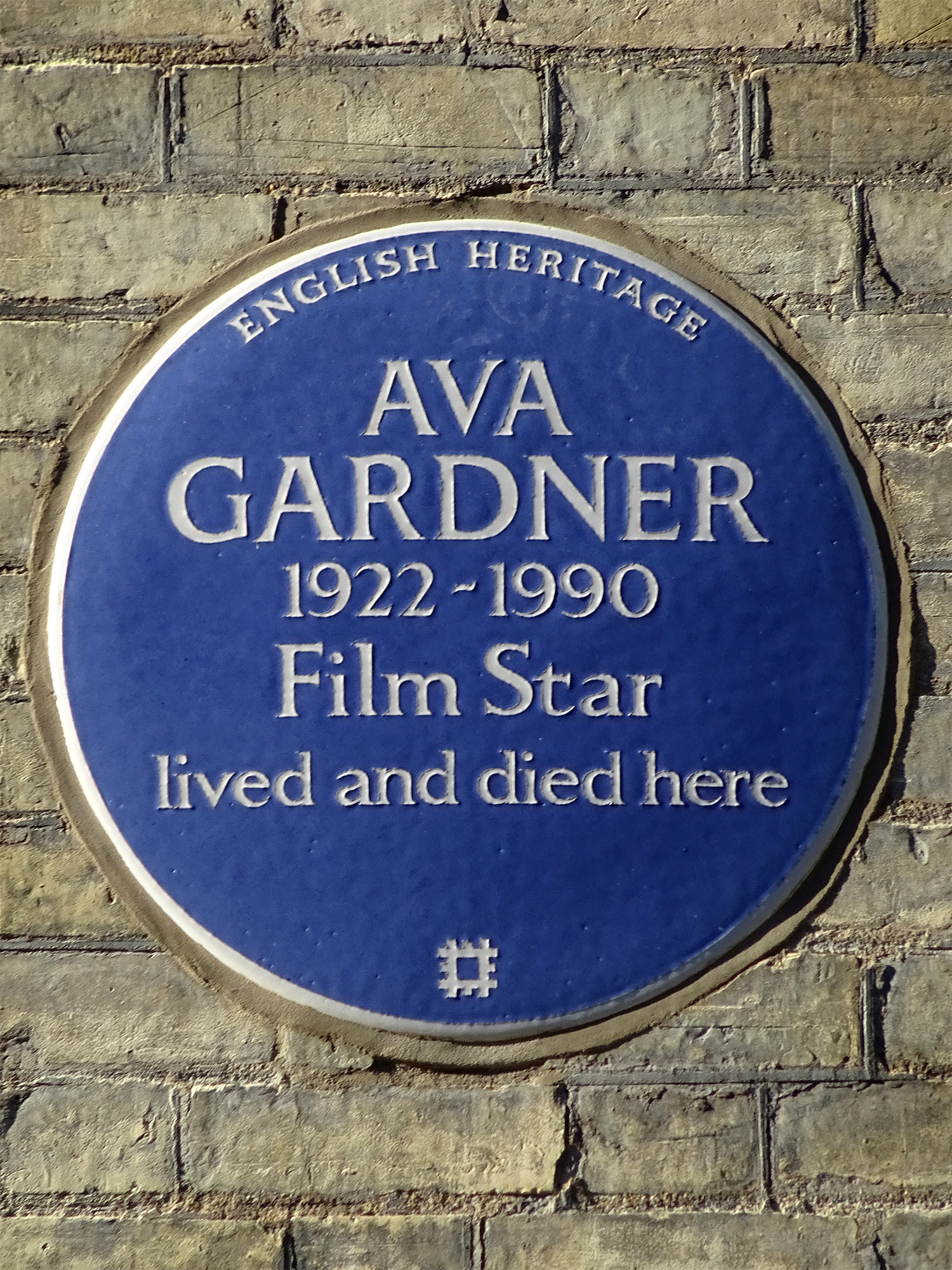
Blue plaque erected by English Heritage

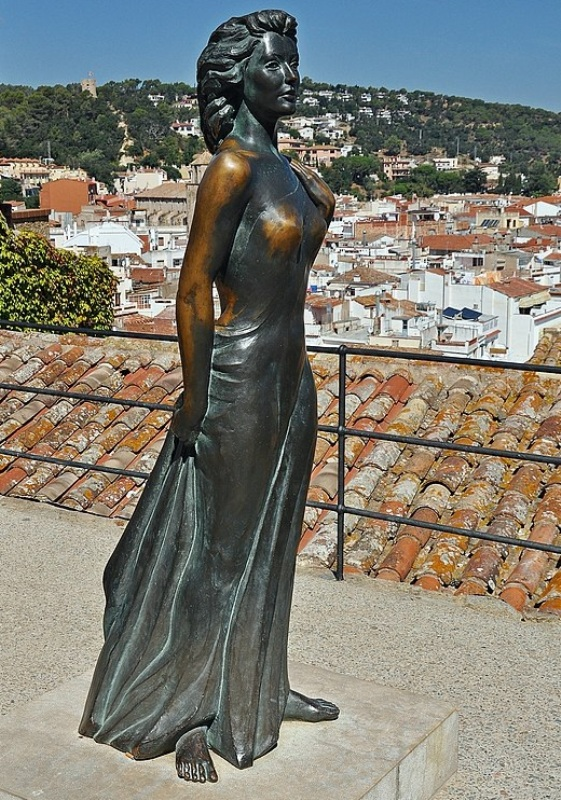
Gardner's statue in Tossa de Mar, Catalonia, Spain

In 1986, Gardner suffered a stroke. Although she could afford her medical expenses, Frank Sinatra wanted to pay for her visit to a specialist in the United States, and she allowed him to make the arrangements for a medically staffed private plane. She died at age 67 of bronchopneumonia on January 25, 1990 in Westminster, London, England.

Gardner was buried on January 29 in Sunset Memorial Park in Smithfield, North Carolina, next to her siblings and their parents, Jonas and Molly Gardner. The Ava Gardner Museum, incorporated in 1996, is located nearby.

== Books ==
Gardner authored a book about her life titled Ava: My Story published by Random House Publishing Group in 1990 with an illustrated reprint by Random House's subsidiary Bantam Books in 1992.

In the last years of her life, Gardner asked Peter Evans to ghostwrite her autobiography, stating: "I either write the book or sell the jewels." Despite meeting with Evans frequently, and approving of most of his copy, Gardner eventually learned that Evans, along with the BBC, had once been sued by her ex-husband Frank Sinatra. Gardner and Evans's friendship subsequently cooled, and Evans left the project. Evans' notes and sections of his draft of Gardner's autobiography, which he based on their taped conversations, were published in his book Ava Gardner: The Secret Conversations after Evans' death in 2012.

== Awards and nominations ==
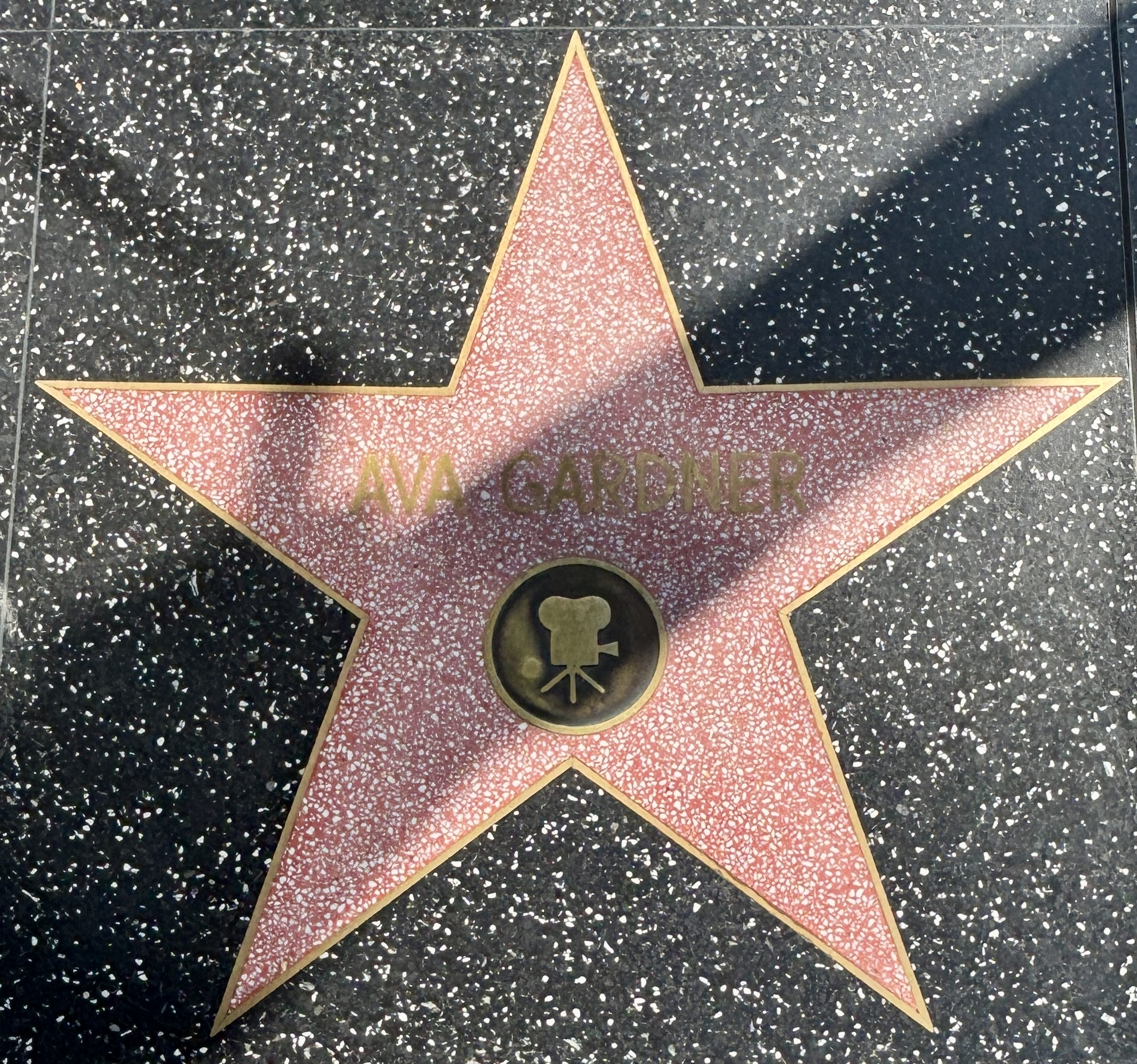
Hollywood Walk of Fame star

Year	Organization	Category	Work	Result	Ref.
1951	Picturegoer Awards	Gold Medal for Best Actress	Pandora and the Flying Dutchman	Nominated	
1953	New York Film Critics Circle	Best Actress	Mogambo	Nominated	
1954	Academy Awards	Best Actress	Mogambo	Nominated	
1957	British Academy Film Awards	Best Foreign Actress	Bhowani Junction	Nominated	
1960	Hollywood Walk of Fame	Star – Motion Pictures	—N/a	Honored	
1960	Golden Laurel	Top Female Star	—N/a	7th place	
1960	British Academy Film Awards	Best Foreign Actress	On the Beach	Nominated	
1964	San Sebastián International Film Festival	Silver Shell for Best Actress	The Night of the Iguana	Won	
1965	Golden Globe Awards	Best Actress in a Motion Picture – Drama	The Night of the Iguana	Nominated	
1965	British Academy Film Awards	Best Foreign Actress	The Night of the Iguana	Nominated	

== Film portrayals ==
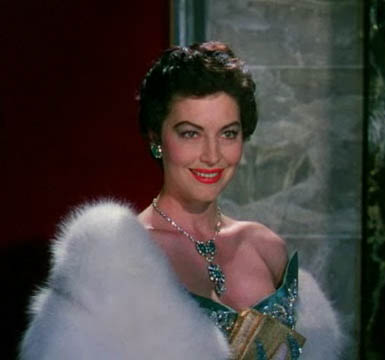
Gardner as Maria Vargas in The Barefoot Contessa (1954)

Gardner has been portrayed by Marcia Gay Harden in the 1992 miniseries Sinatra, by Deborah Kara Unger in the 1998 television film The Rat Pack, by Kate Beckinsale in the 2004 Howard Hughes biopic The Aviator, Anna Drijver in the 2012 Italian TV film Walter Chiari – Fino all'ultima risata, and Emily Elicia Low in Frank & Ava (2018).

The images of Gardner and Clark Gable are featured on the cover of Robin Gibb's 1983 album How Old Are You?

The 2018 Spanish television series Arde Madrid is a comedy-drama with thriller elements based on elements of Ava Gardner's life in mid-20th century Spain. Gardner is portrayed by Debi Mazar.

== Filmography ==
=== Film ===
Year	Title	Role	Notes
1941	Fancy Answers	Girl at Recital	short film uncredited
1941	Strange Testament	Waitress	short film uncredited
1941	Shadow of the Thin Man	Passerby	uncredited
1941	H. M. Pulham, Esq.	Young Socialite	uncredited
1941	Babes on Broadway	Audience member	uncredited
1942	We Were Dancing	Girl	uncredited
1942	Joe Smith, American	Miss Maynard, Secretary	uncredited
1942	This Time for Keeps	Girl in car lighting cigarette	uncredited
1942	We Do It Because	Lucretia Borgia	short film uncredited
1942	Kid Glove Killer	Car Hop	uncredited
1942	Sunday Punch	Ringsider	uncredited
1942	Calling Dr. Gillespie	Student at finishing school	uncredited
1942	Mighty Lak a Goat	Girl at the Bijou box office	short film uncredited
1942	Reunion in France	Marie, a salesgirl	uncredited
1943	Du Barry Was a Lady	Perfume Girl	uncredited
1943	Pilot No.5	Girl	uncredited
1943	Hitler's Madman	Franciska Pritric, a Student	uncredited
1943	Ghosts on the Loose	Betty	
1943	Young Ideas	Co-ed	uncredited
1943	Swing Fever	Receptionist	uncredited
1943	Lost Angel	Hat Check Girl	uncredited
1944	Two Girls and a Sailor	Dream Girl	uncredited
1944	Three Men in White	Jean Brown	
1944	Maisie Goes to Reno	Gloria Fullerton	
1944	Blonde Fever	bit role	uncredited
1945	She Went to the Races	Hilda Spotts	
1946	Whistle Stop	Mary	
1946	The Killers	Kitty Collins	
1947	The Hucksters	Jean Ogilvie	
1947	Singapore	Linda Grahame/Ann Van Leyden	
1948	One Touch of Venus	Venus/Venus Jones	
1949	The Bribe	Elizabeth Hintten	
1949	The Great Sinner	Pauline Ostrovsky	
1949	East Side, West Side	Isabel Lorrison	
1951	My Forbidden Past	Barbara Beaurevel	
1951	Pandora and the Flying Dutchman	Pandora Reynolds	
1951	Show Boat	Julie LaVerne	
1952	Lone Star	Martha Ronda	
1952	The Snows of Kilimanjaro	Cynthia Green	
1953	The Band Wagon	Herself	uncredited
1953	Ride, Vaquero!	Cordelia Cameron	
1953	Mogambo	Eloise "Honey Bear" Kelly	nominated—Academy Award for Best Actress
1953	Knights of the Round Table	Guinevere	
1954	The Barefoot Contessa	Maria Vargas	
1956	Bhowani Junction	Victoria Jones	nominated—BAFTA for Best Foreign Actress
1957	The Little Hut	Lady Susan Ashlow	
1957	The Sun Also Rises	Lady Brett Ashley	
1958	The Naked Maja	Maria Cayetana, Duchess of Alba	
1959	On the Beach	Moira Davidson	nominated—BAFTA for Best Foreign Actress
1960	The Angel Wore Red	Soledad	
1963	55 Days at Peking	Baroness Natalie Ivanoff	
1964	Seven Days in May	Eleanor Holbrook	
1964	The Night of the Iguana	Maxine Faulk	Nominated—BAFTA for Best Foreign Actress; Nominated—Golden Globe Award for Best Actress in a Motion Picture – Drama; Silver Shell for Best Actress
1966	The Bible: In the Beginning...	Sarah	
1968	Mayerling	Empress Elizabeth	
1970	Tam Lin	Michaela (Mickey) Cazaret	
1972	The Life and Times of Judge Roy Bean	Lillie Langtry	
1974	Earthquake	Remy Royce-Graff	
1975	Permission to Kill	Katina Petersen	
1976	The Blue Bird	Luxury	
1976	The Cassandra Crossing	Nicole Dressler	
1977	The Sentinel	Miss Logan	
1979	City on Fire	Maggie Grayson	
1980	The Kidnapping of the President	Second Lady Beth Richards	
1981	Priest of Love	Mabel Dodge Luhan	
1983	Regina Roma	Mama	one-set drama

=== Television ===
Year	Title	Role	Notes
1953	What's My Line	Herself, as Mystery Guest	first TV show appearance
1985	Knots Landing	Ruth Sumner Galveston	7 episodes
1985	A.D.	Agrippina	TV mini series – 5 episodes
1985	The Long Hot Summer	Minnie Littlejohn	TV mini series – 2 episodes
1986	Harem	Kadin	TV movie
1986	Maggie	Diane Webb	TV movie

== See also ==
- List of people named Ava
- List of barefooters
