= Ava Gardner: The Secret Conversations =

2013 book by Peter Evans

- Hardback edition
- Author: Peter Evans (author)
- Language: English
- Genre: Biography
- Publisher: Simon & Schuster
- Publication date: July 2, 2013
- Publication place: United States
- Media type: Print (hardcover & paperback), e-book
- Pages: 304
- ISBN: 9781451627695

Ava Gardner: The Secret Conversations is a biography of Hollywood legend Ava Gardner written by British journalist Peter Evans and published by Simon & Schuster in 2013. The book is based on conversations Evans had with Gardner between 1988 and 1990. Though Gardner initially invited Evans to write her autobiography, they had a falling out, and she fired him. Evans eventually secured the rights to publish their conversations, and worked on the book before his death in 2012. The book uses their conversations, with supplemental material from interviews Evans conducted with other people who knew Gardner.

== Background ==
In the first week of January 1988, Ava Gardner asked me to ghost her memoirs.

— Peter Evans, Ava Gardner: The Secret Conversations (2013)

Gardner invited Evans to ghostwrite her autobiography in 1988. Evans interviewed Gardner face to face on several occasions, and they also had frequent phone conversations. Initially, Gardner was satisfied with Evans' copy but they began to have trouble working together, and eventually Gardner fired Evans after she learned that her ex-husband Frank Sinatra had previously sued Evans for libel successfully. She then finished her autobiography, Ava: My Story with other writers. Ava: My Story was published in 1990, a few months after her death.

Evans eventually obtained permission from Gardner's former manager, who was placed in charge of her estate, to use the transcripts of his interviews and conversations with Gardner.

== Editions ==
Simon & Schuster published Ava Gardner: The Secret Conversations in hardcover on July 2, 2013. They published the softcover edition a year later, July 8, 2014. An ebook edition was released the same time as the hardcover edition.

== Reception ==
The biography received positive reviews. Maureen Dowd of The New York Times called it "mesmerizing"; Publishers Weekly wrote it's "an irresistible read for Hollywood history buffs".
