= Ham & Yam Festival =

North Carolina community festival

- Frequency: Annually
- Locations: Smithfield, North Carolina
- Inaugurated: 1985
- Most recent: 2025
- Next event: 2026
- Website: www.johnstoncountync.org/ham-and-yam-festival/

The Ham & Yam Festival is an annual community agricultural festival in Smithfield, North Carolina. It began in 1985 and honors agriculture in Johnston County, specifically the pork and sweet potato (often referred to as "yam") industries. It takes place in May.

== Context ==
North Carolina is the leading producer of sweet potatoes in the United States, and Johnston County is one of the top producing counties in the state. Johnston County is also a major producer of pork and pork products, and features numerous traditional eastern North Carolina barbecue restaurants.

== History ==
The festival was founded in 1985 as a competition between Smithfield, North Carolina and Smithfield, Virginia, two top pork producing towns. Five of the leading ham producing companies of Johnston County launched the festival and held a series of pork competitions, with the North Carolina town taking first and second in one category and second in the other.

Over the decades, the festival has grown into a major regional attraction. It has become known for musical entertainment, art and food vendors, and family-friendly activities.

The 2020 and 2021 festivals were canceled due to the COVID-19 pandemic.

== Attractions ==
The festival includes vendors, food trucks, live music, a barbecue competition, 5K race, rubber duck race, and a petting zoo. It also includes the “What’s That Yam Thing?” contest, in which school-aged children create artistic works from sweet potatoes.

The 2025 festival had about 10,000 attendees.

Headlining acts have included:

- Sister Hazel (2026)
- Nantucket (2017)
- James Wesley (2016)
- Night Ranger (2011)
- Little River Band (2009)
- The Marshall Tucker Band (2008)

== See also ==
- Smithfield, North Carolina
