= West Smithfield, North Carolina =

Unincorporated community in North Carolina, US

- Former census-designated place
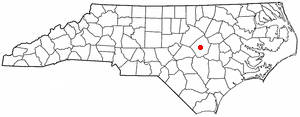
- Location of West Smithfield, North Carolina
- Coordinates: 35°32′22″N 78°22′36″W
- Country: United States
- State: North Carolina
- County: Johnston

Area
  - Total: 0.54 sq mi (1.4 km^{2})
  - Land: 0.54 sq mi (1.4 km^{2})
  - Water: 0 sq mi (0.0 km^{2})
- Elevation: 154 ft (47 m)

Population (2000)
  - Total: 59
  - Density: 112/sq mi (43.1/km^{2})
- Time zone: UTC-5 (Eastern (EST))
  - Summer (DST): UTC-4 (EDT)
- FIPS code: 37-72950
- GNIS feature ID: 1023180

West Smithfield is an unincorporated community and former census-designated place and is now a district of Smithfield, North Carolina in Johnston County, North Carolina, United States. The population was last recorded separately from Smithfield in 2000, when 59 people resided in the CDP.

== Geography ==
West Smithfield is located in central Johnston County at 35°32′22″N 78°22′36″W (35.539359, -78.376710), in the northwestern part of the town of Smithfield. It is separated from the rest of Smithfield by the Neuse River. U.S. Route 70 Business passes through the neighborhood, leading southeast to the center of Smithfield and northwest 11 miles (18 km) to Clayton.

According to the United States Census Bureau, the CDP had an area of 0.5 square miles (1.3 km^{2}), all land.

== Demographics ==
As of the census of 2000, there were 59 people, 21 households, and 16 families residing in the CDP. The population density was 111.6 inhabitants per square mile (43.1/km^{2}). There were 23 housing units at an average density of 43.5 per square mile (16.8/km^{2}). The racial makeup of the CDP was 42.37% White, 42.37% African American, 15.25% from other races. Hispanic or Latino of any race were 20.34% of the population.

There were 21 households, out of which 42.9% had children under the age of 18 living with them, 66.7% were married couples living together, 4.8% had a female householder with no husband present, and 23.8% were non-families. 19.0% of all households were made up of individuals, and 9.5% had someone living alone who was 65 years of age or older. The average household size was 2.81 and the average family size was 3.25.

In the CDP the population was spread out, with 33.9% under the age of 18, 1.7% from 18 to 24, 25.4% from 25 to 44, 33.9% from 45 to 64, and 5.1% who were 65 years of age or older. The median age was 30 years. For every 100 females, there were 96.7 males. For every 100 females age 18 and over, there were 95.0 males.

The median income for a household in the CDP was $47,500, and the median income for a family was $56,071. Males had a median income of $19,773 versus $50,556 for females. The per capita income for the CDP was $22,834. None of the population and none of the families were below the poverty line.
