= Ava Gardner Museum =

Coordinates: 35.5109°N 78.3451°W

- Location within North Carolina
- Established: 1941
- Location: Smithfield, North Carolina, U.S.
- Type: Biographical museum
- Website: www.johnstoncountync.org/ava-gardner

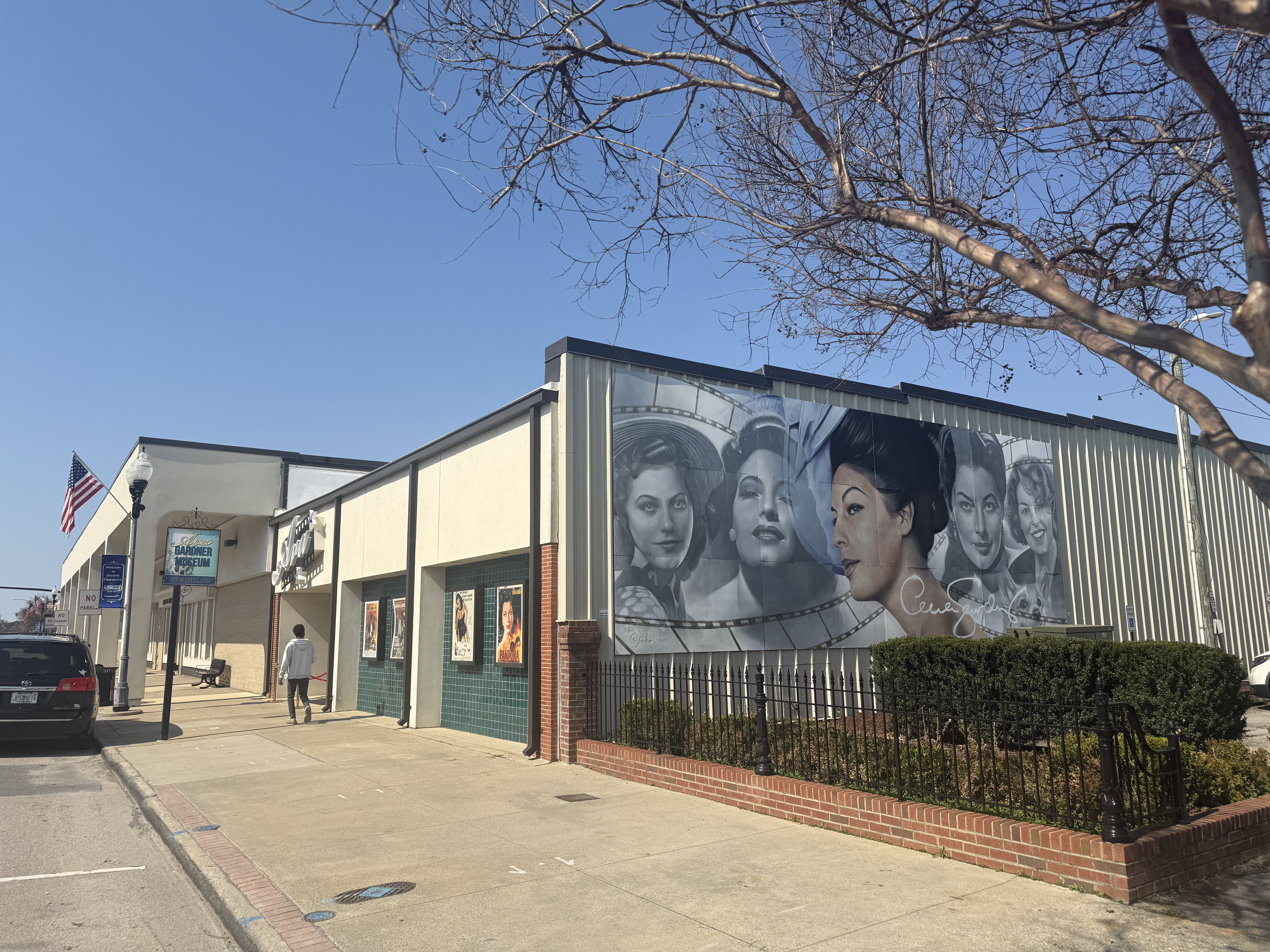
Ava Gardner Museum

The Ava Gardner Museum is a museum dedicated to American actress Ava Gardner. Located in downtown Smithfield, North Carolina, the museum holds an extensive collection of artifacts from Gardner's career and private life. The museum usually attracts 7,000 visitors a year.

== History ==
The original collection was started in 1941 by a fan, Thomas "Tom" Banks, who at age 12 met Ava on the campus of Atlantic Christian College (now Barton College), where she was studying to become a secretary. When she did not return to school the next year, he saw a photograph of Gardner in a newspaper and learned that she had been signed to a movie contract with MGM.

Banks and his wife, Lorraine, collected memorabilia and artifacts related to Gardner. In the early 1980s, Dr. Banks purchased the Brogden Teacherage building, the house where Ava lived from ages 2 to 13, and created a small display to the actress.

Following Thomas Banks' death in 1989, Lorraine Banks donated the museum's collection to the town of Smithfield. In 1999, the museum purchased its current home, a renovated 6,400 square foot building in downtown Smithfield.

In 2020, the building experienced a flood due to a broken toilet. None of the collections were damaged, but repairs required the museum to close for a few weeks.

The museum held a grant for digitization and preservation of their collection, but this was canceled early by the Institute of Museum and Library Services in 2025.
