= Howard S. Cullman =

American civil servant (1891–1972)

Chairman of the Board of the Port Authority of New York and New Jersey
- In office 1945–1955
- Preceded by: Frank Ferguson
- Succeeded by: Donald V. Lowe

Board Member of the Port Authority of New York and New Jersey
- In office 1927–1969
- Nominated by: Al Smith

Personal details
- Born: Howard Stix Cullman; September 23, 1891
- Died: June 29, 1972 (aged 80) New York City, U.S.
- Education: Yale University

Howard S. Cullman (September 23, 1891 – June 29, 1972) was an American civil servant, philanthropist, theatrical investor, and political organizer. He served on the board of the Port Authority of New York and New Jersey for 42 years—acting as its Chairman from 1945 to 1955—and was actively involved in civic projects as well as in the financing and support of American theatre productions.

== Biography ==
Howard Stix Cullman was born on September 23, 1891, to millionaire Joseph F. and Zillah Stix Cullman; his grandfather, Ferdinand Cullman, had amassed a fortune in the tobacco industry. He graduated from Yale University in 1913.

In 1927, he was appointed by Governor Al Smith to the board of the Port Authority of New York and New Jersey, where he served until 1969. In 1945, Cullman was elected Chairman of the Board by a 9–1 vote, working closely with executive director Austin Tobin, and earning a reputation as Tobin’s "right-hand man." He also served as Treasurer for Franklin Delano Roosevelt’s New York gubernatorial campaigns in 1928 and 1930.

In 1958, President Dwight Eisenhower appointed Cullman Commissioner General—with the rank of Ambassador—to represent the United States at the Brussels World’s Fair.

His son, Hugh Cullman, married the singer Nan Alva Ogburn.

== Theatre Involvement ==
Cullman played an influential role in the American theatre scene. In 1932, he was appointed court receiver for the financially troubled Roxy Theatre in New York, where he successfully turned its deficits into profits within five years. In 1944, he joined a syndicate that acquired the old Hammerstein's Theatre (later known as the Ed Sullivan Theater). Two years later, Cullman brokered a deal with CBS that allowed the network to continue using Hammerstein’s as a broadcast studio, while he leased the Alvin Theatre (now the Neil Simon Theatre) for live Broadway productions.

Together with his wife, Marguerite, Cullman financed numerous Broadway productions from the 1940s through the 1960s. His investments supported hit shows including Life With Father, Oklahoma!, Carousel, Brigadoon, South Pacific, Annie Get Your Gun, Fiddler on the Roof, Teahouse of the August Moon, Death of a Salesman, and A Streetcar Named Desire. It is estimated that he was involved in financing around 300 productions between 1938 and 1961, significantly influencing the financial landscape of Broadway.

== Civic Activities ==
Cullman’s civic involvement was extensive. In 1931, Governor Franklin D. Roosevelt appointed him chairman of a state committee to reform workmen’s compensation insurance practices. During the 1930s, he also served as president of New York’s Beekman Street Hospital and as a director of the Flower Fifth Avenue Hospital, advocating for hospital modernization and improved public health measures.

In the late 1950s, Cullman chaired a fundraising committee to support free Shakespearean theatre in New York City parks—a program that eventually evolved into the renowned Shakespeare in the Park initiative. He was also active in Jewish community organizations, contributing to groups such as ORT and the Jewish Social Service Association, which provided vocational training and social services.

== Political Engagements ==
An active participant in New York Democratic politics, Cullman was instrumental in fundraising and organizing for the party. He served as treasurer for Franklin Delano Roosevelt’s New York gubernatorial campaigns in 1928 and 1930, contributing to the successes of those electoral efforts. His political work extended to organizing support for state candidates and initiatives, collaborating with prominent Democratic figures such as Alfred E. Smith, Herbert H. Lehman, and John J. Raskob. Notably, his bipartisan respect was underscored when President Dwight Eisenhower appointed him as Commissioner General to the Brussels World’s Fair in 1958.

== See also ==
- Austin Tobin
- Eugenius Harvey Outerbridge
- Christopher O. Ward
