= Peter Evans (author) =

British journalist and author (died 2012)

Peter Evans (c. 1934–2012) was a British journalist who wrote for the Daily Express, and also wrote several unauthorized biographies of public figures including Aristotle Onassis and the Kennedy family. He died in 2012, at the age of 78.

== Publications ==
- Nemesis: The True Story of Aristotle Onassis, Jackie O, and the Love Triangle That Brought Down the Kennedys (2004) (ReganBooks)
- Ari: The Life and Times of Aristotle Socrates Onassis
- Ava Gardner: The Secret Conversations (2013)
- The Mask Behind the Mask, a Life of Peter Sellers
- Goodbye Baby & Amen
- The Englishman's Daughter
- Titles
- Behind Palace Doors (with Nigel Dempster)
