= Nan Ogburn Cullman =

American singer and philanthropist

- Born: Nan Alva Ogburn; May 22, 1929; Smithfield, North Carolina, U.S.
- Died: May 18, 2015 (aged 85); Pittsboro, North Carolina, U.S.
- Education: Juilliard School; University of North Carolina at Chapel Hill; Columbia University; Heidelberg University
- Occupations: opera singer philanthropist
- Spouse: Hugh Cullman
- Relatives: Lu Long Ogburn Medlin (sister)

Nan Alva Ogburn Cullman (May 22, 1929 – May 18, 2015) was an American opera singer, explorer, and philanthropist.

== Early life and education ==
Cullman was born Nan Alva Ogburn on May 22, 1929 in Smithfield, North Carolina. She was the daughter of Jasper Victor Ogburn Sr. and Bunnah Evelyn Jones Ogburn. Her father was a cotton broker and the owner of the Austin-Ogburn Cotton Company. She was the sister of beauty queen Lu Long Ogburn and the local politician Vic Ogburn Jr.

When she was fifteen years old, she won a scholarship to study music at the Juilliard School in New York City. She also studied at the University of North Carolina at Chapel Hill, Columbia University, and Heidelberg University.

== Career and philanthropy ==
Cullman performed with various regional opera companies and choral societies, including the Westchester Opera Company in Westchester County, New York. Her favorite role to sing was Fiordiligi from Wolfgang Amadeus Mozart’s Così fan tutte.

She volunteered for hospitals and churches in New York and served on the boards of Youth Consultation Services of New York and the North Carolina Symphony.

In 2013, Cullman named the Johnston County Heritage Center as a beneficiary of $75,000 over a ten year period from a charitable trust that she established. She bequeathed $2 million to Johnston County, North Carolina for scholarships for school students.

== Personal life and death ==
On May 12, 1951, she married Lieutenant Hugh Cullman, an officer in the United States Navy Reserve, at First Baptist Church in Smithfield. Her husband was the son of Howard S. Cullman, Chairman of the Port Authority of New York and New Jersey. Their wedding reception was held at the Smithfield Woman's Club. The couple lived in Westchester County, New York for 40 years before moving to Beaufort, North Carolina in 1993 and then Pittsboro, North Carolina.

She was an avid traveller, riding camels with the Tuareg tribe in Algeria, summiting Mount Kilimanjaro, and climbing part of Mount Everest. She was one of the first people to obtain a visa to hike through Bhutan.

She died on May 18, 2015, following a stroke at her home in Pittsboro.

== Legacy ==
In June 2017, the Johnston County Board of Commissioners created the Nan Ogburn Cullman Education Endowment for Johnston County, which is administered by the North Carolina Community Foundation.
