= Ava Shamban =

American dermatologist

Ava T. Shamban is an American celebrity dermatologist who has made numerous appearances on television and cosmetic publications as an authority on the subject. She is currently a board-certified dermatologist based in Los Angeles, and founder of Ava MD.

== Biography ==
=== Education ===
Shamban graduated from Harvard University before receiving her medical degree from Case Western Reserve University School of Medicine. She completed an internal medicine internship at the Mount Sinai Medical Center and went into practice as a general practitioner in California for two years. She then received a Dermatology Foundation Fellowship for the study of extracellular matrix proteins, with Dr Jouni Uitto. Shamban continued on to complete her dermatology residency at Harbor-UCLA Medical Center in 1989 and is currently a member of the American Society for Dermatologic Surgery as well as the American Academy of Dermatology, and also serves on the editorial board of The Journal of Clinical and Aesthetic Dermatology.

=== Career ===
Shamban was a recurring cast member of the ABC TV show "Extreme Makeover," from 2003-2007, where she provided skincare consultations for participants. She also appeared on multiple episodes of the TV show "The Doctors," where she discussed skin care issues.

Shamban is the owner and director of two dermatology practices in Los Angeles. The Santa Monica practice has been open for 20 years, while the Beverly Hills location opened 9 years ago. Shamban also serves as Assistant Clinical Professor of Dermatology at the UCLA Geffen School of Medicine.

Shamban has authored one book, and is involved in research and clinical trials for dermatologic products and devices. She has also recently become the host of the new Condé Nast Entertainment digital series, “Dr. Ava Says” as an Allure Insider.

=== Media appearances ===
Dr. Shamban has been interviewed and cited as a source in numerous health and wellness publications, including Women's Health, Los Angeles Times, The Huffington Post, The New York Times, Allure, Vanity Fair, EmpowHer, Teen Vogue, and Byrdie,

== Professional activities ==
Shamban has lectured on topics ranging from medical and cosmetic to laser dermatology and practice management:

- "What is Beauty?" Cosmetic Bootcamp Extenders Winter Session, Vegas, NV, December 4–6, 2014.
- "Optimizing Your Practice," 2014 ASDS Annual Meeting, San Diego, CA, November 6–9, 2014.
- "Soft-tissue Filler and Neuromodulator Mini-workshop," ASDS, Chicago, IL, October, 2013.

She is also a member of the Los Angeles Metropolitan Dermatological Society, the American Academy of Dermatology, the American Society for Laser Medicine and Surgery, the American Society for Dermatologic Surgery, the California Academy of Cosmetic Surgery, and the Dermatological and Aesthetic Surgery International League.

== Publications ==
- "Heal Your Skin: The Breakthrough Plan for Renewal," ISBN 0470532157
- Dr. Shamban has also authored publications in medical journals and book chapters

== Articles ==
- The Potential Role of Topically Applied Heparan Sulfate in the Treatment of Photodamage. Gallo RL, Bucay VW, Shamban AT, Lima-Maribona J, Lewis AB, Ditre CM, Mayoral FA, Gold MH.
- Facial treatment preferences in aesthetically aware women. Narurkar V1, Shamban A, Sissins P, Stonehouse A, Gallagher C.
- Photopneumatic technology used in combination with profusion therapy for the treatment of acne. Narurkar VA1, Gold M, Shamban AT.
