= Lu Long Ogburn Medlin =

American beauty queen

- Born: Lu Long Ogburn; May 31, 1932; Smithfield, North Carolina, U.S.
- Died: April 5, 2025 (aged 92); Smithfield, North Carolina, U.S.
- Education: Salem College (BMus)
- Spouse: Thomas Eastwood Medlin
- Children: 4
- Relatives: Nan Ogburn Cullman (sister)
- Beauty pageant titleholder
- Title: Miss North Carolina 1951
- Major competition: Miss America 1952 (2nd runner-up)

Lu Long Ogburn Medlin (May 31, 1932 – April 5, 2025) was an American beauty pageant titleholder. She won the Miss North Carolina pageant in 1951 and placed second runner-up in the Miss America 1952 pageant, winning the Preliminary Talent Award and the Preliminary Swimsuit Award.

== Early life and education ==
Medlin was born Lu Long Ogburn on May 31, 1932 in Smithfield, North Carolina, to Jasper Victor Ogburn Sr., a cotton broker and owner of the Austin-Ogburn Cotton Company, and Bunnah Evelyn Jones Ogburn. She was the sister of the philanthropist Nan Alva Ogburn and the local politician Vic Ogburn Jr.

Medlin studied music, taking piano lessons from Flora Canaday. She played basketball at Smithfield High School, winning two Johnston County championships and was named to the All-State girls' team and named to the All-County team for four consecutive years. With nearly 2,000 points throughout her high school basketball career, she became the all-time scoring leader in Johnston County. She went on to attend Salem College for four years, where she majored in piano. Medlin was senior class president at Salem, was active in school sports, and served as the college's 27th May Queen. She was listed in the Who's Who of American Colleges and Universities.

== Pageants ==
In 1950, Medlin won the Miss Smithfield pageant. In 1951, during her freshman year at Salem College, Medlin won the Miss North Carolina pageant. She played the piano for the talent portion of the competition. She went on to compete at Miss America 1952, placing second runner-up overall and winning the talent and swimsuit competitions. For the talent portion of the Miss America pageant, Medlin performed "Malagueña" on the piano.

In 1953, Medlin was crowned the Queen of the Court for the Buggs Island Lake dedication in Clarksville, Virginia.

== Personal life and death ==
On September 18, 1954, she married Thomas Eastwood Medlin at Smithfield Baptist Church. Their wedding reception was held at Johnston County Country Club. She and Thomas had four children.

Medlin was inducted into the Johnston County Athletic Hall of Fame on May 7, 2022.

She died on April 5, 2025 at the Brookdale senior living facility in Smithfield, North Carolina.
