= Smithfield, North Carolina =

Town in and county seat of Johnston County, North Carolina

- Town
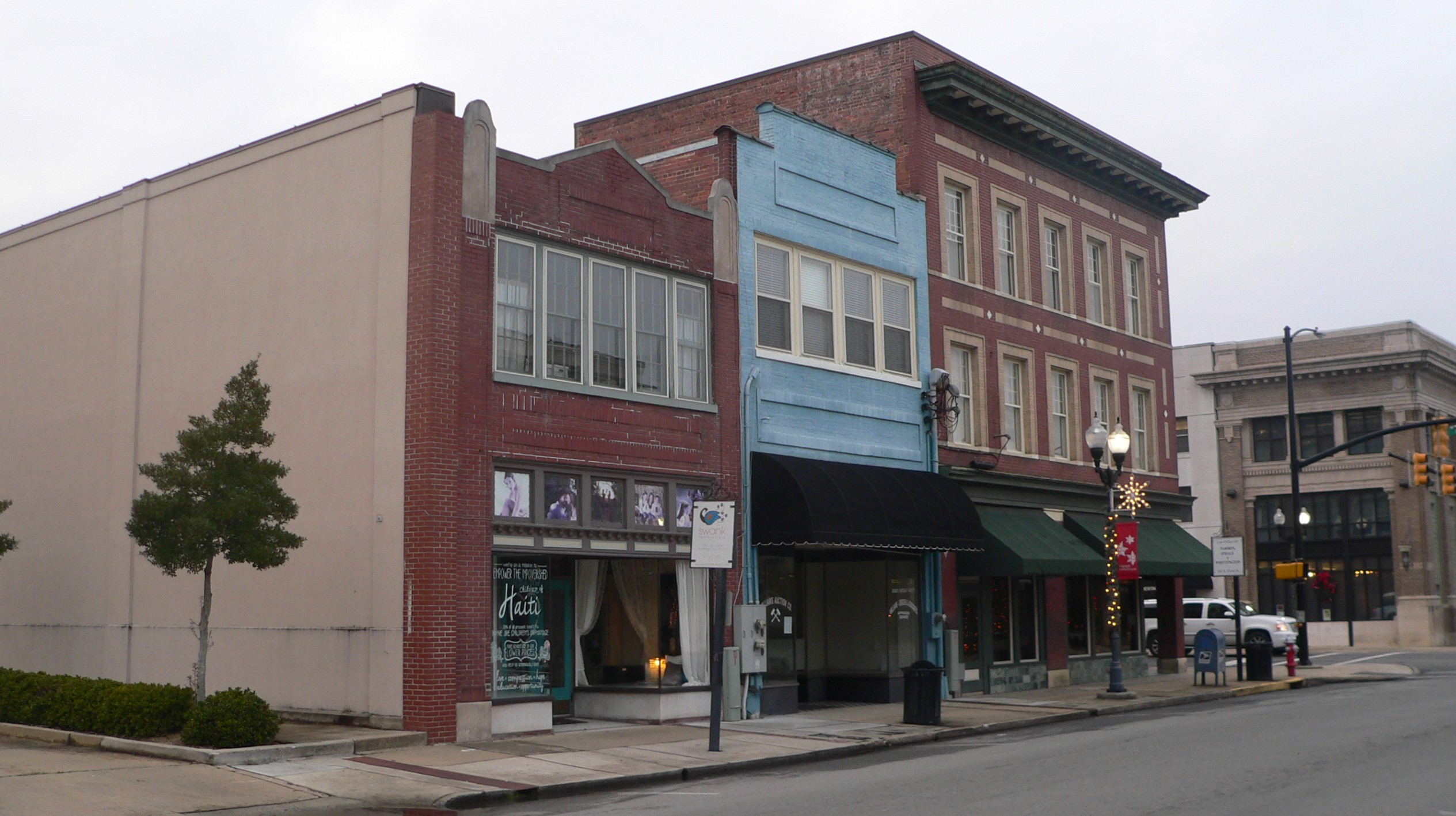
- Downtown Smithfield Historic District

- Seal

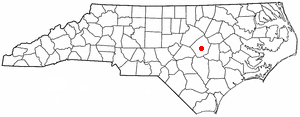
- Location in Johnston County and the state of North Carolina

- Location in the United States
- Coordinates: 35°30′50″N 78°21′00″W
- Country: United States
- State: North Carolina
- County: Johnston
- Townships: Selma, Smithfield, Wilson Mills
- Chartered: April 23, 1777 (249 years ago)
- Named for: John Smith

Government
  - Type: Council–Manager
  - Council: Town Council
  - Manager: Michael Scott

Area
  - Total: 12.39 sq mi (32.08 km^{2})
  - Land: 12.37 sq mi (32.05 km^{2})
  - Water: 0.015 sq mi (0.04 km^{2})
- Elevation: 125 ft (38 m)

Population (2020)
  - Total: 11,292
  - Density: 912.6/sq mi (352.34/km^{2})
- Time zone: UTC−5 (Eastern (EST))
  - Summer (DST): UTC−4 (EDT)
- ZIP code: 27577
- Area code: 919
- FIPS code: 37-62520
- GNIS feature ID: 2407352
- Major airport: RDU
- Website: smithfield-nc.com

Smithfield is a town in and the county seat of Johnston County, North Carolina, United States. As of the 2020 census, its population was 11,292. The town is located near North Carolina's Research Triangle and is about 30 miles (48 km) southeast of downtown Raleigh. The Raleigh-Durham-Cary combined statistical area has a population over 2 million residents.

Smithfield is home to the Ava Gardner Museum, Wild Bill's Western Town named Shadowhawk, and is situated along the Neuse River, where visitors enjoy the annual Ham & Yam Festival, walks along the Buffalo Creek Greenway, and the historic downtown district.

== History ==
Smithfield, Johnston County's first town and second county seat after Hinton's Quarter, was chartered by the North Carolina General Assembly on April 23, 1777.

== Geography ==
Smithfield is in central Johnston County and is bordered to the northeast by Selma. Interstate 95 runs along the southeastern edge of the town, with access from Exits 93, 95, and 97. I-95 leads northeast 46 miles (74 km) to Rocky Mount and southwest the same distance to Fayetteville. U.S. Route 301 passes through Selma on Brightleaf Boulevard, leading northeast 4 miles (6 km) to the center of Selma and southwest 15 miles (24 km) to Benson. U.S. Route 70 passes just northeast of Smithfield, leading northwest 30 miles (48 km) to Raleigh, and southeast 22 miles (35 km) to Goldsboro. U.S. Route 70 Business passes through the center of Smithfield as Market Street.

According to the U.S. Census Bureau, the town has a total area of 12.1 square miles (31.4 km^{2}), of which 0.02 sq mi (0.04 km^{2}), or 0.11%, is covered by water. The Neuse River runs through the town west of the downtown area, separating it from the neighborhood of West Smithfield.

=== Climate ===
Smithfield has a humid subtropical climate(Cfa), with cool winters and hot summers. Its climate is famous for the growth of pine forests with laurel understory as well as live oaks.

Climate data for Smithfield, North Carolina(1991-2020 normals)
Month	Jan	Feb	Mar	Apr	May	Jun	Jul	Aug	Sep	Oct	Nov	Dec	Year
Mean daily maximum °F (°C)	53.6 (12.0)	57.0 (13.9)	64.5 (18.1)	74.1 (23.4)	81.0 (27.2)	88.9 (31.6)	91.7 (33.2)	89.3 (31.8)	83.6 (28.7)	74.3 (23.5)	64.4 (18.0)	56.7 (13.7)	73.3 (22.9)
Daily mean °F (°C)	42.5 (5.8)	45.2 (7.3)	51.9 (11.1)	60.8 (16.0)	69.2 (20.7)	77.1 (25.1)	81.2 (27.3)	78.9 (26.1)	73.3 (22.9)	62.2 (16.8)	51.7 (10.9)	45.2 (7.3)	61.6 (16.4)
Mean daily minimum °F (°C)	31.4 (−0.3)	33.3 (0.7)	39.3 (4.1)	47.5 (8.6)	57.4 (14.1)	65.9 (18.8)	70.8 (21.6)	68.6 (20.3)	62.9 (17.2)	50.1 (10.1)	39.0 (3.9)	33.8 (1.0)	50.0 (10.0)
Average precipitation inches (mm)	3.45 (88)	3.31 (84)	4.01 (102)	3.69 (94)	4.20 (107)	4.67 (119)	5.54 (141)	5.28 (134)	5.51 (140)	3.21 (82)	3.25 (83)	3.25 (83)	49.37 (1,257)
Source: https://w2.weather.gov/climate/

== Demographics ==
Historical population
Census	Pop.	Note	%±
1850	329		—
1870	415		—
1880	485		16.9%
1890	550		13.4%
1900	764		38.9%
1910	1,347		76.3%
1920	1,895		40.7%
1930	2,543		34.2%
1940	3,678		44.6%
1950	5,574		51.5%
1960	6,117		9.7%
1970	6,677		9.2%
1980	7,288		9.2%
1990	7,540		3.5%
2000	11,510		52.7%
2010	10,966		−4.7%
2020	11,292		3.0%
2025 (est.)	13,114	▲	16.1%
U.S. Decennial Census

=== 2020 census ===
As of the 2020 census, Smithfield had a population of 11,292. The median age was 41.9 years. 22.6% of residents were under the age of 18 and 21.9% were 65 years of age or older. For every 100 females, there were 89.5 males, and for every 100 females age 18 and over, there were 86.5 males age 18 and over.

96.3% of residents lived in urban areas, while 3.7% lived in rural areas.

There were 4,481 households and 2,919 families in Smithfield, of which 30.4% had children under the age of 18 living in them. Of all households, 35.4% were married-couple households, 20.0% were households with a male householder and no spouse or partner present, and 39.4% were households with a female householder and no spouse or partner present. About 33.2% of all households were made up of individuals and 17.2% had someone living alone who was 65 years of age or older.

There were 4,940 housing units, of which 9.3% were vacant. The homeowner vacancy rate was 2.5% and the rental vacancy rate was 6.0%.

Smithfield racial composition
Race	Number	Percentage
White (non-Hispanic)	5,011	44.38%
Black or African American (non-Hispanic)	3,101	27.46%
Native American	40	0.35%
Asian	105	0.93%
Pacific Islander	6	0.05%
Other/mixed	363	3.21%
Hispanic or Latino	2,666	23.61%

=== 2000 census ===
As of the census of 2000, 11,510 people, 4,417 households, and 2,676 families resided in the town. The population density was 1,007.6 inhabitants per square mile (389.0/km^{2}). The 4,674 housing units had an average density of 409.2 per square mile (158.0/km^{2}). The racial makeup of the town was 62.66% White, 30.99% African American, 0.43% Native American, 0.63% Asian, 4.16% from other races, and 1.13% from two or more races. Hispanics or Latinos of any race were 9.9% of the population.

Of the 4,417 households, 26.6% had children under 18 living with them, 42.1% were married couples living together, 14.9% had a female householder with no husband present, and 39.4% were not families. About 35.7% of all households were made up of individuals, and 16.3% had someone living alone who was 65 or older. The average household size was 2.30, and the average family size was 2.97.

In the town, the age distribution was 21.3% under the age of 18, 8.3% from 18 to 24, 29.2% from 25 to 44, 22.9% from 45 to 64, and 18.2% who were 65 or older. The median age was 39 years. For every 100 females, there were 99.4 males. For every 100 females 18 and over, there were 97.6 males. The median income for a household in the town was $27,813, and for a family was $37,929. Males had a median income of $29,567 versus $24,440 for females. The per capita income for the town was $18,012. About 14.5% of families and 20.6% of the population were below the poverty line, including 27.1% of those under 18 and 19.2% of those 65 or over.

== Government ==
Smithfield has a council–manager form of government. The council, the town's legislative body, consists of seven members and a mayor. The council sets policy, and the manager oversees day-to-day operations.

== Education ==
All of the county is in the Johnston County Schools school district.

- South Smithfield Elementary School
- West Smithfield Elementary School
- Smithfield Middle School
- The Innovation Academy at South Campus
- Johnston County Middle College High School
- Johnston County Early College Academy
- Smithfield-Selma High School

Other institutions:

- Neuse Charter School
- Johnston Community College

== Infrastructure ==
- UNC Health Care - Johnston Health

== Notable people ==
- Elreta Alexander-Ralston, judge and attorney
- Gary Clark, NBA player
- Nan Ogburn Cullman, singer, explorer, and philanthropist
- Harmeet Dhillon, lawyer and Republican Party official
- Barry Foote, former Major League Baseball catcher
- Ava Gardner, actress, born in Grabtown southeast of Smithfield, buried in Smithfield
- Shane Helms, professional wrestler
- Neal Lancaster, professional golfer
- Lu Long Ogburn Medlin, Miss North Carolina 1951
- Amber O'Neal, professional wrestler
- Edward W. Pou, U.S. congressman, 1901–1934
- William Cary Renfrow, third governor of Oklahoma Territory
- Jerry Sands, professional baseball player
- Ray Tanner, South Carolina Gamecocks athletic director and former head baseball coach
- John Townsend, author
- Curtis Whitley, NFL offensive lineman
- Jonathan Williams, professional football running back
- Miriam Carson Williams, banking executive

== See also ==
- List of municipalities in North Carolina
- National Register of Historic Places listings in Johnston County, North Carolina
