= Ava Lowery =

American activist and filmmaker

- Born: Evelyn Ingrid Lowrey; 1990 (age 35–36); Mississippi
- Known for: Peace Activism, Animations, 'WWJD'? , Documentary Filmmaker
- Website: http://www.peacetakescourage.com http://www.avalowrey.com

Ava Lowery is an American peace activist and documentary filmmaker from Alabama who has created over 100 Flash-based animations denouncing the Iraq War, former United States President George W. Bush, policies of the Republican Party and several individual Republican politicians. She has actively demonstrated against the war, and in support of soldiers.

Lowery is also the creator of the website Peace Takes Courage, and she and her work have received national media attention in 2005 and 2006, including interviews on Fox News. She is noted for her creation of an online animation, "WWJD" (which stands for "What Would Jesus Do?"). This flash-based animation displays photographs of wounded Iraqi children and suggests what we should do from a Christian angle over the song "Jesus Loves Me."

Peace activist Cindy Sheehan, founder of the Gold Star Families for Peace, has praised Lowery and her work and wrote an article in support of her "new friend... (who) is also against the war and the Bush regime." In July 2006 Lowery was awarded the BuzzFlash "Wings of Justice" award. She is also a person of interest in the blog world, and was a featured speaker at the 2006 YearlyKos Convention. Ms. Lowery's appearance of the 2006 Kos Convention was described by Adam Cohen of The New York Times, who noted that "it shows that a 15-year-old with video software and Internet access can now create and disseminate a professional-quality political ad."

Lowery conceived and organized the "16 Candles for Soldiers" event. This rally in support of the troops and against the war was held on the steps of the Alabama state capital in Montgomery on October 21, 2006.

Lowery and her activism were profiled at length in the 28 January 2007 edition of the Mobile Press-Register.

In 2009 she completed a feature-length documentary profiling three veterans of the war in Iraq titled FALLOUT: Coming Home from the War in Iraq. In 2013 she won Best Documentary Pitch and Best Doc in the Works at Fusion Film Festival in New York City for her short documentary film Fred: The Town Dog.

Lowery was a homeschooled student from grades 7 through 12. She graduated from New York University's Tisch School of the Arts with a degree in Film & Television and sociology in May 2013. She received a masters at Duke University.
