= List of schools in Gastonia, North Carolina =

This is a list of schools in Gaston County, North Carolina, United States.

== Public schools ==
=== High schools (9-12) ===
- Ashbrook High School, Gastonia
- Bessemer City High School, Bessemer City
- Cherryville High School, Cherryville
- East Gaston High School, Mount Holly
- Forestview High School, Gastonia
- Highland School of Technology, Gastonia (magnet)
- Hunter Huss High School, Gastonia
- Gaston Early College High School, Dallas (magnet)
- Gaston Early College of Medical Sciences High School, Dallas
- North Gaston High School, Dallas
- South Point High School, Belmont
- Stuart W. Cramer High School, Belmont

=== Middle schools (6-8) ===
- Belmont Middle School, Belmont
- Bessemer City Middle School, Bessemer City
- Cramerton Middle School, Cramerton
- Holbrook Middle School, Lowell
- John Chavis Middle School, Cherryville
- Mount Holly Middle School, Mount Holly
- Southwest Middle School, Gastonia
- Stanley Middle School, Stanley
- W. C. Friday Middle School, Dallas
- W. P. Grier Middle School, Gastonia
- York Chester Middle School, Gastonia

=== Elementary schools ===
- Belmont Central School
- Bessemer City Central Elementary School
- Bessemer City Primary School
- Brookside Elementary School
- Carr Elementary School
- Catawba Heights Elementary School
- Chapel Grove Elementary School
- Cherryville Elementary School
- Costner Elementary School
- Dr. Edward D. Sadler Elementary School
- Forest Heights Elementary School
- Gardner Park Elementary School
- H. H. Beam Elementary School
- Hawks Nest Intermediate School
- Kiser Elementary School
- Lingerfeldt Elementary School
- Lowell Elementary School
- McAdenville Elementary School
- New Hope Elementary School
- North Belmont Elementary School
- Page Primary School
- Pinewood Elementary School
- Pleasant Ridge Elementary School
- Rankin Elementary School
- Rhyne Elementary School
- Robinson Elementary School
- Sherwood Elementary School
- Springfield Primary School
- Tryon Elementary School
- W. A. Bess Elementary School
- W. B. Beam Intermediate School
- Woodhill Elementary School

=== Alternative schools ===
- Warlick Alternative School (behavioral)
- Webb St. School (disabilities)

== Charter schools ==
- Piedmont Community Charter School

== Private schools ==
- Gaston Day School (prek-12th grade)
- St. Michael Catholic School (prek-8th grade)
