= North Carolina High School Athletic Association =

Sports governing organization

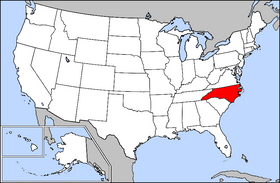
- Abbreviation: NCHSAA
- Formation: 1913
- Legal status: Association
- Purpose: Athletic/Educational
- Headquarters: 222 Finley Golf Course Rd. Chapel Hill, North Carolina 27515
- Region served: North Carolina
- Affiliations: National Federation of State High School Associations
- Website: nchsaa.org

The North Carolina High School Athletic Association (NCHSAA) is the governing organization of high school athletics in the U.S. state of North Carolina. The association maintains the official rule books and governs the officiating standards across the state.

The NCHSAA organizes member schools into conferences and oversees the state championships for each of the sanctioned sports. The NCHSAA headquarters is located at 222 Finley Golf Course Road, in Chapel Hill, North Carolina. The mailing address for the NCHSAA is PO Box 3216, Chapel Hill, North Carolina 27515.

== History ==
The NCHSAA was founded in 1913 by Dr. Louis Round Wilson (1876–1979), a professor at the University of North Carolina at Chapel Hill. The university served as the primary source of funding and leadership for the Association from 1913 through 1947, before the organization adopted its current model, which provides school administrators with direct influence through the presence of the NCHSAA Board of Directors. The NCHSAA remained affiliated with UNC-Chapel Hill until 2010, when it became an independent organization.

The first state championships were held in the NCHSAA's inaugural year of 1913, in both track and football. Baseball (1914), basketball (1915), and tennis (1916) were added over the next three athletic seasons. The NCHSAA would continue to sanction a variety of different sports throughout its history, including soccer (1927), wrestling (1931), golf (1937), swimming (1950), cross country (1956), softball (1975), volleyball (1976), indoor track (1987), and lacrosse (2010). The Girls' Advisory Committee was formed in 1968 and oversaw the girl's athletic program.

Article Four of the NCHSAA bylaws explicitly limits membership to "North Carolina public or non-boarding parochial high schools", and as such the only current non-public or charter high school members of the NCHSAA are four Catholic schools: Raleigh Cardinal Gibbons, Charlotte Catholic, Bishop McGuinness, and Christ the King. A fifth Catholic school, John Paul II in Greenville, will join the NCHSAA in 2027. Most private/independent schools within North Carolina are members of the North Carolina Independent Schools Athletic Association (NCISAA). While the NCISAA administers its own championships, it is not uncommon for NCHSAA schools to compete against NCISAA schools in regular competition.

== Classifications ==
=== Early years ===
High schools within the NCHSAA were first organized into classifications in 1929, based by the size of the student population. Prior to 1929, all schools played in a single "open" format and postseason play was decided within "east" and "west" regions by meetings of school administrators. The east versus west postseason approach continues to this day. In larger classes especially this format ensures matchups between schools from the state's major cities do not occur until later rounds; generally, schools from the Triangle and Wilmington are seeded in the eastern half of the bracket, while schools from the Piedmont Triad cities, greater Charlotte, and Asheville play in the western region. In 1929, the NCHSAA first split schools into "Class A" and "Class B", with Class A consisting of schools with a larger student population. Several other changes occurred to NCHSAA classifications between 1929 and 1958, which eventually went to three classifications.

Due to segregation, the NCHSAA was initially reserved for whites-only high schools. Historically black high schools competed in the North Carolina High School Athletics Conference (NCHSAC) and would start to merge into the NCHSAA in 1967. The Robeson Indian High School Athletic Conference (RIHSAC), which primarily served schools reserved for Lumbee students, was another interscholastic league that competed in various sports. In 1966, the RIHSAC became known as the Tri-County Indian High School Athletic Conference (TCIHSAC). The TCISAC schools would join the NCHSAA in 1968.

In 1929, in the Piedmont and Western Foothills region of the state, 15 charter member high schools formed the Western North Carolina High School Activities Association (WNCHSAA). This association grew to as many as 42 high schools and four different conferences. The WNCHSAA schools would merge into the NCHSAA in 1977. The NCHSAA includes results (where available) of the NCHSAC, RIHSAC, TCIHSAC, and WNCHSAA championships as part of its record books and officially acknowledges the role each predecessor organization played in supporting interscholastic athletics in the state.

=== 1A, 2A, 3A, 4A era (1959–2025) ===
In 1959, due to growth and consolidation of North Carolina high schools, member schools were split into four classifications, identified by 1A, 2A, 3A, and 4A. The states 4A class were made up of the largest high schools, and 1A the smallest. For over 65 years, these four classes remained as the only classification sizes of NCHSAA member high schools, outside of football subdividing the four classes from 2002–2021, and lasted through the 2024–25 school year.

Prior to 1993, a set minimum enrollment number determined each school's classification. Beginning in 1993, schools were split so that approximately 25% of member schools were in each of the states four classifications. A new approach was instituted in 2017, known as the 20-30-30-20 model, with the largest 20% of high schools in 4A and the smallest 20% in 1A. The middle 60% was split between 2A and 3A. This model received considerable criticism for the unbalanced classes and the NCHSAA moved back to the 25-25-25-25 model in 2021.

The different NCHSAA sanctioned sports would hold separate state championship competitions and titles for each of the 1A, 2A, 3A and 4A classifications. The only exceptions were times where a sanctioned sport state championship was only a single class, instances of 1A and 2A being jointly combined, and in some instances 1A, 2A, and 3A were jointly combined.

=== Football adds subdivisions for each classification (2002–2021) ===
In football only, starting in 2002, each of the four NCHSAA classifications were separated into single "A" and double "AA". The double "AA" schools in each class were made up of larger schools than the single "A". Classes were 1A, 1AA, 2A, 2AA, 3A, 3AA, 4A and 4AA for football only. This single "A" and double "AA" format lasted until the fall of 2021, when the NCHSAA went back to football being only 1A, 2A, 3A, and 4A class sizes.

=== NCHSAA expands to eight classifications ===
Beginning in the 2025–26 school year, the NCHSAA classifications expanded from four to eight (1A to 8A). Before the change to the eight class system, the four class system (1A to 4A) had grown to the point where more than 100 schools were in each classification.

In the new eight class system, the NCHSAA bylaws limited the total number of high schools in each classification to 64. The NCHSAA opted for the "Big 32" model for the schools that would comprise class 8A, with the 32 largest high schools based on average daily membership forming the state's highest class. The 1A through 7A classifications were evenly divided, with around 60 schools in each class. This allows there to be room for future growth of NCHSAA member schools.

As before, state championships will be held in each classification for most sports. Exceptions remain where some classes jointly combine into a single tournament due to lower numbers of schools in those classes sponsoring a particular sport (examples of this include women's golf and men's tennis, where classes 1A-2A have a joint championship, and lacrosse, which runs a championship for 1A-6A jointly combined).

== Sanctioned sports ==
The North Carolina High School Athletic Association (NCHSAA) sanctions the following sports:

- Baseball
- Basketball
- Cheerleading
- Cross Country
- Flag football (girls' competition only)
- Football
- Golf
- Lacrosse
- Soccer
- Softball
- Swimming
- Tennis
- Track and Field
- Volleyball (boys' and girls' competitions)
- Wrestling

Many North Carolina schools, particularly in larger metropolitan areas, have programs in field hockey, beach volleyball, and gymnastics. These sports are currently not sanctioned by the NCHSAA.

== Championship Sites ==
The following venues will be used for championships during the 2026–27 school year:

- Football: Kenan Stadium, Chapel Hill; Barker–Lane Stadium, Buies Creek; and Moretz Stadium, Hickory
- Flag Football: Moretz Stadium, Hickory
- Boys' Soccer: Durham County Memorial Stadium, Durham
- Girls' Volleyball: John W. Pope Jr. Convocation Center, Buies Creek
- Cross-Country: Redmon Sports Complex, Kernersville
- Cheerleading: Cabarrus Arena, Concord
- Basketball: TBA
- Wrestling: TBA
- Indoor Track: JDL Fast Track, Winston-Salem
- Swimming: TBA
- Lacrosse: TBA
- Girls' Soccer: TBA
- Boys' Volleyball: TBA
- Baseball: TBA
- Softball: TBA
- Outdoor Track: TBA

Tennis and golf championships are held at multiple facilities around the state, with two classes of a similar size usually grouped at one particular venue.

== Conferences ==
These are the conference alignments starting with the 2025–26 school year. With minor adjustments to accommodate new schools, these alignments will remain through the 2028–29 school year.

=== 8A ===
CAP

Schools located in Johnston and Wake counties

- Athens Drive High School, "Jaguars" (8A)
- Enloe High School, "Eagles" (8A)
- Corinth Holders High School, "Pirates" (8A)
- Leesville Road High School, "Pride" (8A)
- Millbrook High School, "Wildcats" (8A)
- Needham B. Broughton High School, "Capitals" (8A)
- Rolesville High School, "Rams" (8A)
- Wakefield High School, "Wolverines" (8A)

Quad City Seven

Schools located in Durham and Wake Counties

- Apex High School, "Cougars" (8A)
- Apex Friendship High School, "Patriots" (8A)
- Charles E. Jordan High School, "Falcons" (8A)
- Green Hope High School, "Falcons" (8A)
- Green Level High School, "Gators" (8A)
- Panther Creek High School, "Catamounts" (8A)
- Willow Spring High School, "Storm" (8A)

=== 7A/8A ===
Central Piedmont

Schools located in Forsyth County and northwest Guilford County

- East Forsyth High School, "Eagles" (7A)
- Northwest Guilford High School, "Vikings" (8A)
- Parkland Magnet High School, "Mustangs" (7A)
- Ronald W. Reagan High School, "Raiders" (7A)
- Richard J. Reynolds High School, "Demons" (7A)
- West Forsyth High School, "Titans" (8A)

Greater Charlotte

Schools located in Mecklenburg County

- Garinger High School, "Wildcats" (8A)
- Hopewell High School, "Titans" (7A)
- Myers Park High School, "Mustangs" (8A)
- South Mecklenburg High School, "Sabres" (8A)
- West Mecklenburg High School, "Hawks" (7A)
- William A. Hough High School, "Huskies" (8A)

Meck Power Six

Schools located in Mecklenburg County

- David W. Butler High School, "Bulldogs" (7A)
- Independence High School, "Patriots" (7A)
- Julius L. Chambers High School, "Cougars" (8A)
- Mallard Creek High School, "Mavericks" (8A)
- North Mecklenburg High School, "Vikings" (7A)
- West Charlotte High School, "Lions" (8A)

Mid-South

Schools located in the Sandhills region of the state

- Hoke County High School, "Bucks" (8A)
- Jack Britt High School, "Buccaneers" (7A)
- Overhills High School, "Jaguars" (7A)
- Pinecrest High School, "Patriots" (8A)
- Pine Forest High School, "Trojans" (7A)
- Richmond Senior High School, "Raiders" (7A)

Southwestern

Schools located in Charlotte

- Ardrey Kell High School, "Knights" (8A)
- Ballantyne Ridge High School, "Wolves" (7A)
- East Mecklenburg High School, "Eagles" (8A)
- Palisades High School, "Pumas" (8A)
- Providence High School, "Panthers" (8A)
- Rocky River High School, "Ravens" (7A)

=== 7A ===
Greater Neuse River

Schools located southern Wake County and northern Johnston County

- Clayton High School, "Comets" (7A)
- Cleveland High School, "Rams" (7A)
- Fuquay-Varina High School, "Bengals" (7A)
- Garner Magnet High School, "Trojans" (7A)
- Smithfield-Selma High School, "Spartans" (7A)
- South Garner High School, "Titans" (7A)
- Southeast Raleigh High School, "Bulldogs" (7A)

=== 6A/7A/8A ===
Carolina Coast

Schools located in the southeastern corner of the state

- Emsley A. Laney High School, "Buccaneers" (8A)
- Eugene Ashley High School, "Screaming Eagles" (7A)
- John T. Hoggard High School, "Vikings" (8A)
- New Hanover High School, "Wildcats" (7A)
- Topsail High School, "Pirates" (7A)
- North Brunswick High School, "Scorpions" (7A)
- West Brunswick High School, "Trojans" (6A)

=== 6A/7A ===
Big Carolina

Schools located in the central-eastern part of the state

- D. H. Conley High School, "Vikings" (7A)
- JH Rose High School, "Rampants" (6A)
- Jacksonville High School, "Cardinals" (6A)
- New Bern High School, "Bears" (7A)
- South Central High School, "Falcons" (7A)
- White Oak High School, "Vikings" (6A)

Greater Metro (GMAC)

Schools located in Cabarrus County and west Charlotte

- A. L. Brown High School, "Wonders" (7A)
- Central Cabarrus High School, "Vikings" (6A)
- Cox Mill High School, "Chargers" (7A)
- Harding University High School, "Rams" (6A)
- Hickory Ridge High School, "Ragin' Bulls" (7A)
- Olympic High School, "Trojans" (6A)
- Phillip O. Berry Academy of Technology, "Cardinals" (6A)
- West Cabarrus High School, "Timberwolves" (7A)

Metro

Schools located in Guilford County

- Ben L. Smith High School, "Golden Eagles" (6A)
- Grimsley High School, "Whirlies" (7A)
- James B. Dudley High School, "Panthers" (6A)
- Ragsdale High School, "Flying Tigers" (6A)
- Southwest Guilford High School, "Cowboys" (boys), "Cowgirls" (girls) (7A)
- Walter Hines Page Senior High School, "Pirates" (7A)
- Western Guilford High School, "Hornets" (6A)

North Piedmont

Schools located in Davie and Iredell counties

- Davie County High School, "War Eagles" (7A)
- Lake Norman High School, "Wildcats" (7A)
- Mooresville High School, "Blue Devils" (7A)
- North Iredell High School, "Raiders" (6A)
- South Iredell High School, "Vikings" (7A)
- Statesville High School, "Greyhounds" (6A)

Northern Six

Schools located in Franklin, Vance, and Wake counties

- East Wake High School, "Warriors" (7A)
- Franklinton High School, "Red Rams" (6A)
- Heritage High School, "Huskies" (7A)
- Knightdale High School, "Knights" (7A)
- Vance County High School, "Vipers" (6A)
- Wake Forest High School, "Cougars" (7A)

Northwestern

Schools located in the foothills and high country areas of the western part of state.

- Alexander Central High School, "Cougars" (6A)
- Freedom High School, "Patriots" (6A)
- McDowell High School, "Titans" (7A)
- South Caldwell High School, "Spartans" (6A)
- St. Stephens High School, "Indians" (6A)
- Watauga High School, "Pioneers" (6A)

Southern Carolina

Schools located in Union County and Charlotte

- Charlotte Catholic High School, "Cougars" (6A)
- Cuthbertson High School, "Cavaliers" (7A)
- Marvin Ridge High School, "Mavericks" (7A)
- Piedmont High School, "Panthers" (6A)
- Porter Ridge High School, "Pirates" (7A)
- Sun Valley High School, "Spartans" (6A)
- Weddington High School, "Warriors" (7A)

Tri-County

Schools located in Cumberland, Robeson and Scotland counties.

- Cape Fear High School, "Colts" (7A)
- Gray's Creek High School, "Bears" (6A)
- Lumberton High School, "Pirates" (7A)
- Purnell Swett High School, "Rams" (7A)
- Scotland High School, "Scots" (6A)
- Terry Sanford High School, "Bulldogs" (6A)

Triangle Six

Schools located in Wake County

- Cardinal Gibbons High School, "Crusaders" (7A)
- Cary High School, "Imps" (7A)
- Felton Grove High School, "Galaxy" (6A)
- Holly Springs High School, "Golden Hawks" (7A)
- Middle Creek High School, "Mustangs" (6A)
- Sanderson High School, "Spartans" (7A)

Tobacco Road

Schools located in Durham County and Chapel-Hill

- Chapel Hill High School, "Tigers" (7A)
- East Chapel Hill High School, "Wildcats" (6A)
- Hillside High School, "Hornets" (7A)
- Northern High School, "Knights" (boys), "Ladies" (girls) (6A)
- Riverside High School (Durham), "Pirates" (7A)
- Southern School of Energy and Sustainability "Spartans" (7A)

=== 6A ===
Carolina Pines

Schools located in Harnett, Johnston, Lee, and Moore county

- Harnett Central High School, "Trojans" (6A)
- Lee County High School, "Yellow Jackets" (6A)
- South Johnston High School, "Trojans" (6A)
- Southern Lee High School, "Cavaliers" (6A)
- Triton High School, "Hawks" (6A)
- Union Pines High School, "Vikings" (6A)
- Western Harnett High School, "Eagles" (6A)
- West Johnston High School, "Wildcats" (6A)

=== 5A/6A ===
Big East

Schools located in Nash, Wayne and Wilson counties

- Charles B. Aycock High School, "Golden Falcons" (5A)
- Ralph L. Fike High School, "Demons" (5A)
- James B. Hunt Jr. High School, "Warriors" (5A)
- Northern Nash High School, "Knights" (6A)
- Rocky Mount High School, "Gryphons" (5A)
- Southern Nash High School, "Firebirds" (5A)
- Southern Wayne High School, "Saints" (5A)

Big South

Schools located in Cleveland and Gaston counties

- Ashbrook High School, "Green Wave" (6A)
- Crest High School, "Chargers" (5A)
- Forestview High School, "Jaguars" (5A)
- Hunter Huss High School, "Huskies" (5A)
- Kings Mountain High School, "Mountaineers" (6A)
- North Gaston High School, "Wildcats" (5A)
- South Point High School, "Red Raiders" (5A)

Coastal

Schools located along the southeastern coast of the state

- Croatan High School, "Cougars" (5A)
- Dixon High School, "Bulldogs" (5A)
- Havelock High School, "Rams" (5A)
- Northside High School (Jacksonville), "Monarchs" (5A)
- Richlands High School, "Wildcats" (5A)
- Swannsboro High School, "Pirates" (6A)
- West Carteret High School, "Patriots" (5A)

Eastern Sandhills

Schools located in the Fayetteville and the surrounding areas

- Douglas Byrd High School, "Eagles" (5A)
- E. E. Smith High School, "Golden Bulls" (6A)
- Seventy-First High School, "Falcons" (6A)
- South View High School, "Tigers" (6A)
- St. Pauls High School, "Bulldogs" (5A)
- Westover High School, "Wolverines" (6A)

Mountain

Schools located in Asheville and surrounding communities

- A. C. Reynolds High School, "Rockets" (6A)
- Asheville High School, "Cougars" (6A)
- Clyde A. Erwin High School, "Warriors" (5A)
- Enka High School, "Jets" (5A)
- North Buncombe High School, "Black Hawks" (5A)
- T. C. Roberson High School, "Rams" (6A)

Piedmont Triad

Schools located in Forsyth County and northern Davidson County

- Mount Tabor High School, "Spartans" (6A)
- North Davidson High School, "Black Knights" (5A)
- North Forsyth High School, "Vikings" (5A)
- Oak Grove High School, "Grizzlies" (5A)
- Robert B. Glenn High School, "Bobcats" (6A)
- Simon G. Atkins Academic & Technology High School, "Camels" (5A)

TAAC 6

Schools located in Guilford County and Asheboro

- Asheboro High School, "Blue Comets" (6A)
- Eastern Guilford High School, "Wildcats" (6A)
- Northeast Guilford High School, "Rams" (5A)
- Northern Guilford High School, "Nighthawks" (6A)
- Southeast Guilford High School, "Falcons" (6A)
- Southern Guilford High School, "Storm" (5A)

=== 4A/5A/6A ===
Mid-Carolina

Schools located in Alamance and Person counties

- Eastern Alamance High School, "Eagles" (5A)
- Graham High School, "Red Devils" (4A)
- Hugh M. Cummings High School, "Cavaliers" (4A)
- Person High School, "Rockets" (5A)
- Southeast Alamance High School, "Stallions" (5A)
- Southern Alamance High School, "Patriots" (6A)
- Walter M. Williams High School, "Bulldogs (5A)
- Western Alamance High School, "Warriors" (6A)

=== 4A/5A ===
Big Seven

Schools located in Chatham, Durham, and Orange counties

- Carrboro High School, "Jaguars" (4A)
- Cedar Ridge High School, "Red Wolves" (5A)
- Durham School of the Arts, "Bulldogs" (5A)
- J.F. Webb High School, "Warriors" (5A)
- Orange High School, "Panthers" (5A)
- Seaforth High School, "Hawks" (5A)
- South Granville High School, "Vikings" (5A)

Mountain Eight

Schools located in the southwestern part of the state

- Brevard High School, "Blue Devils" (4A)
- East Henderson High School, "Eagles" (4A)
- Franklin High School, "Panthers" (5A)
- North Henderson High School, "Knights" (5A)
- Pisgah High School, "Black Bears" (4A)
- Smoky Mountain High School, "Mustangs" (5A)
- Tuscola High School, "Mountaineer" (4A)
- West Henderson High School, "Falcons" (5A)

PAC Seven

Schools located in the western central part of the state

- Central Davidson High School, "Spartans" (4A)
- High Point Central High School, "Bison" (5A)
- Ledford Senior High School, "Panthers" (4A)
- Lexington Senior High School, "Yellow Jackets" (4A)
- Montgomery Central High School, "Wolverines" (5A)
- Randleman High School, "Tigers" (4A)
- T. Wingate Andrews High School, "Red Raiders" (4A)

Rocky River

Schools in the south-central portion of the state

- Central Academy of Technology and Arts, "Cougars" (4A)
- Parkwood High School, "Wolfpack" (5A)
- Anson High School, "Bearcats" (4A)
- Forest Hills High School, "Yellow Jackets" (5A)
- Mount Pleasant High School, "Tigers" (4A)
- Monroe High School, "Redhawks" (5A)
- West Stanly High School, "Colts" (4A)

South Piedmont

Schools located in Cabarrus and Rowan counties

- Jesse C. Carson High School, "Cougars" (5A)
- Concord High School, "Spiders" (5A)
- East Rowan High School, "Mustangs" (5A)
- Jay M. Robinson High School, "Bulldogs" (5A)
- Northwest Cabarrus High School, "Trojans" (5A)
- Salisbury High School, "Hornets" (4A)
- South Rowan High School, "Raiders" (4A)
- West Rowan High School, "Falcons" (5A)

Western Foothills

Schools located in Catawba, Iredell, and Lincoln counties

- Bandys High School, "Trojans" (4A)
- Bunker Hill High School, "Bears" (4A)
- East Lincoln High School, "Mustangs" (5A)
- Fred T. Foard High School, "Tigers" (4A)
- Hickory High School, "Red Tornadoes" (5A)
- Maiden High School, "Blue Devils" (4A)
- Newton-Conover High School, "Red Devils" (4A)
- North Lincoln High School, "Knights" (5A)
- West Iredell High School, "Warriors" (4A)

=== 4A ===
Three Rivers

Schools located in Beaufort, Craven, Edgecombie, Johnston, Lenoir, Pitt, and Wayne counties

- Eastern Wayne High School, "Warriors" (4A)
- North Lenoir High School, "Hawks" (4A)
- North Johnston High School, "Panthers" (4A)
- North Pitt High School, "Panthers" (4A)
- Southwest Edgecombe High School, "Cougars" (4A)
- Washington High School, "Pam Pack" (4A)
- West Craven High School, "Eagles" (4A)

=== 3A/4A/5A ===
Mid State

Schools located in Caswell, Forsyth, and Rockingham counties

- Bartlett Yancey High School, "Buccaneers" (3A)
- Carver High School, "Yellow Jackets" (4A)
- Dalton L. McMichael High School, "Phoenix" (3A)
- John Motley Morehead High School, "Panthers" (4A)
- Reidsville High School, "Rams" (4A)
- Rockingham County High School, "Cougars" (5A)
- Walkertown High School, "Wolfpack" (3A)

Northeastern Coastal

Schools located in the northeastern corner of the state

- Currituck County High School, "Knights" (5A)
- First Flight High School, "Nighthawks", (4A)
- Hertford County High School, "Bears" (3A)
- Martin County High School, Gators (3A)
- Northeastern High School, "Eagles" (3A)
- Pasquotank County High School, "Panthers" (3A)

Southeastern

Schools located in the southeastern part of the state

- Fairmont High School, "Golden Tornadoes" (4A)
- Red Springs High School, "Red Devils" (4A)
- South Brunswick High School, "Cougars" (5A)
- South Columbus High School, "Stallions" (3A)
- West Bladen High School, "Knights" (3A)
- Whiteville High School, "Wolfpack" (3A)

=== 3A/4A ===
East Central

Schools located in Duplin, Lenoir, Onslow, Pender, and Sampson counties

- Clinton High School, "Dark Horses" (4A)
- East Duplin High School, "Panthers" (4A)
- Heide Trask High School, "Titans" (3A)
- Pender High School, "Patriots" (3A)
- South Lenoir High School, "Blue Devils" (3A)
- Southwest Onslow High School, "Stallions" (4A)

Four Rivers

Schools located in the eastern central part of the state

- Eastern Randolph High School, "Wildcats" (3A)
- Jordan-Matthews High School, "Jets" (3A)
- North Moore High School, Mustangs" (3A)
- Northwood High School, "Chargers" (3A)
- Southwestern Randolph High School, "Cougars" (4A)
- Uwharrie Charter Academy, "Eagles" (4A)

Northwest

Schools are located in Stokes, Surry and Yadkin counties

- East Surry High School, "Cardinals" (3A)
- Forbush High School, "Falcons" (4A)
- Mount Airy High School, "Granite Bears" (3A)
- North Surry High School, "Greyhounds" (4A)
- Surry Central High School, "Golden Eagles" (3A)
- West Stokes High School, "Wildcats" (4A)

Western Piedmont

Schools located in Burke, Caldwell, and Rutherford counties

- Chase High School, "Trojans" (3A)
- East Rutherford High School, "Cavaliers" (3A)
- Robert L. Patton High School, "Panthers" (3A)
- East Burke High School, "Cavaliers" (4A)
- Hibriten High School, "Panthers" (4A)
- Jimmy C. Draughn High School, "Wildcats" (3A)
- Rutherfordton-Spindale Central High School, "Hilltoppers" (4A)
- West Caldwell High School, "Warriors" (3A)

=== 3A ===
Central Carolina

Schools located in Davidson and Randolph counties

- East Davidson High School, "Golden Eagles" (3A)
- Providence Grove High School, "Patriots" (3A)
- Thomasville High School, "Bulldogs" (3A)
- Trinity High School, "Bulldogs" (3A)
- Wheatmore High School, "Warriors" (3A)
- West Davidson High School, "Dragons" (3A)

=== 2A/3A/4A ===
Catawba Shores

Schools located in Iredell, Lincoln, and Mecklenburg counties

- Bradford Prep High School, "Bears" (2A)
- Christ The King Catholic High School, "Crusaders" (2A)
- Community School of Davidson, "Spartans" (2A)
- Corvian Community School, "Cardinals" (2A)
- Langtree Charter Academy, "Lions" (2A)
- Lake Norman Charter School, "Knights" (4A)
- Lincoln Charter School, "Eagles" (4A)
- Pine Lake Preparatory, "Pride" (3A)

Mountain Valley

Schools located in the northwestern corner of the state

- Alleghany High School, "Trojans" (2A)
- Ashe County High School, "Huskies" (4A)
- East Wilkes High School, "Cardinals" (2A)
- Elkin High School, "Elks" (2A)
- North Wilkes High School, "Vikings" (3A)
- Starmount High School, "Rams" (2A)
- West Wilkes High School, "Blackhawks" (3A)
- Wilkes Central High School, "Eagles" (4A)

Southern Piedmont

Schools located in Cleveland, Gaston, and Lincoln counties

- Burns High School, "Bulldogs" (4A)
- East Gaston High School, "Warriors" (4A)
- Shelby High School, "Golden Lions" (3A)
- Bessemer City High School, "Yellow Jackets" (3A)
- Cherryville High School, "Ironmen" (2A)
- Lincolnton High School, "Wolves" (3A)
- Highland School of Technology, "Rams" (2A)
- Stuart W. Cramer High School, "Storm" (4A)
- West Lincoln High School, "Rebels" (3A)

Quad County

Schools located in Franklin, Hailfax, Johnston, Nash, and Wake counties

- American Leadership Academy Johnston, "Patriots" (2A)
- Bunn High School, "Wildcats" (4A)
- Louisburg High School, "Warriors" (3A)
- Nash Central High School, "Bulldogs" (4A)
- Roanoke Rapids High School, "Yellow Jackets" (4A)
- Wake Preparatory Academy, "Guardians" (3A)

=== 2A/3A ===
Eastern Pines

Schools located in the eastern part of the state

- Ayden-Grifton High School, "Chargers" (3A)
- Beddingfield High School, "Bruins" (3A)
- Farmville Central High School, "Jaguars" (3A)
- Greene Central High School, "Rams" (3A)
- Kinston High School, "Vikings" (3A)
- Tarboro High School, "Vikings" (2A)

Swine Valley

Schools located in Duplin, Edgecombie, Johnston, Sampson, and Wayne Counties

- Goldsboro High School, "Cougars" (2A)
- James Kenan High School, "Tigers" (2A)
- Midway High School, "Raiders" (3A)
- Princeton High School, "Bulldogs" (3A)
- Rosewood High School, "Eagles" (2A)
- Spring Creek High School, "Gators" (3A)
- Wallace-Rose Hill High School, "Bulldogs" (3A)

Western Highlands

Schools located in the western part of the state

- Avery County High School, "Vikings" (2A)
- Charles D. Owen High School, "Warhorses" (3A)
- Hendersonville High School, "Bearcats" (3A)
- Madison High School, "Patriots" (3A)
- Mitchell High School, "Mountaineers" (2A)
- Mountain Heritage High School, "Cougars" (3A)
- Polk County High School, "Wolverines" (3A)

Yadkin Valley

Schools located along the Yadkin River in the northwest

- Albemarle High School, "Bulldogs" (2A)*football only
- Gray Stone Day School, "Knights" (2A)
- North Rowan High School, "Cavaliers" (2A)*football only
- North Stanly High School, "Comets" (3A)*football only
- South Stanly High School, "Rebels" (2A)*football only
- Union Academy, "Cardinals" (3A)*football only

=== 2A ===
Albemarle

Schools located along the Albemarle Sound

- Bertie High School, "Falcons" (2A)
- Camden County High School, "Bruins" (2A)
- Gates County Senior High School, "Red Barons" (2A)
- John A. Holmes High School, "Aces" (2A)
- Manteo High School, "Redskins" (2A)
- Perquimans County High School, "Pirates" (2A)

=== 1A/2A/3A ===
Catawba River

Schools located in Cabarrus, Cleveland, Gaston, and Mecklenburg counties

- Bonnie Cone Leadership Academy (1A)*football only
- Carolina International School, "Comets" (1A)
- Jackson Day School, "Mariners" (1A)
- Mountain Island Charter School, "Raptors" (2A)*football only
- North Carolina School of Science and Mathematics–Morganton "Dragons" (1A)
- Piedmont Communuity Charter School, "Patriots" (3A)
- Queen's Grant High School, "Stallions" (2A)
- Sugar Creek Charter School, "Wildcats" (2A)
- Thomas Jefferson Classical Academy, "Gryphons" (1A)*football only

Diamond Nine

Schools located in Durham, Person, and Wake counties

- East Wake Academy, "Eagles" (2A)
- Franklin Academy, "Patriots" (2A)
- Neuse Charter School, "Cougars" (1A)
- North Carolina School of Science and Mathematics–Durham, "Unicorns" (3A)
- Raleigh Charter High School, "Phoenix" (2A)
- Research Triangle High School, "Raptors" (2A)
- Roxboro Community School, "Bulldogs" (2A)
- Triangle Math and Science Academy, "Tigers" (3A)
- Voyager Academy, "Vikings" (2A)

=== 1A/2A ===
Carolina

Schools located in Bladen, Columbus, Dublin, Sampson counties

- East Bladen High School, "Eagles" (2A)
- East Columbus High School, "Gators" (1A)
- Hobbton High School, "Wildcats" (2A)
- Lakewood High School, "Leopards" (2A)
- North Duplin High School, "Rebels" (2A)
- Union High School, "Spartans" (2A)
- West Columbus High School, "Vikings" (2A)

Coastal Plains

Schools located along North Carolina's central coast

- East Carteret High School, "Mariners" (2A)
- Jones Senior High School, "Trojans" (1A)
- Northside High School (Pinetown), "Panthers" (1A)
- Lejeune High School, "Devilpups" (2A)
- Pamlico County High School, "Hurricanes" (2A)
- Southside High School, "Seahawks" (2A)

Greater Triad

Schools located in Chatham, Davidson, Forsyth, Guilford, and Stokes counties

- Bishop McGuinness High School, "Villains" (2A)
- Chatham Central High School, "Bears" (1A)
- The College Prep and Leadership Academy, "Royals" (1A)
- North Stokes High School, "Vikings" (1A)
- South Davidson Middle and High School, "Wildcats" (1A)
- South Stokes High School, "Sauras" (2A)
- Winston-Salem Preparatory Academy, "Phoenix" (1A)

Northwest Triad

Schools located in the Triad region

- Bethany Community School, "Wolves" (1A)
- Cornerstone Charter Academy, "Cardinals" (2A)
- Millennium Charter Academy, "Lions" (1A)
- North Carolina Leadership Academy, "Falcons" (1A)
- Piedmont Classical High School, "Bobcats" (2A)
- Phoenix Academy, "Firebirds" (1A)
- Triad Math & Science Academy, "Bengals" (1A)

Roanoke River

Schools located along the Roanoke River

- KIPP Pride High School, "Panthers" (1A)
- Northampton County High School, "Jaguars" (2A)
- Northwest Halifax High School, "Vikings" (2A)
- Southeast Collegiate Prep Academy "Trojans" (1A)
- Warren County High School, "Eagles" (2A)
- Weldon High School, "Chargers" (1A)

Smoky Mountain

Schools located in and around the Smoky Mountains

- Andrews High School, "Wildcats" (1A)
- Blue Ridge School, "Bobcats" (1A)
- Cherokee High School, "Braves" (2A)
- Hayesville High School, "Yellow Jackets" (2A)
- Highlands School, "Highlanders" (1A)
- Hiwassee Dam High School, "Eagles" (1A)
- Murphy High School, "Bulldogs" (2A)
- Nantahala School, "Hawks" (1A)
- Robbinsville High School, "Black Knights" (1A)
- Rosman High School, "Tigers" (1A)
- Summit Charter School, "Bears" (1A)
- Swain County High School, "Maroon Devils" (2A)
- Tri-County Early College, "Jaguars" (1A)

Triangle North

Schools located in the northern Triangle region

- Discovery Charter, "Trailblazers" (1A)
- Eno River Academy, "Bobcats" (2A)
- Excelsior Classical Academy, "Flying Lions" (1A)
- Falls Lake Academy, "Firebirds" (1A)
- Henderson Collegiate School, "Lions" (2A)
- Oxford Preparatory School, "Griffins" (1A)
- Vance Charter School, "Knights" (1A)

=== 1A ===
Atlantic 5

Schools located in the Outer Banks region

- Bear Grass Charter School, "Bears" (1A)
- Cape Hatteras Secondary School, "Hurricanes" (1A)
- Columbia High School, "Wildcats" (1A)
- Hobgood Charter School, "Raiders" (1A)
- Mattamuskeet High School, "Lakers" (1A)
- Ocracoke High School, "Dolphins" (1A)

Eastern Carolina

Schools located in the northeastern part of the state

- North East Carolina Preparatory School, "Huskies" (1A)
- North Edgecombe High School, "Warriors" (1A)
- Rocky Mount Prep, "Jaguars" (1A)
- Sallie B. Howard High School, "Eagles" (1A)
- Washington County High School, "Panthers" (1A)
- Wilson Preparatory Academy, "Tigers" (1A)

Independent

- Eastern North Carolina School for the Deaf, "Hornets" (1A)
- North Carolina School for the Deaf, "Bears" (1A)

Central Tar Heel

Schools located in Alamance, Chatham, Lee, Orange, and Wake counties

- Ascend Leadership Academy, "Aviators" (1A)
- Central Carolina Academy, "Eagles" (1A)
- Chatham Charter High School, "Knights" (1A)
- Clover Garden School, "Grizzlies" (1A)
- River Mill Academy, "Jaguars" (1A)
- Southern Wake Academy, "Lions" (1A)
- Woods Charter School, "Wolves" (1A)

== Awards ==
=== Wells Fargo State Cup ===
The Wells Fargo State Cup is awarded to the high school with the best overall sports excellence in each classification. The State Cup competition is based on a point system, with schools awarded points for their placings in various sanctioned events.

=== Commissioner’s Cup ===
Awarded to NCHSAA teams and athletic programs that highlight community service. Teams identify a community need, host a service project, and host a service project to meet that need.

=== NCHSAA Athlete of the Year ===
The NCHSAA Athlete of the Year Award is awarded annually to a nominated male and female high school athlete in North Carolina, who have demonstrated success in multiple different sports. Winners of this award earn the Pat Best Memorial Trophy, named after the late Pat Best, who was a former principal at Goldsboro High School and president of the NCHSAA at the time of his death in 1988.

=== Hall of Fame ===
The North Carolina High School Athletic Association Hall of Fame, is the hall of fame for high school athletics in North Carolina. It is administered by the NCHSAA and includes athletes, coaches, officials, broadcasters and others who have supported high school athletics throughout the state. The hall was created in 1987, with Bob Jamieson of Greensboro, Leon Brogden of Wilmington, and Dave Harris of Charlotte as charter members.
