= Palisades High School =

Palisades High School or Palisades High may refer to:

- Palisades High School (Pennsylvania), Kintnersville, Bucks County, Pennsylvania
- Palisades High School (North Carolina), Charlotte-Mecklenburg Schools, North Carolina
- Palisades Charter High School, Pacific Palisades, Los Angeles, California
- Palisades High (film), or The Pom Pom Girls, a 1976 American film directed by Joseph Ruben
