= Tryon, Gaston County, North Carolina =

Tryon, North Carolina
- Unincorporated community
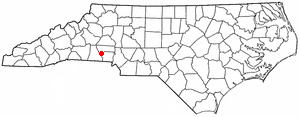
- Location in the U.S. state of North Carolina
- Coordinates: 35°20′23″N 81°19′19″W
- Country: United States
- State: North Carolina
- County: Gaston
- Elevation: 991 ft (302 m)
- Time zone: UTC-5 (Eastern (EST))
  - Summer (DST): UTC-4 (EDT)
- ZIP code: 28016 (Bessemer City)
- Area code: 704
- FIPS code: 37-68570
- GNIS feature ID: 1022992

Tryon is an unincorporated community in Gaston County, North Carolina, United States. It is in Cherryville Township, located approximately 4.7 miles (7.6 km) southeast of the city of Cherryville on North Carolina Highway 274. The rural Gaston County election precinct centered on Tryon had a voting-age population of 1524 in the 2000 Census.

The Tryon community is near the former location of the courthouse of the colonial-era Tryon County. The courthouse was the site of the signing of the Revolutionary-era Tryon Resolves, a declaration of resistance to actions of the British Empire against its American Colonies drawn up after the Battle of Lexington.

Tryon Elementary School, grades K-5, is located in the Tryon community. Its attendance district covers most of eastern unincorporated Cherryville Township. Most of these students feed into John Chavis Middle School and Cherryville High School in Cherryville, while those living in areas southeast of the community attend Bessemer City Middle and High Schools.

Industry in the area includes the Bessemer City Quarry of Martin Marietta Aggregates, a supplier of crushed aggregates for the construction industry, located just east of the community. Fire protection is provided by the Tryonota Volunteer Fire Department.
