= Hunter Huss High School =

American public school in North Carolina

Location
- 1518 Edgefield Ave; Gastonia, North Carolina 28052; United States; 35°14′24″N 81°12′23″W

Information
- Established: 1962 (64 years ago)
- School district: Gaston County Schools
- Category: Public
- CEEB code: 341451
- Principal: Kelsey Elms
- Staff: 61.51 (FTE)
- Enrollment: 1,165 (2024–2025)
- Student to teacher ratio: 18.94
- Colors: Columbia blue, white, and navy
- Team name: Huskies
- Rivals: Ashbrook High School; Forestview High School
- Feeder schools: York Chester Middle School, Southwest Middle School
- Website: gaston.k12.nc.us/huss

Hunter Huss High School (abbreviated HHHS) is a public high school in the Gaston County Schools school district located in Gastonia, NC. It is the oldest existing high school building still used as a high school in Gaston County. Its attendance range covers southwestern Gaston County and includes the western portions of the City of Gastonia as well as the communities of South Gastonia and Crowders Mountain, and the surrounding rural area. The current principal is Ms. Kelsey Elms.

== History ==
Hunter Huss was opened in 1962 and was named for W. Hunter Huss (1902–1971), a Cherryville native and Superintendent of Gaston County Schools from 1937 to 1968. The cost of construction at the time was $2.1 million, or $22.4 million in current value. The school opened to 818 ninth and tenth grade students on August 29, 1962. Two years later, it had 1,554 in grades ninth through twelfth.

== Academics ==
Hunter Huss High School's Career Academy is part of Gaston County Schools' "School Choice Programs." The Career Academy prepares students for careers "in business, trade and industry, food service, public safety, health science, and technology." Previously, Hunter Huss was an International Baccalaureate (IB) World School.

== Facilities ==
The campus occupies 52 acres of land and has 178,000 square feet of indoor space. The auditorium can seat 1,465 and the gymnasium has a capacity for over 1,800. The school completed an $11 million renovation project in 2012. The renovations included a new heating and air conditioning system, replacement of some original windows, new plumbing throughout the entire building and extensive masonry work. Updated science labs, a new media center, wiring for wireless internet, and a television and broadcasting studio were also highlights of the improvements.

== Athletics ==
Hunter Huss High School's team name is the Huskies. The school colors are Columbia blue, white, and navy. Sports offered at Hunter Huss include:

- Baseball
- Basketball
- Cross Country
- Football
- Golf
- Soccer
- Softball
- Swimming
- Tennis
- Indoor/Outdoor Track & Field
- Volleyball
- Wrestling

== Achievements ==
- The Hunter Huss Chess Team won the 2004–2005, 2005–2006 and 2006–2007 3A Chess State Championships.
- The Boy's Basketball Team have won NCHSAA state championships in 1977 (4A), 1985 (4A), 2011 (3A), and 2026 (5A).
- The Boy's Golf Team won the NCHSAA All Classes state championship in 1969.
- The Wrestling Team won the NCHSAA 2A state tournament championship in 2015.

== Notable alumni ==
- Rufus Crawford, NFL and CFL player
- Fred Durst, singer-songwriter best known as the frontman of the rap rock band Limp Bizkit
- Eric Augustus "Sleepy" Floyd, NBA player
- Kathy Harrington, member of North Carolina Senate
- Sylvia Hatchell, women's basketball coach, member of the Basketball Hall of Fame
- Lamar Holmes, NFL and CFL player
- Maria Howell, actress and singer
- Billy James, co-host of John Boy and Billy radio
- Evan Karagias, professional wrestler and actor
- Kris Lang, professional basketball player
- Jon Robinson, radio and television personality
- Hassan Whiteside, NBA player
- Bubba Wilson, NBA player
