= Hawthorne High School =

Hawthorne High School can refer to one of several schools in North America and one in Wales, UK. The following list is ordered by country/state/province/territory and then municipality:

- Hawthorne High School (Hawthorne, California)
- Hawthorne High School (Florida), in Hawthorne, Florida
- Hawthorne High School (New Jersey), in Hawthorne, New Jersey
- Hawthorne High School (North Carolina), in Charlotte, North Carolina
- Hawthorn High School, in Rhondda Cynon Taf, Wales
