= Isaiah Whaley =

American basketball player (born 1998)

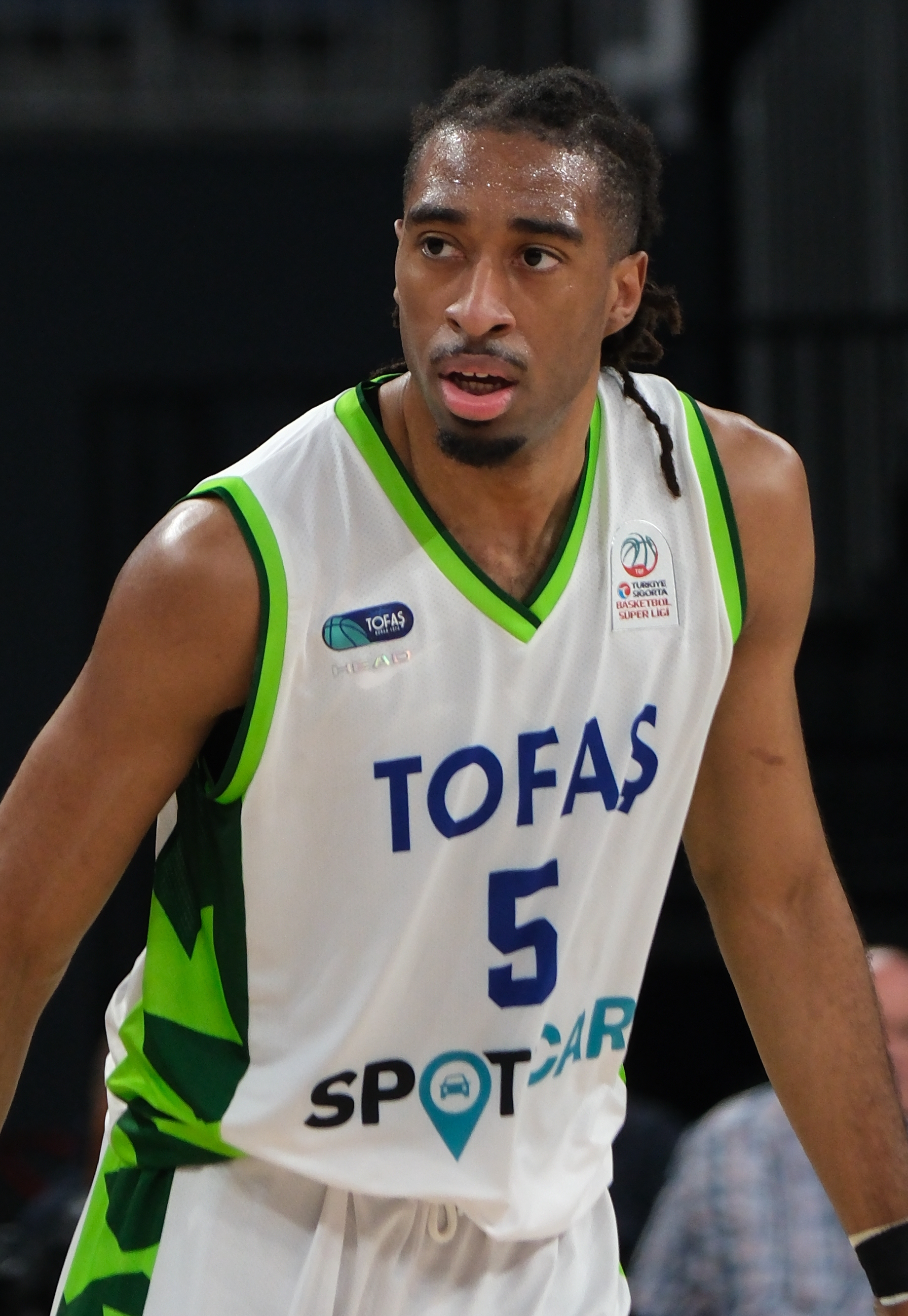
- Whaley playing for Tofaş in 2025

Free Agent
- Position: Center

Personal information
- Born: March 26, 1998 (age 28) Gastonia, North Carolina, U.S.
- Listed height: 6 ft 9 in (2.06 m)
- Listed weight: 225 lb (102 kg)

Career information
- High school: Ashbrook (Gastonia, North Carolina); Evelyn Mack Academy (Charlotte, North Carolina); Mt. Zion Prep (Baltimore, Maryland)
- College: UConn (2017–2022)
- NBA draft: 2022: undrafted
- Playing career: 2022–present

Career history
- 2022–2023: Greensboro Swarm
- 2023: Astros de Jalisco
- 2023–2024: MLP Academics Heidelberg
- 2024–2025: Lokomotiv Kuban
- 2025–2026: Tofaş

Career highlights
- CIBACOPA champion (2023); Big East co-Defensive Player of the Year (2021)
- Stats at NBA.com
- Stats at Basketball Reference

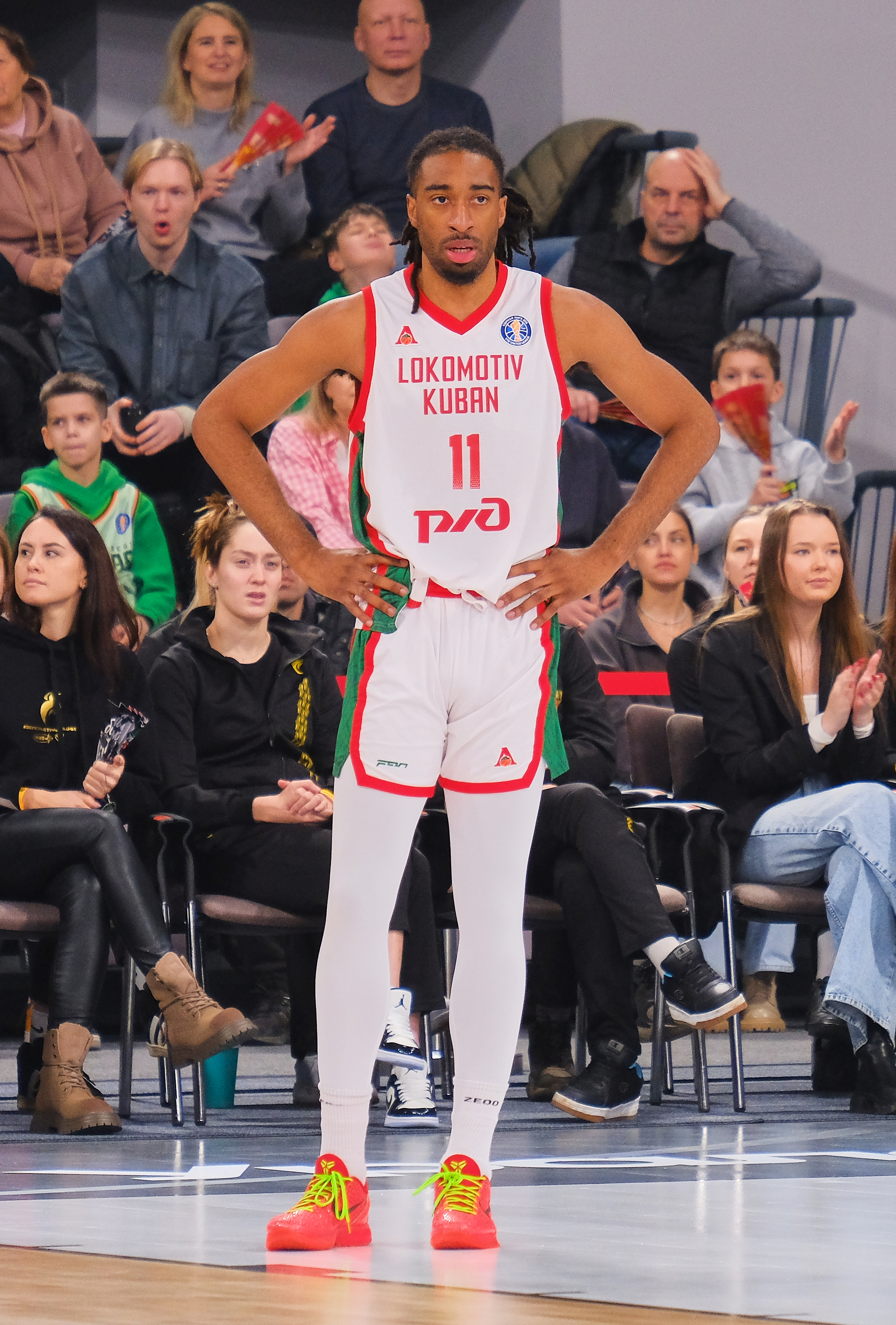
Whaley playing for Lokomotiv Kuban in 2024

Isaiah Whaley (born March 26, 1998) is an American professional basketball player who last played for Tofaş of the Basketbol Süper Ligi (BSL). He played college basketball for the UConn Huskies.

== High school career ==
Whaley was ruled ineligible for his freshman season after transferring to Ashbrook High School in Gastonia, North Carolina. As a junior, he averaged 17.5 points, 9.1 rebounds and 4.7 blocks per game, leading his team to the NCHSAA 3A state title game. For his senior season, he moved to Evelyn Mack Academy in Charlotte, North Carolina. He played a postgraduate season at Mt. Zion Preparatory School in Baltimore, Maryland, averaging 21 points, 11 rebounds and five blocks per game. A three-star recruit, Whaley committed to playing college basketball for UConn over offers from Providence, Seton Hall, Memphis and Georgia, among others.

== College career ==
As a freshman at UConn, Whaley averaged 2.6 points and 2.2 rebounds per game. He suffered an ankle injury prior to his sophomore season and received limited playing time that year. As a junior, Whaley averaged six points, five rebounds and 1.5 blocks per game. He averaged eight points, 6.2 rebounds and 2.6 blocks per game as a senior, earning Big East Co-Defensive Player of the Year honors. Whaley opted to return to UConn for a fifth year. He was held out of a game against Michigan State on November 25, 2021, after fainting the previous day during a double-overtime win over Auburn.

Whaley was named to the American Athletic Conference's All-Academic Team for the 2018–19 season. He received his Bachelor's degree in Urban and Community Studies in May 2021 and pursued graduate studies during the 2021–22 academic year.

== Professional career ==
=== Greensboro Swarm (2022–2023) ===
Whaley signed with the Charlotte Hornets on June 24, 2022, on an Exhibit 10 contract. On October 6, 2022, he was waived by the Hornets. On October 23, it was announced that he had been added to the training camp roster of the Greensboro Swarm. On November 4, 2022, he was named to the opening-night roster for the Swarm.

=== Astros de Jalisco (2023–2023) ===
On April 25, 2023, Whaley signed with the Astros de Jalisco of the Liga Nacional de Baloncesto Profesional and the Circuito de Baloncesto de la Costa del Pacífico (CIBACOPA). He helped them win the 2023 CIBACOPA league title.

=== MLP Academics Heidelberg (2023–2024) ===
Whaley played for the Academics in the 2023–2024 season. He was the team's starting center and posted per-game averages of 11.4 points, 7.2 rebounds, 1.9 assists, 1.2 blocks, and 1.3 steals. He shot 33% from 3-point range, 57.3% on 2-point attempts, and 67.5% from the free throw line.

In July 2024, Whaley joined the Dallas Mavericks for the 2024 NBA Summer League.

=== Tofaş (2025–2026) ===
On July 23, 2025, he signed with Tofaş of the Basketbol Süper Ligi (BSL).

== Career statistics ==
Legend
GP	Games played	GS	Games started	MPG	Minutes per game
FG%	Field goal percentage	3P%	3-point field goal percentage	FT%	Free throw percentage
RPG	Rebounds per game	APG	Assists per game	SPG	Steals per game
BPG	Blocks per game	PPG	Points per game	**Bold**	Career high

=== College ===
Year	Team	GP	GS	MPG	FG%	3P%	FT%	RPG	APG	SPG	BPG	PPG
2017–18	UConn	**30**	12	13.8	.558	–	.679	2.2	.3	.4	1.0	2.6
2018–19	UConn	23	0	3.6	**.667**	–	.333	1.0	.0	.1	.2	.8
2019–20	UConn	**30**	6	18.8	.540	–	**.733**	5.0	.6	.6	1.5	6.0
2020–21	UConn	23	**23**	**27.6**	.479	**.348**	.469	**6.2**	**1.5**	**1.0**	**2.6**	**8.0**
Career		106	41	16.0	.518	.348	.628	3.6	.6	.5	1.3	4.3
