= Bessemer City High School =

Bessemer City High School may refer to:

- Bessemer City High School (Alabama)
- Bessemer City High School (North Carolina)
