= Shell Service Station =

Shell Service Station may refer to:

- Shell Service Station (Winston-Salem, North Carolina), listed on the National Register of Historic Places
- Beam's Shell Service Station and Office, Cherryville, North Carolina, also NRHP-listed
