= Stan Crisson =

Canadian football player

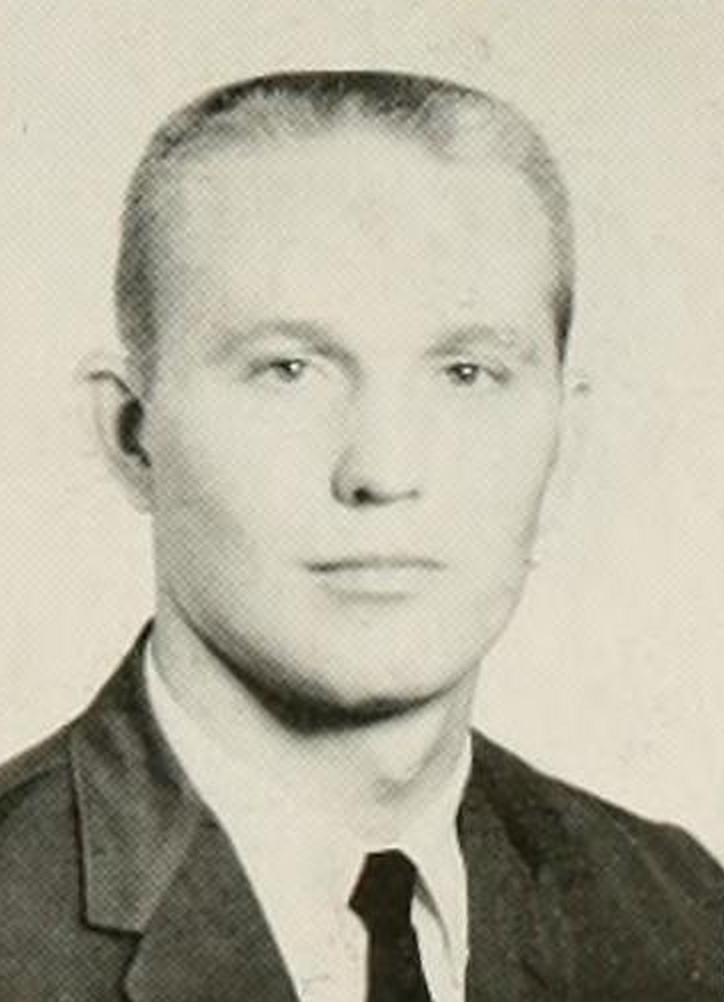
- Crisson at Duke University, circa 1964

Profile
- Position: Halfback

Personal information
- Born: May 1, 1941 (age 85); Cherryville, North Carolina, U.S.
- Listed height: 6 ft 1 in (1.85 m)
- Listed weight: 205 lb (93 kg)

Career information
- High school: Cherryville (NC)
- College: Duke

Career history
- 1964–1965: Hamilton Tiger-Cats

Awards and highlights
- Grey Cup champion (1965); First-team All-ACC (1963)

John Stanley Crisson (born May 1, 1941) was an American professional football player who played for the Hamilton Tiger-Cats. He won the Grey Cup with them in 1965. He played college football at Duke University in Durham, North Carolina.
