= West Iredell High School =

American public school in North Carolina

Location
- 213 Warrior Dr; Statesville, North Carolina 28625; United States; 35°47′37″N 80°59′28″W

Information
- School type: Public
- Founded: 1973 (53 years ago)
- School district: Iredell-Statesville Schools
- CEEB code: 343797
- Principal: Benjamin Johnson
- Teaching staff: 46.05 (FTE)
- Grades: 9–12
- Enrollment: 795 (2023-2024)
- Student to teacher ratio: 17.26
- Colors: Green and gold
- Athletics: NCHSAA 4A
- Athletics conference: Western Foothills 4A/5A
- Team name: Warriors
- Website: westhigh.issnc.org

West Iredell High School is a public high school located in Statesville, North Carolina. It is part of the Iredell-Statesville Schools district.

== About ==
The students of "West", as it is known throughout the county, are currently 76% Caucasian, 18% African-American, 10% Hispanic, 2% Asian, <1% Multi-Racial, and <1% American Indian. West offers the standard high school core curriculum. Since 2004 the school has added three new AP courses, Latin I and II, and nine new honor courses to the curriculum.

== Classes ==
The high school does also offer a full range of visual and performing arts classes; adding pottery to the visual arts program in recent years. West offers courses in all of the Career Pathways, an Army JROTC program, and an after school Credit Recovery Program. With the Virtual High School, the students have unlimited course offerings. West also enjoys a strong partnership with Mitchell Community College where the students can take entry level college courses and Huskins Courses.

== Athletics ==
The school mascot is the Warrior. They compete in the Western Foothills 4A/5A conference as a 4A school:

Bandys (4A) Bunker Hill (4A) Fred T. Foard (4A) Maiden (4A) Newton-Conover (4A) West Iredell (4A) East Lincoln (5A) Hickory (5A) North Lincoln (5A)

West Iredell ADM for 2024-2025 school year is: 830

Fall sports include football, cross country, women's tennis, men's soccer, women's golf, and cheerleading. Winter sports include men's and women's basketball, wrestling, and swimming. Men's tennis, track & field, softball, baseball, women's soccer, and men's golf are all offered in the spring.

== Notable alumni ==
- Jerome Henderson, former NFL cornerback, current NFL defensive backs coach
