= Beam's Shell Service Station and Office =

Historic buildings in North Carolina, US

- Beam's Shell Service Station and Office, (Former)
- U.S. National Register of Historic Places
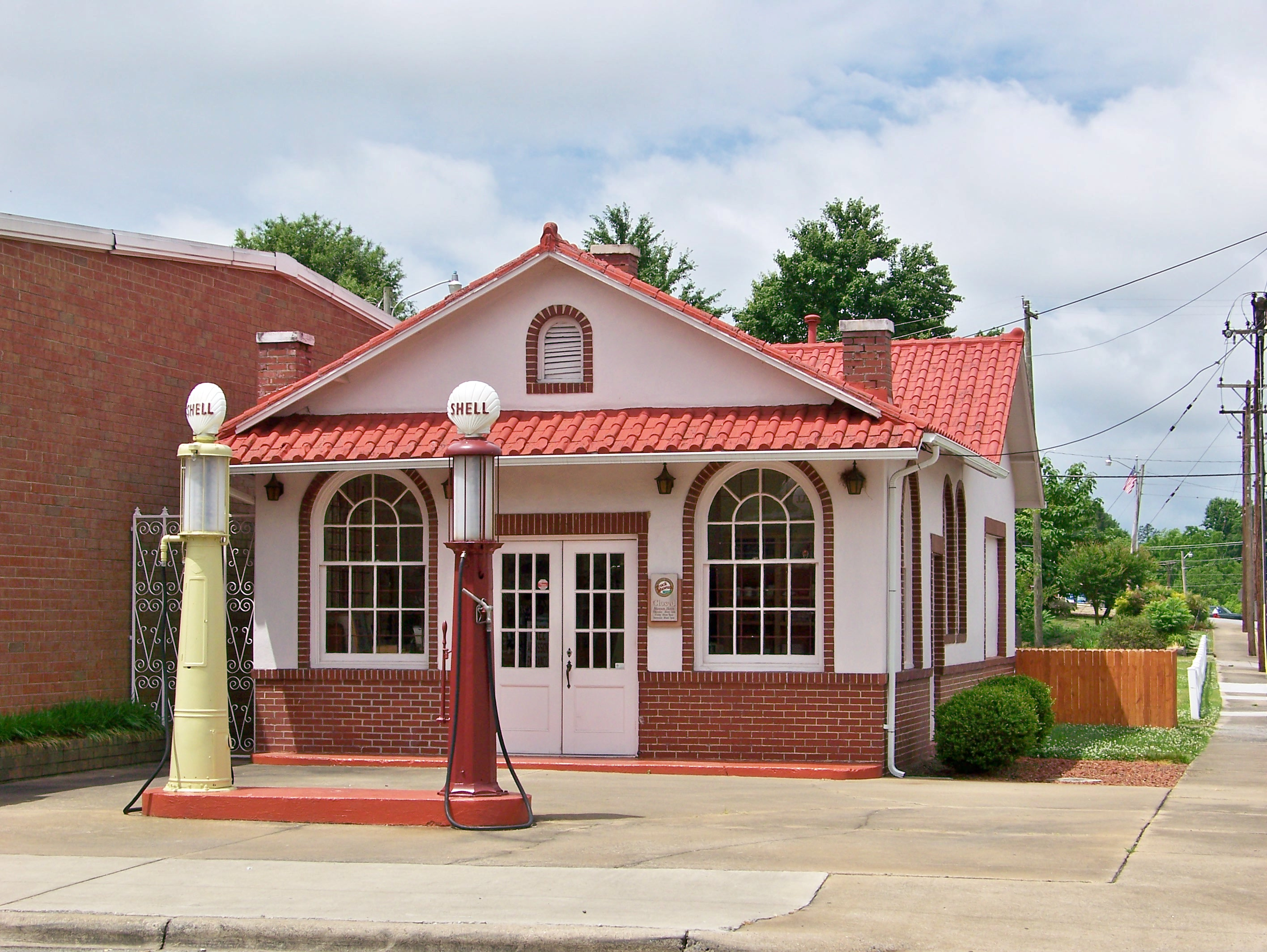

- Location within North Carolina Location within the United States
- Location: 117 N. Mountain St., Cherryville, North Carolina
- Coordinates: 35°22′47″N 81°22′48″W
- Area: less than one acre
- Built: 1930
- Architectural style: Mission/spanish Revival
- NRHP reference No.: 97001221
- Added to NRHP: October 17, 1997

Beam's Shell Service Station and Office, also known as C. Grier Beam Truck Museum, is a historic service station located at 117 N. Mountain St. in Cherryville, Gaston County, North Carolina. It was built about 1930 by the Shell Oil Company, and is a one-story, rectangular Mission/spanish Revival style building. Associated with the service station are the original pump island and gasoline pumps. The building features a brick water table and brick trim on a stuccoed construction.

It was listed on the National Register of Historic Places in 1997.

== C. Grier Beam Truck Museum ==
The C. Grier Beam Truck Museum features historic trucks from the former Carolina Freight Carriers Corporation, which began in the historic gas station in the 1930s. The company was bought out by the Arkansas Best Corporation in the 1990s. The museum also features early models of tractors and trailers, trucking and company memorabilia. The museum building was constructed in 1987 adjacent to the gas station. Its exterior features a brick veneer.

== See also ==
- Shell Service Station (Winston-Salem, North Carolina)
