= British Brooks =

American football player (born 1999)

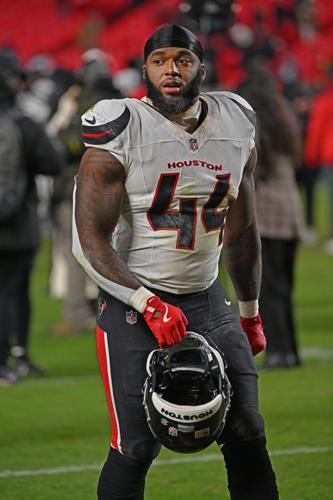
- Brooks in 2024

No. 44 – Houston Texans
- Position: Fullback
- Roster status: Injured reserve

Personal information
- Born: November 18, 1999 (age 26); Gastonia, North Carolina, U.S.
- Listed height: 5 ft 11 in (1.80 m)
- Listed weight: 225 lb (102 kg)

Career information
- High school: Ashbrook (Gastonia)
- College: North Carolina (2018–2023)
- NFL draft: 2024: undrafted

Career history
- Houston Texans (2024–present)

Career NFL statistics as of Week 18, 2025
- Rushing attempts: 17
- Rushing yards: 78
- Rushing average: 4.6
- Tackles: 11
- Stats at Pro Football Reference

British Brooks (born November 18, 1999) is an American professional fullback for the Houston Texans of the National Football League (NFL). He played college football for the North Carolina Tar Heels.

== Early life ==
Brooks attended Ashbrook High School in Gastonia, North Carolina, where he was a standout running back. Over his final two seasons, he rushed for a total of 2,597 yards and 31 touchdowns. As a junior, he earned Big South Offensive Player of the Year honors after rushing for 1,253 yards and 16 touchdowns and was named first-team All-Big South Conference. Going into his senior year, he was recognized as a preseason WSOC Big 22 standout. In his senior season he compiled 1,344 rushing yards and 15 touchdowns, including a career-high 272 yards and four touchdowns in a single game, earning first-team All-Big South Conference honors once again.

Following high school, Brooks chose to walk on to play college football for the North Carolina Tar Heels.

== College career ==
As a true freshman in 2018, he appeared in six games, carrying the ball seven times for 57 yards. In 2019, he played in 11 games and scored his first collegiate rushing touchdown against Mercer, while recording multiple single-tackle games on special teams.

Brooks’ playing time increased over the following seasons. In 2020, he appeared in all 12 games, making his first collegiate start at running back in the Orange Bowl against Texas A&M and finishing the season with 99 rushing yards on 24 attempts. Brooks was also named Special Teams MVP and captain. In 2021, he had a breakout season. Brooks in 11 games and rushing 31 times for 295 yards and four touchdowns. He set a career-high with 124 yards on 15 carries against NC State in the season finale and recorded 72 yards and a 63-yard touchdown against South Carolina in the Duke’s Mayo Bowl, marking the longest rushing touchdown in the bowl’s history. Brooks also earned Special Teams MVP and served as captain again and contributed six tackles on special teams that season.

Brooks missed the entire 2022 season due to a knee injury. He returned for his final collegiate season in 2023, appearing in 12 games with two starts and totaling 75 carries for 387 yards and two touchdowns, along with 14 receptions for 73 yards. He rushed for over 50 yards in four games, including a 103-yard performance in the season opener against South Carolina, earning ACC Running Back of the Week honors.

Over his college career, Brooks appeared in 52 games, rushing for 848 yards and seven touchdowns, while making 17 tackles on special teams.

== Professional career ==
Pre-draft measurables
Height	Weight	Arm length	Hand span	Wingspan	40-yard dash	10-yard split	20-yard split	20-yard shuttle	Three-cone drill	Vertical jump	Broad jump	Bench press
5 ft 10 1/8 in (1.78 m)	219 lb (99 kg)	29 5/8 in (0.75 m)	9 1/8 in (0.23 m)	6 ft 1 5/8 in (1.87 m)	4.59 s	1.57 s	2.59 s	4.43 s	7.09 s	37.0 in (0.94 m)	10 ft 3 in (3.12 m)	27 reps
All values from Pro Day

=== 2024 ===
After not being selected in the 2024 NFL draft, Brooks signed with the Houston Texans as an undrafted free agent. After impressing the team in training camp and the preseason, he made the Texans' initial 53 man roster.

Brooks played in five games for the Texans as a rookie before he was placed on injured reserve for the remainder of his rookie season. He had one rushing attempt for two yards, one tackle on special teams, and played nine offensive snaps and 79 special teams snaps.

== NFL career statistics ==
General				Offense												Defense													
Year	Team	Games		Rushing					Receiving					Fumbles		Tackles					Interceptions						Fumbles		
Year	Team	GS	GP	Att	Yards	Y/A	Lng	TD	Rec	Yds	Y/R	Lng	TD	Fum	Lost	Cmb	Solo	Ast	Sck	TFL	PD	Int	Yds	Avg	Lng	TD	FF	FR	TD
2024	HOU	0	5	1	2	2.0	2	0	0	0	0.0	0	0	0	0	1	1	0	0	0	0	0	0	0	0	0	0	0	0
2025	HOU	0	14	4	15	3.8	9	0	0	0	0.0	0	0	0	0	10	6	4	0	0	0	0	0	0	0	0	0	0	0
Career		0	19	5	17	3.4	9	0	0	0.0	0	0	0	0	0	11	7	4	0	0	0	0	0	0	0	0	0	0	0
