= Phil Crosby (American football) =

American football player (born 1976)

No. 41
- Position: Fullback

Personal information
- Born: November 5, 1976 (age 50); Bessemer City, North Carolina, U.S.
- Listed height: 6 ft 0 in (1.83 m)
- Listed weight: 242 lb (110 kg)

Career information
- High school: Bessemer City (NC)
- College: Tennessee
- NFL draft: 2000: undrafted

Career history
- Buffalo Bills (2000–2003)
- Stats at Pro Football Reference

Phillip Jermaine Crosby (born November 5, 1976) is an American former professional football player who was a fullback for the Buffalo Bills of the National Football League (NFL) from 2001 until 2003. After a year at Coffeyville Community College, he played college football for the Tennessee Volunteers.
