= Jerome Henderson =

American football player and coach (born 1969)

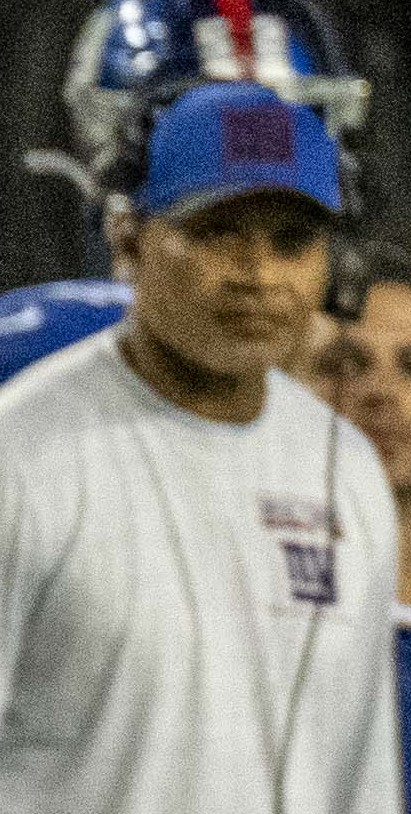
- Henderson in 2021

Indianapolis Colts
- Title: Defensive backs coach

Personal information
- Born: August 8, 1969 (age 57); Statesville, North Carolina, U.S.
- Listed height: 5 ft 10 in (1.78 m)
- Listed weight: 200 lb (91 kg)

Career information
- Position: Cornerback (No. 36, 26)
- High school: West Iredell (Statesville)
- College: Clemson (1987–1990)
- NFL draft: 1991: 2nd round, 41st overall pick

Career history

Playing
- New England Patriots (1991–1993); Buffalo Bills (1993–1994); Philadelphia Eagles (1995); New England Patriots (1996); New York Jets (1997–1998)

Coaching
- New York Jets (2007) Assistant defensive backs coach; New York Jets (2008) Defensive backs coach; Cleveland Browns (2009–2011) Defensive backs coach; Dallas Cowboys (2012–2015) Defensive backs coach; Atlanta Falcons (2016–2019) Defensive passing game coordinator; New York Giants (2020–2023) Defensive backs coach; New York Giants (2024) Defensive backs coach & passing game coordinator; Indianapolis Colts (2025–present) Defensive backs coach

Operations
- New York Jets (2006–2007) Director of player of development

Career NFL statistics
- Total tackles: 228
- Interceptions: 9
- Sacks: 1
- Touchdowns: 2
- Stats at Pro Football Reference

Jerome Virgil Henderson (born August 8, 1969) is an American professional football coach and former player who is currently serving as the defensive backs coach for the Indianapolis Colts of the National Football League (NFL). He played in the NFL as a cornerback for the New England Patriots, Buffalo Bills, Philadelphia Eagles, and New York Jets.

== Playing career ==
Henderson played college football for the Clemson Tigers and was selected in the second round of the 1991 NFL draft. He played in two Super Bowls; one with the Buffalo Bills in Super Bowl XXVIII and another with the New England Patriots in Super Bowl XXXI.

Pre-draft measurables
Height	Weight	Arm length	Hand span	40-yard dash	10-yard split	20-yard split	20-yard shuttle	Vertical jump	Broad jump	Bench press
5 ft 10 3/4 in (1.80 m)	189 lb (86 kg)	32 1/2 in (0.83 m)	9 1/2 in (0.24 m)	4.47 s	1.58 s	2.61 s	4.14 s	32.5 in (0.83 m)	9 ft 7 in (2.92 m)	12 reps
All values from NFL Combine

== Coaching career ==
=== New York Jets ===
Henderson spent two years coaching defensive backs with the New York Jets.

=== Cleveland Browns ===
Henderson went to Cleveland after his stint with the Jets, following head coach Eric Mangini. He spent three seasons as the Cleveland Browns' defensive backs coach.

=== Dallas Cowboys ===
Henderson joined the Cowboys’ staff in 2012. Henderson was reunited with Rob Ryan, who served as the Browns' defensive coordinator from 2009 to 2010 before filling the same role for the Cowboys in 2011. Henderson left Dallas following the 2015 season.

=== Atlanta Falcons ===
After interviewing for a head coach job with the Browns, Henderson ended up as a coach with the Falcons. In the 2016 season, Henderson and the Falcons reached Super Bowl LI, where they faced the New England Patriots on February 5, 2017. In the Super Bowl, the Falcons fell in a 34–28 overtime defeat. The Falcons dismissed Henderson after the 2019 season, his fourth working for the team. He had served as Atlanta’s secondary coach/defensive passing game coordinator.

=== New York Giants ===
On January 21, 2020, the New York Giants hired Henderson to be the team’s defensive backs coach. Henderson has remained with the Giants under head coaches Joe Judge and Brian Daboll.

In May 2022, defensive coordinator Wink Martindale called Henderson "the best secondary coach in the league."

In January 2024, Henderson interviewed for the Giants defensive coordinator job, vacated by Martindale. While he did not get the job, he added the title of passing game coordinator. Henderson and the Giants parted ways on January 16, 2025.

=== Indianapolis Colts ===
On February 21, 2025, the Indianapolis Colts hired Henderson to serve as the team's defensive backs coach.

== Personal life ==
Henderson and his wife, Traci, have three children, Jazmin and twins Taylor and Tyler.
