= Ashbrook High School (North Carolina) =

High school in Gastonia, North Carolina

Location
- 2222 S. New Hope Rd; Gastonia, North Carolina 28054; United States; 35°14′38″N 81°07′38″W

Information
- Established: 1970 (56 years ago)
- School district: Gaston County Schools
- Category: Public school
- CEEB code: 341445
- Principal: Matt Rikard
- Staff: 115
- Enrollment: 1,386 (2024-2025)
- Colors: Kelly green and white
- Fight song: "On Gastonia"
- Mascot: Mighty Green Wave
- Team name: Green Wave
- Rivals: Hunter Huss; Forestview
- Feeder schools: W.P. Grier, Cramerton, Holbrook
- Website: ashbrook.gaston.k12.nc.us

Ashbrook High School is a public high school in the Gaston County Schools public school district located in Gastonia, North Carolina.

== History ==
The school was the result of the merger of two former senior high schools, Holbrook Senior High and Ashley Senior High. The first class graduated in 1971.

Ashbrook's attendance range covers most of the central and eastern portions of the City of Gastonia, as well as the towns of Ranlo and Lowell, and the community of Springdale.

== Athletics ==
Ashbrook High School's team name is the Green Wave. The school colors are kelly green and white. Sports offered at Ashbrook include:

- Baseball
- Basketball
- Cross Country
- Football
- Golf
- Soccer
- Softball
- Swimming
- Tennis
- Indoor/Outdoor Track & Field
- Volleyball
- Wrestling

== Notable alumni ==
- Darrell Armstrong, former NBA player, assistant coach for the Dallas Mavericks
- British Brooks, NFL fullback for the Houston Texans
- Wiley Cash, New York Times best-selling novelist
- Wes Helms, former MLB player and current manager of the Charlotte Knights
- Patrick McHenry, U.S. representative for North Carolina's 10th congressional district
- Ricky Rainey, UFC fighter
- Michal Smolen, Olympic slalom canoeist, represented USA at 2016 and 2020 Summer Olympics
- Jeb Stuart, American screenwriter, film director, and producer
- Isaiah Whaley, professional basketball player, plays professionally for USC Heidelberg in Germany
- James Worthy, former NBA player and member of the Basketball Hall of Fame
