= Palisades High School (North Carolina) =

American public school in North Carolina

Location
- 15221 York Road; Charlotte, North Carolina 28278; United States; 35°05′31″N 81°01′23″W

Information
- School type: Public
- Established: 2022 (4 years ago)
- School district: Charlotte-Mecklenburg Schools
- Principal: Erik Olejarczyk
- Staff: 110.58 (FTE)
- Grades: 9–12
- Enrollment: 2,241 (2023-2024)
- Student to teacher ratio: 20.27
- Colors: Teal and purple
- Athletics: NCHSAA 8A
- Athletics conference: Southwestern 7A/8A
- Mascot: Pumas
- Team name: Pumas
- Website: www.cmsk12.org/palisadeshs

Palisades High School is a public high school in Charlotte, North Carolina. It is a part of the Charlotte-Mecklenburg Schools district.

== History ==
Palisades High School opened its doors to students in August 2022, relieving overcrowding at Olympic High School. For all but a few years since its opening in 1966, Olympic had been the only high school in southwestern Mecklenburg County.

The school is located in the Palisades community in southwest Charlotte, near the South Carolina border that is along Lake Wylie.

== Athletics ==
Palisades is a member of the North Carolina High School Athletic Association (NCHSAA) and is classified as an 8A school. It is a part of the Southwestern 7A/8A Conference. The school colors are teal and purple, and its team name are the Pumas. Listed below are the different sport teams at Palisades:

- Baseball
- Basketball
- Cheerleading
- Cross Country
- Football
- Golf
- Lacrosse
- Soccer
- Softball
- Swimming
- Tennis
- Track & Field
- Volleyball
- Wrestling
