= Charlotte-Mecklenburg Schools =

School district for Charlotte and Mecklenburg County, North Carolina

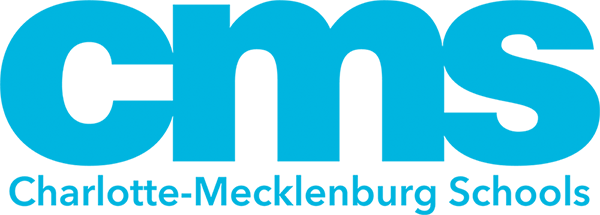

Location
- 4421 Stuart Andrew Blvd. Charlotte, North Carolina 28217 City of Charlotte and Mecklenburg County, North Carolina

District information
- Established: 1 January 1960; 66 years ago
- Superintendent: TBA
- Accreditations: Southern Association of Colleges and Schools
- Schools: 184
- Budget: $1.612 billion
- NCES District ID: 3702970

Students and staff
- Students: 148,299
- Teachers: 9000+

Other information
- Website: www.cmsk12.org

Charlotte-Mecklenburg Schools (abbreviated CMS) is a local education agency headquartered in Charlotte, North Carolina and is the public school system for Mecklenburg County. With over 147,000 students enrolled, it is the second-largest school district in North Carolina and the eighteenth-largest in the nation. The system is best known nationally for its role as the respondent in the landmark 1971 Supreme Court decision Swann v. Charlotte-Mecklenburg Schools.

== History ==
In 1974, the school assignment plan was updated to include 4 "other schools" these schools were the predecessors of magnet schools. In March 1992, a school assignment plan was developed that included magnet schools. In 2016 the nine board members all voted to create a magnet school program in which different socioeconomic groups would be integrated.

== Graduations ==
The 2024 district-wide graduation rate is 84.4% and has declined 3.9 percentage points since 2015. The state's is 86.9% and has increased 1.3 percentage points since 2015.

== Governance ==
The Charlotte-Mecklenburg Board of Education, or school board, consists of 9 members—3 at-large and 6 from districts. Before 1995, the board had been elected entirely on an at-large basis, but this was changed after it was discovered nearly all of the board members lived in the eastern part of the county. Members serve staggered four-year terms; the at-large members are elected in the year before presidential elections and the district members are elected in the year after presidential elections. Although school board elections are nonpartisan, the district members are elected from the same districts as the county commissioners.

== List of superintendents ==
The following individuals have served as superintendents of CMS and its preceding agencies.

=== Superintendent of Charlotte City Schools ===
- T.J. Mitchell (1882–1886)
- John T. Corlew (1886–1888)
- Dr. Alexander Graham (1888–1913)
- Dr. Harry Harding (1913–1949)
- Dr. Elmer Garinger (1949–1960)

=== Superintendent of Mecklenburg County Schools ===
- James W. Wilson (1944–1960)

=== Superintendent of Charlotte-Mecklenburg Schools ===
- Dr. Elmer Garinger (1960–1962)
- Dr. A. Craig Phillips (1962–1967)
- Dr. William C. Self (1967–1973)
- Dr. Roland W. Jones (1973–1977)
- Dr. Jay M. Robinson (1977–1987)
- Dr. Peter Relic (1987–1991)
- Dr. John Murphy (1991–1996)
- Dr. Eric Smith (1996–2002)
- Dr. James L. Pughsley (2002–2005)
  - Dr. Frances Haithcock (2005–2006, interim)
- Dr. Peter Gorman (2006–2011)
  - Hugh Hattabaugh (2011–2012, interim)
- Dr. Heath Morrison (2012–2014)
- Ann Blakeney Clark (2014–2017)
- Dr. Clayton Wilcox (2017–2019)
- Earnest Winston (August 2019–April 2022)
  - Hugh Hattabaugh (April–December 2022, interim)
  - Dr. Crystal Hill (December 2022–May 2023, interim)
- Dr. Crystal Hill (May 2023–September 2026)

== High schools ==
Charlotte-Mecklenburg Schools (CMS) operates 22 high schools, including the two largest in North Carolina: Myers Park High School with 3,103 students and Ardrey Kell High School with 3,033 students.

=== University City, Huntersville and North Charlotte ===
- Cato Middle College High School (2007, Cato Cougar)
- Charlotte Engineering Early College (2014)
- Charlotte Teacher Early College (2017, Eagle)
- Hopewell High School (2001, Titans)
- Merancas Middle College @ CPCC (2017, Wolf)
- Mallard Creek High School (2007, Mavericks)
- North Mecklenburg High School (1951, Vikings)
- Julius L. Chambers High School, (1997, Cougars)
- William A. Hough High School (2010, Huskies)

=== Mint Hill, Matthews, and East Charlotte ===
- David W. Butler High School (1997, Bulldogs)
- East Mecklenburg High School (1950, Eagles)
- Garinger High School (1908, Wildcats: formerly Charlotte Central High School from 1923 until 1959)
- Levine Middle College High School (2014, Hornet)
- Independence High School (1967, Patriots)
- Rocky River High School (2010, Ravens)

=== Pineville, Ballantyne, Providence, and South Charlotte ===
- Ardrey Kell High School (2006, Knights)
- Ballantyne Ridge High School (2024, Wolves)
- Harper Middle College High School (2005, Greyhounds)
- Myers Park High School (1951, Mustangs)
- Olympic High School (1966, Trojans)
- South Mecklenburg High School (1959, Sabres)
- Palisades High School (2022, Pumas)
- Providence High School (1989, Panthers)

=== West Charlotte ===
- Phillip O. Berry Academy of Technology (2002, Cardinals)
- Harding University High School (1935, Rams)
- West Charlotte High School (1938, Lions)
- West Mecklenburg High School (1951, Hawks)

=== Uptown Charlotte ===
- Central Piedmont Early College (2023, Eagles)
- Hawthorne Academy of Health Sciences (2006, Hawks)

== Middle schools ==
- Albemarle Road Middle School (Hornets)
- Alexander Graham Middle School (Bulldogs)
- Bailey Middle School (Broncos)
- Carmel Middle School (Cougars)
- Cato Ridge Middle School (Wolverines)
- Cochrane Collegiate Academy (Grade 6–12) (Colts)
- Community House Middle School (Cavaliers)
- Coulwood Middle School (Catamounts)
- Crestdale Middle School (Wildcats)
- Eastway Middle School (Jaguars)
- Francis Bradley Middle School (Mavericks)
- First Ward Creative Arts Academy (Firebirds)
- J. M. Alexander Middle School (Blue Devils)
- Williams Secondary Montessori (Grade 7–12) (Trailblazers)
- James Martin Middle School (Cougars)
- Jay M. Robinson Middle School (Chargers)
- Kennedy Middle School (Wapitis)
- Marie G. Davis Middle School (Jaguars)
- Martin Luther King Jr. Middle School (Lions)
- McClintock Middle School (Mighty Scots)
- Mint Hill Middle School (Miners)
- Northeast Middle School (Eagles)
- Northwest School of the Arts (Grade 6–12) (Dragon)
- Northridge Middle School (Hawks)
- Piedmont Open IB Middle School (Pirates)
- Quail Hollow Middle School (Falcons)
- Randolph Middle School (Raiders)
- Ranson Middle School (Raiders)
- Rea Farms STEAM Academy (Falcons)
- Ridge Road Middle School (Ravens)
- Sedgefield Middle School (Spartans)
- South Charlotte Middle School (Shockers)
- Southwest Middle School (Patriots)
- Whitewater Middle School (Gators)
- Wilson Stem Academy (Wolverines)

== Elementary schools ==
The International Baccalaureate (IB) Program is offered at many schools.

- Albemarle Road Elementary School
- Allenbrook Elementary School
- Ashley Park Elementary School (Pre-K–8)
- Bain Elementary School
- Ballantyne Elementary School
- Berryhill Elementary School
- Barnette Elementary School
- Berewick Elementary School
- Beverly Woods Elementary School
- Billingsville/Cotswold Elementary School
- Blythe Elementary School
- Briarwood Elementary School
- Bruns Avenue Elementary School
- Chantilly Montessori Elementary School
- Charles H. Parker Academic Center
- Charlotte East Language Academy (K–8)
- Clear Creek Elementary School
- Collinswood Language Academy
- Cornelius Elementary School
- Croft Community School
- Crown Point Elementary School
- David Cox Road Elementary School
- Davidson Elementary School
- Devonshire Elementary School
- Dilworth Elementary School
- Druid Hills Academy (pre-k to 8)
- Eastover Elementary School
- Elizabeth Lane Elementary School
- Elizabeth Traditional Elementary School
- Elon Park Elementary School
- Endhaven Elementary School
- Esperanza Global Academy
- First Ward Creative Arts Academy
- Governors' Village STEM Academy-Lower campus grade Pre-K to 4 and Upper Campus grade 5–8
- Grand Oak Elementary School
- Greenway Park Elementary School
- Joseph W. Grier Academy
- Grove Park Elementary School
- Hawk Ridge Elementary School
- Hickory Grove Elementary School
- Hidden Valley Elementary School
- Highland Creek Elementary School
- Highland Mill Montessori Elementary School
- Highland Creek Elementary School
- Hidden Valley Elementary School
- Highland Renaissance Elementary School
- Hornets Nest Elementary School
- Huntersville Elementary School
- Huntingtowne Farms Elementary School
- Idlewild Elementary School
- Irwin Academic Center
- J. H. Gunn Elementary School
- J. V. Washam Elementary School
- Joseph W. Grier Elementary School
- Knights View Elementary School
- Lake Wylie Elementary School
- Lansdowne Elementary School
- Lebanon Road Elementary School
- Lincoln Heights Elementary School
- Long Creek Elementary School
- Mallard Creek Elementary School
- Matthews Elementary School
- McAlpine Elementary School
- McKee Road Elementary School
- Merry Oaks Elementary School
- Mint Hill Elementary School
- Montclaire Elementary School
- Mountain Island Lake Academy
- Myers Park Traditional Elementary School
- Nations Ford Elementary School
- Newell Elementary School
- North Academy of World Languages (K–8)
- Oakdale Elementary School
- Oakhurst Elementary School
- Oaklawn Language Academy
- Olde Providence Elementary School
- Lawrence Orr Elementary School
- Palisades Park Elementary
- Parkside Elementary School
- Paw Creek Elementary School
- Pineville Elementary School
- Pinewood Elementary School
- Piney Grove Elementary School
- Polo Ridge Elementary School
- Plaza Road Pre-K School
- Providence Spring Elementary School
- Rama Road Elementary School
- Rea Farms STEAM Academy
- Reedy Creek Elementary School
- Reid Park Elementary School
- Renaissance West STEAM Academy (Pre-K to 8)
- River Gate Elementary School
- River Oaks Academy
- Sedgefield Elementary School
- Selwyn Elementary School
- Shamrock Gardens Elementary School
- Sharon Elementary School
- Smithfield Elementary School
- South Academy of International Languages
- South Pine Academy
- Starmount Academy of Excellence
- Statesville Road Elementary School
- Steele Creek Elementary School
- Sterling Elementary School
- Stoney Creek Elementary School
- Thomasboro Elementary School
- Torrence Creek Elementary School
- Tuckaseegee Elementary School
- University Meadows Elementary School
- University Park Elementary School
- Dorothy J. Vaughan Academy of Technology
- Villa Heights Elementary School
- J.V. Washam Elementary School
- Walter G. Byers Elementary School
- Westerly Hills Elementary School
- Winding Springs Elementary School
- Windsor Park Elementary School
- Winget Park Elementary School
- Winterfield Elementary School

== Alternative schools ==
- Charlotte-Mecklenburg Academy
- Metro School
- Turning Point Academy -Formerly Derita Alternative School
- Turning Point Academy Middle School

== Achievements ==
Several CMS high schools have been recognized by Newsweek as being among the 100 best high schools in the United States, a statistic based on the number of advanced classes that are offered to students.

During the 2006–2007 school year CMS students received $43.5 million in academic merit-based financial aid from universities and other organizations, and $12.1 million in athletic scholarships.

== Criticisms ==
=== Judge Howard Manning ===
In May 2005, Wake County Superior Court Judge Howard Manning Jr. issued a ruling in which he accused CMS of "academic genocide" against at-risk, low-income students in low-scoring high schools. Since the debut of its new student assignment plan in 2002, and the end of its court-ordered busing program, CMS has seen an increase in concentrations of poverty, with schools that have student-poverty rates of at least 75 percent at twice the number they were before. In the same year, Judge Manning also threatened to close 4 of the lowest performing high schools, Garinger, Waddell, West Charlotte and West Mecklenburg. Many teachers and parents felt he had gone too far, and, in the end, this never occurred as the 4 high schools presented turnaround plans and their principals were deemed capable of carrying them out. The high schools are now included in a special Achievement Zone.

=== 2005 and 2007 bond packages ===
56% of voters rejected a $427 million bond package in 2005 to improve facilities and build new schools for the first time in a decade. Dissenters cited spats between members of the school board and other well-publicized events that year hurting their confidence in the district's ability to spend money effectively. A$516 million bond package was backed by 68% of voters in November 2007.

=== Decentralization ===
Calls for decentralization mounted in 2005 as dissatisfaction with CMS grew, with some wanting CMS broken up into smaller school systems. One notable incarnation of this movement was called DUMP (Don't Underestimate Mecklenburg Parents) CMS. This effort abated when the Board of Education requested and newly hired Superintendent Peter Gorman outlined a plan for decentralization, with the stated goal of putting resources and administration closer to parents and other members of the public. Regional offices known as "learning communities", each with an area superintendent, were implemented in the 2007–2008 school year.

=== Handling of sexual assault allegations ===
Multiple students and their families have alleged reporting sexual assaults has led to dismissive responses and retributive action from CMS administrators. The allegations span from 2014 through 2021.

A widely covered allegation is in regards to a female student who was sexually harassed from seventh grade in 2014 onward, escalating to sexual assault in her freshman year in 2016. All of the alleged harassment and the assault occurred on various CMS campuses. Mark Bosco, the principal at Myers Park High School where the alleged sexual assault took place, was suspended with pay and later reassigned to an administrative position within the school district; this move was widely reported and criticized by students and their families. As of June 2022, a lawsuit is currently in progress regarding CMS' handling of sexual assault allegations.
