= Cherryville, North Carolina =

- City
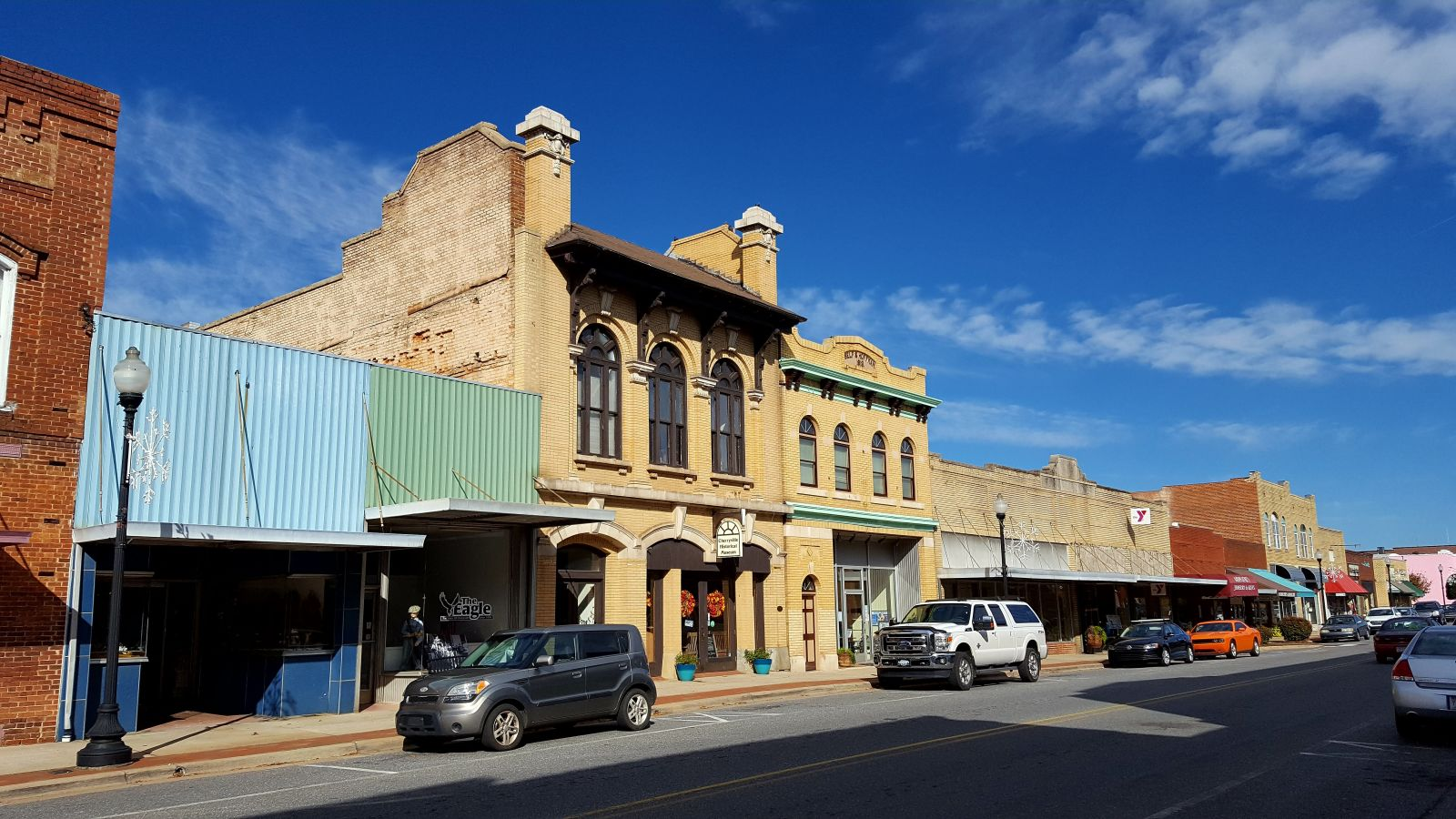
- Downtown Cherryville

- Flag Seal
- Nickname: Cville
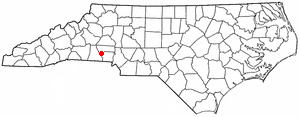
- Location in the US state of North Carolina
- Coordinates: 35°23′04″N 81°22′41″W
- Country: United States
- State: North Carolina
- County: Gaston
- Incorporated: 1881

Government
  - Mayor: Henry Lee Beam

Area
  - Total: 5.53 sq mi (14.33 km^{2})
  - Land: 5.52 sq mi (14.30 km^{2})
  - Water: 0.012 sq mi (0.03 km^{2})
- Elevation: 955 ft (291 m)

Population (2020)
  - Total: 6,078
  - Density: 1,101/sq mi (425.1/km^{2})
- Time zone: UTC−5 (Eastern (EST))
  - Summer (DST): UTC−4 (EDT)
- ZIP code: 28021
- Area code: 704
- FIPS code: 37-12340
- GNIS feature ID: 2404040
- Website: www.cityofcherryville.com

Cherryville (/ˈtʃɜr.vəl/) (Chur-vull) is a city in northwestern Gaston County, North Carolina, United States. As of the 2020 census, Cherryville had a population of 6,078. The New Year's Shooters celebrate the area's German heritage by beginning each year with a customary chant and the honorary shooting of muskets. Cherryville is located approximately 38 miles (61 km) west of Charlotte and 16 miles (26 km) northwest of Gastonia.

== Geography ==
Cherryville is located in Cherryville Township at an elevation of 1,007 feet (307 m). According to the United States Census Bureau, the city covers a total area of 5.50 square miles (14.25 km^{2}), of which 5.49 square miles (14.22 km^{2}) is land and 0.012 square miles (0.03 km^{2}), or 0.21%, is water. The small Cherryville City Reservoir is located just southeast of the city limits.

Cherryville is located along a divide among three watersheds. The western end of Cherryville is in the watershed of Muddy Creek, a right tributary of Buffalo Creek and part of the Broad River catchment basin. The north side of Cherryville is in the Indian Creek watershed, drained by Lick Fork Creek and an unnamed tributary of Indian Creek. The south side of Cherryville Township is in the Beaverdam Creek watershed, drained by unnamed right-hand tributaries of Beaverdam Creek. Indian Creek and Beaverdam Creek are tributaries of the South Fork Catawba River.

== History ==
During the last half of the 18th century, German, Dutch, and Scots-Irish families from the Colony of Pennsylvania migrated south and settled in the Cherryville area. Land grants made by King George III of Great Britain date back to 1768, and as early as 1792 Governor Samuel Ashe of North Carolina made grants in and around "White Pine", as the settlement was known at the time. A village began to develop at a crossroads of the Morganton-to-Charleston road, closely followed by modern Highway 274 / Mountain Street, and the Old Post Road, a main thoroughfare between Salisbury, North Carolina, and Spartanburg, South Carolina.

In 1862, the Wilmington, Charlotte and Rutherford Railroad (later known as the Carolina Central Railroad) reached White Pine. Construction of the railroad westward from Cherryville was interrupted by the Civil War, so that throughout the war Cherryville was a western terminus of the railroads in North Carolina. When construction resumed and the railroad extended beyond Cherryville, the town served as a water and coal stop. Along the railroad, a local resident planted cherry trees, and the train engineers soon began calling the settlement "Cherryville". The town was incorporated under this name in 1881.

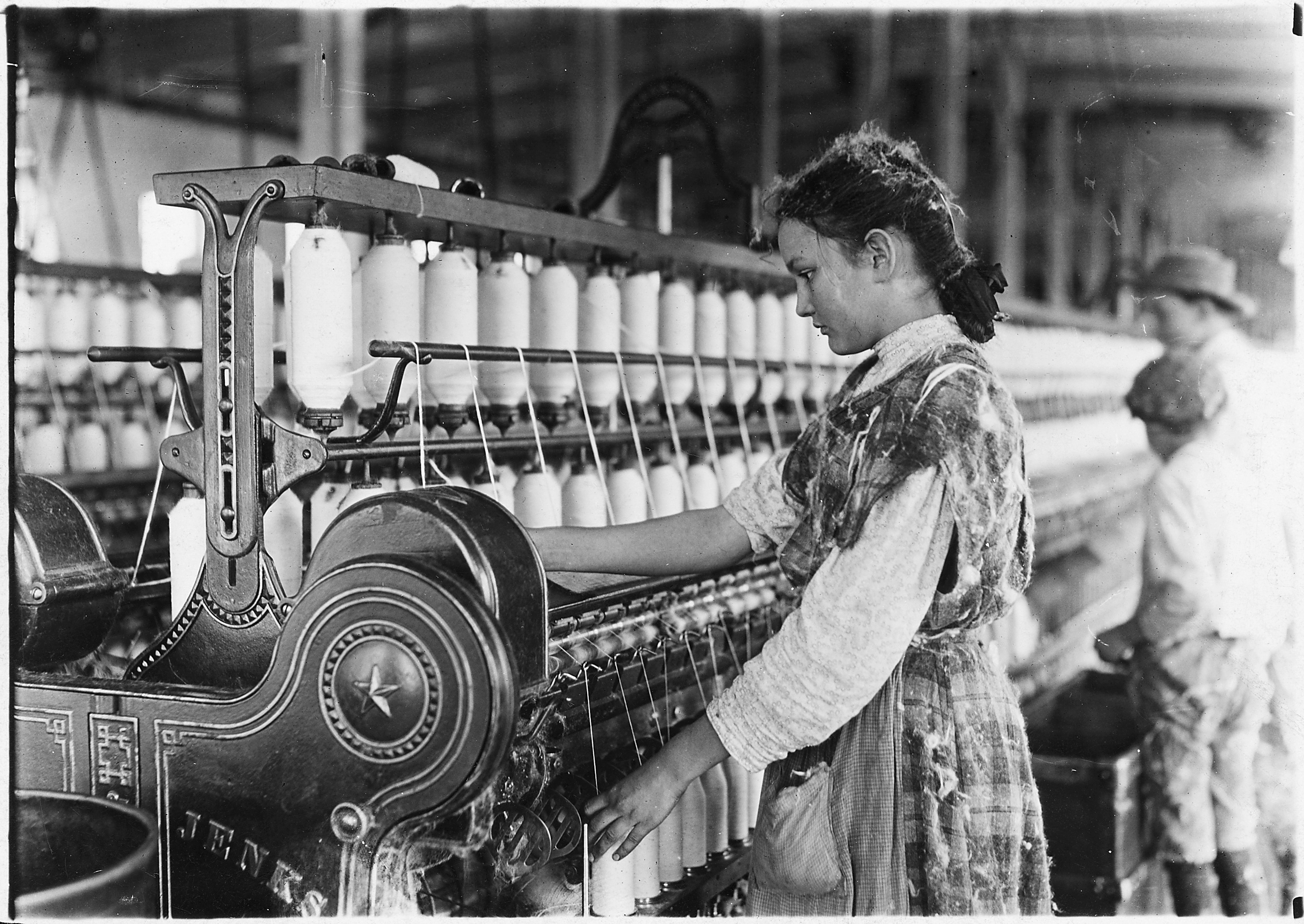
Young spinners at Vivian Cotton Mills in Cherryville. Photo by Lewis Hine, 1908.

Agriculture was Cherryville's main economic base for many years. However, during the late 19th century, the textile industry became established in the town. Cherryville's first cotton mill, the Cherryville Manufacturing Plant, was incorporated in 1891. It was soon followed by the opening of three other mills. By the start of the 20th century, the rural village had become an industrial community of a thousand people. Eventually, 13 mills would be opened in Cherryville, including Gaston Manufacturing Company (later operated as Dora Yarn Mills), Vivian Manufacturing Company ("Old Sardine", later operated as Nuway Spinning Company), Melville Manufacturing Company (later Burlington Industries' Pinnacle Plant), Howell Manufacturing Company, Rhyne Houser Manufacturing Company (later part of Burlington Industries' Madision Division), and Carlton Yarn Mills, Inc. All of these plants have since closed.

In 1932, a trucking company began operating in Cherryville with one truck hauling produce from Florida to Cherryville. This company would become one of the largest freight carriers in the nation, known as Carolina Freight Carriers Corporation. After operating for more than sixty years, Carolina Freight was bought by the Arkansas Best Trucking Company in October 1995, and operations moved from Cherryville.

On July 13, 1966, Trains #45 & #46 of the Seaboard Air Line Railroad, hit head-on on the southeast side of the city, killing one and injuring three. GP-9's 1911–1927–1963–1971–1979 and F-3, 4027 of SAL, were destroyed and scrapped on site. J. W. Pait of Hamlet, North Carolina, was killed in the wreck.

The Beam's Shell Service Station and Office was listed on the National Register of Historic Places in 1997.

== Demographics ==
Historical population
Census	Pop.	Note	%±
1900	1,008		—
1910	1,153		14.4%
1920	1,884		63.4%
1930	2,756		46.3%
1940	3,225		17.0%
1950	3,492		8.3%
1960	3,607		3.3%
1970	5,258		45.8%
1980	4,844		−7.9%
1990	4,756		−1.8%
2000	5,361		12.7%
2010	5,760		7.4%
2020	6,078		5.5%
2025 (est.)	6,523	▲	7.3%
U.S. Decennial Census

=== 2020 census ===
Cherryville racial composition
Race	Number	Percentage
White (non-Hispanic)	4,746	78.08%
Black or African American (non-Hispanic)	628	10.33%
Native American	15	0.25%
Asian	47	0.77%
Other/Mixed	239	3.93%
Hispanic or Latino	403	6.63%

As of the 2020 census, Cherryville had a population of 6,078. The median age was 43.9 years. 20.5% of residents were under the age of 18 and 22.0% of residents were 65 years of age or older. For every 100 females there were 88.3 males, and for every 100 females age 18 and over there were 83.1 males age 18 and over.

98.7% of residents lived in urban areas, while 1.3% lived in rural areas.

There were 2,442 households in Cherryville, including 1,493 families. Of all households, 29.8% had children under the age of 18 living in them, 44.3% were married-couple households, 17.9% were households with a male householder and no spouse or partner present, and 32.1% were households with a female householder and no spouse or partner present. About 31.0% of all households were made up of individuals and 15.5% had someone living alone who was 65 years of age or older.

There were 2,745 housing units, of which 11.0% were vacant. The homeowner vacancy rate was 1.1% and the rental vacancy rate was 10.3%.

=== 2000 census ===
As of the census of 2000, there were 5,361 people, 2,177 households, and 1,480 families residing in the city. The population density was 1,131.3 people per square mile (436.7 per km^{2}). There were 2,356 housing units at an average density of 497.2 per square mile (191.9 per km^{2}). The racial makeup of the city was 88.81% White, 9.57% African American, 0.13% Native American, 0.62% Asian, 0.52% from other races, and 0.35% from two or more races. Hispanic or Latino of any race were 2.29% of the population.

There were 2,177 households, out of which 27.6% had children under the age of 18 living with them, 51.6% were married couples living together, 12.5% had a female householder with no husband present, and 32.0% were non-families. 28.9% of all households were made up of individuals, and 15.6% had someone living alone who was 65 years of age or older. The average household size was 2.34 and the average family size was 2.86.

In the city, the age distribution of the population shows 21.2% under the age of 18, 6.9% from 18 to 24, 26.6% from 25 to 44, 23.3% from 45 to 64, and 21.9% who were 65 years of age or older. The median age was 41 years. For every 100 females, there were 86.1 males. For every 100 females age 18 and over, there were 82.5 males.

The median income for a household in the city was $33,054, and the median income for a family was $45,607. Males had a median income of $38,667 versus $24,828 for females. The per capita income for the city was $19,254. About 6.7% of families and 9.1% of the population were below the poverty line, including 10.5% of those under age 18 and 9.3% of those age 65 or over.

== Government ==
The mayor of Cherryville is elected by popular vote for a two-year term. The City Council is made up of four members with staggered terms. Each member is elected from one of four wards for a four-year term. Candidates are required to reside in the ward they intend to represent; however, the vote is citywide. The council appoints a full-time city manager to serve as executive officer of the city.

== Economy ==
Cherryville's largest employers include Keystone Powdered Metal Company, a manufacturer primarily of automotive parts, including bearings, valve seats, and small structural parts, employing 220 people, FleetNet America, a fleet maintenance company employing over 375 people, and Bradington-Young Furniture Company, a manufacturer of sofas, chairs, and recliners, employing 187 people. Other manufacturing companies include R-Anell Incorporated, manufacturing pre-fabricated modular homes, and Advanced Urethane Solutions, Inc., manufacturing an assortment of polyurethane products including rollers, bumpers, and

The largest among non-manufacturing employers are in the governmental, institutional, and construction sectors. The public school system employs 200 people locally, while the government offices of the City of Cherryville employ 90 people. Rutherford Electric Membership Cooperative employs 186 people. Beam Construction Company employs 150 people. Carolina Care Center and Century Care, convalescent facilities, employ 120 and 70 people, respectively.

== Education ==
Public schools in Cherryville are part of the Gaston County Schools public school system. They include:

- Cherryville Elementary School, grades K-3
- William Blaine Beam Intermediate School, grades 4–5, built in 2004 on the site of the former Cherryville High School and named for a former community leader and education advocate
- John Chavis Middle School, grades 6–8, named for John Chavis (c. 1763–1838), African-American educator and Presbyterian minister
- Cherryville High School, grades 9-12
- Tryon Elementary School, grades K-5, in the unincorporated Tryon community of Cherryville Township, also feeds into John Chavis Middle School

The Cherryville Branch of the Gaston County Public Library serves this community.

== Religious life ==
The first church organized in Cherryville was Saint John's Evangelical Lutheran Church, established in 1881, the same year in which the town was incorporated. The congregation had the first church building in Cherryville as well, erected soon after the church's organization. It was replaced by the current structure in 1963.

Other churches in Cherryville include First United Methodist Church (organized 1883), Fairview Baptist Church (1884), First Presbyterian Church (1893), First Baptist Church (1893), Rudisill Chapel AME Zion Church (1896), First Wesleyan Church (1907), Second Baptist Church (1940), First Church of the Nazarene (1950), Cherryville Church of God, North Gaston Church of God, Mount Zion Baptist Church, Cherryville Missionary Methodist Church, Iglesia Christian Integral, Victory Life Assembly of God, Macedonia Missionary Baptist Church, Liberty United Glorious Church, Shady Grove Baptist Church, and Oak Grove Baptist Church.

== Places of interest ==
The Cherryville Historical Museum preserves the history of the Cherryville area, and is open to the public each week during specified days. The C. Grier Beam Truck Museum, interpreting the history of freight trucking and Carolina Freight Carriers, is in the former Beam's Shell Service Station and Office, 117 N. Mountain St., and is listed on the National Register of Historic Places. The 1922 Noah Benjamin Kendrick House at 402 N. Mountain Street is a Designated Gaston County Historic Property. Recreational sites in Cherryville include the semi-private Cherryville Country Club, with a nine-hole golf course, on the northeast side of town.

Rudisill Stadium, completed in 1963 and located on the campus of Beam Intermediate School, is the largest sports venue in Cherryville and is used for several community events throughout the year.

== Fire protection ==
Cherryville Fire Department (city limits of Cherryville), Hugh's Pond Volunteer Fire Department (unincorporated areas on the North/NorthWest side of town), Tryonota Volunteer Fire Department (unincorporated areas on the South/South East side of town).

== Notable people ==
- Debbie Clary (born 1959), North Carolina General Assembly member who served in both the House and Senate positions
- Tony Cloninger (1940–2018), former Major League Baseball starting pitcher with the Milwaukee Braves, Cincinnati Reds, and St. Louis Cardinals
- Fred Durst (born 1970), American singer, rapper, songwriter, actor, and film director
- Trentavis Friday (born 1995), track and field athlete specializing in sprinting events
- Patrick McHenry (born 1975), member of the U.S. House of Representatives
- Jack Tatum (1948–2010), former NFL player with the Oakland Raiders and Houston Oilers
- George Wilson (1925–1974), former Major League Baseball outfielder
