= ABF Freight System =

American trucking company

ABF Freight System, Inc.
- Formerly: OK Transfer (1923–1935); Arkansas Motor Freight (1935–1956); Arkansas Best Freight System (from 1956)
- Type: Subsidiary
- Industry: Transportation
- Founded: 1923; 103 years ago, in Fort Smith, Arkansas
- Headquarters: Fort Smith, Arkansas, United States
- Key people: Seth Runser (president and CEO)
- Parent: ArcBest (1996-present)
- Website: abf.com

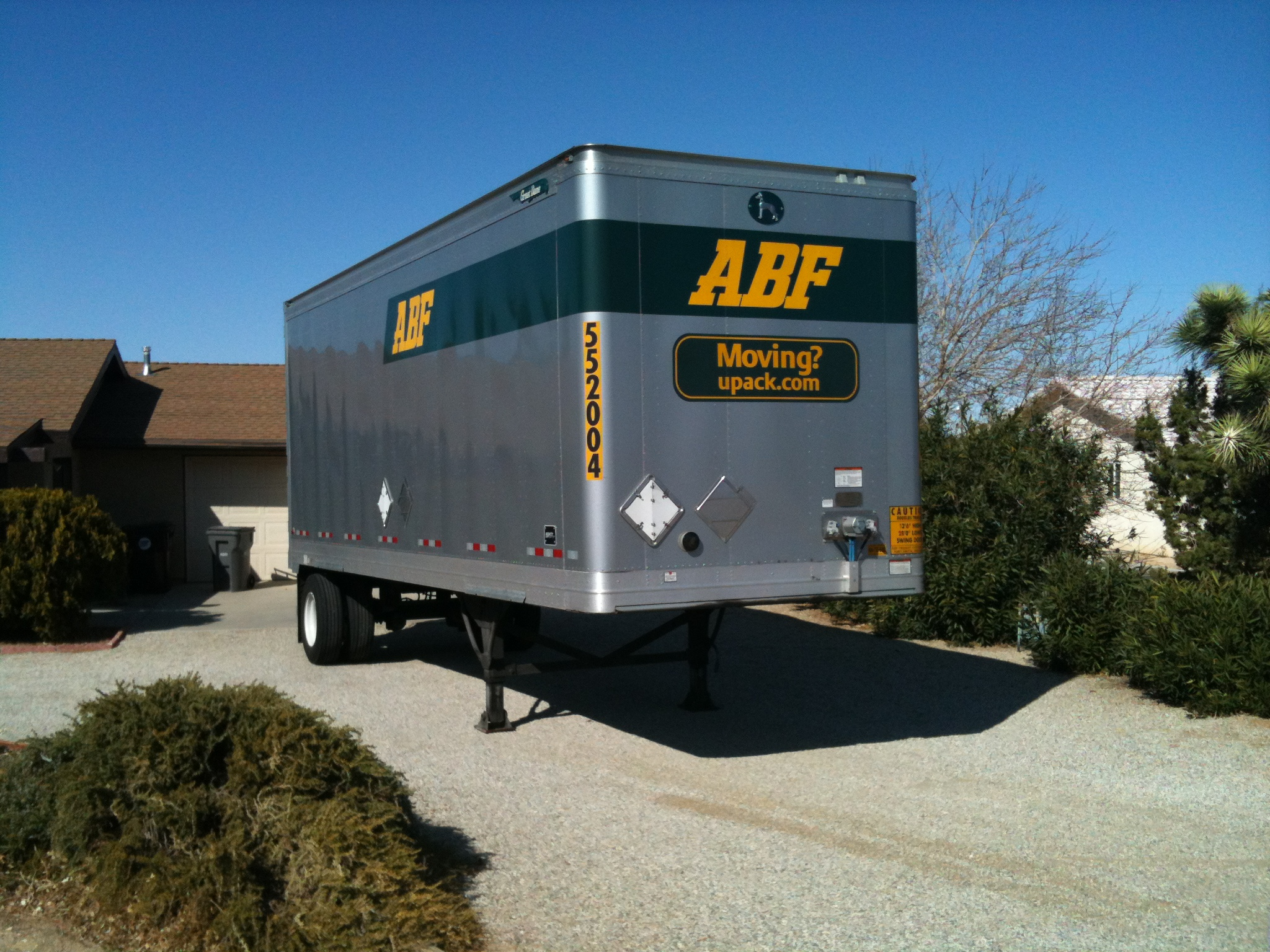
ABF Freight trailer

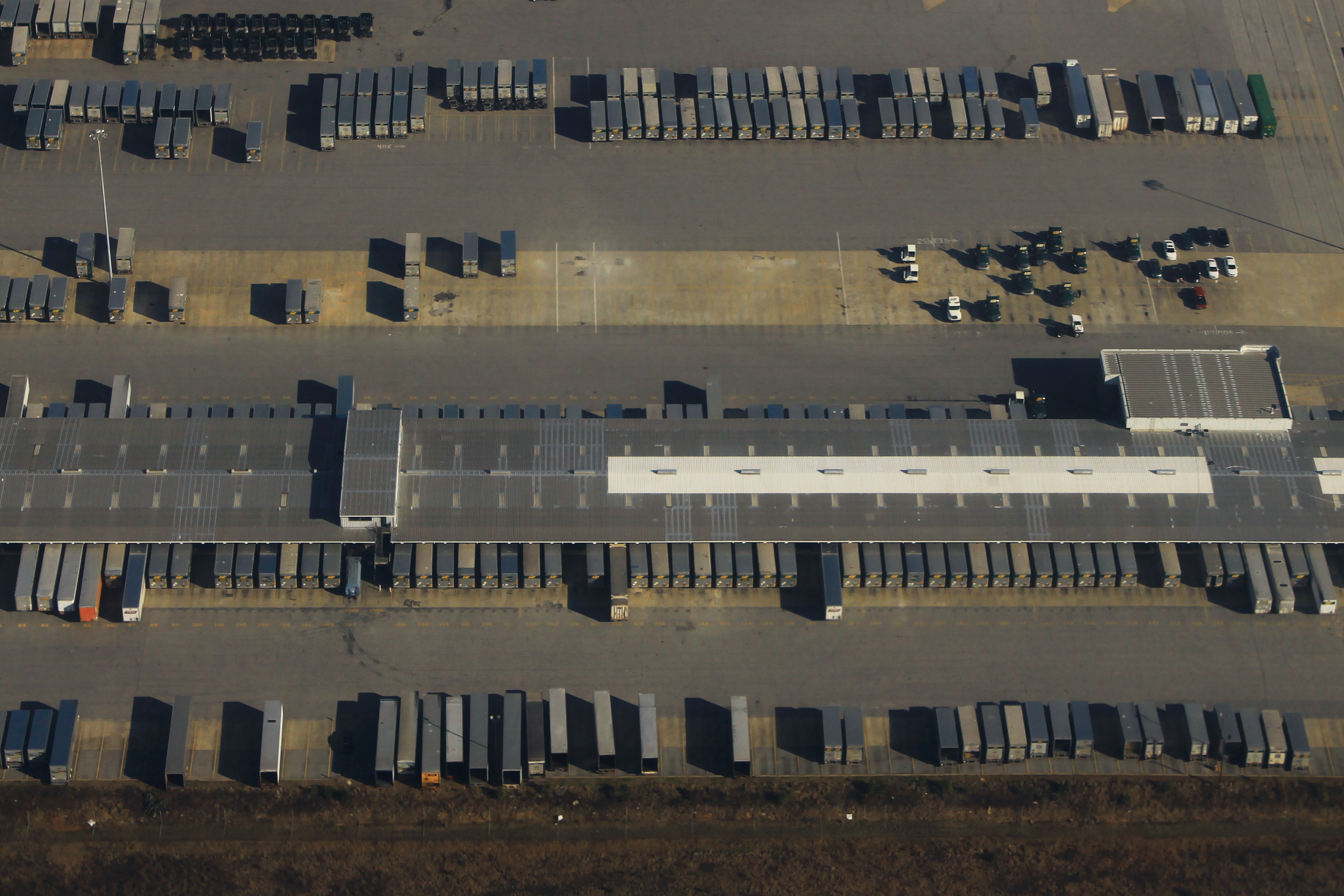
ABF Freight warehouse in Atlanta

ABF Freight System, Inc. is an American national less-than-truckload (LTL) freight carrier based in Fort Smith, Arkansas, that is a subsidiary of ArcBest.

== History ==
The company was founded in Fort Smith, Arkansas in 1923 as OK Transfer, the name it used until 1935 when it acquired Arkansas Motor Freight (AMF) and took that company's name. Until 1935, it had operated only within Arkansas but its acquisition of Motor Express made it an interstate carrier.

Former lawyer Robert A. Young, Jr. purchased Arkansas Motor Freight Lines, Inc. in 1951. The company name changed again when, after Young acquired Dallas, Texas-based Best Motor Freight in 1956, he merged the two companies in 1957 as Arkansas-Best Freight System Inc.

Arkansas-Best again expanded in 1961 when it acquired Healzer Cartage of Kansas City, Missouri for US$500,000. Healzer had been founded in 1930 in Hutchinson, Kansas and at the time of acquisition reported nearly US$3 million annually in revenue. It was expected to operate as a wholly owned subsidiary of Arkansas-Best. At the time, Arkansas-Best estimated it would have revenues of approximately US$18 million for 1961. Arkansas-Best also acquired Delta Motor Line expanding its reach to New Orleans.

In 1966, Young founded Arkansas Best Corporation as a holding company for Arkansas-Best to facilitate diversification.

In 1968, after a decade of expansion by acquiring route authorities in the southern, midwestern, and eastern US, Arkansas-Best acquired Fast Freight Co. which extended their network into New York. This was followed the next year by the acquisition of Krema Truck Lines in the Chicago area.

In the 1970s, Arkansas-Best developed into a nationwide carrier through acquisitions of southeastern US carrier Youngblood Truck Lines in 1971 and all or part of H.A. Day Truck Line, Associated Transport, Western Gillette, and a portion of the routes of Great Lakes Express Co. which expanded its midwestern operations. The subsequent acquisition of the operating rights of Akers Motor Lines along U.S. Route 1 connected Arkansas-Best's New England and southeastern operations. Major expansion came with the carrier's purchase of Navajo Freight Lines in 1979. This pushed Arkansas-Best's operations all the way to California and increased its rank from the 25th largest interstate motor freight carrier in the US to ninth.

Arkansas-Best changed its name to ABF Freight System Inc. in 1980 and, by 1981, was the eighth largest trucking company in the US operating 106 terminals. It acquired East Texas Motor Freight Lines, a subsidiary of Bright Industries Inc., in 1982, a move which added 44 new terminal cities increasing ABF's reach to a total of 158, and by 1985 ABF was the sixth largest carrier in the US.

ABF created ABF U-Pack Moving as a subsidiary in 1997 to provide household moving services.

Parent company, Arkansas Best Corporation, was renamed ArcBest Corporation in 2014.
