= Highland School of Technology =

American public school in North Carolina

Location
- 1600 North Morris St; Gastonia, North Carolina 28052; United States; 35°16′49″N 81°11′26″W

Information
- Type: Public Magnet
- Motto: "A world class school educating world class students"
- Established: 2000 (26 years ago)
- School district: Gaston County Schools
- Category: Magnet school
- CEEB code: 341450
- Principal: Susan Redmond
- Staff: 38.75 (FTE)
- Enrollment: 538 (2024–2025)
- Student to teacher ratio: 13.88
- Colors: Royal blue and gold
- Team name: Rams
- Rivals: Bessemer City High School; Cherryville High School
- Website: highland.gaston.k12.nc.us

== Description ==
Highland School of Technology is a magnet public high school located in Gastonia, North Carolina, United States. It is the first magnet school available to students in the Gaston County Schools public school district and draws students from each of the other nine high schools in the district. The percentage of students at Highland from a particular feeder high school is equal to the overall percentage of that school's students in the district. Students are selected through a lottery among qualified 8th-grade applicants.

The school opened to freshmen and sophomores in the 2000 school year. The first graduating class was in 2003.

== Athletics ==
For women's sports, Highland participates in cheer, tennis, soccer, softball, cross country, track and field, swim, volleyball, basketball, tennis, and golf. For men's sports, Highland participates in cheer, tennis, soccer, baseball, cross country, track and field, swim, football, basketball, tennis, and golf.

Highland has a notorious record for being subpar in athletics, at one point losing 34 straight games in football. Jimmy White is the current football head coach, and also a former alumni.

== Principals ==
Highland School of Technology has had five principals: David Baldaia, who was the school's inaugural principal, but he left without serving a year to start Phillip O. Berry Academy of Technology in Charlotte-Mecklenburg Schools system.

Lee Dedmon, UNC' NIT Championship Center "6 foot 11 and 3/4" became the principal in 2001 and remained active until July 1, 2013, when he retired to join the county school board and was succeeded by Denise McLean as principal of Highland. McLean had at one time served as Dedmon's assistant principal at HST. Josh Allen served as her assistant principal.

On June 27, 2019, James Montgomery was assigned by the school board to become principal for the 2019–20 school year. Elizabeth Leonard served as assistant principal until 2022.

On December 18, 2023, former HST assistant principal Susan Redmond was assigned by the school board to become principal on January 1, 2024, in the wake of Mr. Montgomery's retirement. Jenny Carper serves as assistant principal beginning with the 2022–23 school year. Cheryl Houston-Word serves as athletic director.

== Faculty ==
Beginning in 2010, there is only one English language arts (ELA) teacher per grade, meaning all students have the same 4 ELA teachers.

== Campus and facilities ==
Highland School was remodeled from the former Highland Junior High School. The new configuration of the hallways has three hallways, a gymnasium, and a football field. The halls are labeled A, B and C, and are quasi-sorted by career-technical academy. For example, the A hall has all of the medical classrooms, such as the dental lab located in the vicinity. There are two commons areas: Medford Commons, in which all students congregate and socialize before going to classrooms, and Times Square, where the halls meet.

== Vocational academies ==
Each student enters the school as a member of one of the three academies. Within each academy there are various pathways available for the students, each with its own sequence of required courses. The three academies offered are (effective for the Class of 2015):

- Business, Legal Studies, & Information Sciences
- Health Sciences
- Manufacturing and Engineering/Graphics
