= Webb Street School =

American public school in North Carolina

Location
- 1623 North Webb Street; Gastonia, North Carolina 28052; United States
- Coordinates: 35°15′50″N 81°12′43″W

Information
- School district: Gaston County Schools
- Category: Public School
- Principal: Kelli Howe
- Mascot: Spiders
- Website: www.gaston.k12.nc.us/webbst

Webb Street School is a public school in the Gaston County Schools school district and is located in Gastonia, North Carolina, United States. Webb Street serves students ages 5–22 with intellectual disabilities. The school's instructional program follows the North Carolina Standard Course of Study. In addition, students are instructed within Gaston County through the Community Based Training program. The current principal is Kelli Howe.
