= ArcBest =

American transportation holding company

ArcBest Corporation
- Type: Public
- Traded as: Nasdaq: ARCB; S&P 600 Component
- Industry: Transportation
- Founded: 1966; 60 years ago in Fort Smith, Arkansas
- Founder: Robert A. Young
- Headquarters: Fort Smith, Arkansas, United States
- Key people: Seth Runser president, and CEO)
- Revenue: ▼US$4.01 billion (2025)
- Net income: ▼US$60.1 million (2025)
- Subsidiaries: ABF Freight System, Panther Premium Logistics, FleetNet America, MoLo Solutions, U-Pack
- Website: arcb.com

ArcBest Corporation is an American holding company for truckload and less-than-truckload (LTL) freight, freight brokerage, household good moving, and transportation management companies. Historically, the company also owned furniture, banking, and other diverse subsidiaries. The company ranked fifteenth among for-hire carriers in the US for 2020 according to industry journal Transport Topics.

== History ==
The company was formed in 1966 as Arkansas Best Corporation by Robert A. Young, owner of LTL carrier Arkansas-Best Freight System (now ABF Freight System), to be that carrier's holding company as a way to facilitate diversification. Young remained the company's chairman until his death in 1973. In the 1960s, the company acquired Healzer Cartage Company, Delta Motor Line and others.

Arkansas Best Corp. went public on the NYSE as "ABZ" in 1972. At the time, in addition to Arkansas-Best Freight System, it also owned Riverside Furniture Corporation, the National Bank of Commerce of Dallas, Texas, Data-Tronic Corporation, and Arkansas Bandag Corporation. In 1978, the company acquired Navajo Freight Lines. In 1988, the company was the subject of a hostile takeover which resulted in a leveraged buyout to take the company private. It went public again, this time on the Nasdaq, in 1992.

ABF acquired financially troubled Worldway Corp. and its subsidiaries Carolina Freight Carriers Corp., G.I. Trucking Co., Red Arrow Freight Lines Inc., Cardinal Freight Carriers Inc., Innovative Logistics Inc., and CaroTrans International Inc. in 1995 for US$72.2 million. G.I. Trucking was subsequently sold in 2001 into joint ownership of a group of G.I. senior management and LTL carrier Estes Express Lines and was fully acquired by Estes in 2005. Further acquisitions by ABF in the 2010s included Albert Moving in 2011 and Panther Expedited for US$180 million in 2012. In 2013, it created ABF Logistics.

In 2014, Arkansas Best was renamed ArcBest Corporation. This was followed in 2015 by the acquisition of Smart Lines Transportation Group and Bear Transportation Services and in 2016 by the acquisition of Logistics & Distribution Services. Also in 2016, the company reorganized rebranding many of its services under the name ArcBest.

In 2021, ArcBest acquired MoLo Solutions, a truckload brokerage company based in Chicago. The deal was priced at US$235 million upfront and up to an additional US$215 million if MoLo hits certain revenue benchmarks by 2025. ArcBest intended to merge MoLo's operations and its existing brokerage operations onto a single platform.

In July 2025, ArcBest announced that CEO Judy McReynolds would be retiring at the end of the year and replacing her would be current president Seth Runser.

== Operations ==
As of June 2021, ArcBest and its subsidiaries operated over 240 facilities in North America. The company ranked fifteenth on Transport Topics Top 100 For-Hire carriers list for 2020 with over 4,000 company-owned tractors, over 22,000 trailers, and 83 straight trucks in its fleet.

The company reports its revenue in two segments: asset-based (which consists of ABF Freight) and asset-light (all other operations).

== Subsidiaries ==
=== ABF Freight ===
ABF Freight is a unionized truckload and LTL freight company based in Fort Smith and is ArcBest's largest subsidiary representing about US$2 billion of ArcBest's approximately US$3 billion revenue in 2019.

=== ABF U-Pack ===
U-Pack is a household goods moving brand of ABF created in 1997. Since 2014, it has operated as a part of ABF Moving which itself is part of ABF Logistics.

=== Panther Premium Logistics ===
Panther is a non-asset carrier based in Seville, Ohio, founded in 1992 which was acquired by ArcBest in 2012. At the time of acquisition, Panther Expedited Services was the second-largest US expedited carrier behind FedEx Custom Critical. The company was renamed Panther Premium Logistics in 2014.

=== ArcBest Technologies ===
Originally Data-Tronics Corp., the company was renamed ArcBest Technologies in 2014.

=== MoLo Solutions ===
MoLo is a Chicago-based truckload freight brokerage company acquired by ArcBest in 2021.
