= Cherryville High School =

American public school in North Carolina

Location
- 313 Ridge Avenue; Cherryville, North Carolina 28021; United States
- 35°23′22″N 81°22′48″W

Information
- School district: Gaston County Schools
- Category: Public
- CEEB code: 340715
- Principal: Mitch Allen
- Teaching staff: 32.97 (FTE)
- Grades: 9–12
- Enrollment: 484 (2024–2025)
- Student to teacher ratio: 14.68
- Colors: Royal blue and white
- Team name: Ironmen
- Rivals: Bessemer City; Highland
- Website: cherryvillehigh.gaston.k12.nc.us

Cherryville High School is a high school in the Gaston County Schools public school district located in Cherryville, NC. Its attendance area covers northwestern Gaston County, and it also serves the western part of the community of Tryon and the surrounding rural area. Mitch Allen currently serves as principal. Heather Parrish serves as assistant principal. Matthew Powers serves as athletic director. The feeder middle school is Chavis.

== History ==
=== Early history ===
The town's first public, permanent school building was constructed in 1892 on land donated by Mr. W.R. Carroll and Mr. M.L. Dellinger. It was located west/southwest of downtown, very near the intersection of West Academy Street and Dixie Streets in Cherryville and was a rectangular frame building with two floors and a front bell tower. The new building, facing east, was called The Cherryville Academy and was utilized for about 25 years until a much larger brick building was constructed in 1915 on East First Street.

In 1902 the Cherryville Township voted to levy a special tax against its citizens to publicly maintain a graded school, including the introduction of a high school. In the fall of 1908, the Cherryville Academy School officially passed the state requirements for graduating students following 11 years of formal instruction. It achieved this significant milestone, as a "North Carolina state high school", under the administration of Principal J.W. Strassell.

=== The Academy ===
The "Academy", which was abandoned in 1915 for the new brick structure, was significant because it heralded the first graduating class from Cherryville Schools: two girls and four boys.

=== Growth ===
In June 1915 the town bought a five-acre tract of land on the north side of First Street between Pink and Depot Streets for $1,450 from Mr. Joseph Black. A new three-story brick school was erected, housing 19 classrooms for both elementary and high school students and a large auditorium.

With the construction of another brick two-story school building ("Elementary Number 2 School"; later "West School") in 1925 the First Street location became home to Cherryville High School (CHS). In 1927 a modern gymnasium was completed on the school campus.

The Great Depression of 1929 impacted the Cherryville City School System. Early victims were the home economics' department and the public school music teacher position, which were not reinstituted until 1931.

In 1936 a third, large, two-story brick building was constructed on the east portion of the original five-acre tract bought in 1915. The older school (constructed in 1915) became home to the first seven grades as was renamed "Elementary Number 1 School".

=== The 1940s ===
Significant curriculum changes advanced Cherryville High School through the 1940s. By 1943 the nine-month school year was incepted, increasing annual school days from 160 to 180. A 12th grade was added to the high school in the fall of 1945 and the ninth grade officially became the first year of the high school program.

Cherryville City Schools Superintendent Foster W. Starnes devoted much effort to the erection of large, modern auditorium in 1949 at a cost of $125,000, which was subsequently named in honor of Starnes. The same year a vocational wing was added to the east side of the high school building to accommodate home economics, agricultural and shop instruction.

The spring of 1947 marked the first graduating class, having completed 12 years of formal instruction. The class of 1950 was the first to hold commencement exercises in the new F. W. Starnes Auditorium.

=== The 1950s ===
The early 1950s bolstered the Cherryville tradition of community involvement in and support of the high school: Cherryville High School met requirements to become a member of the Southern Association of Colleges and Schools in 1951. The Cherryville Woman's Club made a donation towards additional equipment for the library. In 1952 a CHS Parent-Teacher Association was formed.

Also in 1952 a new high school classroom addition was constructed, specific for the business and commercial instruction department at CHS. This building, immediately to the west of Starnes Auditorium, now houses part of Cherryville's W. Blaine Beam Intermediate School.

In 1955, the Cherryville City Schools administration approved construction of a physical education building with a large gymnasium, shower rooms and a weight room. This facility was dedicated as the "Joe R. Nixon Physical Education Building" in January, 1956, Mr. Nixon being a former superintendent of the Cherryville City School System. A student common area was created between the Starnes Auditorium and the planned cafeteria. A vocational department for bricklaying and shop was added to the basement area of the Joe R. Nixon Physical Education Building.

=== The 1960s ===
In the early 1960s, Superintendent William H. Brown appealed to the Cherryville citizens and succeeded in levying, by public vote, a fifteen-cent tax increase to support the Cherryville City School System.

In 1961 construction was completed on two additions at the CHS Campus: a free-standing high school cafeteria at corner of Pink Street and East First Street and the "Instrumental and Choral Music Building", attached to the north side of Starnes Auditorium.

The Rudisill Memorial Football Stadium was built at a cost of $78,000 and was dedicated September 6, 1963. The Rudisill Foundation, created by C. A. Rudisill, contributed funding to build the brick stadium on the north-north/east portion of the CHS Campus. The Cherryville citizens matched the Rudisill's contributions. The stadium was named in honor of Mr. and Mrs. Carl Rudisill and their son and his wife. In 2012 the stadium was demolished after an engineering study revealed permanent damage to its structure.

In 1966 John Chavis High, which had graduated Cherryville's African-American children for thirty-plus years, was integrated with Cherryville High School. It was the first school in Gaston County to fully integrate grades 10 through 12. Harvey Lee Patterson was the first black student who entered CHS in 1965 and he graduated with honors, as Class Salutatorian in 1969.

In 1968 the citizens of Gaston County narrowly voted in favor of abolishing the Cherryville City School System and absorbing it into the Gaston County School System, creating the "Gaston County Consolidated School System." The Cherryville citizens voted against the consolidation effort with 900 votes. Only 9 votes in Cherryville were recorded as "in favor" of consolidation.

=== 1968 referendum ===
In the same 1968 referendum, a separate bond package was offered to the county citizenry to build new high schools in each quadrant of Gaston County. That package passed as well.

As part of the strategy for school construction, the new administration of the Consolidated Gaston County Schools proposed to combine Cherryville High School and Bessemer City High School into a single "Northwest High School". It would be constructed midway between Cherryville and Bessemer City, near the Tryon Elementary School on State Highway 274, just south of Cherryville.

Both communities were opposed to the consolidation and developed legal positions against the consolidated high school, funded by contributions. The most prominent opposition was organized as "SOS" or "Save our School", originating within the Cherryville community. Mr. Howell Stroup, a long-time civic leader in Cherryville, led this organization. Even with significant hostility voiced by both Cherryville and Bessemer City citizens, the Consolidated Gaston County School Board of Education voted in favor of moving ahead with the proposed Northwest High School.

For the next several years, the Cherryville / Bessemer City consolidation effort was blocked by several on-going lawsuits and through the backing of Mr. Howell Stroup of Cherryville, a member of the school board.

In 1976, Dr. Bud Black was elected County Commissioner, representing the Cherryville Township and Gene Carson was elected County Commissioner representing the Crowders Mountain Township, Gaston County, North Carolina. Dr. Black led the effort along with Carson to seek consensus among the commission to permanently eliminate funding for construction of the Northwest High School. Black convinced the Gaston County Commissioners to hold meetings in the northwest area of Gaston County to hear the voice of the people involved in the consolidation of Cherryville High School and Bessemer City High School. The Board of Commissioners finally unanimously agreed to have these meetings. The only support for the a new consolidated high school came from the people in the Tryon School district because the Gaston County School Board had promised these people in closing Tryon High School that the new Northwest High School would be built in the Tryon School district. The Gaston County School Board immediately purchased the land for the Northwest High School near the Tryon School after telling the people of the Tryon School district that the Northwest High School would be built in their district.

Almost 10 years after the first public vote, the Gaston County Board of County Commissioners held public hearings in Cherryville, Tryon School district, and Bessemer City to gauge support for the proposed Northwest High School. Following these public hearings, with overwhelming opposition still against the proposed merger, Dr Black fostered the within the Gaston County Commissioners and Consolidated Gaston County Board of Education to maintain Cherryville High School and Bessemer City High School as separate entities.

In tandem Black and other citizens demanded that funding be made available to replace the antiquated 1936 CHS building, still in use at that time. Funding was approved and by 1981 a new CHS building was added to the existing Cherryville Junior High School, located on Ridge Avenue. The school was constructed in the same circular fashion as the junior high building, giving it an aerial look of a reel-to-reel movie projector.

== Cherryville High School Education Foundation ==
Prompted by cutbacks in funding from the state and county resources, in November 2010, a group of CHS alumni and friends of the school established the non-profit Cherryville High School Education Foundation.

The CHSEF is independent of CHS and Gaston County and state education bodies. Fifteen board members, predominately CHS alumni, manage the Foundation. Grants are awarded exclusively to Cherryville High each year based on specific criteria, aligning with the Foundation's mission and objectives. As of spring 2012, the Foundation surpassed an initial fundraising goal of $50,000.

== CHS Music Department ==
The first marching/concert band for the school system was organized in 1913.

== Athletics ==
Cherryville High School is a member of the North Carolina High School Athletic Association (NCHSAA).

== Notable alumni ==
- Stan Crisson – former Canadian Football League player
- Trentavis Friday – track and field athlete specializing in sprinting events, USA men's high school record holder in the 100 metres
- George Wilson – former MLB outfielder, 1956 World Series champion with the New York Yankees
