= Hawthorne Academy of Health Sciences =

American public school in North Carolina

Location
- 1411 Hawthorne Lane; Charlotte, North Carolina 28205; United States
- Coordinates: 35°13′43″N 80°48′53″W

Information
- Type: Public
- Established: 2006 (20 years ago)
- CEEB code: 340662
- Principal: Sharon Bracey
- Teaching staff: 15.60 (FTE)
- Enrollment: 253 (2023-2024)
- Student to teacher ratio: 16.22
- Colors: Red, white, and black
- Mascot: Hawk
- Website: hawthorneae.cmsk12.org

Hawthorne Academy of Health Sciences is a high school in the Belmont community of Charlotte, North Carolina. The school existed in many forms before becoming CMS's first medical magnet program designed for a student capacity of 600–800. Renovation of the original buildings, constructed between the 1940s and 1960s, was completed in 2015 by Morris-Berg Architects of Charlotte.

U.S. News & World Report ranked Hawthorne 36th for high schools within North Carolina. Students have the opportunity to take Advanced Placement® coursework and exams. The AP® participation rate at Hawthorne High is 93%. The total minority enrollment is 88%, and 58% of students are economically disadvantaged. Hawthorne High is 1 of 35 high schools in the Charlotte-Mecklenburg Schools.

== History ==
Hawthorne Academy, before the Health Science program, was a drop-out prevention school. The Dolly Tate Day Care Center, a program once offered, allowed students to have their children looked after while they attended to their studies. This program was phased out as the Health Science program was introduced. Before this, Hawthorne was a neighborhood middle school, and before that, its status is unknown. However, students from the shuttered Midwood High School were said to have moved over to Hawthorne sometime in the past, but this is unconfirmed. Midwood High's building is now home to a religious organization.

The school made headlines in 2021 after suspending a 15-year-old girl for filing a sexual assault complaint against a male student and forcing her to attend a "Sexual Assault is Preventable" program. Even after reporting the sexual assault to Charlotte police and the police pressing charges on the male student, the school still punished the student. The academy's principal and assistant principal were later suspended with pay following their handling of the situation, as well as being revealed to force the student to sign an NDA to prevent the allegations from coming out.
