= Bessemer City High School (North Carolina) =

American public school in North Carolina

Location
- 119 Yellow Jacket Lane; Bessemer City, North Carolina 28016; United States
- 35°17′50″N 81°16′53″W

Information
- Type: Public
- School district: Gaston County Schools
- CEEB code: 340330
- Principal: Doneen Johnson
- Teaching staff: 31.55 (FTE)
- Grades: 9–12
- Enrollment: 548 (2023–2024)
- Student to teacher ratio: 17.37
- Colors: Green and yellow
- Team name: Yellow Jackets
- Rivals: Cherryville High School, Highland School of Technology
- Website: bessemercityhigh.gaston.k12.nc.us

Bessemer City High School is a high school in the Gaston County Schools school district located in Bessemer City, NC. Its attendance range covers the central part of western Gaston County, and it also serves the eastern portion of the community of Tryon, parts of north western Gastonia, and the surrounding rural area. Doneen Johnson serves as principal, and Billy James serves as athletic director The feeder school is Bessemer City Middle School.

== Notable alumni ==
- Phillip Crosby, former NFL fullback
- Kevin Millwood, former MLB pitcher, All-Star selection in 1999 and AL ERA leader in 2005
- Jimmy Wayne, country music singer and songwriter
