= Forestview High School =

American public school in North Carolina

Location
- 5545 Union Road; Gastonia, North Carolina 28056; United States; 35°10′59″N 81°08′08″W

Information
- Type: Public
- Established: 1998 (28 years ago)
- School district: Gaston County Schools
- CEEB code: 341449
- NCES School ID: 370162002384
- Principal: Tammy Mims
- Teaching staff: 62.19 (on an FTE basis)
- Grades: 9–12
- Enrollment: 1,133 (2024-2025)
- Student to teacher ratio: 18.22
- Colors: Silver and black
- Mascot: Jaguars
- Nickname: Jaguars
- Website: gaston.k12.nc.us/forestview

Forestview High School is a public high school in Gastonia, North Carolina, United States. It is part of the Gaston County Schools district. Tammy Mims is the current principal and Brian Horne is the current athletic director.

== History ==
Forestview opened its doors to students in August 1998, with its first senior class graduating in 2000.

== Athletics ==
Forestview High School's team name is the Jaguars. The school colors are silver and black. Sports offered at Forestview include:

- Baseball
- Basketball
- Cross Country
- Football
- Golf
- Soccer
- Softball
- Swimming
- Tennis
- Indoor/Outdoor Track & Field
- Volleyball
- Wrestling

== Notable alumni ==
- Harold Varner III, professional golfer on the PGA Tour
