= Gaston County Schools =

School district in North Carolina, United States

Location
- 943 Osceola Street; Gastonia, North Carolina 28054 Gaston County, North Carolina

District information
- Motto: "Shaping Our Future"
- Superintendent: Dr. Morgen A. Houchard
- Accreditations: Southern Association of Colleges and Schools
- Schools: 56

Students and staff
- Students: 30,046
- Teachers: 1,950
- Staff: 3,800

Other information
- Website: www.gaston.k12.nc.us

Gaston County Schools is an American public school district in Gaston County, North Carolina. With 30,046 students enrolled in 56 schools as of the 2021–22 academic year, it is the tenth largest public school district in North Carolina.

The district covers the entire county.

== Schools ==
The system is made up of 56 schools: 11 high schools, 11 middle schools, 32 elementary schools, and three special schools including the district's Gaston Virtual Academy.

== School directory ==
=== High schools (9–12) ===
- Ashbrook High School, Gastonia
- Bessemer City High School, Bessemer City
- Cherryville High School, Cherryville
- East Gaston High School, Mount Holly
- Forestview High School, Gastonia
- Gaston Early College High School, Dallas
- Gaston Early College of Medical Sciences High School, Dallas
- Highland School of Technology, Gastonia
- Hunter Huss High School, Gastonia
- North Gaston High School, Dallas
- South Point High School, Belmont
- Stuart W. Cramer High School, Belmont

=== Middle schools (6–8) ===
- Belmont Middle School, Belmont
- Bessemer City Middle School, Bessemer City
- Cramerton Middle School, Cramerton
- Holbrook Middle School, Lowell
- John Chavis Middle School, Cherryville
- Mount Holly Middle School, Mount Holly
- Southwest Middle School, Gastonia
- Stanley Middle School, Stanley
- W. C. Friday Middle School, Dallas
- W. P. Grier Middle School, Gastonia
- York Chester Middle School, Gastonia

=== Elementary schools ===
- Beam Intermediate School
- Belmont Central Elementary School
- Bessemer City Central Elementary School
- Bessemer City Primary School
- Brookside Elementary School
- Carr Elementary School
- Catawba Heights Elementary School
- Chapel Grove Elementary School
- Cherryville Elementary School
- Costner Elementary School
- Gardner Park Elementary School
- H.H. Beam Elementary School
- Hawks Nest STEAM Academy
- Kiser Elementary School
- Lingerfeldt Elementary School
- Lowell Elementary School
- McAdenville Elementary School
- New Hope Elementary School
- North Belmont Elementary School
- Page Primary School
- Pinewood Elementary School
- Pleasant Ridge Elementary School
- Rankin Elementary School
- Robinson Elementary School
- Sadler Elementary School
- Sherwood Elementary School
- Springfield Elementary School
- Tryon Elementary School
- W.A. Bess Elementary School
- Woodhill Elementary School

=== Special schools ===
- Gaston Virtual Academy (K-12)
- Warlick Academy
- Webb Street School
