= Bradley Station =

Bus station in Gastonia, North Carolina

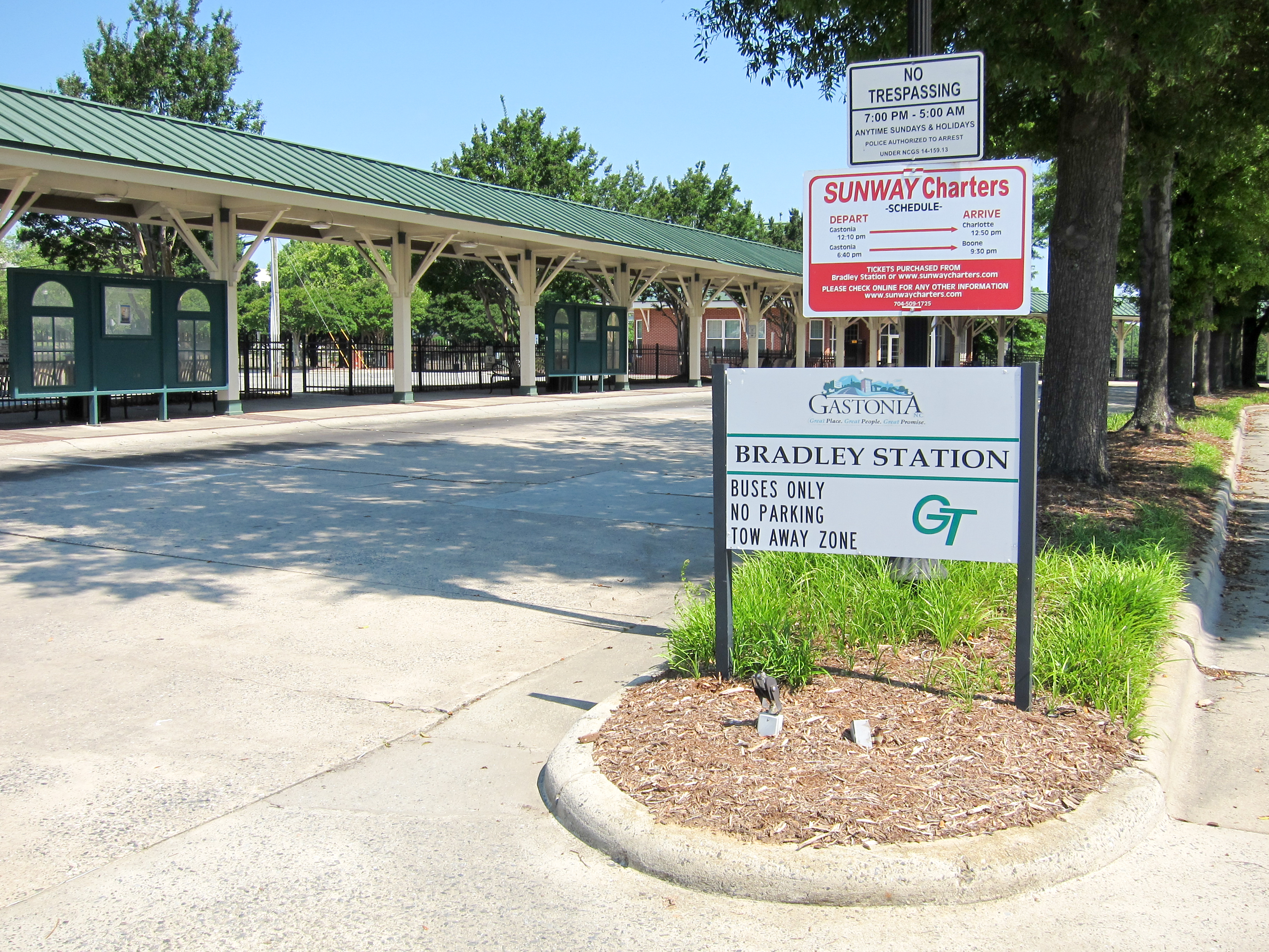
- Bradley Station in 2022

General information
- Location: 121 North Oakland Street; Gastonia, North Carolina; United States
- Coordinates: 35.26457°N 81.18026°W
- Owner: City of Gastonia
- Bus operators: GT
- Connections: CATS; Sunway Charters; Greyhound Lines

Construction
- Structure type: At-grade
- Parking: 140 spaces
- Cycle facilities: Bicycle racks
- Accessible: Yes

History
- Opened: 1994
Location

Bradley Station is the main bus station in Gastonia, North Carolina, United States. It is the hub for local bus service Gastonia Transit, and serves as the Gastonia stop for intercity services provided by Greyhound and Sunway Charters, and commuter services to Charlotte operated by Charlotte Area Transit System. The station is distinct from the Gastonia Amtrak station, which is located approximately 1 mile (1.6 km) east. Bradley Station opened in 1994, as an adaptive reuse of an existing building constructed in 1980.

== Location ==
The facility is located at the intersection of Main and Oakland streets in the Downtown Gastonia Historic District; several of the brick commercial buildings, that surround the station, were built around the 1940s and are representative of the architecture of that time. Various businesses and restaurants are within walking distance, as well as the Gastonia Conference Center and Gaston County Courthouse.

== History ==
Bradley Station was opened in 1994; it utilized an existing building that was built in 1980 and converted remnants of North Oakland Street, a result of Norfolk Southern tracks that were sunk below grade in a deep concrete-lined ravine in the early 1990s, into a circular bus turnaround. In 2020, the station building was expanded with a 50% increase of additional interior space, that allowed for more office space, a break room, training room, and dispatch window. In January 2021, the Bradley Station Dog Park was opened, located next to the station building.

== Services ==
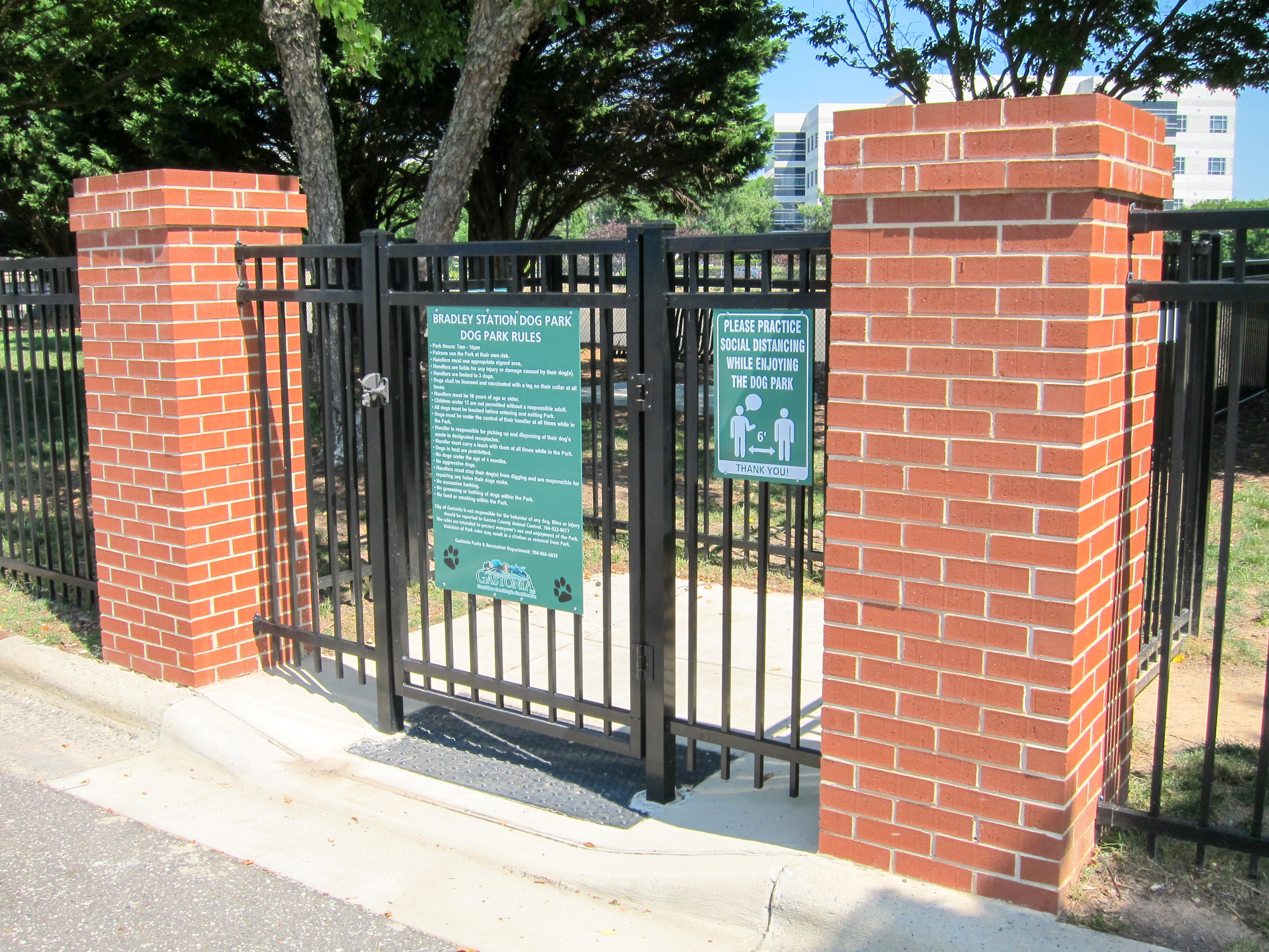
Bradley Station Dog Park

The station is owned by the City of Gastonia and operated by Gaston Transit. The station and the 140-space surface parking lot is open 24-hour; however, the station building is open Monday–Saturday during GT business hours. The station building includes tickets/information, restrooms, and waiting area. Outside, a long J-shaped shelter straddles along the circular bus turnaround, providing a shaded outdoor waiting area. The Bradley Station Dog Park is open daily from 7:00 a.m. to 10:00 p.m.

All GT routes begin or end at the station, Monday–Saturday. CATS operates, Monday–Friday, four morning and one evening express route to the Charlotte Transportation Center, in Uptown Charlotte. Sunway Charters operates two daily stops, 12:10 p.m. to Charlotte and 6:40 p.m. to Boone, with an additional two stops on Friday during ASU Fall/Spring semester.
