= Gaston County Courthouse =

Historic courthouse in North Carolina, US

- U.S. National Register of Historic Places
- U.S. Historic district – Contributing property
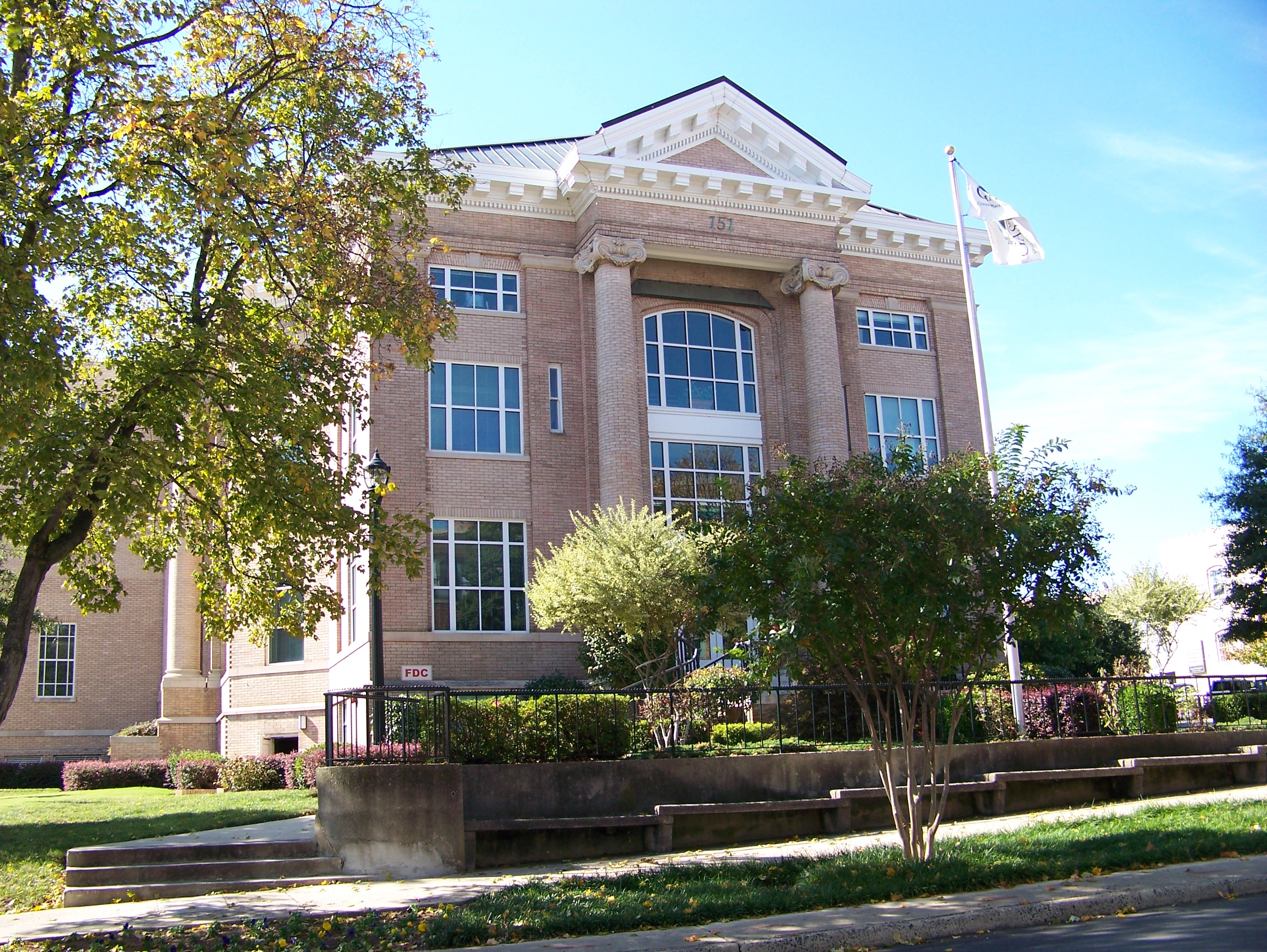
- The courthouse building in October 2011

- Location within North Carolina Location within the United States
- Location: N. York and S. South Sts., Gastonia, North Carolina
- Coordinates: 35°15′47″N 81°11′4″W
- Area: less than one acre
- Built: 1909-1910
- Architect: Milburn, Heister & Company
- Architectural style: Classical Revival
- MPS: North Carolina County Courthouses TR
- NRHP reference No.: 79001708
- Added to NRHP: May 10, 1979

Gaston County Courthouse is a historic courthouse building located at Gastonia, Gaston County, North Carolina. It was designed by Milburn, Heister & Company in 1909 and built in 1910. It is a three-story, rectangular, Classical Revival-style tan brick building with a rear addition. It features pedimented porticoes supported by Ionic order columns, a heavy modillion and dentil cornice, and three-sided pavilions on the side elevations. The building was renovated in 1954.

It was listed on the National Register of Historic Places in 1979. It is located in the Downtown Gastonia Historic District.
