= Loray Mill Historic District =

Historic district in North Carolina, United States

- U.S. National Register of Historic Places
- U.S. Historic district
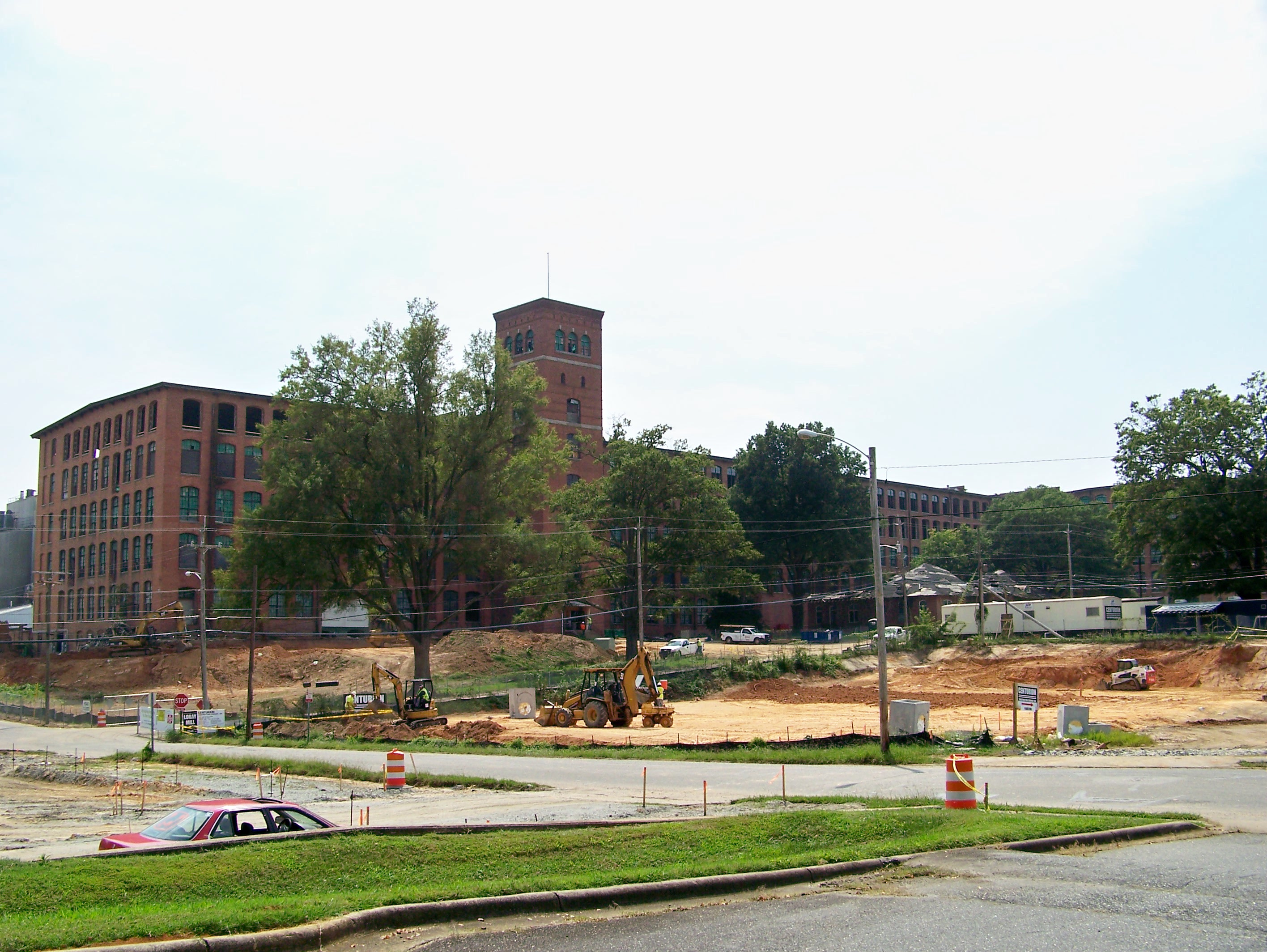
- Loray Mill

- Location within North Carolina Location within the United States
- Location: Roughly bounded by W. Franklin Blvd., S. Vance and S. Trenton Sts., and W. 6th Ave. B; also roughly bounded by S. Vance St., the railroad right-of-way, S. Hill St., and W. Franklin Boulevard, Gastonia, North Carolina
- Coordinates: 35°15′31″N 81°11′51″W
- Area: 69.4 acres (28.1 ha)
- Built: 1900
- Architect: Lockwood, Greene and Co.; Robert and Co.; Marvin W. Helms
- Architectural style: Bungalow/craftsman, Colonial Revival, Gothic Revival
- NRHP reference No.: 01001131 (original); 06000228 (increase)

Significant dates
- Added to NRHP: October 19, 2001
- Boundary increase: April 5, 2006

Loray Mill Historic District is a national historic district located at Gastonia, Gaston County, North Carolina. It encompasses 649 contributing buildings, 2 contributing sites, and 1 contributing structure in a predominantly residential section of Gastonia. The district includes the five-story brick Loray Mill (1900, 1901, 1921-1922) and all or parts of some thirty blocks of frame mill houses constructed primarily between the early 1900s and the 1920s. They include notable examples of Colonial Revival, Gothic Revival, and Bungalow / American Craftsman architecture. Other notable buildings include the Loray Baptist Church (1952).

It was listed on the National Register of Historic Places in 2001, with a boundary increase in 2006.

The district is linked to the Main Avenue section of downtown Gastonia via the FUSE District that includes a new stadium. The stadium has artificial turf and can be configured for baseball, soccer, football, rugby, and concerts to spur economic growth and investment in the area near the Loray Mill Historic District.
