= Third National Bank Building =

Historic building in North Carolina, US

- U.S. National Register of Historic Places
- U.S. Historic district – Contributing property
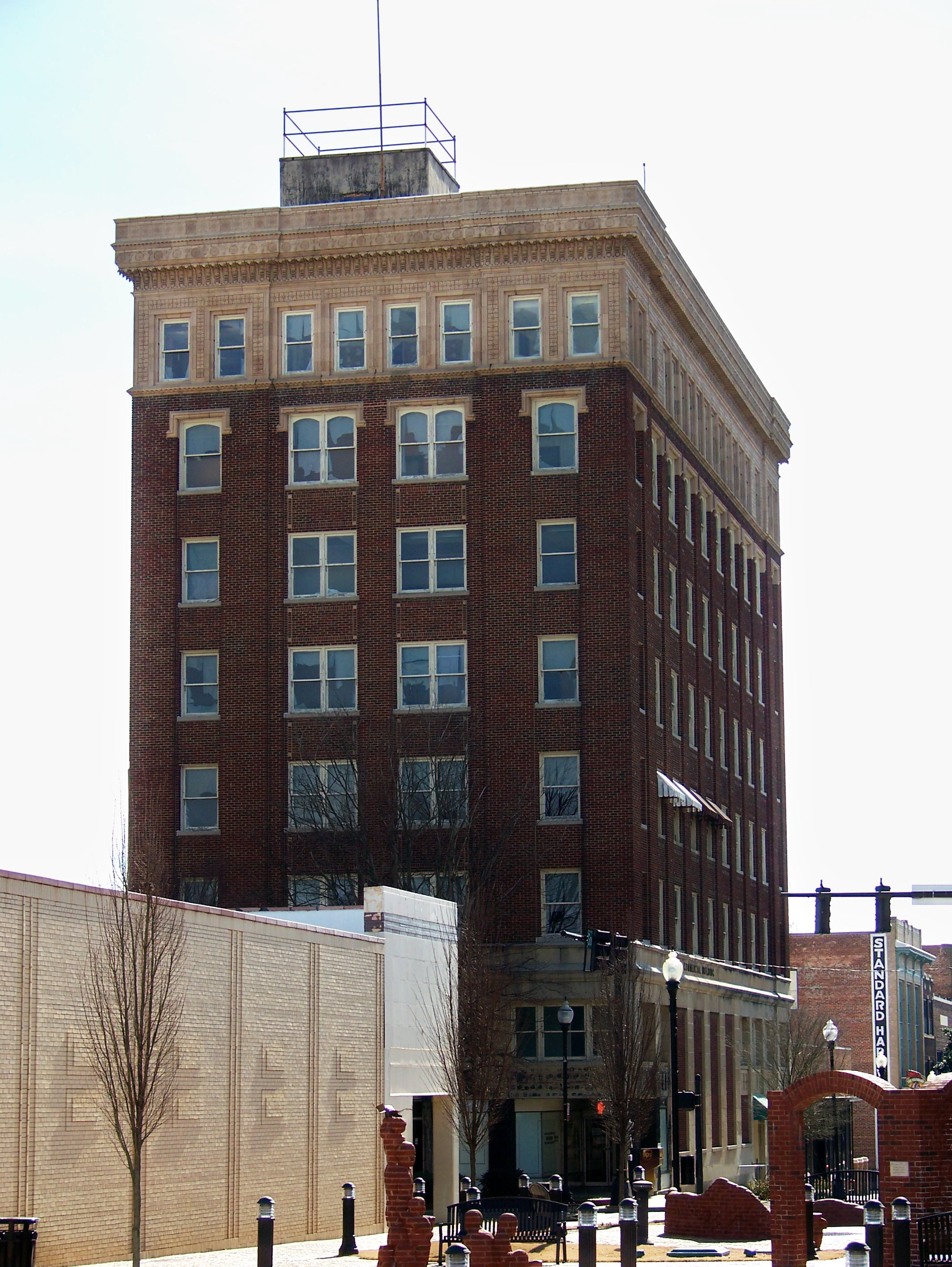

- Location within North Carolina Location within the United States
- Location: 195 W. Main Ave., Gastonia, North Carolina
- Coordinates: 35°15′49″N 81°11′2″W
- Area: Less than one acre
- Built: 1923
- Architect: Milburn, Heister & Company
- Architectural style: English Tudor Revival
- NRHP reference No.: 86000316
- Added to NRHP: February 20, 1986

Third National Bank Building is a historic office building located at Gastonia, Gaston County, North Carolina, USA. It was designed by Milburn, Heister & Company and built in 1923. It is an eight-story, four bay wide, English Tudor Revival-style steel frame building. It is sheathed in dark red brick and stone with a molded terra cotta covered top story. It features a projecting main entrance with a two-story segmental arched opening.

It was listed on the National Register of Historic Places in 1986. It is located in the Downtown Gastonia Historic District.
