= Robinson–Gardner Building =

Historic building in North Carolina, US

- U.S. National Register of Historic Places
- U.S. Historic district – Contributing property
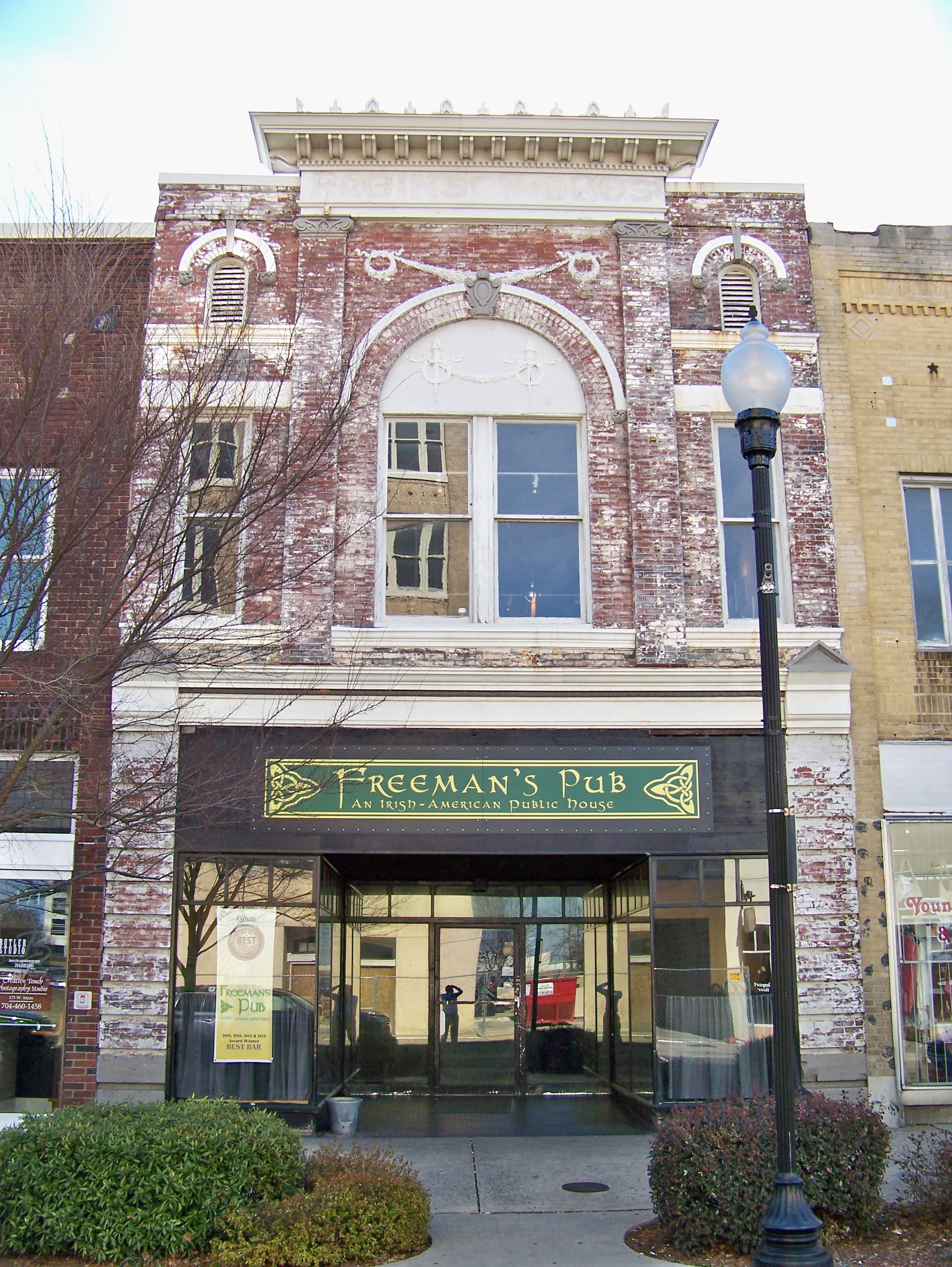

- Location within North Carolina Location within the United States
- Location: 173-175 W. Main Ave., Gastonia, North Carolina
- Coordinates: 35°15′49″N 81°11′0″W
- Area: less than one acre
- Built: 1899
- Architectural style: Renaissance
- NRHP reference No.: 99000436
- Added to NRHP: April 9, 1999

Robinson–Gardner Building, also known as the Robinson Brothers Building, is a historic commercial building located at Gastonia, Gaston County, North Carolina. It was built in 1899, and is a two-story, three-bay, brick building with Renaissance Revival-style design elements. The second story of the front facade features a round arch with a decorative cartouche at the keystone position and terra cotta swirls at the bases. Within the arch is a pressed metal swag between a pair of ribboned wreaths pierced by vertical torches. Above the arch, pressed metal wreaths hold another, larger, metal swag.

It was listed on the National Register of Historic Places in 1999. It is located in the Downtown Gastonia Historic District.
