= First National Bank Building (Gastonia, North Carolina) =

Historic building in North Carolina, US

- U.S. National Register of Historic Places
- U.S. Historic district – Contributing property
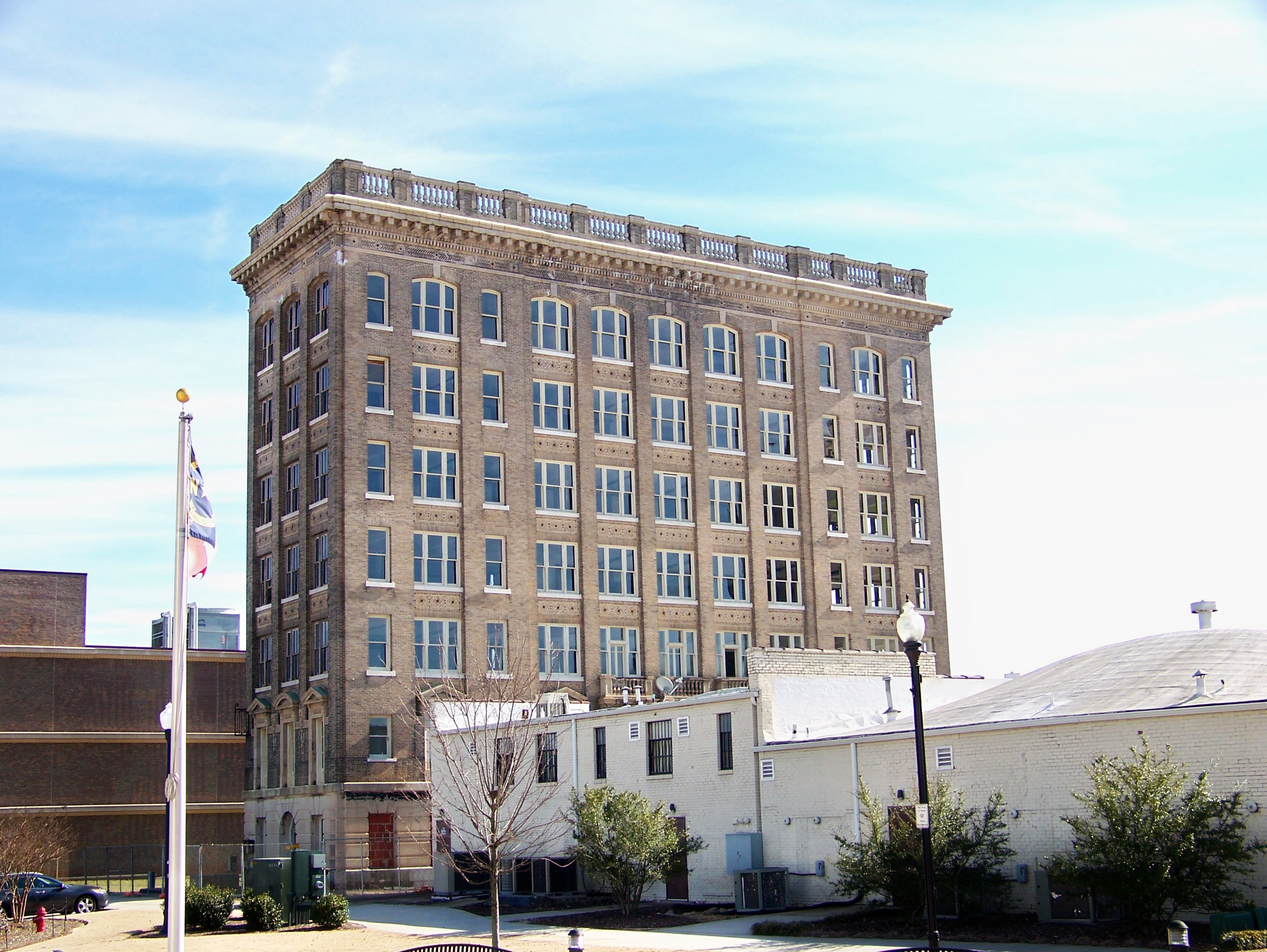

- Location within North Carolina Location within the United States
- Location: 168-170 W. Main Ave., Gastonia, North Carolina
- Coordinates: 35°15′49″N 81°10′59″W
- Area: less than one acre
- Built: 1916-1917
- Architect: Wilson & Sompayrac
- Architectural style: Classical Revival
- NRHP reference No.: 86000302
- Added to NRHP: February 20, 1986

First National Bank Building, also known as the Lawyers Building, is a historic office building located at Gastonia, Gaston County, North Carolina. It was designed by Wilson & Sompayrac and built in 1916–1917. It is a seven-story, rectangular, Classical Revival-style steel frame building. It is sheathed in cream-colored brick with limestone and terra cotta trim.

It was listed on the National Register of Historic Places in 1986. It is located in the Downtown Gastonia Historic District.
