= GoGastonia =

Transit service in Gastonia, North Carolina, USA

- Commenced operation: Gastonia Transit: 1978; GoGastonia: 2024
- Service area: Gastonia, North Carolina
- Service type: Microtransit
- Fleet: 22 minivans
- Operator: Via Transportation
- Website: gastonianc.gov/gogastonia

GoGastonia is a microtransit service in Gastonia, North Carolina, operated by Via Transportation and sponsored by the City of Gastonia. GoGastonia is the successor of Gastonia Transit System, the city's fixed-route bus service, which was replaced by the microtransit service beginning in July 2024. GoGastonia uses a fleet of 22 minivans to provide service, including 6 wheelchair-accessible vans.

== History ==
Gastonia Transit began operation in 1978, when the city of Gastonia took over the operations of two failing private bus operators: the Gastonia Transit Company and the City Coach Company. The two companies shared ownership and management, and began receiving subsidies from the Urban Mass Transit Administration and Gaston County in 1975. Gastonia Transit served 1,500 passengers per day on average in 1991, with 7 fixed-route buses on 13 routes and an annual operating budget of $850,000.

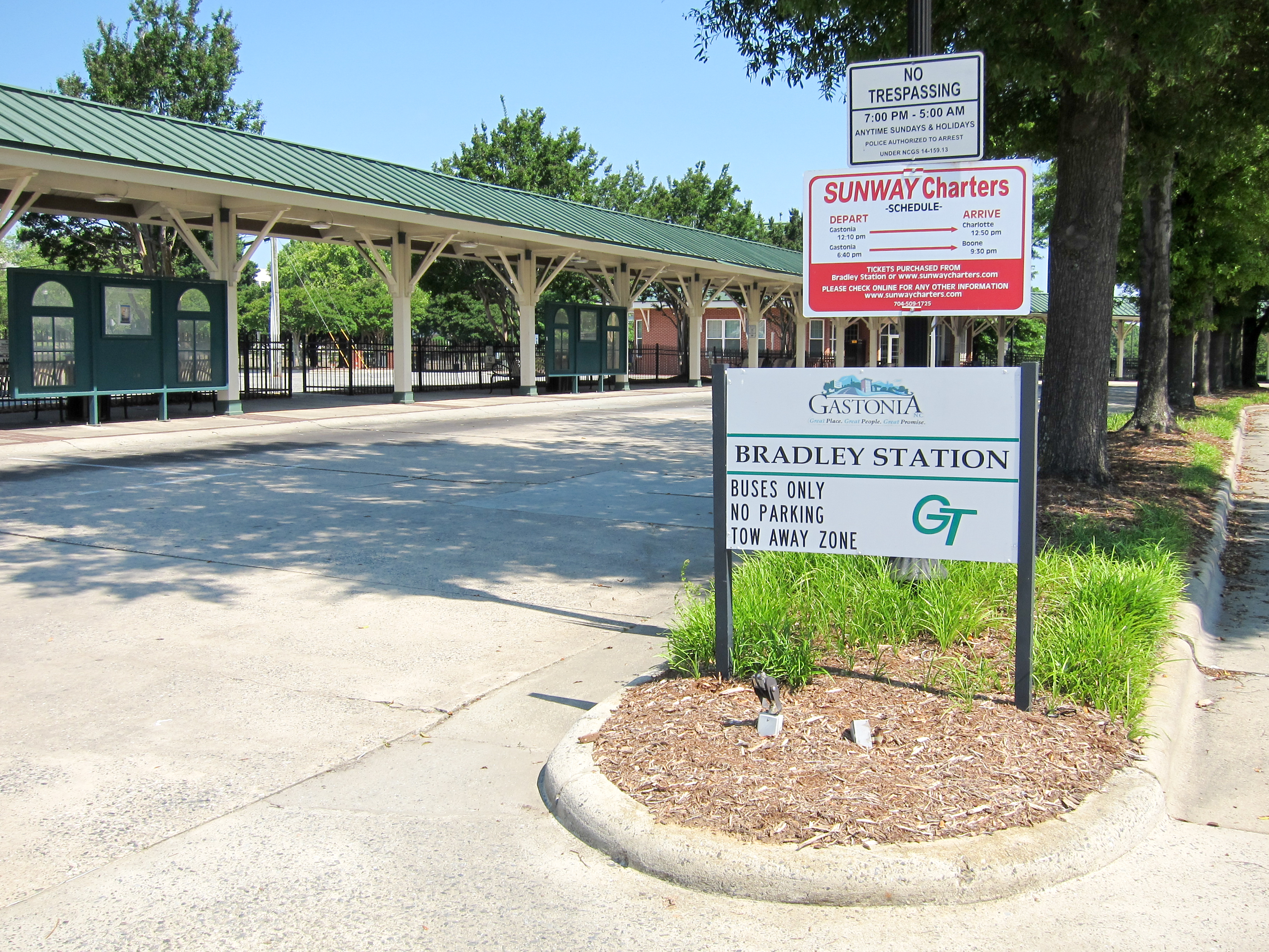
Bradley Station in 2022

Bradley Station in downtown Gastonia opened in 1994, providing a central station for all Gastonia Transit services. The station was rebuilt from an existing building, and was also intended to serve intercity buses.

The annual budget to operate Gastonia Transit services rose to approximately $1.8 million by 2001. That year, Gastonia Transit began a partnership with the Charlotte Area Transit System for a Gastonia–Belmont–Charlotte commuter bus service, operated by CATS. Gastonia Transit revised its schedules in 2004, retaining the existing routes and adding schedule padding to improve reliability. The schedule changes resulted in lower levels of service, with most routes operating every 90 minutes instead of every 60 minutes. The schedule changes, combined with a fare increase, resulted in a significant decrease in ridership. From 2004 to 2006, annual ridership decreased from over 400,000 to approximately 283,000 trips, a change of over 29%.

A 2007 study criticized the 2004 schedule changes, especially the decision to retain existing routes and increase travel time. The study recommended revising the routes and working to improve frequency, with the goal of regaining ridership and keeping operating costs consistent. The study's recommendations were implemented in 2009, with reduced travel times, better frequencies, and expanded services to the south side of Gastonia.

From March 2020 to August 2022, Gastonia Transit suspended fares due to the effects of the COVID-19 pandemic in North Carolina. Federal funding from the CARES Act made up for the lost revenue from fares. Bradley Station was remodeled in 2022, adding office and break room space.

In January 2024, the city of Gastonia announced that it would eliminate its fixed-route bus system. In its place, the city council approved a contract with Via Transportation for a microtransit service, using a fleet of minivans that are dispatched using a mobile app. GoGastonia began service on July 1, 2024 with a fleet of 14 Honda Odyssey minivans, replacing 6 bus routes. The fare for GoGastonia was initially set at $2.00, an increase from the existing $1.25 bus fare.

Residents and media criticized the GoGastonia service in August 2024, following multiple incidents where passengers were left stranded after waiting multiple hours for a ride. City officials attributed the delays to high demand for the service. The city announced an expansion of the service in September 2024, adding more vans to the service for a total of 22. To help fund the service expansion, fares were increased from $2.00 to $2.50, effective January 2025.

== Former fixed routes ==
The six fixed routes all served Bradley Station. The standard fare was $1.25.

#	Route Name	Destinations
1	Pink Line	Franklin & New Hope, Social Security Building, New Hope & Huntsmoor, Franklin Square, and Gaston Mall/Target
2	Blue Line	Village Square, YMCA, Hudson & Union, Main Library, and Schiele Museum
3	Brown Line (Eastbound)	Dixie Village, Hudson & Myrtle, Health Department, and Chester & 10th
3	Brown Line (Westbound)	Chester & 10th, Health Department, Hudson & Myrtle, and Dixie Village
4	Red Line (Eastbound)	Dixie Village and Linwood Terrace Apartments
4	Red Line (Westbound)	Loray Mill, Bessemer Crescent, and Dixie Village
5	Yellow Line (Eastbound)	Dixie Village, May & Webb, Glenn & Davidson, and Radio Street Apartments
5	Yellow Line (Westbound)	Radio Street Apartments, Glenn & Davidson, May & Webb, and Dixie Village
6	Green Line (Eastbound)	Modena & Ozark, CaroMont Regional Medical Center, and Eastridge Mall
6	Green Line (Westbound)	Eastridge Mall, Summit Crossing, and Modena & Ozark

Routes as listed are as of July 2018.
