= Marshall Rauch =

American politician (1923–2025)

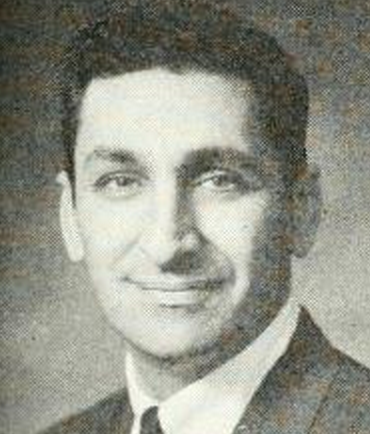

Member of the North Carolina Senate from the 25th district
- In office 1967–1990

Personal details
- Born: Marshall Arthur Rauch; February 2, 1923 Long Island, New York, U.S.
- Died: March 18, 2025 (aged 102) Dallas, North Carolina, U.S.
- Party: Democratic
- Spouse: Jeanne Girard (m. 1946; died 2010)
- Children: 5
- Education: Duke University

Marshall Arthur Rauch (February 2, 1923 – March 18, 2025) was an American politician in the state of North Carolina.

== Life and career ==
A native of New York City, Rauch was born there to Nathan A. and Tillie (Wohl) Rauch. He attended Duke University. Rauch moved to Gastonia in Gaston County, North Carolina, where he was involved in many county, civic and community organizations. In the 1950s and early 1960s, Rauch served on the Gastonia City Council with stints as mayor pro tempore. He married Jeanne Girard in 1946 and had five children. Rauch also owned Rauch Industries Inc. a Christmas ornament company in Gaston County, North Carolina from 1954 to 1998.

In 1967, he was elected to the North Carolina State Senate, representing the 25th district. He served until 1990, making him the longest-serving Jewish senator in North Carolina history.

In 2013, Rauch was honored by the Gaston County Community Foundation. A section of Interstate 85 near Gastonia is designated the Senator Marshall Arthur Rauch Highway.

Rauch turned 100 on February 2, 2023, and died in Dallas, North Carolina on March 18, 2025, at the age of 102.
