= Downtown Gastonia Historic District =

Historic district in North Carolina, United States

- U.S. National Register of Historic Places
- U.S. Historic district
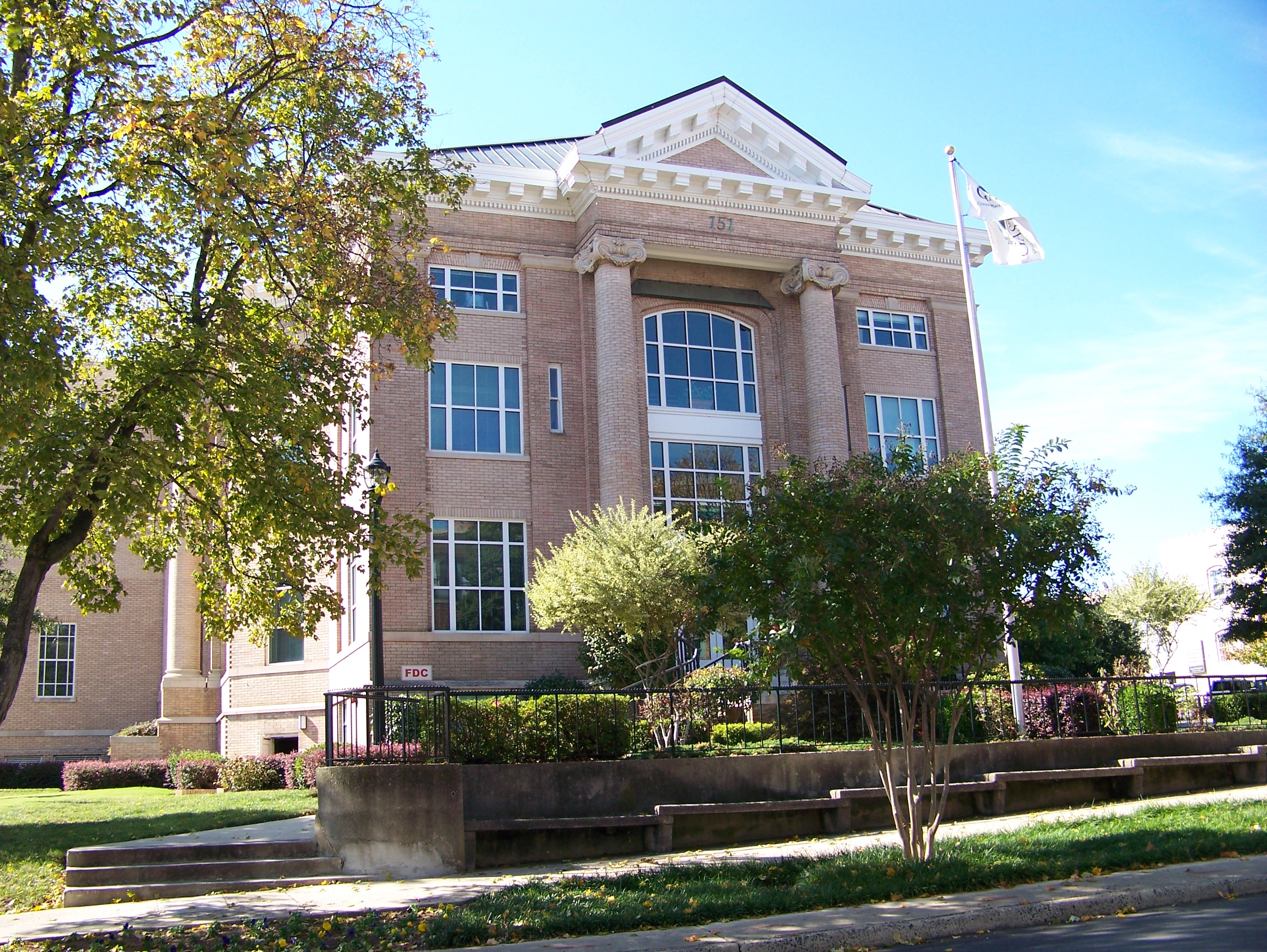
- Second Gaston County Courthouse, 2011

- Location within North Carolina Location within the United States
- Location: Roughly bounded by Main Ave., Broad St., Second Ave., and Chester St., Gastonia, North Carolina
- Coordinates: 35°15′41″N 81°10′56″W
- Area: 46 acres (19 ha)
- Built: 1910
- Architect: White, Hugh E.; Milburn & Hester
- Architectural style: Colonial Revival, Classical Revival
- NRHP reference No.: 03001375
- Added to NRHP: January 6, 2004

Downtown Gastonia Historic District is a national historic district located at Gastonia, Gaston County, North Carolina. It encompasses 77 contributing buildings and 1 contributing object in the central business district of Gastonia. The commercial, civic, institutional, and multi-unit residential buildings were built between the 1890s and 1954, and include notable examples of Colonial Revival and Classical Revival architecture. Located in the district are the separately listed former Gaston County Courthouse, First National Bank Building, Third National Bank Building, and Robinson-Gardner Building. Other notable buildings include the U.S. Post Office (1935), York Medical Building (1938), Kress Department Store, Leibowitz Department Store (c. 1910), Ideal Moving Picture Theater (c. 1912), City Hall, Kirby Building (1922), First Baptist Church (1922), Gaston County War Memorial Hall (1928), and the (former) Gaston County Public Library (1930).

It was listed on the National Register of Historic Places in 2004.

== Gallery ==
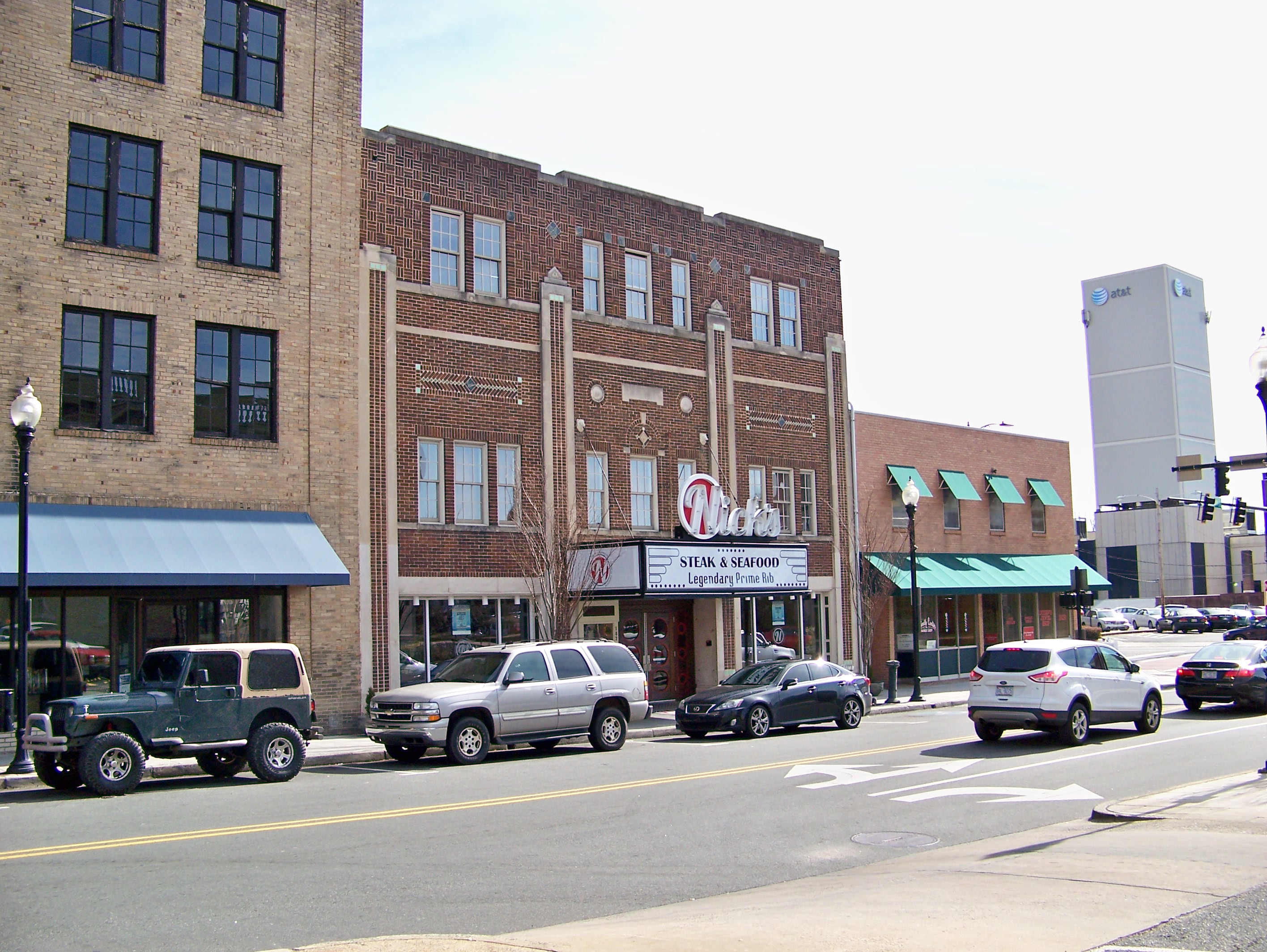
Nick's Steak & Seafood in the former Webb Theater, 2014

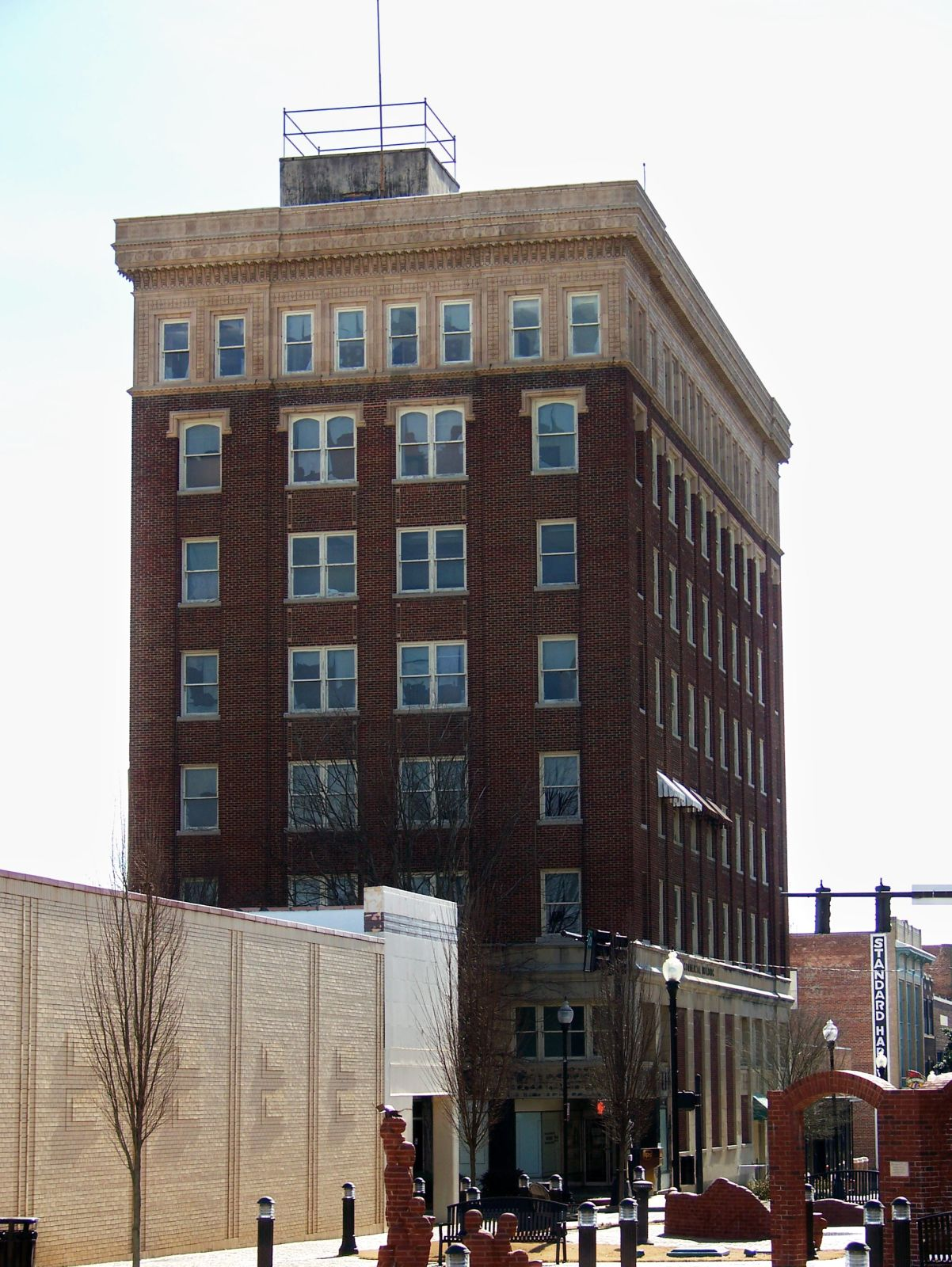
Third National Bank, 2014

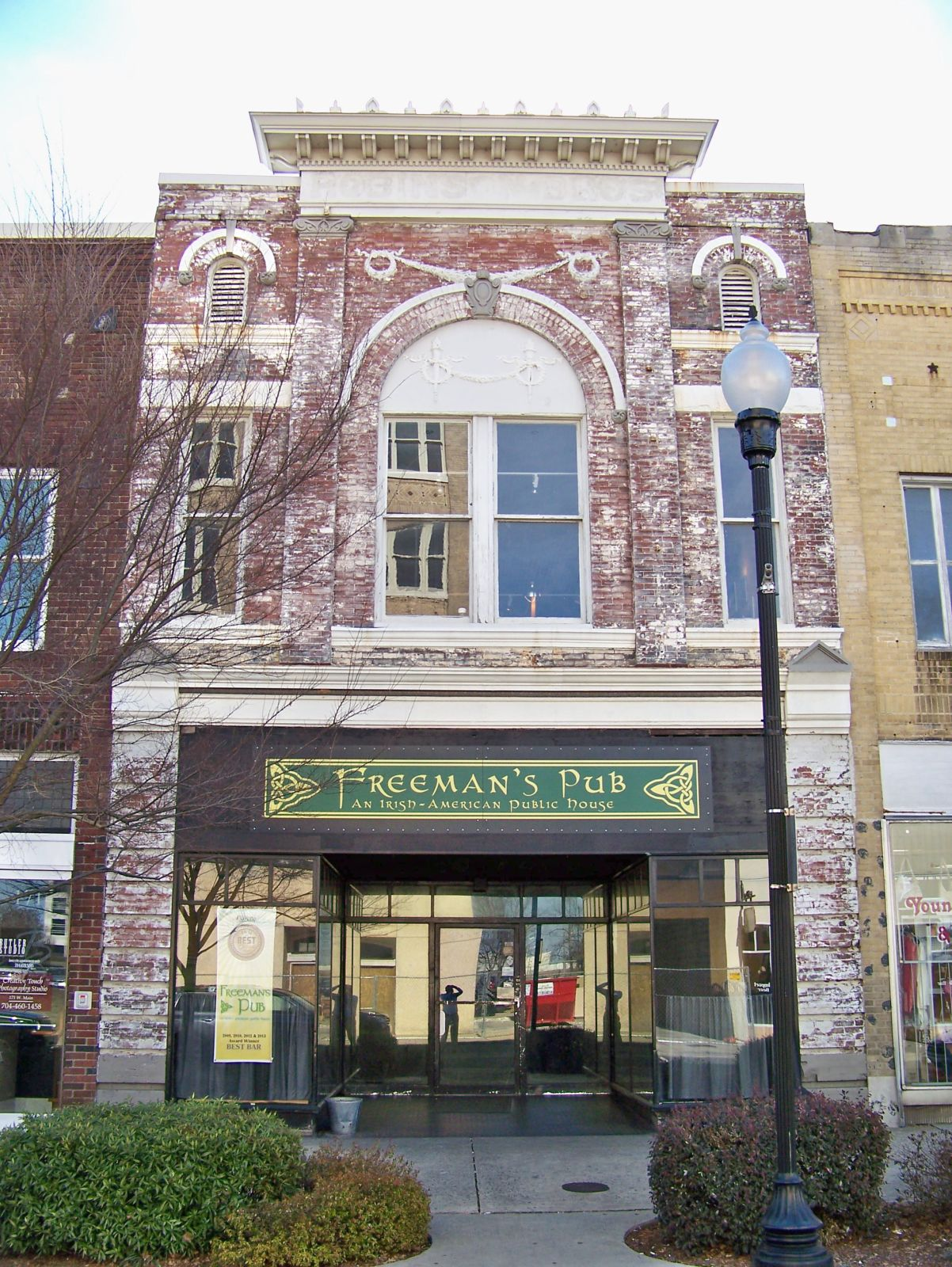
Robinson-Gardner Building, 2014

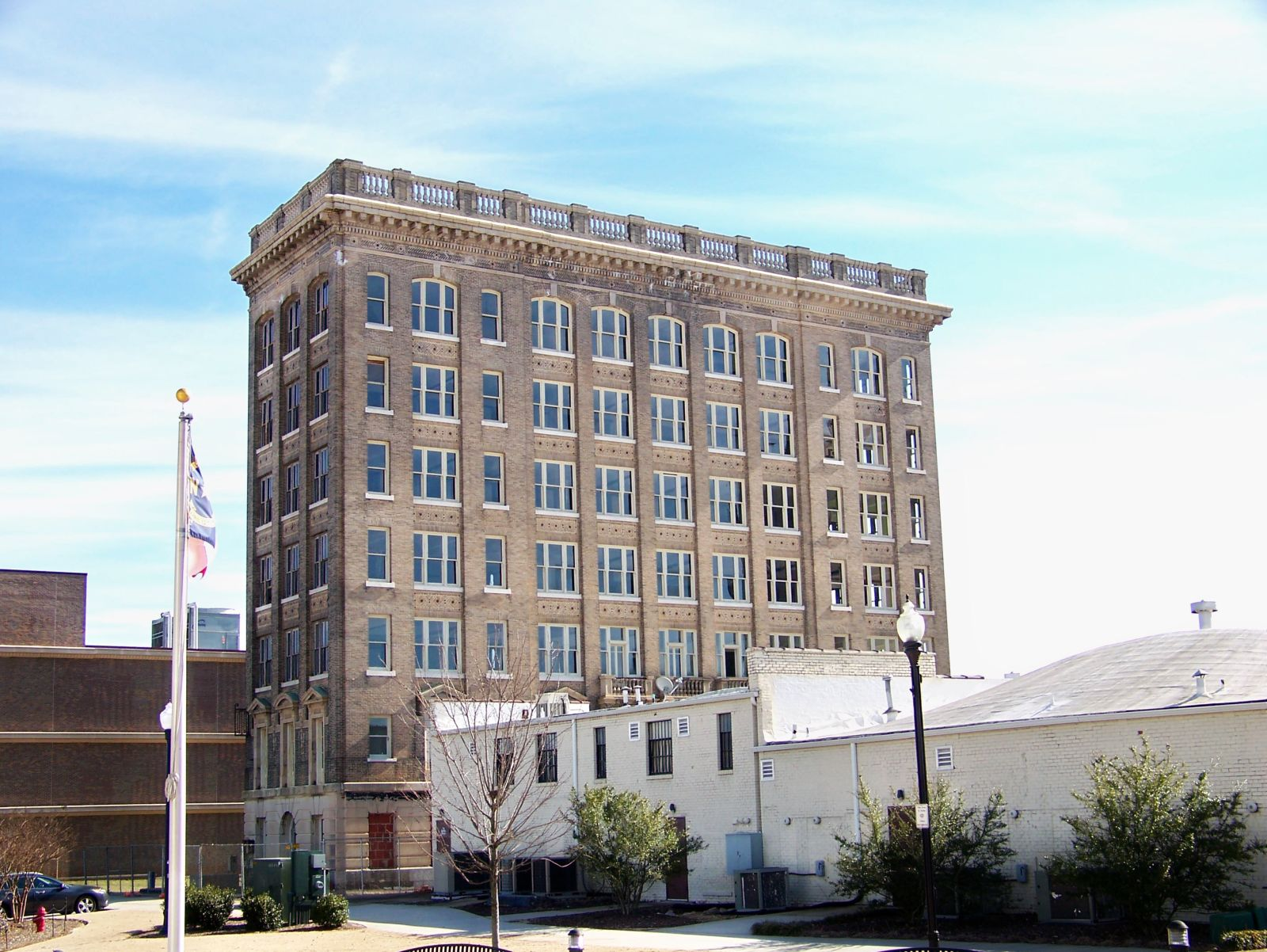
First National Bank Building, 2014
