= Gastonia, North Carolina =

Gastonia
- City
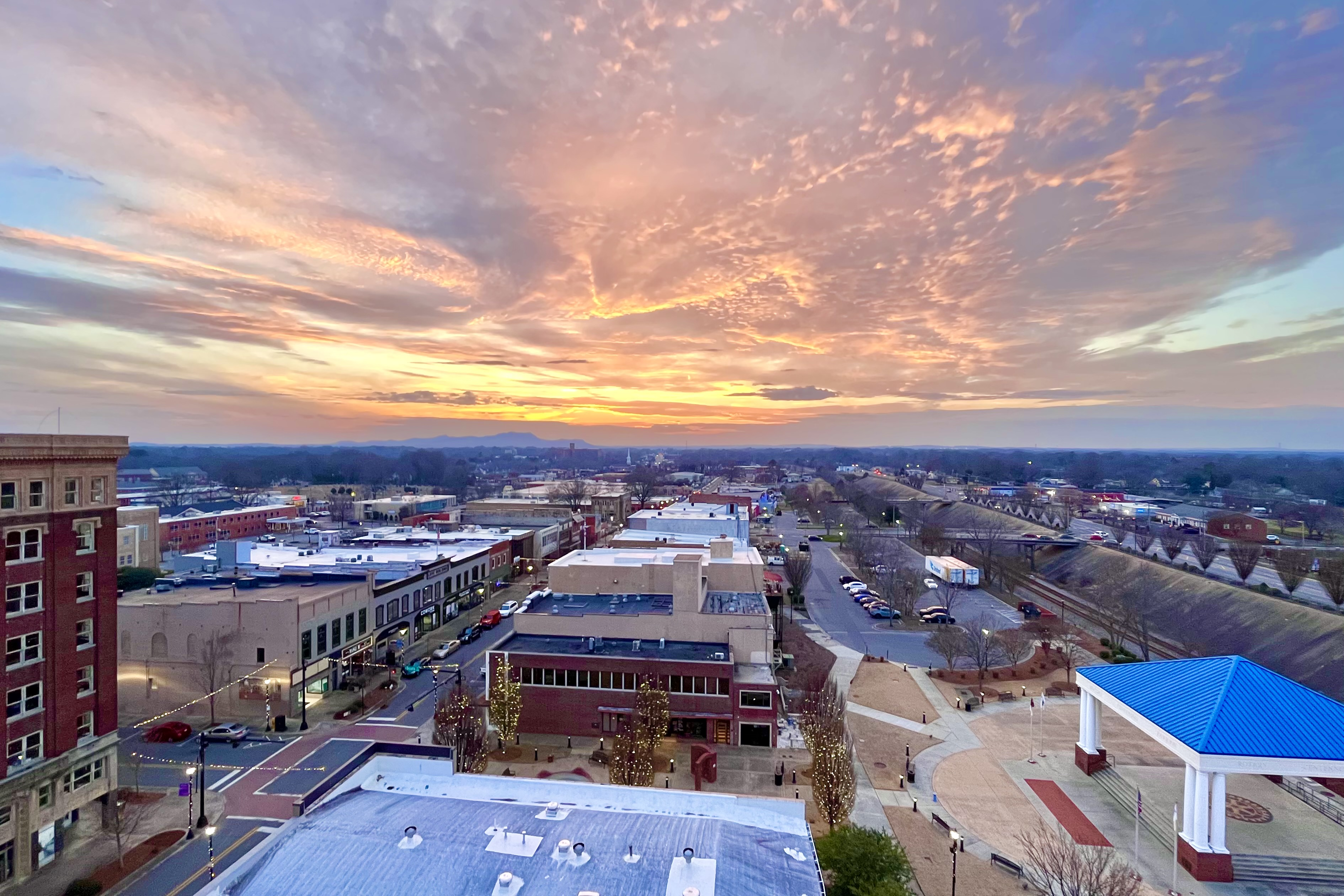
- Downtown Gastonia

- Flag Seal Logo
- Nickname: Spindle City
- Motto: "Great Place. Great People. Great Promise."
- Interactive map of Gastonia
- Location within North Carolina Location within the United States
- Coordinates: 35°14′57″N 81°11′08″W
- Country: United States
- State: North Carolina
- County: Gaston
- Incorporated: 1877
- Named for: William Gaston

Government
  - Type: Council–manager
  - Mayor: Richard Franks (R)

Area
  - Total: 52.22 sq mi (135.24 km^{2})
  - Land: 51.99 sq mi (134.65 km^{2})
  - Water: 0.23 sq mi (0.59 km^{2}) 0.44%
- Elevation: 738 ft (225 m)

Population (2020)
  - Total: 80,411
  - Estimate (2023): 83,942
  - Density: 1,546.7/sq mi (597.17/km^{2})
  - Urban: 176,897 (US: 208th)
  - Urban density: 1,420/sq mi (548.2/km^{2})
- Time zone: UTC−5 (EST)
  - Summer (DST): UTC−4 (EDT)
- ZIP Codes: 28052–28056
- Area codes: 704, 980
- FIPS code: 37-25580
- GNIS feature ID: 2403684
- Website: www.gastonianc.gov

Gastonia is a city in and the county seat of Gaston County, North Carolina, United States. The most populous city in the county and the 13th-most populous city in North Carolina, the population was 80,411 at the 2020 census. It is part of the Charlotte-Concord-Gastonia, NC-SC Metropolitan Statistical Area, which is part of the Charlotte-Concord, NC-SC Combined Statistical Area.

The city is a historic center for textile manufacturing and was the site of the Loray Mill Strike of 1929, which became a key event in the labor movement. While manufacturing remains important to the local economy, the city also has healthcare, education, and government sectors.

== History ==
Gastonia is named for William Gaston, a jurist and United States Representative from North Carolina.

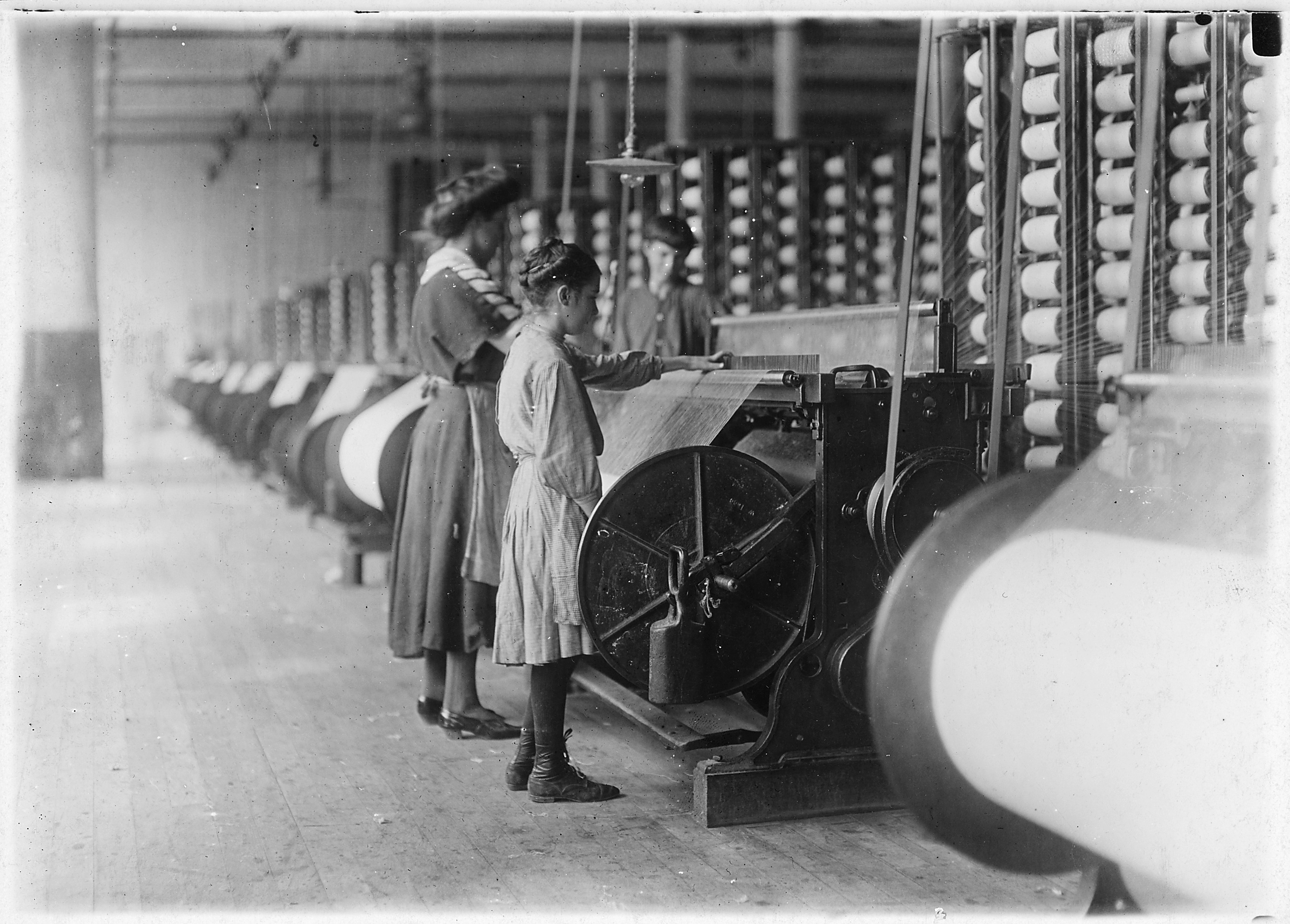
Child labor at Loray Mill in Gastonia, 1908. Photo by Lewis Hine.

The Loray Mill strike occurred in Gastonia in 1929. The role of organizers for Communist Party-affiliated National Textile Workers Union (NTWU) alienated religious leaders in Gastonia, who denounced the organizers' ideology, undermining support for the strike. The strike collapsed after the death of Gastonia's police chief, Orville Alderholt, led to a murder trial of several militants including NTWU chief organizer Fred Beal. Beal was convicted in the killing but fled to the Soviet Union. The strike largely failed in attaining its goals of better working conditions and wages, and the American labor movement was never able to gain a foothold among textile workers in Gastonia. The strike, however, became for a while an international cause célèbre, figuring in several novels published in the 1930s.

=== National Register of Historic Places ===
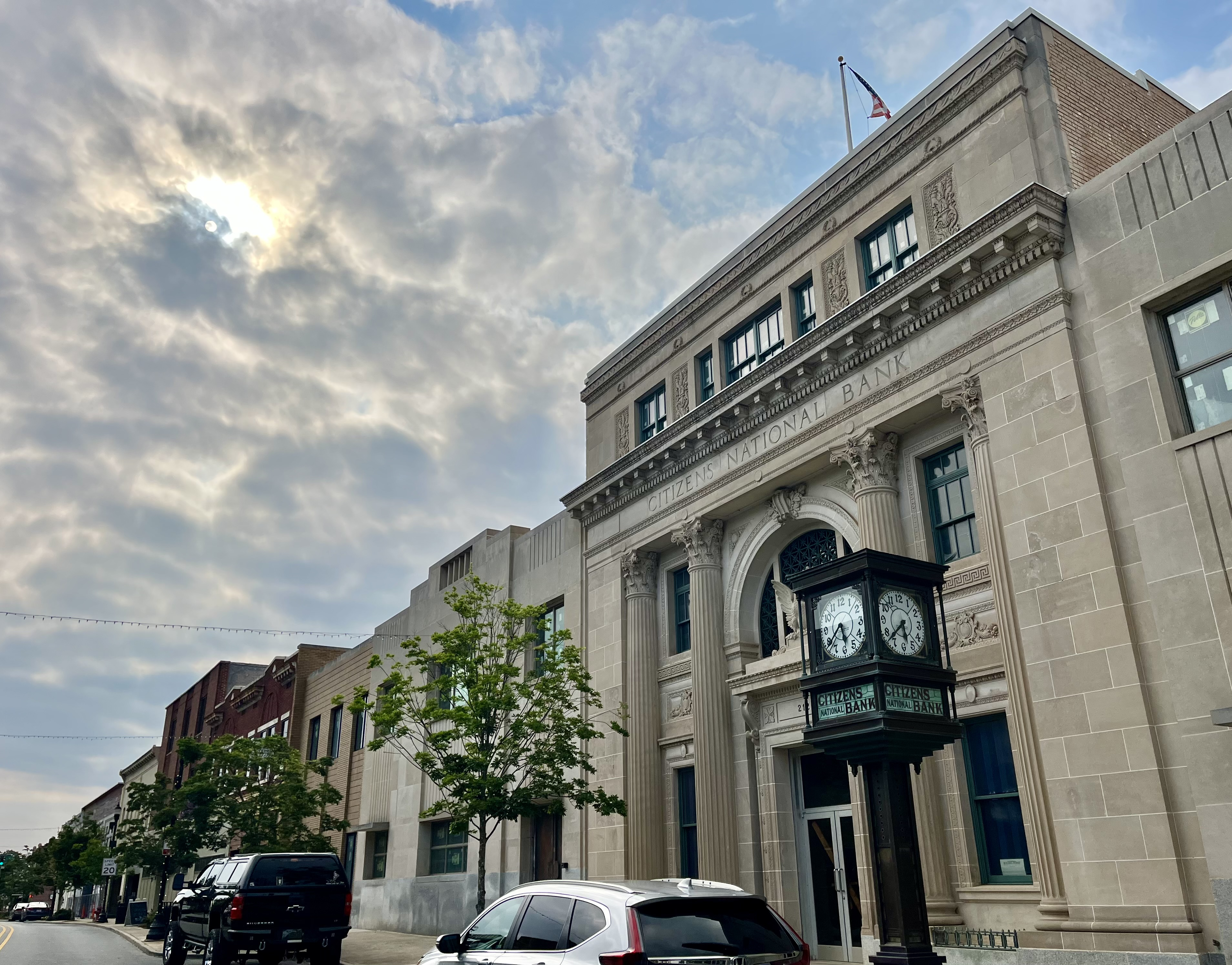
Citizens National Bank in Downtown Gastonia

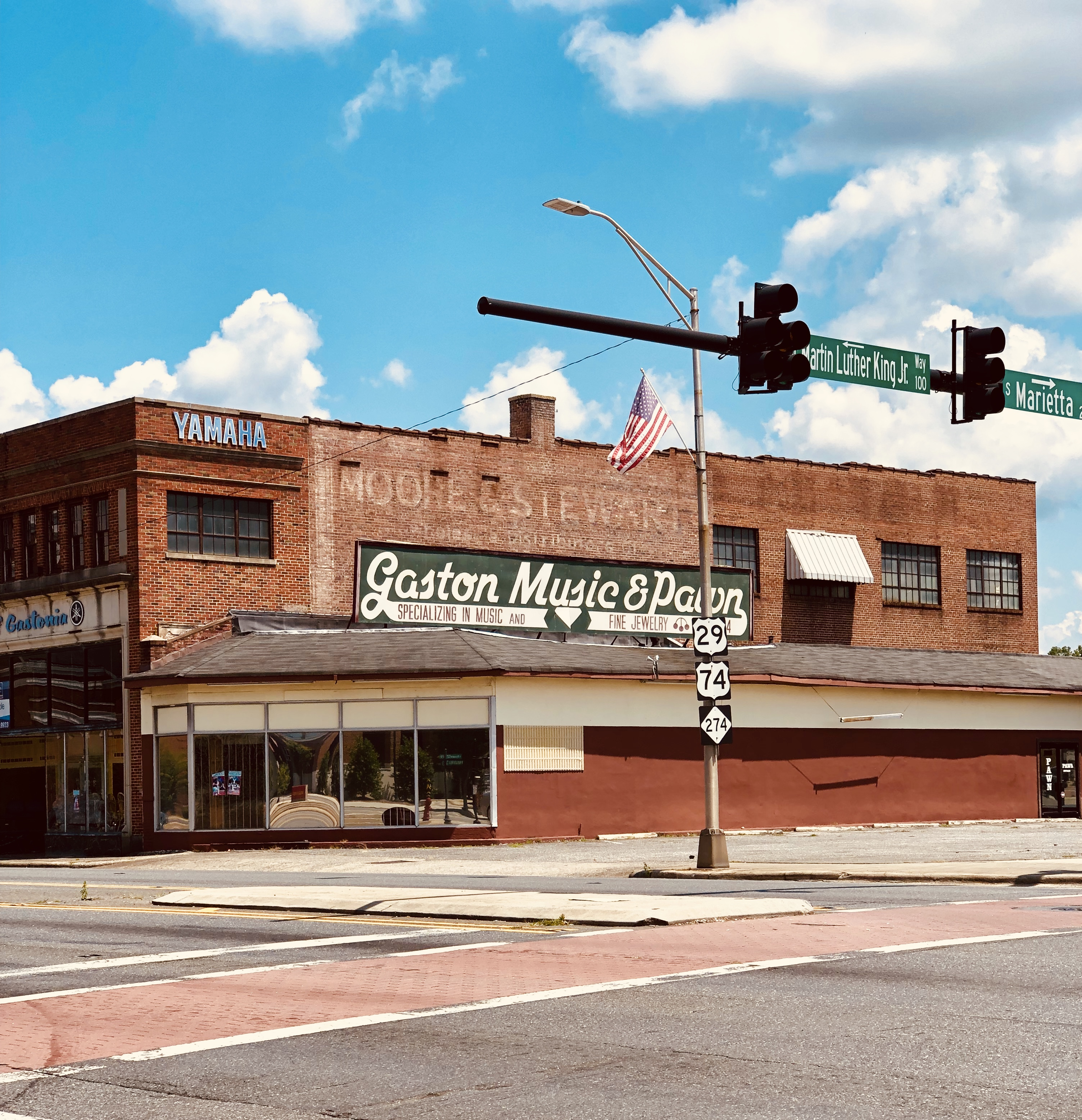
Intersection on East Franklin Boulevard

The City Hospital-Gaston Memorial Hospital, Craig Farmstead, Downtown Gastonia Historic District, First National Bank Building, Gaston County Courthouse, Gastonia High School, David Jenkins House, Loray Mill Historic District, Robinson-Gardner Building, Third National Bank Building, and William J. Wilson House are listed on the National Register of Historic Places.

== Geography ==
According to the United States Census Bureau, the city has a total area of 52.22 square miles (135.2 km^{2}), of which 51.99 square miles (134.7 km^{2}) is land and 0.23 square miles (0.60 km^{2}) (0.44%) is water. Gastonia occupies 14% of the total area of Gaston County. Gastonia is approximately 21 miles (34 km) west of Charlotte, 22 miles (35 km) east of Shelby, and 37 miles (60 km) south of Hickory.

=== Climate ===
Climate data for Gastonia, North Carolina (1991–2020)
Month	Jan	Feb	Mar	Apr	May	Jun	Jul	Aug	Sep	Oct	Nov	Dec	Year
Mean daily maximum °F (°C)	52.7 (11.5)	57.0 (13.9)	64.7 (18.2)	73.8 (23.2)	80.5 (26.9)	87.3 (30.7)	90.7 (32.6)	89.2 (31.8)	84.0 (28.9)	74.3 (23.5)	63.8 (17.7)	55.6 (13.1)	72.8 (22.7)
Daily mean °F (°C)	42.1 (5.6)	45.6 (7.6)	52.6 (11.4)	61.8 (16.6)	69.4 (20.8)	77.0 (25.0)	80.5 (26.9)	79.2 (26.2)	73.6 (23.1)	62.7 (17.1)	51.9 (11.1)	45.0 (7.2)	61.8 (16.5)
Mean daily minimum °F (°C)	31.4 (−0.3)	34.1 (1.2)	40.4 (4.7)	49.7 (9.8)	58.3 (14.6)	66.7 (19.3)	70.2 (21.2)	69.1 (20.6)	63.3 (17.4)	51.0 (10.6)	40.0 (4.4)	34.5 (1.4)	50.7 (10.4)
Average precipitation inches (mm)	3.84 (98)	3.27 (83)	3.55 (90)	3.51 (89)	3.54 (90)	4.29 (109)	3.55 (90)	4.55 (116)	3.69 (94)	3.39 (86)	3.02 (77)	3.75 (95)	43.95 (1,117)
Average snowfall inches (cm)	0.9 (2.3)	0.0 (0.0)	0.0 (0.0)	0.0 (0.0)	0.0 (0.0)	0.0 (0.0)	0.0 (0.0)	0.0 (0.0)	0.0 (0.0)	0.0 (0.0)	0.0 (0.0)	0.3 (0.76)	1.2 (3.06)
Source: NOAA

== Demographics ==
Historical population
Census	Pop.	Note	%±
1880	236		—
1890	1,033		337.7%
1900	4,610		346.3%
1910	5,759		24.9%
1920	12,871		123.5%
1930	17,093		32.8%
1940	21,313		24.7%
1950	23,069		8.2%
1960	37,276		61.6%
1970	47,322		27.0%
1980	47,218		−0.2%
1990	54,732		15.9%
2000	66,277		21.1%
2010	71,741		8.2%
2020	80,411		12.1%
2025 (est.)	87,067	▲	8.3%
U.S. Decennial Census

=== Racial and ethnic composition ===
Gastonia, North Carolina – Racial and ethnic composition Note: the U.S. census treats Hispanic/Latino as an ethnic category. This table excludes Latinos from the racial categories and assigns them to a separate category. Hispanics/Latinos may be of any race.
Race / Ethnicity (NH = Non-Hispanic)	Pop 2000	Pop 2010	Pop 2020	% 2000	% 2010	% 2020
White alone (NH)	44,615	42,614	40,855	67.32%	59.40%	50.81%
Black or African American alone (NH)	16,520	19,661	24,334	24.93%	27.41%	30.26%
Native American or Alaska Native alone (NH)	118	201	216	0.18%	0.28%	0.27%
Asian alone (NH)	765	956	1,389	1.15%	1.33%	1.73%
Pacific Islander alone (NH)	13	7	17	0.02%	0.01%	0.02%
Other race alone (NH)	67	145	329	0.10%	0.20%	0.41%
Mixed race or Multiracial (NH)	566	1,256	3,100	0.85%	1.75%	3.86%
Hispanic or Latino (any race)	3,613	6,901	10,171	5.45%	9.62%	12.65%
Total	66,277	74,741	80,411	100.00%	100.00%	100.00%

=== 2020 census ===
As of the 2020 census, Gastonia had a population of 80,411 and 31,870 households, including 18,361 families. The median age was 38.9 years. 23.3% of residents were under the age of 18 and 16.5% of residents were 65 years of age or older. For every 100 females there were 89.9 males, and for every 100 females age 18 and over there were 85.8 males age 18 and over.

99.7% of residents lived in urban areas, while 0.3% lived in rural areas.

Of the city's 31,870 households, 31.3% had children under the age of 18 living in them. Of all households, 39.6% were married-couple households, 19.0% were households with a male householder and no spouse or partner present, and 34.0% were households with a female householder and no spouse or partner present. About 29.7% of all households were made up of individuals and 11.3% had someone living alone who was 65 years of age or older.

There were 34,346 housing units, of which 7.2% were vacant. The homeowner vacancy rate was 1.7% and the rental vacancy rate was 7.6%.

Racial composition as of the 2020 census
Race	Number	Percent
White	42,260	52.6%
Black or African American	24,692	30.7%
American Indian and Alaska Native	393	0.5%
Asian	1,404	1.7%
Native Hawaiian and Other Pacific Islander	22	0.0%
Some other race	5,705	7.1%
Two or more races	5,935	7.4%
Hispanic or Latino (of any race)	10,171	12.6%

=== 2010 census ===
At the 2010 census, there were 71,741 people, 27,770 households, and 18,599 families residing in the city. The population density was 1,420.6 inhabitants per square mile (548.5/km^{2}). There were 31,238 housing units at an average density of 618.6 per square mile (238.8/km^{2}). The racial composition of the city was 62.8% White, 27.5% Black or African American, 2.0% Asian, 0.4% Native American, 5.2% some other race, and 3.0% two or more races. 9.7% of the population were Hispanic or Latino American of any race.

As of the 2010 census, there were 27,770 households, out of which 34.7% had children under the age of 18 living with them, 42.5% were headed by married couples living together, 19.0% had a female householder with no husband present, and 33.0% were non-families. 27.1% of all households were made up of individuals, and 9.7% were someone living alone who was 65 years of age or older. The average household size was 2.52, and the average family size was 3.05.

In the city, the population was spread out, with 24.7% under the age of 18, 8.9% from 18 to 24, 26.5% from 25 to 44, 26.3% from 45 to 64, and 13.6% who were 65 years of age or older. The median age was 38.0 years. For every 100 females, there were 89.6 males. For every 100 females age 18 and over, there were 85.6 males.

=== 2011 American Community Survey ===
In 2011 the estimated median income for a household in the city was $36,881, and the median income for a family was $44,576. Male full-time workers had a median income of $38,151 versus $29,590 for females. The per capita income for the city was $19,277. 20.9% of the population and 18.3% of families were below the poverty line. 32.5% of those under the age of 18 and 6.9% of those 65 and older were living below the poverty line.

=== Crime ===
Offense	Gastonia (2024)
All Violent Crime	727
• Homicide	4
• Rape	34
• Robbery	105
• Aggravated Assault	584
All Property Crime	3029
• Larceny	2212
• Burglary	439
• Motor Vehicle Theft	356
• Arson	22

== Economy ==
Many shutdowns and job losses have plagued Gastonia over the past decade. Gastonia maintains a relatively strong manufacturing workforce, but many workers are laid off and many more are facing job losses. The city had an unemployment rate of 7.9% as of 2010; 12,536 of the 71,341 residents lived and worked in the city, with a daytime population change of +10,610. The city is the international corporate headquarters for textile company Parkdale Mills, the number one manufacturer of spun yarn in the world. The company also operated two production facilities in Gastonia and several in surrounding communities. Parkdale, like many other companies, has closed plants and moved production to other countries.

Other manufacturers in Gastonia include Wix Filtration Corp., Freightliner Trucks, Stabilus, Curtiss-Wright Controls Engineered Systems and Radici Group. Other major employers include the City of Gastonia and Gaston County governments, the Gaston County Schools system, CaroMont Regional Medical Center, and retailers Walmart and Advance Auto Parts, with two and six stores (plus a distribution center) respectively.

== Arts and culture ==
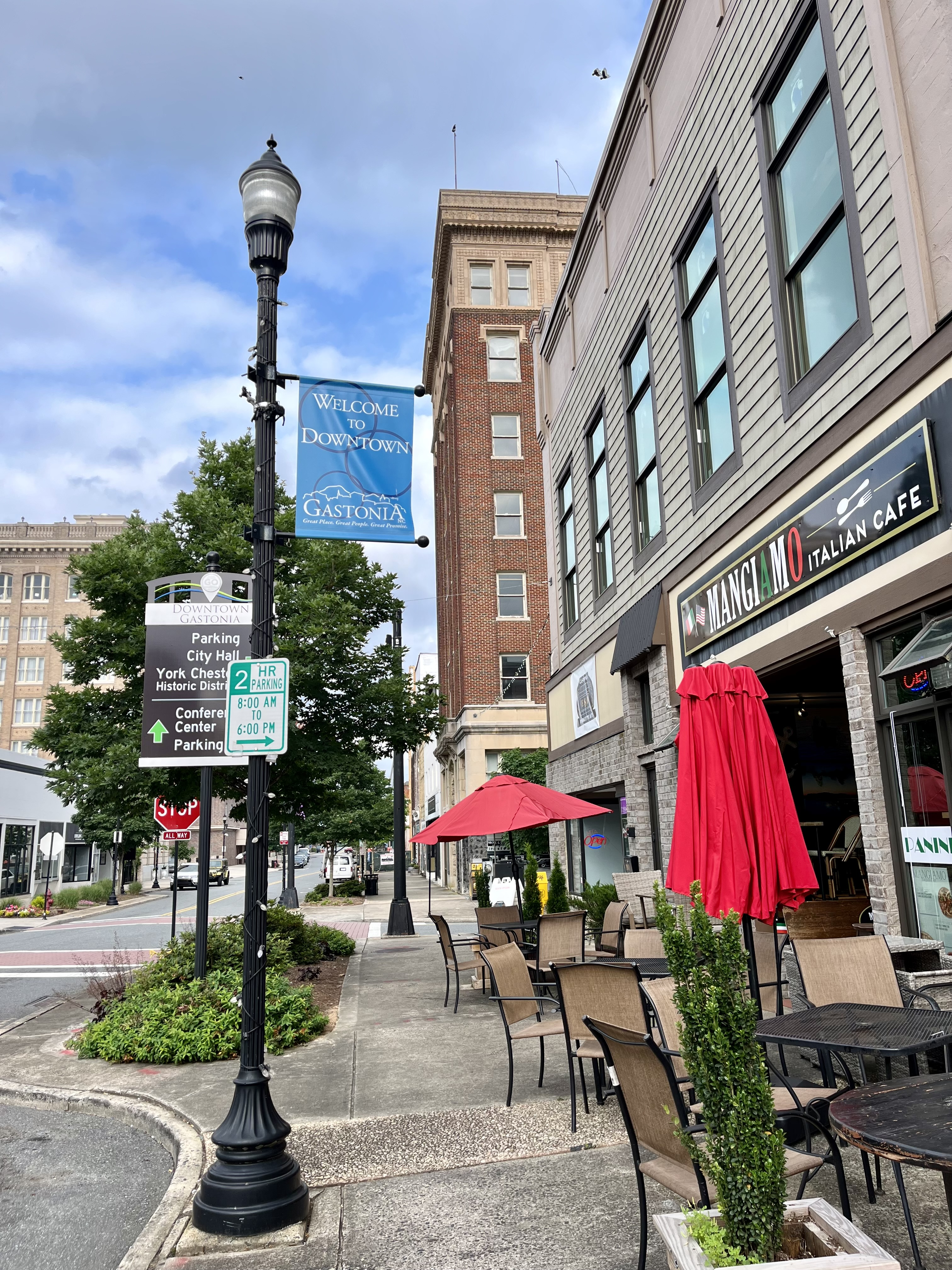
Storefronts on West Main Avenue

Gastonia and the surrounding areas feature several notable attractions.

The Schiele Museum of Natural History features a number of permanent exhibits, including the Hall of North Carolina Natural History and the Henry Hall of the American Indian. The museum is also home to the James H. Lynn Planetarium, the only planetarium in the Charlotte area.

The Daniel Stowe Conservancy is located just southeast of the city in Belmont on NC 279.

The U.S. National Whitewater Center (on the Catawba River) is located east of the city in neighboring Mecklenburg County.

Crowders Mountain State Park is located west of the city, near Kings Mountain. The park offers a number of hiking trails, as well as campgrounds, picnic areas, rock climbing, and fishing.

=== Retail ===
Eastridge Mall, located at exit 20 on North New Hope Road, is the only indoor regional mall in the area. The mall is home to two anchors and over 80 specialty stores, a full-service food court and other services.

Downtown Gastonia Historic District has undergone a revitalization with many locally owned businesses. This has created a unique atmosphere of local shopping experiences with events centered around the community.

There are also a few more shopping centers across the city with other well-known national and local retailers.

== Sports ==
The Gastonia Ghost Peppers of the Atlantic League of Professional Baseball, a partner of Major League Baseball, began to play in 2024 at CaroMont Health Park, which is part of the Franklin Urban Sports and Entertainment (FUSE) District. The Gastonia Honey Hunters, also in the Atlantic League, played there from 2021 to 2023. Before the Honey Hunters' arrival, the Gastonia Grizzlies, a Coastal Plain League summer collegiate wood-bat team, played at Sims Legion Park from 2002 to 2020.

Gastonia was home to minor league baseball, hosting the Gastonia Cardinals. The Cardinals played as members of the Class D level 1938 North Carolina State League and the Tar Heel League in 1939 and 1940, winning the 1939 league championship. Decades later, a second Cardinals team played from 1977 to 1982 as members of the Class A level Western Carolinas League and South Atlantic League, winning the 1977 league championship. The Cardinals teams hosted home games from 1938 to 1940 at the Gastonia High School Stadium and Sims Legion Park.

The Gastonia Gargoyles play rugby at Gaston County's North Belmont Park. The team is part of the Carolinas Geographical Union (CGU) and plays Division IV men's social rugby. The club plays in the fall (August - November) and spring (Feb - May) seasons. The club also hosts an annual rugby 7's tournament in Clover, South Carolina, during the Clover Scottish Games on the first or second Saturday in June.

Gastonia's two roller derby teams are the G*Force (senior team) and Mini*Gs (junior team). Bouts take place at Kate's Skating Rink on Hudson Blvd.

== Government ==
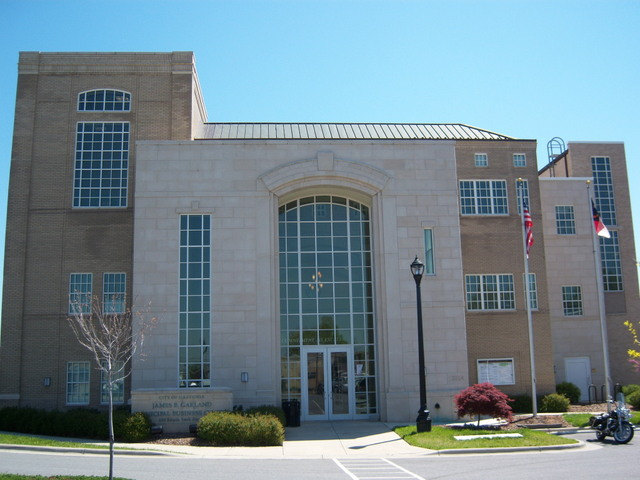
Gastonia City Hall (James B. Garland Municipal Business Center)

=== Law enforcement ===
The city is served by the Gastonia Police Department, the Gaston County Police Department, and the Gaston County Sheriff's Office. Additionally, the Gaston College Police has jurisdiction over the city, but rarely patrols outside of the Gaston College campus.

=== Fire and rescue ===
The Gastonia Fire Department established in 1901 is led by Chief Phil Welch. The FD consists of eight fire stations spread throughout the communities within the City limits. The Gastonia Fire Department maintains 145 full-time firefighters working 3 24-hour shifts. The Life Safety division has a Fire Marshal and four inspectors, the Administration consists of the Fire Chief, Deputy Chief, Assistant Chief, Training Chief, and two Administrative assistants.

Gaston County EMS (GEMS) is the county ambulance service.

== Education ==
=== K–12 ===
All public K–12 schools in Gaston County, including the city of Gastonia, are part of the Gaston County Schools (GCS). GCS operates schools at the elementary, middle, and high school levels.

There are five public high schools in Gastonia: Ashbrook High School, Forestview High School, Hunter Huss High School, Highland School of Technology, and Warlick Academy, the alternative placement school. Students from outlying parts of Gastonia also attend Stuart W. Cramer High School, North Gaston High School, and Bessemer City High School.

Private schools are also available in the city. Gaston Day School and Gaston Christian School are among various private schools offered in the Gastonia area.

Gastonia also has a charter school, Piedmont Community Charter School, that serves K–12 grade students. Currently the school has an Elementary campus along with a Secondary campus. A new High School campus is presently under construction. The new campus is set to open for the 2020–2021 school year.

=== College and university ===
Although there are no colleges or universities within the city limits of Gastonia, higher education is well represented in the greater Gastonia area. Gaston County is home to Belmont Abbey College (Belmont; four-year) and Gaston College (Dallas, Lincolnton (Lincoln County), and Belmont; two-year).

=== Library ===
The Gaston County Public Library has three locations in the city.

== Media ==
=== Newspaper ===
The Gaston Gazette is Gastonia's main newspaper. It is published daily, and covers Gastonia city, Gaston County, and surrounding areas. The Charlotte Observer (North Carolina's largest newspaper) is also available, citywide.

=== Radio ===
Gastonia is served by numerous FM and AM radio stations, mainly based in nearby Charlotte. The city has one licensed AM station: WGNC 1450 AM; it has two licensed FM stations: WGNC 101.1FM and WBAV 101.9 FM.

== Infrastructure ==
=== Transportation ===
==== Highways and major city thoroughfares ====
Interstate 85 (I-85) links Gastonia directly with Charlotte, Greensboro, Durham, and Petersburg/Richmond (to the northeast) and Spartanburg, Greenville, Atlanta and Montgomery (to the southwest). Gastonia's transportation network is supplemented by one additional freeway (US 321), the freeway portion of which directly connects Gastonia with transcontinental I-40 and the city of Hickory, 35 miles (56 km) north of Gastonia.

Gastonia is also served by three federal highways: US 29, US 74 (US 29 and US 74 follow the same route through the city), and US 321. US 29 parallels I-85 through the Carolinas, while US 74 provides direct east–west links to Charlotte and Wilmington (east), and Asheville and Cherokee (to the west). US 321 links Gastonia to central South Carolina and the Blue Ridge Mountains in northwest North Carolina. State highways include: NC 7, NC 274, NC 275 and NC 279.

Franklin Boulevard, Garrison Boulevard, Hudson Boulevard and Ozark/Long/Airline/Gaston Avenues are major east–west city thoroughfares. New Hope Road, Chester Street/York Road, and Marietta Street/Dr. Martin Luther King, Jr. Way, are major north–south city thoroughfares.

==== Bus (local) ====
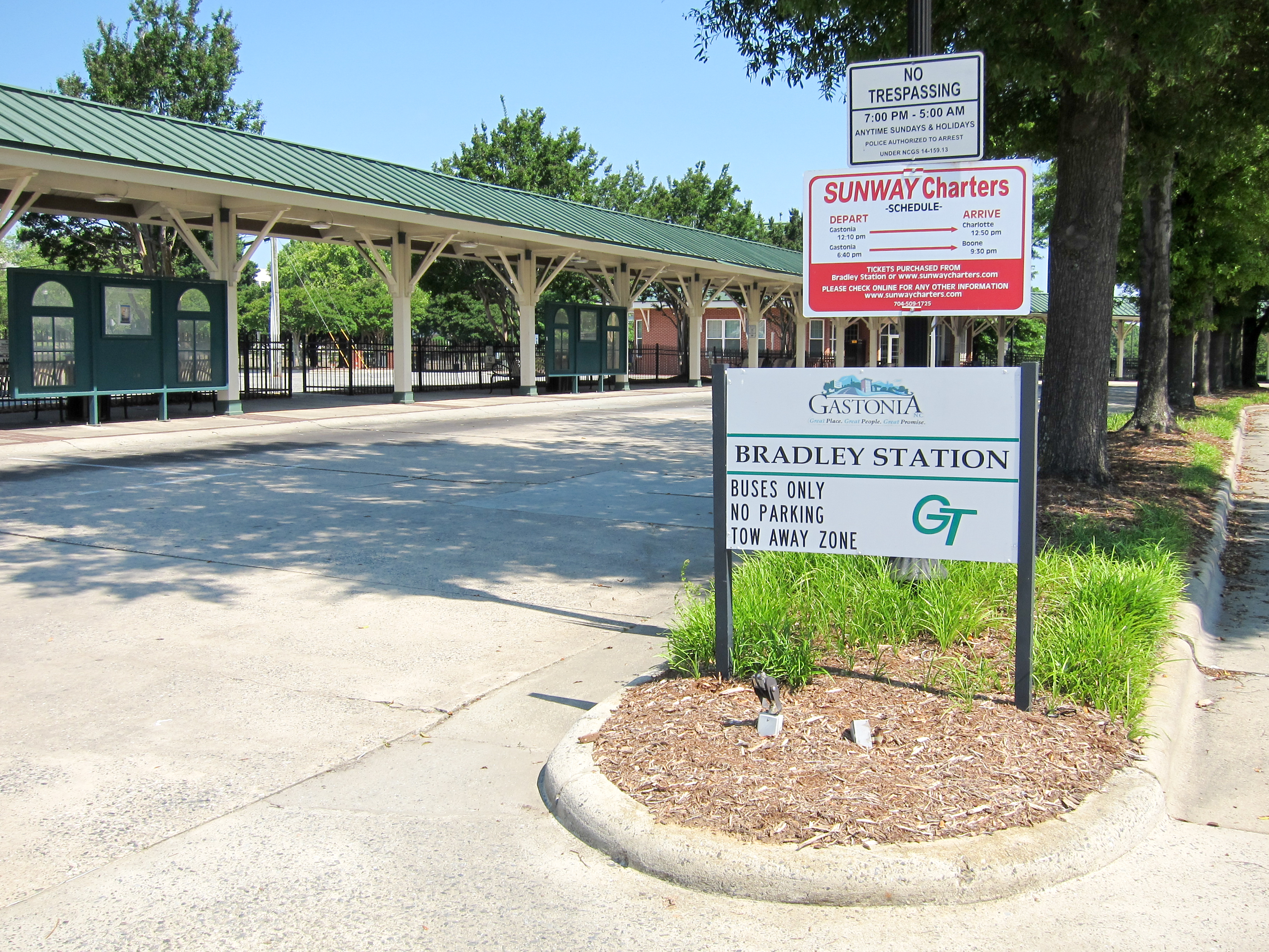
Bradley Station city bus station

Gastonia Transit (GT) is Gastonia's city transit provider. The bus service operates on a fixed-route system covering most of the city and stops are clearly visible around town. Buses run Monday-Saturday, and transfer downtown Gastonia at the Bradley Station. Regular fare is $1.00, transfers are free.

==== Bus (regional) ====
Charlotte Area Transit System (CATS) is Gastonia's commuter provider to Charlotte. The Gastonia Express (Route 85X) offers Monday-Friday bus service to/from uptown Charlotte, via the Bradley Station. One-way fare to/from uptown Charlotte is $4.40; transfer is free when transferring to any other CATS services.

==== Bus (national) ====
Greyhound Lines serves the city. Alongside Gastonia Transit, Greyhound utilizes downtown's Bradley Station.

==== Rail (Amtrak) ====
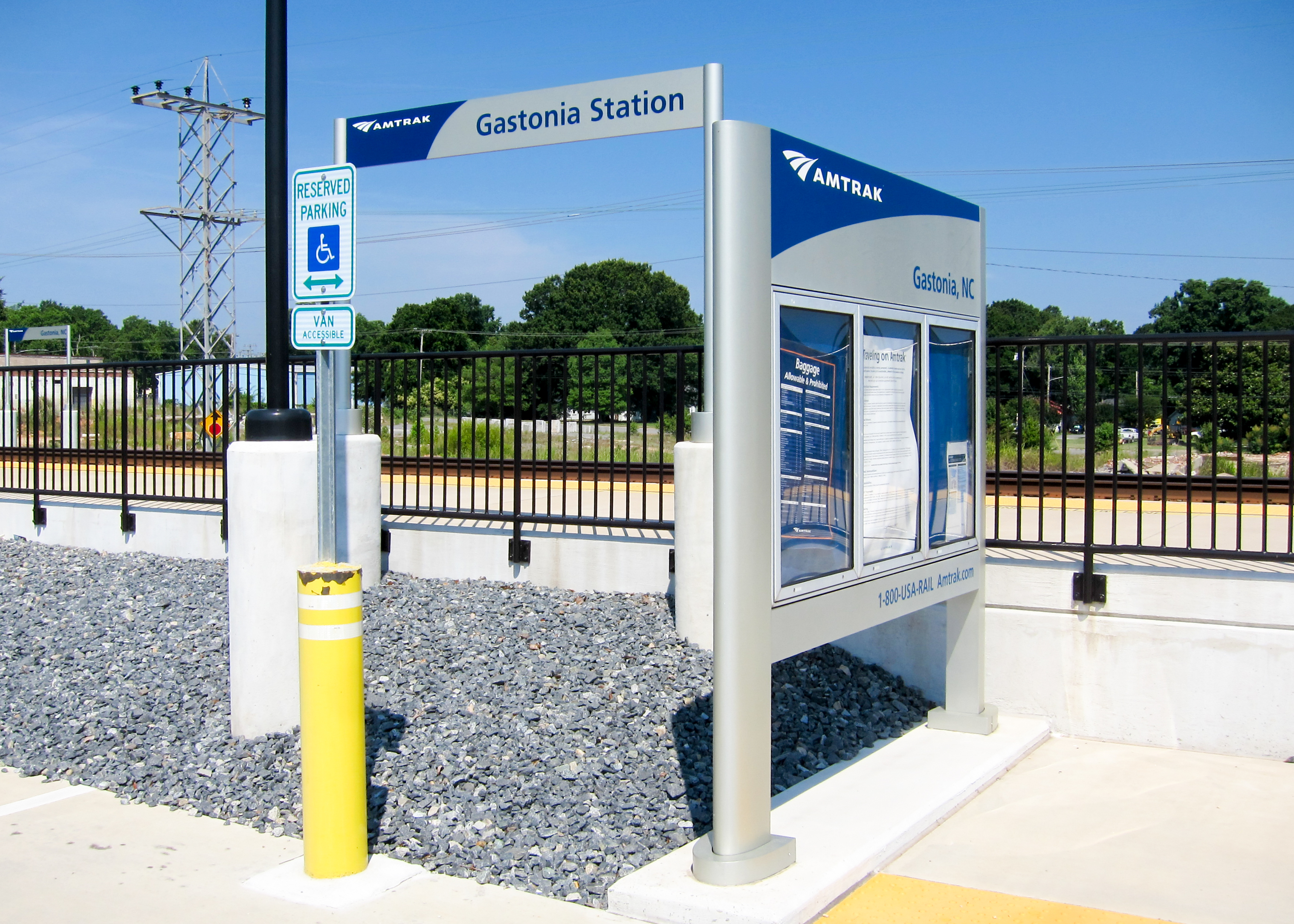
Gastonia Amtrak station

Amtrak's Crescent (trains 19, 20) connects Gastonia (GAS) with the cities of (to the north) New York, Philadelphia, Baltimore, Washington, and Charlotte, and (to the south) Atlanta, Birmingham, and New Orleans. The unstaffed Amtrak station is situated at 350 Hancock Street.

==== Airports ====
General service: Gastonia Municipal Airport (AKH) handles most of the city's private air service needs. It is located in the southeast part of the city on Gaston Day School Road, off NC 274 (Union Road).

Commercial service: Charlotte/Douglas International Airport (CLT) provides the city with a major domestic/international gateway and is located 18 miles (29 km) east, in Charlotte. American Airlines has the airline's second largest hub operation at Charlotte.

== Notable people ==
- Darrell Armstrong, NBA player
- Ezra Armstrong, soccer player
- R. B. Babington, businessman, telecommunications pioneer, banker, and alderman of Gastonia
- John T. Biggers, African-American muralist
- Wally Bryson, Lead guitarist of the pop group The Raspberries, born in Gastonia
- Cliff Cash, stand-up comedian
- Wiley Cash, author
- Clyde Caldwell, fantasy artist
- R. Gregg Cherry, 61st Governor of the state of North Carolina from 1945 to 1949
- Rufus Crawford, NFL and CFL player
- Crash Davis, MLB player who graduated from Gastonia HS
- Glenn Dunaway, NASCAR driver
- Harold Dunaway, NASCAR driver
- Fred Durst, frontman and lyricist of the nu metal group Limp Bizkit
- Eric "Sleepy" Floyd, NBA player
- Jamie Fraley, missing woman
- Gary M. Green, musician, author, television host, gaming consultant and entrepreneur
- Leonard Hamilton, Florida State University men's basketball head coach; born in Gastonia
- Sylvia Hatchell, women's basketball coach (University of North Carolina at Chapel Hill)
- Wesley Ray "Wes" Helms, MLB player
- Lamar Holmes, NFL player
- Charlie Hughes, inventor and audio engineer
- Billy James, radio talk show host of The John Boy and Billy Show
- Evan Karagias, wrestler and actor
- Buddy Lewis, MLB player
- Lillian M. Lowery, Superintendent of the Maryland State Department of Education, born in Gastonia
- Jessica Lunsford, murder victim, born in Gastonia
- Mel Melton, musician and chef
- Kevin Millwood, MLB pitcher
- Joe Pacheco, MMA fighter
- Buddy Parrott, NASCAR crew chief
- Ricky Rainey, UFC fighter
- Marshall Rauch, longest-serving Jewish state Senator in North Carolina history
- Diane Ray, singer of the early 1960s
- Mary Reynolds, baseball player in the All-American Girls Professional Baseball League
- Dave Robbins, college basketball coach and NCAA Hall of Fame member
- Koren Robinson, professional football player
- Lionel Shriver, author of We Need to Talk About Kevin
- Michal Smolen, slalom canoeist and Olympian
- Thomas Sowell, political commentator and economist; born in Gastonia, raised in New York City
- Melvin Stewart, former world record-holder in swimming who won two Olympic gold medals and one bronze
- Harold Varner III, professional golfer
- Hassan Whiteside, NBA player
- James Worthy, NBA player and member of Basketball Hall of Fame

== Sister cities ==
Gastonia has two sister cities:

- Gotha, Thuringia, Germany
- Santiago de Surco, Lima, Peru

Gotha was Gastonia's first sister city in 1994. Santiago de Surco became an official partner in March 2004. Mayor Jennie Stultz visited Gotha in 2007. In December 2007, the mayor of Santiago de Surco visited for the annual lighting of the Christmas tree in the Rotary Pavilion. He was invited to light the tree along with one of the city's councilmen.

== See also ==
- List of municipalities in North Carolina
- Garden Parkway, formerly proposed toll road in south Gaston and Mecklenburg counties
