= National Register of Historic Places listings in Gaston County, North Carolina =

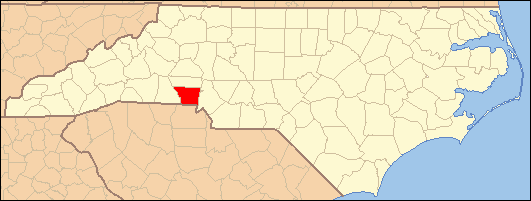

This list includes properties and districts listed on the National Register of Historic Places in Gaston County, North Carolina. Click the "Map of all coordinates" link to the right to view an online map of all properties and districts with latitude and longitude coordinates in the table below.

== Current listings ==
This National Park Service list is complete through NPS recent listings posted March 14, 2025.

	Name on the Register	Image	Date listed	Location	City or town	Description
1	Beam's Shell Service Station and Office, (Former)	Beam's Shell Service Station and Office, (Former)	October 17, 1997 (#97001221)	117 N. Mountain St. 35°22′47″N 81°22′48″W	Cherryville	
2	Belmont Abbey Cathedral	Belmont Abbey Cathedral	April 11, 1973 (#73001343)	On SR 2093; 35°15′43″N 81°02′36″W	Belmont	
3	Belmont Abbey Historic District	Belmont Abbey Historic District	July 14, 1993 (#93000584)	100 Belmont-Mt. Holly Rd. (NC 2093, east side); 35°15′41″N 81°02′34″W	Belmont	
4	Belmont Historic District	Belmont Historic District	December 27, 1996 (#96001525)	Roughly bounded by Sacred Heart College campus, RR line, N. and S. Main, Glenway, Bryant Sts., Keener Blvd., Central Ave; 35°14′33″N 81°02′22″W	Belmont	
5	Belmont Hosiery Mill		September 16, 2002 (#02000987)	608 S. Main St. 35°14′15″N 81°02′54″W	Belmont	
6	Bessemer City Downtown Historic District	Bessemer City Downtown Historic District	May 19, 2014 (#14000228)	Roughly bounded by 13th & E. Alabama Sts., E. & W. Virginia, E. Alabama & W. Pennsylvania Aves. 35°17′02″N 81°17′03″W	Bessemer City	
7	Andrew Carpenter House	Andrew Carpenter House	March 17, 1983 (#83001883)	SR 1820; 35°23′19″N 81°03′07″W	Lucia	
8	Central School	Central School	January 9, 2008 (#07001374)	317 Washington Ave. 35°17′05″N 81°16′36″W	Bessemer City	
9	Cherryville Downtown Historic District	Cherryville Downtown Historic District	August 17, 2016 (#16000560)	Main, Mountain, 1st, S. Jacob, S. Oak & N. Mulberry Sts. 35°22′44″N 81°22′46″W	Cherryville	
10	City Hospital-Gaston Memorial Hospital	City Hospital-Gaston Memorial Hospital	December 7, 2011 (#11000889)	401-405 N. Highland St., 810 W. Mauney Ave. 35°16′10″N 81°11′40″W	Gastonia	
11	Craig Farmstead		April 19, 2006 (#06000292)	118 Craigland Ln. 35°10′50″N 81°06′26″W	Gastonia	
12	Dallas Graded and High School	Dallas Graded and High School	May 2, 2002 (#02000441)	300 W. Church St. 35°18′52″N 81°10′46″W	Dallas	
13	Dallas Historic District	Dallas Historic District	July 26, 1973 (#73001344)	Bounded by Holland, Main, Gaston and Trade Sts.; also all or portions of Balthis, North Cedar, West Church, North Hoffman, Lewis, West Main, North Maple, McSwain, North and South Oakland, South Pine, Puett, West Trade, West Wilkins and Worth Sts., Brookgreen and Queens Drs. 35°18′58″N 81°10′35″W	Dallas	Second set of addresses represent a boundary increase approved April 13, 2022.
14	Downtown Gastonia Historic District	Downtown Gastonia Historic District	January 6, 2004 (#03001375)	Roughly bounded by Main Ave., Broad St., Second Ave., and Chester St. 35°15′41″N 81°10′56″W	Gastonia	
15	Downtown Mount Holly Historic District	Downtown Mount Holly Historic District	April 24, 2012 (#12000236)	100 blocks of N. & S. Main Sts. & W. Central Ave. 35°17′52″N 81°00′58″W	Mount Holly	
16	First National Bank Building	First National Bank Building	February 20, 1986 (#86000302)	168-170 W. Main Ave. 35°15′49″N 81°10′59″W	Gastonia	
17	Flint Mill No. 2 - Burlington Industries, Inc. Plant		April 19, 2023 (#100008852)	1910 Hunt Ave. 35°16′32″N 81°09′08″W	Gastonia	
18	Former U.S. Post Office	Former U.S. Post Office	November 29, 1995 (#95001401)	115 N. Main St. 35°14′37″N 81°02′18″W	Belmont	
19	Gaston County Courthouse	Gaston County Courthouse	May 10, 1979 (#79001708)	N. York and S. South Sts. 35°15′47″N 81°11′04″W	Gastonia	
20	Gastonia High School	Gastonia High School	March 17, 1983 (#83001884)	S. York St. 35°15′10″N 81°11′19″W	Gastonia	
21	Hoyle House	Hoyle House	October 21, 1993 (#93001140)	NC 275 south side, 1,400 feet (430 m) southwest of the south fork of the Catawba River; 35°19′36″N 81°08′17″W	Dallas	
22	Eli Hoyle House	Eli Hoyle House	December 17, 1998 (#98001529)	1111 Dallas-Stanley Hwy; 35°19′37″N 81°08′28″W	Dallas	
23	David Jenkins House		February 17, 1978 (#78001956)	1017 Church St. 35°15′58″N 81°09′59″W	Gastonia	Burned July 1987
24	Loray Mill Historic District	Loray Mill Historic District	October 19, 2001 (#01001131)	Roughly bounded by W. Franklin Blvd., S. Vance and S. Trenton Sts., and W. 6th Ave. B; also roughly bounded by S. Vance St., the railroad right-of-way, S. Hill St., and W. Franklin Boulevard; 35°15′31″N 81°11′51″W	Gastonia	Second set of boundaries represents a boundary increase of April 5, 2006
25	Mayworth School	Mayworth School	September 16, 2002 (#02000986)	236 Eighth Ave. 35°14′26″N 81°04′32″W	Cramerton	
26	McAdenville Historic District	McAdenville Historic District	February 5, 2009 (#08001412)	100-413 Main St., Elm and Poplar Sts., and cross sts. from I-85 to S. Fork of Catawba River; 35°15′38″N 81°04′51″W	McAdenville	
27	Mount Holly Cotton Mill		August 1, 1996 (#96000830)	250 N. Main St. 35°18′02″N 81°00′54″W	Mount Holly	
28	Robinson-Gardner Building	Robinson-Gardner Building	April 9, 1999 (#99000436)	173-175 W. Main Ave. 35°15′49″N 81°11′00″W	Gastonia	
29	St. Joseph's Catholic Church	St. Joseph's Catholic Church	June 7, 1979 (#79001709)	Off NC 273; 35°20′12″N 81°00′01″W	Mountain Island	
30	Seaboard Air Line Railway Depot	Seaboard Air Line Railway Depot	December 20, 2016 (#16000878)	105 N. Depot St. 35°22′52″N 81°22′29″W	Cherryville	
31	Stanley Mills		December 8, 2022 (#100008466)	357, 361 North Main, 100 West Parkwood and 111 West Church Sts. 35°21′44″N 81°05′51″W	Stanley	
32	Third National Bank Building	Third National Bank Building	February 20, 1986 (#86000316)	195 W. Main Ave. 35°15′49″N 81°11′02″W	Gastonia	
33	Trenton Cotton Mills	Trenton Cotton Mills	November 3, 2020 (#100005748)	612 West Main Ave. 35°15′49″N 81°11′31″W	Gastonia	
34	William J. Wilson House	William J. Wilson House	October 14, 1976 (#76001324)	South of Gastonia off SR 1109; 35°09′50″N 81°13′13″W	Gastonia	
35	Woodlawn Mill		December 18, 2023 (#100009626)	300 Woodlawn Avenue; 35°18′12″N 81°01′07″W	Mount Holly	
36	York-Chester Historic District	York-Chester Historic District	September 1, 2005 (#05000941)	Bounded by W. Franklin Boulevard, W. 2nd Ave., South St., W. 10th Ave., W. 8th Ave. and S. Clay St. 35°15′18″N 81°11′27″W	Gastonia	

== See also ==
- National Register of Historic Places listings in North Carolina
- List of National Historic Landmarks in North Carolina
