= Hoyle House =

Hoyle House may refer to:

- Hoyle Historic Homestead, also known as Peter Hoyle House, in Gaston County, North Carolina, listed on the National Register of Historic Places (NRHP)
- Eli Hoyle House, a historic plantation house located near Dallas, also in Gaston County, North Carolina, also NRHP-listed
