= WSGE =

Dallas, North Carolina; United States
- Broadcast area: Charlotte metropolitan area
- Frequency: 91.7 MHz
- Branding: WSGE 91.7

Programming
- Format: Album Adult Alternative
- Affiliations: NPR

Ownership
- Owner: Gaston College

History
- First air date: October 1980

Technical information
- Licensing authority: FCC
- Class: C2
- ERP: 7,500 watts
- HAAT: 260 meters (853 ft)
- Transmitter coordinates: 35°24′26″N 81°07′48″W

Links
- Public license information: Public file; LMS
- Webcast: Live Stream
- Website: www.wsge.org

WSGE (91.7 MHz) is a non-commercial, public radio station in Dallas, North Carolina, and serving the Charlotte metropolitan area. It is owned by Gaston College and run by a staff of professionals, students and volunteers. It has an adult album alternative (AAA) radio format. The station seeks donations from listeners and local business, holding periodic on-air fundraisers. The radio studios and offices are inside room number 114 of the Craig Arts & Sciences Building on the campus of the college on Highway 321 South in Dallas.

WSGE has an effective radiated power (ERP) of 7,500 watts. Its transmitter is off Hipp Road in Alexis, North Carolina, near North Carolina Highway 27. The signal covers 26 North and South Carolina counties with a population of 1.3 million residents.

== Programming ==
WSGE identifies itself as "Your Independent Music Source 91.7." A large portion of its music programming consists of Adult Album Alternative (AAA) music with emphasis on local, independent musicians and live in-studio performances. Other programming includes beach music, folk music, blues. soul music, Southern gospel music and R&B. The syndicated show World Cafe airs at 2pm and 10pm on weekdays.

Hourly newscasts are supplied by National Public Radio (NPR) with an hour of Morning Edition heard weekdays at 5 a.m.

== History ==
WSGE signed on the air in October 1980, originally with an effective radiated power of 3,000 watts on a 200 foot tower. In January 2005, the college approved a lease with Clear Channel Communications (now iHeartMedia) for space on the company's nearby tall tower. The transmitting antenna now has a height above average terrain (HAAT) of 260 meters (853 feet).

With approval from the Federal Communications Commission (FCC), on June 27, 2005, the station increased its power to 6,000 watts. On September 26, 2006, the FCC granted permission to WSGE to increase its power again to 7,500 watts.
