= Bessemer City, North Carolina =

- City
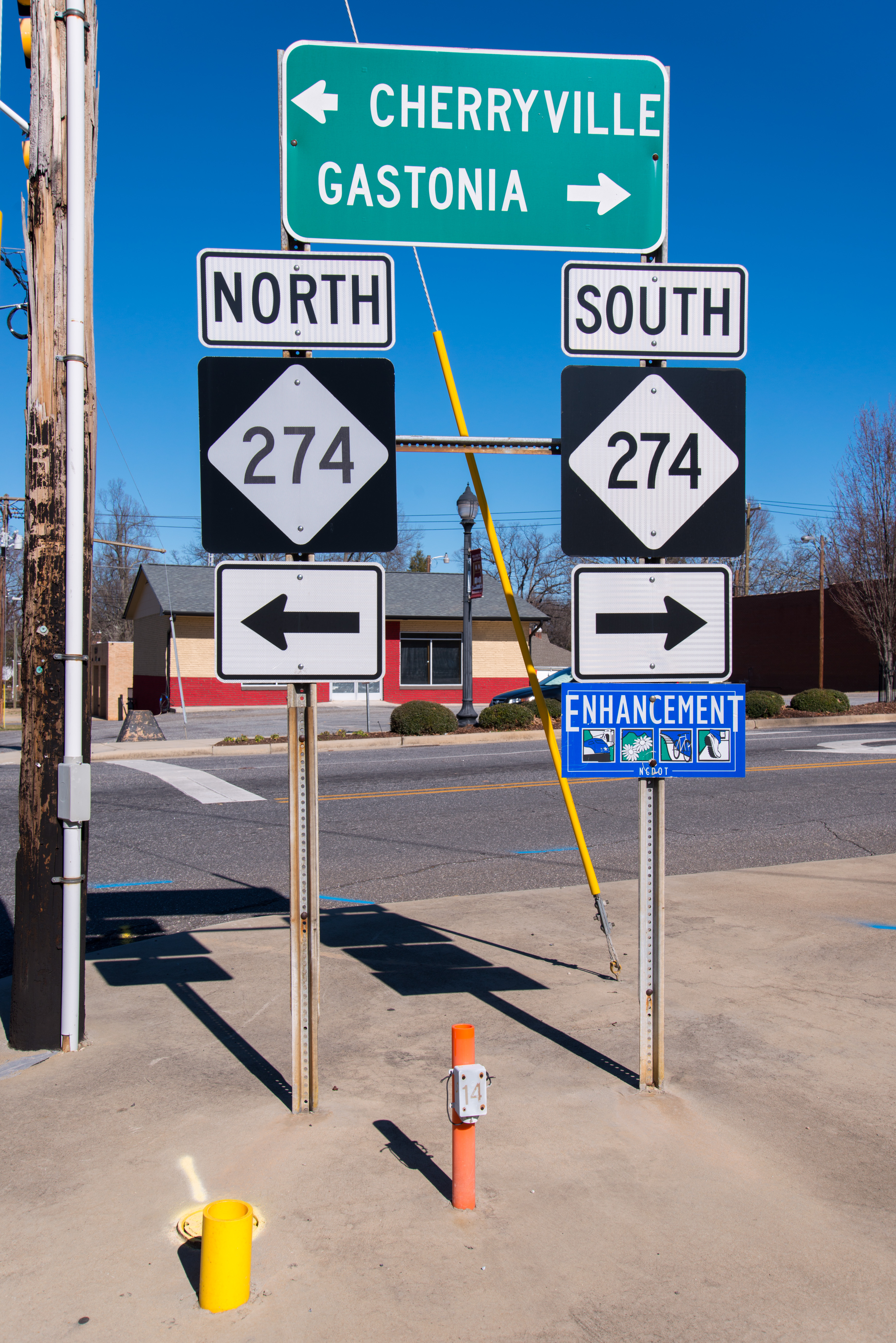
- Directional signs of NC 274, at the end of NC 161, in Bessemer City
- Nickname: City with a Heart
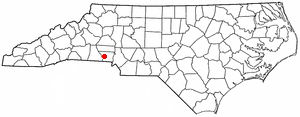
- Location of Bessemer City, North Carolina
- Coordinates: 35°17′03″N 81°16′58″W
- Country: United States
- State: North Carolina
- County: Gaston
- Incorporated: March 6, 1893

Government
  - Type: Council-Manager
  - Mayor: Becky Smith

Area
  - Total: 5.26 sq mi (13.63 km^{2})
  - Land: 5.22 sq mi (13.53 km^{2})
  - Water: 0.039 sq mi (0.10 km^{2})
- Elevation: 902 ft (275 m)

Population (2020)
  - Total: 5,428
  - Density: 1,038.8/sq mi (401.08/km^{2})
- Time zone: UTC-5 (Eastern (EST))
  - Summer (DST): UTC-4 (EDT)
- ZIP code: 28016
- Area code: 704
- FIPS code: 37-05220
- GNIS feature ID: 2403865
- Website: www.bessemercity.com

Bessemer City is a small suburban city in Gaston County, North Carolina, United States. As of the 2020 census, Bessemer City had a population of 5,428. The city is approximately 6 miles (10 km) northwest of Gastonia and 25 miles (40 km) west of Charlotte. It was settled in 1756 and founded in 1893.

== Geography ==
According to the United States Census Bureau, the city has a total area of 4.8 square miles (12.5 km^{2}), of which 4.8 square miles (12.4 km^{2}) is land and 0.039 square miles (0.1 km^{2}), or 0.78%, is water. The elevation at city hall is 904 feet (276 m) above sea level.

== History ==
Bessemer City is named for Sir Henry Bessemer who created the Bessemer process for smelting iron. Bessemer City was founded on land purchased from the Ormand family, near the Sloan-Washington-Ormand Iron Furnace, but the Bessemer Process made Bessemer City's early iron smelting industry obsolete.

The earliest European settlement in the Bessemer City area dates to 1754, when King George II of Great Britain granted about 2,000 acres (8.1 km^{2}) to James Ormand (1716–1771), who established the Ormand Mining Company to extract iron ore. By 1786, a furnace had been built on the land, called the Washington Furnace after the family of Colonel John C. Washington. The Old Ormand Furnace was used to process most of the iron ore that was mined in the area and today is one of the oldest remaining furnaces in the country. Despite a local tale that cannonballs were made during the Revolutionary War, there is no proof the furnace was built that early. The furnace was sold and later bought back by the family of Zenas Stanhope Ormand (b. July 12, 1802 – d. July 28, 1878). The furnace made iron implements and other products for local and statewide use and was in operation until the mid-19th century (when the Bessemer process made small furnace operations uneconomical). The "Old Furnace" is still owned by the Ormand Family Foundation, and the site is used as a gathering place for the Ormand, Ormond Family Reunion, one of the oldest family reunions in America, held annually since 1897.

During the late 1840s, corn and cotton were the region's two main crops. Whiskey production was also profitable. Gaston County had more licensed whiskey distilleries than any county in North Carolina.

In 1871, the Atlanta & Charlotte Division of the Richmond & Danville Railroad Company built through Gaston County. Laying the track through Whetstone Mountain, located west of modern-day Bessemer City, was considered a great engineering accomplishment. John Wooten built a general store next to the railroad on the site of present-day Bessemer City and called the store and depot "Wooten's Station".

In 1891, John Askew Smith, previously of Reidsville, North Carolina, moved with his wife Fannie and brother-in-law, John A. Pinchback, to Gaston County. Smith purchased 1,700 acres (6.9 km^{2}) and wanted to establish a town to the east of Whetstone Mountain. By 1893, Smith and other residents petitioned the North Carolina legislature to incorporate the town. On March 6, 1893, Bessemer City was officially chartered. Smith hired W. R. Richardson, an engineer from Guilford County, to lay out the town. In 1896 Smith built the first luxurious home in the area he named "Long View" where he lived with his wife for nearly 20 years. This house still stands in pristine condition, and the Mitchell family has taken up its stewardship. Smith's "Highacre" house, built in the early 20th century, is now occupied by the Eury family.

The population of Bessemer City at the time of its charter was very small, with only a few families, but by 1900 it had grown to between 500 and 600 people. In 1895, Stonewall Jackson Durham and John M. Odell incorporated Southern Cotton Mills and as their first venture completed and opened the failed Smith/Pinchback Mill. A series of textile mills opened by Smith and Pinchback; Durham and Odell; Frank, Robert and Max Goldberg; as well as the Ragan Spinning Company, gave Bessemer City its industrial foundation.

In 1929 Textile mill striker and songwriter Ella Mae Wiggins, 29, the mother of nine, was killed when local vigilantes, thugs and a sheriff's deputy force the pickup truck in which she was riding off the road and begin shooting.

A native of Sevierville, Tennessee, Wiggins by 1926 settled in Gaston County, N.C., living in an African-American neighborhood outside Bessemer City known as Stumptown. Her neighbors would look after her children as she worked as a spinner at American Mill No. 2. According to an article published online by the North Carolina Museum of History, "she worked twelve-hour days, six days a week, earning about nine dollars a week."She became a bookkeeper for the union, which was Communist run, and traveled to Washington, D.C., to testify about labor practices in the South. She also told her story: "I’m the mother of nine. Four died with the whooping cough, all at once. I was working nights, I asked the super to put me on days, so’s I could tend ‘em when they had their bad spells. But he wouldn't. I don’t know why. ... So I had to quit, and then there wasn't no money for medicine, and they just died." She also sang her ballads, including her best-known song, "A Mill Mother’s Lament," which has been recorded by Pete Seeger, among others. Wiggins believed in organizing African-Americans along with whites, and in a close vote, her local NTWU branch voted to admit African-Americans to the union.

On September 14, 1929, she and other union members drove to a union meeting in Gastonia. They were met by an armed mob, and turned back. They had driven about five miles toward home when they were stopped by a car; armed men jumped out and began shooting. Wiggins was shot in the chest and killed. Her five children were sent to live in orphanages. Five Loray Mill employees were charged in Wiggins's murder but were acquitted after less than 30 minutes of deliberation in a trial in Charlotte in March 1930 despite the fact that the crime was committed in daylight and more than 50 people witnessed it. She was buried in the Bessemer City Cemetery on North 12th St. Hers is one of the biggest markers there, after being expanded by the AFL–CIO in 1979 to include a marker inscribed, "She died carrying the torch of social justice."

An historic Supreme Court case on sexism originated in Bessemer City in 1985. Anderson v. Bessemer City was a case involving a woman who sued the city after applying for a position and then not being chosen based solely on the fact that she was a woman. The Supreme Court found that discrimination was present in the decision. The factors that Phyllis Anderson showed the court to demonstrate that the hiring committee were sexists, because 1) Ms. Anderson was better qualified, 2) Testimony from one of the committee members that he thought the position would be "real hard" for a woman and that he wouldn't want his wife to perform such duties, 3) Ms. Anderson alone among the applicants was asked whether she realized that the job would involve night work and travel and whether her husband approved of her applying for the job, and 4) The reasons offered by the all-male hiring committee as to why they hired a less qualified man were pretextual.

The Bessemer City Downtown Historic District and Central School are listed on the National Register of Historic Places.

== Government of Bessemer City ==
Bessemer City operates a Council-Manager type of government. The City Council consists of six members elected from single member wards, and the Mayor. The Mayor serves as ex-officio chair of the council. The Council and Mayor are elected every two years with no term limits. The current mayor of Bessemer City is Becky S. Smith.

== Demographics ==
Historical population
Census	Pop.	Note	%±
1880	68		—
1900	1,100		—
1910	1,529		39.0%
1920	2,176		42.3%
1930	3,739		71.8%
1940	3,567		−4.6%
1950	3,961		11.0%
1960	4,017		1.4%
1970	4,991		24.2%
1980	4,787		−4.1%
1990	4,698		−1.9%
2000	5,119		9.0%
2010	5,340		4.3%
2020	5,428		1.6%
2025 (est.)	5,834	▲	7.5%
U.S. Decennial Census

=== 2020 census ===
As of the 2020 census, Bessemer City had a population of 5,428, and 1,363 families residing in the city.

The median age was 41.2 years. 21.1% of residents were under the age of 18 and 17.0% were 65 years of age or older. For every 100 females, there were 95.0 males, and for every 100 females age 18 and over there were 91.8 males age 18 and over.

97.2% of residents lived in urban areas, while 2.8% lived in rural areas.

There were 2,230 households, of which 29.6% had children under the age of 18 living in them. Of all households, 38.4% were married-couple households, 23.1% were households with a male householder and no spouse or partner present, and 31.9% were households with a female householder and no spouse or partner present. About 30.2% of all households were made up of individuals, and 13.2% had someone living alone who was 65 years of age or older.

There were 2,445 housing units, of which 8.8% were vacant. The homeowner vacancy rate was 1.7% and the rental vacancy rate was 9.6%.

Bessemer City racial composition
Race	Number	Percentage
White (non-Hispanic)	3,915	72.13%
Black or African American (non-Hispanic)	855	15.75%
Native American	29	0.53%
Asian	30	0.55%
Other/Mixed	249	4.59%
Hispanic or Latino	350	6.45%

=== 2000 census ===
As of the census of 2000, there were 5,119 people, 2,009 households, and 1,436 families residing in the city. The population density was 1,205.6 inhabitants per square mile (465.5/km^{2}). There were 2,149 housing units at an average density of 506.1 per square mile (195.4/km^{2}). The racial makeup of the city was 83.49% White, 13.42% African American, 0.31% Native American, 0.59% Asian, 1.04% from other races, and 1.15% from two or more races. Hispanic or Latino of any race were 3.50% of the population.

Ancestries:

- United States, 21.4%
- German, 8.7%
- Irish, 7.8%
- English 5.6%
- Scots-Irish, 2.0%
- Dutch, 1.7%

For population 25 years and over in Bessemer City:

- High school or higher: 68.6%
- Bachelor's degree or higher: 7.7%
- Graduate or professional degree: 2.4%
- Unemployed: 7.0%
- Mean travel time to work: 24.5 minutes

There were 2,009 households, out of which 33.1% had children under the age of 18 living with them, 50.9% were married couples living together, 15.5% had a female householder with no husband present, and 28.5% were non-families. 23.3% of all households were made up of individuals, and 9.4% had someone living alone who was 65 years of age or older. The average household size was 2.55 and the average family size was 2.98.

In the city, the population was spread out, with 25.6% under the age of 18, 9.5% from 18 to 24, 31.1% from 25 to 44, 21.9% from 45 to 64, and 11.9% who were 65 years of age or older. The median age was 34 years. For every 100 females, there were 91.8 males. For every 100 females age 18 and over, there were 89.1 males.

The median income for a household in the city was $33,826, and the median income for a family was $39,759. Males had a median income of $31,357 versus $23,133 for females. The per capita income for the city was $15,971. About 8.8% of families and 11.9% of the population were below the poverty line, including 15.5% of those under age 18 and 11.9% of those age 65 or over.

== Business and industry ==
One of the largest industries in Bessemer City is FMC Lithium, Inc., which operates out of Bessemer City Operations mine and is one of the largest producers of lithium in the world. Lithium is used in many products including pharmaceuticals, batteries, ceramics, and construction products. Advanced Drainage Systems, the largest polyethylene pipe and fittings manufacturer in the country, operates a 50,000-square-foot (4,600 m^{2}) facility in Bessemer City employing 100 people. Other manufacturers include Hunter Douglas (Designer Shades Division) and Dole. There is also still some agriculture in the form of Kiser's Dairy Farm, among others. In 2008, Kiser's dairy was converted into a farm for raising Angus beef cattle. Melvin Kiser is a descendant of one of the founding families of Bessemer City and he has about 200 animals.

== Education ==
The following schools serve the Bessemer City area and are part of the Gaston County Schools system.

- Bessemer City Primary School (Grades: K - 2)
- Bessemer City Central Elementary School (Grades: 3 - 5)
- Bessemer City Middle School (Grades: 6 - 8)
- Bessemer City High School (Grades: 9 - 12)

The Bessemer City Branch of the Gaston County Public Library serves this community.

== Notable people ==
- Phil Crosby, former NFL fullback
- Marshall Grant, American bassist
- James Ijames, American playwright, 2022 Pulitzer Prize for Drama winning playwright of Fat Ham
- Norris McCleary, former NFL defensive tackle
- Kevin Millwood, former MLB pitcher, All-Star selection in 1999 and AL ERA leader in 2005
- Freddy Smith, American racing driver
- Jimmy Wayne, country singer and songwriter
- Ella May Wiggins, martyr of the 1929 Loray Mill strike, lived in the Stumptown section of Bessemer City
