= Andrew Carpenter House =

Historic house in North Carolina, United States

- U.S. National Register of Historic Places
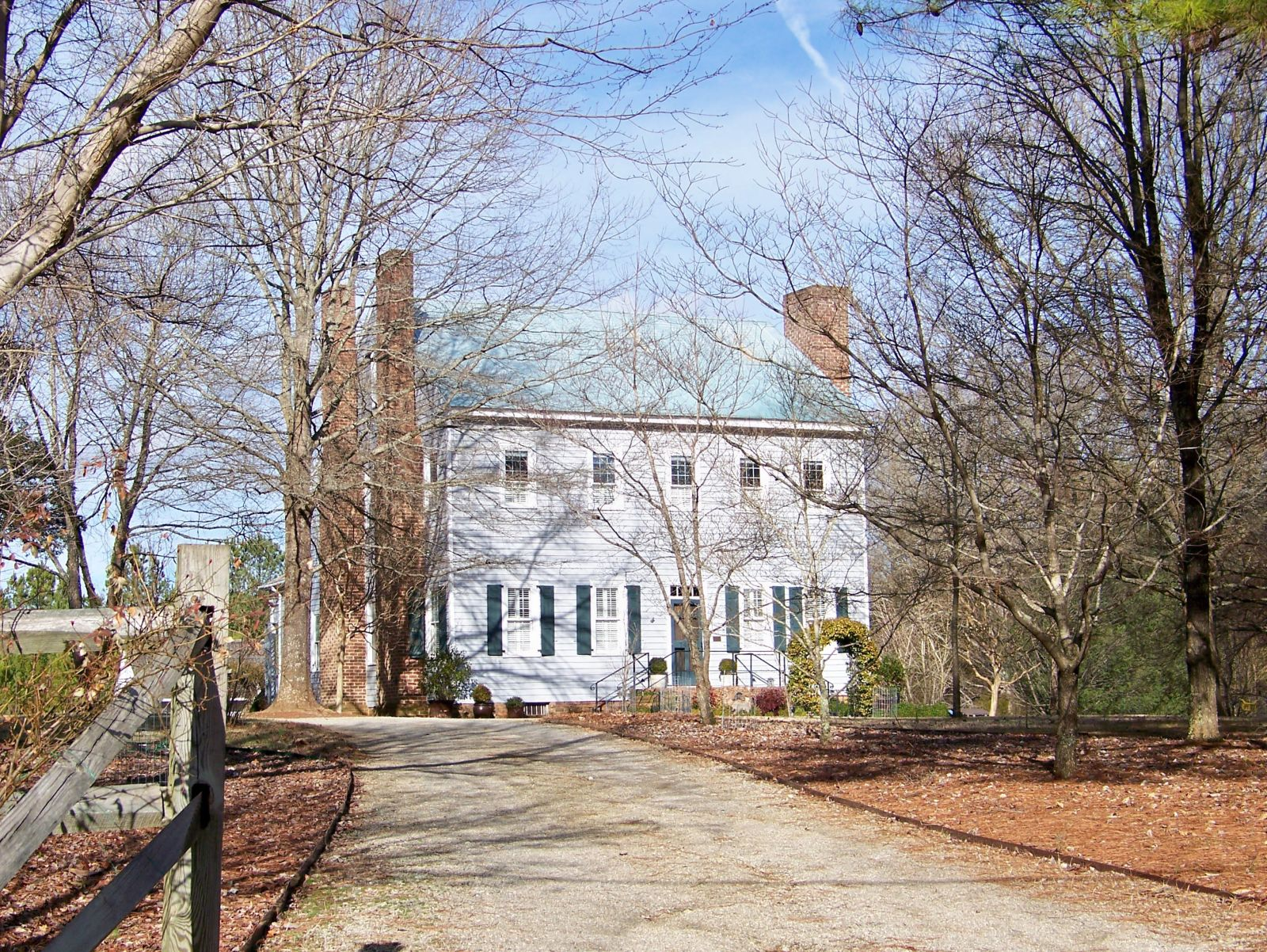

- Location within North Carolina Location within the United States
- Location: SR 1820, near Lucia, North Carolina
- Coordinates: 35°23′19″N 81°3′7″W
- Area: 13 acres (5.3 ha)
- Built: 1836
- Architectural style: Federal
- NRHP reference No.: 83001883
- Added to NRHP: March 17, 1983

The Andrew Carpenter House on State Road 1820 in Gaston County, North Carolina, is believed to have been built for Andrew Carpenter shortly after his marriage to Sophia Smith on April 19, 1831. The two-story Federal style plantation house is two rooms deep and has paired chimneys. It is one of the largest early-19th century houses in Gaston County.

The house was accessioned to the National Register of Historic Places on March 17, 1983. This referenced website has several excellent photographs of the house.
