= Gaston College =

Public college in Dallas, North Carolina, US

Coordinates: 35.3114061°N 81.1899071°W

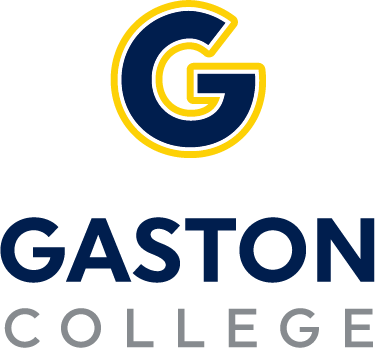
- Motto: "Opportunities for Life."
- Type: Public community college
- Established: 1963; 63 years ago
- Parent institution: North Carolina Community College System
- Accreditation: SACS
- Endowment: 6.01 million (2023)
- President: John Hauser
- Academic staff: 140 full-time, 220 part-time (2025)
- Total staff: 415 (2025)
- Students: 6,925 (2025)
- Location: Dallas Campus (Main) – Dallas, North Carolina, United States Lincoln Campus – Lincolnton, North Carolina, United States Kimbrell Campus – Belmont, North Carolina, United States
- Campus: 180 acres (all campuses combined); Multiple sites
- Colors: Blue and yellow
- Nickname: Rhinos
- Sporting affiliations: NJCAA
- Mascot: “Mo the Rhino”
- Website: www.gaston.edu

Gaston College is a public community college in Dallas, North Carolina. Serving Gaston County and Lincoln County, Gaston College enrolls over 5,000 students each term in curriculum programs and about 16,000 students in continuing education programs. It is part of the North Carolina Community College System and accredited by the Southern Association of Colleges and Schools to award associate degrees.

== History ==
Gaston College traces its origins to the Gaston Technical Institute, founded in 1952 under the School of Engineering at North Carolina State College (now North Carolina State University). The modern institution was chartered by the State of North Carolina on February 8, 1963, and began offering classes on September 23, 1964, with 19 faculty members and 445 students in temporary quarters, including the First United Methodist Church in Gastonia.

On November 27, 1964, the College moved to its permanent campus along Highway 321 in Dallas, North Carolina, although construction was still underway. The first commencement was held in May 1965, and shortly thereafter, Gaston College consolidated with Gaston Technical Institute and the Gastonia Industrial Education Center on July 1, 1965.

The College earned accreditation from the Southern Association of Colleges and Schools (SACS) in 1967, and in 1981, governance shifted to the newly formed North Carolina Board of Community Colleges. Over the following decades, Gaston College expanded beyond its original Dallas campus, adding the Lincoln Campus and the Kimbrell Campus and Textile Technology Center in Belmont. In 2005, the College absorbed the North Carolina Center for Applied Textile Technology, a state training center originally established in 1943 as the North Carolina Vocational Textile School.

Today, Gaston College serves approximately 20,000 students annually through over 100 degree, diploma, and certificate programs across three campuses and multiple specialized centers.

== Campus locations ==
Gaston College operates three campuses and one regional training facility:

- Dallas Campus (Main Campus) – Located in Dallas, Gaston County, the main campus consists of twelve buildings totaling more than 450,000 square feet (41,800 m²) of academic, administrative, and student facilities. The campus includes an internal road system, parking for over 2,000 vehicles, and space that is frequently used for community events. As a commuter institution, Gaston College does not offer on-campus housing. As of 2019, the Dallas Campus has no permanent dining facilities.
- Lincoln Campus – Gaston College first established a presence in Lincoln County in 1969 with the opening of the Lincoln Center. In 1987, operations were moved to the Lincoln County School of Technology in Lincolnton. The current Lincoln Campus opened in the renovated former Lincolnton High School, with classes beginning in Spring 1999. Expansion continued with the opening of the Cochrane Science and Technology Building in January 2009, a lower-level addition in 2011, and the launch of the College’s cosmetology program in January 2012.
- Kimbrell Campus and Textile Technology Center (Belmont) – The Belmont facility originated as the North Carolina Vocational Textile School (approved in 1941, opened in 1943) and was later renamed the North Carolina Center for Applied Textile Technology. In 2005, the center was transferred to Gaston College and renamed the W. Duke Kimbrell Campus and Textile Technology Center. The site provides product development, testing, training, and consulting services to the textile industry, along with continuing education and selected curriculum courses.
- Regional Emergency Services Training Center (Dallas Campus) – Situated on the Dallas Campus, this five-story specialized training facility supports the education of firefighters, police, and emergency medical personnel. The site includes nine propane and flammable liquid pits, allowing for hands-on training in controlled hazardous environments. The center enables Gaston College to provide advanced public safety instruction not previously available in the region.

== Athletics ==
Gaston College originally launched its athletic program in the mid-1960s, fielding teams in sports like basketball and baseball. The early basketball squads—nicknamed the Raiders (1964–65), Rebels (1965–69), and Warriors (1969–72)—quickly became a force in the North Carolina Community College Conference, advancing to the NJCAA Region X tournament in three consecutive seasons before the program was discontinued in 1972 due to financial constraints.

Nearly five decades later, the college revived intercollegiate sports under the leadership of President Dr. John Hauser. In late 2020, Guton College announced plans to launch programs in men’s baseball and basketball, women’s softball and beach volleyball, and e-sports, aiming to begin competition by 2022. The Board of Trustees gave unanimous approval, and Dr. Hauser submitted a letter of intent to the NJCAA, with hopes of varsity eligibility soon thereafter.

Since the relaunch, Gaston College Rhinos have competed in multiple NJCAA Division I sports. In the 2022–23 academic year, both the softball and baseball teams won regional titles, marking a successful return to competition. The school has also invested in improving athletic facilities, including plans for an on-campus gymnasium to support its growing programs.

Notably, Gaston College alumnus and legendary basketball coach Leonard Hamilton has been a vocal supporter. A star player during Gaston’s original basketball era (1966–68), Hamilton now offers insight and encouragement as the college rebuilds its athletic identity.

=== Mascot ===
The official mascot of Gaston College is Mo the Rhino, introduced in August 2021 during a campus Block Party hosted by President John Hauser. Chosen following mascot preference focus groups, the rhino symbolizes the strength, stamina, and resilience of the Gaston College community. Mo appears at campus events—including the opening of the Rhino Shop—and is used in college-wide branding and marketing materials with the rallying cry “#FearTheHorn.”
