= Bessemer City Downtown Historic District =

Historic district in North Carolina, United States

- U.S. National Register of Historic Places
- U.S. Historic district
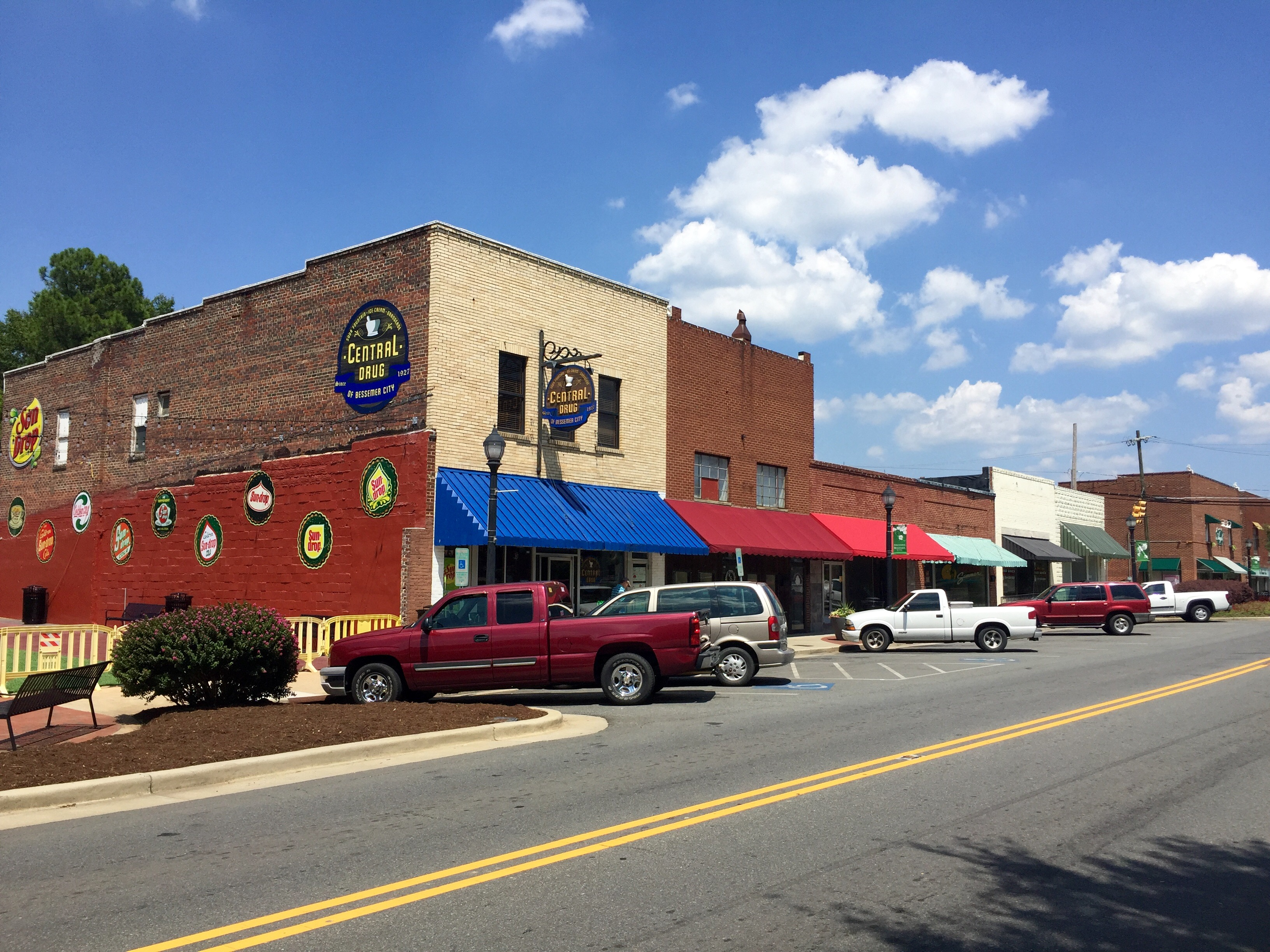
- Central Drug Store, Former Rex Theater & 106-108 W. Virginia Avenue, 2016

- Location within North Carolina Location within the United States
- Location: Roughly bounded by 13th & E. Alabama Sts., E. & W. Virginia, E. Alabama & W. Pennsylvania Aves., Bessemer City, North Carolina
- Coordinates: 35°17′02″N 81°17′03″W
- Area: 23 acres (9.3 ha)
- Built: 1896
- Architectural style: Commercial Style
- NRHP reference No.: 14000228
- Added to NRHP: May 19, 2014

The Bessemer City Downtown Historic District is a national historic district in Bessemer City, Gaston County, North Carolina. It encompasses 23 contributing buildings and 10 contributing structures in Bessemer City's central business district. The buildings were built between after 1896, and include one- and two-story commercial buildings and two large, sprawling textile mill complexes. Notable buildings include:

- Whetstone Cotton Mills-Huss Manufacturing Company-Algodon Manufacturing Division of Pyramid Mills (1903, 1909, c. 1960)
- Southern Cotton Mills-Osage Manufacturing Company (1895, 1896, c. 1905, c. 1935, c. 1960)
- Gamble Hardware (c. 1945)
- Central Drug Store (1927, 1960s)
- Winn-Dixie Grocery (c. 1926)
- Shulman's Department Store (c. 1920; c. 1940; c. 1960)
- Kincaid Service Station and Pontiac Dealership (1932, c. 1937, c. 1960).

It was listed on the National Register of Historic Places in 2014.

== Gallery ==
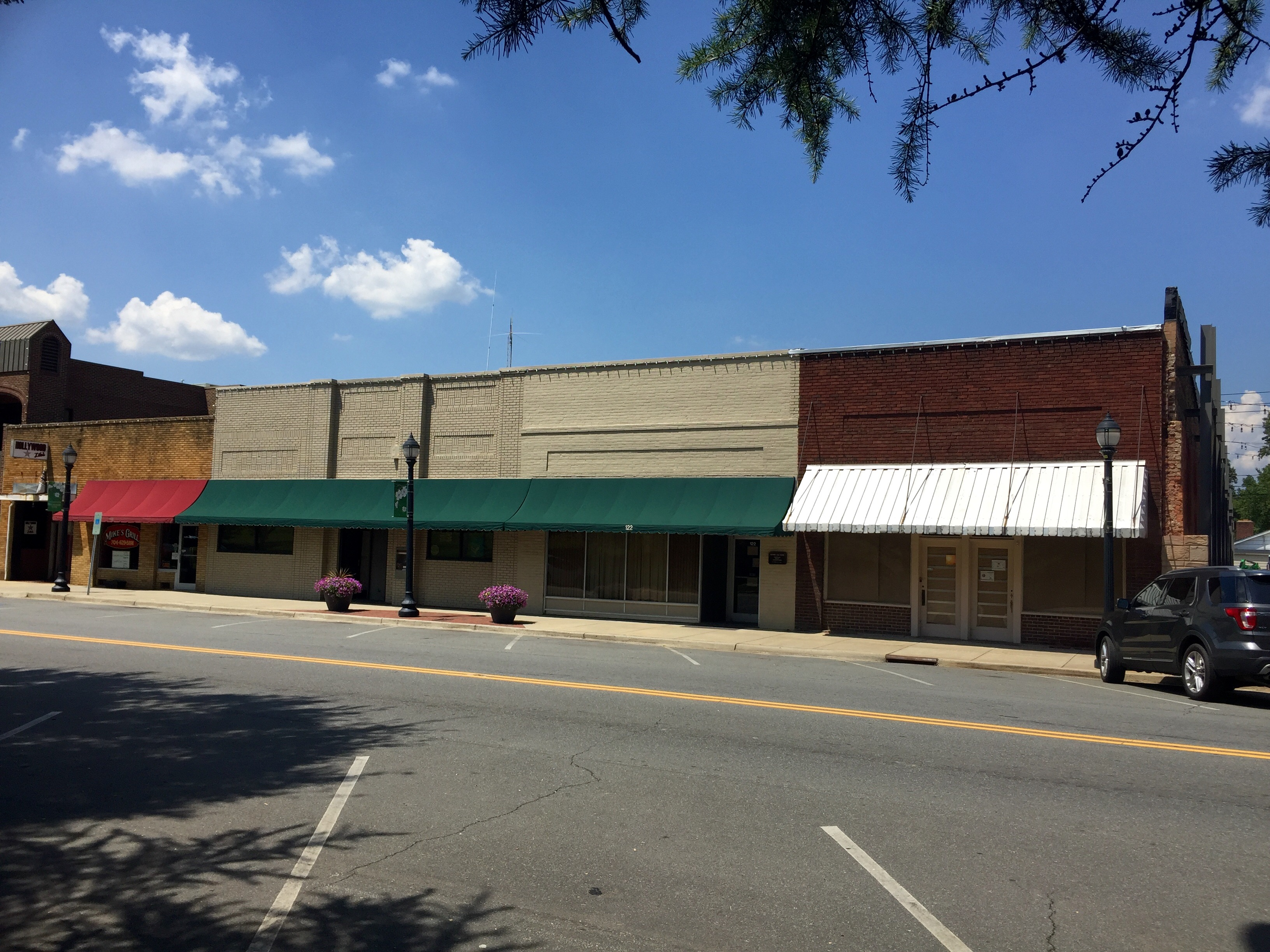
128-130 W. Virginia Ave, First State Bank & Trust Building, Lewis Grocery & Winn-Dixie Grocery, 2016

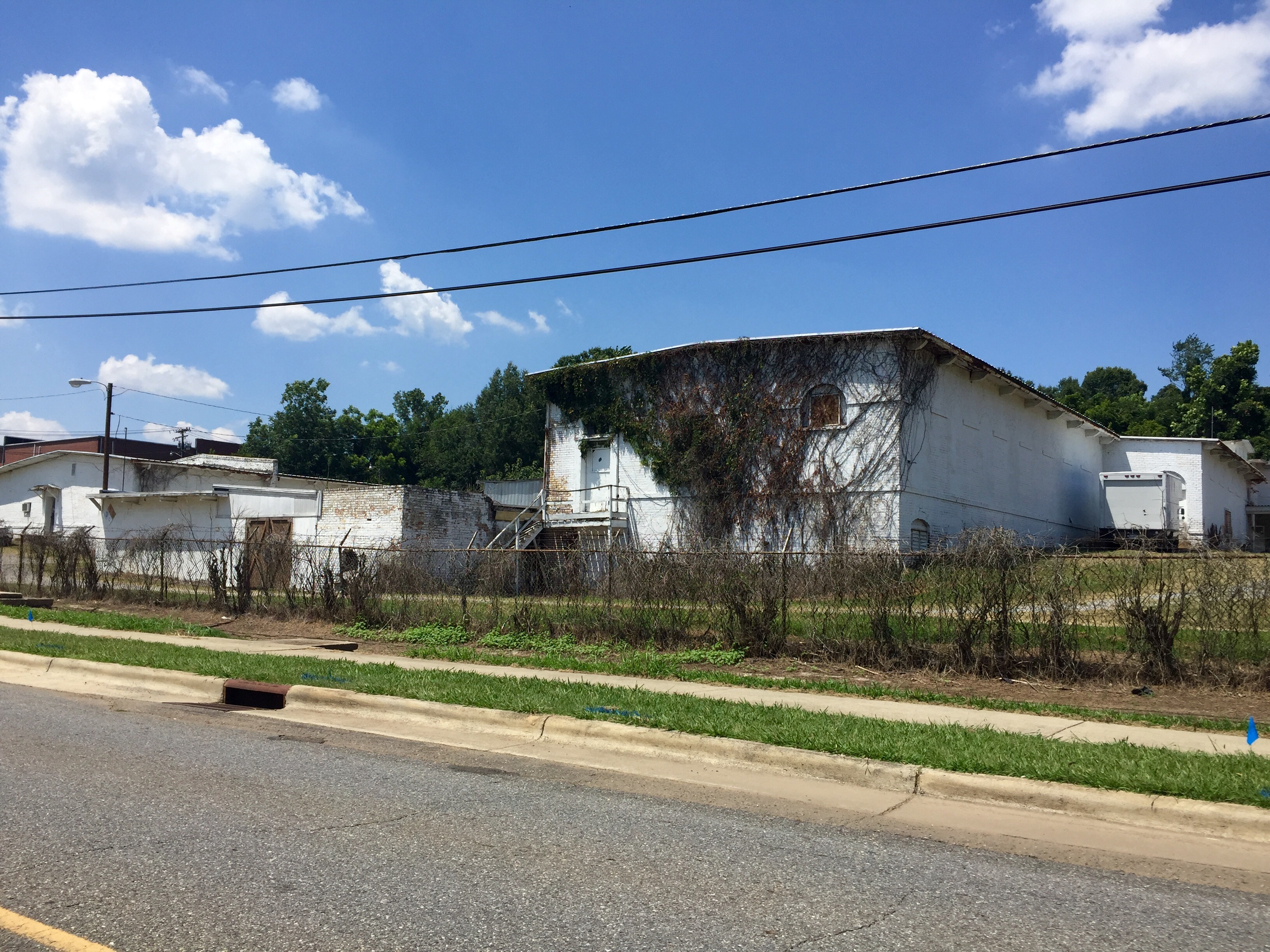
Whetstone Cotton Mills, 2016

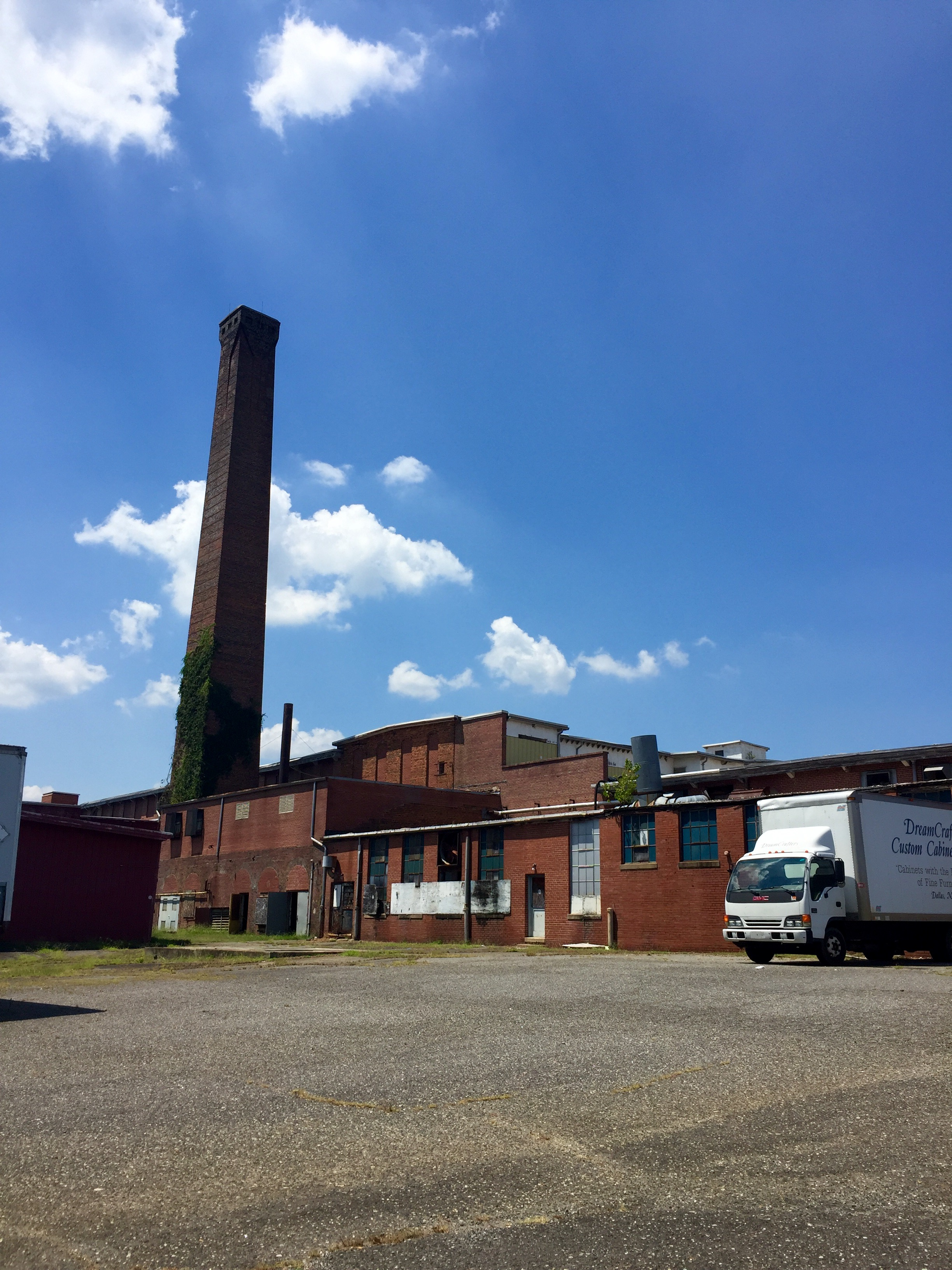
Southern Cotton Mills-Osage Manufacturing Company, 2016

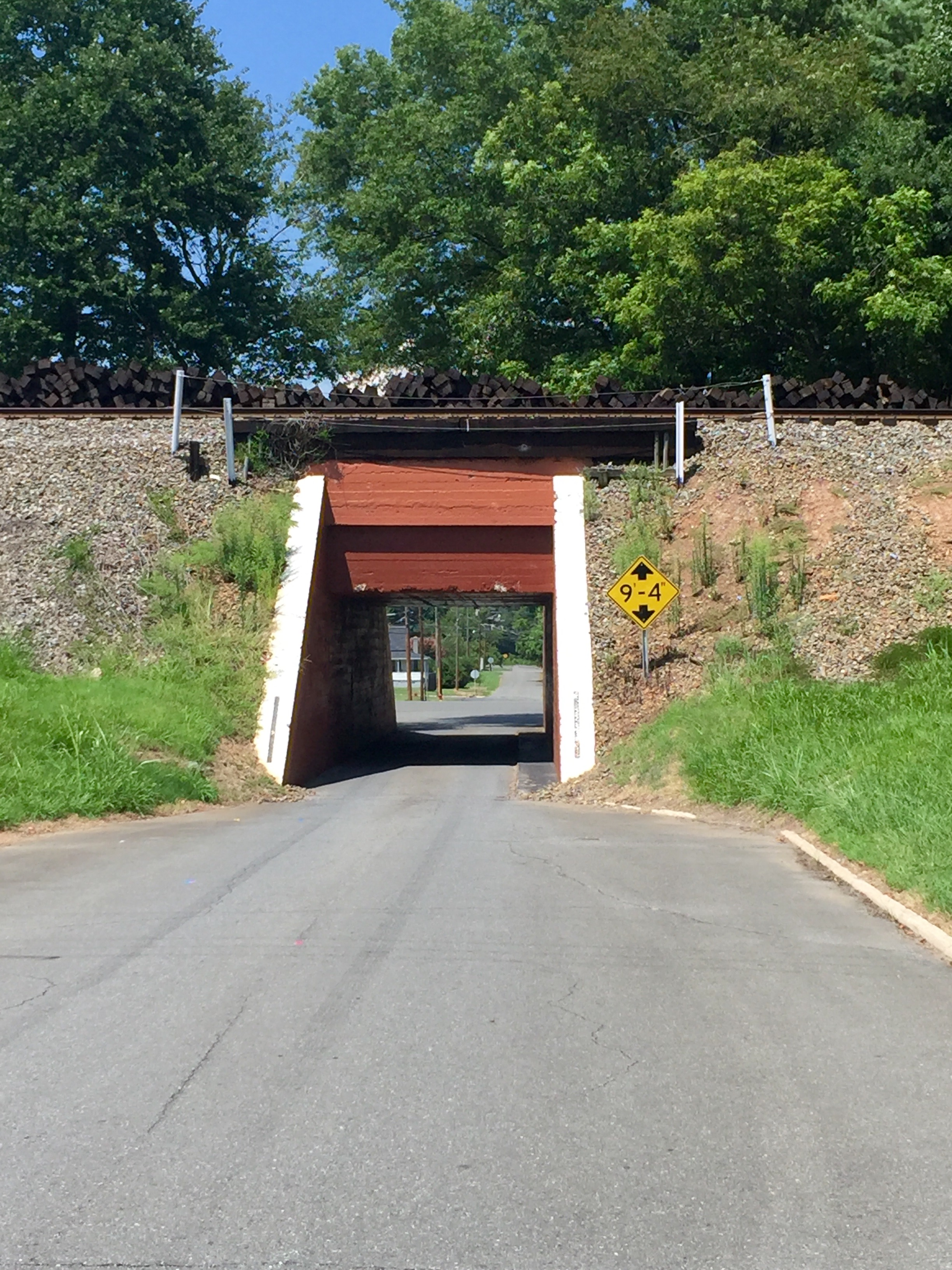
Eleventh Street Railroad Underpass, 2016

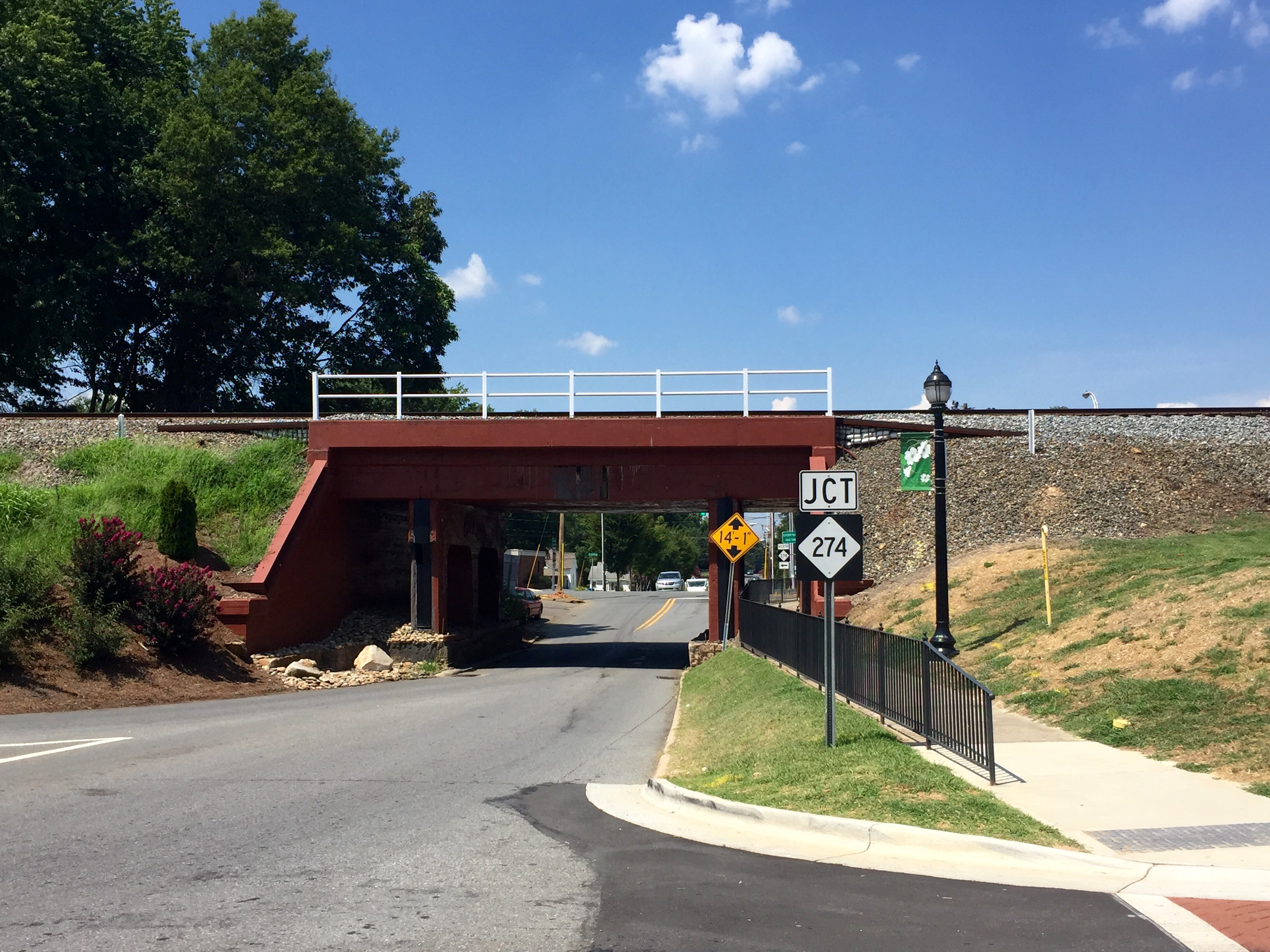
Thirteenth Street Railroad Underpass, 2016
