= Dallas Historic District =

Historic district in North Carolina, United States

- U.S. National Register of Historic Places
- U.S. Historic district
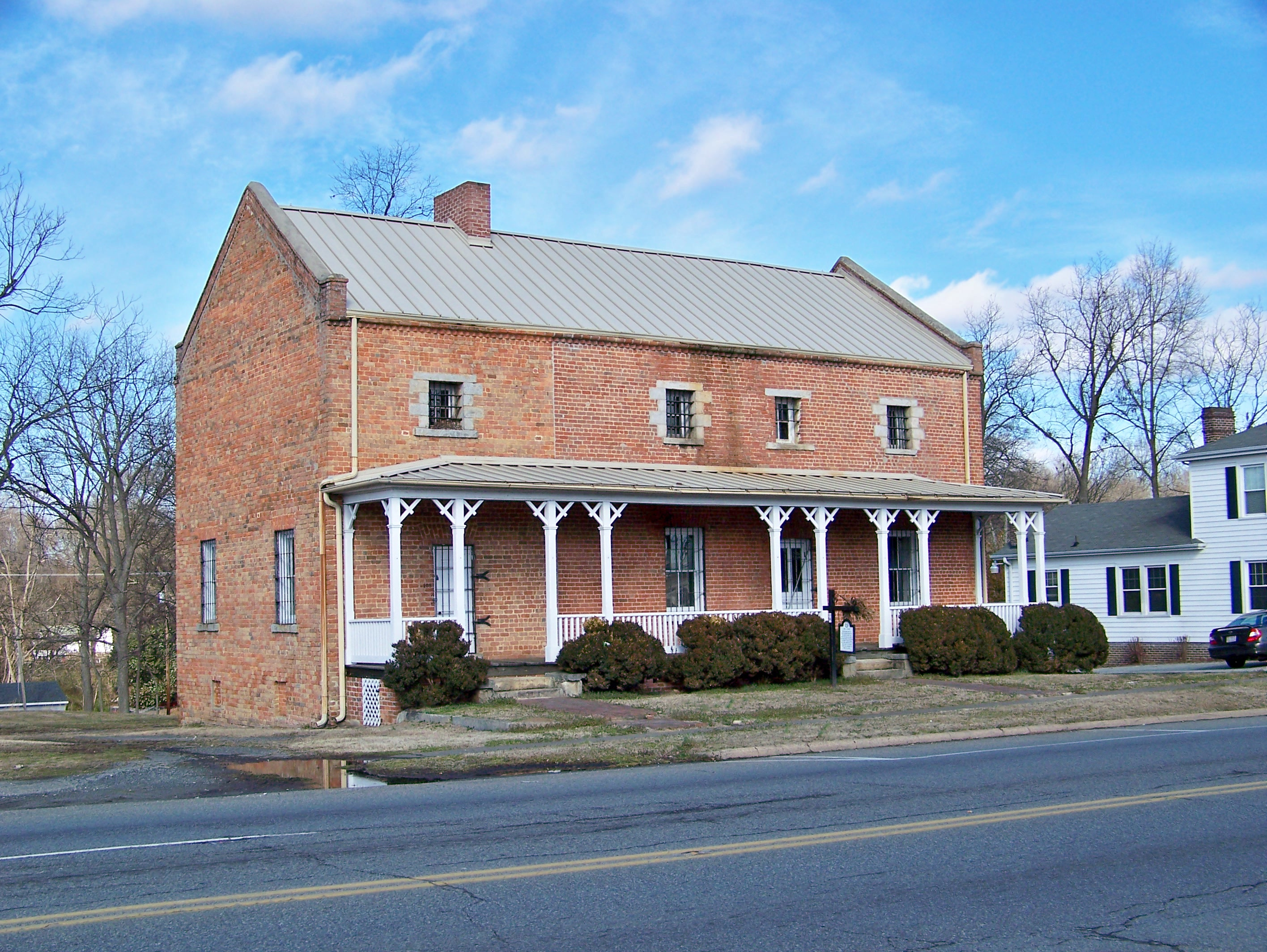
- Gaston County Jail, 2014

- Location within North Carolina Location within the United States
- Location: Bounded by Holland, Main, Gaston and Trade Sts., Dallas, North Carolina
- Coordinates: 35°18′58″N 81°10′35″W
- Area: 3 acres (1.2 ha)
- Built: c. 1847
- Built by: Welch, Mr.
- Architectural style: Late Victorian, Greek Revival
- NRHP reference No.: 73001344 (original); 100007593 (increase)

Significant dates
- Added to NRHP: July 26, 1973
- Boundary increase: April 13, 2022

Dallas Historic District is a national historic district located at Dallas, Gaston County, North Carolina. It encompasses eight contributing buildings surrounding the courthouse square and dated between about 1840 and 1900. Dallas served as the county seat of Gaston County from 1847 to 1911. They are the Greek Revival style old Gaston County Courthouse, which now functions as the Dallas Town Hall; the county jail; the Hoffman Hotel; the Rhyne Store; the Smyre-Pasour House; the Matthews Hotel; the Late Victorian style Wilson-Spargo House; and the Setzer General Store.

The district was listed on the National Register of Historic Places in 1973.

== Gallery ==
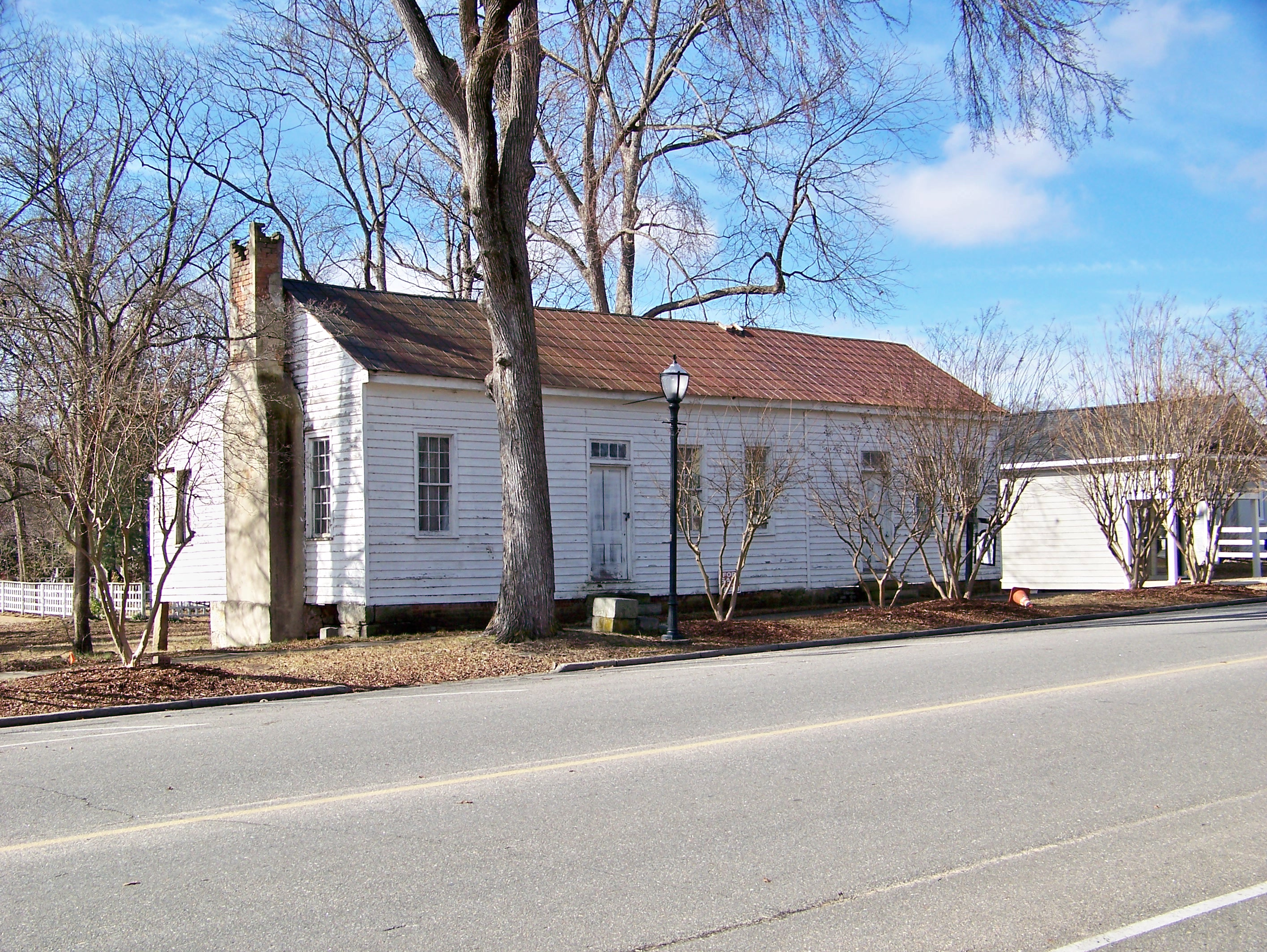
Smyre-Pasour House, 2014

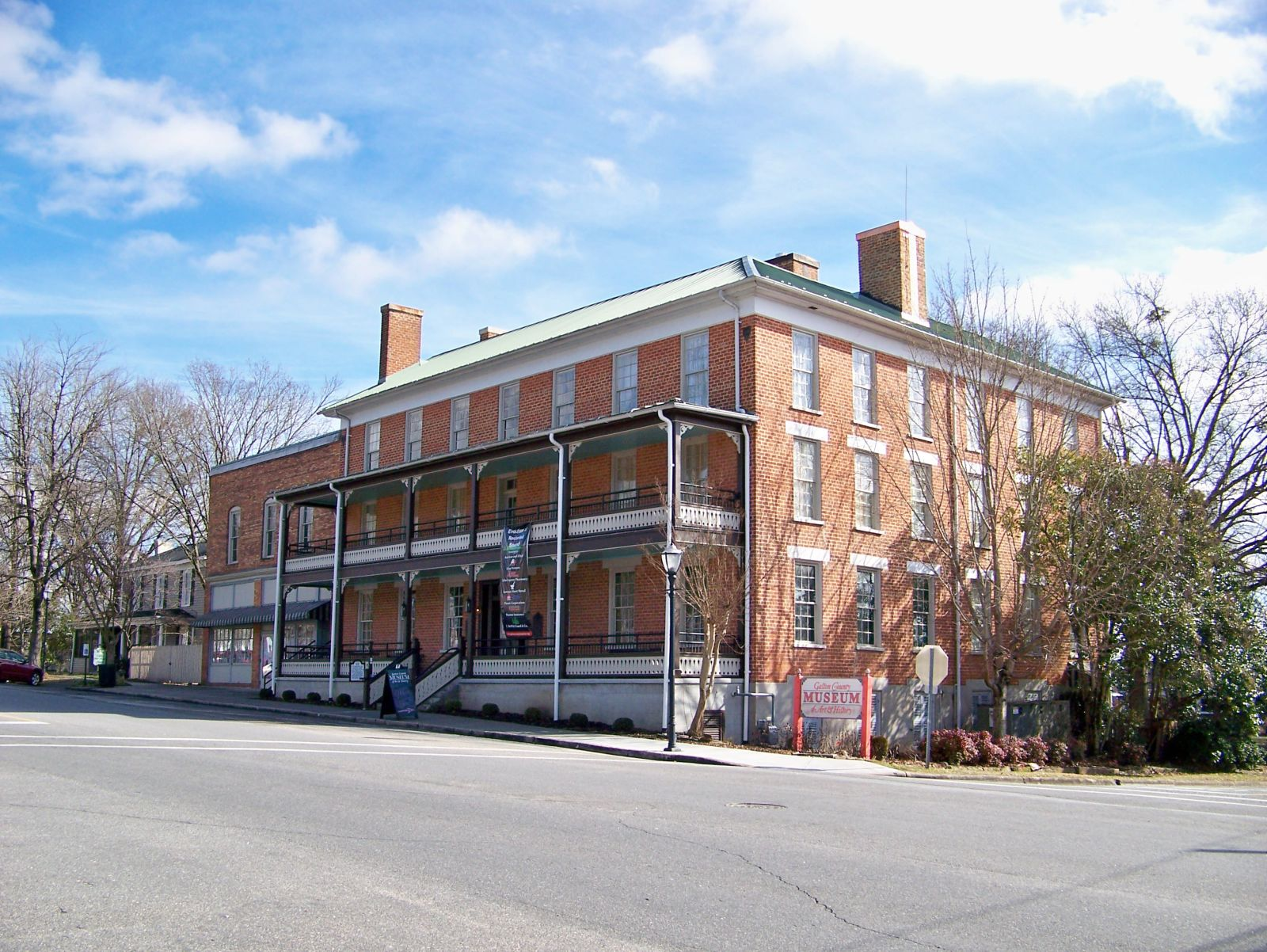
Hoffman Hotel-Gaston County Museum, 2014

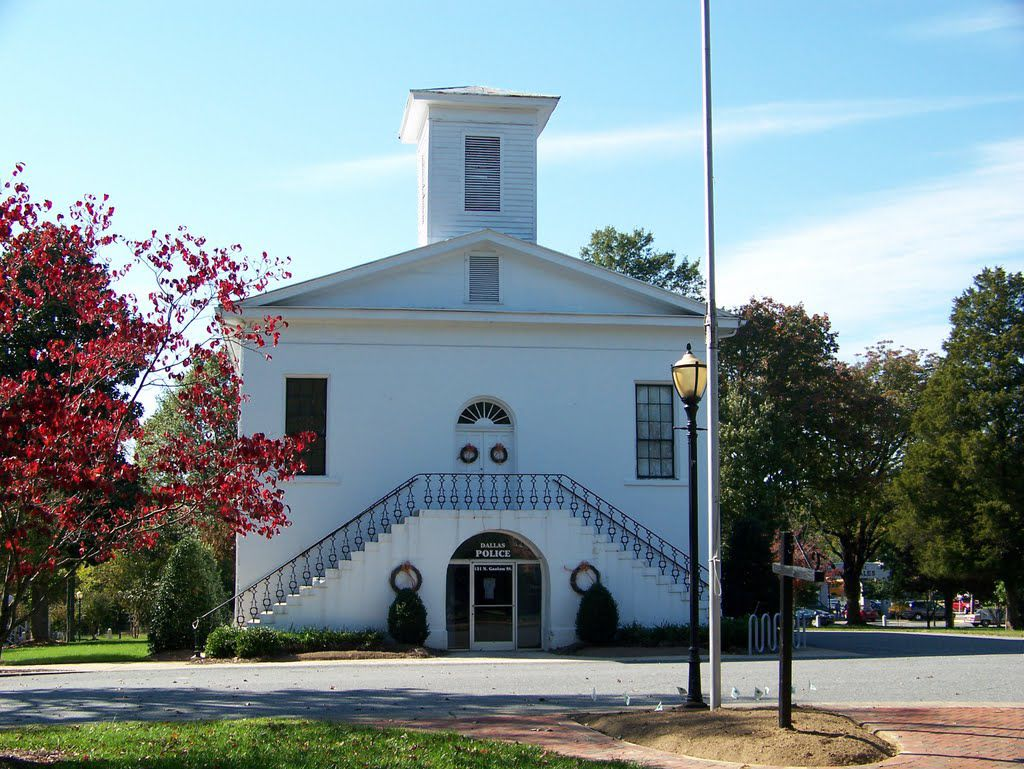
Gaston County's First Courthouse, 2012
