= Eli Hoyle House =

Historic house in North Carolina, United States

- U.S. National Register of Historic Places
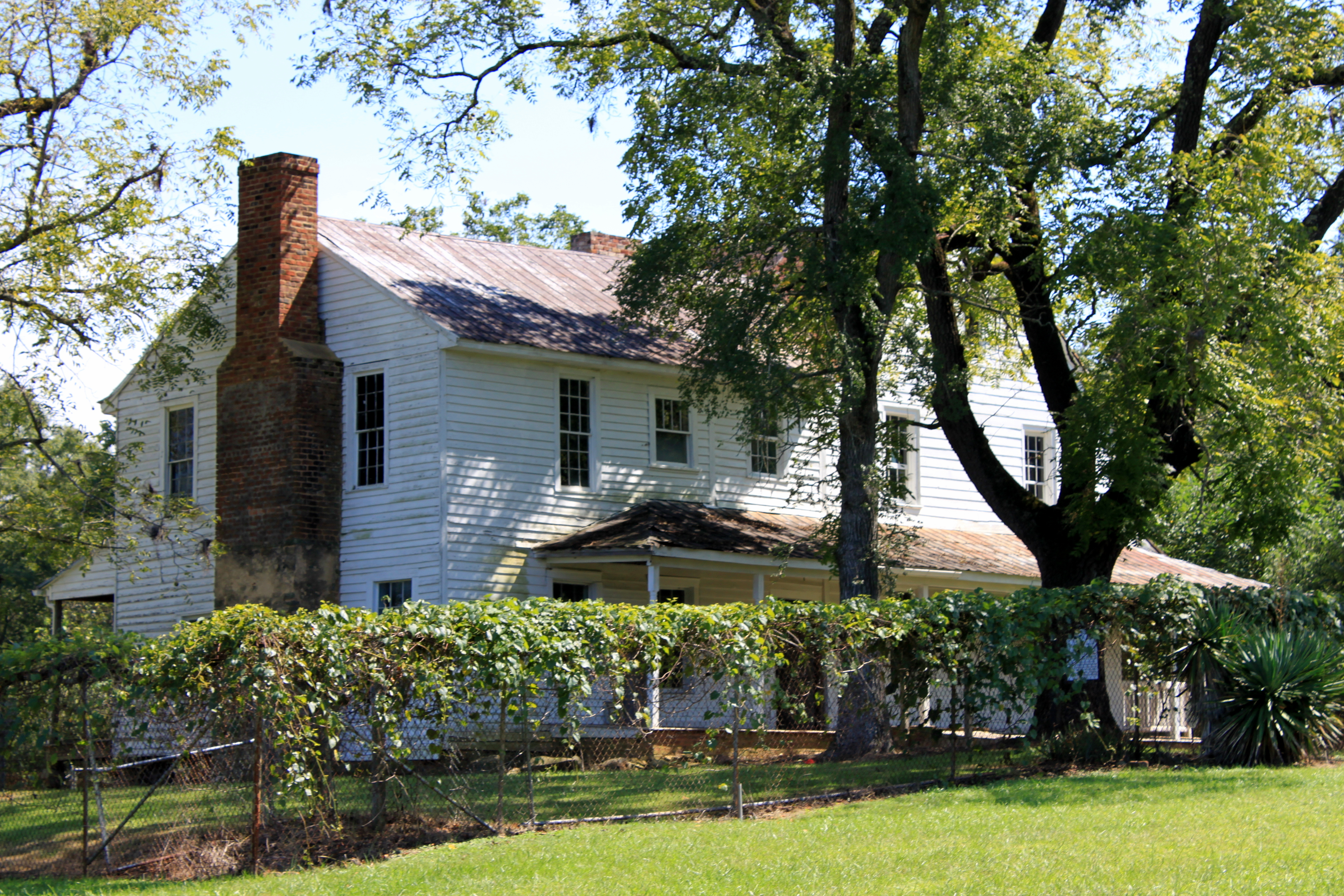
- Eli Hoyle House, September 2014

- Location within North Carolina Location within the United States
- Location: 1111 Dallas-Stanley Hwy, near Dallas, North Carolina
- Coordinates: 35°19′37″N 81°8′28″W
- Area: 2.8 acres (1.1 ha)
- Built: c. 1830-1833
- Architectural style: Federal
- NRHP reference No.: 98001529
- Added to NRHP: December 17, 1998

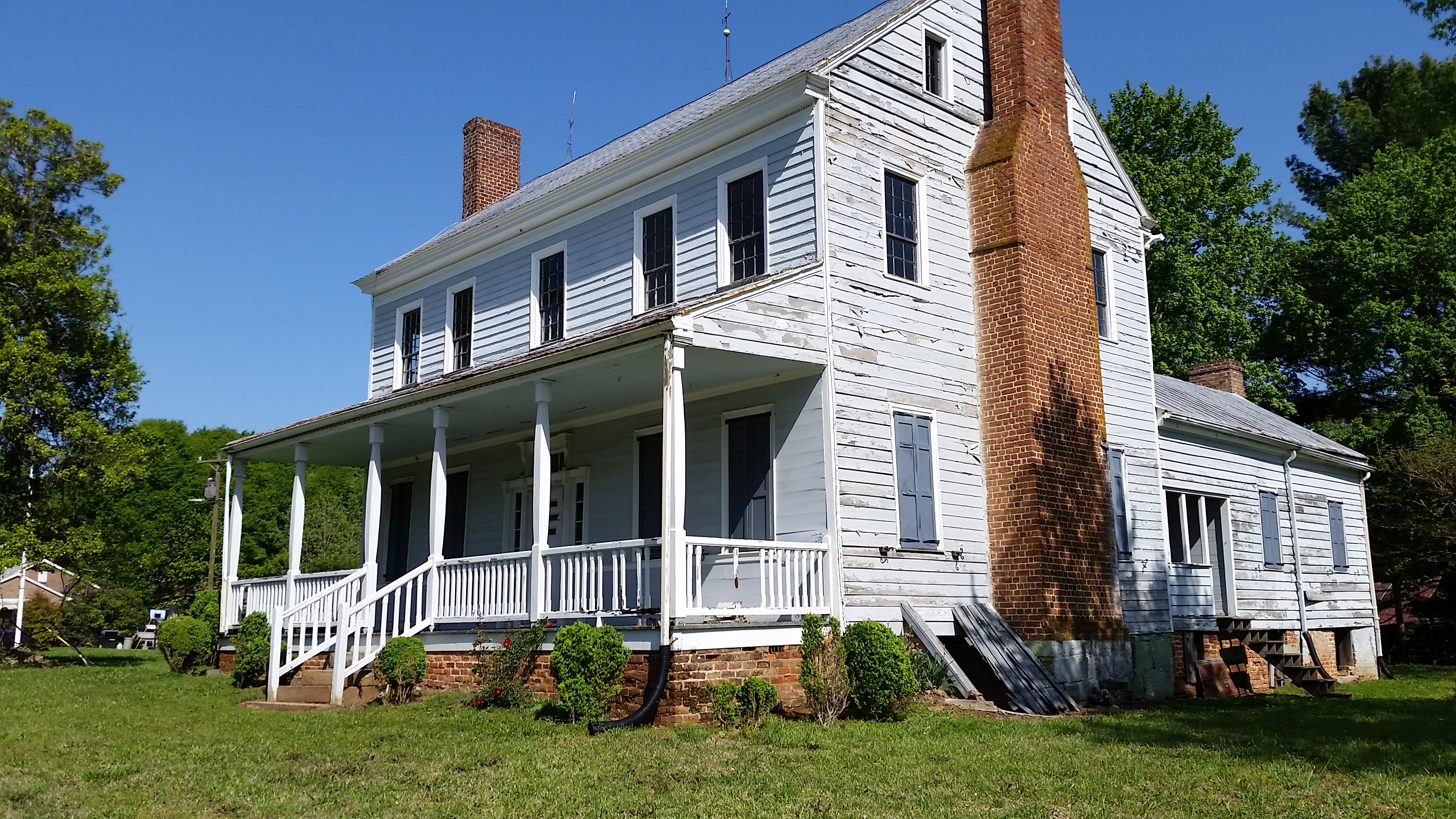
Eli Hoyle Home

Eli Hoyle House is a historic plantation house located near Dallas, Gaston County, North Carolina. It was built about 1830–1833, and is a two-story, five-bay, Federal-style frame dwelling. It has a side-gable roof, exterior brick end chimneys, and sits on a stone foundation. It was built by Eli Hoyle (1801–1844), great-grandson of Pieter Hieyl who built the nearby Hoyle Historic Homestead.

It was listed on the National Register of Historic Places in 1998.
