= Dallas Graded and High School =

Historic school building in North Carolina, United States

- U.S. National Register of Historic Places
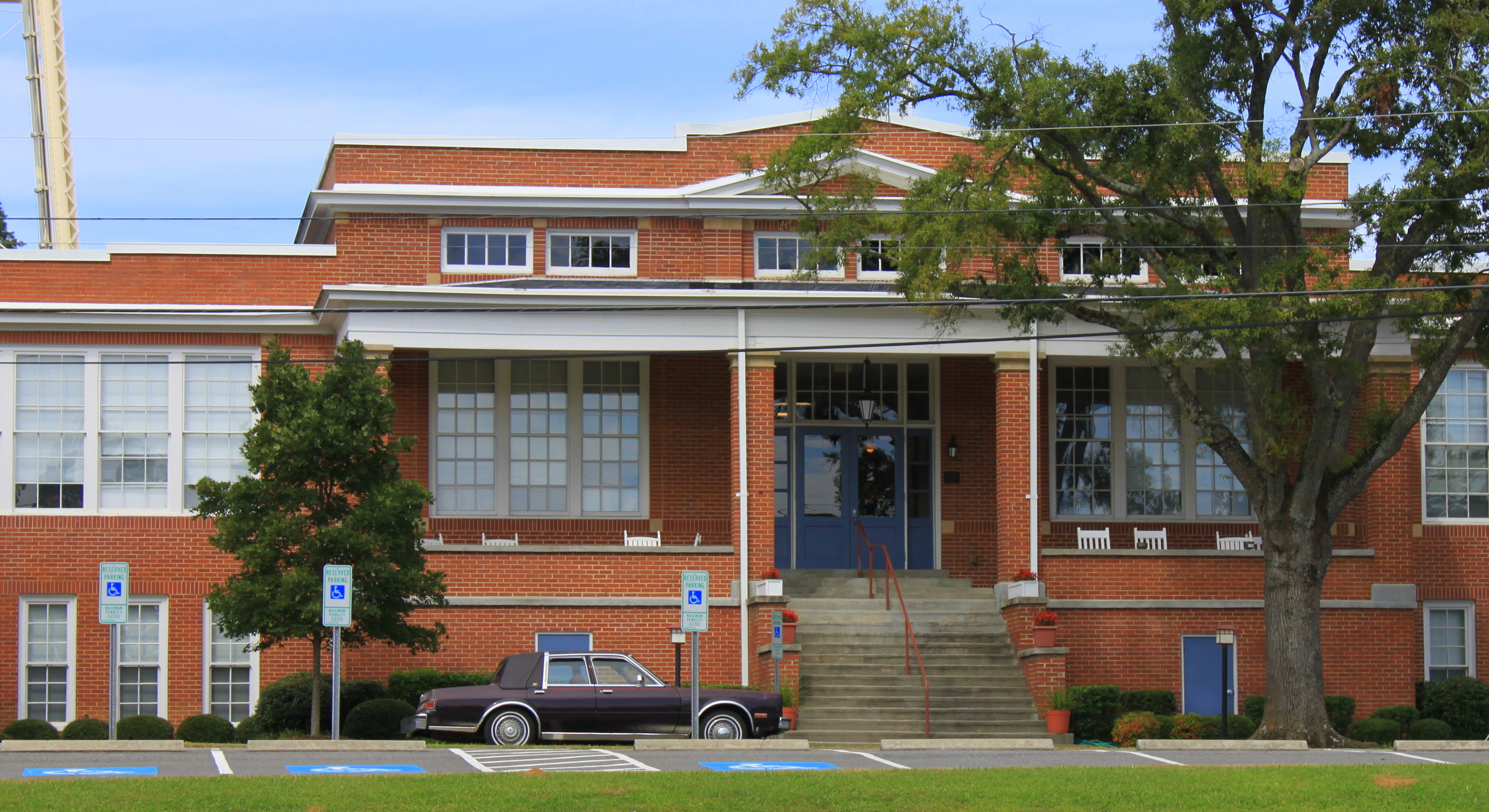
- Dallas Graded and High School, September 2014

- Location within North Carolina Location within the United States
- Location: 300 W. Church St., Dallas, North Carolina
- Coordinates: 35°18′52″N 81°10′46″W
- Area: less than one acre
- Built: 1923-1924, 1939
- Architect: McMichael
- Architectural style: Classical Revival
- NRHP reference No.: 02000441
- Added to NRHP: May 2, 2002

Dallas Graded and High School, also known as the Church Street School, is a historic school building located at Dallas, Gaston County, North Carolina. The main school building was built in 1923–1924, and is a two-story, seven-bay, T-plan Classical Revival style red brick school. It has a flat roof with parapet and features a three-bay porticoed entry pavilion. It has an eight classroom addition built in 1951.

It was listed on the National Register of Historic Places in 2002.
