= Central School (Bessemer City, North Carolina) =

Historic school building in North Carolina, United States

- U.S. National Register of Historic Places
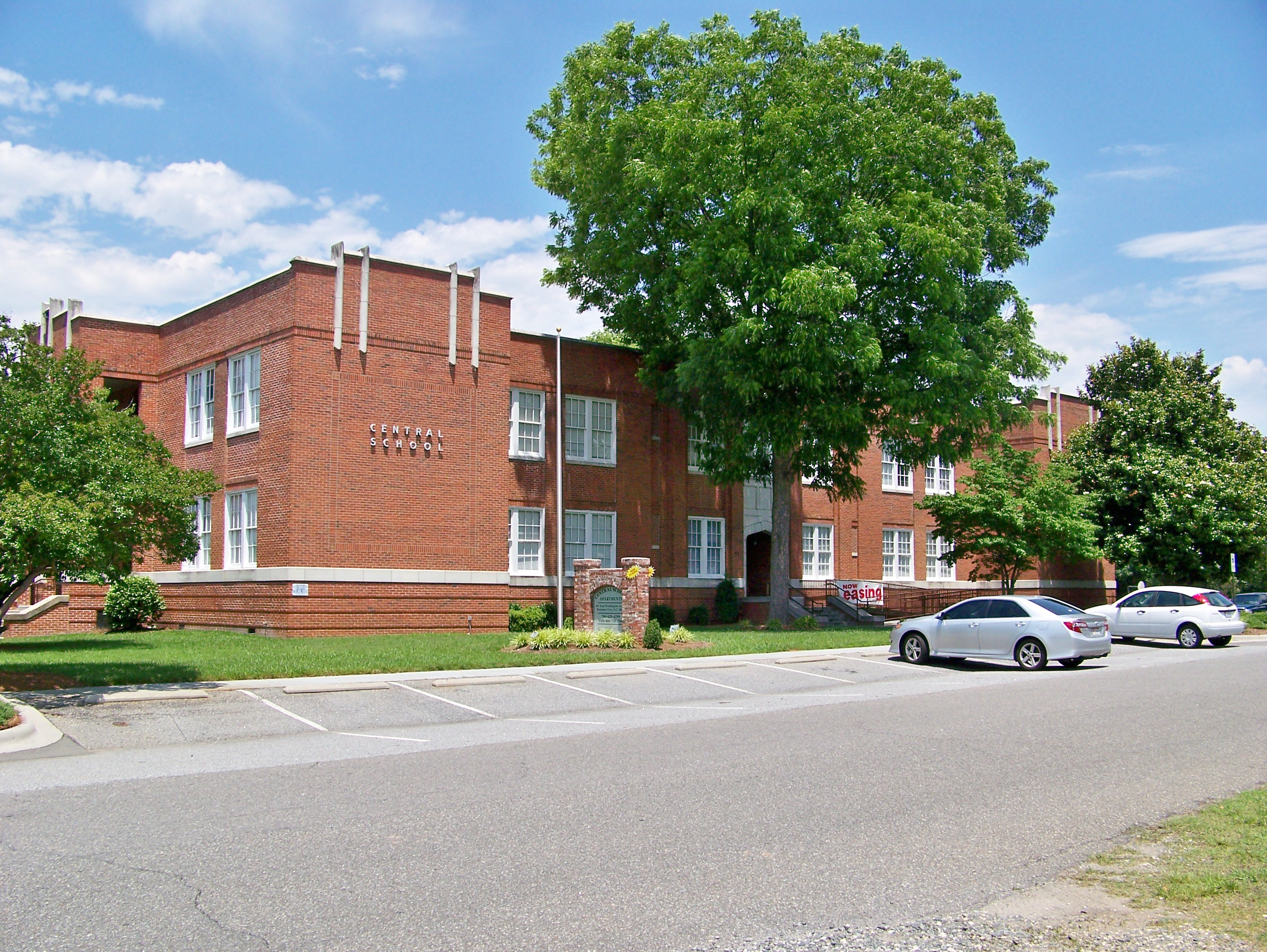

- Location within North Carolina Location within the United States
- Location: 317 Washington Ave., Bessemer City, North Carolina
- Coordinates: 35°17′5″N 81°16′36″W
- Area: 3 acres (1.2 ha)
- Built: c. 1929, 1933, 1938-1939, 1953
- Architectural style: Late 19th And 20th Century Revivals, Rustic Revival
- NRHP reference No.: 07001374
- Added to NRHP: January 9, 2008

Central School, also known as Bessemer City Elementary School, is a historic school complex located at Bessemer City, Gaston County, North Carolina. The main school building was built about 1929, and is a two-story, "U"-plan brick building with Collegiate Gothic detailing. It was rebuilt following a fire in 1942. Adjacent to the school is the Rustic Revival style, rough cut stone gymnasium built in 1933 with funds provided by the Works Progress Administration. Other contributing buildings are the Home Economics Building (c. 1938-1939), Classroom Building (c. 1953), and Storage Shed (c. 1953).

It was listed on the National Register of Historic Places in 2008.
