= Lucia, North Carolina =

Unincorporated community in North Carolina, United States

- Unincorporated community
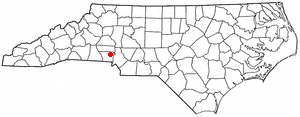
- Location in the U.S. state of North Carolina
- Coordinates: 35°23′5″N 81°0′38″W
- Country: United States
- State: North Carolina
- County: Gaston
- Elevation: 840 ft (256 m)
- Time zone: UTC-5 (Eastern (EST))
  - Summer (DST): UTC-4 (EDT)
- ZIP code: 28120 (Mt. Holly) or 28164 (Stanley)
- Area code: 704
- FIPS code: 37-39620
- GNIS feature ID: 989116

Lucia is an unincorporated community in Gaston County, North Carolina, United States, approximately 6.5 miles (10.5 km) east of the town of Stanley.

The Andrew Carpenter House, near Lucia, was listed on the National Register of Historic Places in 1983.
