= Dallas, North Carolina =

- Town
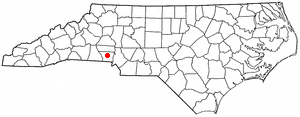
- Location of Dallas, North Carolina
- Coordinates: 35°19′02″N 81°11′00″W
- Country: United States
- State: North Carolina
- County: Gaston
- Founded: 1846
- Incorporated: 1863
- Named after: George M. Dallas

Government
  - Mayor: Hayley Beaty

Area
  - Total: 3.06 sq mi (7.93 km^{2})
  - Land: 3.06 sq mi (7.93 km^{2})
  - Water: 0 sq mi (0.00 km^{2})
- Elevation: 787 ft (240 m)

Population (2020)
  - Total: 5,927
  - Density: 1,935.7/sq mi (747.39/km^{2})
- Time zone: UTC-5 (Eastern (EST))
  - Summer (DST): UTC-4 (EDT)
- ZIP code: 28034
- Area codes: 704, 980
- FIPS code: 37-16180
- GNIS feature ID: 2406350
- Website: www.dallasnc.net

Dallas is a town in Gaston County, North Carolina, United States, and a suburb of Charlotte, located north of Gastonia. As of the 2020 census, Dallas had a population of 5,927. It was named for George M. Dallas, Vice President of the United States under James K. Polk.

== Geography ==
Dallas is located approximately four miles north of the city of Gastonia and about 24 miles (39 km) west of Charlotte. Lincolnton is 13 miles (21 km) north and Hickory is 34 miles (55 km) north of Dallas along US 321.

According to the United States Census Bureau, the town has a total area of 2.9 square miles (7.5 km^{2}), all of it land.

Dallas lies within the Long Creek watershed. Long Creek is a right tributary of the South Fork Catawba River. Dallas is drained by Long Creek tributaries Dallas Branch and Little Long Creek.

== History ==
Dallas was officially incorporated in 1863 and is the oldest incorporated town in Gaston County. It served as the original county seat for Gaston County from 1846 until 1911. The old Gaston County courthouse, renovated in 1868 after a fire, still stands in the main square of the town and formerly served as the headquarters of the Dallas Police Department. The town government has renovated the courthouse.

Dallas began to decline in importance when the town commissioners refused to appropriate money for construction of bridges over several creeks for the Atlanta and Richmond Air-Line Railway in the 1872. The commissioners said the reason was because residents thought that trains would wake them during the night and frighten their livestock. In 1890, White Caps attacked the town "'Kuklux' style", destroying entire portions of the town. After this, the county seat was relocated to Gastonia in 1911.

The Dallas Graded and High School, Dallas Historic District, Hoyle House, and Eli Hoyle House are listed on the National Register of Historic Places.

== Demographics ==
Historical population
| Census | Pop. | Note | %± |
|---|---|---|---|
| 1870 | 299 | | — |
| 1880 | 417 | | 39.5% |
| 1890 | 441 | | 5.8% |
| 1900 | 514 | | 16.6% |
| 1910 | 1,065 | | 107.2% |
| 1920 | 1,397 | | 31.2% |
| 1930 | 1,489 | | 6.6% |
| 1940 | 1,704 | | 14.4% |
| 1950 | 2,454 | | 44.0% |
| 1960 | 3,270 | | 33.3% |
| 1970 | 4,059 | | 24.1% |
| 1980 | 3,340 | | −17.7% |
| 1990 | 3,012 | | −9.8% |
| 2000 | 3,402 | | 12.9% |
| 2010 | 4,488 | | 31.9% |
| 2020 | 5,927 | | 32.1% |
| 2025 (est.) | 6,392 | ▲ | 7.8% |
U.S. Decennial Census

=== 2020 census ===
Dallas racial composition
| Race | Number | Percentage |
|---|---|---|
| White (non-Hispanic) | 3,475 | 58.63% |
| Black or African American (non-Hispanic) | 1,277 | 21.55% |
| Native American | 24 | 0.4% |
| Asian | 51 | 0.86% |
| Pacific Islander | 3 | 0.05% |
| Other/Mixed | 297 | 5.01% |
| Hispanic or Latino | 800 | 13.5% |

As of the 2020 census, Dallas had a population of 5,927. The median age was 35.2 years. 26.8% of residents were under the age of 18 and 12.7% of residents were 65 years of age or older. For every 100 females there were 87.0 males, and for every 100 females age 18 and over there were 83.8 males age 18 and over.

99.7% of residents lived in urban areas, while 0.3% lived in rural areas.

There were 2,328 households in Dallas, of which 38.7% had children under the age of 18 living in them. Of all households, 38.3% were married-couple households, 19.0% were households with a male householder and no spouse or partner present, and 36.0% were households with a female householder and no spouse or partner present. About 28.6% of all households were made up of individuals and 10.5% had someone living alone who was 65 years of age or older.

There were 2,522 housing units, of which 7.7% were vacant. The homeowner vacancy rate was 1.9% and the rental vacancy rate was 6.9%.

=== 2010 census ===
As of the census of 2010, there were 4,488 people, 1,792 households, and 1,195 families residing in the town. The population density was 1,543 inhabitants per square mile (596/km^{2}). There were 2,003 housing units at an average density of 690.7 per square mile (266.7/km^{2}). The racial makeup of the town was 76.4% White, 15.9% African American, 0.4% Native American, 0.6% Asian, 4.9% some other race, and 1.8% from two or more races. Hispanic or Latino of any race were 8.0% of the population.

There were 1,792 households, out of which 37.3% had children under the age of 18 living with them, 40.7% were married couples living together, 19.9% had a female householder with no husband present, and 33.3% were non-families. 28.2% of all households were made up of individuals, and 10.2% had someone living alone who was 65 years of age or older. The average household size was 2.5 and the average family size was 3.04.

In the town, the population was spread out, with 26.0% under the age of 18, 9.6% from 18 to 24, 30.2% from 25 to 44, 22.2% from 45 to 64, and 12.1% who were 65 years of age or older. The median age was 34.9 years. The male population was 47.7% and the female population was 52.3%.

=== Income and poverty ===
For the period 2007–11, the estimated median annual income for a household in the town was $35,625, and the median income for a family was $48,239. Male full-time workers had a median income of $32,203 versus $27,154 for females. The per capita income for the town was $18,570. About 11.1% of families and 14.6% of the population were below the poverty line, including 18.8% of those under age 18 and 6.5% of those age 65 or over.

== Education ==
Dallas is the site of the main campus of Gaston College, a community college offering associate degree, Certificate, and Diploma programs. It is located on U.S. Highway 321 west of the city's business district.

Dallas is home to Costner Elementary, Carr Elementary, W.C. Friday Middle School, and North Gaston High School. There is a private Christian school, Community Christian Academy.

The Dallas Branch of the Gaston County Public Library serves this community.

== Places of interest ==
- The Hoyle Historic Homestead is an example of German-American architecture from the mid-late 18th century and is listed on the National Register of Historic Places.
- The Dallas Historic District, bounded by Holland, Main, Gaston and Trade streets, is also listed on the National Register of Historic Places. The district consists of eight buildings, including the former Gaston County Courthouse (built in 1848), former Gaston County Jail (1848), the Smyre-Pasour House (1850), Rhyne Store (1850), and the Hoffman Hotel (1852). The Hoffman Hotel is now home to the Gaston County Museum.
- Biggerstaff Park in Dallas is the venue of the "Shelby Hamfest", a gathering of amateur radio operators. This is one of the oldest and largest such festivals in the country.

== Media ==
=== Television ===
Dallas is in the Charlotte-Gastonia viewing area. This is the list of the Television stations available in Dallas:

=== Radio ===
This is the list of the radio stations available in Dallas:

== Notable people ==
- Jake Buchanan, former MLB pitcher
- Alfred L. Bulwinkle, 14-term Democratic member of the United States House of Representatives
- Pearl Burris-Floyd, member of the North Carolina House of Representatives
- Caleb Costner, professional stock car racing driver
- William C. Friday, president of the University of North Carolina system from 1956 to 1986
- David W. Hoyle, former mayor of Dallas and nine-term Democratic member of the North Carolina State Senate
- Duane Ross, track and field coach, and former athlete, specializing in the 110 meters hurdles. Won bronze medal at 1999 World Championships and represented the United States at 2004 Summer Olympics.
