= Hoyle Historic Homestead =

Historic house in North Carolina, United States

- Hoyle House
- U.S. National Register of Historic Places
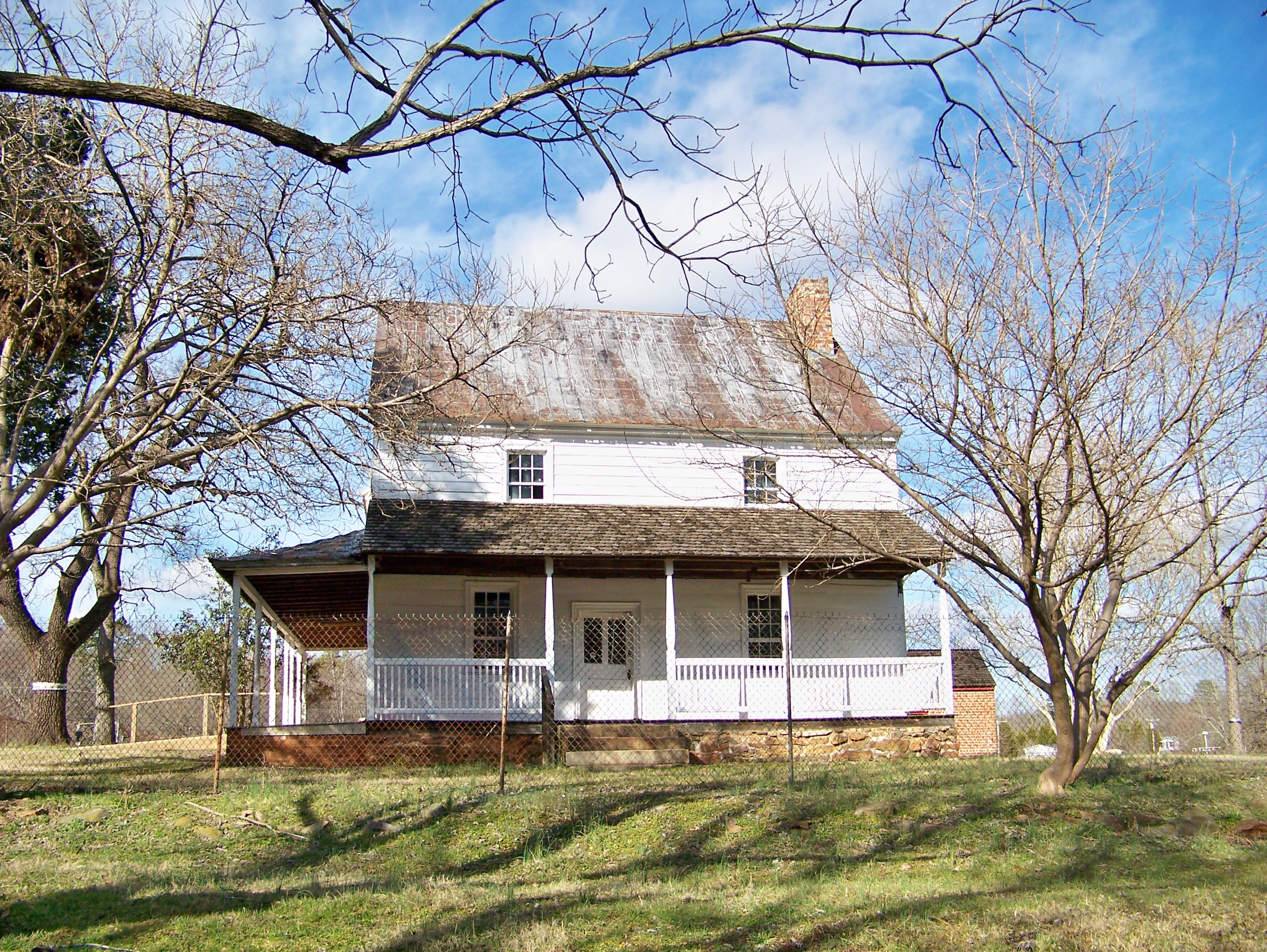

- Location within North Carolina Location within the United States
- Location: South side of NC 275, 1,400 feet (430 m) southwest of the south fork of the Catawba River
- Nearest city: Dallas, North Carolina
- Coordinates: 35°19′36″N 81°08′16″W
- Area: 8.95 acres (3.62 ha)
- Built: 1794
- Architectural style: Federal, Georgian
- NRHP reference No.: 93001140
- Added to NRHP: October 21, 1993

The Hoyle Historic Homestead, also known as Hoyle Family Homestead, Peter Hoyle House, and Pieter Hieyl Homeplace, is a mid- to late-18th century two-story house in Gaston County, North Carolina, with notable German-American construction features, the main block of which reflects two, and possibly three, phases, but the exact construction dates have not been determined. A major renovation, c. 1810, added a late Georgian and Federal finish, as well as front and rear shed porches. A brick well house and a frame smokehouse, both east of the house, date from the 19th century. Almost nine acres (36,000 m^{2}), with several large walnut trees, surround the buildings.

== Hoyle family ==
Pieter Heyl, a miller from Adenbach, Germany, his wife, Catharine, and their children arrived in America on September 11, 1738, on the Robert and Alice, originally settling in northeast Lancaster County, Pennsylvania. The Heyl family, later Anglicized to Hoyle, then lived for some time in Frederick, Maryland, but by 1753 had moved to what is now Gaston County, North Carolina, then part of Anson County. Peter Hoyle died prior to January 20, 1761.

The exact date of construction of the house is not known, but various sources date it anywhere from 1750 to 1758. After Peter's and his eldest son Jacob's deaths, which occurred within a year of each other, the land was inherited by Jacob's minor son Martin, who then transferred his interest to his uncle John. In 1794 the property went to Peter Hoyle's other grandson, Andrew, who became a farmer and entrepreneur. "Rich Andrew", as he was known, may have acquired the property with the house already standing and then improved the dwelling, or he may have built the house and later upgraded it with new finishes in the early years of the 19th century.

== Location ==
The Hoyle House stands on a hill overlooking the South Fork of the Catawba River. The house faces south toward a now overgrown dirt road; the Dallas-Stanley Highway on the north side now provides access to the property.

== Structure ==
The earliest section has a foundation of small stones, still partly visible. The house's German-American hallmarks include its heavy timber frame construction with vertical braces at the corners with tightly fitted horizontal log infillings. The apparently original and complete roof structure is now covered with early 20th century tin, and much of the unusual original beaded siding, applied circa 1810 with cut nails, survives covered by weatherboard. Weathering beneath the beaded siding reveals the exterior was originally unsheathed. Some of the early windows remain, set in molded surrounds with molded sills that appear to date to 1810. The windows originally were small (about two and a half feet square) and possibly filled only with shutters in the earliest period.

The first floor of the main block is a four-room plan of two larger rooms on the east side, with corner fireplaces sharing a single chimney, and two smaller west rooms. Each pair of rooms is of equal width, but the front rooms are slightly deeper. A later, second north–south partition, no longer in place, once created a center-hall plan. Today all rooms connect with adjacent rooms. The original staircase, in the southeast corner of the larger front room, enclosed with one set of winders and at least one stop outside the enclosure, was removed in the late 1960s.

The first floor interior is carefully finished. Much of the modern sheetrock and painting have been removed to reveal early board ceilings and walnut paneled partitions and paneling on the outer walls. While some or all of the interior sheathing appears to date after 1810, all of the trim and some of the ceiling probably date to the first remodeling.

The three room plan of the second floor consists of a large east room that comprises about two thirds of the space along with two small west rooms. The north–south paneled partition is similar to the partition of the first floor. This basic three room plan probably is original, although the partition has been moved at least twice. Notches on the baseboard and patching of the wall plasters and chair rail indicate the wall was moved east, into the larger space, by about three feet. All outer walls were exposed logs until they were plastered, probably early in the 19th century. A door in the northeast corner of the large east room leads to an enclosed attic staircase; in the stairwell the structural system is clearly evident because the corner post, down braces and log filling have never been sheathed.

The two remaining outbuildings date from the early- to mid-19th century. Near the northeast corner of the main house, the well house is a one-story, rectangular common bond brick building with ventilation holes on the ends. A gabled tin roof extends beyond the west end and acts as a porch sheltering the well. The well house stands at the southeast corner, and east of the well house stands a weatherboarded smokehouse with a gabled roof sheathed in sheet metal.

== Importance ==
The Hoyle House is a unique landmark of traditional German-American architecture in North Carolina. The large dwelling exemplifies a construction method— heavy timber frame with log infill— seen elsewhere in the mid-Atlantic Germanic settlement areas but not previously identified in North Carolina.

The date of construction, and thus the identity of the first owner of the house, cannot be conclusively determined from existing documentation, nor can the exact chronology of its development. It is not clear if the house was built by 1761. With further investigation, if the Hoyle House can be firmly dated through archaeology, dendrochronology, or additional documentation, its place in the development of German-American architecture in the Piedmont can be more clearly understood.

== See also ==
- National Register of Historic Places listings in Gaston County, North Carolina
