= East Gaston High School =

American public school in North Carolina

Location
- 1744 Lane Road; Mount Holly, North Carolina 28120; United States; 35°18′54″N 81°04′32″W

Information
- Established: 1972 (54 years ago)
- School district: Gaston County Schools
- Category: Public
- CEEB code: 342790
- Principal: Rebecca Huffstetler
- Staff: 49.36 (FTE)
- Enrollment: 917 (2024–2025)
- Student to teacher ratio: 18.58
- Colors: Cardinal and Navy
- Song: East Gaston Alma Mater
- Athletics: Baseball, Basketball, Cheerleading, Chorus, Cross Country, Dance, Swimming, Football, Golf, Marching Band, Softball, Soccer, Tennis, Track and Field, Volleyball, and Wrestling
- Team name: Warriors
- Rivals: South Point High School, Stuart W. Cramer High School
- Website: eastgaston.gaston.k12.nc.us

East Gaston High School (also referred to as East Gaston or EGHS) is a public high school that is part of the Gaston County Schools district and is located in Mount Holly, North Carolina.

== History ==
The school was established in 1972, when high schools in the neighboring communities of Mount Holly and Stanley were consolidated. Feeder middle schools are Stanley and Mt. Holly, with the surrounding Springfield Elementary School also being within the area.

East Gaston's attendance range covers northeastern Gaston County and includes western portions of Mount Holly, the town of Stanley and the communities of Mountain Island, Alexis, Lucia, Dallas, as well as the surrounding rural areas in Gaston County.

At one point, East Gaston was the largest high school in Gaston County. However, it lost a significant portion of its attendance zone when Stuart W. Cramer High School opened in 2013, in nearby Cramerton.

== Athletics ==
East Gaston's team name are the Warriors, with their school colors being cardinal and navy. Sports offered at East Gaston include:

- Baseball
- Basketball
- Competition Cheerleading
- Cross Country
- Swimming
- Football
- Golf
- Marching Band
- Softball
- Soccer
- Tennis
- Indoor/Outdoor Track and Field
- Volleyball
- Wrestling

== Notable alumni ==
- Chris Ferguson, dirt track racing driver and team owner
- Rickey Hill, college cheerleading and dance coach
- Joe Pacheco, MMA fighter
- Scott Stewart, MLB pitcher
