= Robert Lee Stowe Sr. =

American textile manufacturer and banker (1866–1963)

- Born: 1866; Gaston County, North Carolina, U.S.
- Died: 1963 (aged 96–97)
- Occupations: Textile manufacturer, banker, county commissioner
- Spouse: Nellie Rhyne
- Relatives: Samuel P. Stowe (brother)

Robert Lee Stowe Sr. (1866–1963) was an American textile manufacturer, banker, and local government official based in Belmont, North Carolina. He helped establish Chronicle Mills, Belmont's first textile mill, in 1901. Its development marked the beginning of the town's expansion as a textile manufacturing center.

Working with his brother Samuel P. Stowe and other investors, Stowe participated in several subsequent mill enterprises. He also helped found and became president of the Bank of Belmont, and served on the Gaston County board of commissioners.

== Early life and mercantile career ==
Stowe was born in Gaston County in 1866 to C. T. Stowe and Margaret Ann Sloan. He grew up on the family farm southeast of Belmont, attended local schools, and studied at Captain Bell's Military School in Kings Mountain, North Carolina.

In 1889, Stowe and his brother S. P. opened a general store in Belmont. Robert withdrew from active participation in the store in 1901 to concentrate on cotton manufacturing. The brothers had entered the textile business in 1899 through an investment in Ozark Mills in Gastonia.

== Textile manufacturing ==
=== Chronicle Mills ===
Stowe convened a meeting of local investors to organize a mill in Belmont and raised $85,000. Although he held an interest in Ozark Mills, he had not previously operated a textile mill. Chronicle Mills was chartered on March 18, 1901. The company took its name from Major William Chronicle, a Revolutionary War officer who had lived near the mill site and was killed at the Battle of Kings Mountain.

Machinery began arriving in January 1902, and production started on February 28. The mill initially ran on steam power. In 1908, the company contracted with Southern Power Company for electricity and doubled its production capacity.

=== Expansion of mill interests ===
By 1919, Stowe was secretary and treasurer of Chronicle Mills, Imperial Yarn Mills, and National Yarn Mills, and a director of Majestic Manufacturing Company and Climax Spinning Company.

Majestic Manufacturing Company was established by the Stowe brothers and A. C. Lineberger. Incorporated in September 1907, it encountered difficulties raising stock subscriptions during the Panic of 1907. The partners nevertheless proceeded with a mill designed by architect and textile engineer Stuart W. Cramer. It opened in November 1910 with 10,944 spindles and manufactured fine combed cotton yarn from Egyptian and Sea Island cotton for the hosiery trade.

=== Stowe Spinning Company ===
Stowe Spinning Company was incorporated on February 5, 1920. S. P. Stowe became its president, while Robert served as treasurer and general manager. The mill was constructed in North Belmont on a site served by the Piedmont and Northern Railway. Designed by R. C. Biberstein and Company, it began operating in the late summer of 1921 with 21,760 spindles.

The plant produced combed cotton yarn for knitting and weaving. A mill village of 91 cottages was built alongside it. Together with the settlements associated with Acme, Linford, and Perfection mills, it formed the North Belmont mill community.

=== Depression-era acquisitions and labor relations ===
During the Great Depression, Stowe acquired the closed McAden Mills in McAdenville, using a loan from the Reconstruction Finance Corporation. He co-owned the property with his son Daniel and son-in-law William J. Pharr. They improved the property as production increased at the beginning of World War II.

The 1934 textile strike closed all of Belmont's mills as part of a wider stoppage across Gaston County. A later organizing dispute at Stowe Spinning Company reached the United States Supreme Court in National Labor Relations Board v. Stowe Spinning Co. (1949). Stowe Spinning was one of four mill companies involved in the case, which arose from a union organizer's exclusion from a company-owned meeting hall in 1944. The Court upheld the National Labor Relations Board's finding that the discriminatory refusal constituted an unfair labor practice. It also required the Board's order to be narrowed to prohibit unequal treatment rather than require unconditional access to the hall.

=== Family succession ===
Robert Lee Stowe Jr. joined the mills managed by his father in 1925 and had become their general manager by World War II. After S. P. Stowe's death in 1956, Robert Sr. became president of Stowe Spinning Company, with Robert Jr. serving as treasurer and general manager.

== Banking and public service ==
Stowe helped establish the Bank of Belmont and served as its president. He was also a Gaston County commissioner by 1919.

During the banking crisis of 1932–1933, Stowe personally guaranteed the bank's deposits. The historical account in the Belmont Historic District's National Register nomination credits that guarantee with enabling the bank to remain open.

== Personal life and legacy ==
Stowe married Nellie Rhyne. Their children included Robert Lee Jr., Catherine, and Daniel. His Colonial Revival residence on North Main Street in Belmont was built in 1917. He died in 1963.

Stowe wrote Early History of Belmont and Gaston County, North Carolina, first published in December 1951 and reprinted by Laney-Smith in 1997.

In 1983, Belmont Abbey College renamed its College Building Robert Lee Stowe Hall in his honor.

== Publications ==
- Stowe, Robert Lee (1997) [1951]. Early History of Belmont and Gaston County, North Carolina. Charlotte, North Carolina: Laney-Smith. ISBN 0962448877. OCLC 35627594.
