= Ransom Hunter =

American landowner and philanthropist

- Born: March 14, 1825; Charleston, South Carolina, U.S.
- Died: September 24, 1918 (aged 93); Gaston County, North Carolina, U.S.
- Occupations: Businessman, landowner, community developer, philanthropist

Ransom Hunter (March 14, 1825 – September 24, 1918) was an American businessman, landowner, community developer and philanthropist. He is believed to be the first Black man to own property in Gaston County, North Carolina. Between 1874 and 1913, Hunter conducted thirty financial transaction land deeds with prominent society members of the post-Civil War South. Hunter amassed over 1,920 acres of land during a period when only 1% of Gaston County's black population owned their own farms. Hunter owned the land that is known today as downtown Mount Holly, North Carolina.

== Early life ==
Hunter was born to Mike and Julia Hunter in North Carolina, most likely in Gaston County or the surrounding area. Hunter became a master of carpentry, blacksmithing, and horse grooming, among other trades.

== Land acquisition ==
Hunter began purchasing land within ten years of the abolition of slavery. He conducted a total of thirty financial transactions for land deeds in Lincoln and Gaston counties between 1874 and 1913. His first recorded land deed was a transaction with Robert Calvin Grier Love (R.C.G. Love), a prosperous merchant, banker and textile pioneer, who sold Hunter six acres of waterfront property on the Catawba River. Confederate General Daniel Harvey Hill sold Hunter his second property in 1875. Later, Hunter sold land to two of the future mayors of Mount Holly, W. B. Rutledge and Abel Peterson Rhyne.

== The Freedom Community ==
Hunter opened his first livery stable enterprise on Hawthorne Street in Mount Holly, North Carolina. He applied farrier and blacksmith skills, made horseshoes, and sold and rented a stable of draft horses. With his financial success at the livery stable, he used his profits to purchase surrounding land.

Hunter developed a community he named "Freedom" as a refuge for fellow former slaves who were fleeing post-Civil War hostilities in the South Carolina upcountry. For the first time in their lives, former slaves had their own plot of land to build and raise a family. Initially, much of the land was plagued by soil so rocky that it was deemed unsuitable for farming. As such, the Hunter family nicknamed the area Rock Grove. However, Ransom Hunter saw value in the granite rocks. He employed the men of Freedom to dig up the rocks and sold them to a company as material for the construction of local roads. After removing the rocks, much of the land became acceptable for home construction and arable for farming. Hunter and the community successfully grew acres of corn and cotton and groves of pecan, apple, peach and fig trees. As the Freedom Community thrived, Hunter opened a second livery stable on Main Street in Mount Holly and a general store. Hunter also built a large home for his family in Freedom where he raised livestock. Other freed slaves came to Freedom to start businesses and work on the farm.

Hunter donated land for a school, two churches, and land to become the first cemetery for negro people in Gaston County: Mt. Sinai Baptist Church and Rock Grove A.M.E. Zion Church, now known as Burge Memorial United Methodist Church. In addition to building two churches, Hunter saw the need to formally educate the children in the community. In 1887, Hunter formed a five-member Public School Committee and donated the land for the first school created for black children after slavery ended, named the District 12 Colored School.

== Industrial Revolution ==
Hunter sold land to Abel Peterson Rhyne and Daniel Efird Rhyne to build the area's first cotton mill in 1875. The Mount Holly Manufacturing Mill was constructed on the land which Hunter purchased in 1874 from R.C.G. Love. It was the fourth mill to be built in Gaston County and is the oldest surviving cotton mill today. The name of the mill was derived from the famed yarn mill in Mount Holly, New Jersey, in hopes of taking after their success. The mill's success and the prosperity of the area led local residents to petition the North Carolina General Assembly for the incorporation of Mount Holly in 1879. In 1913, Hunter sold the Mayes Manufacturing Company a stretch of land near the South Fork Catawba River and the Southern Railroad, where they built a cotton textile mill.

== Personal life ==
Hunter married his first wife Rebecca and had 11 children. Rebecca died in 1890. He married his second wife, Maggie Wells Hunter, seven years later and had two children named Torrance and Elmina (Mena). Maggie Hunter died on January 9, 1940, at the age of 79.

== Death and legacy ==
Hunter died on September 24, 1918, at the age of 93. He is buried at the cemetery of Burge Memorial United Methodist Church.

The Mount Holly Historical Society paid tribute to Ransom Hunter's life by naming him their 2017 Historic Person of the Year.

On October 17, 2017, Hunter was featured and celebrated along with the North Carolina Department of Public Instruction in the AT&T 2018 Edition of The Heritage Calendar.

In 2018, two of Hunter's great-great-granddaughters created The Ransom Hunter Foundation to inspire others through his story and promote philanthropic investment in the community.

In 2021, the Gastonia Honey Hunters professional Atlantic League baseball team was named after Ransom Hunter.
