= Methodist University =

Private university in Fayetteville, North Carolina, US

- Former name: Methodist College (1956–2006)
- Motto: Engage, Enrich, Empower
- Type: Private university
- Established: 1956; 70 years ago
- Religious affiliation: United Methodist Church
- Academic affiliations: CONAHEC
- Endowment: $19.483 million
- President: Stanley T. Wearden
- Students: 1,916
- Undergraduates: 1,520
- Postgraduates: 396
- Location: Fayetteville, North Carolina, U.S. 35.1339°N 78.8743°W
- Campus: Urban
- Colors: Methodist Green; Methodist Gold
- Nickname: Monarchs
- Sporting affiliations: NCAA Division III—USASAC
- Mascot: Lion
- Website: methodist.edu
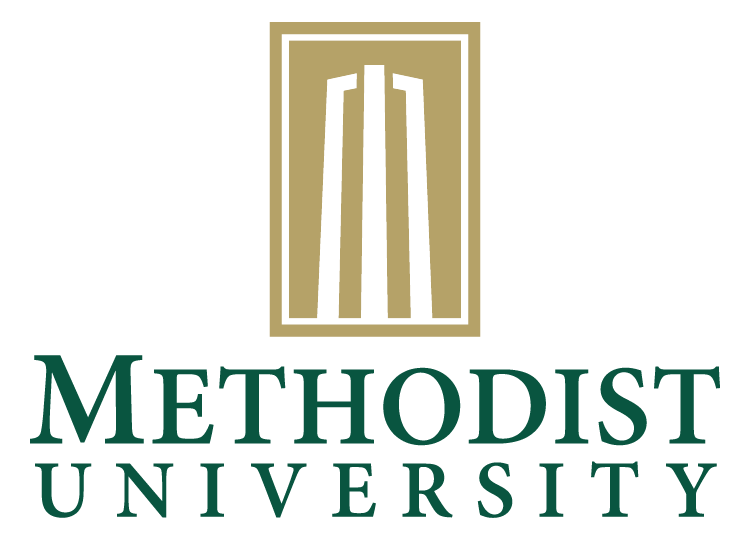

Methodist University is a private university in Fayetteville, North Carolina, United States, that is affiliated with the North Carolina Annual Conference of the United Methodist Church. It is accredited by the Southern Association of Colleges and Schools Commission on Colleges.

The university offers more than 80 undergraduate and graduate degree programs, including doctoral-level options, on campus and online. It offers 22 fully online degrees and certificate programs. Methodist University also features more than 80 student clubs and organizations, along with 20 NCAA intercollegiate sports. It has graduated more than 12,000 students since its first graduating class in 1964.

== History ==
Originally known as Methodist College, the state of North Carolina chartered the school on November 1, 1956. On its 50th anniversary, the board of trustees voted unanimously to change the name from Methodist College to Methodist University. The university has had five presidents in its history:

- L. Stacy Weaver (1957–1973)
- Richard Pearce (1973–1983)
- M. Elton Hendricks (1983–2010)
- Ben E. Hancock, Jr. (2011–2018)
- Stanley T. Wearden (2019–Current)

== Relationship to the United Methodist Church ==
In 2022, president Stanley T. Wearden said, "While Methodist University values its affiliation with The United Methodist Church, the Church does not set the policies of the University." The university also states it provides access and inclusion to all students regardless of their gender, sexual orientation, origin, ethnicity, or creed.

== Academics ==
Academic rankings

Regional
- U.S. News & World Report: 91 (tie) of 123

National
- Washington Monthly: 592 of 602

Methodist University's more than 80 academic programs live under three different colleges: College of Arts, Humanities & Sciences, College of Business, Technology & Professional Studies, and College of Health Sciences & Human Services.

=== College of Arts, Humanities & Sciences ===
The College of Arts, Humanities & Sciences carries six different divisions, each hosting a variety of majors, minors, and certificates:

- Communication, Composition & Rhetoric Division: Communication & Media and Writing
- Fine & Performing Arts Division: Art, Art Education, Graphic Design, Music, Music Composition, Music Education, Music Performance, and Theatre
- Humanities Division: English, Global Studies, History, History with Social Studies Licensure, Spanish, Professional Leadership & Ethics, Religion, Ethics, Global History, Philosophy, Women’s Studies, American Studies, European Studies, and Teaching English as a Second Language
- Justice & Military Science Division: Clandestine Labs, Criminal Justice, Forensic Science (CSI), Digital Forensics, Legal Studies, Military Science, Air Force ROTC, and Army ROTC
- Natural Sciences Division: Biology, Chemistry, General Science Education (9–12), and Science
- Social Sciences Division: Leadership & Management, Political Science, International Relations, Public Administration, Psychology, Sociology, Church Leadership, Cognitive Behavioral Neuropsychology, Leadership Studies, and Public Health

=== College of Business, Technology & Professional Studies ===
The College of Business, Technology & Professional Studies offers five separate divisions that offer a variety of majors, minors, and certificates:

- Reeves School of Business: Accounting, Business Administration, Business Analytics, Financial Economics, Management, Marketing, Sport Management, Health Care Administration, PGA Golf Management, Professional Tennis Management, Economics, Finance, Human Resource Management, International Business, Entrepreneurship and Master of Business Administration (MBA)
- Computer Science & Computer Information Technology: Computer Information Technology and Computer Science
- Engineering & Environmental Studies Division: Engineering, Environmental & Occupational Management, and Environmental Sustainability
- Teacher Education Program: Art Education (K-12), Elementary Education (K-6), English Education (9–12), General Science Education (9–12), History with Social Studies Licensure (9–12), Middle Grades Education (6–9), Music Education (K-12), Physical Education & Health Education (K-12), School Social Work, Special Education: General Curriculum (K-12), Academically & Intellectually Gifted (K-12), Teaching English as a Second Language (K-12), Educational Studies, and Education
- Mathematics & Data Science

=== College of Health Sciences & Human Services ===
Set up a differently than the other two colleges, seven departments (Health Care Administration, Kinesiology, Nursing, Occupational Therapy, Physical Therapy, Physician Assistant, and Social Work) live within the College of Health Sciences & Human Services:

- Undergraduate majors: Advanced Paramedicine, Exercise & Sport Science, Fitness, Wellness & Coaching, Health Care Administration, Kinesiology, Nursing, RN-to-BSN, Occupational Therapy, Physical Education & Health Education, Social Work, Social Work with licensure in School Work
- Undergraduate minors: Community Health Education, Exercise & Sport Science, Gerontology, Health Care Administration, Health Care Information Management, Psychosocial Aspects of Sport & Coaching, and Social Work
- Undergraduate Certificate Programs: Community Health Education, Health Care Administration, and Psychosocial Aspects of Sport & Coaching
- Graduate degree programs: Doctor of Nursing Practice, Doctor of Occupational Therapy, Doctor of Physical Therapy, Master of Health Administration, Master of Medical Science in Physician Assistant Studies, and Master of Nursing
- Graduate Certificate Programs: Health Care Administration and Nursing Education

=== Online programs ===
Methodist University began offering online programs in the 2020–21 school year. Primarily designed to help adult learners, active-duty soldiers and their family members, veterans, and untraditional students, MU offers 24 different programs and certificates:

- Associate degree: General Studies
- Bachelor's degree: Exercise & Sport Science, Professional Leadership and Ethics, Accounting, Health Care Administration (Accounting), Business Administration, Health Care Administration (Business Administration), Advanced Paramedicine, Computer Information Technology, Business Information Systems, Cybersecurity and Information Assurance, Criminal Justice, Health Care Administration, Marketing, Health Care Administration (Marketing), Psychology, Counseling/Clinical Psychology, Human Performance Psychology, Social Work, and RN-to-BSN
- Certificate: Graduate Certificate in Nursing Education, Health Care Administration Certificate, and Post-Baccalaureate Teacher Residency Licensure Certificate
- Doctorate: Doctor of Nursing Practice
- Master's degree: Master of Science in Clinical Mental Health Counseling, Master of Science in Criminal Justice, MEd in Educational Leadership: Instructional Technology, Master of Business Administration (MBA), Master of Health Administration (MHA), and Master of Science in Nursing: Administrative Leadership
- Minors: Accounting, Business Administration, Computer Information Technology, Criminal Justice, Health Care Administration, Marketing, Psychology, and Social Work

=== College of Medicine ===
The Methodist University College of Medicine is home to the Cape Fear Valley Health School of Medicine, which has received preliminary accreditation with the Liaison Committee on Medical Education (LCME).

Conversations between Methodist University and Cape Fear Valley Health System began in the fall of 2022. Both institutions recognized the need for expanded physician services in the Sandhills Region of North Carolina and understood the potential impact of a medical school to have a positive effect on health outcomes in the region.

On February 27, 2023, a formal announcement was made by Methodist University President Stanley T. Wearden and Cape Fear Valley Health CEO Michael Nagowski of a partnership designed to create the medical school.

On May 28, 2023, Hershey S. Bell, MD, MSMedEd, FAAFP was introduced as the Founding Dean of both Methodist University College of Medicine and the Cape Fear Valley Health School of Medicine.

The curriculum emphasizes health systems science and social determinants of health. It will be based on the principles of social accountability, community engagement, and patient-centeredness.

The school is physically positioned on the campus of Cape Fear Valley Medical Center in Fayetteville, North Carolina. The school's inaugural class of about 80 students will matriculate July 2026.

== Athletics ==
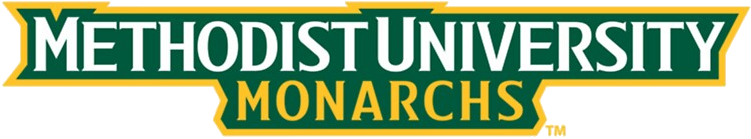
Methodist athletics wordmark

Methodist University teams participate as a member of the National Collegiate Athletic Association's Division III. The Monarchs are a member of the USA South Athletic Conference (USA South). Men's sports include baseball, basketball, cheer, cross country, football, golf, lacrosse, soccer, tennis, and indoor/outdoor track and field. Women's sports include basketball, cheer, cross country, golf, lacrosse, soccer, softball, tennis, indoor/outdoor track and field, and volleyball.

Methodist University's teams have won 83 team and individual national championships along with 183 conference championships. To date, Methodist University has also produced 375 NCAA Division III All-Americans and 65 Academic All-Americans.

== Notable alumni ==
- Becky Burleigh, University of Florida women's soccer coach
- Chad Collins, professional golfer
- Christopher Daniels, professional wrestler
- Ruth Carter Stapleton, evangelist, Christian psychologist
- Chip Dicks, lawyer and former Virginia delegate
- General John W. Handy, USAF (retired)
- William C. Harrison, superintendent
- Rickey Hill, cheerleading and dance coach
- TJR, American DJ and music producer
- Wyatt Worthington II, professional golfer
- Stacey Milbern, disability rights activist
