= Mount Holly, North Carolina =

- City
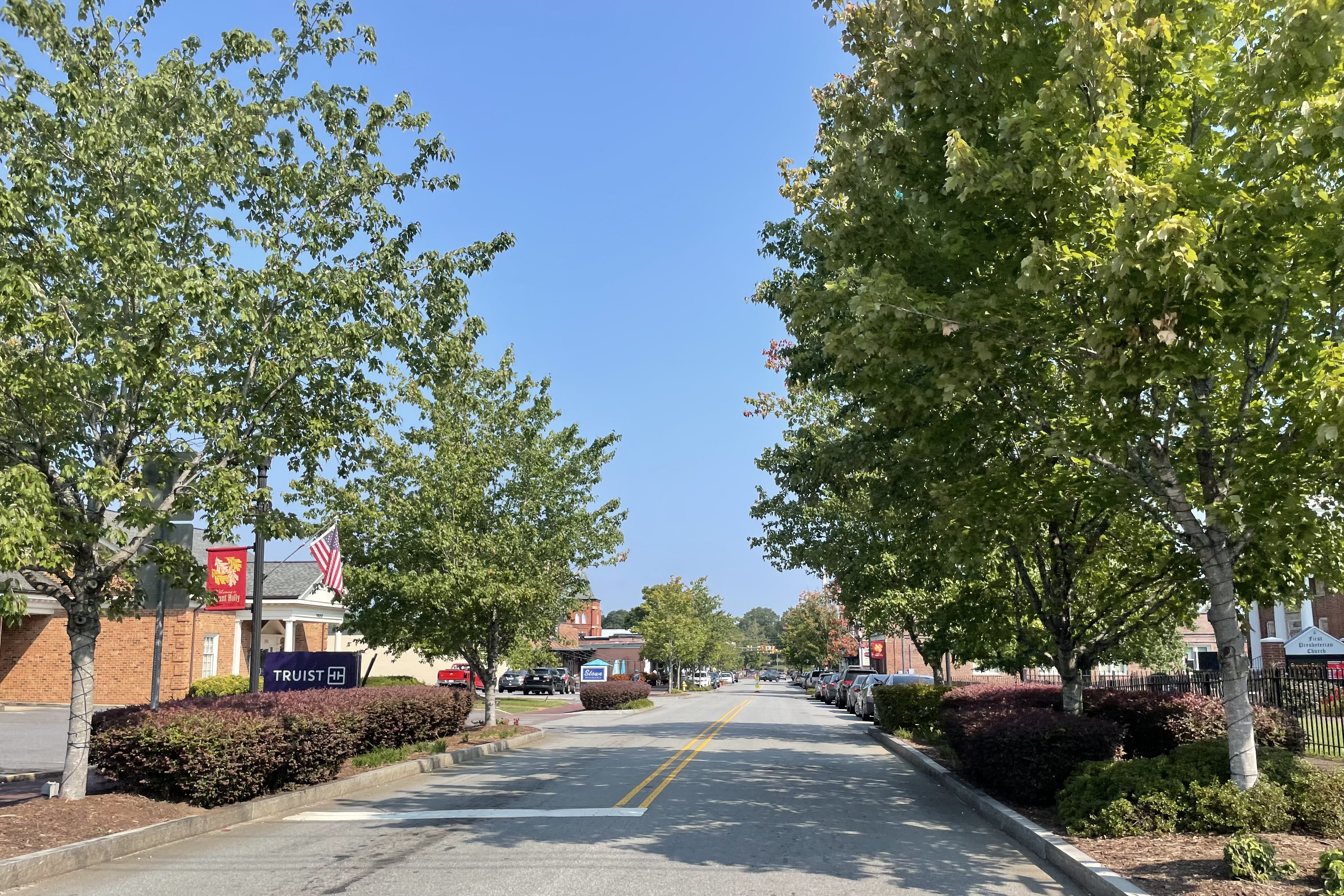
- Downtown Mount Holly

- Seal

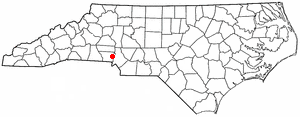
- Location of Mount Holly, North Carolina
- Coordinates: 35°18′51″N 81°00′28″W
- Country: United States
- State: North Carolina
- County: Gaston
- Incorporated: March 11, 1879

Government
  - Mayor: David Moore

Area
  - Total: 11.30 sq mi (29.26 km^{2})
  - Land: 11.22 sq mi (29.05 km^{2})
  - Water: 0.081 sq mi (0.21 km^{2})
- Elevation: 627 ft (191 m)

Population (2020)
  - Total: 17,703
  - Density: 1,578.5/sq mi (609.46/km^{2})
- Time zone: UTC-5 (Eastern (EST))
  - Summer (DST): UTC-4 (Eastern (EDT))
- ZIP code: 28120, 28012
- Area codes: 704, 980
- FIPS code: 37-44960
- GNIS feature ID: 2404319
- Website: www.mtholly.us

Mount Holly is a small suburban city in northeastern Gaston County, North Carolina, United States. The city is situated just west of the Catawba River, north of Interstate 85, south of North Carolina State Highway 16. The population was 17,703 at the 2020 census, up from 13,656 in 2010.

== Geography ==
According to the United States Census Bureau, the city has a total area of 10.0 square miles (25.9 km^{2}), of which 9.8 square miles (25.4 km^{2}) is land and 0.19 square miles (0.5 km^{2}), or 1.98%, is water.

Mount Holly is located 12 miles (19 km) northeast of Gastonia.

== History ==
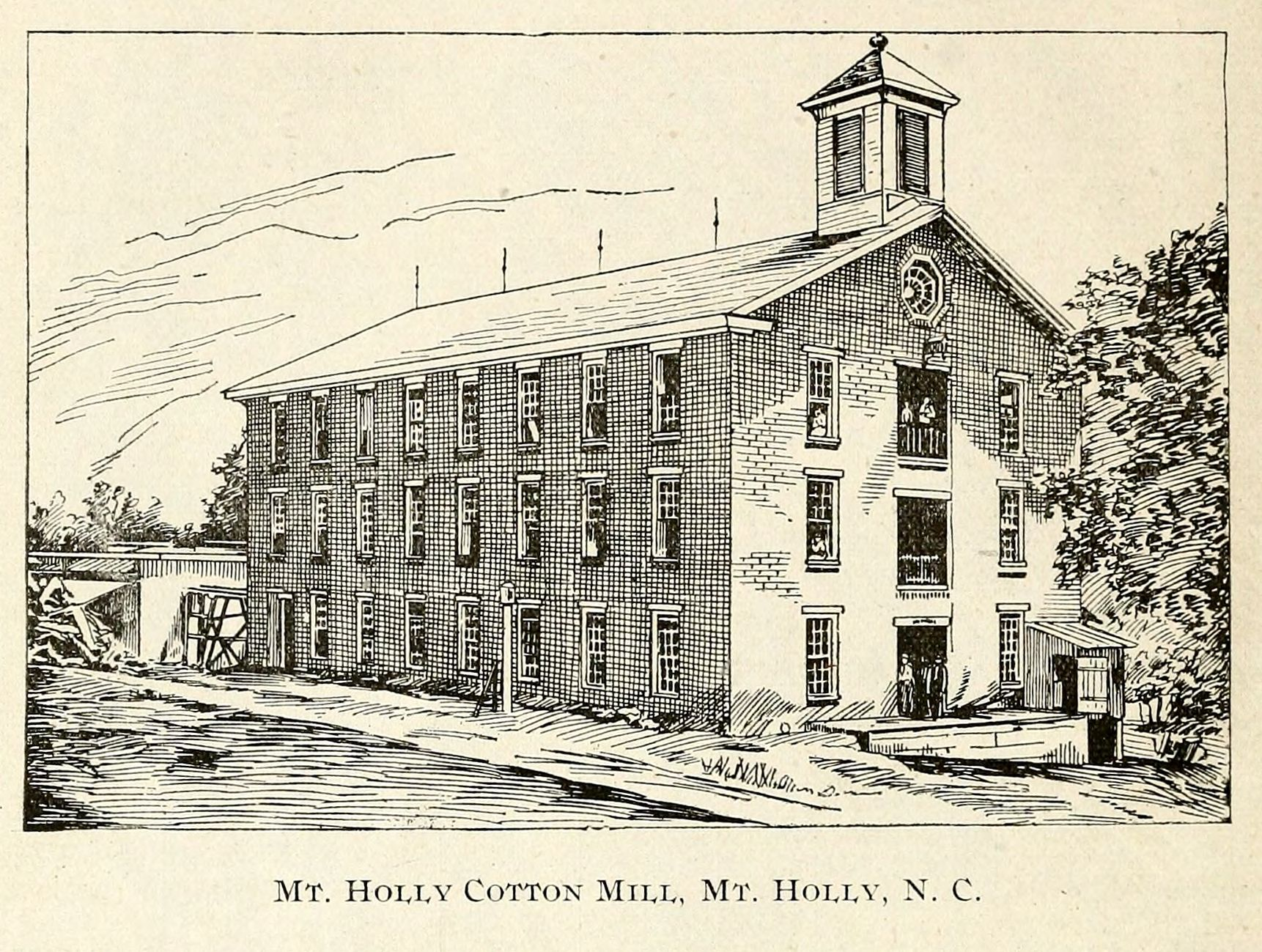
Mount Holly Cotton Mill

Land grants were first issued in the Mount Holly area by King George II of Great Britain around 1750. In 1754, a land grant was issued to James Kuykendall of Holland in the locale known as Dutchman's Creek. Later in 1838, a post office in the area was named Woodlawn. In 1875, the name of the town was changed to Mount Holly, after the Mount Holly Cotton Mill that was started that year. The name "Mount Holly" was used in recognition of the famed yarn made at a spinning mill in Mount Holly, New Jersey.

A.P. and D.E. Rhyne and Ambrose Costner originally owned the Mount Holly Cotton Mill. It was the fourth mill to be built in Gaston County and is the oldest surviving mill today. The mill's success and the prosperity of the area as a whole led local residents to petition the North Carolina General Assembly for incorporation of Mount Holly in 1879.

The first railroad in Gaston County, the Carolina Central Railway, began serving Mount Holly in 1860. The line, which runs parallel with North Carolina State Highway 27, is still in service and operated by CSX. In 1911, construction began on the area's second railroad, the Piedmont and Northern Railway. On May 20, 1912, it made its first run from Charlotte to Gastonia.

Electricity became available to homes and businesses around the turn of the nineteenth century. The Woodlawn Mill, located on Woodlawn Avenue, was built in 1906 and was the first mill in Gaston County to be served with electricity.

The Downtown Mount Holly Historic District and Mount Holly Cotton Mill are listed on the National Register of Historic Places.

== Demographics ==
Historical population
Census	Pop.	Note	%±
1890	472		—
1900	630		33.5%
1910	526		−16.5%
1920	1,160		120.5%
1930	2,254		94.3%
1940	2,055		−8.8%
1950	2,241		9.1%
1960	4,037		80.1%
1970	5,107		26.5%
1980	4,530		−11.3%
1990	7,710		70.2%
2000	9,618		24.7%
2010	13,656		42.0%
2020	17,703		29.6%
2025 (est.)	19,033	▲	7.5%
U.S. Decennial Census

=== 2020 census ===
As of the 2020 census, Mount Holly had a population of 17,703. The median age was 38.8 years. 23.3% of residents were under the age of 18 and 12.9% of residents were 65 years of age or older. For every 100 females there were 94.0 males, and for every 100 females age 18 and over there were 90.2 males age 18 and over.

99.5% of residents lived in urban areas, while 0.5% lived in rural areas.

There were 7,197 households in Mount Holly, of which 33.4% had children under the age of 18 living in them. Of all households, 46.6% were married-couple households, 18.1% were households with a male householder and no spouse or partner present, and 28.0% were households with a female householder and no spouse or partner present. About 27.7% of all households were made up of individuals and 8.6% had someone living alone who was 65 years of age or older. The city had 3,846 families.

There were 7,687 housing units, of which 6.4% were vacant. The homeowner vacancy rate was 2.0% and the rental vacancy rate was 6.5%.

Mount Holly racial composition
Race	Number	Percentage
White (non-Hispanic)	11,734	66.28%
Black or African American (non-Hispanic)	3,189	18.01%
Native American	50	0.28%
Asian	495	2.79%
Pacific Islander	8	0.05%
Other/Mixed	879	4.97%
Hispanic or Latino	1,349	7.62%

=== 2010 census ===
The racial composition of the city in 2010 was: 76.3% White, 15.8% Black or African American, 2.60% Asian American, 7.3% Hispanic or Latino American, 0.1% Native American, 0.0% Native Hawaiian or Other Pacific Islander, 0.75% some other race, and 0.9% two or more races.

=== 2000 census ===
As of the census of 2000, there were 9,618 people, 4,028 households, and 2,658 families residing in the city. The population density was 1,236.3 inhabitants per square mile (477.3/km^{2}). There were 4,241 housing units at an average density of 545.2 per square mile (210.5/km^{2}).

There were 4,028 households, out of which 29.5% had children under the age of 18 living with them, 47.1% were married couples living together, 14.0% had a female householder with no husband present, and 34.0% were non-families. 27.9% of all households were made up of individuals, and 10.2% had someone living alone who was 65 years of age or older. The average household size was 2.37 and the average family size was 2.89.

In the city, the population was spread out, with 23.4% under the age of 18, 8.4% from 18 to 24, 34.3% from 25 to 44, 20.6% from 45 to 64, and 13.3% who were 65 years of age or older. The median age was 35 years. For every 100 females, there were 92.6 males. For every 100 females age 18 and over, there were 88.4 males.

The median income for a household in the city was $39,459, and the median income for a family was $46,295. Males had a median income of $32,128 versus $23,965 for females. The per capita income for the city was $20,161. About 8.2% of families and 10.8% of the population were below the poverty line, including 16.5% of those under age 18 and 8.5% of those age 65 or over.

== Government ==
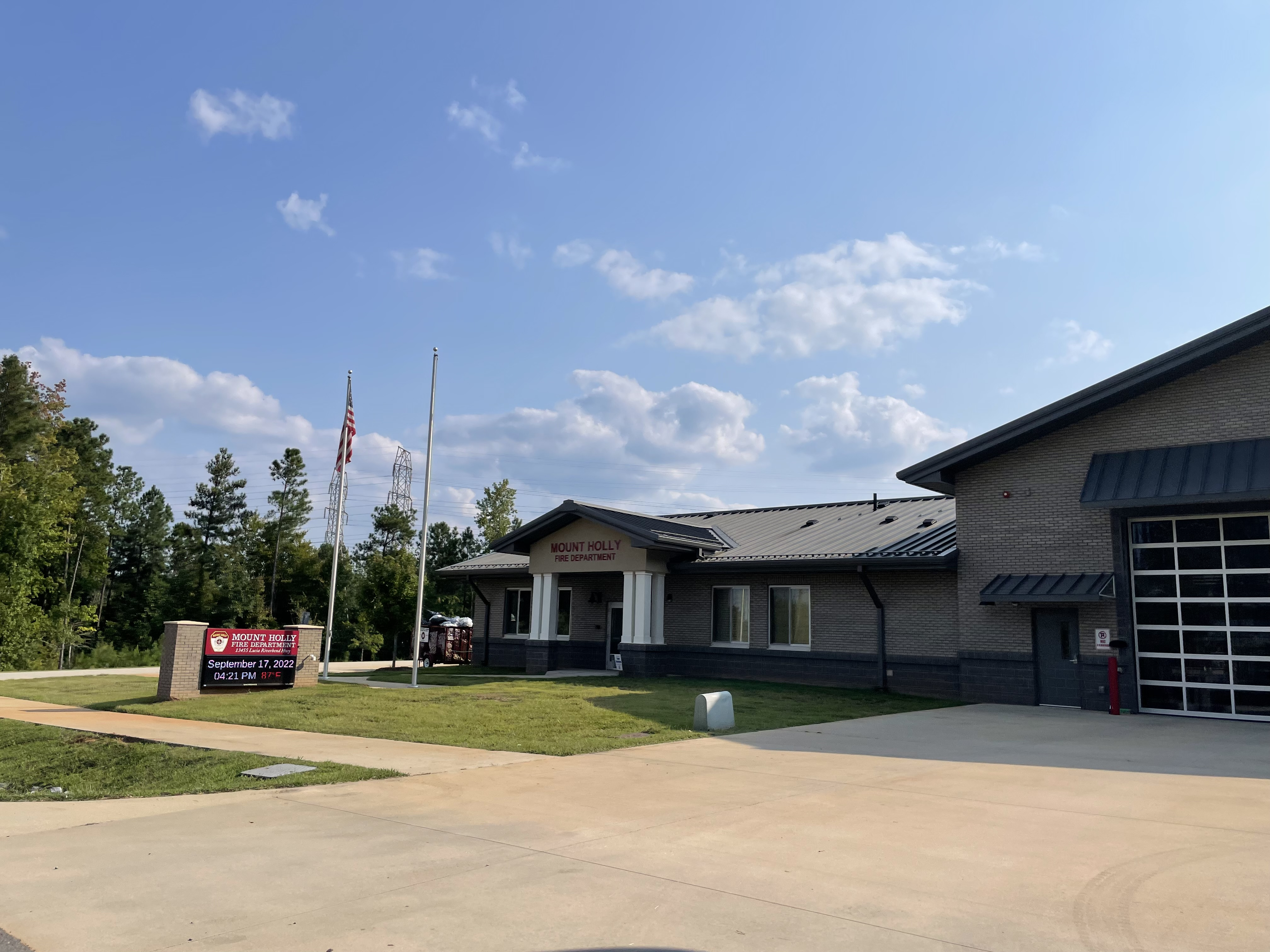
Mount Holly Fire Department

The City of Mount Holly has a Council-Manager form of government with a mayor and six council members. The mayor is elected every four years in November, and the council members, elected at-large, serve four-year staggered terms. The city council appoints a professional city manager to run the day-to-day operations.

== Education ==
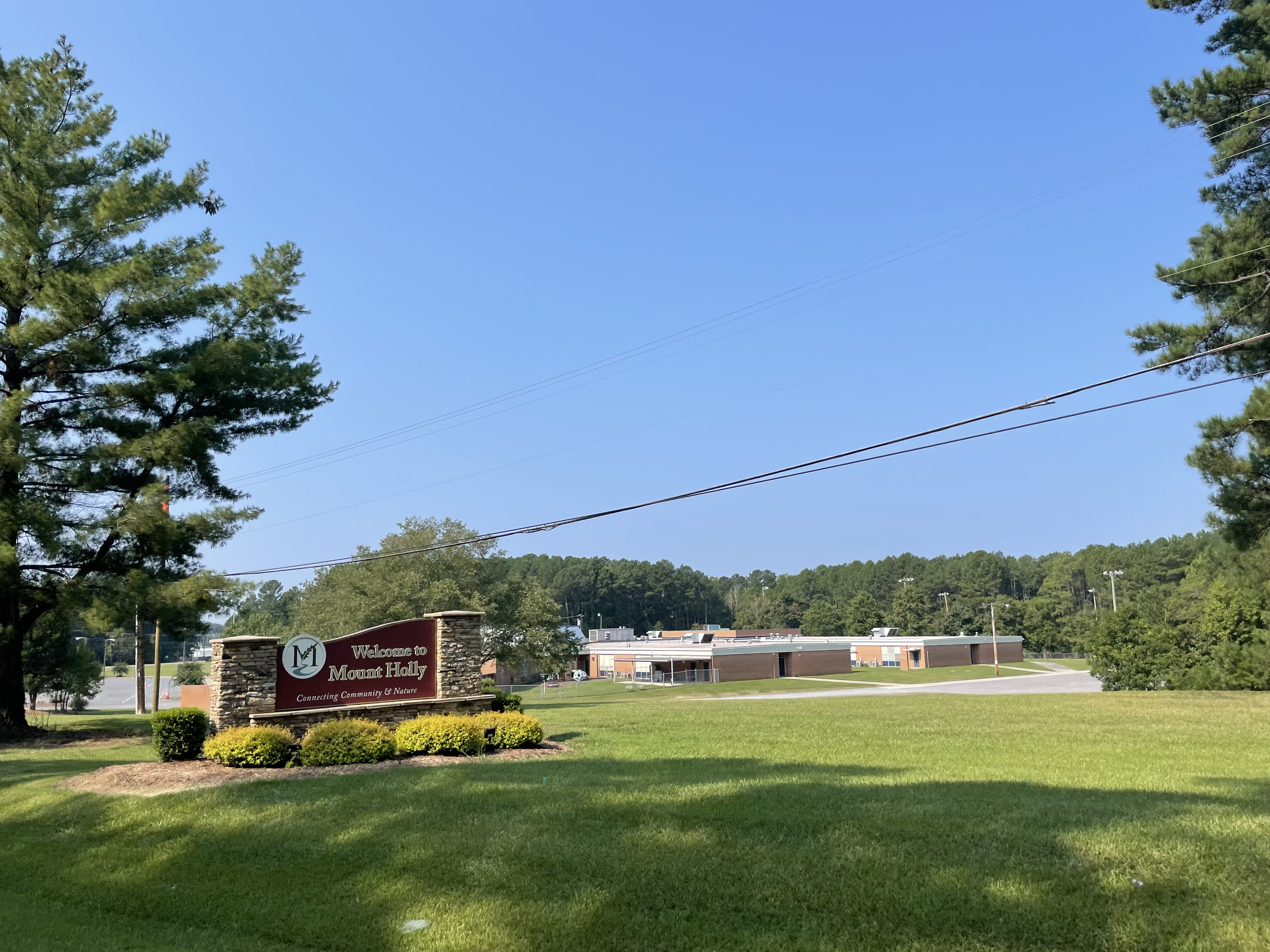
Mount Holly city sign

Three elementary schools (Pinewood, Catawba Heights and Ida Rankin), Mount Holly Middle School, East Gaston High School and Stuart W. Cramer High School are the public schools that serve Mount Holly. All six schools are part of the Gaston County Schools. Mountain Island Charter School is also located near Mount Holly near Highway 16. Because of Mount Holly's location, residents there have access to a number of public and private colleges and universities, including Belmont Abbey College, Gaston College, Central Piedmont Community College, Queens University of Charlotte, Pfeiffer University, Johnson and Wales University, the University of North Carolina at Charlotte, and Johnson C. Smith University.

The Mount Holly Branch of the Gaston County Public Library serves this community.

== Economy ==
Improvements in the regional transportation network and the economic growth of the Charlotte-Mecklenburg area, and Mount Holly's strategic location between Charlotte and Gastonia, have created conditions for an expanding population in recent years.

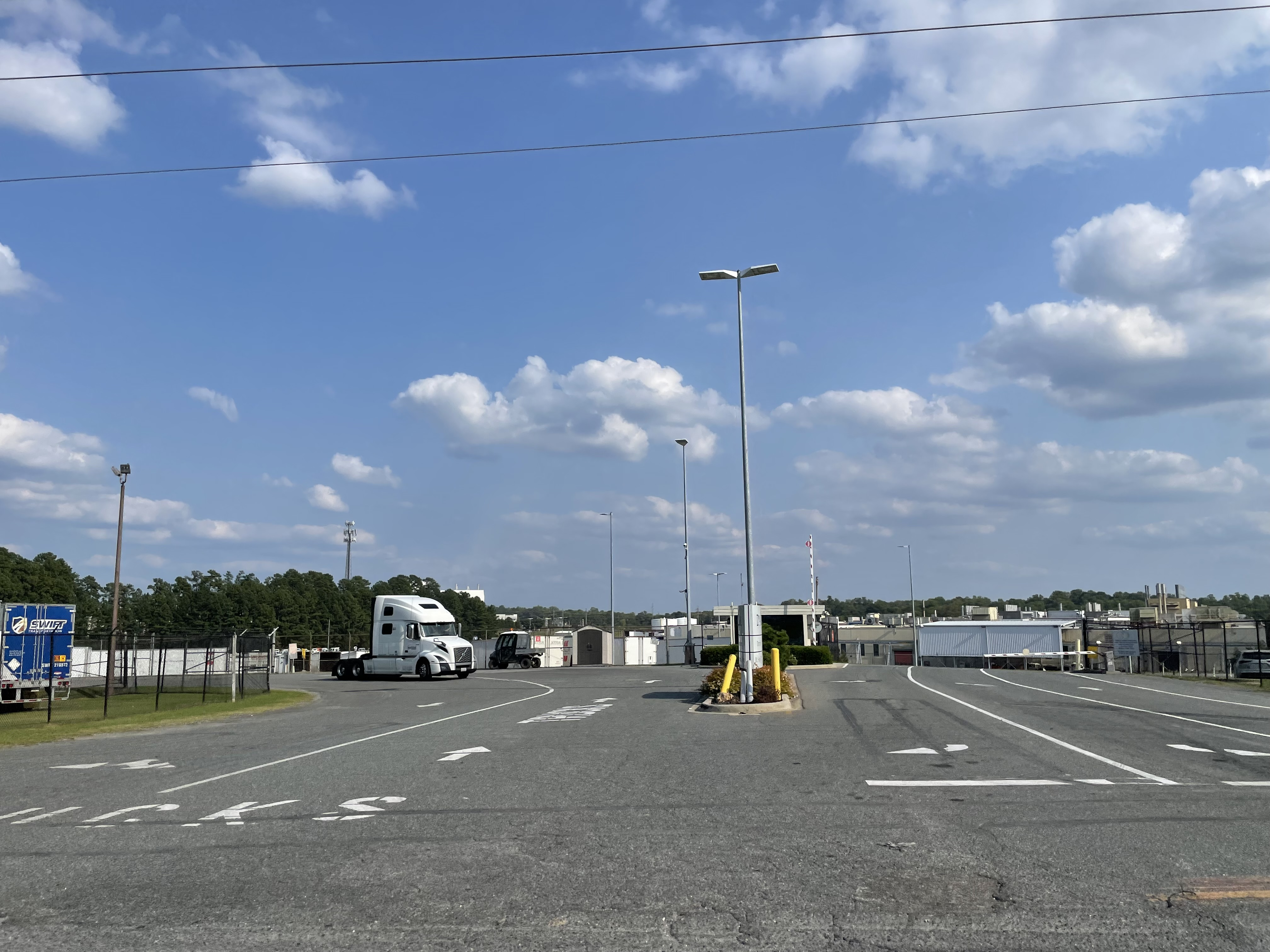
Freightliner manufacturing facility in Mount Holly

The textile industry continues to play a significant role in the Mount Holly area. The Gaston County Economic Development Commission's current manufacturing directory lists 19 manufacturing firms in the area, ten of which are textile related. The city's largest textile firm is American & Efird, Inc. (A&E), the world's second-largest thread maker. The firm was created with a 1952 merger of American Yarn and Processing Company (located in Mount Holly) and the Efird Manufacturing Company (located in Albemarle, North Carolina). American Yarn had its start in 1891 when Charles Egbert Hutchison founded the Nims Manufacturing Company on Dutchman's Creek. With six plants and their corporate offices in Mount Holly, A&E employs more than 980 people and maintains a strong presence in the community. In 1990, the Freightliner Trucks manufacturing plant was annexed into the city. Freightliner and its subsidiary businesses have been a significant employer in Mount Holly since 1979.

Since 2007 National Gypsum has operated a wallboard plant in Mount Holly. While gypsum wallboard is typically produced from gypsum rock, the Mount Holly plant uses byproduct gypsum produced by sulfur dioxide scrubbers at four of Duke Power's coal-fired power plants.

Mount Holly's historic downtown district includes several restaurants, several churches, a coffee shop, salons and retail offerings in addition to offices, banks and other businesses.

== Notable people ==
- R. B. Babington, businessman, telecommunications pioneer, banker, and alderman
- Chris Ferguson, professional racing driver and team owner
- Virgil Lee Griffin, Ku Klux Klan leader
- Jimmie Hall, MLB outfielder, 2x All-Star selection
- Mitch Harris, MLB pitcher
- Rickey Hill, college cheerleading coach and choreographer
- Ransom Hunter, businessman, landowner, community developer and philanthropist
- Chink Outen, MLB catcher
- Joe Pacheco, mixed martial artist
- Scott Stewart, MLB pitcher
