= Tanner Muse =

American football player (born 1996)

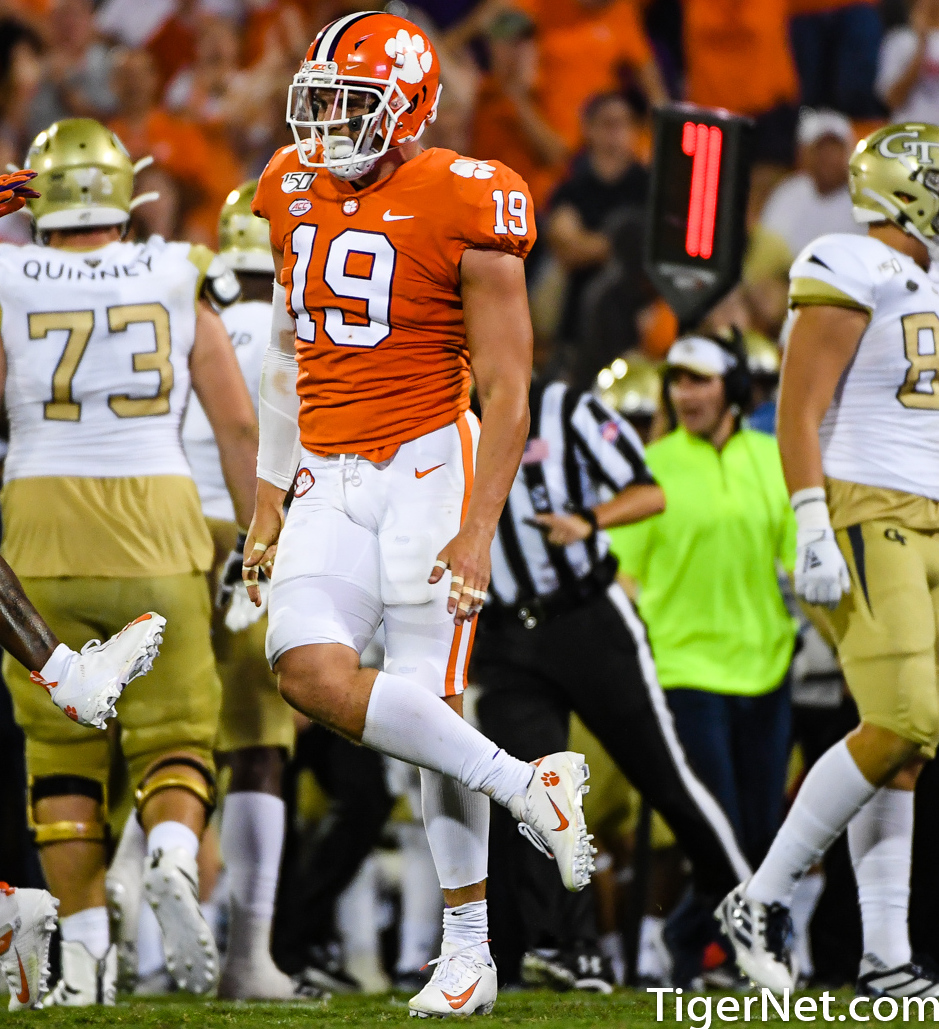
- Muse with the Clemson Tigers in 2019

Profile
- Position: Linebacker

Personal information
- Born: September 6, 1996 (age 30); Belmont, North Carolina, U.S.
- Listed height: 6 ft 2 in (1.88 m)
- Listed weight: 227 lb (103 kg)

Career information
- High school: South Point (Belmont)
- College: Clemson (2015–2019)
- NFL draft: 2020: 3rd round, 100th overall pick

Career history
- Las Vegas Raiders (2020); Seattle Seahawks (2021–2022); Pittsburgh Steelers (2023)*; Los Angeles Chargers (2023); Jacksonville Jaguars (2024)*
- * Offseason or practice squad member only

Awards and highlights
- 2× CFP national champion (2016, 2018); Third-team All-American (2019); First-team All-ACC (2019); Third-team All-ACC (2018)

Career NFL statistics as of 2024
- Total tackles: 23
- Pass deflections: 1
- Stats at Pro Football Reference

Tanner Muse (born September 6, 1996) is an American professional football linebacker. He played college football at Clemson and was selected by the Las Vegas Raiders in the third round of the 2020 NFL draft. He is currently the Jackman for the #43, Eric Jones, with Legacy Motor Club in the NASCAR Cup Series.

== Early life ==
Muse grew up in Belmont, North Carolina and attended South Point High School, where he played center field on the baseball team and running back, safety, and long snapper on the football team. As a senior, Muse was named first team All-State after recording 150 tackles with four interceptions on defense while also rushing for 1,292 yards. Muse was rated a four star recruit and committed to play college football and baseball at Clemson going into his senior year over offers from Michigan, Louisville and Northwestern.

== College career ==
Muse redshirted his true-freshman season and decided not to play baseball in order to participate in Clemson's spring practices. The following season he played in all 15 of Clemson's games as a reserve safety and on special teams, making 24 total tackles as the Tigers won the 2016 National Championship. He became a starter as a redshirt sophomore and finished the season with 64 tackles, two tackles for loss, four passes broken up and a 63-yard fumble return for a touchdown. As a redshirt junior, he recorded 76 tackles, 2.5 tackles for loss, five pass breakups, two sacks, and two interceptions and was named third team All-Atlantic Coast Conference (ACC) as the Tigers won the 2018 National Championship. Muse was named first team All-ACC and a third team All-American by the Associated Press as a redshirt senior after recording 73 tackles, six tackles for loss, two sacks, five passes broken up and a team-leading four interceptions.

== Professional career ==
Pre-draft measurables
Height	Weight	Arm length	Hand span	40-yard dash	10-yard split	20-yard split	20-yard shuttle	Three-cone drill	Vertical jump	Broad jump	Bench press
6 ft 2 in (1.88 m)	227 lb (103 kg)	31 1/2 in (0.80 m)	9 in (0.23 m)	4.41 s	1.56 s	2.60 s	4.12 s	6.94 s	34.5 in (0.88 m)	10 ft 4 in (3.15 m)	20 reps
All values from NFL Combine/Pro Day

=== Las Vegas Raiders ===
Muse was selected by the Las Vegas Raiders in the third round with the 100th overall pick in the 2020 NFL draft. He was placed on injured reserve on September 7, 2020, with a foot injury. Muse underwent season-ending surgery on his toe on November 3. He was placed on the reserve/COVID-19 list by the team on December 3, and moved back to injured reserve on December 22.

On September 6, 2021, Muse was waived by the Raiders without ever taking a snap for the team in the regular season.

=== Seattle Seahawks ===
On September 8, 2021, Muse was signed to the practice squad of the Seattle Seahawks. He was promoted to the active roster on December 15.

On August 30, 2022, Muse was waived by the Seahawks and signed to the practice squad the next day. He was signed to the active roster on September 14.

=== Pittsburgh Steelers ===
On April 17, 2023, Muse signed with the Pittsburgh Steelers. He was waived by the Steelers on August 28.

=== Los Angeles Chargers ===
On August 30, 2023, Muse was claimed off the waivers by the Los Angeles Chargers.

=== Jacksonville Jaguars ===
On July 30, 2024, Muse signed with the Jacksonville Jaguars. He was released on August 27, and re-signed to the practice squad. Muse was released by Jacksonville on November 5.

== Personal ==
He is married to Sydney Muse. His younger brother, Nick Muse, is a tight end who played college football at South Carolina and was drafted in the 7th round (227 overall) by the Minnesota Vikings in the 2022 NFL draft.
