= North Charlotte Historic District =

Historic district in North Carolina, United States

- U.S. National Register of Historic Places
- U.S. Historic district
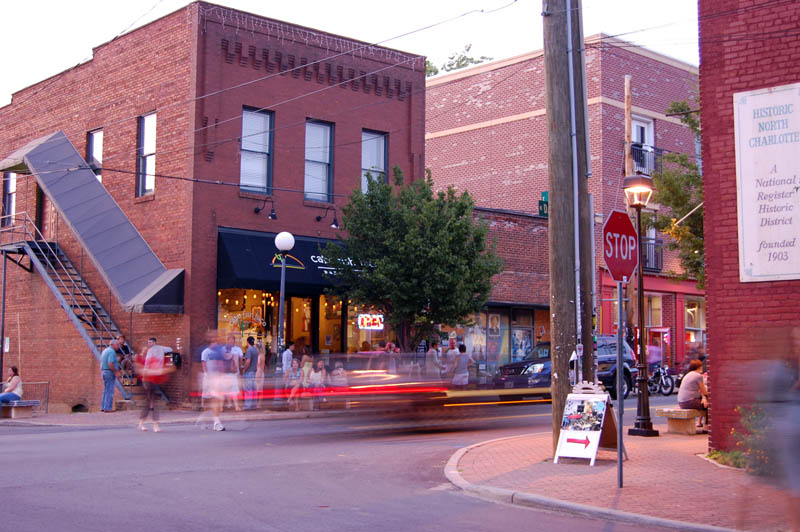

- Location within North Carolina Location within the United States
- Location: Roughly bounded by the Southern Railroad, Herrin St., Spencer St., and Charles Ave., Charlotte, North Carolina
- Coordinates: 35°14′44″N 80°48′19″W
- Area: 155.5 acres (62.9 ha)
- Built: 1903
- Built by: North Charlotte Realty
- Architect: Stuart Warren Cramer
- Architectural style: Bungalow/American Craftsman, Late Victorian, Vernacular Victorian,
- NRHP reference No.: 90000367
- Added to NRHP: March 16, 1990

The North Charlotte Historic District is a 155.5-acre (62.9 ha) national historic district located in Charlotte, Mecklenburg County, North Carolina. The listing included 282 contributing buildings and four contributing structures. It includes work designed by architect Stuart Warren Cramer; it includes Bungalow/craftsman, Late Victorian, vernacular Victorian, reflecting turn-of-the-century mill-village architecture. Located in the district is the separately listed Highland Park Mill No. 3. Other notable buildings include the Mecklenburg Mill (later Mercury Mills, 1905), Johnston Mill (1913), Grinnell Manufacturing Company, Hand Pharmacy Building (1904), Lowder Building (1927), the former Highland Inn (c. 1903), Charlotte Fire Department Engine Company No. 9 (1937), and North Charlotte Primary School.

It was listed on the National Register of Historic Places in 1990.
