= Stuart W. Cramer High School =

American public school in North Carolina

Location
- 101 Lakewood Road; Belmont, North Carolina 28012; United States; 35°14′43″N 81°03′32″W

Information
- Type: Public
- Established: 2013 (13 years ago)
- School district: Gaston County Schools
- CEEB code: 340294
- Principal: Dr. Jessica Steiner
- Staff: 53.40 (FTE)
- Enrollment: 953 (2024–2025)
- Student to teacher ratio: 17.85
- Colors: Purple, silver, and black
- Team name: Storm
- Rivals: South Point High School, East Gaston High School, and Forestview High School
- Website: gaston.k12.nc.us/stuartwcramer

Stuart W. Cramer High School is a public high school in the Gaston County Schools district located in Cramerton, North Carolina (though its mailing address says Belmont). The schools attendance range covers the central portion of eastern Gaston County and includes all of the towns of Cramerton and McAdenville, and portions of Belmont and Mount Holly. Dr. Jessica Steiner serves as principal. Assistant principals include Antina Avery, Sydney McDaniel and Patrick Watson. Mike Patton serves as athletic director.

== Naming ==
The school was named for Stuart W. Cramer (1868–1940) of Thomasville, North Carolina. Cramer was the founder of Cramerton, North Carolina, a leading industrialist in the textiles and air conditioning industries, and one of the founding partners of Duke Power.

== History ==
In 2007, Gaston County voters approved a $175 million bond package that included the construction costs for a new high school in the fast-growing eastern portion of Gaston County, intended to relieve overcrowding at East Gaston High School and South Point High School. The 138-acre site of the former Lakewood Golf Course was chosen as the school location, with the new school being built on the 99-acres on the east side of Lakewood Road.

The school was designed by Boomerang Design/MBAJ Architecture P.A., and the primary construction contract was executed by Shelco Construction Company, both of Charlotte, North Carolina. Total building construction costs were $38.6 million, or $53.4 million in current value. Total cost for the entire project including athletic facilities, roadways, parking lots and ground works was $63 million, or $87.1 million in current value.

Stuart W. Cramer High School opened in 2013 with 550 students in grades 9 and 10. In 2014, two staff members were named Outstanding Educators for Gaston County.

== Facilities ==
The building has 268,000 square feet of built floor space, and is currently built to house 1,200 students. The school was designed for expansion to 288,214 square feet of floor space to accommodate expansion to 1,500 students. The school, set on 90 acres of campus, was featured as one of eleven model examples in American School and University magazine's 2014 Architectural Portfolio, recognizing it as a national model in educational architectural design. Its football stadium was built at the time of school opening, seating 3000 people and featuring the first artificial turf field in the county. The L. Reeves McGlohon Auditorium, named for the serving Gaston County Schools Superintendent at the time, seats 1,500 and is the largest auditorium in the county.
