= Nick Muse =

American football player (born 1998)

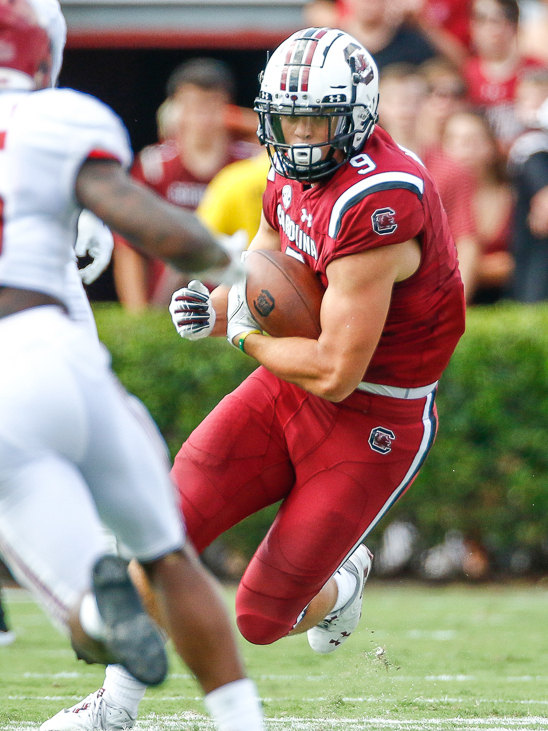
- Muse with the South Carolina Gamecocks in 2019

No. 87 – Atlanta Falcons
- Position: Tight end
- Roster status: Active

Personal information
- Born: November 25, 1998 (age 27); Belmont, North Carolina, U.S.
- Listed height: 6 ft 5 in (1.96 m)
- Listed weight: 252 lb (114 kg)

Career information
- High school: South Point (Belmont)
- College: William & Mary (2017–2018); South Carolina (2019–2021)
- NFL draft: 2022: 7th round, 227th overall pick

Career history
- Minnesota Vikings (2022–2024); Philadelphia Eagles (2024)*; Arizona Cardinals (2025)*; Los Angeles Rams (2025)*; New York Jets (2025)*; Detroit Lions (2026)*; Atlanta Falcons (2026–present)
- * Offseason or practice squad member only

Awards and highlights
- Super Bowl champion (LIX); Third-team All-CAA (2018)

Career NFL statistics as of Week 9, 2026
- Receptions: 3
- Receiving yards: 24
- Receiving touchdowns: 1
- Stats at Pro Football Reference

Nicholas Muse (born November 25, 1998) is an American professional football tight end for the Atlanta Falcons of the National Football League (NFL). He played college football for the William & Mary Tribe and South Carolina Gamecocks.

== Early life ==
Muse grew up in Belmont, North Carolina, and attended South Point High School.

== College career ==
Muse began his college career at William & Mary. As a freshman, he caught four passes for 55 yards and one touchdown. Muse was named third-team All-Colonial Athletic Association as a sophomore after finishing the season with 30 receptions for 453 yards and one touchdown. After the season, he transferred to South Carolina.

Muse caught 17 passes for 158 yards in his first season with the Gamecocks. As a senior, he had 30 receptions for 425 yards and one touchdown. Muse decided to utilize the extra year of eligibility granted to college athletes who played in the 2020 season due to the coronavirus pandemic and return to South Carolina for a third season. He caught 20 passes for 222 yards with two touchdowns in his final season.

== Professional career ==
Pre-draft measurables
Height	Weight	Arm length	Hand span	Wingspan	40-yard dash	10-yard split	20-yard split	20-yard shuttle	Three-cone drill	Vertical jump	Broad jump	Bench press
6 ft 4 3/8 in (1.94 m)	259 lb (117 kg)	31 3/4 in (0.81 m)	9 1/2 in (0.24 m)	6 ft 5 3/8 in (1.97 m)	4.71 s	1.63 s	2.71 s	4.26 s	7.09 s	30.5 in (0.77 m)	9 ft 3 in (2.82 m)	27 reps
All values from Pro Day

=== Minnesota Vikings ===
Muse was selected by the Minnesota Vikings with the 227th overall pick in the seventh round of the 2022 NFL draft. He was waived on August 30, 2022, and re-signed to the practice squad one day later. Muse was signed to the 53-man roster on November 19. Muse was waived on January 6, 2023, and re-signed to the practice squad. He signed a reserve/future contract on January 16.

Muse was released on November 26, 2024, and re-signed to the practice squad.

=== Philadelphia Eagles ===
On January 22, 2025, the Philadelphia Eagles signed Muse to their practice squad. He won a Super Bowl championship when the Eagles defeated the Kansas City Chiefs, 40–22 in Super Bowl LIX. Muse signed a reserve/future contract with Philadelphia on February 14. Muse was waived by Philadelphia on August 26, as a part of final roster cuts.

=== Arizona Cardinals ===
On October 8, 2025, Muse signed with the Arizona Cardinals' practice squad. He was released by the Cardinals on October 28.

=== Los Angeles Rams ===
On November 11, 2025, Muse signed with the Los Angeles Rams' practice squad. He was released on December 9.

=== New York Jets ===
On December 10, 2025, Muse signed with the New York Jets' practice squad.

=== Detroit Lions ===
On August 3, 2026, Muse signed with the Detroit Lions. He was released by Detroit on August 9.

=== Atlanta Falcons ===
On August 11, 2026, Muse signed with the Atlanta Falcons. On August 30, Muse was released by Atlanta as a part of final roster cuts; he was re-signed to the team's practice squad the next day. On September 16, Muse was signed to the active roster. In Atlanta's Week 7 upset victory over the San Francisco 49ers, Muse recorded his first career touchdown on a one–yard reception from Michael Penix Jr.

== Personal life ==
Muse's older brother, Tanner Muse, played college football at Clemson and most recently played for the Jacksonville Jaguars.
