= Mayworth School =

Historic school building in North Carolina, United States

- U.S. National Register of Historic Places
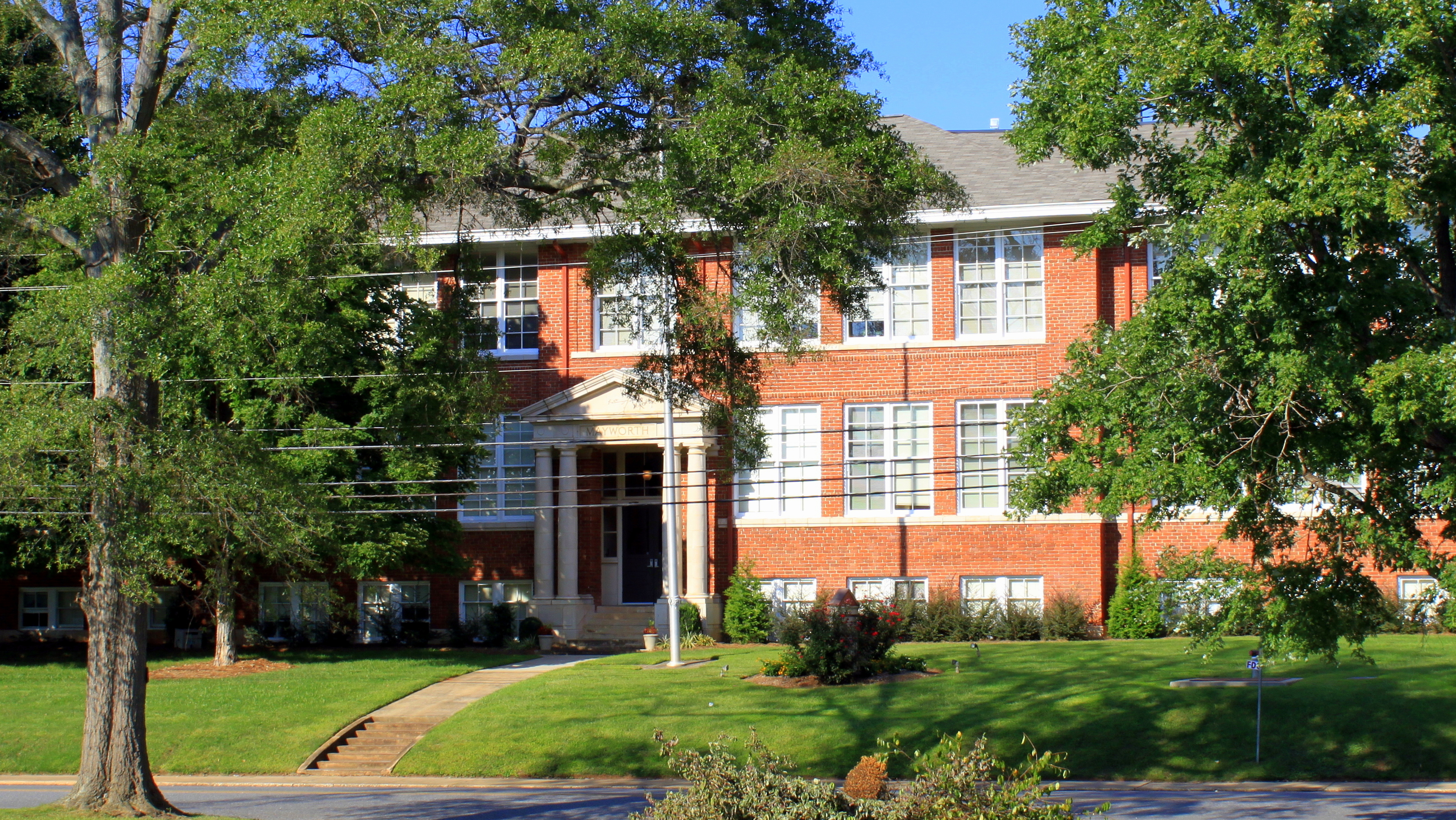

- Location within North Carolina Location within the United States
- Location: 236 Eighth Ave., Cramerton, North Carolina
- Coordinates: 35°14′26″N 81°4′32″W
- Area: 3 acres (1.2 ha)
- Built: 1921
- Architect: Cramer, Stuart
- Architectural style: Classical Revival
- NRHP reference No.: 02000986
- Added to NRHP: September 16, 2002

The Mayworth School, also known as Cramerton School, is a historic school complex located at 236 Eighth Ave. in Cramerton, Gaston County, North Carolina. It was designed by architect Stuart W. Cramer and built in 1921 in the Classical Revival style. It is a two- and three-story red brick building with a hipped roof and pedimented portico. A two-story rear wing was added in 1930. Also located on the property are the contributing gymnasium (1939) and swimming pool (1945).

It was listed on the National Register of Historic Places in 2002.
