= R. B. Babington =

American businessman

Robert Benjamin Babington
- The Gastonia Gazette, 1920
- Born: Robert Benjamin Babington; August 24, 1869; Lincoln County, North Carolina, U.S.
- Died: November 28, 1935 (aged 66)
- Known for: Founder of the North Carolina Orthopaedic Hospital

Robert Benjamin ("R.B." or "Bob") Babington (August 24, 1869 – November 28, 1935) was a businessman, telecommunications pioneer, banker, alderman of Gastonia, North Carolina, President of the defunct Armington Hotel Co., founder of the North Carolina Orthopaedic Hospital, and high-ranking Freemason. His fame led to his inclusion in Leonard Wilson's 1916 book series "Makers of America: Biographies of Leading Men of Thought and Action".

== Beginnings ==
Babington was born August 25, 1869, in Lincoln County, North Carolina, to Elisha Babington and Margaret Isabelle Haynes. Elisha Babington was a foundryman and builder, in fact, Babington was born at a site called Reinhardt's furnace, a vestige of the charcoal-powered iron industry that flourished in North Carolina's Southern Piedmont and was being replaced by cotton mills and the railroads as the 19th century expired. One source connects his father's line to an old foundry and bell-casting enterprise in New Jersey after an unknown Babington immigrated from England. His mother's genealogy contains North Carolina planters and one Revolutionary Veteran Robertson Goodwin permitting Babington entry into the Sons of the American Revolution while his maternal uncle was the sheriff of Lincoln County.

== Career ==
He was educated in Charlotte, North Carolina, at Macon High School before moving to Winston Graded School and Boys Male Academy in Winston, NC and Salem, NC, respectively. Aged 17, he began work as a railroad agent and a telegraphic operator. Over the course of thirteen years in the industry he received several promotions. A keen follower of new inventions, he started working with telephones in 1895 and built the first independent lines in his region of North Carolina. These included a line between the Depot of the Seaboard Air Line Railway, the Post Office, and his own home in Mount Holly, North Carolina. Mt. Holly's first telephone exchange, which he built, started with twenty subscribers and linked the cotton mills, the railroad, the post office, the drug store, etc. Babington would later invest in industries like cotton and the railroads.

In May 1899, he resigned as a railroad agent and telegraphic operator to move to Gastonia, North Carolina, and begin a telephone business. Starting this time with sixty four subscribers, he expanded his new network into over seven counties and over the border into South Carolina. Babington-Love Interests, his trademark, eventually absorbed the first telephone system of Gaston County built by Henry M. McAden in McAdenville, North Carolina. Shifting away from the engineering aspect which he self-described as tolling "cost[ing] blood sweat", he became the Assistant Treasurer, General Manager, and Director of the Piedmont Telephone and Telegraph Company and as time passed, Vice President and Director of the Armstrong Cotton Mills Company, Director of the Gaston Loan and Trust Company, and Director of the First National Bank. A popular figure, he was also elected Alderman of Gastonia. After a few years, Piedmont Telephone and Telegraph Company was acquired by Southern Bell Telephone and Telegraph Company where he continued to work until June 1933.

Commiserate with being a leading citizen, Babington bought the second automobile in Gastonia in 1904, a Locomobile Steamer, costing $675 (equivalent to $24,187 in 2025) which he frequently toured around the town as pictured in one newspaper clipping in front of the Falls House, where crowds used to await trains. The Falls House of Gastonia would later become the site of Babington's Armington Hotel erected in 1914 and opening August 31, 1915, for $75,000 (equivalent to $2,386,924 in 2025). This building, which was named by combining Babington and his principal partner's last name, Armstrong, was subsequently destroyed in 1959 and today the lot is a railway overpass. Characteristically, every room was to have telephone service. Until then, a far more altruistic project was on his mind, a North Carolina Orthopaedic Hospital.

== Philanthropy ==
Babington read in 1909 about an orphanage that didn't have the financial means to accept a crippled child in its institution. His reaction was immediate: "I made a vow then and there never to rest until North Carolina had some place to foster and care for her other unfortunate and destitute children. I dreamed about it that night; the vision would not pass". The project, presented to the Commercial Travelers Club of Charlotte and chartered on April 9, 1914, was ambitious because it would constitute the first orthopedic hospital south of Philadelphia and local subsidies were rare at the time. He wanted the healthcare to be free, for the latest surgical techniques to be employed, and for the hospital to be a home for crippled children. After Babington studied orthopedics and lobbied the State for most of a decade, the North Carolina General Assembly appropriated $25,000 in 1917 (equivalent to $628,247 in 2025) for the construction of the school provided a portion of the funds could be matched locally. A woman named Lena Rivers was crucial in convincing the Assembly before the vote. Babington brought the local fundraiser to fruition bringing in $10,000 from Gastonia and $5,000 from Charlotte businessmen and opened the North Carolina Orthopaedic Hospital (NCOH) on July 1, 1921, on 26 acres (11 ha) between the two urban zones. The State pledged additional funds ($7,500 per year) for upkeep, Gastonia provided free water and electricity, and local business planned holiday celebrations for the patients. One notable surgeon was Oscar L. Miller and a year after Babington died, a notable visitor was Franklin D. Roosevelt when the institution had 160 beds, all filled. Coincidentally, the hospital heroically responded to the polio epidemic of the 1940s. Early on, NCOH accepted black children and in 1966, the institution was integrated. It was only in 1979, when crippling diseases were rarer, that the services were absorbed by other hospitals, within Duke University, and Wake Forest University.

A few years after opening the hospital, Babington probably exhausted, left for a tour of the world in 1923.

== Family life ==
Babington married the same year his father died, at only 18 years of age on February 22, 1888, Buena Vista Biggerstaff with whom he had children Robert Kenneth, Raymond and John (died in infancy), and Mildred. Widowed by Buena Vista in 1897, he married again, this time to Hattie A. McLurd, and fathered Merle (died in infancy), Mary Love, Robin Benjamin (R.B. Jr.), Isabel Macauley, Harriet Maupin, and Ruth. Kenneth studied electrical engineering and would become a frequent business partner of his father's and later his biographer while R.B. Jr. was called to the insurance business with his uncle Mr. E. G. McLurd. Babington's interest for children is manifested in his 1909 calling to create a school for handicapped children. He also provided the first free park for children in Gastonia. His mother, Margaret Isabelle died in Charlotte in June 1916 after a lifetime of community involvement that manifestly influenced her son. Finally, many member of his family were masons and while he became affiliated with all the Masonic bodies, including Blue Lodge, his grandmother Catherine Sweet Babington (died 1886), had been the only female mason in America, inducted into the Blue Lodge because she had spied on their meetings. Babington died on November 28, 1935, from an illness at age 66 and was buried on his hospital's grounds.
