= Highland Park Manufacturing Company Mill No. 3 =

Historic district in North Carolina, United States

- U.S. National Register of Historic Places
- U.S. Historic district
- U.S. Historic district – Contributing property
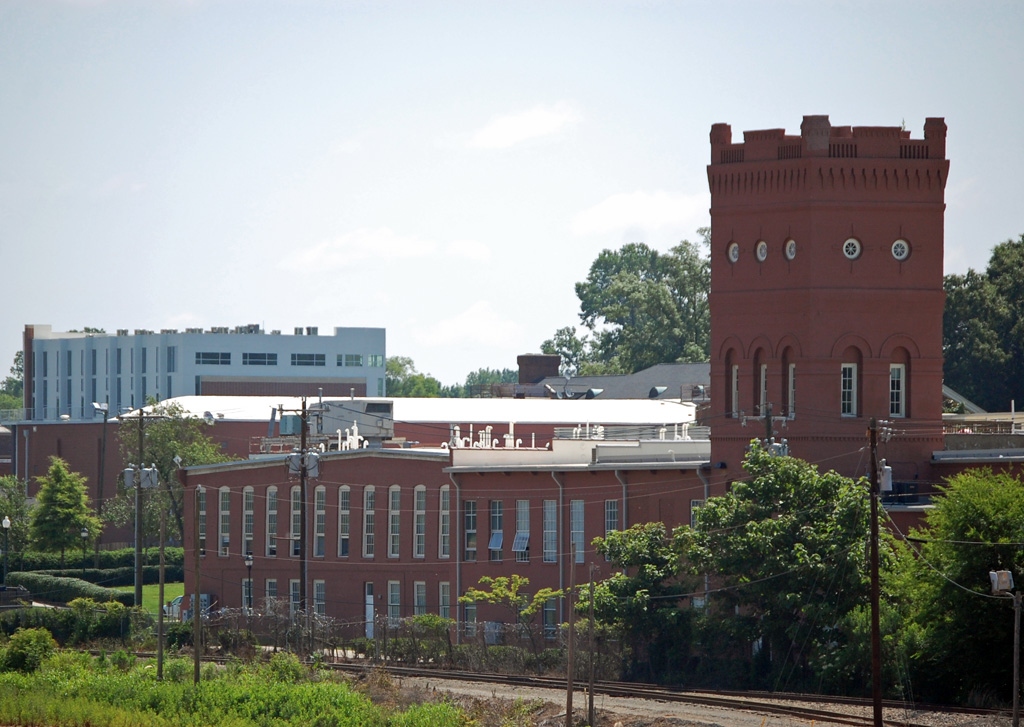
- Highland Park Manufacturing Company Mill No. 3, June 2007

- Location within North Carolina Location within the United States
- Location: 2901 N. Davidson St., Charlotte, North Carolina
- Coordinates: 35.2455°N 80.8097°W
- Area: 9.3 acres (3.8 ha)
- Built: 1903
- Built by: Cramer, Stuart Warren
- Architectural style: Textile mill vernacular
- NRHP reference No.: 88001855
- Added to NRHP: October 20, 1988

The Highland Park Manufacturing Company Mill No. 3 is a historic textile mill complex and national historic district located at 2901 N. Davidson St. in Charlotte, Mecklenburg County, North Carolina. The district encompasses included five contributing buildings and are the original mill building (1903-1904) and major weaving room addition (c. 1946), Gate House (c. 1904, 1920), Dye House (c. 1925), Boiler House (c. 1903-1904), and Waste House (1903-1904). The original mill was designed by Stuart W. Cramer and features a four-story tower capped by fancy corbelling and crenelated parapets.

The building is located in the North Charlotte Historic District. It was listed on the National Register of Historic Places in 1988. Currently, the building had been converted into an apartment complex named Highland Mill Lofts.
