= Rickey Hill (cheerleader) =

American cheerleading and dance coach

- Born: Mount Holly, North Carolina, U.S.
- Died: September 20, 2021; New Orleans, Louisiana, U.S.
- Education: Methodist University
- Occupations: Choreographer; Coach

Rickey Hill (died September 20, 2021) was an American college cheerleading and dance coach and choreographer. He served as the head coach of the Loyola Wolf Pack cheerleading and dance teams at Loyola University New Orleans from 2016 until his death. He previously coached cheerleading and dance at James Madison University, Virginia Tech, the University of Virginia, Methodist University, and Winthrop University.

== Early life and education ==
Hill was from Mount Holly, North Carolina. In 1983, he became the first male cheerleader at East Gaston High School. Hill attended Methodist University from 1986 to 1990, where he was a member of the cheerleading team.

== Career ==
In the 1990s, Hill coached the cheerleading and dance teams at James Madison University. In 1996, the James Madison cheerleading squad won a national championship under Hill's direction.

He later coached cheerleading and dance at Virginia Tech, the University of Virginia, Methodist University, and Winthrop University.

In 2016, he was hired to lead a new cheerleading and dance program at Loyola University New Orleans. He also served as Loyola's representative on the Southern States Athletic Conference's Striving for Equality Place Committee, which served to combat racism and other forms of social injustices and discrimination within the athletic conference. In 2020, he led both the cheerleading and dance teams to the National Association of Intercollegiate Athletics national championship, but the teams ultimately did not compete due to the COVID-19 pandemic in the United States. He went on to lead the teams to several NAIA top-ten finishes.

Hill also worked as a traveling choreographer and competition judge.

== Personal life and death ==
Hill was LGBTQ.

He died of a heart attack on September 20, 2021, at the age of 54, while on campus. A memorial service was held for Hill on October 19, 2021 at the Ignatius Chapel on Loyola's campus.

== Legacy ==
Hill was inducted into the Methodist University Hall of Fame with the 1986 cheerleading team in 2018.
