= South Point High School (North Carolina) =

American public school in North Carolina

Location
- 906 South Point Road; Belmont, North Carolina 28012; United States; 35°13′22″N 81°02′20″W

Information
- Former name: Belmont High School
- Type: Public high school
- Established: 1964
- School district: Gaston County Schools
- NCES School ID: 370162000711
- Principal: Josh Allen
- Teaching staff: 51.64 (on an FTE basis)
- Grades: 9–12
- Enrollment: 983 (2023–2024)
- Student to teacher ratio: 19.04
- Campus size: 28.4 acres (115,000 m^{2})
- Campus type: Suburban
- Colors: Red and black
- Mascot: Red Raider
- Nickname: Red Raiders
- Website: www.gaston.k12.nc.us/spoint

South Point High School (formerly Belmont High School) is a public high school in Belmont, North Carolina, United States. It was established in 1964 and is part of the Gaston County Schools district.

== History ==
South Point High School was completed on South Point Road in 1964 as Belmont High School, replacing a building on North Central Avenue which became Belmont Middle School, and adopted its present name in 1969 after it merged with Cramerton High School and Reid High School. It lost approximately 200 students to Stuart W. Cramer High School in nearby Cramerton (but with a Belmont address), when the latter school opened in 2013.

== Mascot ==
The school's mascot is the Red Raiders. The origins of the mascot are in dispute, being either derived from soldiers who rubbed red clay on their faces during the Battle of Kings Mountain or adopted from the Colgate University mascot, which was formerly named the Red Raider before being recognized as racially insensitive in 2001. In 2015, a letter to the school board from a Native American tribe member complained that the Red Raiders logo promotes racism. In 2020, rival petitions to either remove or retain the mascot circulated.

== Notable alumni ==
- Fortune Feimster, writer, comedian, and actress
- Perry Fewell, football coach
- Mitch Harris, MLB player
- Sammy Johns, singer-songwriter
- Justine Kish, MMA fighter
- Devon Lowery, MLB player
- Nick Muse, NFL tight end, younger brother of Tanner Muse
- Tanner Muse, NFL linebacker, two-time CFP national champion with Clemson
- Koren Robinson, NFL wide receiver and Pro Bowl selection in 2005
- Jeffrey Springs, MLB player
- Hal Stowe, MLB player
