= Downtown Mount Holly Historic District =

Historic district in North Carolina, United States

- U.S. National Register of Historic Places
- U.S. Historic district
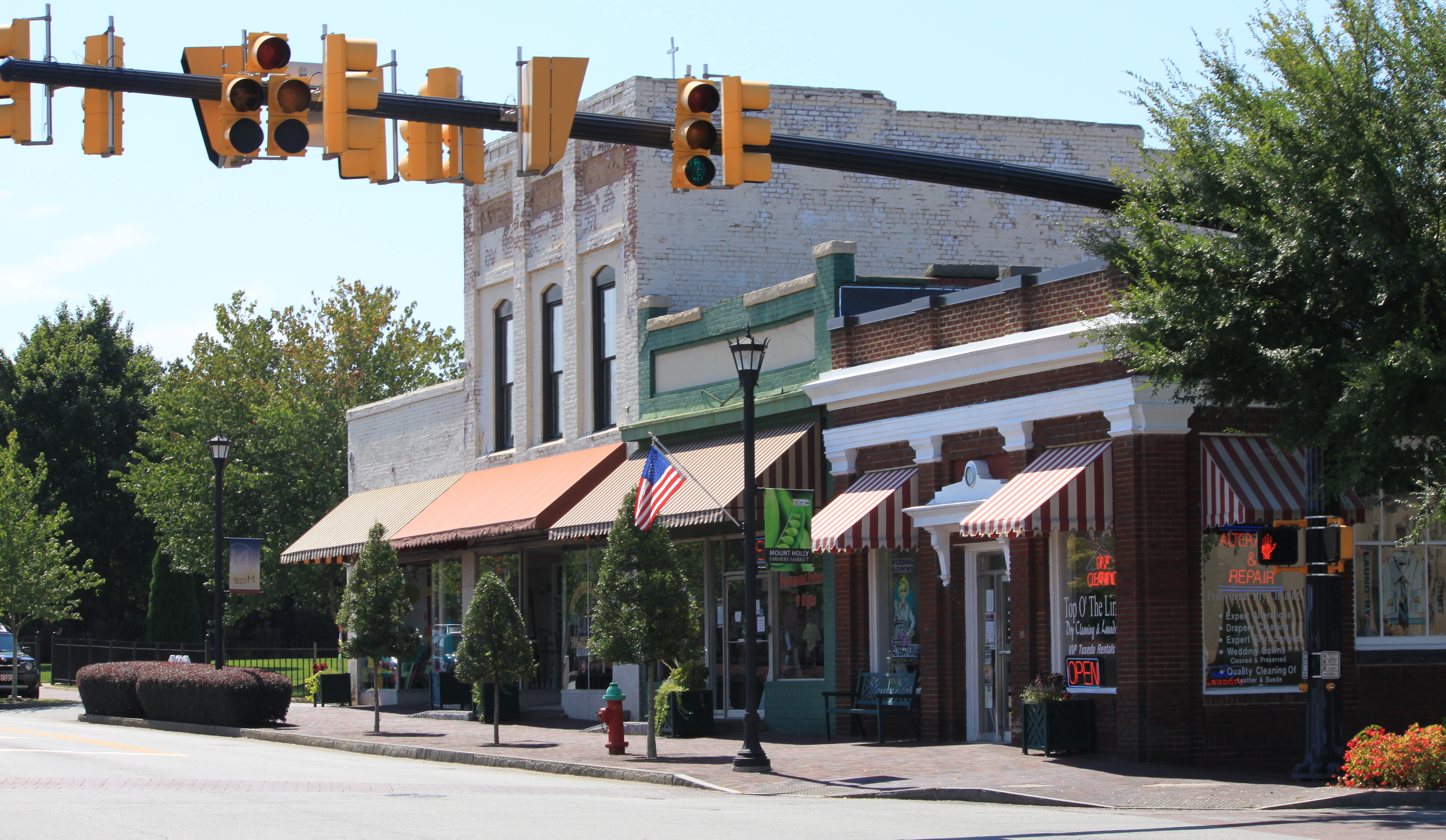
- Downtown Mount Holly Historic District, September 2014

- Location within North Carolina Location within the United States
- Location: 100 blocks of N. & S. Main Sts. & W. Central Ave., Mount Holly, North Carolina
- Coordinates: 35°17′52″N 81°00′58″W
- Area: 85 acres (34 ha)
- Built: 1883
- Built by: Young Construction Company; Rankin, R. F.; Hand, W. H. and Son
- Architectural style: Commercial Style, Modern Movement, Classical Revival
- NRHP reference No.: 12000236
- Added to NRHP: April 24, 2012

Downtown Mount Holly Historic District is a national historic district located at Mount Holly, Gaston County, North Carolina. https://visitmounthollync.com/ It encompasses 25 contributing buildings and 1 contributing structure in the central business district of Mount Holly. The buildings were built between about 1883 and 1960, and characterized by one- and two-story brick commercial buildings. Notable buildings include the Classical Revival style Mount Holly Bank, Evangelical Lutheran Church of the Good Shepherd (1903), First Presbyterian Church (1927), and Charlie's Drugs and Sundries (1960).

It was listed on the National Register of Historic Places in 2012.
