= Mount Holly Cotton Mill =

Historic mill complex in North Carolina, US

- U.S. National Register of Historic Places
- Location within North Carolina Location within the United States
- Location: 250 N. Main St., Mount Holly, North Carolina
- Coordinates: 35°18′2″N 81°0′54″W
- Area: 2.8 acres (1.1 ha)
- Built: 1875, 1916, 1919
- Architectural style: industrial italianate
- NRHP reference No.: 96000830
- Added to NRHP: August 1, 1996

Mount Holly Cotton Mill, also known as Alsace Manufacturing Co., is a historic cotton mill complex located at Mount Holly, Gaston County, North Carolina. The original section was built in 1875, and is a 3 story, rectangular brick mill building with Industrial Italianate detailing. A three-story addition was built in 1916, and a one-story, T-plan brick machine shop and boiler house was added in 1919. The complex was converted into a research unit in 1953, and in 1973 was sold to an independent mill operator who presently uses the building for a variety of industrial and commercial purposes.

It was listed on the National Register of Historic Places in 1996.
