= Stuart W. Cramer =

American architect

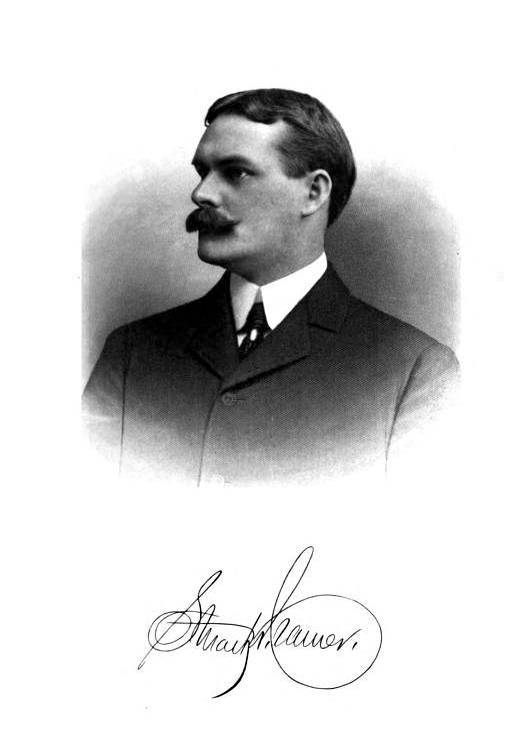
Stuart W. Cramer in 1908

Stuart Warren Cramer (March 31, 1868 – July 2, 1940) was an American engineer, inventor, and contractor, who gained prominence after designing and building nearly 150 cotton mills in the southern United States. He was the founder of Cramerton, North Carolina and became involved in the nascent air conditioning industry, as well as being a founding partner in Duke Power.

== Biography ==
He was born in Thomasville, North Carolina to Mary Jane Thomas Cramer and John Thomas, a furniture manufacturer. He graduated from the United States Naval Academy in 1888 after studying naval engineering. Cramer chose to resign from the Navy to study in the School of Mines at Columbia University in 1888–1889. He found employment with the U.S. Mint in Charlotte, where he worked for four years. After that he worked for Daniel A. Tompkins, an engineer and industrialist, for two years, and then went into business for himself designing and equipping cotton mills in the South.

In a May 1906 speech in Asheville, North Carolina, before the American Cotton Manufacturers Association, Cramer coined the term air conditioning. Cramer's connection to air conditioning originated from his work in the textile industry. Over the course of his career he acquired more than 60 patents for the humidity control and ventilating equipment he developed for cotton mills across the South.

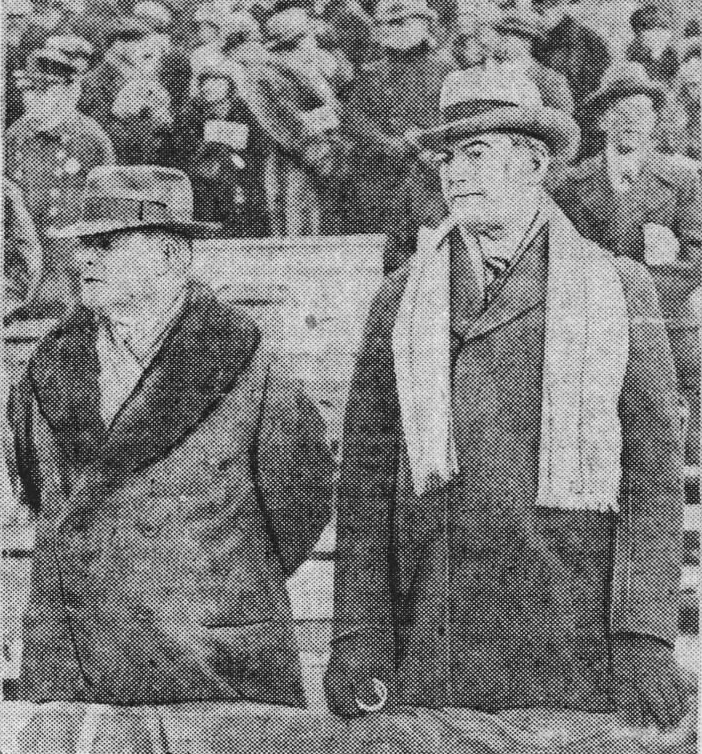
Cramer attending the 1926 Army–Navy Game with Sec. of Navy Curtis D. Wilbur

In the 1920's Cramer conceived of a new textile weave for U.S. military uniforms after consultation with his former Naval Academy classmate, U. S. Secretary of the Navy Curtis Wilbur, and his sons. As a result, "Cramerton Army Cloth" was patented and first produced in 1929.

Cramer was a founding member of the American Cotton Manufacturers Association and the National Council of American Cotton Textile Manufacturers. He died in Charlotte, North Carolina on 4 July 1940, at the age of 72, and was buried in Elmwood Cemetery.

His great-grandson is actor Grant Cramer.

== Recognition and legacy ==
Stuart W. Cramer High School in Cramerton, North Carolina which includes Cramerton in its attendance district, was named for him.

Several of his textile works are listed on the U.S. National Register of Historic Places.

Works include:

- Highland Park Manufacturing Company Mill No. 3, 2901 N. Davidson St., Charlotte, North Carolina (Cramer, Stuart Warren), NRHP-listed
- Mayworth School, 236 Eighth Ave., Cramerton, North Carolina (Cramer, Stuart), NRHP-listed
- One or more works in North Charlotte Historic District, roughly bounded by the Southern Railroad, Herrin St., Spencer St., and Charles Ave., Charlotte, North Carolina (Cramer, Stuart), NRHP-listed
