= Cramerton, North Carolina =

- Town
- Seal
- Motto: "Pride in our Past and Faith in Our Future"
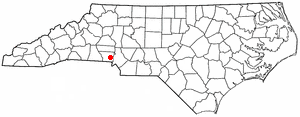
- Location of Cramerton, North Carolina
- Coordinates: 35°13′44″N 81°04′18″W
- Country: United States
- State: North Carolina
- County: Gaston

Government
  - Type: Commissioner-Manager Form of Government
  - Mayor: Nelson Wills
  - Mayor Pro Tempore: Richard Atkinson
  - Commissioners: Dr. Dixie Abernathy, Scott Kincaid, Kathy Ramsey and Jennifer Ramsey

Area
  - Total: 4.94 sq mi (12.80 km^{2})
  - Land: 4.64 sq mi (12.03 km^{2})
  - Water: 0.30 sq mi (0.78 km^{2})
- Elevation: 571 ft (174 m)

Population (2020)
  - Total: 5,296
  - Density: 1,140.6/sq mi (440.38/km^{2})
- Time zone: UTC-5 (Eastern (EST))
  - Summer (DST): UTC-4 (EDT)
- ZIP code: 28032 and a portion of 28012
- Area code: 704
- FIPS code: 37-15260
- GNIS feature ID: 2406332
- Website: cramerton.org

Cramerton is a small town in Gaston County, North Carolina, United States. It is a suburb of Charlotte and located east of Gastonia. As of the 2020 census, Cramerton had a population of 5,296. A well-known feature is the Cramer Mountain gated development, featuring homes around an 18-hole golf course at Cramer Mountain Country Club.

== Geography ==
Cramerton is located at an elevation of 620 feet (189 m). Two topographic high points, Berry Mountain, elevation 922 feet (281 m), and Cramer Mountain, approximate elevation 850 feet (259 m), are located in the southwestern part of town.

According to the United States Census Bureau, the town has a total area of 4.0 square miles (10.3 km^{2}), of which 3.7 square miles (9.5 km^{2}) is land and 0.31 square miles (0.8 km^{2}), or 7.51%, is water.

Cramerton is bisected by the South Fork Catawba River, which makes a sharp S-curve around the center of town. Just southwest of downtown, Duharts Creek flows into the South Fork Catawba. Duharts Creek is formed by the confluence of Armstrong Branch and New Hope Branch on the western edge of town.

Cramerton town limits include a portion of zip code 28012 that encompass the neighborhood of Lakewood and Stuart W. Cramer High School on the eastern shore of the South Fork River.

The town is located seven miles east of Gastonia and 16 miles west of Charlotte.

== History ==
Originally named Mayesworth, the town was founded in 1906 when J.H. Mayes built a spinning mill along the banks of the South Fork of the Catawba River, just east of Gastonia. In 1910, textile engineer and Thomasville native Stuart Warren Cramer became owner and president of the mill and property. He turned the mill and the surrounding community into a model mill village. In 1921, Cramer changed the name of the town to Cramerton, and the name of the mill to Cramerton Mills in 1922. Also in 1921, Cramer built the church buildings for the Cramerton Methodist Church (known originally as Mayworth Methodist Church) and First Baptist Church. In 1923, Cramer built the Mayflower Weave Mill.

Cramer is credited with designing and equipping "about one-third of the new cotton mills in the South" between 1895 and 1915, and simultaneously acquiring extensive holdings in textile mills. Among Cramer's numerous industrial engineering patents was one for the "Cramer System of Air Conditioning", which included the automatic regulation of temperature and humidity. These early innovations in air conditioning resulted more from the need to remove lint from the air (a persistent problem in the textile mills) than to cool the factory atmosphere. The term "air conditioning" is attributed to Cramer.

In 1946 the mills and homes were sold to Burlington Industries, who in turn sold the homes to residents. The Town of Cramerton incorporated in 1967 and began providing municipal services.

In 1997, a luxury home on Cramer Mountain was briefly the residence Steven Eugene Chambers, a participant in the October 1997 Loomis Fargo robbery. The Mayworth School was listed on the National Register of Historic Places in 2002.

== Demographics ==
Historical population
Census	Pop.	Note	%±
1950	3,211		—
1960	3,123		−2.7%
1970	2,142		−31.4%
1980	1,869		−12.7%
1990	2,371		26.9%
2000	2,976		25.5%
2010	4,165		40.0%
2020	5,296		27.2%
2025 (est.)	5,713	▲	7.9%
U.S. Decennial Census

=== 2020 census ===
Cramerton racial composition
Race	Number	Percentage
White (non-Hispanic)	4,213	79.55%
Black or African American (non-Hispanic)	465	8.78%
Native American	20	0.38%
Asian	160	3.02%
Pacific Islander	1	0.02%
Other/Mixed	216	4.08%
Hispanic or Latino	221	4.17%

As of the 2020 census, Cramerton had a population of 5,296. The median age was 41.3 years. 20.1% of residents were under the age of 18 and 15.9% of residents were 65 years of age or older. For every 100 females there were 90.0 males, and for every 100 females age 18 and over there were 87.6 males age 18 and over.

100.0% of residents lived in urban areas, while 0.0% lived in rural areas.

There were 2,263 households in Cramerton, of which 28.8% had children under the age of 18 living in them. There were 1,165 families residing in the town. Of all households, 49.2% were married-couple households, 15.8% were households with a male householder and no spouse or partner present, and 28.9% were households with a female householder and no spouse or partner present. About 29.1% of all households were made up of individuals and 9.1% had someone living alone who was 65 years of age or older.

There were 2,506 housing units, of which 9.7% were vacant. The homeowner vacancy rate was 3.3% and the rental vacancy rate was 12.2%.

=== 2000 census ===
As of the census of 2000, there were 2,976 people, 1,169 households, and 859 families residing in the town. The population density was 830.5 inhabitants per square mile (320.7/km^{2}). There were 1,229 housing units at an average density of 343.0 per square mile (132.4/km^{2}). The racial makeup of the town was 94.12% White, 2.35% African American, 0.50% Native American, 1.92% Asian, 0.20% from other races, and 0.91% from two or more races. Hispanic or Latino of any race were 0.37% of the population.

There were 1,169 households, out of which 35.4% had children under the age of 18 living with them, 60.7% were married couples living together, 9.8% had a female householder with no husband present, and 26.5% were non-families. 22.2% of all households were made up of individuals, and 10.0% had someone living alone who was 65 years of age or older. The average household size was 2.54 and the average family size was 2.97.

In the town, the population was spread out, with 25.9% under the age of 18, 5.8% from 18 to 24, 31.7% from 25 to 44, 25.1% from 45 to 64, and 11.5% who were 65 years of age or older. The median age was 37 years. For every 100 females, there were 91.6 males. For every 100 females age 18 and over, there were 88.1 males.

The median income for a household in the town was $47,610, and the median income for a family was $56,071. Males had a median income of $37,679 versus $27,330 for females. The per capita income for the town was $25,503. About 3.3% of families and 4.9% of the population were below the poverty line, including 4.2% of those under age 18 and 10.9% of those age 65 or over.

== Government ==
Cramerton operates under the council-manager form of government with a mayor and a five-member town board and a town manager. In 2011, after 50 years of service, the town ended its contract with the Cramerton Volunteer Fire Department. The town then worked to create a new town-managed department that provides fire protection for Cramerton as well as neighboring McAdenville. The new Town of Cramerton Fire Department has been in place since 2012.

Cramerton operates its own police department. Based on a contract signed in 2006 by both the McAdenville and Cramerton town councils, officers of the Cramerton Police Department also handle patrol duties within the McAdenville town limits between the hours of 6 PM and 6 AM daily. Cramerton police also assist McAdenville officers with felony criminal investigations.

Cramerton is in South Point Township.

== Business and industry ==
The textile industry has long been central to Cramerton's economy, but globalization has caused many of the local plants to close and devastated the local economy. Burlington Industries, which had operated the former Cramerton Mills, went bankrupt in 2001. Employers like Eagle Mountain Finishers and Lakewood Dyed Yarns (both subsidiaries of Joan Fabrics Corp.) were closed in 2006 and 2007. Textile companies Brookline Inc. and Wagner Knitting, Inc., have also been affected by the economic downturn. Syncot Fibers and Plastics, Inc., operates a facility in Cramerton specializing in the recycling of nylon.

In the twenty-first century, like many nearby communities affected by the exit of many businesses in the textile industry, the town has seen some significant growth and revitalization in the years following the aftermath of the 2008 financial crisis. As a suburb of the greater Gaston and Charlotte area, the town is within commuting distance for workers of businesses within other industries, such as financial and banking services, technology, travel and tourism, and retail.

Within Cramerton, especially in the Downtown district, there are a number of companies operating within the restaurant, coffee shop, retail, and recreational-related industries. The downtown area includes Cramerton's Centennial Park (which includes the Veteran's Memorial) and Goat Island Park (which is accessible by two foot bridges); these attractions are intended to bring visitors to the area that support the local businesses.

The Gaston Business Association and Montcross Area Chamber of Commerce are the major commerce associations of businesses representing Cramerton and other communities.

== Transportation ==
The primary east–west highway passing through Cramerton is U.S. Route 29/U.S. Route 74 (Wilkinson Boulevard). North Carolina Highway 279 (New Hope Road) forms Cramerton's southwest border.

Freight rail service is provided by the Norfolk Southern Railway. While Amtrak's passenger train also follows the Norfolk Southern main line, the nearest station is in Charlotte. The Gastonia station is closed.

Charlotte Area Transit System's (CATS) Gastonia Express (Route 85X) offers Monday thru Friday express bus service to/from uptown Charlotte, via the Abbey Plaza Shopping Center Station in Belmont, about 3 miles (5 km) east of Cramerton.

The nearest airport is Charlotte/Douglas International Airport in Mecklenburg County, about 9.5 miles (15.3 km) east of Cramerton.

Cramerton has the shortest known "Main Street" in the United States and the world, which is approximately 100-feet long. This is due to having a longer North and South Main Street which parallel the Norfolk Southern railroad tracks.

== Education ==
Public education in Cramerton is administered by the Gaston County Schools public school system.

Elementary school-age children in Cramerton attend either New Hope Elementary School (south of Cramerton in unincorporated South Point Township), J.B. Page Elementary School (pre-K to grade 1) or Belmont Central Elementary School (grades 2–5) in Belmont, McAdenville Elementary School in McAdenville, or Gardner Park Elementary School in Gastonia.

Most middle school students attend Cramerton Middle School. Portions of the town are zoned to Holbrook Middle School in Lowell or Belmont Middle School in Belmont.

Current high school-age students attend Stuart W. Cramer High School. While the school is located in Cramerton, it has a Belmont mailing address because it is in zip code 28012, which is split between Cramerton and Belmont.

Private schools in Cramerton include Cramerton Christian Academy, with programs for Pre-K through Grade 12. It is operated by Cramerton Freewill Baptist Church.

== Recreation ==
The town has a history of golfing as a recreational activity, which was supported by the town's founder Stuart W. Cramer. Historically, the town has had three golfing courses, with the fourth golfing course being built by Cramer on Cramer Mountain. The Cramer Mountain golf course is still in active operation, and is operated by the private member club "Cramer Mountain Club". The Cramer Mountain golf course was designed by renown golfing course architect Dan Maples, a member of the American Society of Golf Course Architects.

Since the town is situated along the South Fork Catawba River, it also has an active recreational culture of waterspouts, such as kayaking and canoeing. The Goat Island Park in Cramerton also features an 18-hole Disc Golf course.

== Points of interest ==
- Mayworth School at 236 Eighth Avenue in Cramerton is listed on the National Register of Historic Places.
- First Baptist Church at 235 Eighth Avenue in Cramerton was used as a location for filming operations and two scenes in the 2004 Will Ferrell movie Talladega Nights: The Ballad of Ricky Bobby.

== Notable people ==
- Stuart W. Cramer (1868–1940), American engineer, inventor, and contractor; founder of Cramerton
- Perry Fewell (born 1962), NFL coach
- Justine Kish (born 1988), MMA fighter
- Rube Melton (1917–1971), MLB pitcher
- George Tinkham (1870–1956), longtime Congressman known as "the conscience of the House"; resided in Cramerton
