= Franklinton Middle School (North Carolina) =

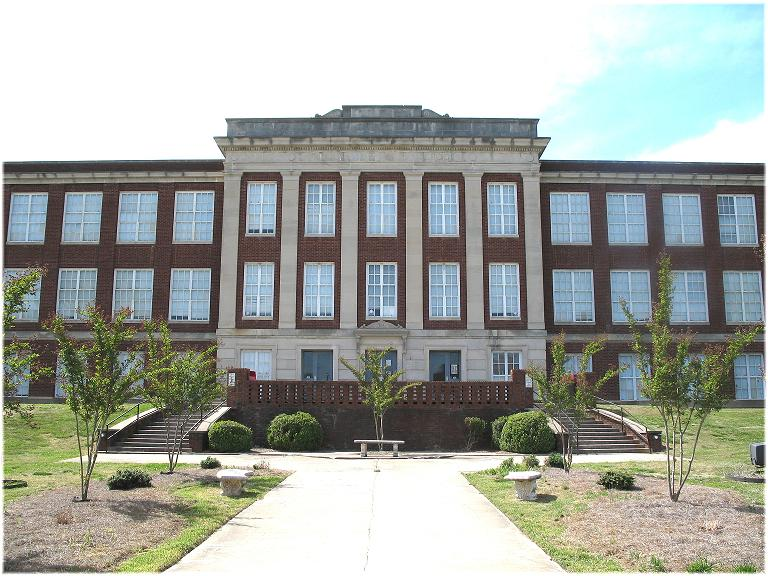

Location
- 3 North Main Street; Franklinton, North Carolina 27525; United States; 36.1043163°N 78.4574988°W

Information
- School type: Public, Middle School
- Motto: "Tradition and Progress"
- Established: 1907 (as all-graded school)
- School board: Franklin County Schools
- School district: Franklin County School District
- Principal: Heidi Boardman (2020-present)
- Teaching staff: 19.40 (FTE)
- Grades: 6 to 8
- Enrollment: 227 (2023-2024)
- Student to teacher ratio: 11.70
- Campus: Rural
- Colors: Red and white
- Mascot: Junior Red Rams
- Website: fms.fcschools.net

Franklinton Middle School is a public school for secondary education located in Franklinton, North Carolina, United States. It occupies the same building as did Franklinton High School from 1924 though 2011 before a new high school building was constructed outside of town in order to ease overcrowding. This school currently serves grades 6 through 8 for students residing in the Franklinton area. The building was closed for renovations from late 2011 through much of 2013. Middle school students attended Cedar Creek Middle School in nearby Youngsville during that time. It reopened as Franklinton Middle School for classes on August 26, 2013.

There are specialty buildings, including the science and music wings, located directly behind the main building. The gymnasium and sports fields are at a separate location just off the northwest corner of Vine and North Cheatham streets within short walking distance from the school.

== History ==
Franklinton Public School was built in 1923 to house all grade levels, replacing the much smaller and inadequate Franklinton Graded School on the north end of town which was only 17 years old at the time. It was a gift to the Town of Franklinton from Samuel C. Vann, founder and original owner of the historic Sterling Cotton Mill which is also located in Franklinton. Franklinton Public School first opened to students on September 11, 1924. The main building is three stories. When built, the first floor was originally used as the elementary school, the second was the middle school, and the third was used as the high school. The lower grades were moved to the former B.F. Person-Albion High School in 1969, now Franklinton Elementary School, when schools were fully integrated. It previously provided education for African-American students. Franklinton Public School was renamed Franklinton High School.

== Demographics ==
Student Demographics: 227 Students Enrolled (2023-2024)

- 41% Black, 23% White, 22% Hispanic, 11% Two or More Races, 2% Asian, 1% Native Hawaiian/Pacific Islander

== 1999 fire ==
Fire broke out at the school during the night of August 26, 1999, causing significant damage to three rooms on the first floor including a guidance office. The building was closed to students for four days while debris cleanup was taking place. These rooms involved were remodeled over the summer before the start of the school year. It is believed that an electrical problem may have started the fire.

== See also ==
- Franklin County Schools
