= Shuqualak, Mississippi =

- Town
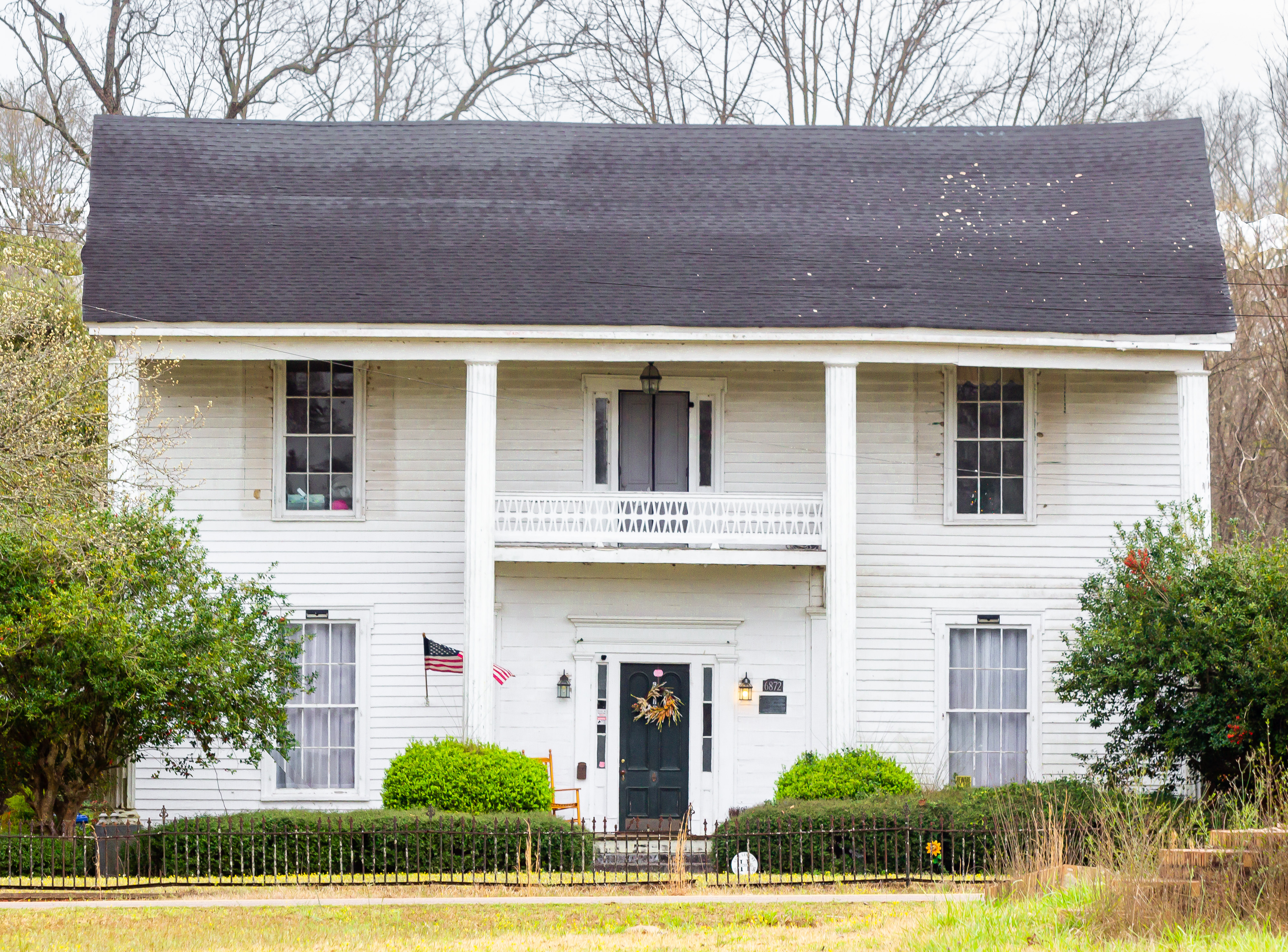
- Flora House in Shuqualak is on the National Register of Historic Places listings in Noxubee County, Mississippi.
- Nickname: Shuga Town
- Motto: This will always be our home
- Location of Shuqualak, Mississippi

- Location in the United States
- Coordinates: 32°58′49″N 88°34′8″W
- Country: United States
- State: Mississippi
- County: Noxubee

Area
  - Total: 1.13 sq mi (2.92 km^{2})
  - Land: 1.13 sq mi (2.92 km^{2})
  - Water: 0 sq mi (0.00 km^{2})
- Elevation: 213 ft (65 m)

Population (2020)
  - Total: 399
  - Density: 353.5/sq mi (136.49/km^{2})
- Time zone: UTC-6 (Central (CST))
  - Summer (DST): UTC-5 (CDT)
- ZIP code: 39361
- Area code: 662
- FIPS code: 28-67640
- GNIS feature ID: 0677762
- Website: www.townofshuqualak.com

Shuqualak (/ˈʃʊɡəlɑːk/ SHUU-gə-lock) is a town in Noxubee County, Mississippi, United States. As of the 2020 census, the population was 399. That is down from 501 from the 2010 census. Three locations in Shuqualak, including most of the downtown area, are included on the National Register of Historic Places.

== History ==
Shaqualak was settled after the Treaty of Dancing Rabbit Creek was signed in 1830. Shuqualak is a name derived from the Choctaw language purported to mean 'beads'.

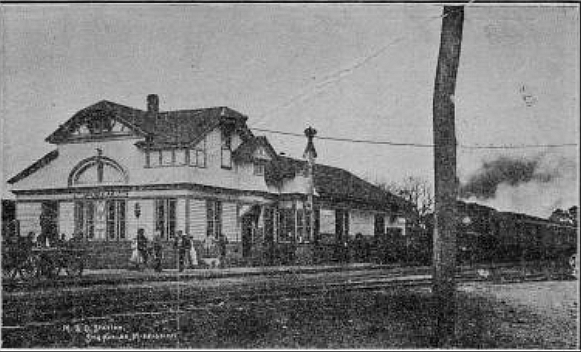
Mobile and Ohio Railroad Station, Shuqualak, Mississippi, circa 1900

By August 1856, the Mobile and Ohio Railroad had built a line through Shuqualak. A post office was established in 1855, presumably alongside the construction of the train station.

There was a devastating fire in 1885 that burned much of downtown.

== Geography ==
Shuqualak is located on U.S. Route 45, midway between Columbus and Meridian.

An auxiliary landing field for Columbus Air Force Base is located south of the town. The name of the auxiliary landing field is Gunshy.

== Demographics ==
Historical population
Census	Pop.	Note	%±
1880	352		—
1890	601		70.7%
1900	600		−0.2%
1910	636		6.0%
1920	764		20.1%
1930	810		6.0%
1940	743		−8.3%
1950	714		−3.9%
1960	550		−23.0%
1970	591		7.5%
1980	554		−6.3%
1990	570		2.9%
2000	562		−1.4%
2010	501		−10.9%
2020	399		−20.4%
U.S. Decennial Census

=== Racial and ethnic composition ===
Shuqualak town, Mississippi – Racial and ethnic composition Note: the US Census treats Hispanic/Latino as an ethnic category. This table excludes Latinos from the racial categories and assigns them to a separate category. Hispanics/Latinos may be of any race.
Race / Ethnicity (NH = Non-Hispanic)	Pop 2000	Pop 2010	Pop 2020	% 2000	% 2010	% 2020
White alone (NH)	167	100	40	29.72%	19.96%	10.03%
Black or African American alone (NH)	391	392	338	69.57%	78.24%	84.71%
Native American or Alaska Native alone (NH)	0	0	0	0.00%	0.00%	0.00%
Asian alone (NH)	0	1	0	0.00%	0.20%	0.00%
Native Hawaiian or Pacific Islander alone (NH)	0	0	0	0.00%	0.00%	0.00%
Other race alone (NH)	0	0	0	0.00%	0.00%	0.00%
Mixed race or Multiracial (NH)	4	2	16	0.71%	0.40%	4.01%
Hispanic or Latino (any race)	0	6	5	0.00%	1.20%	1.25%
Total	562	501	399	100.00%	100.00%	100.00%

=== 2020 census ===
As of the 2020 United States census, there were 399 people, 199 households, and 115 families residing in the town.

=== 2000 census ===
As of the census of 2000, there were 562 people, 214 households, and 148 families residing in the town. The population density was 493.0 inhabitants per square mile (190.3/km^{2}). There were 249 housing units at an average density of 218.4 per square mile (84.3/km^{2}). The racial makeup of the town was 29.72% White, 69.57% African American, and 0.71% from two or more races.

There were 214 households, out of which 36.0% had children under the age of 18 living with them, 38.3% were married couples living together, 28.0% had a female householder with no husband present, and 30.8% were non-families. 30.4% of all households were made up of individuals, and 12.1% had someone living alone who was 65 years of age or older. The average household size was 2.63 and the average family size was 3.32.

In the town, the population was spread out, with 33.1% under the age of 18, 10.5% from 18 to 24, 24.9% from 25 to 44, 19.6% from 45 to 64, and 11.9% who were 65 years of age or older. The median age was 31 years. For every 100 females, there were 89.2 males. For every 100 females age 18 and over, there were 74.9 males.

The median income for a household in the town was $21,875, and the median income for a family was $26,607. Males had a median income of $28,750 versus $22,596 for females. The per capita income for the town was $12,051. About 30.7% of families and 29.2% of the population were below the poverty line, including 28.1% of those under age 18 and 16.7% of those age 65 or over.

== Economy ==
The Shuqualak Lumber Company was founded in 1948 and employs approximately 150. It is one of the largest privately owned, independent producers of southern yellow pine in the southeastern United States.

== Government ==
=== Municipal government ===
Shuqualak operates under the Code charter form of government, with a mayor and Board of Aldermen. The mayor and aldermen are all elected at-large.

Shuqualak's current mayor is Velma Jenkins of the Democratic Party, who was elected on June 3, 2025. The next election will be in June, 2029. The city clerk is Sonya Slaughter.

=== State government ===
Shuqualak is located in state Senate district 32, represented by Rod Hickman since 2021, and state House district 42, represented by Carl Mickens since 2015; both are members of the Democratic Party. Senator Hickman is Chairman of the State Senate Committee on Housing, and Vice-Chairman of the Committee on Government Structure. Representative Mickens is Chairman of the House Committee on Housing.

=== Federal representation ===
Shuqualak is located in Mississippi's 3rd congressional district. U.S. Representative Michael Guest, a Republican, has served since 2019. He has been Chairman of the Committee on Ethics since 2023, and Chairman of the House Homeland Security Committee's Subcommittee on Border Security and Enforcement since 2025.

The United States Postal Service operates the Shuqualak Post Office.

== Education ==
The Town of Shuqualak is served by the Noxubee County School District. It was the site of Stone Female College and the now defunct Shuqualak Female College, a female seminary founded in 1880.

== Notable people ==
- Vincent Dancy – American football coach
- James Z. George – Confederate politician and military officer

== See also ==
- National Register of Historic Places listings in Noxubee County, Mississippi
