= McGhee House =

McGhee House may refer to:

- Orsel and Minnie McGhee House, Detroit, Michigan, listed on the National Register of Historic Places (NRHP) in Detroit
- C.L. and Bessie G. McGhee House, Franklinton, North Carolina, NRHP-listed
- Person-McGhee Farm, Franklinton, North Carolina, NRHP-listed

== See also ==
- McGee House (disambiguation)
- McGehee House (disambiguation)
