= Louisburg High School =

Louisburg High School may refer to:

- Louisburg High School (Kansas)
- Louisburg High School (North Carolina), part of the Franklin Count Schools school district
