= Franklinton High School =

Franklinton High School may refer to:

- Franklinton High School (Louisiana)
- Franklinton High School (North Carolina)
