= Macon Historic District =

Macon Historic District may refer to:

- Macon Historic District (Macon, Georgia), listed on the National Register of Historic Places in Bibb County, Georgia
- Macon Historic District (Macon, Mississippi), listed on the National Register of Historic Places in Noxubee County, Mississippi
