= McGehee House =

McGehee House may refer to:

== United States ==
- McGehee-Stringfellow House, Greensboro, Alabama, listed on the National Register of Historic Places in Hale County, Alabama
- McGehee-Woodall House, Columbus, Georgia, listed on the National Register of Historic Places in Muscogee County, Georgia
- McGehee House (Hammond, Louisiana), listed on the National Register of Historic Places in Tangipahoa Parish, Louisiana
- McGehee House (Liberty, Mississippi), listed on the National Register of Historic Places in Amite County, Mississippi
- McGeehee-Ames House, Macon, Mississippi, listed on the National Register of Historic Places in Noxubee County, Mississippi
- McGehee Plantation, Senatobia, Mississippi, listed on the National Register of Historic Places in Tate County, Mississippi
- Theodore L. McGehee Plantation House, Summit, Mississippi, listed on the National Register of Historic Places in Amite County, Mississippi
- McGehee House (Vicksburg, Mississippi), listed on the National Register of Historic Places in Warren County, Mississippi

== See also ==
- McGee House (disambiguation)
- McGhee House (disambiguation)
