= McGee House =

McGee House may refer to:

== United States ==
(by state, then city/town)

- James and Mary McGee House, Florence, Arizona, listed on the NRHP in Pinal County, Arizona
- John McGee House, Cornishville, Kentucky, listed on the NRHP in Mercer County, Kentucky
- McGee House (Harrodsburg, Kentucky), listed on the National Register of Historic Places (NRHP) in Mercer County, Kentucky
- McNeill-McGee House, Lake Bounds, Mississippi, listed on the NRHP in Clarke County, Mississippi
- McGee House (Kalispell, Montana), listed on the NRHP in Flathead County, Montana
- McGee House (Aztec, New Mexico), listed on the NRHP in San Juan County, New Mexico
- Wallace-McGee House, Columbia, South Carolina, NRHP-listed
- Turner-White-McGee House, Roganville, Texas, listed on the NRHP in Jasper County, Texas

== See also ==
- McGhee House (disambiguation)
- McGehee House (disambiguation)
