= Aldridge H. Vann House =

Historic house in North Carolina, United States

- U.S. National Register of Historic Places
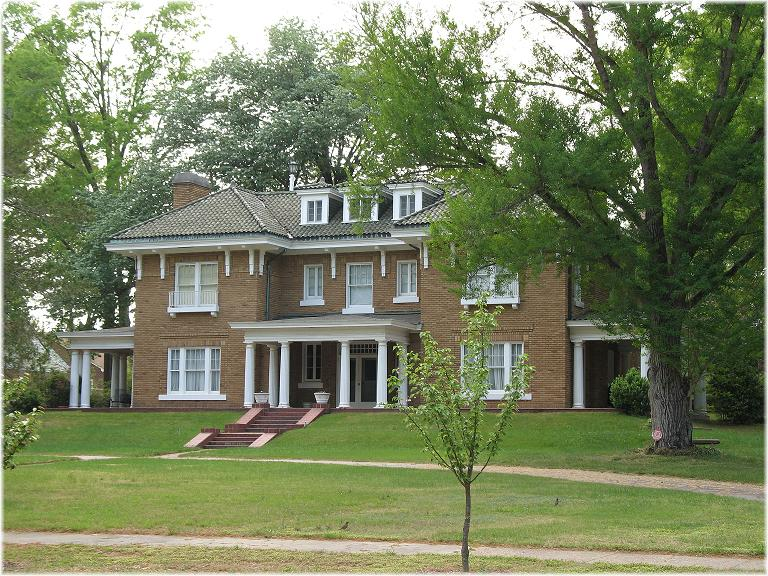
- The historic Aldridge H. Vann House located in Franklinton, North Carolina.

- Location within North Carolina Location within the United States
- Location: 115 N Main St., Franklinton, North Carolina
- Coordinates: 36°6′20″N 78°27′23″W
- Area: 1.3 acres (0.53 ha)
- Built: 1917-1918
- Architect: Salter, James A.
- Architectural style: Classical Revival
- NRHP reference No.: 07001373
- Added to NRHP: January 9, 2008

Aldridge H. Vann House is a historic home located at 115 North Main Street in Franklinton, Franklin County, North Carolina. It was built in 1917–1918, and is a two-story, 6,000 square foot asymmetrical H-shaped Classical Revival style poured concrete dwelling faced with tan brick. The house features a green, Spanish tile roof and a central entry portico. It was built by Aldridge H. Vann, son of Samuel C. Vann, founder of the local Sterling Cotton Mill. The grounds were designed by the nursery firm of Thomas Meehan & Sons, Inc. of Philadelphia.

It was listed on the National Register of Historic Places in 2008.
