= Dr. J. A. Savage House =

Historic house in North Carolina, United States

- U.S. National Register of Historic Places
- Location within North Carolina Location within the United States
- Location: 124 College St., Franklinton, North Carolina
- Coordinates: 36°5′56″N 78°27′27″W
- Area: 1.2 acres (0.49 ha)
- Built: c. 1880, c. 1895
- NRHP reference No.: 80002834
- Added to NRHP: September 22, 1980

Dr. J. A. Savage House, also known as Albion Academy, was a historic home located at 124 East College Street in Franklinton, Franklin County, North Carolina. It was built about 1880, and enlarged to its present size about 1895. It was a two-story, frame house with a cross-gable roof, sheathed with plain weatherboards, and rests on a brick and stone pier foundation. It had a one-story rear kitchen ell. It was originally built as a classroom and/or dormitory, and enlarged by Dr. John A. Savage for use as his private residence. The building housed Albion Academy (1880-1933), a school for African-American elementary and high school students founded by the Presbyterian Board of Missions for Freedmen.

It was listed on the National Register of Historic Places in 1980. Due to the continued deterioration of the building, it was demolished in 1997. The lot is currently vacant.

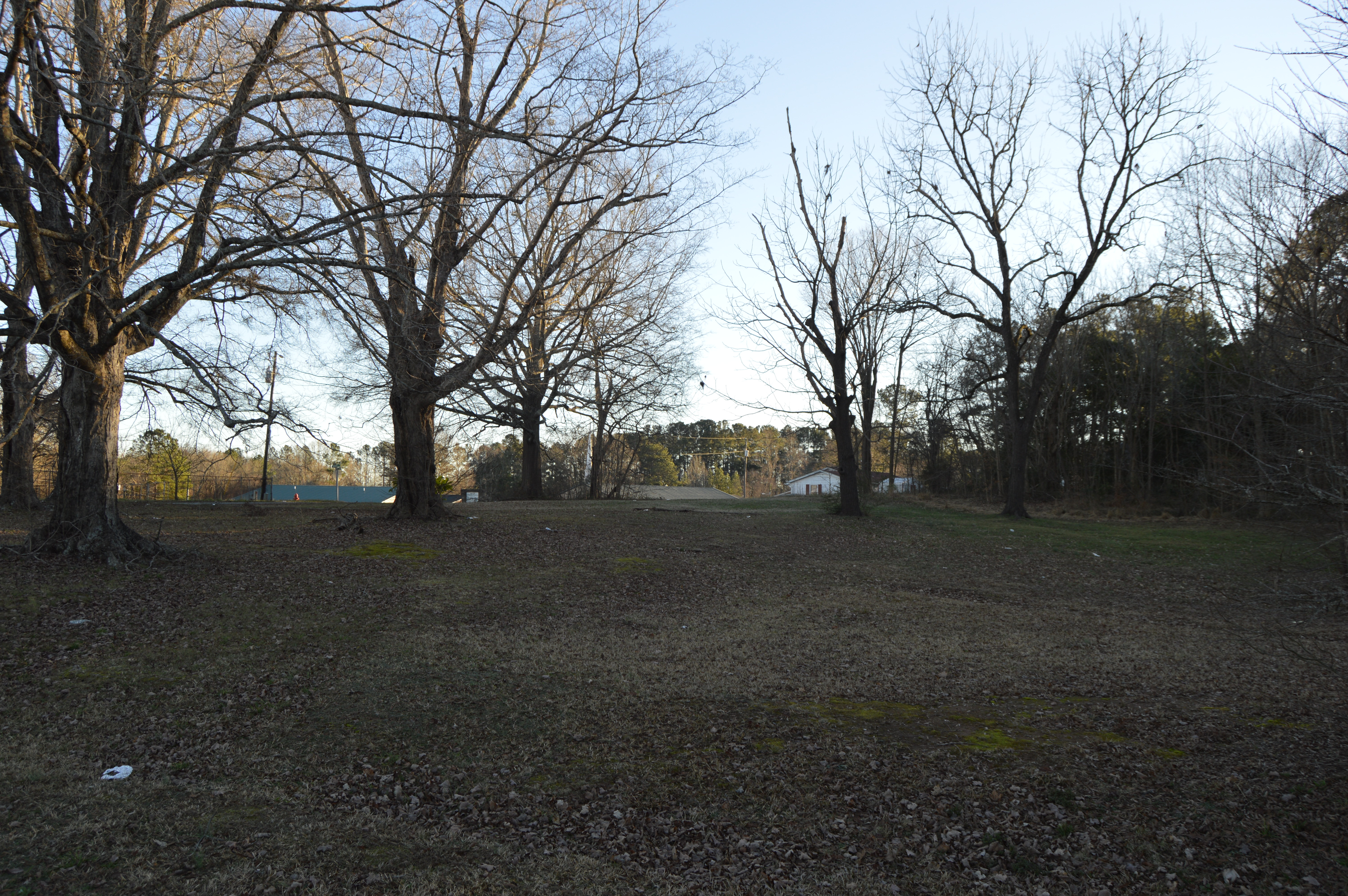
Site of the former house, in 2019
