= Abby House =

American public figure (c. 1796–1881)

Abby House (c. 1796 − November 23, 1881), known as "Aunt Abby," was a public figure in North Carolina during the American Civil War and Reconstruction.

== Early life ==
Abby House was the daughter of Green and Ann House, and lived most of her early life in Franklinton, North Carolina. She did not know the year of her own birth, but remembered that as a young woman, she had a sweetheart who died in the War of 1812, which probably places her birth in the 1790s. She had a reputation for litigiousness in her home county, before the Civil War.

== During the Civil War ==
House, unmarried, illiterate, and in her sixties at the time of the American Civil War, nonetheless promised to look after eight nephews who were serving in the Confederate Army. She traveled to battlefields in Virginia on her own, with her cane and pipe, bringing supplies, providing nursing care and patient advocacy for wounded men. Through her work she came to know General Robert E. Lee, Confederacy president Jefferson Davis, and North Carolina governor Zebulon Baird Vance. The last of these called her "ubiquitous, indefatigable, and inevitable."

== After the Civil War ==
House remained active in public life in North Carolina after the war ended, as a "first class nuisance," in one newspaper's description. In 1876, she attended a Democratic Convention in Raleigh, and may have been allowed to vote for Zebulon Vance as a candidate for governor. In this act, she may have been the first woman to vote in North Carolina. She was welcomed onto the platform for Vance's inauguration the following year. One news report noted, with some humorous exaggeration, that "it was with the greatest difficulty that she could be kept from riding in the Governor's lap during the procession."

House was known for her proficient swearing. She became a member of the Methodist church for the first time in about 1875. She made a significant cash gift to the building of a Methodist church in Raleigh. She lived her last years in a cottage, bought for her by Confederate veterans in recognition of her service on their behalf. She was unsuccessful in her efforts to gain a pension for her wartime contributions, but she met with novelist E. D. E. N. Southworth during her 1879 visit to Washington D. C.

She died in late 1881, in her eighties. An acquaintance remarked many years later, "until she died in 1881, there were few women in North Carolina better known."
