= Dr. J. H. Harris House =

Historic house in North Carolina, United States

- U.S. National Register of Historic Places
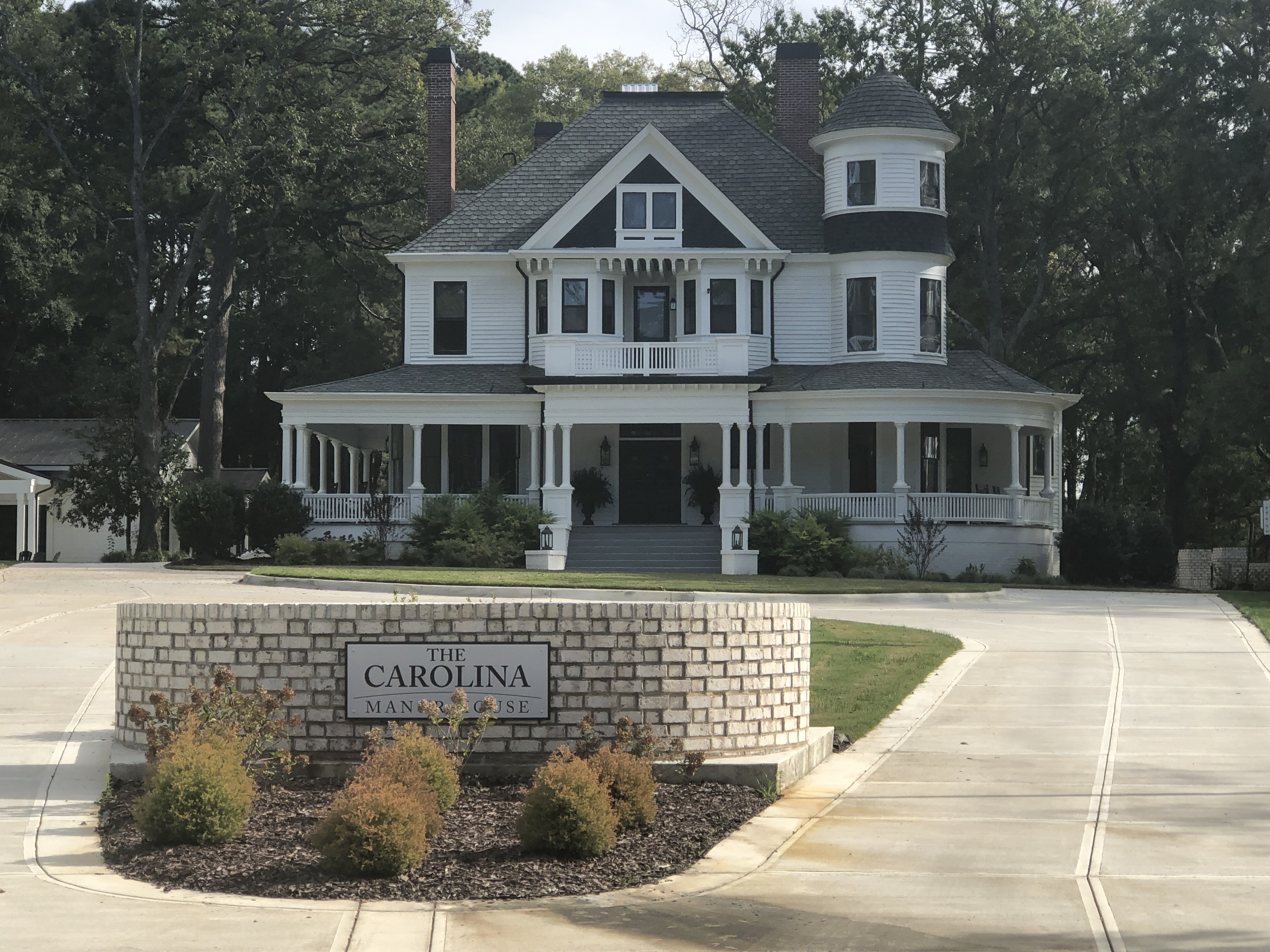
- The Carolina Manor House in Franklinton, North Carolina, also called the Dr. J.H. Harris House. On the far left side of the image (in the background) is the Grand Hall building.

- Location within North Carolina Location within the United States
- Location: 312 E. Mason St., Franklinton, North Carolina
- Coordinates: 36°6′15″N 78°27′4″W
- Area: 6 acres (2.4 ha)
- Built: 1902-1904
- Built by: J.H. Whitfield
- Architectural style: Queen Anne
- NRHP reference No.: 75001260
- Added to NRHP: August 1, 1975

Dr. J. H. Harris House is a historic home located at 312 East Mason Street in Franklinton, Franklin County, North Carolina. It was built between 1902 and 1904, and is a two-story, rectangular Queen Anne style frame dwelling. It features a tall, steep deck-and-hip roof; projecting bays, gables, dormers, and towers; and a one-story wraparound porch.

It was listed on the National Register of Historic Places in 1975. Previously known as The Mason Street Manor, the home is now under new ownership and called The Carolina Manor House. It is still a special events venue, re-opening in October 2023 after recent renovations.
