= Dancing Rabbit Creek Treaty Site =

Historic Native American gathering place

- U.S. National Register of Historic Places
- U.S. National Historic Landmark
- Mississippi Landmark
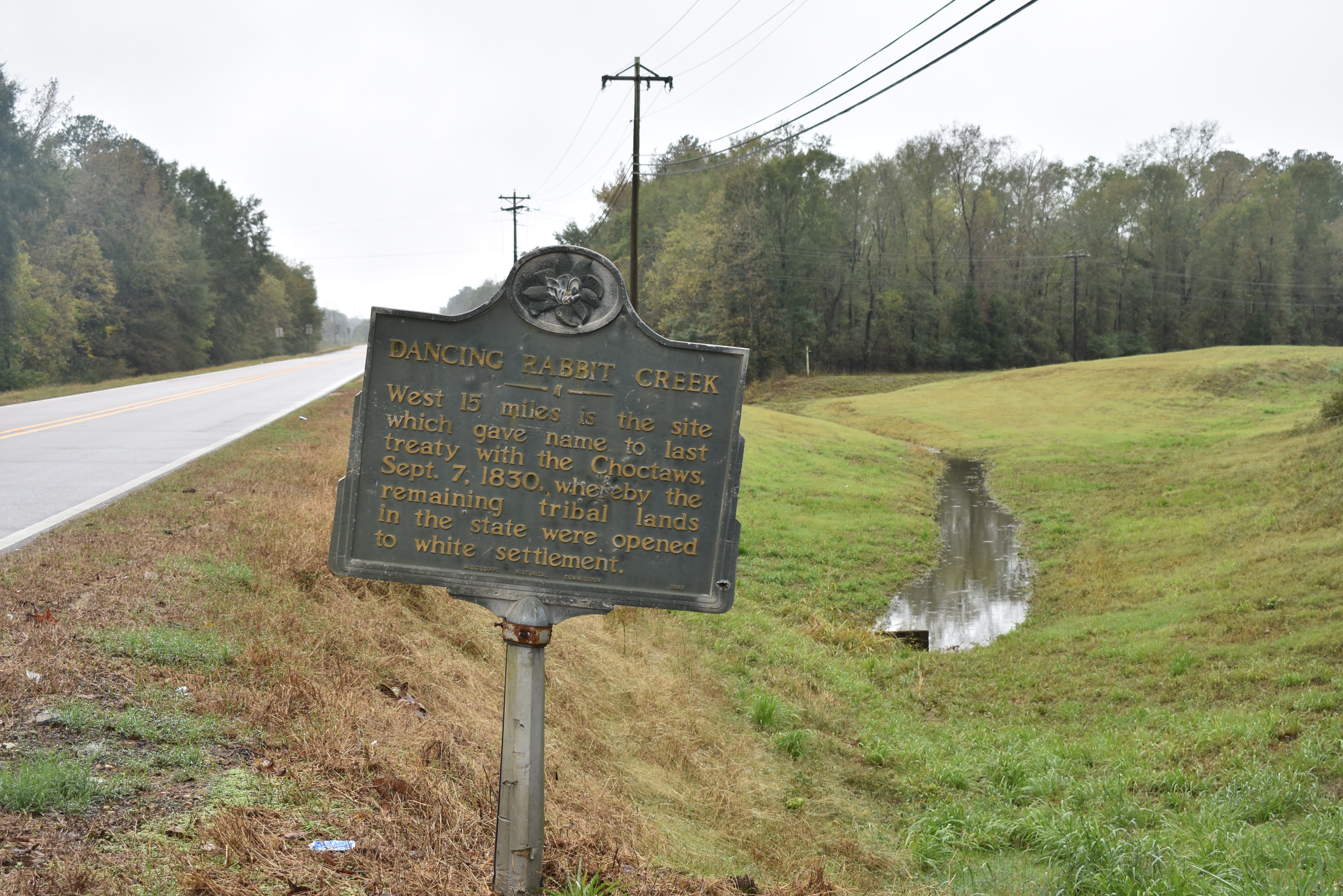
- Historic marker for the Treaty of Dancing Rabbit Creek

- Location within Mississippi Location within the United States
- Nearest city: Macon, Mississippi
- Coordinates: 33°0′35.56″N 88°45′15.03″W
- Area: 40 acres (16 ha)
- Built: 1830
- NRHP reference No.: 73001024
- USMS No.: 103-MSH-6001-NHL-ML

Significant dates
- Added to NRHP: April 3, 1973
- Designated NHL: June 19, 1996
- Designated USMS: May 1, 1986

The Dancing Rabbit Creek Treaty Site is a historic Choctaw Native American gathering place in rural Noxubee County, Mississippi. Located near a freshwater spring above the floodplain of Dancing Rabbit Creek in the southwestern part of the county, it was the site of a treaty negotiation between the Choctaw and the federal government in 1830, resulting in the Treaty of Dancing Rabbit Creek, in which the Choctaw agreed to surrender their ancestral lands for territory in what is now Oklahoma. It was the first treaty negotiated after passage of the Indian Removal Act, and served as a model for other treaties passed pursuant to that act. It also led to the Choctaw Trail of Tears. The site, now marked by a stone memorial and a small Choctaw cemetery, was designated a National Historic Landmark in 1996.

== Description and history ==
The Dancing Rabbit Creek Treaty Site is located in a remote wooded area of southwestern Noxubee County, on the southeast side of Dancing Rabbit Creek. It is accessed via Monument Road, where the commemorative marker and cemetery mark the center of the landmarked area. There are no historical structures standing in the area, although there was at the time of the treaty negotiation a Choctaw meeting house which was the central point of the meeting that culminated in the treaty signing. The granite marker was placed in 1928 by the local chapter of the Daughters of the American Revolution. It soon became the focus of Choctaw commemorative activities, including the burial of some of their dead. The marker's placement was based on research conducted in the late 19th century by Henry S. Halbert, a Choctaw historian, that included oral histories from witnesses and individuals who had known witnesses to the proceedings.

The Choctaw were one of the "Five Civilized Tribes" of the southeastern United States, which had to some extent adopted Euro-American customs, and developed an independent tribal government system including a constitution. Despite this, pressure from white settlers for their lands (historically including parts of Mississippi, Alabama, and Louisiana) had prompted the tribe to ceded some of its lands in the 1820s. President Andrew Jackson, upon taking office in 1828, sought the removal of the Choctaw and other southeastern tribes to lands in what was then termed the Indian Territory, now Oklahoma. The treaty negotiations with the Choctaw took place between September 15 and 27, 1830. The proceedings were attended by several thousand Choctaw, a number of opportunistic white entrepreneurs, who offered gambling, drink, and other vices to the assemblage, and John H. Eaton and John Coffee, the federal government representatives. Many Choctaw expressed disapproval of the treaty offered for consideration on September 22, and a large number left the encampment over the next few days. Three major chiefs signed the treaty, under a questionable set of conditions that may have included threats, bribery, and extortion. The vast majority of Choctaw were removed to Oklahoma in 1831–33.

== See also ==
- List of National Historic Landmarks in Mississippi
- National Register of Historic Places listings in Noxubee County, Mississippi
