= National Register of Historic Places listings in Noxubee County, Mississippi =

Location of Noxubee County in Mississippi

This is a list of the National Register of Historic Places listings in Noxubee County, Mississippi.

This is intended to be a complete list of the properties and districts on the National Register of Historic Places in Noxubee County, Mississippi, United States. Latitude and longitude coordinates are provided for many National Register properties and districts; these locations may be seen together in a map.

There are 13 properties and districts listed on the National Register in the county, including 1 National Historic Landmark.

This National Park Service list is complete through NPS recent listings posted October 23, 2026.

== Current listings ==
	Name on the Register	Image	Date listed	Location	City or town	Description
1	Central Shuqualak Historic District	Central Shuqualak Historic District	August 26, 1980 (#80002297)	Off Mississippi Highway 39; 32°58′47″N 88°34′01″W	Shuqualak	
2	Dancing Rabbit Creek Treaty Site	Dancing Rabbit Creek Treaty Site	April 3, 1973 (#73001024)	Around Dancing Rabbit Spring, southwest of Macon; 33°00′35″N 88°45′15″W	Macon	
3	Flora House	Flora House	December 2, 1982 (#82000577)	6872 MS-39; 32°58′40″N 88°34′18″W	Shuqualak	
4	Goodwin-Harrison House	Goodwin-Harrison House	November 28, 1980 (#80002296)	213 N. Jefferson St. 33°06′48″N 88°33′37″W	Macon	
5	Macon Historic District	Macon Historic District	March 21, 2002 (#02000207)	Roughly bounded by Adams, Pearl, West, and Wayne Sts. 33°07′09″N 88°33′39″W	Macon	
6	Maudwin	Maudwin	August 29, 1985 (#85001929)	101 Washington St. 33°06′36″N 88°33′32″W	Macon	
7	McGeehee-Ames House	McGeehee-Ames House	July 10, 1992 (#92000853)	Magnolia Dr. south of its junction with U.S. Route 45; 33°08′29″N 88°33′20″W	Macon	
8	Old Noxubee County Jail	Old Noxubee County Jail	January 8, 1979 (#79001333)	209 Monroe St. 33°06′22″N 88°33′38″W	Macon	
9	Old Noxubee County Jail of 1870	Old Noxubee County Jail of 1870	January 3, 1991 (#90002102)	503 S. Washington St. 33°06′02″N 88°33′35″W	Macon	
10	Running Water Creek Bridge		November 16, 1988 (#88002487)	Spans Running Water Creek on a county road 33°01′05″N 88°36′50″W	Shuqualak	
11	Old Salem School	Old Salem School	January 26, 1990 (#89002323)	3.4 miles west of Macon on Mississippi Highway 14; 33°05′42″N 88°36′51″W	Macon	
12	William Henry Scales House	William Henry Scales House	August 9, 2002 (#02000858)	1108 Magnolia Dr. 33°07′58″N 88°33′20″W	Macon	
13	Yates-Flora House	Yates-Flora House	December 2, 1982 (#82000578)	100 N. Wayne St. 33°06′37″N 88°33′28″W	Macon	

== See also ==
- List of National Historic Landmarks in Mississippi
- National Register of Historic Places listings in Mississippi
