= Franklin County Schools (North Carolina) =

School district in Louisburg, United States

Location
- Franklin County, North Carolina; 53 West River Road; Louisburg, NC 27549 United States

District information
- Type: Public
- Grades: PK–12
- Superintendent: Dr. Rhonda Schuhler
- Schools: 16
- Budget: $ 82,095,000
- NCES District ID: 3701530

Students and staff
- Students: 7,769 (2022-2023)
- Teachers: 582.66 (on FTE basis)
- Staff: 471.65 (on FTE basis)
- Student–teacher ratio: 14.87:1

Other information
- Website: https://www.fcschools.net/

Franklin County Schools is a PK–12 graded school district serving Franklin County, North Carolina, United States. Its 16 schools serve 7,769 students as of the 2022–23 school year. The administrative offices are located in Louisburg.

== Student demographics ==
For the 2022–23 school year, Franklin County Schools had a total population of 7,769 students and 582.66 teachers on a (FTE) basis. This produced a student-teacher ratio of 14.87:1. That same year, out of the student total, the gender ratio was 52% male to 48% female. The demographic group makeup was: 37% White, 31% Black, 25% Hispanic, 6% Two or more Races, .6% Asian, .4% American Indian. For the same school year, 72% of the students received free and reduced-cost lunches.

== Governance ==
The primary governing body of Franklin County Schools follows a council–manager government format with a seven-member Board of Education appointing a Superintendent to run the day-to-day operations of the system. The school system currently resides in the North Carolina State Board of Education's Third District.

=== Board of education ===
The seven members of the Board of Education are elected by district (five districts and two at-large seats) in staggered four-year terms. They generally meet on the second Monday of each month. The current members of the board are: Meghan Jordan (District 1, Chair), Chris Perry (District 5, Vice-Chair), Dr. Elizabeth Keith (District 3), Thomas Piper (District 2), Candice Hinton (District 4), Thomas Harris (At-large) and Paige Sayles (At-large).

=== Superintendent ===
Dr. Rhonda Schuhler currently serves as the Franklin County Schools Superintendent.

== Member schools ==
Franklin County Schools has 16 schools ranging from pre-kindergarten to twelfth grade. Those 16 schools are separated into four high schools, four middle schools, and eight elementary schools.

=== High schools ===
- Bunn High School (Bunn)
- Franklin County Early College (Louisburg)
- Franklinton High School (Franklinton)
- Louisburg High School (Louisburg)

=== Middle schools ===
- Bunn Middle School (Bunn)
- Cedar Creek Middle School (Youngsville)
- Franklinton Middle School (Franklinton)
- Terrell Lane Middle School (Louisburg)

=== Elementary schools ===
- Bunn Elementary School (Bunn)
- Edward Best Elementary School (Louisburg)
- Franklinton Elementary School (Franklinton)
- Laurel Mill Elementary School (Louisburg)
- Long Mill Elementary School (Youngsville)
- Louisburg Elementary School (Louisburg)
- Royal Elementary School (Louisburg)
- Youngsville Elementary School [year-round] (Youngsville)

== Athletics ==
According to the North Carolina High School Athletic Association, for the 2021-2025 conference realignment: Bunn, Franklinton and Louisburg high schools are all in the Big East Conference, with Bunn and Louisburg being Class 2A and Franklinton being Class 3A. The early college does not have any athletic teams, but students that attend the early college are eligible to try out for the high school team in their home district.

== See also ==
- List of school districts in North Carolina
