= Goodwin-Harrison House =

Historic house in Mississippi, United States

- U.S. National Register of Historic Places
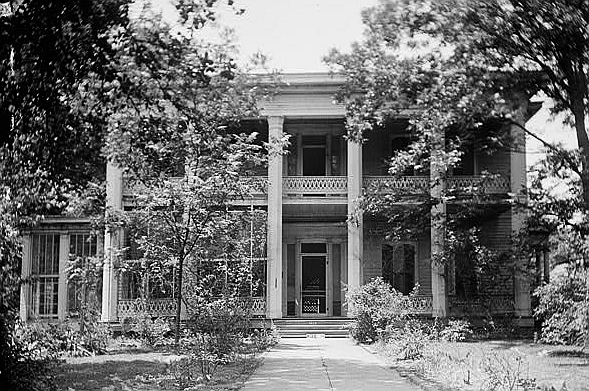
- The Goodwin-Harrison House in 1936

- Location within Mississippi
- Location: 213 N. Jefferson St., Macon, Mississippi
- Coordinates: 33°6′48″N 88°33′37″W
- Area: 1 acre (0.40 ha)
- Built: 1852
- Architectural style: Greek Revival
- NRHP reference No.: 80002296
- Added to NRHP: November 28, 1980

The Goodwin-Harrison House is a historic mansion in Macon, Mississippi, U.S.. It was built in 1852 for W. W. Goodwin, a planter. It was designed in the Greek Revival architectural style. From 1873 to 1882, it was home to a boys' school run by W. W. Baird. It was purchased by Nathaniel H. Harrison, a banker, in 1882. It has been listed on the National Register of Historic Places since November 28, 1980.
