= Wallace-McGee House =

Historic house in South Carolina, United States

- U.S. National Register of Historic Places
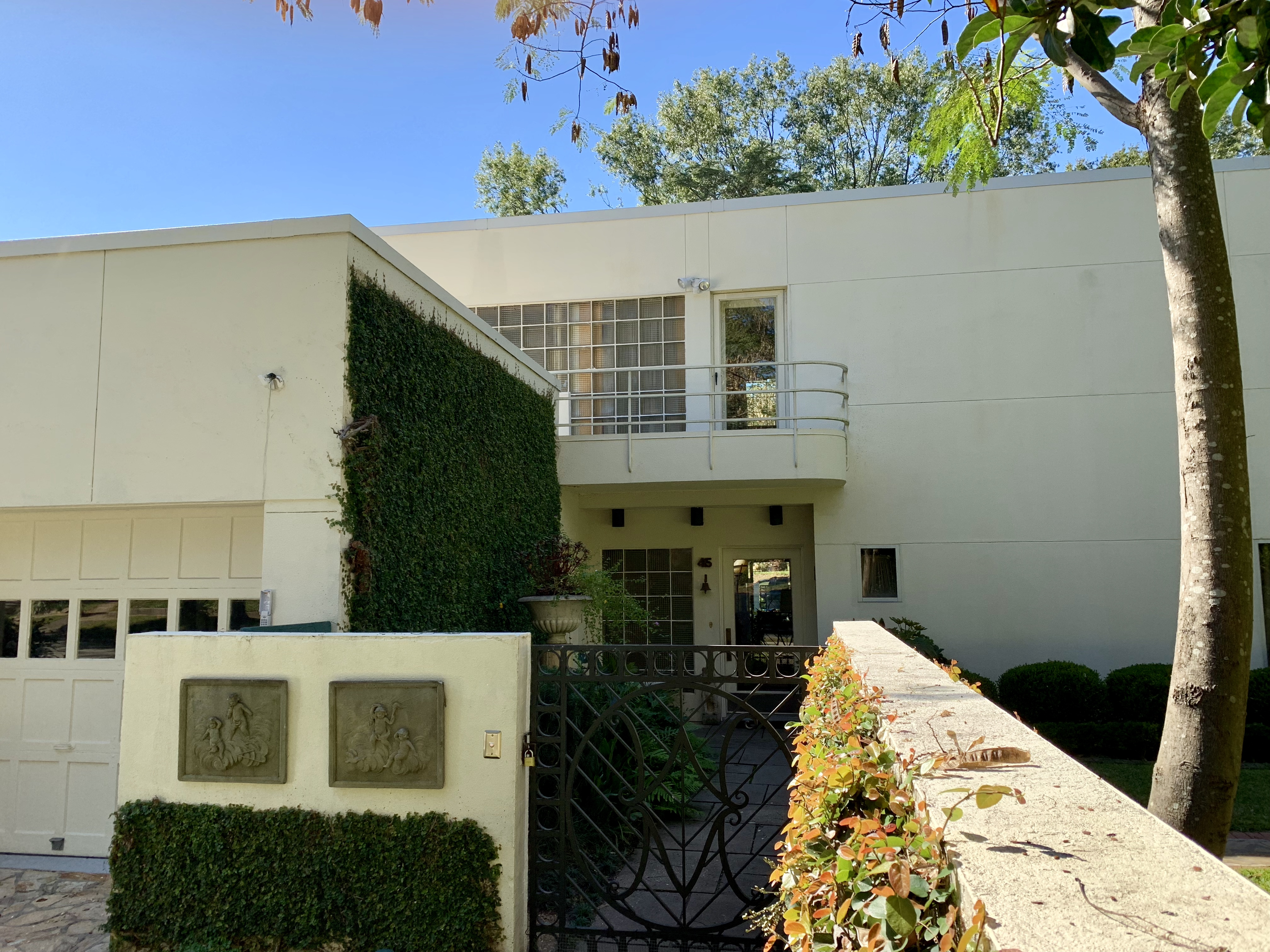

- Location within South Carolina Location within the United States
- Location: 415 Harden St. Columbia, South Carolina
- Coordinates: 33°59′43″N 81°0′53″W
- Area: 0.5 acres (0.20 ha)
- Built: 1937
- Built by: Lyles, W.G.; Wessinger & Stork
- Architect: Stone, Edward Durell
- Architectural style: International Style
- MPS: Columbia MRA
- NRHP reference No.: 79003379
- Added to NRHP: March 2, 1979

Wallace-McGee House is a historic home located at Columbia, South Carolina. It built in 1937, and is a two-story International style stuccoed house. It features large areas of glass, a flat roof and a steel and reinforced concrete structural system. The front façade features a two-car garage topped by a sun deck. The house is based on plans by Edward Durell Stone published in Collier's Magazine on March 28, 1936.

It was added to the National Register of Historic Places in 1979.
