= C.L. and Bessie G. McGhee House =

Historic house in North Carolina, United States

- U.S. National Register of Historic Places
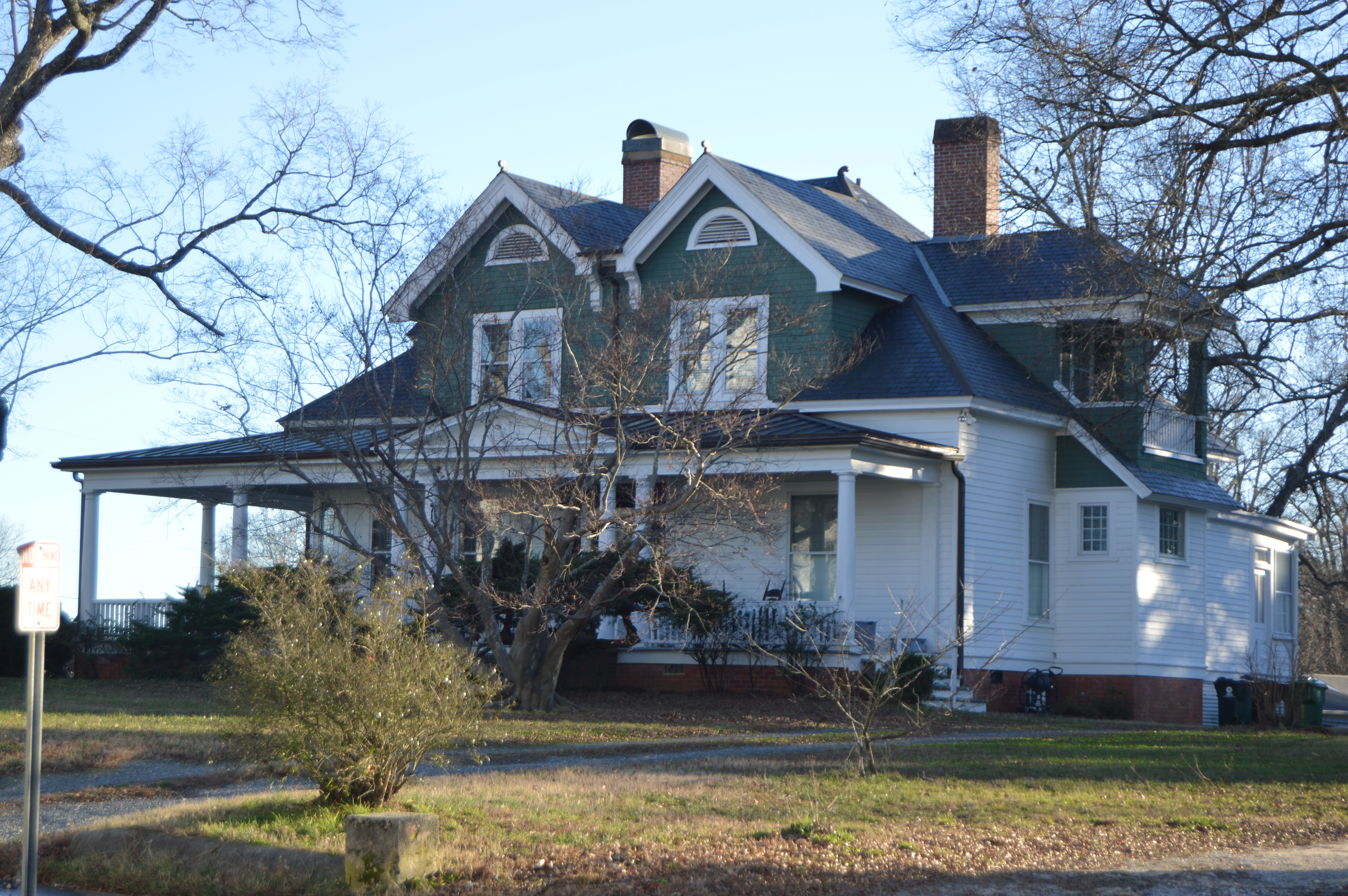
- Front and western side of the house

- Location within North Carolina Location within the United States
- Location: 103 W. Mason St., Franklinton, North Carolina
- Coordinates: 36°6′14″N 78°27′33″W
- Area: Less than 1 acre (0.40 ha)
- Built: 1911
- Architect: Keller, H.P.S.
- Architectural style: Colonial Revival, Bungalow/craftsman
- NRHP reference No.: 07000903
- Added to NRHP: September 5, 2007

C.L. and Bessie G. McGhee House is a historic home located at 103 West Mason Street in Franklinton, Franklin County, North Carolina. It was built in 1911, and is a 1 1/2-story, three-bay, blended Colonial Revival / Bungalow style frame dwelling. The house has a steeply pitched hipped roof and stands on a full brick foundation. It features a one-story hip-roof wraparound porch and the interior has original wallpaper by M. H. Birge Company of Buffalo, New York. Also on the property is a contributing outbuilding (c. 1920).

It was listed on the National Register of Historic Places in 2007.
