= Louisburg High School (North Carolina) =

American public school in North Carolina

Coordinates: 36.1101°N 78.3002°W

Location
- 201 Allen Lane; Louisburg, North Carolina, Franklin County 27549

Information
- Type: Public
- Motto: Seize opportunities; practice excellence; create the future
- School district: Franklin County Schools
- Superintendent: Rhonda Schuler
- Principal: Melissa Thomas
- Grades: 9-12
- Enrollment: 536 (2022–2023)
- Student to teacher ratio: 12.97 (2019–2020)
- Colors: Blue and orange
- Mascot: Warrior
- Website: www.fcschools.net

Louisburg High School is in Louisburg, North Carolina. The student body has a mix of white, African American, and Hispanic students. The school colors are orange and blue. Warriors are the school mascot.

== History ==
It was listed as a private school for whites in 1893. In 1913, funding was provided for it as a public school.

Historian E. H. Davis was listed as principal of the school in 1915. W. R. Mills was principal in 1915–1916, its first four year high school term.

== Demographics ==
The demographic breakdown of the 536 students enrolled in the 2022–2023 school year was:

- American Indian – 0.4%
- Asian – 0.4%
- African American – 34%
- Hispanic – 27%
- Pacific Islander – 0.2%
- Caucasian – 33%
- Biracial – 5%

== See also ==
- Louisburg College
- List of high schools in North Carolina
