= Person–McGhee Farm =

Historic farm in North Carolina, United States

- U.S. National Register of Historic Places
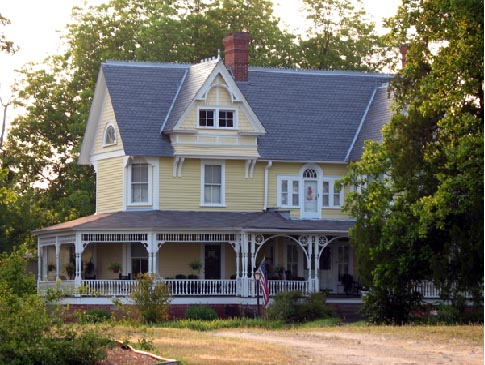
- The historic Person–McGhee Farm located near Franklinton, North Carolina.

- Location within North Carolina Location within the United States
- Location: US 1, Franklinton, North Carolina
- Coordinates: 36°09′36″N 78°27′11″W
- Area: 500 acres (200 ha)
- Built: c. 1800
- Architectural style: Mixed (more Than 2 Styles From Different Periods)
- NRHP reference No.: 79003343
- Added to NRHP: June 26, 1979

Person–McGhee Farm is a historic farm complex located at 5631 U.S. Highway 1 in Franklinton, Franklin County, North Carolina, about 4 miles (6 kilometers) north of town. The earliest section of the house was built sometime between 1770 and 1820, and is a three-bay, two-story frame dwelling over a stone-walled cellar. It has double shouldered brick end chimneys. In the 1890s, a large 2 1/2-story Queen Anne / Colonial Revival style section was added to the original Federal period dwelling. Also on the property are the contributing tenant house (1860s-1870s), a water tower, smokehouse, cattle barn, three log tobacco barns, and several sheds.

The farm was threatened during a wildfire which occurred on February 10, 2008. Two old sheds were destroyed, but the rest of the property was able to be saved.

It was listed on the National Register of Historic Places in 1979.
