= Michael Guest =

Michael Guest may refer to:

- Michael Guest (fl. 1957–1975), British actor, see Marco Polo (Doctor Who)
- Michael E. Guest (born 1957), American diplomat
- Michael Guest (politician) (born 1970), American attorney and politician
