= Franklinton, North Carolina =

- Town
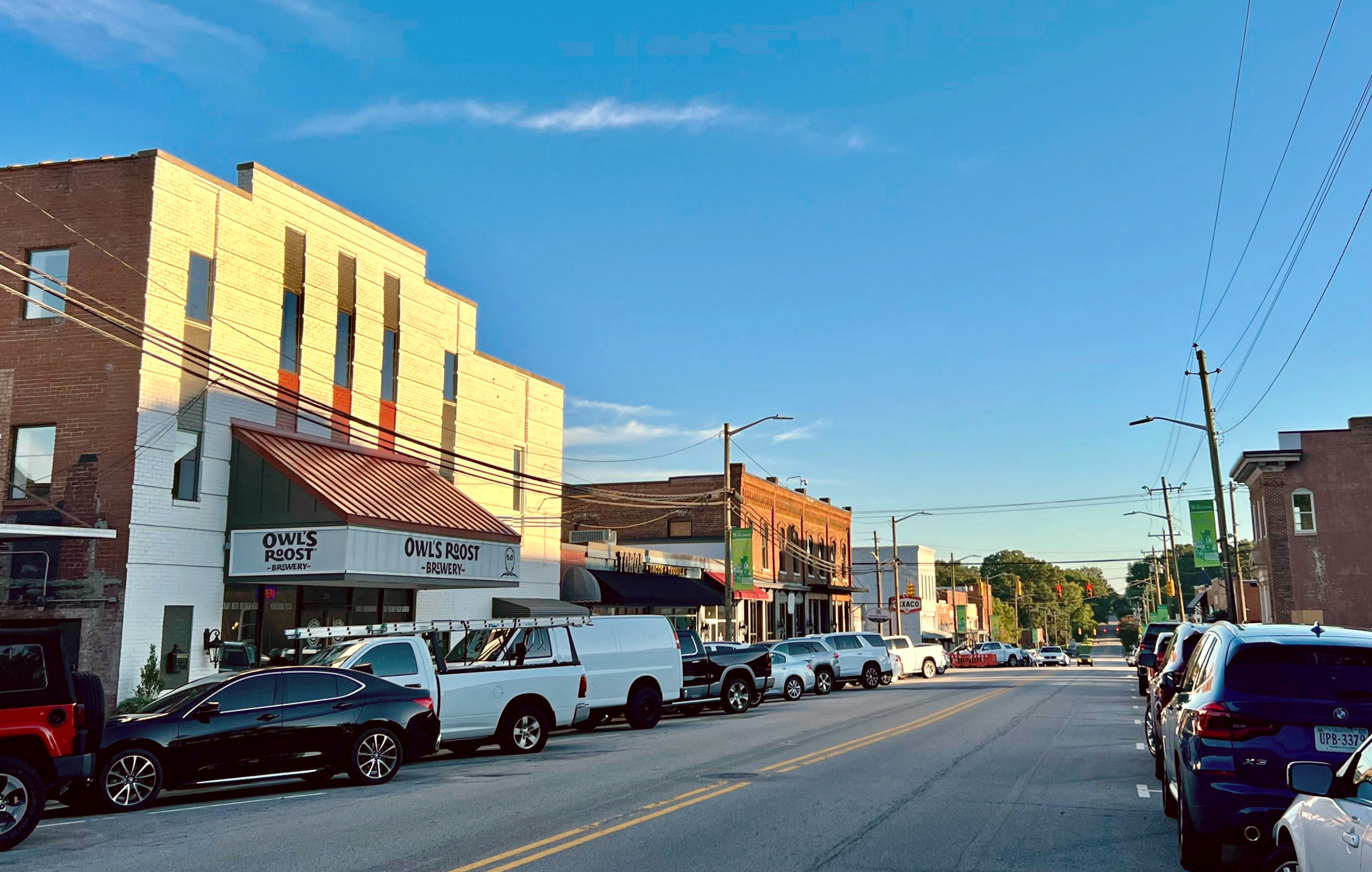
- Downtown Franklinton

- Seal
- Motto(s): Small Town, Home Town, Your Town
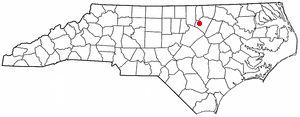
- Location of Franklinton, North Carolina
- Coordinates: 36°06′04″N 78°27′18″W
- Country: United States
- State: North Carolina
- County: Franklin
- Established: 1839
- Incorporated: December 20, 1842
- Named for: Benjamin Franklin

Government
  - Type: Board of Commissioners
  - Mayor: Arthur L. Wright (D)

Area
  - Total: 1.75 sq mi (4.52 km^{2})
  - Land: 1.74 sq mi (4.50 km^{2})
  - Water: 0.0077 sq mi (0.02 km^{2})
- Elevation: 404 ft (123 m)

Population (2020)
  - Total: 2,456
  - Density: 1,413.6/sq mi (545.81/km^{2})
- Time zone: UTC-5 (Eastern (EST))
  - Summer (DST): UTC-4 (EDT)
- ZIP code: 27525
- Area codes: 919 and 984
- FIPS code: 37-24720
- GNIS feature ID: 2406521
- Website: https://www.franklintonnc.gov/

Franklinton is a town in Franklin County, North Carolina, United States. The population was 2,456 at the 2020 census.

== History ==
Franklinton, was established as Franklin Depot in 1839 on land owned by Shemuel Kearney (1791–1860), son of Crawford Kearney and Nancy White. A home constructed by grandfather Shemuel Kearney (1734–1808) was originally located south of town and is currently the second oldest residence in Franklin County, built in 1759. The building was purchased in 2009 and moved to nearby Louisburg for restoration. Franklin Depot changed its name to Franklinton in 1842 when the town was incorporated. Like Franklin County, Franklinton was named for Benjamin Franklin.

Generous offers by local businessmen Washington Duke and Julian S. Carr brought Trinity College to the city of Durham in 1892. This well known school is now called Duke University. A source from the University Archives states that nearby Raleigh was actually the initial approved bidder. This does not mean Franklinton wasn't included as a possible site, mentioned by some locals, even though no other bidding communities are mentioned. The citizens of Raleigh offered land now occupied by North Carolina State University and pledged $35,000.00 for a new building which was quickly approved by the Methodist Conference for Trinity College. It eventually lost to a higher bid of $85,000.00 plus donations in 1890.

In December 1919, an African-American veteran of World War I named Powell Green got involved in an altercation with a white man named R.M. Brown over smoking in the movie theater, and Green allegedly killed Brown. The police arrested Green, but then a lynch mob seized him, pulled him behind a car for two miles, and hung him from a tree.

Franklinton was once home to Albion Academy, a co-educational African-American school started by clergyman Moses A. Hopkins in 1879. Once a State Normal & Industrial School (trade school), it eventually became a graded school and later merged with the B.F. Person School in 1957 to become B.F. Person-Albion High School. When schools were fully integrated, the upper grades consolidated with Franklinton High School in 1969. Mary Little was the first African-American teacher to begin teaching at the newly integrated Franklinton High School, who taught there till her death in 1984. The B.F. Person-Albion High School was renamed Franklinton Elementary School.

Also located in Franklinton is the historic Sterling Cotton Mill, founded by Samuel C. Vann and first opened in 1895. Remaining in the Vann family for many years, the mill was purchased in 1972 by Union Underwear Company, manufacturers of Fruit of the Loom fabric products. Sterling Cotton Mill eventually closed in 1991. It was placed on the National Register of Historic Places in 1996.

Burlington Industries, another well known textile and fabric maker at the time, had a facility located in Franklinton known as Vamoco Mills. It closed in 1989, and was demolished in 2007. A third mill was also located in Franklinton which has since closed.

On June 10, 1946, former heavyweight champion Jack Johnson died in a car crash on U.S. Highway 1 in Franklinton.

On April 4, 1963, the entire town of Franklinton was threatened by a large wildfire which consumed roughly 9,500 acres (38 km^{2}) of woodlands and destroyed several homes north and west of town. A similar incident occurred on February 10, 2008, covering practically the same area (though not as widespread), about 1,000 acres (4.0 km^{2}). There were a couple homes which were damaged during that event. U.S. Highway 1 was temporarily closed adjacent to the affected area while firefighters battled the fires. No injuries were reported. High winds and dry conditions were factors in both incidents.

In 1996 Franklinton, North Carolina became the home of Opio Holy Spirit Academy a private school providing an academic arena for both academically gifted and students who face academic challenges from grades k-12. The school was established and directed by Lenora E. Attles-Allen a former elementary school teacher from Boston, Massachusetts. Allen's work became known and respected in Wake, Granville, Vance, and Franklin counties as well as her dedication to the Franklin County Community Restitution Program. Opio Holy Spirit Academy closed its doors for the last time after the final High School commencement ceremony in 2012.

Charles Draughn III was elected to the mayoral position of Franklinton for 8 years, from 1987 to 1995. He is currently working with family law. He was followed in office by Larry Kearney from 1995 to 2003, Jenny McGhee Edwards from 2003 to 2007 and Elic Senter from 2007 to 2015. Current Mayor Art Wright was elected in 2015.

Franklinton has been a Tree City USA community since 1985.

In addition to the Sterling Cotton Mill, the Franklinton Depot, Dr. J. H. Harris House, Shemuel Kearney House, C.L. and Bessie G. McGhee House, Person-McGhee Farm, Dr. J. A. Savage House, and Aldridge H. Vann House are listed on the National Register of Historic Places. All properties are privately owned and should be respected.

== Geography ==
According to the United States Census Bureau, the town has a total area of 1.6 square miles (4.1 km^{2}), all land.

The center of town is at Main Street (U.S. Highway 1A) and Mason Street. Green Street (N.C. Highway 56) passes just south of that point and U.S. Highway 1 bypasses Franklinton to the west. The town is located approximately 30 miles (48 km) northeast of Raleigh, North Carolina and 4 miles (6.4 km) south of the Tar River.

A railway operated by CSX Transportation currently passes through Franklinton, which is part of the old Seaboard Coast Line Railroad "S-Line". There was also a spur off this line which ran 10 miles (16 km) east from Franklinton to Louisburg, originally built in 1884 by the Louisburg Railroad and leased to the Raleigh & Gaston Railroad as a branch line. The two lines were taken over by Seaboard Air Line Railroad in 1900. From 1985 to 1988, the Franklin County Railroad operated the branch line from Franklinton to Louisburg. The section was sold to the North Carolina Department of Transportation in 1990 and the tracks removed a few years later.

== Demographics ==
Historical population
Census	Pop.	Note	%±
1860	160		—
1870	305		90.6%
1880	484		58.7%
1890	583		20.5%
1900	761		30.5%
1910	809		6.3%
1920	1,058		30.8%
1930	1,320		24.8%
1940	1,273		−3.6%
1950	1,414		11.1%
1960	1,513		7.0%
1970	1,459		−3.6%
1980	1,394		−4.5%
1990	1,615		15.9%
2000	1,745		8.0%
2010	2,023		15.9%
2020	2,456		21.4%
U.S. Decennial Census

=== 2020 census ===
As of the 2020 census, Franklinton had a population of 2,456 and 602 families residing in the town. The median age was 36.5 years. 25.1% of residents were under the age of 18 and 18.2% of residents were 65 years of age or older. For every 100 females there were 86.8 males, and for every 100 females age 18 and over there were 80.2 males age 18 and over.

0.0% of residents lived in urban areas, while 100.0% lived in rural areas.

There were 1,025 households in Franklinton, of which 32.0% had children under the age of 18 living in them. Of all households, 31.9% were married-couple households, 20.8% were households with a male householder and no spouse or partner present, and 40.5% were households with a female householder and no spouse or partner present. About 33.7% of all households were made up of individuals and 16.7% had someone living alone who was 65 years of age or older.

There were 1,169 housing units, of which 12.3% were vacant. The homeowner vacancy rate was 5.0% and the rental vacancy rate was 9.6%.

Franklinton racial composition
Race	Number	Percentage
White (non-Hispanic)	1,121	45.64%
Black or African American (non-Hispanic)	1,012	41.21%
Native American	6	0.24%
Asian	22	0.9%
Other/Mixed	129	5.25%
Hispanic or Latino	166	6.76%

=== 2010 census ===
As of the census of 2010, there were 2,023 people, 876 households, and 551 families residing in the town. The population density was 1,264.4 inhabitants per square mile (488.2/km^{2}). The racial makeup of the town was 55.8% White, 40.8% African American, 0.1% Native American, 0.2% Asian, 0.0% Pacific Islander, 0.7% from other races, and 2.3% from two or more races. Hispanic or Latino of any race were 4.1% of the population.

There were 876 households, out of which 23.2% had children under the age of 18 living with them, 35.8% were married couples living together, 21.7% had a female householder with no husband present, and 37.1% were non-families. 33.1% of all households were made up of individuals, and 16.1% had someone living alone who was 65 years of age or older. The average household size was 2.31 and the average family size was 2.92.

In the town, the population was spread out, with 25.7% under the age of 20, 8.3% from 20 to 24, 24.9% from 25 to 44, 21.4% from 45 to 64, and 19.8% who were 65 years of age or older. The median age was 41.4 years. For every 100 females, there were 84.4 males. For every 100 females age 18 and over, there were 80.2 males.

The median income for a household in the town was $30,082, and the median income for a family was $37,656. Males had a median income of $38,015 versus $33,380 for females. The per capita income for the town was $18,193. About 31.9% of families and 36.1% of the population were below the poverty line, including 62.7% of those under age 18 and 18.3% of those age 65 or over.

=== Housing ===
There were 1,008 housing units at an average density of 630.0 per square mile (243.2/km^{2}). 13.1% of housing units were vacant.

There were 876 occupied housing units in the town. 553 were owner-occupied units (63.1%), while 323 were renter-occupied (36.9%). The homeowner vacancy rate was 4.1% of total units. The rental unit vacancy rate was 6.9%.

== Government ==
Franklinton is governed by a mayor and five-member Board of Commissioners, who are elected in staggered four-year terms.

== Notable people ==
- Henry Bibby, Basketball player and NBA coach
- Jim Bibby, Baseball player, Henry's brother
- Wilbur Wade Card, Baseball player, first basketball coach and athletic director at Duke University
- Jason Michael Carroll, Country music singer
- Thomas O. Fuller State senator
- Moses A. Hopkins, Diplomat, clergyman, educator
- Abby House, Eccentric supporter of Confederate soldiers
- Wilmont Perry, NFL Football Player, NCAA Division II Football Player of the Year
- Soupy Sales, Comedian, born Milton Supman
- Gene Wooten, Bluegrass musician. Born 1953 and played in Nashville TN with The Osborne Brothers
