= Sterling Cotton Mill =

Historic building in North Carolina, US

- U.S. National Register of Historic Places
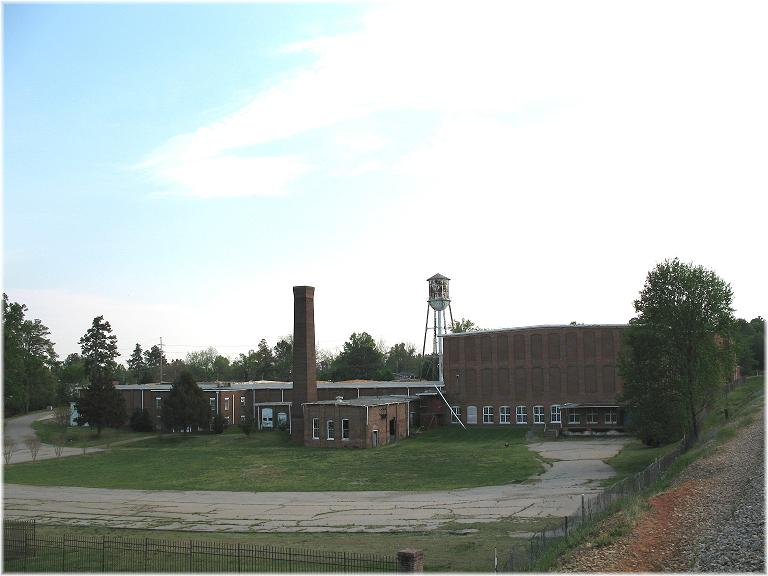
- The historic Sterling Cotton Mill located in Franklinton, North Carolina.

- Location within North Carolina Location within the United States
- Location: SE jct. of Seabord RR tracks and E. Green St., Franklinton, North Carolina
- Coordinates: 36°5′59″N 78°27′25″W
- Area: 7 acres (2.8 ha)
- Built: 1895
- Architectural style: Industrial Italianate
- NRHP reference No.: 96000568
- Added to NRHP: May 16, 1996

Sterling Cotton Mill, also known as the Franklinton Cotton Mill, is a historic cotton mill complex located at 108-112 East Green Street in Franklinton, Franklin County, North Carolina. The main mill is a one and two-story L-shaped brick building with Industrial Italianate style design elements. The mill consists of five sections: the original gabled one-story section rising to a two-story section at the east end (1895); a two-story addition (1914), a one-story addition (1960s); pre-1926 "cotton sheds"; and a small two-story brick office (1966). Associated with the mill is the contributing detached chimney stack. The mill was built by Samuel C. Vann, whose son Aldridge built the Aldridge H. Vann House. The mill closed in 1991.

It was listed on the National Register of Historic Places in 1996. The Sterling Cotton Mill is now home to the Lofts @ Sterling Mill (apartments) and Inter Technologies.
