= City government in Mississippi =

Classes and forms of government of municipalities in Mississippi, United States

As of 2026, there are 299 municipalities in the U.S. state of Mississippi. State law divides them into three classes, provides five forms of municipal government, plus one legacy category, and establishes their respective powers with limited statutory home-rule authority.

== Municipality classes ==
Mississippi law classifies municipalities based on population. The three classes of municipalities in Mississippi are:

- Cities (107)
- Towns (152)
- Villages (40)

Cities are municipalities with a population of 2,000 or more at the time of incorporation or after each decennial census. Among them are Hazlehurst, Kosciusko, Petal, and Tutwiler.

Towns are municipalities with a population of 300 or more and less than 2,000 at the time of incorporation or after each decennial census. Towns in Mississippi include Ackerman, New Augusta, Pittsboro, and Sumrall.

Villages are municipalities with a population of 100 or more and less than 300 at the time of incorporation or after each decennial census. State law currently does not provide for the incorporation of new villages, but existing villages, or cities or towns that fall down into this class, may continue to operate under their existing charters. Examples of villages in Mississippi include Alligator, French Camp, Kossuth, Satartia, and Walthall.

Under state law, municipal governments must review their population after each decennial census to determine if their classification should change. A population change triggers a change in status: a town reaching 2,000 or more residents becomes a city; a city falling below 2,000 becomes a town; and a town falling below 300 becomes a village.

== Home rule ==
Regardless of class, municipalities in Mississippi derive their authority from the Legislature rather than the common law, and as such, their powers are limited to those granted by statute. Mississippi municipalities are granted home rule authority under Mississippi Code §21-17-5, et seq. (1972) (as amended), which allows them to govern themselves in local matters, subject to state law, and generally may adopt ordinances concerning local municipal affairs. Municipalities may also enter into contracts, acquire property, establish departments and agencies to carry out their functions, issue bonds, and levy property taxes. Municipalities cannot, however, levy sales taxes or tourism taxes without specific authorization from the Legislature.

According to the Stennis Institute, early Mississippi Supreme Court decisions and Attorney General opinions generally construed municipal home-rule authority narrowly. The Institute notes that more recent decisions have appeared to relax that approach, citing Maynard v. City of Tupelo (Miss. 1997), as long as they are not inconsistent with state law, or the Constitution.

== Governmental forms ==
A municipality in Mississippi can be described secondarily by its form of government. Cities, towns, and villages are authorized five forms of government. Municipalities operating under older charters are allowed to continue under them through a sixth legacy category.

Current statutory forms:

- Code charter (over 95% of municipalities)
- Commission (2 municipalities)
- Council (0 municipalities)
- Mayor–council (10 municipalities)
- Council–manager (7 municipalities)

Legacy category:

- Private charter (20 municipalities)

=== Code charter ===
Most municipalities in Mississippi have this form of government, sometimes referred to as the mayor-aldermen, or "weak mayor," form, which calls for an elected mayor and an elected Board of Aldermen. Examples of municipalities using this form of government are Southaven, Waynesboro, and Olive Branch. Under this form, municipalities with a population of 10,000 or more must have 7 aldermen, 6 of whom may be elected by ward and 1 at-large, or all 7 may be elected at-large. Municipalities with a population of less than 10,000 must have 5 aldermen, and they may be elected at-large, by ward, or a combination of both. Municipalities with a population of less than 500 may have 3 aldermen, if approved in a special election. Regardless of the size of the Board, the mayor and aldermen are elected to four-year terms. The mayor chairs meetings of the Board of Aldermen, but does not vote except in case of a tie, and can veto ordinances. The mayor acts as the chief executive of the municipality's offices and departments. The Board of Aldermen functions as the municipality's legislature and has no authority over offices and departments.

In addition to the mayor and aldermen, citizens of these municipalities also elect the municipal judge, the marshal or chief of police, the tax collector, and the tax assessor, unless the municipal government passes an ordinance to make any of these positions appointed by a majority vote of the mayor and aldermen. Some of these positions may be merged by ordinance. The mayor and aldermen also appoint a city or town clerk to serve as a municipal officer.

=== Commission ===
Under this form of government, the mayor is elected at-large as the presiding commissioner but otherwise has no additional authority, and the commissioners are elected from single-member wards. There must be a minimum of two commissioners, but more may be authorized by ordinance. The cities of Clarksdale and Vicksburg are the only municipalities using the commission form of government, Clarksdale with four commissioners, and Vicksburg with two; both use the title Alderman for their commissioners.

=== Council ===
The statute authorizing this form of government was narrowly written so as to apply to only one municipality: Tupelo. Tupelo has since abandoned it for mayor-council. Because the statute is tied to the 1940 census and a municipality meeting specific historical conditions, no additional municipalities can qualify under the statute, so this category is effectively defunct.

=== Mayor-council ===
A handful of municipalities in Mississippi have this form of government, sometimes referred to as a "strong mayor" system, which calls for an elected mayor who acts as the executive authority over offices and departments, and an elected city council, which acts as the legislative authority, similar to the Code charter form. Unlike the Code charter form, the mayor does not preside over council meetings or cast tie-breaking votes; the council elects their own presiding officer from among their members. Such municipalities include Jackson, Hattiesburg, and Tupelo.

=== Council-manager ===
Municipalities with an elected council and an appointed city manager include Diamondhead, Grenada, and Picayune.

=== Private charter ===
Private charter, sometimes called Special charter municipalities, either retained their previous form of government that existed prior to the 1890 Constitution or have been granted a private charter by the state legislature. Municipalities with private charters include Aberdeen, Natchez, and McComb.

== See also ==
- Mississippi
- List of municipalities in Mississippi
- Municipal law
- Home rule in the United States
