= Yates-Flora House =

Historic house in Mississippi, United States

- U.S. National Register of Historic Places
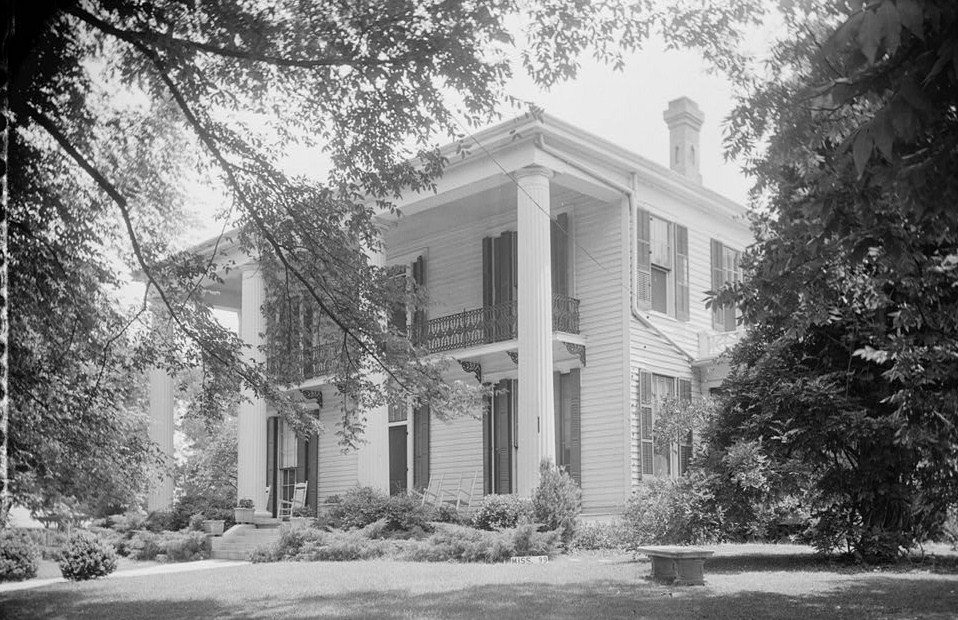
- The Yates-Flora House in 1936

- Location within Mississippi
- Location: 100 N. Wayne Street, Macon, Mississippi
- Coordinates: 33°6′37″N 88°33′28″W
- Area: 4.3 acres (1.7 ha)
- Built: 1868; 158 years ago
- Architectural style: Greek Revival
- NRHP reference No.: 82000578
- Added to NRHP: December 2, 1982

The Yates-Flora House is a historic mansion in Macon, Mississippi, U.S.. It was built in 1868 for John Lee Williams. It was designed in the Greek Revival architectural style. In 1906, it was purchased by E. V. Yates, a large landowner. It remained in the Yates family until 1961. It has been listed on the National Register of Historic Places since December 2, 1982.
