= Franklinton High School (North Carolina) =

American public school in North Carolina

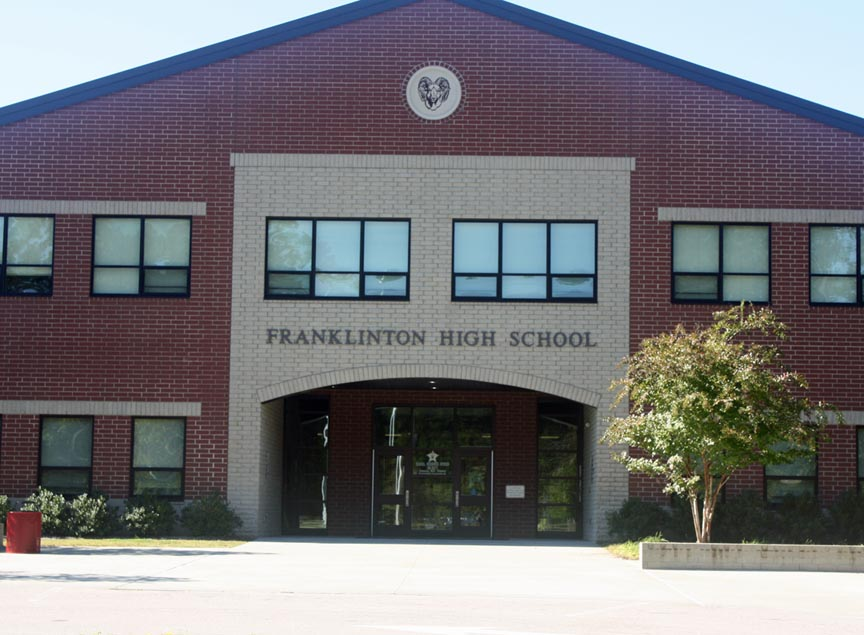

Location
- 910 Cedar Creek Road; Franklinton, North Carolina 27525; United States
- Coordinates: 36°04′16″N 78°26′09″W

Information
- School type: Public, High School
- Motto: "A Tradition of Excellence"
- Established: 1907 (119 years ago)
- School board: Franklin County Schools
- School district: Franklin County School District
- CEEB code: 341375
- Principal: Dr. David C. Westbrook (2025-present)
- Teaching staff: 65.99 (FTE)
- Grades: 9–12
- Enrollment: 1,218 (2023-2024)
- Student to teacher ratio: 18.46
- Campus type: Rural
- Colors: Red and white
- Athletics conference: Big East Conference (Class 3A)
- Mascot: Red Rams
- Website: fhs.fcschools.net

Franklinton High School is a public school for secondary education located near Franklinton, North Carolina, United States, about 4 miles (6.4 kilometres) southeast of the town. It serves the rapidly expanding western areas of Franklin County and has seen significant growth in the past several years. The new campus was constructed in 2010 to replace the old high school that was built in the town of Franklinton in 1923. The new high school currently serves grades 9 through 12 for students residing in the Franklinton and Youngsville areas. There was originally a high school located in Youngsville, but it was closed and students in Youngsville began attending Bunn High School in 1978. Youngsville High School was demolished and a new elementary school was built in its place, called Youngsville Elementary School. The new Franklinton High School was opened to students on August 25, 2011 to start the 2011–2012 school year.

Franklinton High School is three floors although the building is situated on an incline. The lower level (downhill side) primarily consists of the cafeteria, auditorium, gymnasium and vocational wing including art, music, technology, shop and agriculture. All of the sports fields are also on the downhill side heading towards Cedar Creek. Two floors are on the upper level (uphill side) which consist of the administrative offices and library along with the English, math, science, social studies and foreign language wings.

== History ==
The old high school initially started as a graded school for white students in 1924, first known as Franklinton Public School. When schools were fully integrated in 1969, the upper grades were consolidated with B.F. Person-Albion High School which had educated African-American students. The lower grades were moved to that school and was renamed Franklinton Elementary School. Franklinton Public School became Franklinton High School.

== Demographics ==
Student Demographics – 1,218 Students Enrolled (2023-2024)

- 38% White, 35% Black, 20% Hispanic, 6% Two or More Races, .9% Asian, .1% American Indian/Alaska Native

== See also ==
- Franklin County Schools
