= Dallas Township, Gaston County, North Carolina =

Coordinates: 35°20′18″N 81°10′32″W

- Township
- Interactive map of Dallas Township, Gaston County, North Carolina
- Country: United States
- State: North Carolina
- County: Gaston

Area
  - Total: 57.7 sq mi (149.5 km^{2})
  - Land: 57.3 sq mi (148.3 km^{2})
  - Water: 0.50 sq mi (1.3 km^{2})

Population (2020)
  - Total: 23,896
  - Density: 417/sq mi (161.1/km^{2})
- FIPS code: 37-90872
- GNIS feature ID: 1026698

Dallas Township is a township in north-central Gaston County, North Carolina, United States. As of the 2010 census it had a population of 21,436. It includes the incorporated towns of Dallas, High Shoals (a portion of which is in Cherryville Township), and Stanley (shared with Riverbend Township). It also includes small portions of the city of Gastonia and a small outlying portion of the town of Ranlo. Unincorporated areas in the township include Alexis, Hardins, Ashebrook Park, and Vinton Woods.

== Demographics ==
Historical population
Census	Pop.	Note	%±
2000	19,542		—
2010	21,436		9.7%
2020	23,896		11.5%
U.S. Decennial Census

As of the census of 2020, there were 19,542 people and 8,004 housing units in the township. The population density was 417.0 inhabitants per square mile (161.0/km^{2}) and the average density of housing units was 174.4 per square mile. The racial makeup of the township was 76.75% White, 11.65% African American, 0.46% Native American, 0.86% Asian, 4.21% from other races, and 6.03% from two or more races. Hispanic or Latino of any race were 7.17% of the population.

== Geography ==
According to the United States Census Bureau, the township covers a total area of 57.7 square miles (149.5 km^{2}), with 57.3 square miles (148.3 km^{2}), or 99.2 percent, of it land. Pasour Mountain, a monadnock ridge and local high point at elevation 1,220 feet (370 m), forms the boundary between Dallas Township and Cherryville Township to the west.

== Government ==
Townships in Gaston County do not exercise any administrative function and have no political leadership. They are, however, used for representation on the seven-member Gaston County Board of Commissioners. Those that file for a particular seat must live in that township. However, the vote is countywide or "at-large". Dallas Township has one seat on the Commission. It is currently held by Republican Tracy L. Philbeck of Dallas, who serves as Vice-Chairman of the Commission.
