= North Gaston High School =

American public school in North Carolina

Location
- 1133 Ratchford Drive; Dallas, North Carolina 28034; United States; 35°20′04″N 81°10′39″W

Information
- Established: 1971 (55 years ago)
- School district: Gaston County Schools
- Category: Public
- CEEB code: 340965
- Principal: Page Willis
- Teaching staff: 61.54 (FTE)
- Enrollment: 1,083 (2023–2024)
- Student to teacher ratio: 17.60
- Colors: Black and gold
- Team name: Wildcats
- Rivals: East Gaston
- Website: northgaston.gaston.k12.nc.us

North Gaston High School is a public high school in the Gaston County Schools school district located in Dallas, North Carolina, United States. Its attendance range covers the central portion of northern Gaston County and it also serves the communities of Ranlo, Hardins, High Shoals, Ashebrook Park, Spencer Mountain, and parts of North Gastonia, as well as the surrounding rural areas. Page Willis serves as principal, and Jesse Martin serves as athletic director. Feeder middle schools are W.C. Friday and Holbrook.

== History ==
North Gaston opened shortly after the merger of Gastonia City Schools, Gaston County Schools, and Cherryville City Schools; replacing Dallas High School and serving the central portion of northern Gaston County. The building was constructed at a cost of $2.5 million, or $19.9 million in current value.

=== Principals ===
John McClure (1971–1977)*; Milton Shellman (1977–1982); James Costner (1982–1991); William "Butch" Adams (1991–1994); Steve Laws (1994–1997); Charles Ashley (1997–2000)	Gary Short (2000–2002); Christine Kisner (2002–2004); Brent Boone (2004–2011); Judy Moore (2011–2016); George Conner (2016–2022); Crystal Houser (2022–2024); Page Willis (2024–present)

(*) Dallas High School principal (1968–1971)

== Facilities ==
Situated on 100 acres of land, the original single building was joined by a separate new classroom wing and a second gymnasium some years later.

== Notable alumni ==
- Jake Buchanan, MLB pitcher
- Duane Ross, track and field Olympian, represented USA in the 110 metres hurdles at the 2004 Summer Olympics
