= Cherryville Township, Gaston County, North Carolina =

Coordinates: 35°22′06″N 81°21′12″W

- Township
- Interactive map of Cherryville Township, Gaston County, North Carolina
- Country: United States
- State: North Carolina
- County: Gaston

Area
  - Total: 65.6 sq mi (170.0 km^{2})
  - Land: 65.2 sq mi (168.8 km^{2})
  - Water: 0.50 sq mi (1.3 km^{2})

Population (2020)
  - Total: 16,714
  - Density: 260/sq mi (99/km^{2})
- FIPS code: 37-90644
- GNIS feature ID: 1026696

Cherryville Township is a township in northwestern Gaston County, North Carolina, United States. As of the 2010 census it had a population of 16,500. It includes the incorporated city of Cherryville, the inactive incorporated town of Dellview, the unincorporated community of Tryon, and a portion of the town of High Shoals (most of which is in Dallas Township). It is represented on the Gaston County Board of Commissioners by Allen Fraley of Cherryville.

== Demographics ==
Historical population
Census	Pop.	Note	%±
2000	15,724		—
2010	16,500		4.9%
2020	16,714		1.3%
U.S. Decennial Census

Cherryville Township had a reported population in the 2020 United States Census of 16,714. This includes 6,078 people in the incorporated City of Cherryville. The racial makeup of the township was 83.79% White, 6.91% African American, 0.32% Native American, 0.52% Asian, 2.33% from other races, and 6.11% from two or more races. Hispanic or Latino of any race were 5.03% of the population.

Voting-age population figures from the 2000 Census are reported for each of the township's five voting precincts. Three of the precincts are in the northwestern part of the township near Cherryville, one in the south near Tryon, and one in the northeast near Landers Chapel Methodist Church. The township's total voting-age population was 8507, or itemized by area:

- Cherryville area election precincts - population 5399
- Tryon precinct - pop. 1524
- Landers Chapel precinct - pop. 1584

== Geography ==
Cherryville Township occupies a total area of 65.33 square miles (169.2 km^{2}). Pasour Mountain, a monadnock ridge and local high point at elevation 1,220 feet (370 m), forms the boundary between Cherryville Township and Dallas Township to the east.

Cherryville Township lies within six watersheds. The northwest corner of the township is in the Buffalo Creek watershed and the area southwest of Cherryville in the watershed of Muddy Fork Creek (itself a tributary of Buffalo Creek). These watersheds are in the Broad River catchment basin and most of their area is in Cleveland County. Highway 274 / Mountain Street generally follows the watershed separating the catchment basins of the Broad and Catawba rivers. Areas north of Cherryville are in the Indian Creek watershed, drained by Mill Creek, Lick Fork Creek and an unnamed tributary of Indian Creek. Indian Creek is a tributary of the South Fork Catawba River, entering the river near Laboratory, North Carolina. Most of central and eastern Cherryville Township is in the Beaverdam Creek watershed, drained by the 8.4-mile (13.5 km)-long Beaverdam Creek and its 4.8-mile (7.7 km)-long tributary Little Beaverdam Creek. Beaverdam Creek is a tributary of the South Fork Catawba River, entering the river near High Shoals. The southern section of the township is in the Long Creek watershed. Long Creek flows east through Bessemer City, Dallas, and Gastonia before emptying into the South Fork Catawba River in Ranlo. Finally, a small area in the far northeastern corner of the township is in the Hoyle Creek watershed.

== Community services ==
Fire protection in unincorporated areas of the township in provided by the Hughs Pond Volunteer Fire Department (VFD) in areas northwest of Cherryville, Waco Community Fire Department (of Cleveland County) southwest of Cherryville, Crouse VFD (of Lincoln County) northeast of Cherryville, Tryonota VFD southeast of Cherryville, High Shoals VFD in the northeast corner of the township, and Agricultural Center VFD in areas along the eastern boundary of the township.

== Education ==
Most of Cherryville Township is in the Cherryville High School attendance district. Students in southern parts of the township go to Bessemer City High School and far eastern parts to North Gaston High School in Dallas

== Religious life ==
Saint Mark's Lutheran Church (ELCA), located about 4 miles (6.4 km) east of the City of Cherryville, is one of the oldest churches in the township and is among the older Lutheran congregations in the entire Piedmont area (and in the Lutheran Synod of North Carolina). It was originally organized in 1790 as Beaver Dam Lutheran Church and located at a site about 1 mile (1.6 km) east of the present location. The first congregants were immigrants from southern Germany. The congregation moved to its present site in 1858 and changed the church's name to St. Marks. The cemetery at the original site was restored in 1992.

Mount Zion Baptist Church, located 2.5 miles (4.0 km) northwest of Cherryville, is the oldest Baptist church in the township. It was organized on October 7, 1857. The site had been the location of a Presbyterian meeting house called Anthony's Meeting House, established on May 18, 1807. The meeting house later became an inter-denominational place of worship for Lutherans, Presbyterians, and Baptists, called Hebron Meeting House.

Other rural churches in Cherryville Township include Zion Hill Baptist Church, Oak Grove AME Zion Church, Shady Grove Baptist Church (organized in 1881), Iglesia Bautista Hispana, Creekside Community Church (Tryon), Concord United Methodist Church (Tryon), Mount Pisgah Baptist Church, Mount Beulah Baptist Church (organized 1916), Sunnyside Baptist Church, Bethel Evangelical Lutheran Church, and Landers Chapel United Methodist Church.

== Historic properties ==
Cherryville Township has three sites designated as Gaston County Historic Properties. The Tryon County Courthouse site near the Tryon Community was the location of a courthouse at the time of the American Revolution. Bethel Lutheran Church in the eastern part of the township dates to 1893. The cemetery, school, and church building at Landers Chapel United Methodist Church in the northeastern part of the township date to 1875, 1912, and 1925, respectively.
