= Gastonia Township, Gaston County, North Carolina =

Gastonia Township
- Township
- Interactive map of Gastonia Township
- Coordinates: 35°15′49″N 81°11′16″W
- Country: United States
- State: North Carolina
- County: Gaston

Government
  - Type: Township

Area
  - Total: 70.7 sq mi (183.2 km^{2})
  - Land: 70.5 sq mi (182.5 km^{2})
  - Water: 0.31 sq mi (0.8 km^{2})

Population (2020)
  - Total: 92,587
  - Density: 1,314/sq mi (507.3/km^{2})

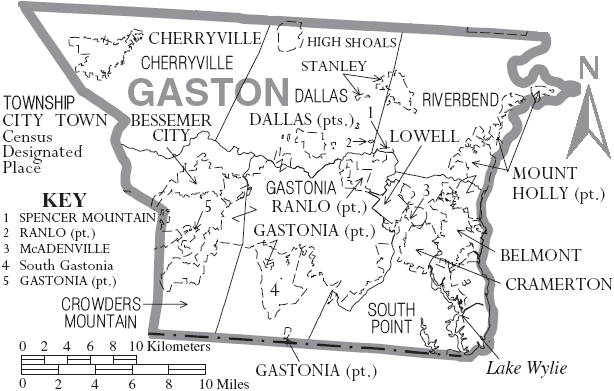
Map of Gaston County (Gastonia Township at the center, in the southern half)

Gastonia Township is a township in south-central Gaston County, North Carolina, United States, bordering South Carolina.

== Demographics ==
Historical population
| Census | Pop. | Note | %± |
|---|---|---|---|
| 2000 | 82,530 | | — |
| 2010 | 85,249 | | 3.3% |
| 2020 | 92,587 | | 8.6% |
U.S. Decennial Census

According to the 2010 Census, 85,249 people lived in the township, the most populated in the county:

- 70,044 live in parts of incorporated localities:
  - the vast majority of the county seat Gastonia,
  - the whole population of Ranlo, and
  - minor parts of Spencer Mountain and Lowell
- 15,205 live in unincorporated places, such as South Gastonia
