= South Point Township, Gaston County, North Carolina =

Coordinates: 35°14′36″N 81°04′22″W

- Township
- Interactive map of South Point Township, Gaston County, North Carolina
- Country: United States
- State: North Carolina
- County: Gaston

Area
  - Total: 62.2 sq mi (161.2 km^{2})
  - Land: 57.8 sq mi (149.8 km^{2})
  - Water: 4.4 sq mi (11.3 km^{2})

Population (2020)
  - Total: 48,410
  - Density: 837/sq mi (323.2/km^{2})

South Point Township is a township in southeastern Gaston County, North Carolina, United States. It is represented on the Gaston County Board of Commissioners by Ronnie Worley of Cramerton. As of the 2010 census it had a population of 40,484.

Incorporated communities in South Point Township are Belmont, Cramerton, McAdenville, Lowell, southern Mount Holly, and southeastern Gastonia. The township also includes the unincorporated area of Brown Town.

Fire protection in unincorporated areas of the township is provided by Community Volunteer Fire Department (Station 32) in the north, Union Road VFD (Station 51) in the southwest, New Hope Fire Department (Station 50) in the south-central, and South Point VFD (Station 42) in the southeast.

Most of South Point Township is in the South Point High School attendance district. Students in western parts of the township go to Forestview High School, northwestern parts to Ashbrook High School, and far northern parts to East Gaston High School. Many of the students from all around the township go to Stuart W. Cramer High School

Attractions in southern unincorporated South Point Township include the Daniel Stowe Botanical Garden and Carolina Speedway.

Historical population
Census	Pop.	Note	%±
2000	35,271		—
2010	40,484		14.8%
2020	48,410		19.6%
U.S. Decennial Census
