= Riverbend Township, Gaston County, North Carolina =

Coordinates: 35.3435378°N 81.0533854°W

- Township
- Interactive map of Riverbend Township, Gaston County, North Carolina
- Country: United States
- State: North Carolina
- County: Gaston

Area
  - Total: 58.5 sq mi (151.6 km^{2})
  - Land: 56.3 sq mi (145.9 km^{2})
  - Water: 2.2 sq mi (5.7 km^{2})

Population (2020)
  - Total: 30,042
  - Density: 533/sq mi (205.9/km^{2})

Riverbend Township is a township in northeastern Gaston County, North Carolina, United States. As of the 2010 census, it had a population of 26,596.

It contains the northern portion of the city of Mount Holly, most of the town of Stanley, and a small portion of the town of Spencer Mountain, as well as the unincorporated communities of Mountain Island and Lucia.

Historical population
Census	Pop.	Note	%±
2000	22,872		—
2010	26,596		16.3%
2020	30,042		13.0%
U.S. Decennial Census
