= Gaston County, North Carolina =

County in North Carolina, United States

- County
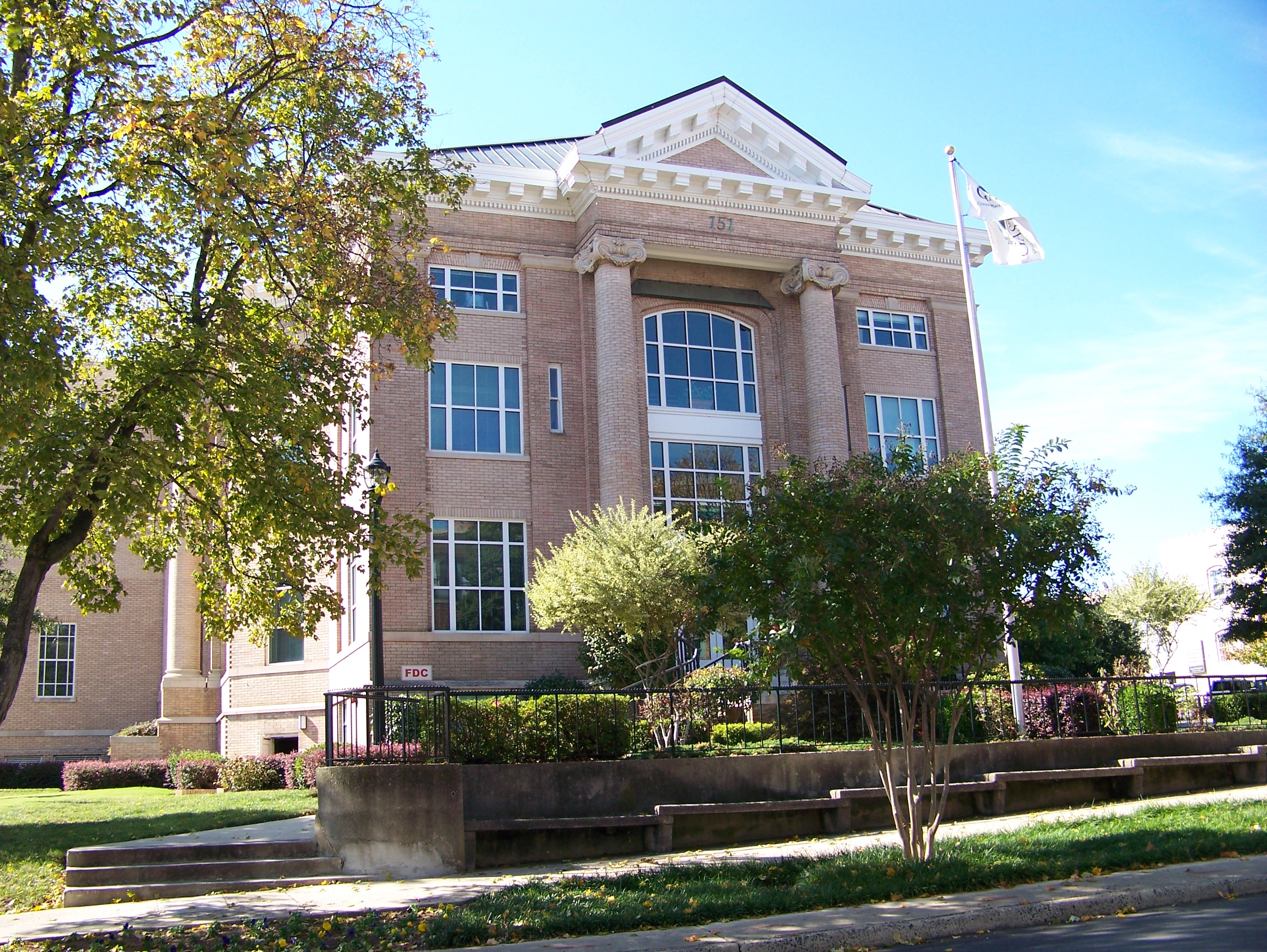
- Gaston County Courthouse

- Flag Seal Logo
- Motto: "Local Strengths. Global Success."
- Location within the U.S. state of North Carolina
- Interactive map of Gaston County, North Carolina
- Coordinates: 35.29°N 81.18°W
- Country: United States
- State: North Carolina
- Founded: 1846
- Named for: William Gaston
- Seat: Gastonia
- Largest community: Gastonia

Area
  - Total: 363.68 sq mi (941.9 km^{2})
  - Land: 355.75 sq mi (921.4 km^{2})
  - Water: 7.93 sq mi (20.5 km^{2}) 2.18%

Population (2020)
  - Total: 227,943
  - Estimate (2025): 246,558 ▲
  - Density: 640.74/sq mi (247.39/km^{2})
- Time zone: UTC−5 (Eastern)
  - Summer (DST): UTC−4 (EDT)
- Congressional district: 14th
- Website: www.gastongov.com

Gaston County is a county in the U.S. state of North Carolina. As of the 2020 census, the population was 227,943. The county seat is Gastonia. Dallas served as the original county seat from 1846 until 1911.

Gaston County is included in the Charlotte-Concord-Gastonia, NC-SC Metropolitan Statistical Area, which had an estimated population of 2,805,115 in 2023. The county is located in the southern Piedmont region.

Of North Carolina's 100 counties, Gaston County ranks 74th in size, consisting of approximately 364 square miles (940 km^{2}), and is tenth in population. The county has fifteen incorporated towns. In addition to fifteen incorporated towns and cities, there are several unincorporated communities such as Hardin, Lucia, Crowders Mountain, Sunnyside, Alexis, Tryon, and North Belmont.

== History ==
The earliest European settlers of Gaston County were principally Scots Irish, Pennsylvania Dutch, and English. In the 1750s, Dutch settler James Kuykendall with Robert Leeper, and others constructed a Fort at the Point at the junction of the Catawba and South Fork Rivers. The fort was built because of ongoing hostilities with the Cherokee, but it was apparently never attacked. Tensions between the settlers and the Native American inhabitants (primarily of the Catawba tribe) were eased considerably when the boundary dispute between North Carolina and South Carolina was settled in 1772, after which most of the Catawba settled on a reservation near Fort Mill, South Carolina.

Most early farms in the area were small, cultivated primarily by white yeoman farmers of English ancestry. North Carolina's colonial policy restricted the size of land grants, and in Gaston County they tended to be about 400 acres (1.6 km^{2}) each. One of the earliest grants in the area was given to Captain Samuel Cobrin, commander of a local militia company, on September 29, 1750.

Gaston County was founded in 1846, partitioned from Lincoln County. It is named for William Gaston, a U.S. Representative from North Carolina and member of the state supreme court.

Between 1845 and 1848, Gaston County experienced an industrial boom. During this three-year period, the first three cotton mills in the county were established. Some sources claim that the first one was established by Thomas R. Tate on Mountain Island, near the present site of Duke Energy's Mountain Island Dam and Hydroelectric Station. Other sources say that the first mill was established by the Linebergers and others on the South Fork River near McAdenville. Most sources agree that among the first three mills in operation in the county was the Stowesville Mill, founded by Jasper Stowe and associates in the South Point Community south of Belmont. Gaston County still leads all other counties in the country both in the number of spindles in operation and in the number of bales of cotton consumed.

The county seat moved from Dallas to Gastonia in 1911.

== Geography ==
According to the U.S. Census Bureau, the county has a total area of 363.68 square miles (941.9 km^{2}), of which 355.75 square miles (921.4 km^{2}) is land and 7.93 square miles (20.5 km^{2}) (2.18%) is water. It belongs to the southern Piedmont physiographic province.

Most of Gaston County is in the drainage basin of the Catawba River, except for small areas along the western edge of the county which are in the basin of the Broad River. Both the Catawba and Broad Rivers are in the greater Santee River basin. The Catawba forms the eastern border of the county and much of the central part of the county is in the drainage basin of its right tributary, the South Fork Catawba River. The county is located in the Piedmont region of central North Carolina, which consists of gently rolling terrain frequently broken by hills, river and creek valleys, and low, isolated mountain ridges. The highest point in Gaston County is King's Pinnacle, a rocky monadnock which sharply rises over 800 feet (240 m) above the city of Gastonia. King's Pinnacle rises 1,690 feet (520 m) above sea level, and is part of Crowders Mountain State Park.

=== State and local protected areas/sites ===
- Crowders Mountain State Park
- Daniel Stowe Botanical Garden
- Mountain Island Educational State Forest (part)
- Seven Oaks Preserve Trail

=== Major water bodies ===
- Beaverdam Creek
- Catawba Creek
- Catawba River
- Crowders Creek
- Dutchmans Creek
- Little Beaverdam Creek
- Mountain Island Lake
- Rankin Lake
- South Crowders Creek
- South Fork Catawba River
- South Stanly Creek
- Stanly Creek

=== Adjacent counties ===
- Lincoln County – north
- Mecklenburg County – east
- York County, South Carolina – south
- Cleveland County – west

== Demographics ==
Historical population
Census	Pop.	Note	%±
1850	8,073		—
1860	9,307		15.3%
1870	12,602		35.4%
1880	14,254		13.1%
1890	17,764		24.6%
1900	27,903		57.1%
1910	37,063		32.8%
1920	51,242		38.3%
1930	78,093		52.4%
1940	87,531		12.1%
1950	110,836		26.6%
1960	127,074		14.7%
1970	148,415		16.8%
1980	162,568		9.5%
1990	175,093		7.7%
2000	190,365		8.7%
2010	206,086		8.3%
2020	227,943		10.6%
2025 (est.)	246,558	▲	8.2%
U.S. Decennial Census; 1790–1960 1900–1990; 1990–2000 2010 2020

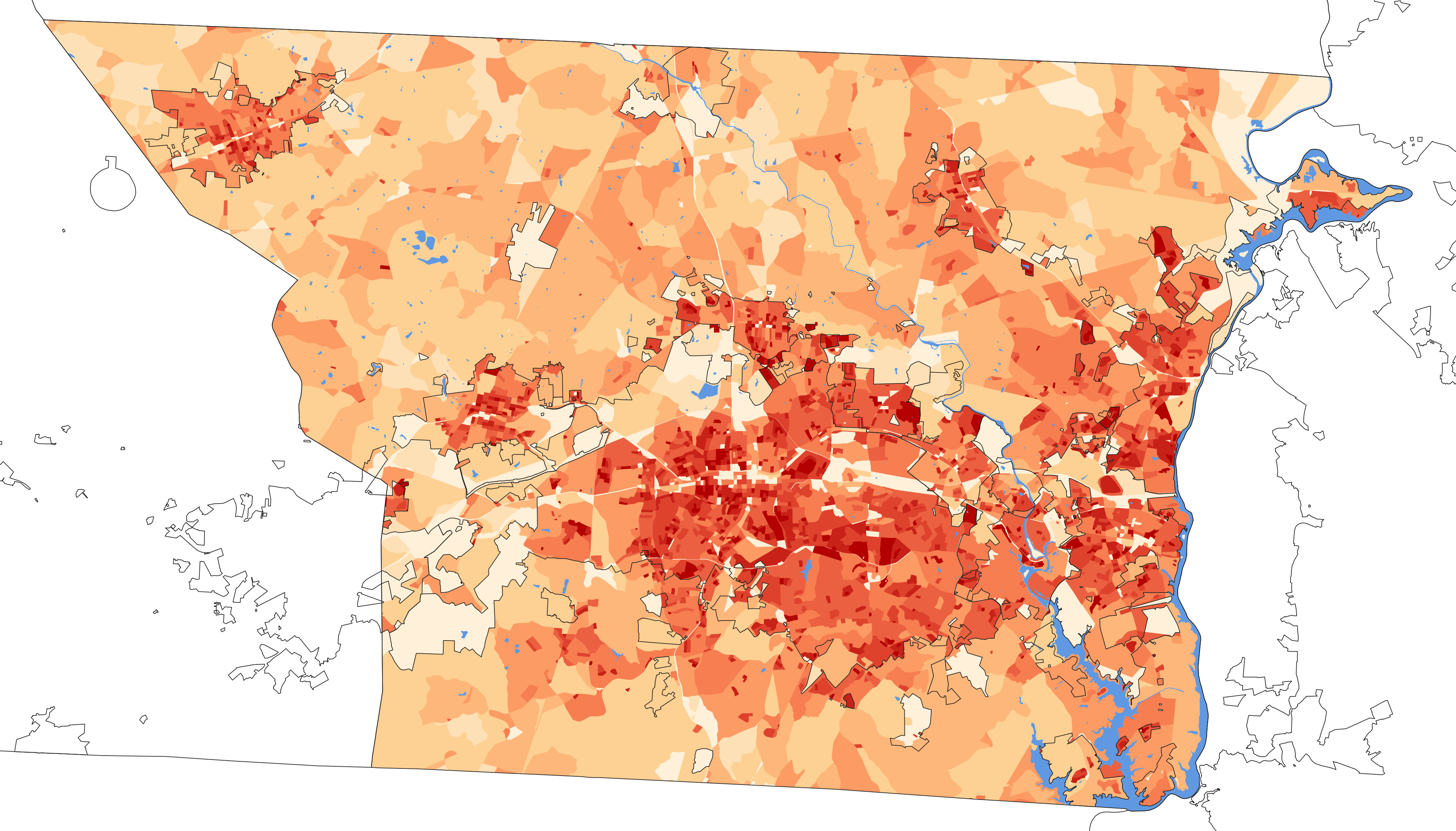
2020 population density of Gaston County NC by census block

=== 2020 census ===
Gaston County, North Carolina – Racial and ethnic composition Note: the US Census treats Hispanic/Latino as an ethnic category. This table excludes Latinos from the racial categories and assigns them to a separate category. Hispanics/Latinos may be of any race.
Race / Ethnicity (NH = Non-Hispanic)	Pop 1980	Pop 1990	Pop 2000	Pop 2010	Pop 2020	% 1980	% 1990	% 2000	% 2010	% 2020
White alone (NH)	141,121	150,295	154,922	156,310	153,653	86.81%	85.84%	81.38%	75.85%	67.41%
Black or African American alone (NH)	19,701	22,602	25,843	31,002	39,762	12.12%	12.91%	13.58%	15.04%	17.44%
Native American or Alaska Native alone (NH)	259	380	495	707	753	0.16%	0.22%	0.26%	0.34%	0.33%
Asian alone (NH)	339	896	1,802	2,462	3,509	0.21%	0.51%	0.95%	1.19%	1.54%
Native Hawaiian or Pacific Islander alone (NH)	x	x	42	44	59	x	x	0.02%	0.02%	0.03%
Other race alone (NH)	157	56	156	273	844	0.10%	0.03%	0.08%	0.13%	0.37%
Mixed race or Multiracial (NH)	x	x	1,386	3,087	9,295	x	x	0.73%	1.50%	4.08%
Hispanic or Latino (any race)	991	864	5,719	12,201	20,068	0.61%	0.49%	3.00%	5.92%	8.80%
Total	162,568	175,093	190,365	206,086	227,943	100.00%	100.00%	100.00%	100.00%	100.00%

As of the 2020 census, there were 227,943 people and 55,868 families residing in the county. The median age was 40.7 years, 22.0% of residents were under the age of 18, and 17.1% were 65 years of age or older; there were 93.3 males for every 100 females and 90.4 males for every 100 females age 18 and over.

The racial makeup of the county was 68.8% White, 17.7% Black or African American, 0.5% American Indian and Alaska Native, 1.6% Asian, <0.1% Native Hawaiian and Pacific Islander, 4.8% from some other race, and 6.6% from two or more races. Hispanic or Latino residents of any race comprised 8.8% of the population.

81.1% of residents lived in urban areas, while 18.9% lived in rural areas.

There were 90,799 households in the county, of which 30.6% had children under the age of 18 living in them. Of all households, 45.6% were married-couple households, 18.4% were households with a male householder and no spouse or partner present, and 29.1% were households with a female householder and no spouse or partner present. About 27.4% of all households were made up of individuals and 11.1% had someone living alone who was 65 years of age or older.

There were 98,136 housing units, of which 7.5% were vacant. Among occupied housing units, 65.8% were owner-occupied and 34.2% were renter-occupied. The homeowner vacancy rate was 1.6% and the rental vacancy rate was 7.8%.

=== 2004 census estimate ===
At the 2004 census estimate, there were 194,459 people, 73,936 households, and 53,307 families residing in the county. The population density was 534 people per square mile (206 people/km^{2}). There were 78,842 housing units at an average density of 221 units per square mile (85 units/km^{2}).

The racial makeup of the county was 83% White, 13.9% Black or African American, 0.3% Native American, 1% Asian, 0% Pacific Islander, 0.3% from other races, and 1% from two or more races. 3.00% of the population were Hispanic or Latino of any race.

There are 92,094 males and 98,271 females in Gaston County. Of these 39,492 are under 15, 23,082 are aged 16–24, 59,096 are aged 25–44, 44,710 are aged between 45–64 and 23,985 are 65 and over. The median age is 36.89 years.

The median income for a household in the county was $39,482, and the median income for a family was $46,271. Males had a median income of $33,542 versus $23,876 for females. The per capita income for the county was $19,225. About 8.30% of families and 10.90% of the population were below the poverty line, including 14.50% of those under age 18 and 11.10% of those age 65 or over.

== Law and government ==
Gaston County is governed by a seven-member Board of Commissioners. Two members are elected from Gaston Township and one each from the other five townships of Gaston County. They are elected on a partisan basis to four-year staggered terms. Those that file for a particular seat must live in the township. However, the vote is countywide or "at-large."

The offices of Sheriff, District Attorney, Clerk of Superior Court, and Register of Deeds are also elected offices, elected on a countywide, partisan basis. Gaston County currently is divided into forty-six (46) voting precincts.

The county is administered by a full-time professional County Manager. Gaston County is a member of the regional Centralina Council of Governments.

=== County Offices ===
==== Board of Commissioners ====
Holder	Township	Party	Term expires
Chad Brown (chairman)	Riverbend	Republican	December 2026
Cathy Cloninger (Vice Chair)	Dallas	Republican	December 2026
Jim Bailey	South Point	Republican	December 2028
Allen Fraley	Cherryville	Republican	December 2028
Bob Hovis	Crowders Mountain	Republican	December 2028
Tom Keigher	Gastonia	Republican	December 2026
Scott Shehan	Gastonia	Republican	December 2028

Gaston County is governed by a seven-member Board of Commissioners (BOC) representing six townships. Commissioners are elected on a countywide or "at-large" partisan basis to four-year staggered terms but must reside in their respective Township. The Gastonia Township is represented by two Commissioners. In December of each year, the Board elects a Chairman and Vice-Chairman to serve for the upcoming year.

==== Board of Education ====
District	Holder	Party	Term expires
At-Large	Dot Cherry	non-partisan	2026
At-Large	Jeff Ramsey	non-partisan	2028
Cherryville	Robbie Lovelace	non-partisan	2028
Crowders Mountain	Brent Moore	non-partisan	2028
Dallas	Josh Crisp	non-partisan	2026
Gastonia	Janna Smith	non-partisan	2028
Gastonia	Lee Dedmon	non-partisan	2026
Riverbend	A.M. Stephens, III	non-partisan	2026
South Point	Tod Kinlaw	non-partisan	2026

==== Soil & Water Conservation District Board Members ====
Holder	Elected or Appointed	Party	Term expires
Bill Ward (Chair)	Appointed	non-partisan	December 2026
Dan Brandon (Vice Chair)	Elected	non-partisan	December 2026
Lee McConnell (Secretary/Treasurer)	Elected	non-partisan	December 2028
David Freeman	Appointed	non-partisan	
Roger Hurst	Elected	non-partisan	

==== Other County Offices ====
Office	Holder	Party	Term expires
Sheriff	Chad Hawkins	Republican	2026
Register of Deeds	Jonathan Fletcher	Republican	2028
District Attorney	Travis G. Page	Republican	2026
County Manager	Matt Rhoten		Appointed
County Attorney	David Goldberg		Appointed

These officials other than manager and attorney serve four year terms.

=== Judicial ===
==== District Court ====
District Court Seat	Holder	Party	Term expires
Seat 1	Vacant		
Seat 2	Gus Anthony	Republican	2026
Seat 3	Donald Rice	Republican	2028
Seat 4	Holden B. Clark	Republican	2028
Seat 5	Angela G. Hoyle (Chief Judge)	Republican	2028
Seat 6	Ed Bogle	Republican	2028
Seat 7	Megan Shepard	Republican	2028

District Court judges serve four-year terms.

==== Superior Court ====
Office	Holder	Party	Term expires
Senior Resident Superior Court Judge	David Phillips	Democratic	2026
Superior Court Judge	Justin Davis	Republican	2030
Superior Court Judge	Craig Collins	Republican	2032
Superior Court Judge	William Stetzer	Republican	Appointed
Clerk of Superior Court	K. Roxann Rankin	Republican	2026

Superior court judges serve eight-year terms.

=== North Carolina General Assembly ===
==== North Carolina Senate ====
District	Representative	Party	Term expires
43	Brad Overcash	Republican	2027
44	Ted Alexander	Republican	2027

Gaston County is represented by the 43rd and 44th state senate district, and senators are up every two years.

==== North Carolina House of Representatives ====
District	Representative	Party	Term expires
108	John A. Torbett	Republican	2027
109	Donnie Loftis	Republican	2027
110	Kelly Hastings	Republican	2027

Gaston County is represented by the 108th, 109th, and 110th state house districts. Representatives are up for election every two years.

=== Federal offices ===
==== House of Representatives ====
District	Representative	Party	Term expires
14th	Tim Moore	Republican	2027

Gaston County is in the 14th congressional district, and previously, the northwest corner of the county mainly Cherryville was in the 10th until redistricting in 2023.

==== Senate ====
Senator	Party	Term expires
Ted Budd	Republican	2029
Thom Tillis	Republican	2027

=== Courts of law ===
North Carolina has a unified statewide and state-operated court system, called the General Court of Justice. It consists of three divisions: the appellate courts, the superior court, and the district courts. Only the Superior and District Courts operate at the county level.

Small claims court is a subdivision of the district court where civil cases are brought before a magistrate when the amount in controversy is $5,000 or less. There is no jury and often no lawyers. A person who loses in small claims court may appeal for a trial by jury before a judge in district court. While judges are elected, magistrates are appointed by the Senior Resident Superior Court judge upon nomination of the Clerk of Superior Court.

=== Politics ===
United States presidential election results for Gaston County, North Carolina
Year	Republican		Democratic		Third party(ies)	
Year	No.	%	No.	%	No.	%
1880	1,139	50.69%	1,107	49.27%	1	0.04%
1884	978	41.46%	1,356	57.48%	25	1.06%
1888	1,260	42.90%	1,589	54.10%	88	3.00%
1892	1,173	36.58%	1,616	50.39%	418	13.03%
1896	1,625	43.60%	2,069	55.51%	33	0.89%
1900	1,626	44.98%	1,931	53.42%	58	1.60%
1904	896	31.12%	1,958	68.01%	25	0.87%
1908	1,970	44.69%	2,398	54.40%	40	0.91%
1912	244	6.22%	2,333	59.45%	1,347	34.33%
1916	2,542	45.62%	3,019	54.18%	11	0.20%
1920	5,803	44.81%	7,148	55.19%	0	0.00%
1924	3,566	34.95%	6,554	64.24%	82	0.80%
1928	9,702	59.14%	6,702	40.86%	0	0.00%
1932	5,164	28.36%	12,890	70.78%	157	0.86%
1936	4,772	21.37%	17,555	78.63%	0	0.00%
1940	4,294	19.92%	17,262	80.08%	0	0.00%
1944	6,023	30.47%	13,744	69.53%	0	0.00%
1948	6,180	32.58%	8,966	47.27%	3,822	20.15%
1952	19,157	51.86%	17,781	48.14%	0	0.00%
1956	18,159	53.68%	15,671	46.32%	0	0.00%
1960	21,250	51.39%	20,104	48.61%	0	0.00%
1964	17,129	45.89%	20,197	54.11%	0	0.00%
1968	18,741	43.77%	10,100	23.59%	13,973	32.64%
1972	27,956	75.76%	8,462	22.93%	483	1.31%
1976	19,727	46.13%	22,878	53.50%	159	0.37%
1980	25,139	55.61%	19,016	42.07%	1,049	2.32%
1984	39,167	73.36%	14,142	26.49%	83	0.16%
1988	34,775	70.32%	14,582	29.49%	94	0.19%
1992	34,714	56.51%	19,121	31.12%	7,600	12.37%
1996	33,149	58.42%	19,458	34.29%	4,132	7.28%
2000	39,453	66.67%	19,281	32.58%	445	0.75%
2004	43,252	67.84%	20,254	31.77%	249	0.39%
2008	52,507	62.21%	31,384	37.18%	511	0.61%
2012	56,138	62.04%	33,171	36.66%	1,174	1.30%
2016	61,798	64.09%	31,177	32.33%	3,456	3.58%
2020	73,033	63.23%	40,959	35.46%	1,506	1.30%
2024	73,828	61.91%	44,062	36.95%	1,366	1.15%

In recent years, voters in most of the county have favored Republicans, though Democrats retain some electoral strength in the city of Gastonia.

== Transportation and infrastructure ==
=== Major highways ===
- I-85
- US 29
- US 74
- US 74 Bus.
- US 321
- US 321 Bus.
- NC 7
- NC 16
- NC 16 Bus. (Business route)
- NC 27
- NC 150
- NC 161
- NC 216
- NC 273
- NC 274
- NC 275
- NC 279

=== Rail service ===
Gaston County is served by Amtrak, with a stop in Gastonia. Freight rail service is provided by the Norfolk Southern Railway, CSX and Patriot Rail.

The Norfork Southern main line passes from west to east across the county, passing through Kings Mountain, Bessemer City, Gastonia, Ranlo, Lowell, Cramerton and Belmont. From Gastonia, a branch line leads south to Crowders.

CSX rail lines pass through the northwestern and northeastern corners of Gaston County. In the northwest, a line between Lincolnton and Shelby passes through Cherryville. In the northeast, a line between Lincolnton and Charlotte passes through Stanley and Mount Holly.

Progressive Rail operates state-owned trackage between Gastonia and Mount Holly with a spur extending to Belmont.

=== Airports ===
Charlotte-Douglas International Airport is a major, full-service airport with passenger flights. It is across the Catawba River in Mecklenburg County in Charlotte.

The city of Gastonia owns and operates Gastonia Municipal Airport, which is a general aviation airport with a single runway, Runway 3/21, an asphalt runway that is 3,779 feet in length.

== Economy ==
Piedmont Lithium is a mining company currently in the process of proving economic mineral recovery of lithium in Gaston County. After five years of surface prospecting, the company began drilling many sample cores in 2021 across 2,300 acres (930 ha) of land it owns or has mineral rights to the county proving economic viability of mining lithium for the boom in battery demand to support electric vehicle and other uses.

== Education ==
Public K-12 education in Gaston County is administered by the Gaston County Schools public school system, which covers the entire county. The system is governed by the nine-member Gaston County Board of Education which sets policy and establishes guidelines for school operations. Board members are elected on a nonpartisan, county wide basis, with seven representatives chosen from the six townships and two members selected at-large. Gaston County Schools has 54 public schools, including 9 high schools, 11 middle schools, 32 elementary schools, one alternative school (middle and high school age), and one separate school (Webb Street School in Gastonia) serving students ages 3 to 22 with moderate to severe disabilities.

Gaston County has four charter schools: Community Public Charter School (K-7) in Stanley, Ridgeview Charter School (K–4) in Gastonia, Piedmont Community Charter School (K–12) in Gastonia, and Mountain Island Charter School (K–12) in Mount Holly.

There are two colleges in Gaston County. Gaston College is a community college located in Dallas offering associate degree, Certificate, and Diploma programs. Belmont Abbey College is a Roman Catholic Liberal Arts College located in Belmont.

The Gaston County Public Library has 10 branches spread throughout the county.

== Natural heritage ==
Gaston County's most significant natural heritage sites are distributed across the county. They range from Crowders Mountain in the southwest corner to sites east of Stanley and at the mouth of the South Fork Catawba River.

Gaston County has twelve natural heritage sites listed as being of state or regional significance. Six of these are listed because of the presence of the bigleaf magnolia (Magnolia macrophylla). This magnificent plant has the largest simple leaf of any species in the temperate world, and one of the largest flowers. Of the 34 known sites containing bigleaf magnolias in North Carolina, 29 are in Gaston County.

Two sites are important because they provide habitat for the bog turtle (Glyptemys muhlenbergii). The bog turtle is the single most significant rare animal species surviving in Gaston County.

Crowders Mountain State Park is the largest natural heritage site in the county. It covers over 3,000 acres (12 km^{2}) of topographically, botanically, and zoologically diverse land. Six natural plant communities are found in the park, and the area supports a diversity of wildlife species. Some animals documented in the park have not been documented elsewhere in the county. A second natural heritage site, Pinnacle Road, has recently been incorporated into the park. This site is most significant for the occurrence of dwarf juniper (Juniperus communis) along its ridgeline.

The Stagecoach Road site is the largest and best preserved granitic outcrop in the county. Its thin soils are dominated by hickory species and it is also home to several smaller species such as Talinum teretifolium (fame flower), Sedum smallii (syn. Diamorpha smallii, Small's sedum), and Hypericum gentianoides (pineweed) that are found only in this type of habitat. A farm site contains an old growth forest dominated by beech, yellow poplar, oaks, and maples - some trees with diameters of nearly 3 feet (0.91 m).

Another 25 sites are listed as being of local significance. Two of these are home to extremely rare plants. Catawba Cove, near the Daniel Stowe Botanical Garden, supports a stand of Schweinitz's sunflower (Helianthus schweinitzii), a federally endangered species. The Armstrong Ford site near Belmont is the only place in western North Carolina (and one of only two sites in the state) where magnolia vine (Schisandra glabra) has been found.

== Points of interest ==
The Hoyle Historic Homestead, with notable German-American construction features, is the oldest extant structure in Gaston County. Located on the Dallas-Stanley Highway above the South Fork Catawba River, it was built around 1760 and is listed on the National Register of Historic Places.

The Daniel Stowe Conservancy covers 380 acres (1.5 km^{2}) in the South Point area of Gaston County, on South New Hope Road.

The Gaston County Museum is located in the town of Dallas, North Carolina.

The Schiele Museum of Natural History is a science museum and planetarium located in Gastonia that features both permanent and touring exhibits.

Crowder's Mountain State Park is noted for its resident raptors and sheer vertical cliffs which drop 150 feet (46 m). From Crowders Mountain, the highest point in Gaston County, views stretch for more than 20 miles (32 km).

The U.S. National Whitewater Center is a recreation and training facility. Set among 1,300 acres (5.3 km^{2}) of wooded land along the Catawba River, the multiuse facility has a climbing center, mountain-biking trails and running trails.

Christmas Town USA - McAdenville, North Carolina - Each December, the town erects a holiday display that attracts visitors who walk down Main Street to experience the holiday display.

Spencer Mountain, which is located in central Gaston County, is the site of the old WBTV television transmitter. It was from this site that the first commercial television signal in North Carolina was broadcast, when WBTV signed on the air in 1949. The tower remains on the mountain today, but is no longer in use as WBTV's primary transmitter. It is used by NWS for its NOAA Weather Radio transmission signal.

== Communities ==
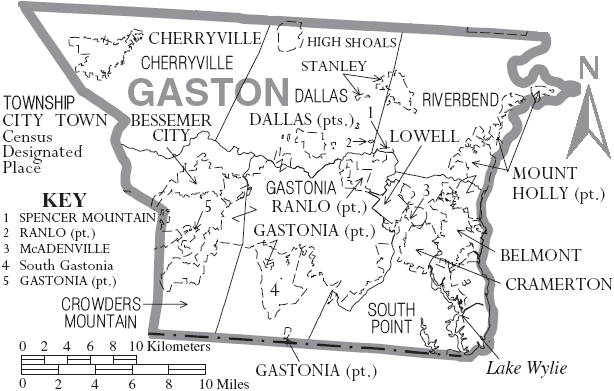
Map of Gaston County with municipal and township labels

=== Cities ===
- Belmont
- Bessemer City
- Cherryville
- Gastonia (county seat and largest community)
- Kings Mountain (mostly in Cleveland County)
- Lowell
- Mount Holly

=== Towns ===
- Cramerton
- Dallas
- Dellview (inactive)
- High Shoals
- McAdenville
- Ranlo
- Spencer Mountain (inactive)
- Stanley

=== Townships ===
Townships are administrative divisions of unincorporated county land and do not have any government function.

- Cherryville
- Crowders Mountain
- Dallas
- Gastonia
- Riverbend
- South Point

=== Census-designated places ===
- Alexis
- Springdale

=== Unincorporated communities ===
- Ashebrook Park
- Boogertown
- Brown Town
- Crowders
- Hardins
- Lucia
- Mountain Island
- Tryon

== See also ==
- List of counties in North Carolina
- National Register of Historic Places listings in Gaston County, North Carolina

== Works cited ==
- McCorkle, Mac; Salzberg, Rachel (January 2022), The Democrats' Countrypolitan Problem in North Carolina: Progressive Challenge and Opportunity, Duke University Polis: Center for Politics
