= Springdale, North Carolina =

- Census-designated place
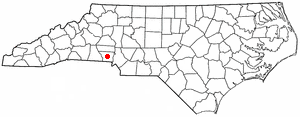
- Location in the U.S. state of North Carolina
- Coordinates: 35°17′25″N 81°08′42″W
- Country: United States
- State: North Carolina
- County: Gaston

Area
  - Total: 0.71 sq mi (1.84 km^{2})
  - Land: 0.71 sq mi (1.84 km^{2})
  - Water: 0 sq mi (0.00 km^{2})
- Elevation: 781 ft (238 m)

Population (2020)
  - Total: 1,203
  - Density: 1,696.1/sq mi (654.87/km^{2})
- Time zone: UTC-5 (Eastern (EST))
  - Summer (DST): UTC-4 (EDT)
- ZIP code: 28054
- Area code: 704
- FIPS code: 37-64050
- GNIS feature ID: 2806990

Springdale is an unincorporated community and census-designated place (CDP) in Gaston County, North Carolina, United States. It was first listed as a CDP in the 2020 census with a population of 1,203. It is bordered on the west and south by the City of Gastonia, on the east by the town of Ranlo, and on the north by the unincorporated community of Monterey Park.

== Demographics ==
Historical population
| Census | Pop. | Note | %± |
|---|---|---|---|
| 2020 | 1,203 | | — |
U.S. Decennial Census; 2020

=== 2020 census ===
Springdale CDP, North Carolina – Demographic Profile (NH = Non-Hispanic)
| Race / Ethnicity | Pop 2020 | % 2020 |
|---|---|---|
| White alone (NH) | 967 | 80.38% |
| Black or African American alone (NH) | 99 | 8.23% |
| Native American or Alaska Native alone (NH) | 2 | 0.17% |
| Asian alone (NH) | 8 | 0.67% |
| Pacific Islander alone (NH) | 0 | 0.00% |
| Some Other Race alone (NH) | 4 | 0.33% |
| Mixed Race/Multi-Racial (NH) | 51 | 4.24% |
| Hispanic or Latino (any race) | 72 | 5.99% |
| Total | 1,203 | 100.00% |

Note: the US Census treats Hispanic/Latino as an ethnic category. This table excludes Latinos from the racial categories and assigns them to a separate category. Hispanics/Latinos can be of any race.
