= Piedmont Lithium =

American mining company

- Type: Public
- Traded as: Nasdaq: PLL
- Industry: Lithium mining
- Founded: 2016
- Founders: Taso Arima; Lamont Leatherman
- Headquarters: Belmont, North Carolina, United States
- Key people: Keith Phillips (CEO)
- Products: Spodumene concentrate; Lithium chemicals (planned)
- Website: piedmontlithium.com

Piedmont Lithium is an American mining company in the process of proving economic mineral recovery of lithium at sites in North Carolina, Tennessee, Canada, and Ghana.

The company has done business deals with Tesla and is planning to invest in a $1.8 billion mine in Gaston County, North Carolina.

The Gaston County project is one of multiple projects that Piedmont Lithium is working to develop currently.

The surrounding Gaston County community is concerned that the mine will affect their water and air quality.

== Background ==
"The modern lithium-mining industry started in this North Carolina region in the 1950s, when the metal was used to make components for nuclear bombs. One of the world’s biggest lithium miners by production, Albemarle Corp, is based in nearby Charlotte. As of March 2021, nearly all of Albemarle's lithium is extracted in Australia and Chile, which have large, accessible deposits of the metal." As of 2021, just one percent of global lithium supply is both mined and processed in the United States (3,150 t (6,940,000 lb)), while 233,550 t (514,890,000 lb) is produced in Australia and Chile.

Lithium is classified as a critical mineral by the US department of energy, as “it is the major ingredient in the rechargeable batteries found in electronics”. Piedmont Lithium president and CEO Keith Phillips stated his goals with the mineral are, “to be a leading supplier of lithium resources to the growing EV [electric vehicle] and stationary storage supply chains”. The demand for lithium has shifted in turn towards consumer electronics since the beginning of the modern lithium-mining industry. This demand is only predicted to increase in the coming decades.

== History ==
Piedmont Lithium Ltd was founded as an Australian company in 2016. Cofounders included Australian financier Taso Arima and US geologist Lamont Leatherman, who raised several million dollars of seed funding to start the firm. Arima read about the prospecting work Leatherman had done in the Gaston County, North Carolina area. Leatherman had explored the area for lithium in surface rock in the late 2000s after thinking back to "the green-striped rocks in the yard of his childhood home in [the area]. The rocks contained rich veins of lithium."

== Projects ==
Elevra Lithium currently has mining related projects in Quebec, Ghana, and Gaston County, North Carolina. The projects in Quebec, dubbed “North American Lithium” and “Moblan” respectively, contain an open-pit mine and spodumene concentrator. “Ewoyaa Lithium Project,” located in Ghana, aims to open “one of Ghana’s first lithium-producing mines”. The project in Gaston County, known as “Carolina Lithium,” is set to include an open-pit mine, spodumene concentrator, and a lithium hydroxide conversion plant.

=== Carolina Lithium Project ===
The Carolina Lithium project in Gaston County is currently in development and will include a 1.2 billion dollar mine and processing plant. In preparation for the project, Piedmont Lithium began buying land, eventually accumulating to 3,600 acres. The mining project is currently in a negotiation phase as Piedmont Lithium needs to obtain air and water permits as well as a rezoning approval from Gaston County in order to continue to develop the mine. Piedmont Lithium's Gaston County project proposal predicts that “33,000 tons of lithium [will] be mined per year” and will produce “330,582 tons of greenhouse gas emissions annually," which is “equivalent to emissions from 66,000 gas-fueled passenger cars". The proposal states that the project will produce “169 tons of particulate matter” and“ 69 tons of the [particulate matter will be] PM 2.5”.

According to the proposal, the Carolina Lithium project will operate on 3,600 acres of land which Elevra will use “half [of the land] as a buffer, and the other half, [as a] mining operations proper”. The company plans to have the Carolina Lithium mining operation as both a mining site as well as spodumene processing plant, “one of the few of its kind in the United States”. The mine is predicted to be in operation for 11 years and is expected to bring in large amounts of profit for the company according to Piedmont Lithium CEO Keith Phillips.

The mine in Gaston County will be an open-pit Lithium Mine. Open-pit mines create mining waste which includes, but is not limited to thousands of tons of sulfuric acid per day as well as radioactive uranium extracts. Piedmont Lithium claimed implementation of multiple environmental risk mitigation features in their proposed mine. These features include a conveyor belt to transport blasted rock from the mine up to the processing plant and the usage of many tons of water to prevent dust from building up.

On April 15, 2024, the company obtained the final permits they needed to build the Lithium Mine. The permits were approved “despite widespread opposition from neighbors worried about water, noise pollution and other potential problems”. Currently Elevra Lithium is waiting on rezoning approval from the Gaston County Board of commissioners to begin the project.

== Community Criticism ==
=== Gaston County ===
When the Carolina Lithium mining project was proposed to the Gaston County community it was met with push back. The residents are concerned that the mine would have a significant impact on the Gaston County environment, specifically the soil quality, air quality, and municipal water quality.

Both the residents and local government of Gaston County have argued against the Carolina Lithium project. Local news station WCNC Charlotte has reported on emails between Gaston County residents, Gaston County Commissioners, and Piedmont Lithium regarding concerns about the amount of pollution the mine will produce. Here, Gaston County commissioner Allen Fraley wrote, “It certainly appears to me that PL [Piedmont Lithium] is acting in a manner this is a done deal and will get a 'rubber stamp' approval”.

In 2018, Piedmont Lithium began to approach Gaston County citizens about buying their land. Piedmont Lithium offered to buy one resident's land for a fixed price “without giving him an idea about the lithium’s actual value”. One resident, Calvin Hastings, settled on a price for his land, and reported feeling “sentimental” about losing land his family had owned for centuries. Hastings has been relocated about a dozen miles away from his former property.

Another Gaston County resident, Warren Snowdon, is leading an opposition group called “Stop Piedmont Lithium”. This organization has is made up of hundreds of Gaston County residents, leading to both vocal opposition and “no pit mine” yard signs being posted around Gaston County. Snowdon explained that "Our issue is on every front: It's water. It's air. It's light pollution. It's noise. It's traffic. Give us a wind farm. Give us a solar farm”.

One major concern of Gaston County locals is arsenic contamination. Arsenic occurs naturally in soil and bedrock, and when it is disturbed, such as during open-pit mining, it can leech into the water supply. According to residents, Gaston County already has issues with arsenic resulting from contaminated lithium mines from the late 20th century. Locke Bell, a Gaston County resident whose property borders the proposed mine, saw the plans for the project and said, “I saw these massive mines… open pits. We have enough of that around here that's toxic already”.

The National Institutes of Health states arsenic may enter the environment from “mining and smelting” related ores. They claim it is possible to intake arsenic through air or water, and that arsenic collects in the soil and in bodies of water. Arsenic is classified by the EPA as a human carcinogen, and long-term exposure is known to cause skin lesions and skin growths.

The Carolina Lithium project plans to utilize an unconfirmed number of tons of water to flush an estimated sixteen tons of hazardous air pollutants during its operation, including arsenic. This wastewater is to be held in pools for treatment before being reintegrated into the local water supply. Piedmont’s head of safety, Monique Parker, addressed the concerns surrounding arsenic, stating: “That naturally occurring arsenic comes from… volcanic rock activity in that region, so it's not there because we're mining it”.

The residents of Gaston County are also concerned about the number of disturbances they will endure if the project goes through. Piedmont’s blasting consultant, Stuart Brashear, estimated that blasts will be felt from thousands of feet away to a minor degree. He claims these blasts would not exceed twice daily, and he explained that some residents may not notice them.

In 2021, Mike Soraghan of E&E News investigated what residents had to say regarding the project. Gaston County resident Locke Bell said Gaston County has already endured hardships due to Piedmont Lithium’s testing. The heavy machinery used to drill cores on neighboring property has left the land susceptible to erosion. Bell reportedly continued there is “absolutely no protection whatsoever, you can see where it’s already silting up. This is all against the law”. Additionally, Bell explains his concerns if the project does go through. He reportedly stated, “they’re digging down 500 feet deep. Water’s gonna go into the mine. They’re gonna pump it out. They’ll pump the toxic chemicals in here and kill everything. But at first, we’ll go dry”.

Bell also claims a deeper relationship with the land. He affirms that regardless of the presence of the mine, he will not move or sell his land. He told E&E News, “I’m too old to start over. I love these woods. I can’t find it again,” Bell explained. “I don’t want the mine, but if it happens, it happens. I’m not gonna go anywhere.” Despite the proposed project, Gaston County residents continue to protest.

In August 2023 Piedmont Lithium spoke at the Gaston County Commissioners meeting in order to seek permitting approval. The Gaston County Commissioner, Allen Fraley, declined Piedmont's request for approval saying, “the door knocking should have already been done,” when the company proposed that they would go door to door to collect data on the number of residents who have private wells. Gaston County Commissioners are apprehensive towards the project. When commissioner Allen Fraley, one of the commissioners, addressed Piedmont’s head of safety Monique Parker on the arsenic concern, Parker replied, “if we find arsenic, we’ll return the water cleaner than when we found it.” Commissioner Fraley responded, “if you say so”. According to WCNC Charlotte, Fraley also “criticized the length of the mine’s expected usage by Piedmont Lithium, believing the time frame [of mine usage] is too short”.

Commission chairman Chad Brown addressed Piedmont blankly, “We’ve tried to work with you guys… this project is based on a lot of promises. This is the worst economic development rollout I’ve ever seen”. The commissioner’s office also asked Piedmont CEO Keith Phillips to attend their meeting. Phillips did not attend. Vice-Chairman Bob Hovis responded by saying, “These people have very valid concerns. I challenged the CEO to come and speak face-to-face. It’s offensive to us [that he’s not here]”.

Through these negotiations the Gaston County residents continue to “remain skeptical about disrupting the environment they live around”. In the aforementioned hearing, the commissioners “affirmed that no plans would be approved until Piedmont Lithium receives a mining permit from North Carolina”. Piedmont Lithium obtained their state mining permit on April 15, 2024. Proceeding with the Carolina Lithium project now requires rezoning of land by the Gaston County Board of Commissioners.

== Business ==
Prior to their merger with Sayona Mining, Piedmont Lithium held multiple shares and deals in the mining industry. In the summer of 2023, the at-the-time joint mine with Sayona in Quebec brought in a total of $47 million in sales and provided Piedmont with a “$22.9 million dollar profit, the first in the company’s history”. Piedmont Lithium's CEO, Keith Phillips, called the quarter of sales “transformational” for the company as stock prices rose.

In September 2020, Piedmont signed a sales agreement with Tesla to supply high-purity lithium ore for up to ten years, specifically to supply "spodumene concentrate ('SC6') from Piedmont's North Carolina deposit to Tesla."

As of early 2021, Piedmont was exploring by drilling many sample cores across 2,300 acres (930 ha) of land it owns or has mineral rights to in Gaston County that surface prospecting had previously shown to contain substantial hard rock mineral deposits in the surface rock.

With substantial demand growth for lithium occurring in the 2020s, lithium mining and production companies are growing and some are experiencing marked increases in market valuation. The stock prices of Piedmont Lithium, as well as Lithium Americas and MP Materials, increased substantially in early 2021 as a result of the increased importance of lithium to the global economy.

In March 2021, Piedmont Lithium Ltd proposed a "re-domiciliation from Australia to the United States" under which a newly formed US corporation, Piedmont Lithium Inc, would acquire the Australian Company, if approved by the shareholders of Piedmont Lithium Ltd. Shareholders approved the proposal on April 29, 2021. and the company became redomiciled as a US corporation on May 17, 2021.

The North Carolina state mining permit for the $1 billion Carolina Lithium project and its 500-foot deep mine was issued on 15 April 2024. This mining venture, promising $3.9 billion in cumulative economic output, is nearing its final stages of preparation. A US$1 million reclamation bond will need to be posted before site work can begin, and a local zoning variance will need to be issued.

=== Legal Proceedings ===
The money garnered from the Quebec mine will be going towards Piedmont's projects in Gaston County, North Carolina and Tennessee. These projects will cost the company $1.8 billion and $800 million respectively. In the Fall of 2023, Phillips said that “[Piedmont Lithium] decided not to accept a $141.7 million federal Department of Energy (DOE) grant to help pay for the Tennessee plant”. The company declined the loan because they say they need more money for the Tennessee plant. Instead, Piedmont is trying to obtain a DOE Advanced Technology Vehicle Manufacturing Loan which will give the company more money.

This mine would significantly increase Piedmont Lithium's stock which will “keep investors happy”. Piedmont's strategy is to meet the lithium mining demands of the US market and provide lithium to “automobile and battery makers” such as Tesla. The market for electric vehicles and batteries has been expanding and Piedmont plans to “ramp up production to fill that demand”.
