= Boogertown, North Carolina =

- Unincorporated community
- Location within North Carolina Location within the United States
- Coordinates: 35°13′05″N 81°09′35″W
- Country: United States
- State: North Carolina
- County: Gaston
- Elevation: 784 ft (239 m)
- Time zone: UTC-5 (Eastern (EST))
  - Summer (DST): UTC-4 (EDT)
- Area code: 704
- GNIS feature ID: 1019253

Boogertown is an unincorporated community in Gaston County, North Carolina, United States.

Moonshiners who warned that the bogeyman lurked in the forest in order to deter visitors caused the name Boogertown to be selected.
