= Schiele Museum of Natural History =

Natural history museum in Gastonia, North Carolina

Coordinates: 35.2532°N 81.1583°W

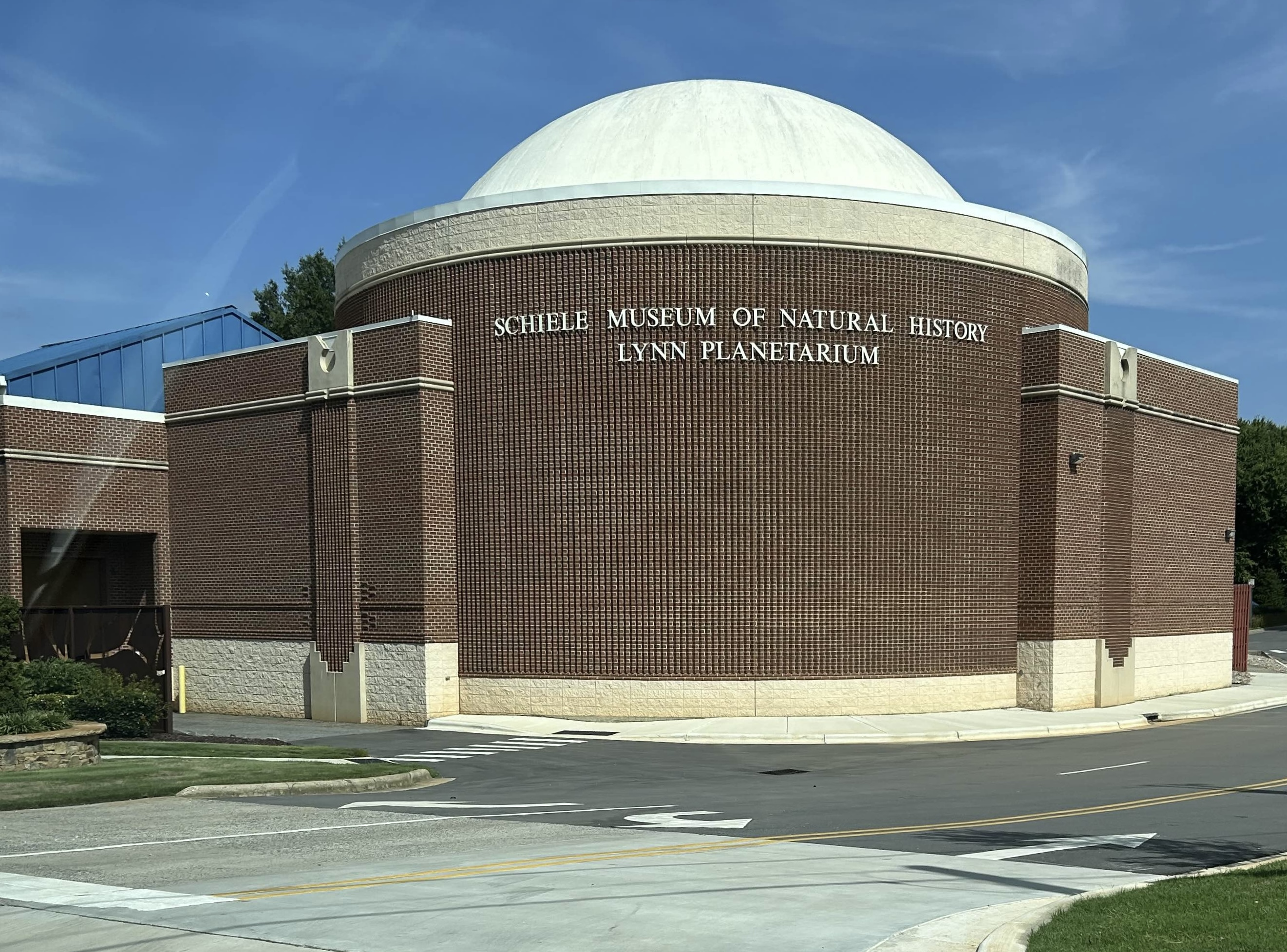
- Established: July 24, 1961
- Location: 1500 E. Garrison Blvd. Gastonia, North Carolina, US
- Type: Natural history museum
- Founder: Bud Schiele; Lilly Schiele
- Website: www.schielemuseum.org

The Schiele Museum of Natural History is a natural history museum in Gastonia, North Carolina. The museum's exhibits consist primarily of life science specimens, including several fossil casts, dioramas, and live animals. It hosts one of the largest collections of Catawba Indian pottery in the world.

== History ==
The museum was founded by Bud and Lily Schiele on July 24, 1961, as the Gaston County Museum of Natural History, taking its current name three years later. Most of the early exhibits were directly donated from the Schiele's collections of wildlife, rocks and minerals, and Native American pottery and jewelry. Over the years, the museum grew from a one-room building on two acres, to hosting 19 buildings in 1998, and had an attendance of 720,000 during the 1977-78 fiscal year. In 2001, the museum became a Smithsonian Affiliate.

In 2023, the museum announced its replacement of its central T. rex exhibit, nicknamed Wankel, with a Quetzalcoatlus.

== Collection ==
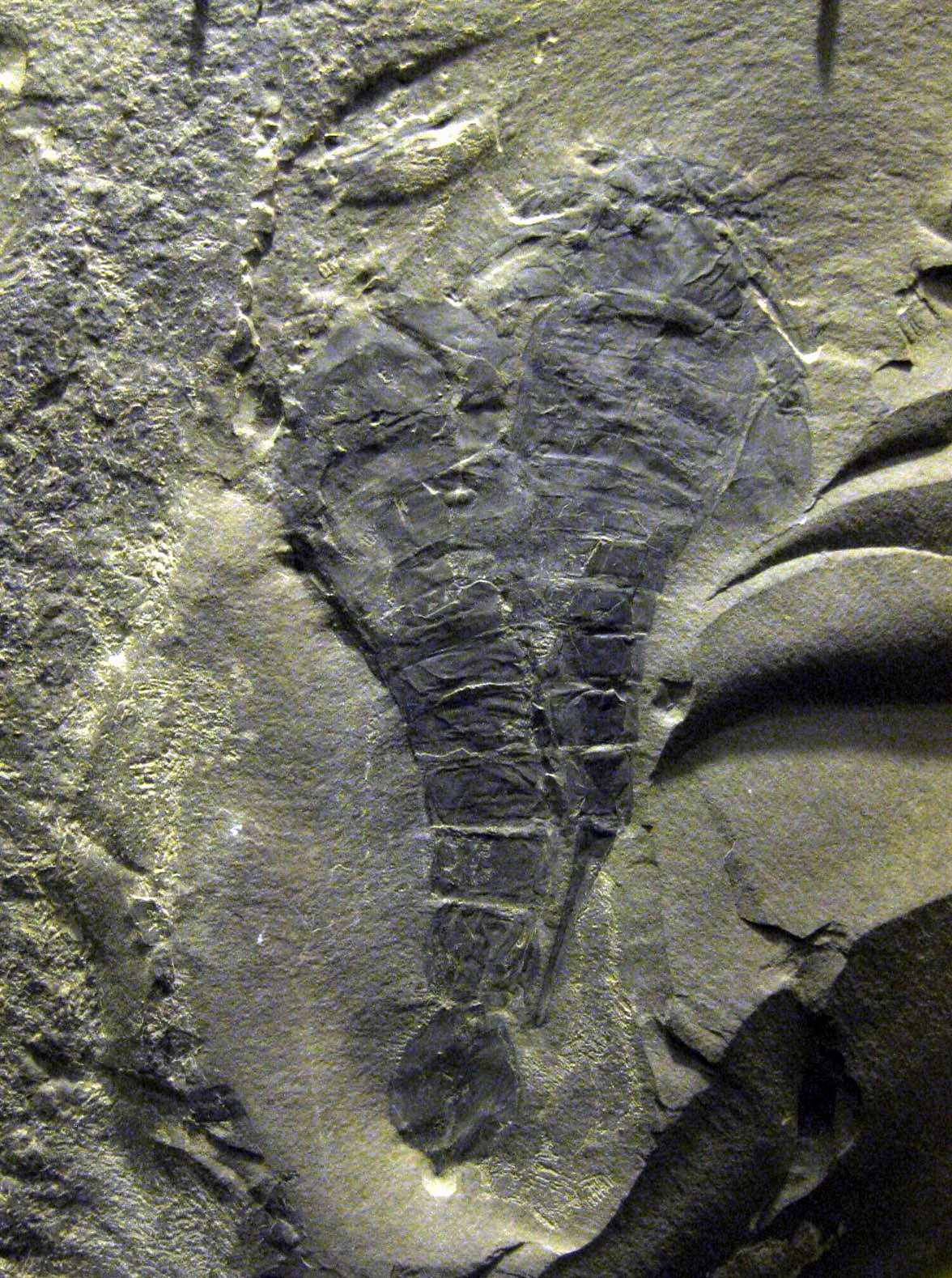
Fossil of Acutiramus cummingsi and Eurypterus remipes on display at the Schiele Museum of Natural History.

The museum's collections include one of the largest collections of Catawba Indian pottery in the world, the largest collection of mounted land animals in the Southeast, and several fossil and wildlife displays. Several exhibits feature both taxidermied and live animals, such as farm animals, reptiles, and an opossum. Many of these animals are sourced from animal rehabilitation centers.

== Exhibitions ==
The museum has a number of both permanent and temporary exhibits and galleries. It is home to the James H. Lynn Planetarium along with the Hall of North American Habitats, The Hall of North American Wildlife, The Hall of North Carolina Natural History, and the Henry Hall of the American Indian.

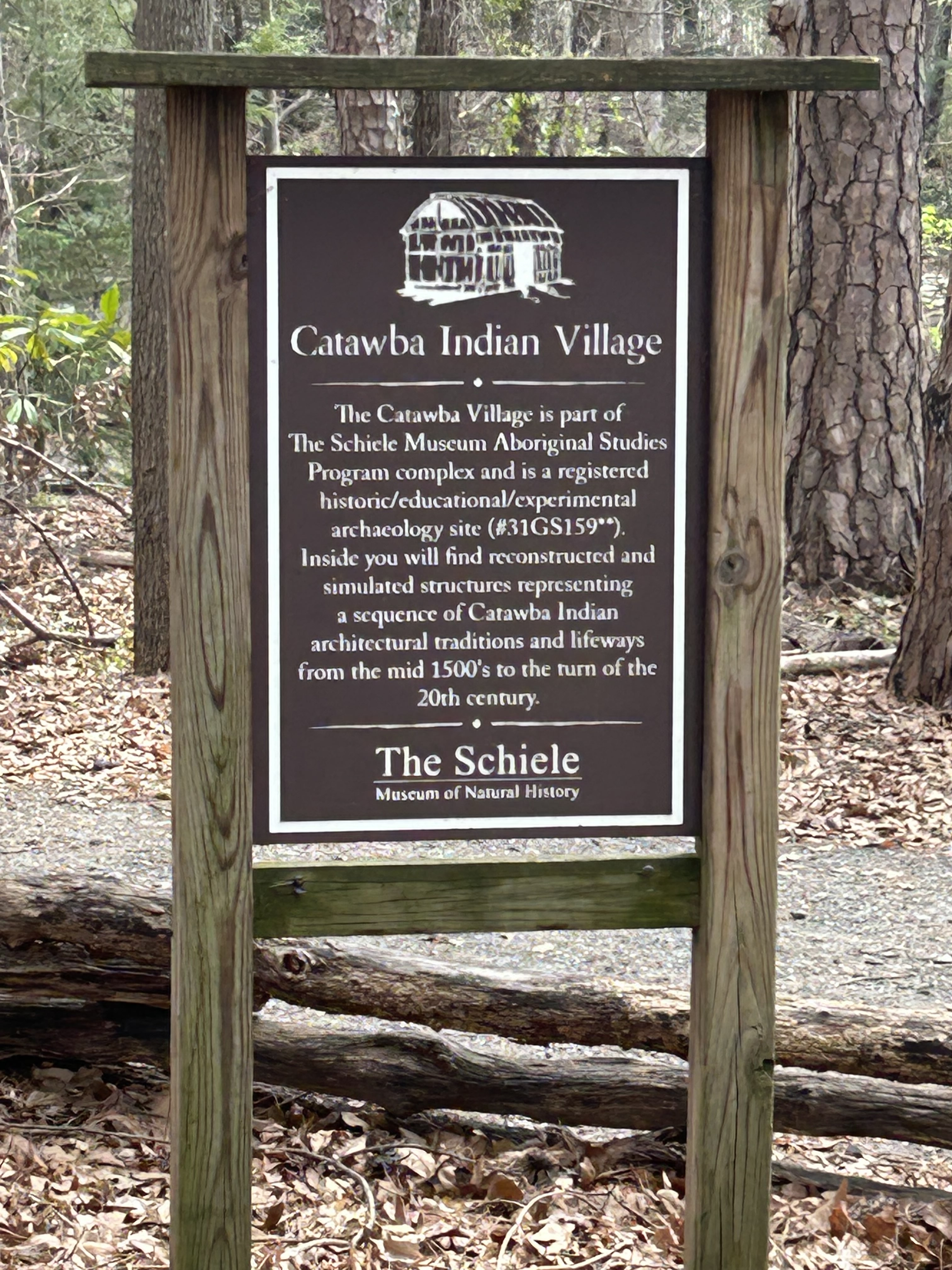
Sign at the entrance to the Catawba Indian Village exhibit.

Various exhibitions are also outside on the museum's grounds, including a nature trail, The Farm, and a replica Catawba Indian Village.

== Location and property ==
The museum is located at 1500 E. Garrison Blvd., Gastonia, North Carolina, neighboring Grier Middle School. It is located on 16.57 acres of property, with the main building itself having a square footage of approximately 4320 ft^{2}.

The courtyard at the entrance of the building features the statue Aspiration to Flight by Tom Tischler, sculpted in 1989 and installed on the property in January 1990.

== Gallery ==
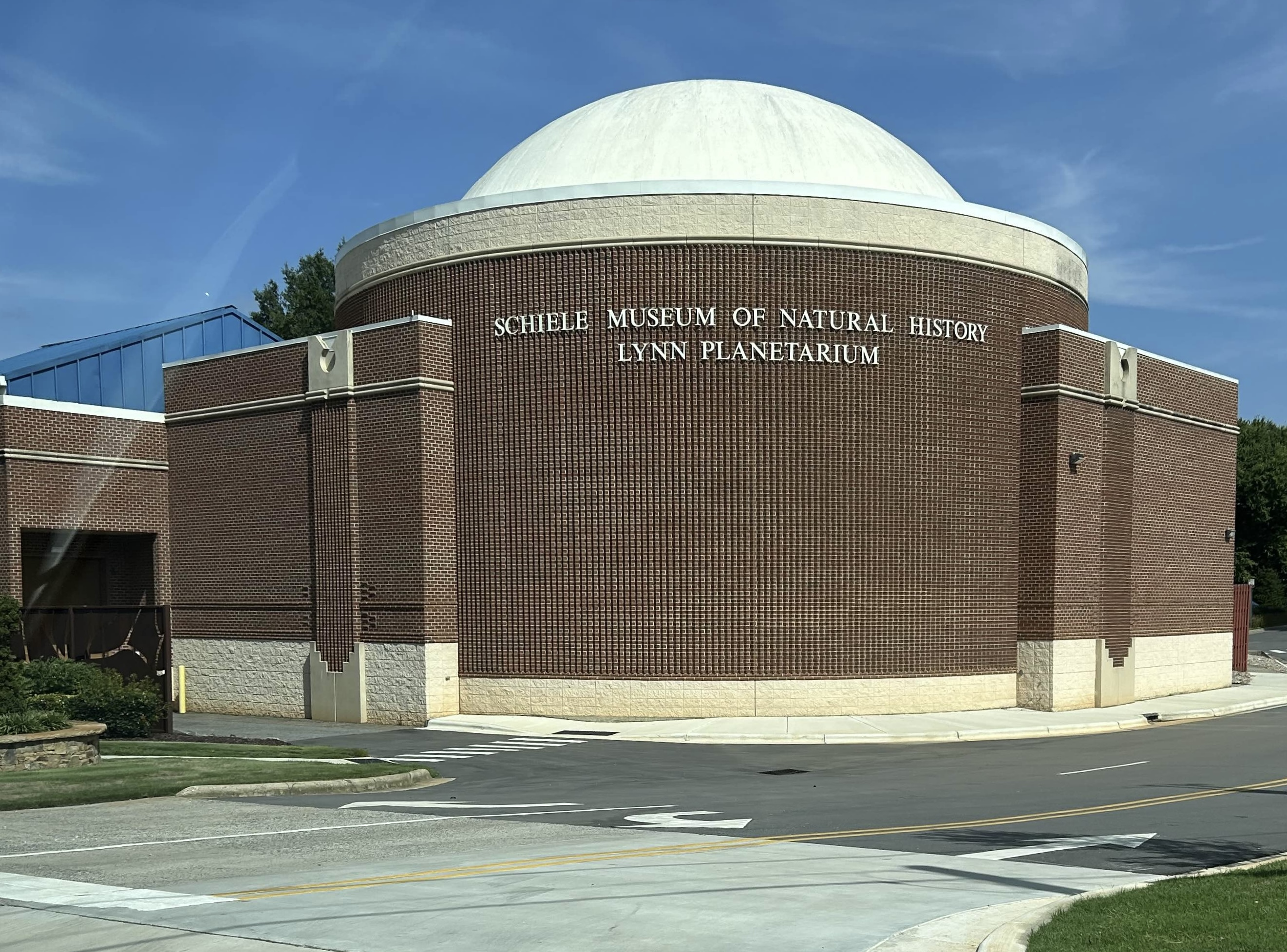
Exterior of the James H. Lynn Planetarium.

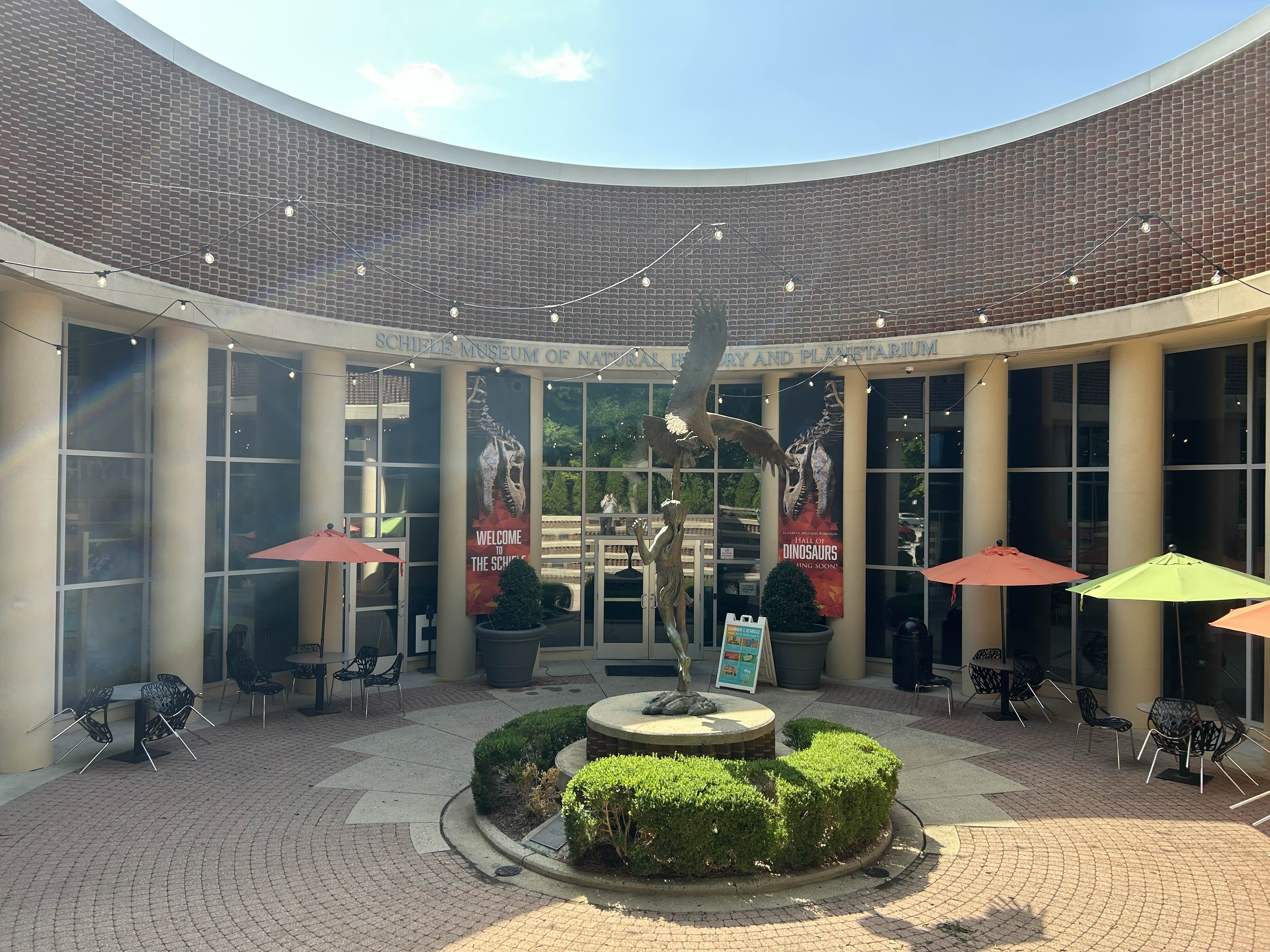
Courtyard at the entrance to the museum.

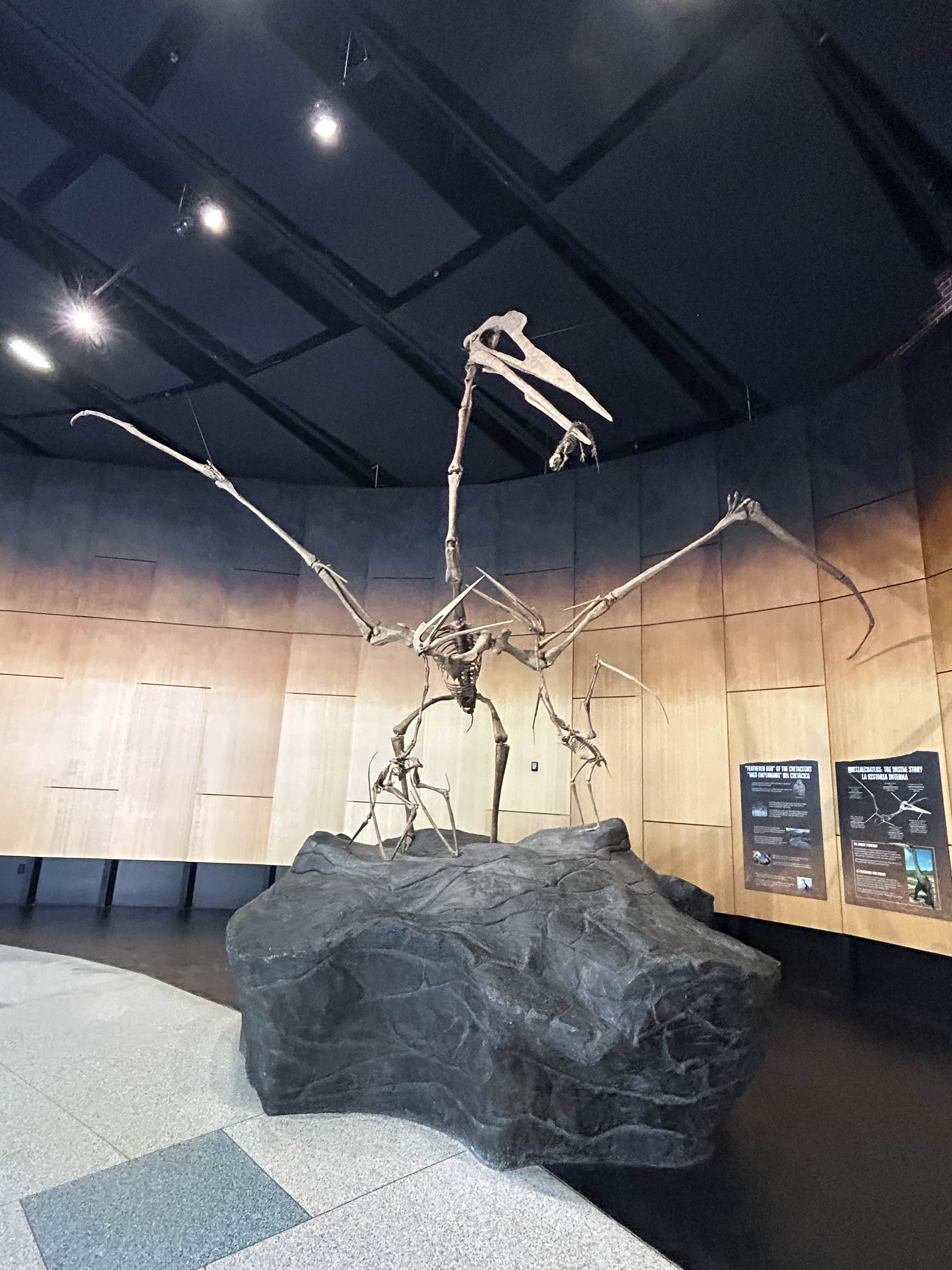
Quetzalcoatlus fossil casting at the main entrance.

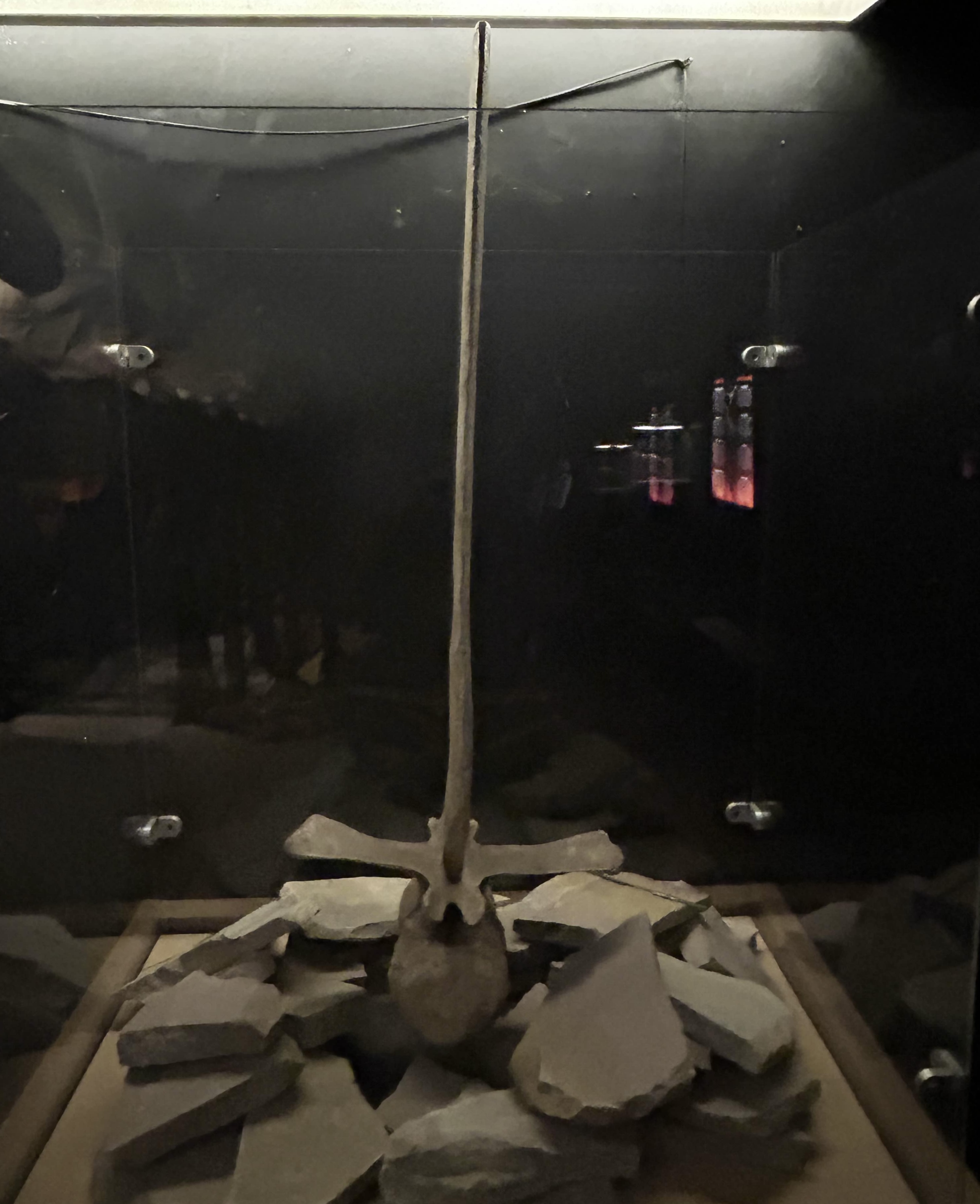
Fossil cast of a Spinosaurus vertebrae.

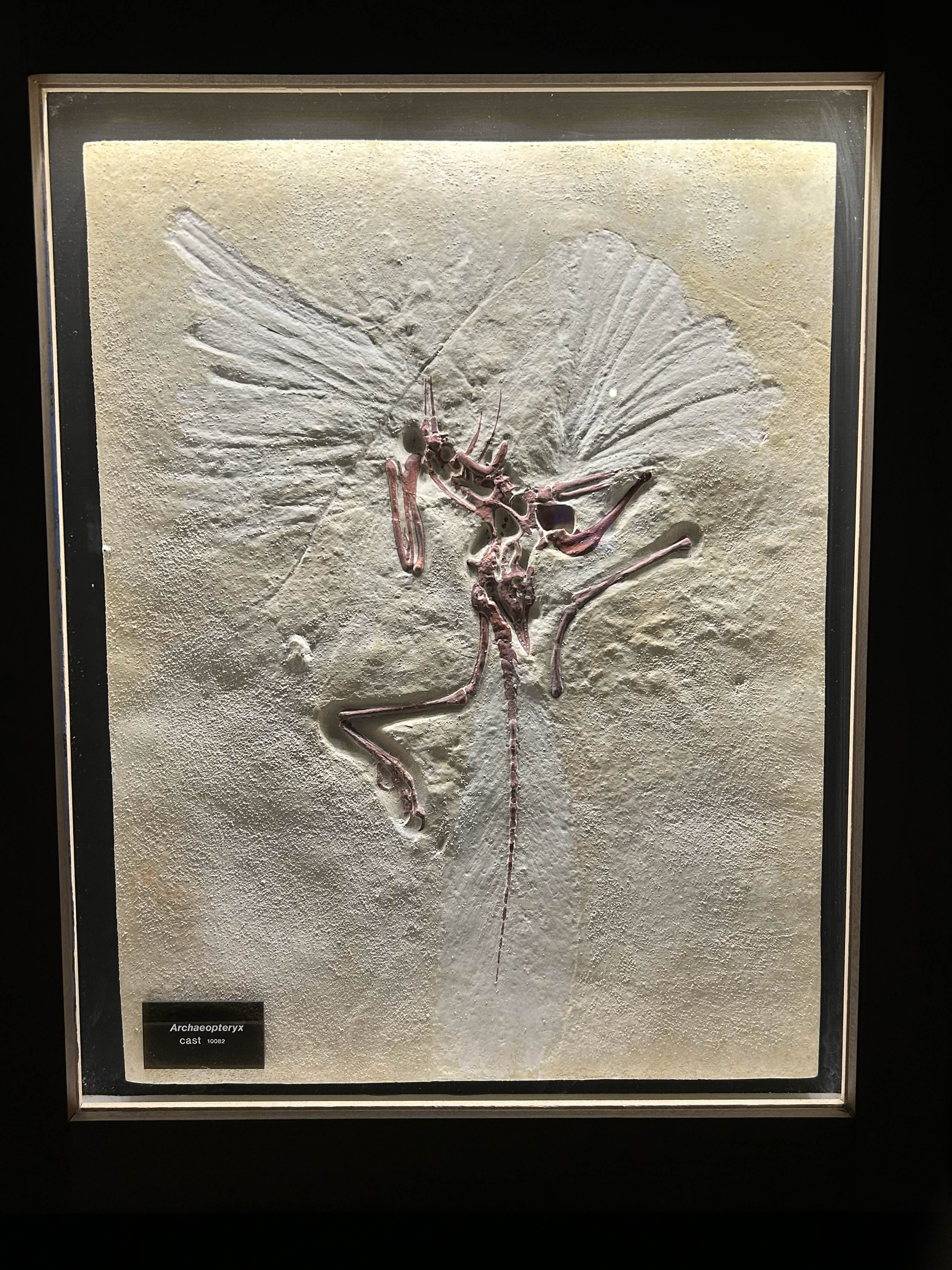
Archaeopteryx fossil cast.

== See also ==
- Daniel Stowe Conservancy
- List of museums in North Carolina
