= Mountain Island Lake =

Lake in North Carolina, United States

- View of Mountain Island Lake

- Location within North Carolina Location within the United States
- Location: Gaston / Mecklenburg counties, North Carolina, United States
- Coordinates: 35°21′50″N 80°56′22″W
- Primary inflows: Catawba River
- Basin countries: United States
- Surface area: 3,281 acres (13 km^{2})
- Shore length^{1}: 61 miles (98 km)
- Surface elevation: 647.5 feet (197 m)
- Islands: Mountain Island
- ^{1} Shore length is not a well-defined measure.

Mountain Island Lake is a lake northwest of Charlotte, North Carolina created in 1924 to coincide with the building of Mountain Island Hydroelectric Station. It is named after the mountain which appears as an island in the lake, and the surrounding area is identified by the lake's name. The shape of the lake follows the meander of the Catawba River's course, dammed near the Mount Holly Wastewater Plant. Full pond elevation is approximately 647.5 feet (197 m). The lake has around 3,281 acres (13 km^{2}) of surface area and 61 miles (98 km) of shoreline.

Riverbend Steam Station on Mountain Island Lake

== River, water, and lake access ==
Mountain Island Lake is fed by the Catawba River, and is the smallest of the three man-made lakes that border Mecklenburg County, North Carolina (Lake Norman, and Lake Wylie). Mountain Island Lake is managed by Charlotte-based company Duke Energy. The primary function of Mountain Island Lake is to provide drinking water for over 1 million residents of Charlotte and surrounding Mecklenburg County, as well as Mount Holly and Gastonia in Gaston County. The lake is also accessible to the public for boating and fishing use. There are three boating access areas on the lake and a tailrace fishing platform for bank fishing in cooperation with the North Carolina Wildlife Resources Commission.

== Power generation ==
The lake generates hydro-electric power for the nearby region. It also supported the Riverbend Steam Station by cooling the steam that drove the turbines prior to its decommissioning in 2013.

=== Mountain Island Hydro Station ===
Mountain Island Hydro Station is a four-unit generating facility with a capacity of 60 megawatts located in Gaston County, North Carolina. It was built in 1923 to meet the growing demand for electricity by homeowners in the Carolinas. At the time, electricity was largely used by industrial customers.

=== Riverbend Steam Station ===
Riverbend Steam Station was a 454 megawatt, coal-fired generating facility located in Gaston County, North Carolina. It was first built in 1929. The four-unit station was named for a bend in the Catawba River on which it was located. Riverbend was used as a cycling station and was brought on line to supplement supply when electricity demand was highest. Four gas-fired combustion turbine units were also housed on the site. The four gas-fired turbines were retired in October 2012. The power house and stacks were demolished in 2018, with remediation of the coal ash ponds ongoing as of mid-2019. Duke Energy claimed that coal ash basins from Riverbend Steam Station has fully been excavated in March 2019.

== Water pollution ==
The North Carolina Department of Environment and Natural Resources is planning a consent order for Duke Energy plants on the lake which have left local groundwater contaminated with high levels of heavy metals such as arsenic and cobalt. The discharge has come from a lack of lining in older coal ash ponds containing namesake waste which threatens the water quality of Mountain Island Lake's ecosystem and has as of August 2013 warranted over $99,000 worth of fines.

== Attractions ==
Inside of Mountain Island Lake is a large island called Mountain Island, a big landmark. Other area attractions include the historic Rural Hill Farm, Historic Latta Plantation, and the Carolina Raptor Center.

=== Carolina Raptor Center ===
The Carolina Raptor Center is dedicated to environmental stewardship and the conservation of birds of prey, through education, research, and the rehabilitation of injured and orphan raptors. Over 23 different species of raptors are on a 3/4 mile long nature trail inside Latta Plantation Nature Preserve, on the banks of Mountain Island Lake.

=== Historic Latta Plantation ===
The Plantation was built in 1800 and called Latta Place after its owner James Latta, an immigrant from Northern Ireland. Latta was a successful traveling merchant through 1820. He then retired and turned his property into a cotton plantation consisting of 742 acres and 34 enslaved people. After Mr. Latta's death in 1837, his wife Jane sold the property to David Harry. In 1853, William Sample purchased the property; it was owned by the Sample family until 1922. Crescent Land and Timber, a subsidiary of Duke Power, then purchased the property because of its proximity to the Catawba River and the construction of the dam. It is now a museum.

== See also ==
- Lake Norman
- Lake Wylie
