= John Fulenwider =

Steel pioneer (1756–1826)

- Born: 1756; Switzerland
- Died: 4 September 1826 (aged 69–70)
- Burial place: High Shoals cemetery
- Known for: Developing one of the earliest methods of creating pig iron

John Fulenwider (1756 - 4 September 1826) was a Revolutionary War veteran and an American pioneer in the field of iron manufacturing. He is also considered to be one of the founders of High Shoals, North Carolina.

== Early life ==
Fulenwider was born in Switzerland in 1756 to Jacob and Ester Fulenwider. His family immigrated to Rowan County, North Carolina in the 1760s.

== Military and iron career ==
During the American Revolutionary War, Fulenwider served in the Rowan County militia. He fought at Ramsour’s Mill and Kings Mountain, which were two pivotal battles in the war.

Fulenwider was one of the pioneers in the field of making pig iron using charcoal. Under the “Act to Encourage the Building of Iron Works”, Fulenwider was granted 3000 acres of land to build a manufactory. Fulenwider settled in Lincoln County for the abundance of natural resources, such as iron ore, trees, moving water, and limestone. He established 2 forges in 1795, with the one in High Shoals, North Carolina being the most successful. Fulenwider’s iron was forged into a wide range of products, including plows, horseshoes, wagon tires, chains, nails, tools, muskets, and kitchen implements.

== Death ==
Fulenwider died on 4 September 1826. He owned around 20000 acres of land at the time of his death. His factory in High Shoals, North Carolina was passed on to his son Henry. Nails were sold for 8 cents per pound at this point. There is a plaque in High Shoals in honor of Fulenwider. His forges remained fully operational until 1875.
