= Mountain Island, North Carolina =

- Unincorporated community
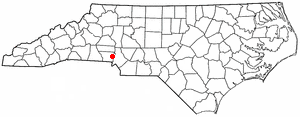
- Location of Mountain Island, North Carolina
- Coordinates: 35°20′00″N 80°59′58″W
- Country: United States
- State: North Carolina
- County: Gaston County
- Founded: 1848
- Incorporated: 1891 (inactive)
- Named for: An island in the Catawba River
- Elevation: 709 ft (216 m)
- Time zone: UTC-5 (Eastern (EST))
  - Summer (DST): UTC-4 (EDT)
- Area code: 704
- GNIS feature ID: 990700

Mountain Island is an unincorporated community in eastern Gaston County, North Carolina, United States. Not to be confused with the Charlotte neighborhood of the same name in Mecklenburg County. It is approximately 3 miles (4.8 km) north of Mount Holly.

Its name comes from a small island in Mountain Island Lake, on the border of Gaston and Mecklenburg counties. Located on the extreme southwestern end of the lake, the island is mainly used as an anchor point for recreation, picnicking, and camping.

A cotton mill, said by some authorities to be the first in Gaston County, was established on Mountain Island in 1848 by Thomas R. Tate and Henry Humphreys, owners of the Mount Hecla steam-powered mill near Greensboro, North Carolina. They hoped to take advantage of the less expensive water power from the Catawba River. The site at river's edge featured a partially completed canal around the shoals that could be used for a mill race, and a steep island whose top now rises from the lake. Machinery was moved from the Mount Hecla mill by mule-drawn wagon and operations began in 1849. A village of brick houses grew around the mill. The mill and village were destroyed on July 15, 1916, in a flood caused by a hurricane.

In 1920 the Charlottesville, Virginia company of Rinehart and Dennis was awarded a Duke Power Company contract to build a dam at Mountain Island for the purpose of using water power to generate electricity. To supplement housing for its workers, a large number of temporary frame houses were built by the contractor. In 1923, only seven years after the flood, the Mountain Island Hydroelectric Plant was completed and in service. The Mountain Island Dam and Hydroelectric Station still operates today.

St. Joseph's Catholic Church was listed on the National Register of Historic Places in 1979.
