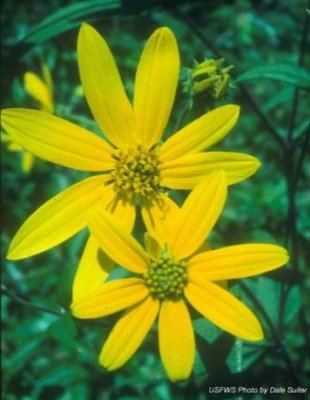

Conservation status
- Vulnerable (NatureServe)

Scientific classification
- Kingdom: Plantae
- Clade: Tracheophytes
- Clade: Angiosperms
- Clade: Eudicots
- Clade: Asterids
- Order: Asterales
- Family: Asteraceae
- Tribe: Heliantheae
- Genus: Helianthus
- Species: H. schweinitzii

Binomial name
- Helianthus schweinitzii Torr. & A.Gray

= Helianthus schweinitzii =

Species of sunflower

Helianthus schweinitzii, commonly known as Schweinitz's sunflower, is a rare, federally endangered perennial wildflower native to the Piedmont physiographic province of North Carolina and South Carolina. It is a member of the sunflower family (Asteraceae). Typically growing between 1 and 2 meters (3 to 7 feet) tall, the plant is distinguished by its yellow ray flowers, narrow leaves, and unique ecological and genetic traits. It is primarily found in specialized open habitats such as prairies, roadsides, and utility and highway rights-of-way in the Carolinas. It is one of the rarest species of sunflower in the United States, with only about 90 known populations, many containing fewer than 40 plants each. The U.S. Fish and Wildlife Service listed Schweinitz's sunflower as an endangered species on May 7, 1991.

== History ==
Botanists John Torrey (1796–1873) and Asa Gray (1810–1888) first mentioned the species in 1842. It is named for Lewis David von Schweinitz (1780–1834), a Salem, North Carolina clergyman and botanist who discovered the species. For over a century after its first account, the species was subject to misidentification and taxonomic confusion, particularly regarding its geographic distribution and chromosome counts; these issues were later corrected in botanical revisions. More recent studies have supported these historical assessments with modern genomic sequencing, providing new insight into the history and evolution of the earlier populations.

== Taxonomy and evolution ==
Recent genomic and taxonomic research has contributed greater insight into the evolving history of Helianthus schweinitzii. Using modern skim-sequencing practices, researchers have further examined the species’ evolutionary origins and its notably low genetic variation compared with other members of the broader Helianthus genus. Additionally, historical taxonomic revisions have corrected earlier inconsistencies in chromosome counts, morphological markers, and geographic distribution, allowing botanists to identify and classify H. schweinitzii more accurately in the field.

== Description ==
Schweinitz's sunflower typically grows from 1 to 4 meters (3 to 13 feet) tall. It usually reaches about 2 meters (6.5 feet) and occasionally reaches up to 4 to 5 meters (16 feet). The sunflower produces underground tubers and rhizomes. Its stems are purple and usually solitary, branching only at or above mid-stem. Its leaves are thick and stiff, tending to droop towards the end. The sunflower is perennial and flowers for about 2 to 3 weeks in early October. One plant generally produces 3 to 6 yellow flower heads. Each head has 8 to 15 disc florets surrounding 40 or more disc florets. The Schweinitz's sunflower spreads through seed dispersion and has no dormant period.

== Habitat and distribution ==
While Helianthus schweinitzi is frequently documented surviving along managed utility rights-of-way, power lines, and roadsides, field studies of existing Piedmont Prairie sites within North and South Carolina have revealed more about the species' historical ecological conditions. Research on these specialized habitats highlights the species' dependence on specific environmental elements, such as shallow, poor, clay, and/or rocky soils and other microenvironmental conditions specifically found throughout the southern Piedmont region, emphasizing the importance of conserving rare prairie remnants to protect its natural habitat. Additionally, the flower flourishes in full to partial sun exposure. As of 2003, approximately 80% of known populations were located near railways, utility roads, and roadsides. Today, 94 known populations exist in North and South Carolina, which is a significant increase from the 13 marked in the 1990s.

== Conservation ==
The U.S. Fish and Wildlife Service listed Schweinitz's sunflower as “Endangered” on May 7, 1991, and the species currently has no designated critical habitat. During periodic 5-year reviews, the species remained classified as endangered rather than being downlisted to "Threatened," as it did not meet all required recovery criteria—for example, establishing a set number of geographically distinct, self-sustaining, and managed populations across North and South Carolina. Additionally, the U.S. Fish and Wildlife Service failed to choose managers for each population and to design and implement management plans. Instead, it was assigned a new priority ranking indicating a high level of threat while also recognizing potential for recovery.

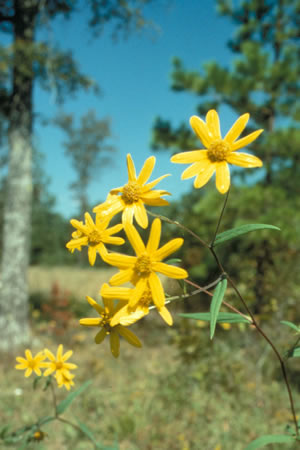
Schweinitz's sunflower in its native habitat

While all known populations are actively monitored, population trends differ by location, with few sites showing a consistent, long-term increase in individual numbers. Conservation efforts increasingly emphasize monitoring genetic variation among these isolated groups to support their long-term viability and overall health.

Due to the flower being commonly found in rapidly developing areas, its greatest threats include human development, including construction, industrial expansion, and routine maintenance. Additionally, the suppression of natural fires can contribute to habitat loss by enabling excessive vegetation growth and encroachment.

The species is protected under the federal Endangered Species Act of 1973, as well as state-level regulations such as the North Carolina Plant Protection Act, which limits commercial trade and unauthorized collection without a license. In South Carolina, state law prohibits the destruction or harm of protected plants on lands managed by the Department of Natural Resources, which mentions that the state code prohibits “gathering, damaging, or destroying” of all plants. Currently, the International Union for Conservation of Nature (IUCN) has not assessed or listed the species.

== Cultivation and uses ==
Although Helianthus schweinitzii is primarily managed as a rare, federally endangered species rather than a commercial crop, wild sunflower species in the genus Helianthus are valuable for botanical research and agricultural development. Through decades of botanical exploration and germplasm collection, researchers have examined wild sunflower species to identify adaptive traits such as drought tolerance, disease resistance, and environmental resilience. Conserving wild species such as H. schweinitzii therefore helps preserve genetic resources and may provide valuable insights for improving and breeding cultivated sunflower varieties. In specialized native landscaping or conservation garden settings, cultivation requires conditions that mimic its natural Piedmont Prairie habitat, including well-suited soils and full sunlight. However, direct cultivation remains limited due to the species’ protected conservation status.
