= High Shoals, North Carolina =

- City
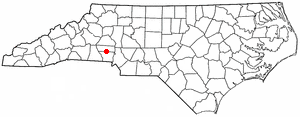
- Location of HighShoals, North Carolina
- Coordinates: 35°23′45″N 81°12′17″W
- Country: United States
- State: North Carolina
- County: Gaston
- Incorporated: November 6, 1973

Government
  - Mayor: P.J. Rathbone

Area
  - Total: 2.66 sq mi (6.88 km^{2})
  - Land: 2.60 sq mi (6.74 km^{2})
  - Water: 0.054 sq mi (0.14 km^{2})
- Elevation: 715 ft (218 m)

Population (2020)
  - Total: 595
  - Density: 228.6/sq mi (88.28/km^{2})
- Time zone: UTC-5 (Eastern (EST))
  - Summer (DST): UTC-4 (EDT)
- ZIP code: 28077
- Area code: 704
- FIPS code: 37-31440
- GNIS feature ID: 2405829
- Website: https://cityofhighshoals.com/

High Shoals is a city in Gaston County, North Carolina, United States, named for the high rocky shoal across the Catawba River. As of the 2020 census, High Shoals had a population of 595.

== History ==
High Shoals was the location of the High Shoals Iron Works, founded by Swiss-born John Fulenwider in about 1795. Fulenwider developed one of the earliest methods of making pig iron with the charcoal process. During the War of 1812, his High Shoals ironworks produced cannonballs for use by the United States Army. Fulenwider died in 1826 and is buried at High Shoals cemetery. The ironworks he developed remained in operation until 1875.

In the last decade of the 19th century, the community of High Shoals became totally owned by High Shoals Mills, a textile company founded by Charlotte industrialist Daniel A. Tompkins.

Eventually, the mill homes were sold to private owners. High Shoals was incorporated on November 6, 1973, the most-recently incorporated municipality in Gaston County.

== Geography ==
According to the United States Census Bureau, the town has a total area of 2.7 square miles (6.9 km^{2}), of which 2.6 square miles (6.7 km^{2}) is land and 0.04 square miles (0.1 km^{2}), or 2.10%, is water.

The South Fork Catawba River flows through High Shoals. Areas northeast of the river are assigned to the Hoyle Creek watershed, while those southwest of the river are in the Beaverdam Creek watershed. Sulfur Branch flows through western High Shoals (including Briarcreek Golf Course) and enters the South Fork at the south end of town.

Most of High Shoals is located in Dallas Township, except for a western portion of the town which is in Cherryville Township.

== Demographics ==
Historical population
Census	Pop.	Note	%±
1980	586		—
1990	605		3.2%
2000	729		20.5%
2010	696		−4.5%
2020	595		−14.5%
U.S. Decennial Census

As of the census of 2000, there were 729 people, 284 households, and 214 families residing in the town. The population density was 407.5 inhabitants per square mile (157.3/km^{2}). There were 315 housing units at an average density of 176.1 per square mile (68.0/km^{2}). The racial makeup of the town was 88.07% White, 9.33% African American, 0.27% Native American, 0.14% from other races, and 2.19% from two or more races. Hispanic or Latino of any race were 2.33% of the population.

There were 284 households, out of which 38.7% had children under the age of 18 living with them, 51.8% were married couples living together, 19.0% had a female householder with no husband present, and 24.6% were non-families. 21.5% of all households were made up of individuals, and 8.5% had someone living alone who was 65 years of age or older. The average household size was 2.57 and the average family size was 2.96.

In the town, the population was spread out, with 29.2% under the age of 18, 8.9% from 18 to 24, 34.6% from 25 to 44, 17.7% from 45 to 64, and 9.6% who were 65 years of age or older. The median age was 31 years. For every 100 females, there were 96.5 males. For every 100 females age 18 and over, there were 96.9 males.

The median income for a household in the town was $33,906, and the median income for a family was $36,429. Males had a median income of $31,711 versus $20,833 for females. The per capita income for the town was $14,881. About 15.5% of families and 17.5% of the population were below the poverty line, including 25.5% of those under age 18 and 18.1% of those age 65 or over.

== Education ==
Public education in High Shoals is administered by the Gaston County Schools public school system. There had been one elementary school in the town. However, High Shoals Elementary was closed in 1998 for financial reasons and consolidated with Costner Elementary School near Dallas, North Carolina. Average attendance in 1908 was only 80. There was also another school named St. John’s Mission School.

Today, most of High Shoals is within the attendance district for Costner Elementary, except for a section on the eastern edge of town which belongs to the attendance district of Springfield Elementary School (grades K-2) and Kiser Elementary School (grades 3-5), both in Stanley. All elementary school graduates from High Shoals feed into W.C. Friday Middle School and North Gaston High School, both in Dallas.

== Religious life ==
Churches in High Shoals include First Baptist Church, New Heights Baptist Church, High Shoals Church of God, and Riverview True Holiness Church of God.
