= Brown Town, North Carolina =

- Unincorporated community
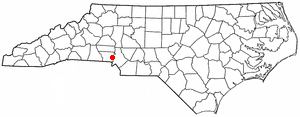
- Location in the U.S. state of North Carolina
- Coordinates: 35°15′12″N 81°01′20″W
- Country: United States
- State: North Carolina
- County: Gaston
- Elevation: 646 ft (197 m)
- Time zone: UTC-5 (Eastern (EST))
  - Summer (DST): UTC-4 (EDT)
- Area code: 704
- FIPS code: 37-08365
- GNIS feature ID: 1019323

Brown Town is an unincorporated community in Gaston County, North Carolina, United States. It is located on the eastern edge of the town of Belmont along the Catawba River.

Fire protection in Brown Town is provided by Community Volunteer Fire Department.
