= Dellview, North Carolina =

- Town
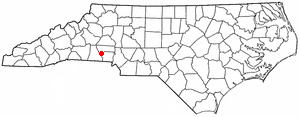
- Location in the U.S. state of North Carolina
- Coordinates: 35°23′12″N 81°24′46″W
- Country: United States
- State: North Carolina
- County: Gaston

Area
  - Total: 0.11 sq mi (0.29 km^{2})
  - Land: 0.11 sq mi (0.29 km^{2})
  - Water: 0 sq mi (0.00 km^{2})
- Elevation: 961 ft (293 m)

Population (2020)
  - Total: 6
  - Density: 53.0/sq mi (20.48/km^{2})
- Time zone: UTC-5 (Eastern (EST))
  - Summer (DST): UTC-4 (EDT)
- ZIP code: 28021
- Area code: 704
- FIPS code: 37-16820
- GNIS feature ID: 2406373 US Board on Geographic Names. United States Geological Survey.

Dellview is an inactive incorporated town in Gaston County, North Carolina, United States. Its population was 13 at the 2010 census but dropped to 6 as of the 2020 census.

Dellview is located in the Muddy Fork watershed, a tributary of Buffalo Creek flowing to the Broad River in South Carolina. The town collects no taxes from its residents, almost all of whom are relatives. Dellview also doesn't request any state money. The town has no police department, nor a water or sewer system. Since it is inactive, the town has no elected officials or municipal elections, and is now governed by Gaston County.

Dellview Road, the community's only paved road, forms the town's northern border. North of it lies the town of Cherryville.

== Demographics ==
Historical population
Census	Pop.	Note	%±
2010	13		—
2020	6		−53.8%
U.S. Decennial Census

== History ==
Dellview was incorporated as a town in 1925 as a political gesture. Gaston County law prohibited the shooting of stray dogs that crossed onto a citizen's land. The law was disliked by two families of the Dellinger name, who were both poultry farmers. They complained that stray dogs were raiding their chicken coops on their farms, which neighbored each other. To remedy the situation, the Dellingers petitioned fellow kinsman David R. Dellinger, who was a North Carolina state representative, to propose a bill to the General Assembly for incorporating the Dellinger's farms into a town known as "Dellview" (the clipped form of Dellinger merged with the word "view"). The bill passed, formally incorporating the town in 1925. Immediately thereafter, the town leaders passed an ordinance allowing for the citizens to shoot any stray dog that crosses onto their property.

No one for Dellview responded to a Census Mapping Survey in 1978, and as a result, the town was declared inactive, and thereby the governing rights were transferred fully back to Gaston County. In 1980, the decision was reversed after a citizen petitioned, but the town was declared inactive once again on the Census 2000. For many years, the town of Dellview enjoyed the distinction of being the smallest incorporated community in the state.
