= Hardins, North Carolina =

Hardin, North Carolina
- Unincorporated community
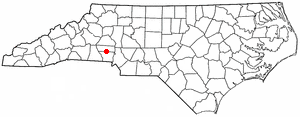
- Location in the U.S. state of North Carolina
- Coordinates: 35°22′45″N 81°11′25″W
- Country: United States
- State: North Carolina
- County: Gaston
- Elevation: 774 ft (236 m)
- Time zone: UTC-5 (Eastern (EST))
  - Summer (DST): UTC-4 (EDT)
- Area code: 704
- FIPS code: 37-29480
- GNIS feature ID: 986395

Hardins is an unincorporated community in Gaston County, North Carolina, United States. It is located approximately 2.0 miles (3.2 km) south of the town of High Shoals.
