= Lowell, North Carolina =

- City
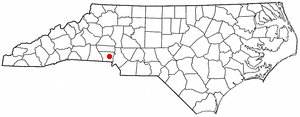
- Location of Lowell, North Carolina
- Coordinates: 35°14′59″N 81°06′07″W
- Country: United States
- State: North Carolina
- County: Gaston
- Incorporated: 1879

Government
  - Mayor: Sandy Railey

Area
  - Total: 3.68 sq mi (9.53 km^{2})
  - Land: 3.68 sq mi (9.52 km^{2})
  - Water: 0.0077 sq mi (0.02 km^{2})
- Elevation: 712 ft (217 m)

Population (2020)
  - Total: 3,654
  - Density: 994.4/sq mi (383.94/km^{2})
- Time zone: UTC−5 (Eastern (EST))
  - Summer (DST): UTC−4 (EDT)
- ZIP code: 28098
- Area code: 704
- FIPS code: 37-39480
- GNIS feature ID: 2404966
- Website: lowellnc.gov

Lowell is a small city in Gaston County, North Carolina, United States, located east of Gastonia. As of the 2020 census, Lowell had a population of 3,654.

== Geography ==
According to the United States Census Bureau, the city has a total area of 2.7 square miles (6.9 km^{2}), of which 0.004 square miles (0.01 km^{2}), or 0.21%, is water. The South Fork Catawba River borders Lowell on the north, and the city is part of the Cramerton Watershed.

== History ==
Lowell was incorporated in 1879. It was named after Lowell, Massachusetts, in hopes the city would become a similar textile center. The settlement dates back to 1848, when the Woodlawn Mill was built on the South Fork Catawba River. When grading was done for the Atlanta and Richmond Air-Line Railway in 1870 and a small depot was built in the community, it was given the name "Wright's Station", because the nearest resident was William Wright.

== Demographics ==
Historical population
Census	Pop.	Note	%±
1880	35		—
1900	290		—
1910	876		202.1%
1920	1,151		31.4%
1930	1,664		44.6%
1940	1,826		9.7%
1950	2,313		26.7%
1960	2,784		20.4%
1970	3,307		18.8%
1980	2,917		−11.8%
1990	2,704		−7.3%
2000	2,662		−1.6%
2010	3,526		32.5%
2020	3,654		3.6%
U.S. Decennial Census

=== 2020 census ===
Lowell racial composition
Race	Number	Percentage
White (non-Hispanic)	2,582	70.66%
Black or African American (non-Hispanic)	424	11.6%
Native American	13	0.36%
Asian	77	2.11%
Other/Mixed	234	6.4%
Hispanic or Latino	324	8.87%

As of the 2020 census, Lowell had a population of 3,654. The median age was 40.2 years. 22.1% of residents were under the age of 18 and 16.7% of residents were 65 years of age or older. For every 100 females there were 93.8 males, and for every 100 females age 18 and over there were 90.0 males age 18 and over.

100.0% of residents lived in urban areas, while 0.0% lived in rural areas.

There were 1,501 households in Lowell, including 855 families, and 31.3% of households had children under the age of 18 living in them. Of all households, 41.3% were married-couple households, 18.7% were households with a male householder and no spouse or partner present, and 32.6% were households with a female householder and no spouse or partner present. About 29.6% of all households were made up of individuals and 11.2% had someone living alone who was 65 years of age or older.

There were 1,598 housing units, of which 6.1% were vacant. The homeowner vacancy rate was 0.9% and the rental vacancy rate was 7.4%.

=== 2000 census ===
As of the census of 2000, there were 2,662 people, 1,085 households, and 748 families residing in the city. The population density was 1,011.8 inhabitants per square mile (390.7/km^{2}). There were 1,137 housing units at an average density of 432.2 per square mile (166.9/km^{2}). The racial makeup of the city was 91.40% White, 6.46% African American, 0.23% Native American, 0.64% Asian, 0.19% from other races, and 1.09% from two or more races. Hispanic or Latino of any race were 1.31% of the population.

There were 1,085 households, out of which 30.1% had children under the age of 18 living with them, 48.5% were married couples living together, 15.1% had a female householder with no husband present, and 31.0% were non-families. 26.4% of all households were made up of individuals, and 12.1% had someone living alone who was 65 years of age or older. The average household size was 2.41 and the average family size was 2.88.

In the city, the age distribution of the population shows 23.0% under the age of 18, 7.4% from 18 to 24, 30.7% from 25 to 44, 22.0% from 45 to 64, and 16.9% who were 65 years of age or older. The median age was 39 years. For every 100 females, there were 85.4 males. For every 100 females age 18 and over, there were 81.6 males.

The median income for a household in the city was $33,586, and the median income for a family was $39,143. Males had a median income of $30,750 versus $24,063 for females. The per capita income for the city was $15,809. About 10.1% of families and 11.0% of the population were below the poverty line, including 15.4% of those under age 18 and 6.5% of those age 65 or over.

== Government ==
Lowell is governed by a mayor and a five-member city council. It is run by a full-time City Manager. Lowell operates its own Police Department. Fire protection is provided by the Lowell Volunteer Fire Department (Station 17).

Lowell is in South Point Township.

== Education ==
Public education in Lowell is administered by the Gaston County Schools public school system. The public schools in Lowell are Lowell Elementary School, Kindergarten through Grade 5, and Holbrook Middle School, Grades 6–8.

Most of Lowell is in the attendance district for Lowell Elementary School. Southeastern parts of the city are in the attendance district for McAdenville Elementary School in McAdenville, and a small area in southwestern Lowell is in the attendance distinct for Gardner Park Elementary School in Gastonia. All of the city is in the attendance district for Holbrook Middle School.

High school-age students attend Ashbrook High School in Gastonia.

New middle school and high school facilities are currently under construction at the Lowell campus. In the meantime, the school has been renting facilities for the middle school and high school programs at the former campus of Sacred Heart College in Belmont since 1994.

The Lowell Branch of the Gaston County Public Library serves this community.

== Transportation ==
The primary east–west highway passing through Lowell is Interstate 85. Other important highways include U.S. Route 29/U.S. Route 74 (Wilkinson Blvd./Franklin Blvd.) and North Carolina Highway 7 (McAdenville Rd./3rd St./Main St./1st St./Lowell Rd.).

Freight rail service is provided by the Norfolk Southern Railway. While Amtrak's passenger train also follows the Norfolk Southern main line, the nearest station is in Gastonia.

== Points of interest ==
- George Poston Park is located northwest of Lowell on Lowell-Spencer Mountain Road. This Gaston County-operated park includes a playground, four lighted softball/little league fields, four lighted soccer fields, and a mountain bike trail. Next to the park is an abandoned chemical plant that produced dyes and pigments. The facility was turned into a superfund site after many leaks with the on site wastewater treatment plant. The plant was last owned by Yorkshire Americas Inc and was sold to Lowell Investments LLC when Yorkshire Americas went out of business. The site was built in the late fifties and lays abandoned.
- The Lowell Teacherage at 503 W. First St. in Lowell is a Designated Gaston County Historic Property. It was built in 1924 to house teachers when the local school was in session.

== Notable people ==
- Wilbur Howard (1949–2022), MLB outfielder
- Whitey Lockman (1926–2009), MLB player, All-Star selection in 1952 and 1954 World Series champion with the New York Giants
