= Alexis, North Carolina =

- Census-designated place
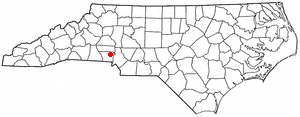
- Location of Alexis, North Carolina
- Coordinates: 35°23′48″N 81°07′09″W
- Country: United States
- State: North Carolina
- County: Gaston

Area
  - Total: 1.98 sq mi (5.13 km^{2})
  - Land: 1.98 sq mi (5.12 km^{2})
  - Water: 0.0039 sq mi (0.01 km^{2})
- Elevation: 856 ft (261 m)

Population (2020)
  - Total: 589
  - Density: 298.2/sq mi (115.13/km^{2})
- Time zone: UTC-5 (Eastern (EST))
  - Summer (DST): UTC-4 (EDT)
- Area code: 704
- GNIS feature ID: 2812793

Alexis is an unincorporated community and census-designated place (CDP) in Gaston County, North Carolina, United States. It is located approximately three miles north of Stanley. It was first listed as a CDP in the 2020 census with a population of 589.

Alexis was incorporated in 1899. Alexis was formerly named Alex's Cross Roads, for an individual named Alexander who owned land in the area.

The community is in Gaston County, but official residents of the community (by zip code) live in both Gaston and Lincoln counties. The zip code for Alexis is 28006.

== Demographics ==
Historical population
Census	Pop.	Note	%±
2020	589		—
U.S. Decennial Census; 2020

=== 2020 census ===
Alexis CDP, North Carolina – Demographic Profile (NH = Non-Hispanic)
Race / Ethnicity	Pop 2020	% 2020
White alone (NH)	540	91.68%
Black or African American alone (NH)	13	2.21%
Native American or Alaska Native alone (NH)	3	0.51%
Asian alone (NH)	2	0.34%
Pacific Islander alone (NH)	0	0.00%
Some Other Race alone (NH)	0	0.00%
Mixed Race/Multi-Racial (NH)	24	4.07%
Hispanic or Latino (any race)	7	1.19%
Total	589	100.00%

Note: the US Census treats Hispanic/Latino as an ethnic category. This table excludes Latinos from the racial categories and assigns them to a separate category. Hispanics/Latinos can be of any race.
