= Daniel Stowe Conservancy =

Conservancy and botanical garden in Belmont, North Carolina, United States

Coordinates: 35.1680°N 81.0578°W

- Daniel Stowe Botanical Garden
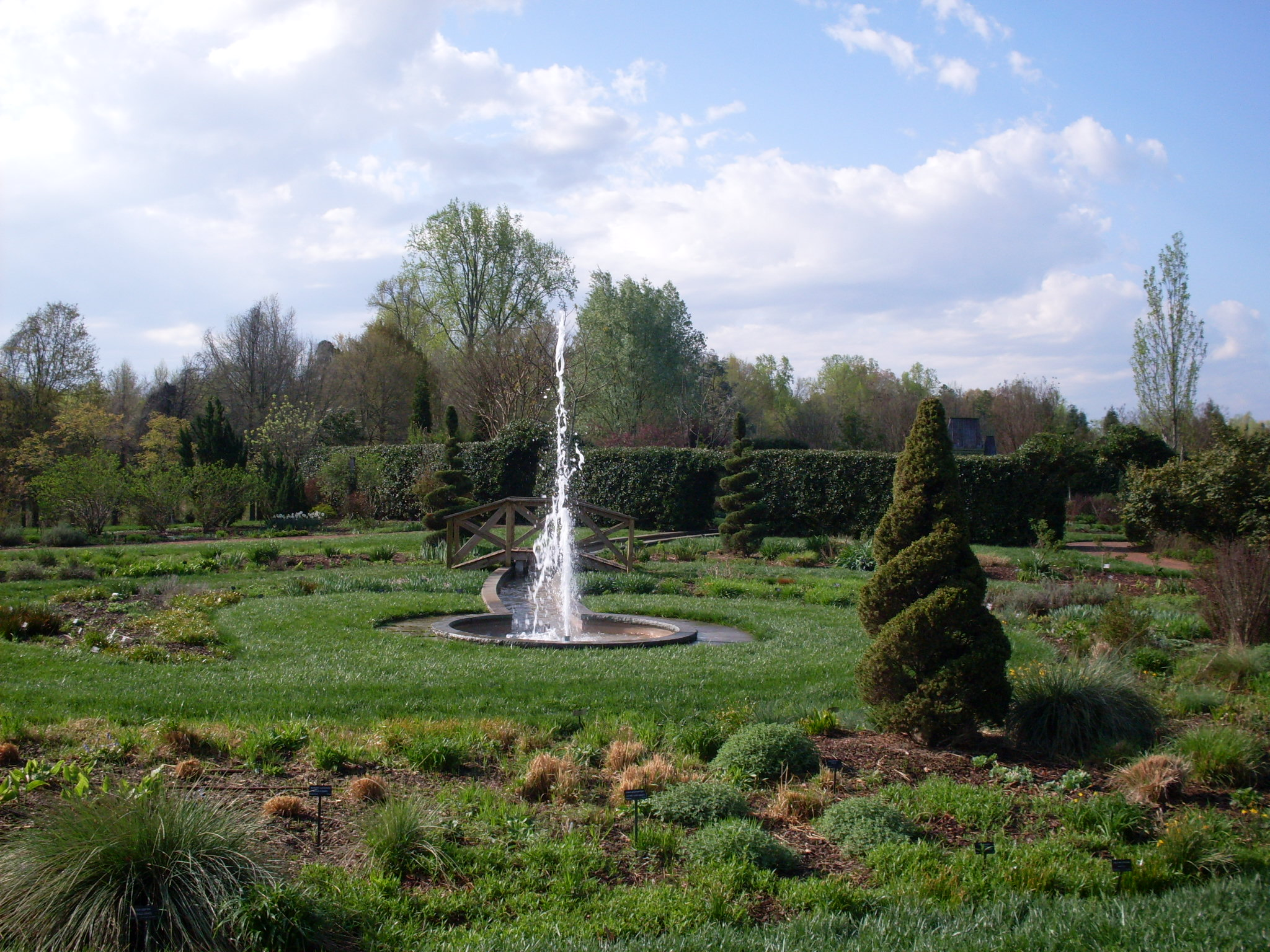
- Interactive map of Daniel Stowe Conservancy
- Type: Conservancy; Botanical garden
- Location: Belmont, North Carolina
- Area: 380 acres (150 ha)
- Website: danielstoweconservancy.org

Daniel Stowe Conservancy is a conservancy and a botanical garden located on 380 acres (1.5 km^{2}) of meadows, woodlands and lakefront property in Belmont, North Carolina. Founded by Daniel J. Stowe, it includes large manicured gardens, natural surrounding areas, including a woodland trail, fountains, and a conservatory.

== History ==
The site has a long history of use by its inhabitants. Originally, Native Americans of the Catawba and Cherokee tribes trapped, fished, hunted and raised families here. Later, the area served as home to early European settlers. In recent years, the garden’s meadowlands have been used as pasture for farm animals, although much of the site is covered by mature deciduous woodlands and pine forest.

The French botanist André Michaux rode and walked across the property in 1795. Michaux found new plants in Gaston County not far from the current garden, including the Bigleaf Magnolia.

The Daniel Stowe Botanical Gardens were reserved by Daniel J. Stowe, a retired textile executive from Belmont, in 1991, and construction began in 1997. The plot of land had initially been part of Stowe's 1,200 acre Seven Oaks Farm, and Stowe donated $14 million initially (approximately $33 million in 2025). The garden hosted the opening of 110 acres (0.45 km^{2}) developed on October 9, 1999. The opportunity to join as a founding member ended with 5,297 members. The Daniel Stowe Conservancy adopted its current name on April 17, 2025, as part of a rebranding to a conservancy.

== Features ==
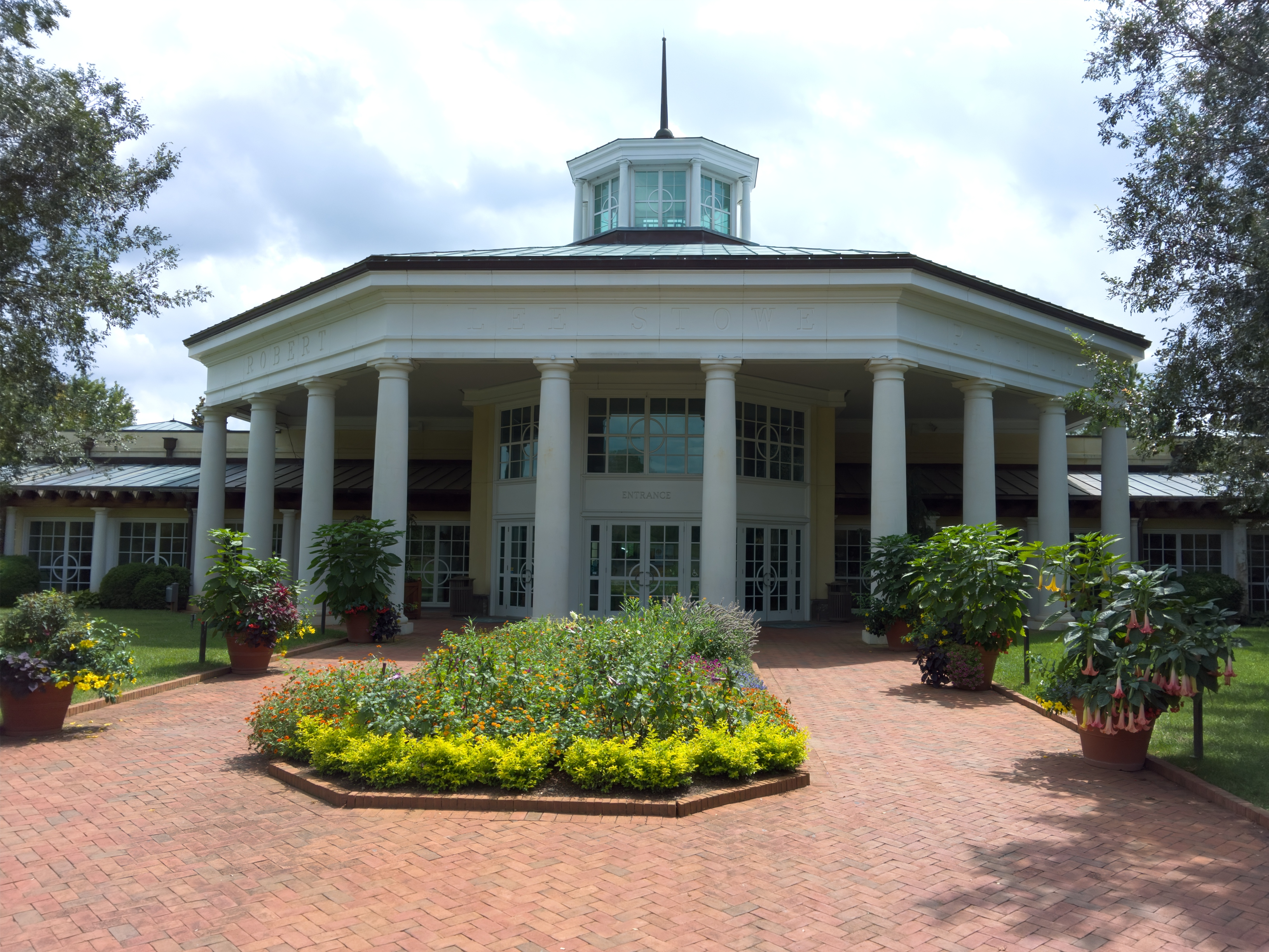
Visitor pavilion.

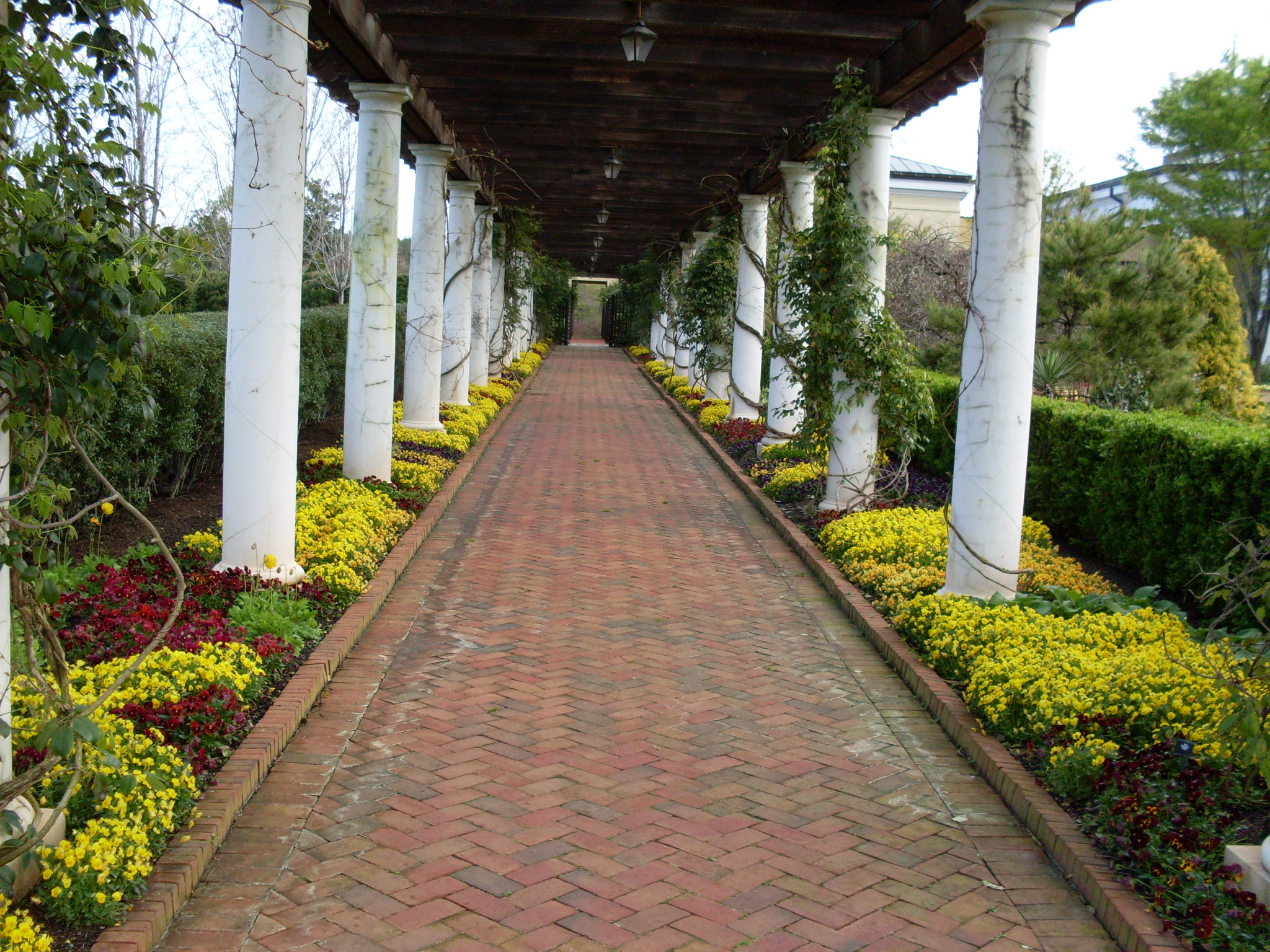
A colonnade at the Daniel Stowe Conservancy

The property includes 30 acres (120,000 m^{2}) of formal gardens, 12 fountains, and eight miles total of trails. The central building on the property is the Robert Lee Stowe Visitor Pavilion, featuring pale yellow stucco walls fronted by 20 white Tuscan columns and a copper roof.

=== Gardens at Stowe ===
The Gardens at Stowe are the central feature of the Conservancy, often referred to as the "crown jewel". The gardens proper includes the Four Seasons Garden and the Lost Hollow Kimbrell Children's Garden. The proceeds from admission and yearly memberships to the Gardens fund the entire conservancy.

=== William H. Williamson III Conservatory ===
The William H. Williamson III Conservatory is a year-round conservatory dedicated to the display of orchids and tropical plants. Opened in 2008, it features a wide range of plants that enable guests to learn about tropical ecosystems around the world. Each winter, the garden presents its Orchid Spectacular.

The conservatory is home to various educational programs. Educational topics vary by the season and by the age group, but most focus on either horticulture and gardening or some aspect of life science or conservation. The series of curriculum-based school programs, specifically designed for kindergarten to fifth-grade levels, meet goals established by the North Carolina Standard Course of Study. The garden also offers year-round special events and classes ranging from gardening and landscape to pottery and cooking with herbs.

=== Other features ===
The Conservancy property, totaling around 380 acres, includes 8 miles of hiking and walking trails, an off-leash dog park, and a collection of themed shops (The Village at Stowe) including the Trailhead Store as well as the Farmhouse Garden Center.

=== Planned features ===
As part of its rebranding in 2025, the Conservancy has announced plans for a series of expansions, including a restaurant and a preschool.

== Reception ==
HGTV named it one of the US's "20 Great Gardens", and USA Today proclaimed it one of the nation's top 10 places to "welcome fall with a flourish". In 2024, Vogue named it best 12 botanical gardens in the United States.

== See also ==
- List of botanical gardens in the United States
