= Ashebrook Park, North Carolina =

- Populated place
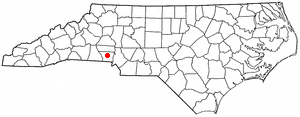
- Location within the U.S. state of North Carolina
- Coordinates: 35°20′32″N 81°13′34″W
- Country: United States
- State: North Carolina
- County: Gaston
- Elevation: 856 ft (261 m)
- Time zone: UTC-5 (Eastern (EST))
  - Summer (DST): UTC-4 (EDT)
- Area code: 704
- FIPS code: 37-02130
- GNIS feature ID: 980321

Ashebrook Park is an unincorporated community in Gaston County, North Carolina, United States. It is located approximately 4 miles (6.4 km) northwest of Dallas.
