= Spencer Mountain, North Carolina =

- Town
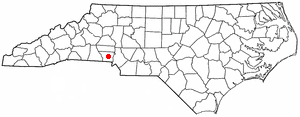
- Location of Spencer Mountain, North Carolina
- Coordinates: 35°18′26″N 81°06′36″W
- Country: United States
- State: North Carolina
- County: Gaston
- Incorporated: 1963
- Incorporation suspended: 2016

Area
  - Total: 0.54 sq mi (1.40 km^{2})
  - Land: 0.49 sq mi (1.26 km^{2})
  - Water: 0.054 sq mi (0.14 km^{2})
- Elevation: 630 ft (190 m)

Population (2020)
  - Total: 0
  - Density: 0/sq mi (0/km^{2})
- Time zone: UTC-5 (Eastern (EST))
  - Summer (DST): UTC-4 (EDT)
- ZIP code: 28054
- Area code: 704
- FIPS code: 37-63780
- GNIS feature ID: 2407382

Spencer Mountain is an inactive incorporated town in Gaston County, North Carolina, United States. According to the 2020 census, the population was listed as zero, down from 37 at the 2010 census.

== Geography ==
The town is located at the base of Spencer Mountain, a 1,250-foot (380 m) summit to the south. The town is sited along the South Fork Catawba River at an elevation of 679 feet (207 m).

According to the United States Census Bureau, the town has a total area of 0.54 square miles (1.4 km^{2}), of which 0.50 square miles (1.3 km^{2}) is land and 0.04 square miles (0.1 km^{2}), or 9.77%, is water.

== History ==
Spencer Mountain was settled in 1772 by Zachariah Spencer, a local Tory. In 1874, J. Harvey Wilson II built a water-powered textile mill (Wilson & Moore Cotton Mill) at the base of Spencer Mountain. W. Thomas Love and John C. Rankin purchased the mill in 1895 and changed its name to Spencer Mountain Mills. A predecessor of Duke Power purchased the mill and the hydroelectric plant that powered it in 1926. The mill was purchased by Pharr Yarns in 1957 and was shut down in 1999. Spencer Mountain was incorporated for a brief period of time between 1895 and 1909 and again in 1963.

On July 15, 1949, WBTV, the CBS affiliate for the Charlotte area, broadcast the first commercial television signal in the Carolinas from its transmitter on Spencer Mountain. WBTV's transmitter remained on Spencer Mountain until 1984, when a new transmitter tower was completed in Dallas, North Carolina, in the north-central portion of Gaston County. The old transmitter tower on Spencer Mountain has since been truncated, but it is still in use by various groups, including NOAA, and local amateur radio clubs.

In August 2018, the former gas station and Spencer Mountain Mansion were razed.

== Demographics ==
Historical population
Census	Pop.	Note	%±
1970	300		—
1980	169		−43.7%
1990	135		−20.1%
2000	51		−62.2%
2010	37		−27.5%
2020	0		−100.0%
U.S. Decennial Census

As of the census of 2000, there were 51 people, 16 households, and 14 families residing in the town. The population density was 104.9 inhabitants per square mile (40.5/km^{2}). There were 17 housing units at an average density of 35.0 per square mile (13.5/km^{2}). The racial makeup of the town was 72.55% White, 19.61% African American and 7.84% Asian.

There were 16 households, out of which 50.0% had children under the age of 18 living with them, 43.8% were married couples living together, 25.0% had a female householder with no husband present, and 12.5% were non-families. 12.5% of all households were made up of individuals, and 6.3% had someone living alone who was 65 years of age or older. The average household size was 3.19 and the average family size was 3.29.

In the town, the population was spread out, with 37.3% under the age of 18, 9.8% from 18 to 24, 25.5% from 25 to 44, 23.5% from 45 to 64, and 3.9% who were 65 years of age or older. The median age was 30 years. For every 100 females, there were 82.1 males. For every 100 females age 18 and over, there were 68.4 males.

The median income for a household in the town was $32,143, and the median income for a family was $32,143. Males had a median income of $32,083 versus $18,750 for females. The per capita income for the town was $14,848. There were no families and 1.3% of the population living below the poverty line, including none under 18 and none of those over 64.

As of 2016, only two residents remained living in the town, Chase and Alice White; mayor and councilwoman, respectively. In May 2016, this husband and wife team were notified that a bill was being introduced in the state legislature that would suspend the town's charter until it is repopulated. The NC General Assembly adopted SL 2016-45 which suspended the charter effective July 1, 2016, with a sunset of June 30, 2019. This suspension was extended in 2019 to 2023 by SL 2019-29 and from 2023 to June 30, 2026, by SL 2023-49.

According to the 2020 census, there were no people living in the town.

== Politics ==
As of October 27, 2009, there were only 29 registered voters and no official candidates for mayor or town council. Two years before, only four people voted and did so by writing in their own names. By 2015, there were only two registered voters in the town, and they elected themselves to the town council by write-in vote.
