= Ranlo, North Carolina =

- Town
- Motto: “Built with Pride”
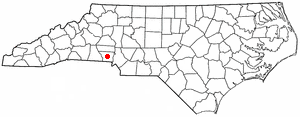
- Location of Ranlo, North Carolina
- Coordinates: 35°17′24″N 81°07′39″W
- Country: United States
- State: North Carolina
- County: Gaston

Government
  - Mayor: Lynn Black

Area
  - Total: 2.06 sq mi (5.34 km^{2})
  - Land: 2.06 sq mi (5.34 km^{2})
  - Water: 0.0039 sq mi (0.01 km^{2})
- Elevation: 810 ft (250 m)

Population (2020)
  - Total: 4,511
  - Density: 2,189.5/sq mi (845.37/km^{2})
- Time zone: UTC-5 (Eastern (EST))
  - Summer (DST): UTC-4 (EDT)
- ZIP code: 28054
- Area code(s): 704 & 980
- FIPS code: 37-55260
- GNIS feature ID: 2407175
- Website: www.ranlo.org

Ranlo is a small town in Gaston County, North Carolina, United States and a suburb of Charlotte, located north of Gastonia. As of the 2020 census, the town population was 4,511, up from 3,434 in 2010.

== Geography ==
According to the United States Census Bureau, the town has 2.06 sq. mi of land and 0.002 sq. mi of water.

== History ==
Ranlo was named for John Calvin Rankin and William Thomas Love, two prominent area industrialists - "Ranlo" was a contraction of RANkin and LOve. The community grew up around their textile mills, which produced cotton goods. Rex Spinning Company was begun in 1915, Ranlo Manufacturing Company in 1916, and Priscilla Spinning Company in 1921. Nearby, the community of Smyre was developed around the A. M. Smyre Manufacturing Company, which was founded in 1917. In 1963, Ranlo and Smyre were incorporated as the Town of Ranlo, in reaction to the concern over possible annexation into Gastonia. However, the part of the Smyre mill village south of the Norfolk Southern Railway was not included, and was eventually annexed by Gastonia in June 1996.

Row houses were erected in the 1920s and 1930s and still stand today. At the time, they were owned by the mill and rented at very low rates to workers. They have long since been sold to individuals, and the mills are 75-80% closed. Only one or two still operate and they are at low capacity. The town, however, has become a "bedroom community" and prides itself on its facilities and growth. New industry has started to move in and new neighborhoods are being built.

== Demographics ==
Historical population
Census	Pop.	Note	%±
1970	2,092		—
1980	1,774		−15.2%
1990	1,650		−7.0%
2000	2,198		33.2%
2010	3,434		56.2%
2020	4,511		31.4%
U.S. Decennial Census

=== 2020 census ===
As of the 2020 census, Ranlo had a population of 4,511. The median age was 35.4 years. 26.2% of residents were under the age of 18 and 12.1% were 65 years of age or older. For every 100 females, there were 96.6 males, and for every 100 females age 18 and over, there were 93.8 males.

99.6% of residents lived in urban areas, while 0.4% lived in rural areas.

There were 1,634 households, of which 40.0% had children under the age of 18 living in them. Of all households, 49.0% were married-couple households, 16.0% were households with a male householder and no spouse or partner present, and 27.2% were households with a female householder and no spouse or partner present. About 20.0% of all households were made up of individuals, and 8.5% had someone living alone who was 65 years of age or older.

There were 1,720 housing units, of which 5.0% were vacant. The homeowner vacancy rate was 1.7% and the rental vacancy rate was 4.9%.

Ranlo racial composition
Race	Num.	Perc.
White (non-Hispanic)	2,599	57.61%
Black or African American (non-Hispanic)	1,038	23.01%
Native American	18	0.4%
Asian	116	2.57%
Other/Mixed	188	4.17%
Hispanic or Latino	552	12.24%

=== 2000 census ===
As of the census of 2000, there were 2,198 people, 857 households, and 642 families residing in the town. The population density was 1,598.5 inhabitants per square mile (617.2/km^{2}). There were 917 housing units at an average density of 666.9 per square mile (257.5/km^{2}). The racial makeup of the town was 91.86% White, 6.10% African American, 0.32% Native American, 0.36% Asian, 0.27% Pacific Islander, 0.14% from other races, and 0.96% from two or more races. Hispanic or Latino of any race were 0.55% of the population.

There were 857 households, out of which 26.5% had children under the age of 18 living with them, 56.2% were married couples living together, 14.4% had a female householder with no husband present, and 25.0% were non-families. 21.2% of all households were made up of individuals, and 9.1% had someone living alone who was 65 years of age or older. The average household size was 2.56 and the average family size was 2.95.

In the town, the population was spread out, with 23.0% under the age of 18, 7.7% from 18 to 24, 28.4% from 25 to 44, 26.3% from 45 to 64, and 14.6% who were 65 years of age or older. The median age was 38 years. For every 100 females, there were 95.0 males. For every 100 females age 18 and over, there were 89.8 males.

The median income for a household in the town was $35,160, and the median income for a family was $40,391. Males had a median income of $31,534 versus $21,250 for females. The per capita income for the town was $17,180. About 6.7% of families and 8.1% of the population were below the poverty line, including 12.3% of those under age 18 and 7.8% of those age 65 or over.
