= Garden Parkway =

Canceled toll road in the U.S. state of North Carolina

- Gaston East–West Connector
- Garden Parkway corridor highlighted in red

Major junctions
- West end: I-85 in Gastonia
- East end: I-485 near Charlotte

Location
- Country: United States
- State: North Carolina
- Counties: Gaston, Mecklenburg

Highway system
- North Carolina Highway System; Interstate; US; State; Scenic

The Garden Parkway was a proposed limited access toll road that was to be built in the U.S. state of North Carolina. The route would have passed through portions of Gaston and Mecklenburg counties.

== Route description ==
The planned routing of the Garden Parkway would total between 21.5 and 23.7 miles (34.6 and 38.1 km) in length. The highway was to begin between Gastonia and Bessemer City; going south, connecting US Highway 29/US Highway 74 (US 29/US 74)and US 321. The highway then would go east, connecting North Carolina Highway 274 (NC 274), NC 279, and NC 273. Crossing over the Catawba River, the highway would end at the Interstate 485 (I-485) and West Boulevard interchange in Mecklenburg County, immediately southwest of Charlotte/Douglas International Airport.

A connector road was also proposed between I-85 and US 321 just north of Gastonia, but it was removed in later planning stages. Since 2013, the project has been cancelled indefinitely.

== History ==
=== Cost and construction estimates ===
Preliminary costs were estimated (as of August 2006) to be between $732 million and $1.568 billion (equivalent to $1.12 billion–2.41 billion in 2025), with final costs to be determined during design. The North Carolina Turnpike Authority had projected initial construction as beginning in early 2010, with completion expected by early 2015 and was the projected date for completion to I-85.

=== Project purpose ===
The purpose of the project was originally conceived by the Gaston Urban Area Metropolitan Planning Organization (Gaston MPO) to provide an east-west connection between I-85 west of Gastonia to I-485 in Mecklenburg County. Gaston County commissioners approved the concept in 1991. Funding was available to build the toll road to US 321, south of Gastonia beginning in 2010. Completion date was scheduled in 2030. Projections showed 19,000–21,000 vehicles at the project's US 321 terminus in 2030.

=== Community opposition ===
Opposition to the road dates at least as far back as August 18, 1992. Community opposition was forming against what some affected property owners have called "the toll road to nowhere". They asserted that the toll road would discharge 20,000 vehicles through the York-Chester neighborhood, which is on the National Register of Historic Places, and that the project would not meet the purpose of providing the east–west connection that was originally conceived.

=== Community support ===
Community support had formed as a counter to a toll road opposition group who referred to the project as "the toll road to nowhere". The "Build The Garden Parkway" group claimed that the Garden Parkway "...is the result of many years of hard work and planning by people who care about their community. It is a commitment to Gaston County's growth and development. It is our chance to make a lasting, positive impact on the future for us all, and it will not come again." During the middle of 2009, at public meetings in the towns of Belmont and Gastonia, pro-parkway residents arrived to show their support with green signs and t-shirts featuring the slogan, "Build The Garden Parkway! Gaston County's Road To the Future". The Gaston Regional Chamber of Commerce had also been vocal in their support of the Garden parkway project. Chamber president Elyse Cochran was on record in stating, "we feel it is for the greater good of Gaston County as a whole, what this proposed project does is open up opportunities for this community to attract positive growth and development long term, adding to the tax coffers of our community."

=== Project delays and cancellation ===
Originally scheduled to be completed in 2015, delays resulted in required environmental permits and funds from the North Carolina General Assembly, pushing the opening into 2016. In June 2012, the General Assembly continued to fail to provide funds to the Garden Parkway after advisement from the North Carolina Department of Transportation (NCDOT) that they expected lawsuits that would further delay the project. On July 12, 2012, NCDOT withdrew the Garden Parkway permit requests, officially stopping the project. The reason for the withdrawals was because of impending threat of legal battle with environmentalists; however, it was also believed it was withdrawn because it had a similar environmental study done like the Monroe Connector/Bypass, which was struck down by the Fourth Circuit Court of Appeals in Richmond. As a result, it was possible NCDOT may do another environmental study, creating further delays in its construction or cancel the project entirely.

On August 28, 2012, the Catawba Riverkeeper Foundation and Clean Air Carolina (environmental groups) sued in federal court to stop the proposed toll road, claiming the environmental reviews were flawed and hid the project's shortcomings. The goal was to toss out federal regulations that signed off on the Garden Parkway, forcing NCDOT officials to either start a new environmental impact study (further delaying the project by years) or kill it.

In May 2013, the General Assembly rescinded approval of the project. In May 2016, NCDOT made the unusual effort of sending postcards to more than 50,000 residents located along the planned Garden Parkway route that stated that the Garden Parkway was officially dead.

In 2021, a new Catawba River bridge was proposed, called Catawba Crossings, which will be routed similarly to the Garden Parkway, but it will be a boulevard grade with a 45-mile-per-hour (72 km/h) speed limit.

== Exit list ==
Formerly proposed exit list.

| County | Location | mi | km | Exit | Destinations | Notes |
|---|---|---|---|---|---|---|
| Gaston | Gastonia | | | | I-85 | |
| Gaston | Gastonia | | | | US 29 / US 74 | |
| Gaston | Gastonia | | | | Linwood Road | |
| Gaston | | | | | US 321 | |
| Gaston | | | | | Robinson Road | |
| Gaston | | | | | NC 274 | |
| Gaston | | | | | NC 279 | |
| Gaston | | | | | NC 273 | |
| Mecklenburg | | | | | Dixie River Road | |
| Mecklenburg | | | | | I-485 / West Boulevard | |
1.000 mi = 1.609 km; 1.000 km = 0.621 mi
