= North Carolina Highway 153 =

State highway in Rowan County, North Carolina, US

North Carolina Highway 153

Route information
- Maintained by NCDOT
- Length: 2.9 mi (4.7 km)
- Existed: 1930–present

Major junctions
- West end: NC 152 near Landis
- East end: Main Street in Landis

Location
- Country: United States
- State: North Carolina
- Counties: Rowan

Highway system
- North Carolina Highway System; Interstate; US; State; Scenic
← NC 152	→ NC 157

North Carolina Highway 153 (NC 153) is a 2.9-mile-long (4.7 km) primary state highway in the U.S. state of North Carolina. The highway serves as a spur of NC 152 into Landis.

== Route description ==
NC 153 is a short two-lane highway that traverses 2.9 miles (4.7 km), from NC 152 to Landis.

== History ==
Established in 1930 as a new primary routing, from NC 152 to NC 15 (which later became US 170, followed by US 29 and US 29A before finally becoming a secondary road); little has changed since.

== Junction list ==
The entire route is in Rowan County.

Location	mi	km	Destinations	Notes
	0.0	0.0	NC 152 – Mooresville, China Grove	
Landis	2.9	4.7	Main Street	
1.000 mi = 1.609 km; 1.000 km = 0.621 mi
