= Sloans Ferry Bridge =

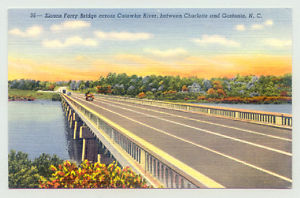
- Sloans Ferry Bridge Postcard
- Coordinates: 35.24577°N 81.00914°W
- Carries: 4 lanes of US 29 / US 74
- Crosses: Catawba River/Lake Wylie
- Locale: Gaston and Mecklenburg Counties
- Other name(s): Catawba River Bridge and Soldiers Memorial Bridge
- Owner: NCDOT
- Maintained by: NCDOT

Characteristics
- Design: Steel stringer
- Total length: 1,124.1 feet (342.6 m)
- Width: 43.3 feet (13.2 m)

History
- Opened: 1933 (second structure)

Statistics
- Daily traffic: 17,000 (as of 2012)

The Sloans Ferry Bridge is a four-lane automobile bridge spanning the Catawba River/Lake Wylie between Belmont, in Gaston County, and Charlotte, in Mecklenburg County. The bridge carries US 29/US 74 and is utilized mostly by local traffic.

== History ==
=== Sloans Ferry Bridge I ===
The first bridge was built in 1911, entirely in reinforced concrete; it was 1,920 feet (590 m) in length and 18 feet (5.5 m) in width. The bridge replaced Sloan's Ferry service, which the bridge was named after. The bridge was damaged by major flooding in July 1916 and could not be rebuilt till around or after 1920, when it received Federal Aid that help rebuild the bridge as part of the National Highway. In 1921, it became part of NC 20; in 1927, it also became part of US 29/US 74.

=== Sloans Ferry Bridge II ===
The second and current bridge was built 1933 and replaced the first Sloans Ferry Bridge. Built in steel and concrete caste-in-place; it is 1,124.1 feet (342.6 m) in length and 43.3 feet (13.2 m) and was helped paid by Federal Aid. Plaques on the bridge show that it was erected as a memorial to the men of the counties of Mecklenburg and Gaston who served in the world war (1917-1918). Originally built as a two-lane bridge with shoulders for pedestrians and temporary parking, it was widen to four-lanes in the 1950s.

== Future ==
The North Carolina Department of Transportation (NCDOT) first released plans in 2017 that would replace the Sloans Ferry Bridge with two new three-lane bridges, which will also include bike lanes and a pedestrian walkway. The plans also included deck space to accommodate future transit such as light rail. At a cost of $37 million; construction was expected to begin in 2022. In 2022, NCDOT released its revised plans that would replace the bridge with one six-lane bridge with protected bicycle and pedestrian shared paths on both sides. The bridge will also be raised at the mid-point to allow better navigational clearance for boating traffic and include a pair of pedestrian overlooks. The revised project will cost $56.6 million, but will also include improvements to the nearby intersection of Hazeleen Avenue and Catawba Street (NC 7). Construction is slated to begin in 2024.
