= Special routes of U.S. Route 29 =

Special routes of U.S. Route 29

Highway system
- United States Numbered Highway System; List; Special; Divided

Several special routes of U.S. Route 29 (US 29) exist. In order from south to north, they are as follows.

== Alabama ==
=== Union Springs truck route ===
U.S. Route 29 Truck
- Location: Union Springs, Alabama
- Length: 1.025 mi (1.650 km)

U.S. Route 29 Truck (US 29 Truck) is a 1.025-mile-long (1.650 km) truck route along Martin Luther King Boulevard South that is signed along State Route 197 in Union Springs, Alabama.

== Georgia ==
=== LaGrange business loop ===
U.S. Highway 29 Business
- Location: LaGrange, Georgia

U.S. Highway 29 Business (US 29 Bus.) was a business route in LaGrange, Georgia, that ran from the US 27/US 29 overlap along Greenville Street to Hill Road to Hogansville Road, ending on US 29 at Commerce and Youngs Mill roads. The route also ran in conjunction with State Route 14 Connector (SR 14 Conn.). Today, SR 14 Conn. runs only along Broad Street.

=== Palmetto–Red Oak alternate route ===
U.S. Highway 29 Alternate
- Location: Palmetto–Red Oak, Georgia
- Length: 13.7 mi (22.0 km)

U.S. Highway 29 Alternate (US 29 Alt.) is a 13.7-mile-long (22.0 km) alternate route of US 29 that exists entirely within the southern and southeastern parts of Fulton County, Georgia. It connects Palmetto with Red Oak, located southwest of Atlanta. It is concurrent with SR 14 Alt. for its entire length.

=== Decatur business loop ===
U.S. Highway 29 Business
- Location: Decatur, Georgia

U.S. Highway 29 Business (US 29 Bus.) was a business route in Decatur, Georgia, that included Ponce de Leon Avenue and Church Street.

=== Lawrenceville–Winder business loop ===
U.S. Highway 29 Business
- Location: Lawrenceville–Winder, Georgia
- Length: 17.5 mi (28.2 km)
- Existed: 1998–present

U.S. Highway 29 Business (US 29 Bus.) was established in 1998 along a former segment of US 29 from Lawrenceville to Winder, Georgia, and travels concurrent with SR 8. The highway begins just northeast of Lawrenceville and heads north of SR 316 (University Parkway, which is concurrent with the US 29 mainline) from Dacula. Then, it continues parallel to US 29/SR 316 through the cities of Auburn, Carl, and Winder. Then, it travels concurrent with SR 53 and heads southeast to intersect with US 29/SR 316 again, therefore making this the end of US 29 Bus. The portion of US 29 Bus. from the western end of the SR 11 and SR 53 concurrencies in Winder to its eastern terminus is part of the National Highway System, a system of routes determined to be the most important for the nation's economy, mobility, and defense.

=== Lawrenceville–Athens business loop ===
U.S. Highway 29 Business
- Location: Lawrenceville-Athens, Georgia
- Existed: 1950–1950

U.S. Highway 29 Business (US 29 Bus.) was a short-lived business loop of US 29 in 1950 that spanned from Lawrenceville to Athens, Georgia, and bypassed communities such as Winder and Bogart.

=== Athens temporary route ===
U.S. Highway 29 Temporary
- Location: Athens, Georgia

== South Carolina ==
=== Greenville alternate route ===
U.S. Highway 29 Alternate
- Location: Greenville, South Carolina
- Existed: 2025–present

US 29 Alternate in Greenville is a brand-new route that was established in 2025.

=== Anderson alternate route ===
U.S. Highway 29 Alternate
- Location: Anderson, South Carolina

=== Anderson business loop ===
U.S. Highway 29 Business
- Location: Anderson, South Carolina
- Length: 6.438 mi (10.361 km)
- Existed: 1947–present

U.S. Highway 29 Business (US 29 Bus.) is a 6.438-mile (10.361 km) business route of US 29 that partially exists within the city limits of Anderson, South Carolina. It was established in 1947 when US 29 was rerouted onto a bypassing route around Anderson; it follows the original alignment through Anderson, via Sayre Street, Main Street, Greenville Street, and Williamston Road. In 1962, it was rerouted from Main Street to Murray Avenue through downtown. The route is two lanes along both Sayre Street and Williamston Road and four lanes along Murray Avenue and Greenville Street. Signage in area clearly marks the business loop but indicates the mainline or bypass US 29 as a truck route.

=== Williamston connector route ===
U.S. Highway 29 Connector
- Location: Williamston, South Carolina
- Length: 3.520 mi (5.665 km)

U.S. Highway 29 Connector (US 29 Conn.) is a 3.520-mile (5.665 km) connector route that connects US 29 west-southwest of Williamston, South Carolina, with South Carolina Highway 20 (SC 20) in the town. It is unsigned, except for signs at each terminus.

=== Greenville alternate route ===
U.S. Highway 29 Alternate
- Location: Greenville, South Carolina
- Existed: 1938–1948

U.S. Highway 29 Alternate (US 29 Alt.) was established in 1938 as renumbering of mainline US 29 through Greenville, South Carolina. The routing took Main Street through the downtown area and then continued north via Buncombe Road, Rutherford Avenue, and Camp Road into Greer. In 1948, it was decommissioned and downgraded to secondary.

=== Greenville business loop ===
U.S. Highway 29 Business
- Location: Greenville, South Carolina
- Existed: 1958–1962

U.S. Highway 29 Business (US 29 Bus.) was a business route of US 29 in Greenville, South Carolina. It was established in 1958 when mainline US 29 was rerouted onto new freeway south of Greenville. The business loop followed Grove Road, Augusta Street, Main Street, Elford Street, and Wade Hampton Boulevard. In 1962, it was decommissioned when US 29 returned to its original alignment through Greenville.

=== Greenville connector route ===
U.S. Highway 29 Connector
- Location: Greenville, South Carolina
- Length: 0.250 mi (402 m)

U.S. Highway 29 Connector (US 29 Conn.) is a 0.250-mile (0.402 km) connector route that connects US 276 (East Stone Avenue) with US 29 (North Church Street/Wade Hampton Boulevard) entirely within the city limits of Greenville, South Carolina. It shares the Wade Hampton Boulevard name with US 29 and is an unsigned highway.

=== Greenville spur route ===
U.S. Highway 29 Spur
- Column Street
- Location: Greenville, South Carolina
- Length: 0.110 mi (177 m)

U.S. Highway 29 Spur (US 29 Spur) is a 0.110-mile (0.177 km) spur route that exists entirely within the city limits of Greenville, South Carolina. It connects US 29 (North Church Street) with US 276 (East Stone Avenue). It is known as Column Street and is an unsigned highway.

=== Greenville–Taylors alternate route 1 ===
U.S. Highway 29 Alternate
- Location: Greenville–Taylors, South Carolina
- Existed: 1937–1939

=== Greenville–Taylors alternate route 2 ===
U.S. Highway 29 Alternate
- Location: Greenville–Taylors, South Carolina
- Existed: 1939–1947

=== Wade Hampton connector route ===
U.S. Highway 29 Connector
- Location: Wade Hampton, South Carolina
- Length: 0.120 mi (193 m)

U.S. Highway 29 Connector (US 29 Conn.) is a 0.120-mile (0.193 km) connector route that connects SC 291 (Pleasantburg Drive), on the Greenville–Wade Hampton line, with US 29 (Wade Hampton Boulevard), in Wade Hampton proper. It is entirely concurrent with Pine Knoll Drive and is an unsigned highway.

=== Wellford alternate route ===
U.S. Highway 29 Alternate
- Location: Wellford, South Carolina

=== Spartanburg–Blacksburg alternate route ===
U.S. Highway 29 Alternate
- Location: Spartanburg–Blacksburg, South Carolina
- Existed: 1954–1962

U.S. Highway 29 Alternate (US 29 Alt.) was established in 1954 as renumbering of mainline US 29 through Spartanburg, Cowpens, Gaffney, and Blacksburg, South Carolina. In 1962, mainline US 29 was moved back on its original routing after sharing a few years with Interstate 85 (I-85), thus decommissioning the alternate route.

=== Fairforest alternate route ===
U.S. Highway 29 Alternate
- Location: Fairforest, South Carolina

=== Spartanburg connector route ===
U.S. Highway 29 Connector
- Location: Spartanburg, South Carolina
- Length: 0.34 mi (550 m)
- Existed: 2013–2016

U.S. Highway 29 Connector (US 29 Conn.) was a connector route on the brief 0.34-mile-long (0.55 km) section of John B. White Sr. Boulevard that was previously unsigned in Spartanburg, South Carolina. It connected US 29 with SC 296. The route was removed when SC 296 was extended over it.

== North Carolina ==
=== Bessemer City alternate route ===
U.S. Highway 29A
- Location: Bessemer City, North Carolina
- Existed: 1937–1938

U.S. Highway 29A (US 29A) was a short-lived alternate route in Bessemer City, North Carolina, that was established in 1937 after mainline US 29/US 74 was rerouted on a more direct path from Kings Mountain to Gastonia. In 1938, it was decommissioned and renumbered as parts of North Carolina Highway 161 (NC 161) and NC 274.

=== Charlotte business loop ===
U.S. Highway 29 Business
- Location: Charlotte, North Carolina
- Length: 17.8 mi (28.6 km)
- Existed: 1960–1963

U.S. Highway 29 Business (US 29 Bus.) was established in 1960 in Charlotte, North Carolina, when US 29 was rerouted onto new freeway in concurrency with I-85. The business loop began at the intersection Wilkinson Boulevard and Little Rock Road, in concurrency with US 74; it followed the old mainline route through Charlotte via Morehead, Graham, Dalton, and Tryon streets, reconnecting with mainline US 29 what is known today as the I-85 Connector (exit 42). In 1962, it was extended west into Belmont, at the intersection of Wilkinson Boulevard and Park Street (NC 273). In 1963, the route was decommissioned when mainline US 29 was moved back to its original alignment through Charlotte.

=== Concord–China Grove alternate route ===
U.S. Highway 29 Alternate
- Location: Concord–China Grove, North Carolina

=== Kannapolis alternate route 1 ===
U.S. Highway 29A
- Location: Kannapolis, North Carolina
- Existed: 1938–1940

U.S. Highway 29A (US 29A) was a short-lived alternate route in Kannapolis, North Carolina, which was established in 1938 after mainline US 29 moved on a more bypass routing through Kannapolis, Landis, and China Grove. In 1940, mainline US 29 swapped with US 29A.

=== Kannapolis alternate route 2 ===
U.S. Highway 29A
- Location: Kannapolis, North Carolina
- Existed: 1940–1948

U.S. Highway 29A (US 29A) was established in 1940 in Kannapolis, North Carolina, as a new alternate routing from what is now the University City area to China Grove. After passing through Concord, it would have a brief reconnection with mainline US 29, before continuing its route through Kannapolis and Landis. In 1948, mainline US 29 was moved back onto the alternate route, thus decommissioning it.

=== Kannapolis alternate route 3 ===
U.S. Highway 29A
- Location: Kannapolis, North Carolina
- Existed: 1948–1997

U.S. Highway 29A (US 29A) was established in 1948 in Kannapolis, North Carolina, as a renumbering of mainline US 29 from what is now the University City area to China Grove, being the third and final alternate route through Kannapolis. In 1953, US 29A was removed south of Concord and rerouted from Church Street to meet back with mainline US 29 along Cabbarrus Avenue (replacing an unconfirmed US 29A-1). The old routing continued as NC 49, except for Old Concord Road; in Concord, Union Street became part of US 601, while Wilshire Avenue and Old Charlotte Road were downgraded. In 1954, US 29A's southern terminus was truncated north of Concord, at US 29/US 601. In July 1997, the entire alternate route was decommissioned.

=== Salisbury alternate route ===
U.S. Highway 29A
- Location: Salisbury, North Carolina
- Length: 0.5 mi (800 m)
- Existed: 1945–1954

U.S. Highway 29A (US 29A) was established around 1945 as a new alternate routing of US 29 in downtown Salisbury, North Carolina. The short alternate loop used Bank, Lee, and Liberty streets. Around 1954, it was decommissioned and replaced by truck routes of US 52 and US 601.

=== Salisbury business loop ===
U.S. Highway 29 Business
- Location: Salisbury, North Carolina
- Existed: 1960–1964

U.S. Highway 29 Business (US 29 Bus.) was established in 1960 in Salisbury, North Carolina, as a renumbering of mainline US 29, which was rerouted east onto a completed section of I-85. The business loop stayed along Main Street in both Salisbury and Spencer, reconnecting north of the Yadkin River. By 1964, the business loop was decommissioned when mainline US 29 reverted to its original alignment.

=== Lexington alternate route ===
U.S. Highway 29A
- Location: Lexington, North Carolina
- Length: 3.8 mi (6.1 km)
- Existed: 1952–1960

U.S. Highway 29A (US 29A) was established in 1952 as a renumbering of US 29 through Lexington, North Carolina, via Main Street. In 1960, it was renumbered as US 29 Bus.

=== Lexington business loop ===
U.S. Highway 29 Business
- Location: Lexington, North Carolina
- Length: 3.8 mi (6.1 km)
- Existed: 1960–2003

U.S. Highway 29 Business (US 29 Bus.) was established in 1960 in Lexington, North Carolina, as a renumbering of US 29A, via Main Street; the entire route was in concurrency with US 70 Bus. The route remained unchanged until September 2003 when it was decommissioned.

=== Thomasville alternate route ===
U.S. Highway 29A
- Location: Thomasville, North Carolina
- Existed: 1952–1957

U.S. Highway 29A (US 29A) was established in 1952 as a renumbering of US 29/US 70 through downtown Thomasville, North Carolina, via Main Street and Turner Road; the entire route was in concurrency with US 70A. In 1957, it was absorbed by US 29A from High Point.

=== Thomasville business loop ===
U.S. Highway 29 Business
- Location: Thomasville, North Carolina
- Existed: 1960–1962

U.S. Highway 29 Business (US 29 Bus.) was established in 1960 was a renumbering of US 29A through downtown Thomasville, North Carolina, via Main Street and Turner Road; the entire route was in concurrency with US 70 Bus. In 1962, it was decommissioned.

=== High Point alternate route 1 ===
U.S. Highway 29A
- Location: High Point, North Carolina
- Existed: 1934–1948

U.S. Highway 29A (US 29A) in High Point, North Carolina, was established in 1934 as a renumbering of NC 10A; the entire route was in concurrency with US 70A. It went north along Westchester Drive then east on Lexington Road/Greensboro Road back to mainline US 29/US 70. Around 1948, this alignment was replaced by mainline US 29/US 70.

=== High Point alternate route 2 ===
U.S. Highway 29A
- Location: High Point, North Carolina
- Existed: 1948–1991

U.S. Highway 29A (US 29A) in High Point, North Carolina, was established around 1948 after a renumbering of the mainline US 29/US 70 switched to follow the first alternate alignment through the city; the entire route was in concurrency with US 70A. The original routing followed English Road, Main Street, and Montlieu Avenue before reconnecting with the mainlines. In 1957, US 29A was extended on both directions: south replacing mainline US 29/US 70 along English Road into Thomasville to combine with its US 29A, via Main Street and Turner Road, while north replacing mainline US 29 through Jamestown and Greensboro. Its concurrency with US 70A was decommissioned that same year. In 1960, US 29A was truncated north of Thomasville, at US 29/US 70, being replaced by US 29 Bus./US 70 Bus. through Thomasville. In 1969, US 29A was rerouted in Greensboro onto Lee Street (NC 6), Murrow Boulevard, and Summit Avenue; part of its former alignment continued on as US 421. In 1977, US 29A was rerouted in High Point to follow Kivett Drive then north onto College Drive/Harrison Street; its old alignment along Main Street became part of US 311. Around 1991, the entire route was decommissioned, most of it becoming secondary, except for English Road continuing as NC 68.

=== Greensboro alternate route ===
U.S. Highway 29A
- Location: Greensboro, North Carolina
- Existed: 1938–1957

U.S. Highway 29A (US 29A) was established in 1938 as a new alternate routing through downtown Greensboro, North Carolina, via Fairground Avenue and Market Street; the entire route was in concurrency with US 70A. By 1949, it was extended south to Lee Street but was moved back to its terminus along Spring Garden Street by 1953. In 1957, it was decommissioned when mainline US 29/US 70 was rerouted onto freeways and its former alignment absorbed by High Point's US 29A.

=== Reidsville alternate route ===
U.S. Highway 29A
- Location: Reidsville, North Carolina
- Length: 5.3 mi (8.5 km)
- Existed: 1957–1960

U.S. Highway 29A (US 29A) was established in 1957 as a renumbering of mainline US 29 through downtown Reidsville, North Carolina, via Scales Avenue and Madison Street. In 1960, it was renumbered as US 29 Bus.

=== Reidsville business loop 1 ===
U.S. Highway 29 Business
- Location: Reidsville, North Carolina
- Length: 5.3 mi (8.5 km)
- Existed: 1960–1973

U.S. Highway 29 Business (US 29 Bus.) was established in 1960 as a renumbering of US 29A through downtown Reidsville, North Carolina, via Madison Street and Scales Avenue. It remained unchanged until 1973, when it was decommissioned after the completion of a new eastern bypass of US 29 and its old western bypass became the second US 29 business loop in Reidsville.

=== Reidsville business loop 2 ===
U.S. Highway 29 Business
- Location: Reidsville, North Carolina
- Length: 16.5 mi (26.6 km)
- Existed: 1973–present

U.S. Highway 29 Business (US 29 Bus.) was established in 1973 when US 29 was rerouted onto new freeway bypassing east of Reidsville, North Carolina. The current business loop alignment was originally the first bypass going west around Reidsville, established in 1957. The entire route is two lanes, with a medium at some locations and interchanges at major junctions.

=== Pelham–Danville business route ===
U.S. Route 29 Business
- Location: Pelham, North Carolina–Danville, Virginia

== Virginia ==
=== Danville alternate route 1 ===
U.S. Route 29 Alternate
- Location: Danville, Virginia
- Existed: 1936–1941

U.S. Route 29 Alternate (US 29 Alt.) was established in 1936 as new primary routing in downtown Danville, Virginia. It began originally at the US 29/State Route 86 (SR 86) then going north along Wilson Street and crossing the Dan River on the Worsham Street Bridge before reconnecting with the mainline. In 1938, it was extended south, connecting with mainline US 29 at Howeland Circle. The alternate route was decommissioned when a new alternate route was established bypassing the city of Danville. The complete list of city streets used are: Howeland Circle, Avondale Drive (which becomes Watson Street), Stokes Street, Jefferson Street, Green Street (which becomes Newton Street), Bridge Street, Wilson Street, and Worsham Street.

=== Danville alternate route 2 ===
U.S. Route 29 Alternate
- Location: Danville, Virginia
- Existed: 1941–1970

U.S. Route 29 Alternate (US 29 Alt.) was established in 1941 as a renumbering of SR 125 and as a bypass of downtown Danville, Virginia. It originally began at the intersection of US 29/SR 125 (today Main Street at Bishop Road), going north onto Piedmont Drive/Piney Forest Road before reconnecting with mainline US 29, just north of SR 41. In May 1943, the alternate route was moved from Bishop Road to Memorial Drive to reconnect to mainline US 29. In December 1970, the alternate route was decommissioned, replaced by mainline US 29.

=== Danville business loop 1 ===
U.S. Route 29 Business
- Location: Danville, Virginia
- Length: 7.0 mi (11.3 km)
- Existed: 1970–1998

U.S. Route 29 Business (US 29 Bus.) was established in December 1970 as a renumbering of mainline US 29 through downtown Danville, Virginia, via Main Street. In 1998, it was renumbered as SR 293 after mainline US 29 was moved onto a new bypass southwest around the city and its former alignment along Memorial Drive/Central Boulevard/Piney Forest Road became the second business loop through Danville.

=== Danville business loop 2 ===
U.S. Route 29 Business
- Location: Danville, Virginia
- Length: 14.4 mi (23.2 km)
- Existed: 1996–present

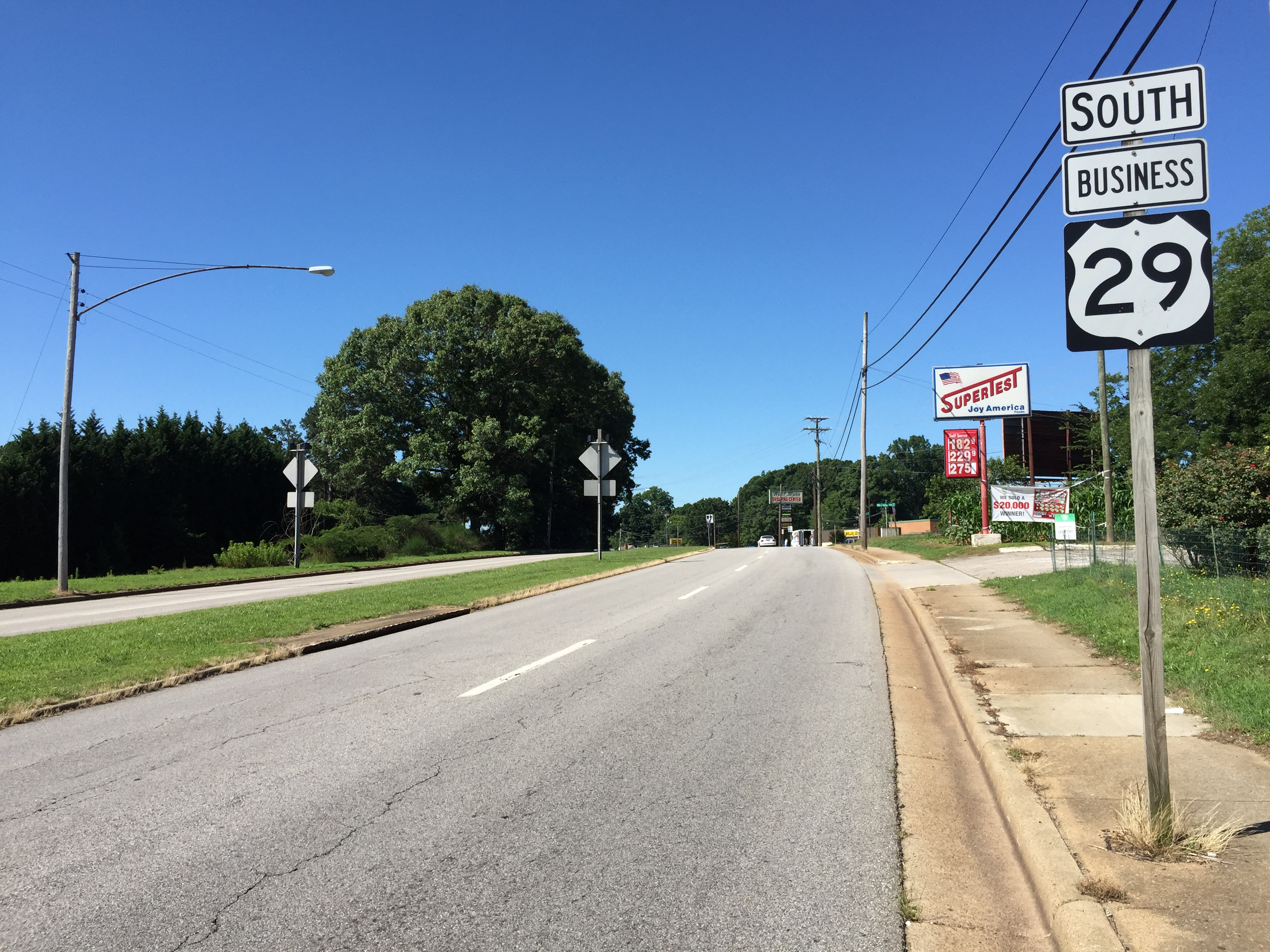
View south along US 29 Bus. in Danville, Virginia

U.S. Route 29 Business (US 29 Bus.) was the second incarnation of the business loop through Danville, Virginia, that was established in April 1996, following the old alignment of US 29 through downtown Danville after the Danville Expressway was constructed. The business loop begins just south of the state line in North Carolina, which continues straight along West Main Street. It switches onto Memorial Drive and then onto Central Boulevard, via a cloverleaf interchange. Continuing north, the road name changes to Piney Forest Road, reconnecting with mainline US 29 near Blairs. The entire route is four lanes.

=== Chatham business loop ===
U.S. Route 29 Business
- Location: Chatham, Virginia
- Length: 3.4 mi (5.5 km)
- Existed: 1965–present

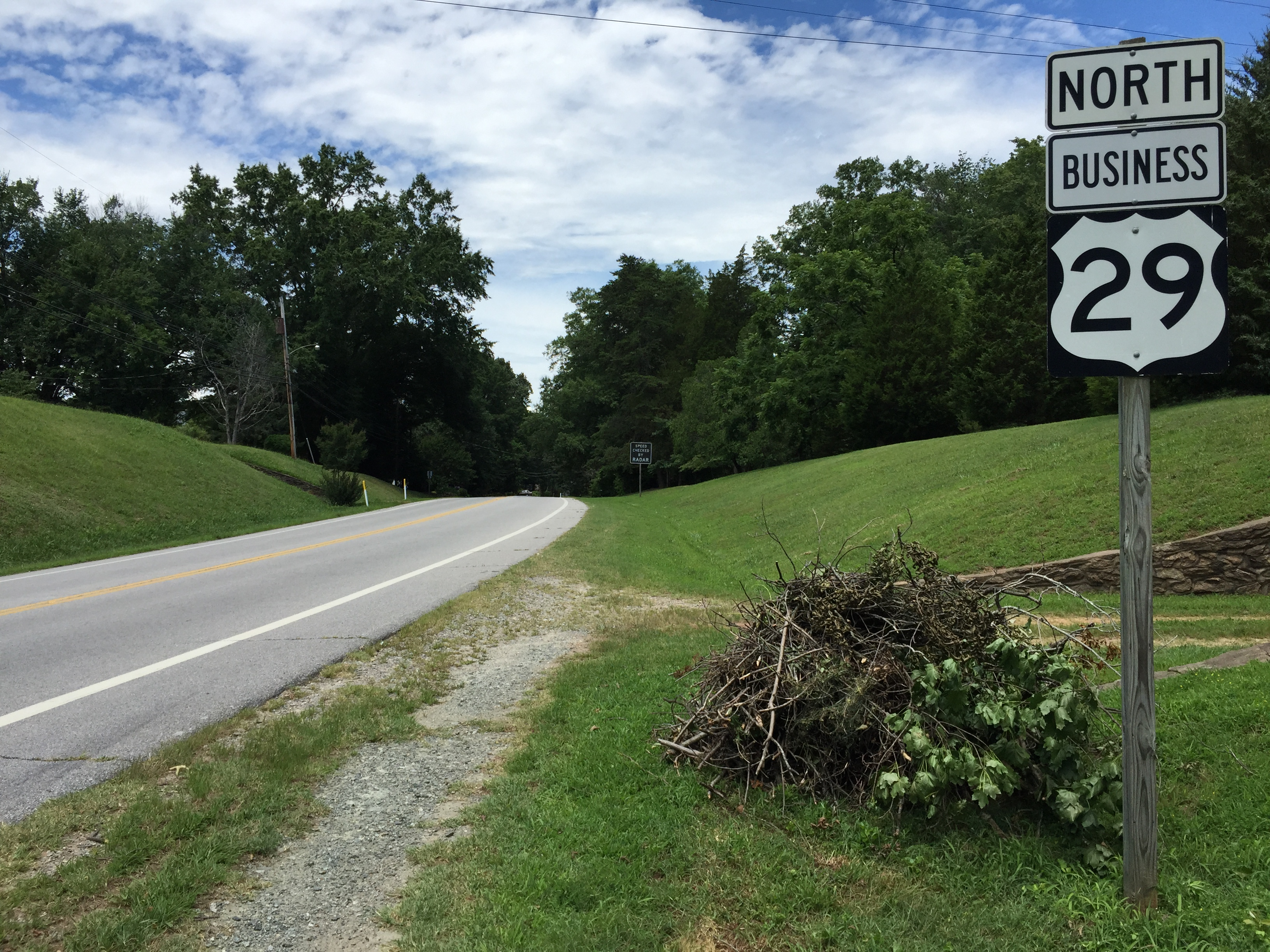
View north along US 29 Bus. at SR 1427 in Chatham, Virginia

U.S. Route 29 Business (US 29 Bus.) through Chatham, Virginia, was established in 1965 when mainline US 29 was given a new bypass east of the town. This two-lane business loop goes through downtown Chatham, via Main Street.

=== Gretna business loop ===
U.S. Route 29 Business
- Location: Gretna, Virginia
- Length: 4.0 mi (6.4 km)
- Existed: 1975–present

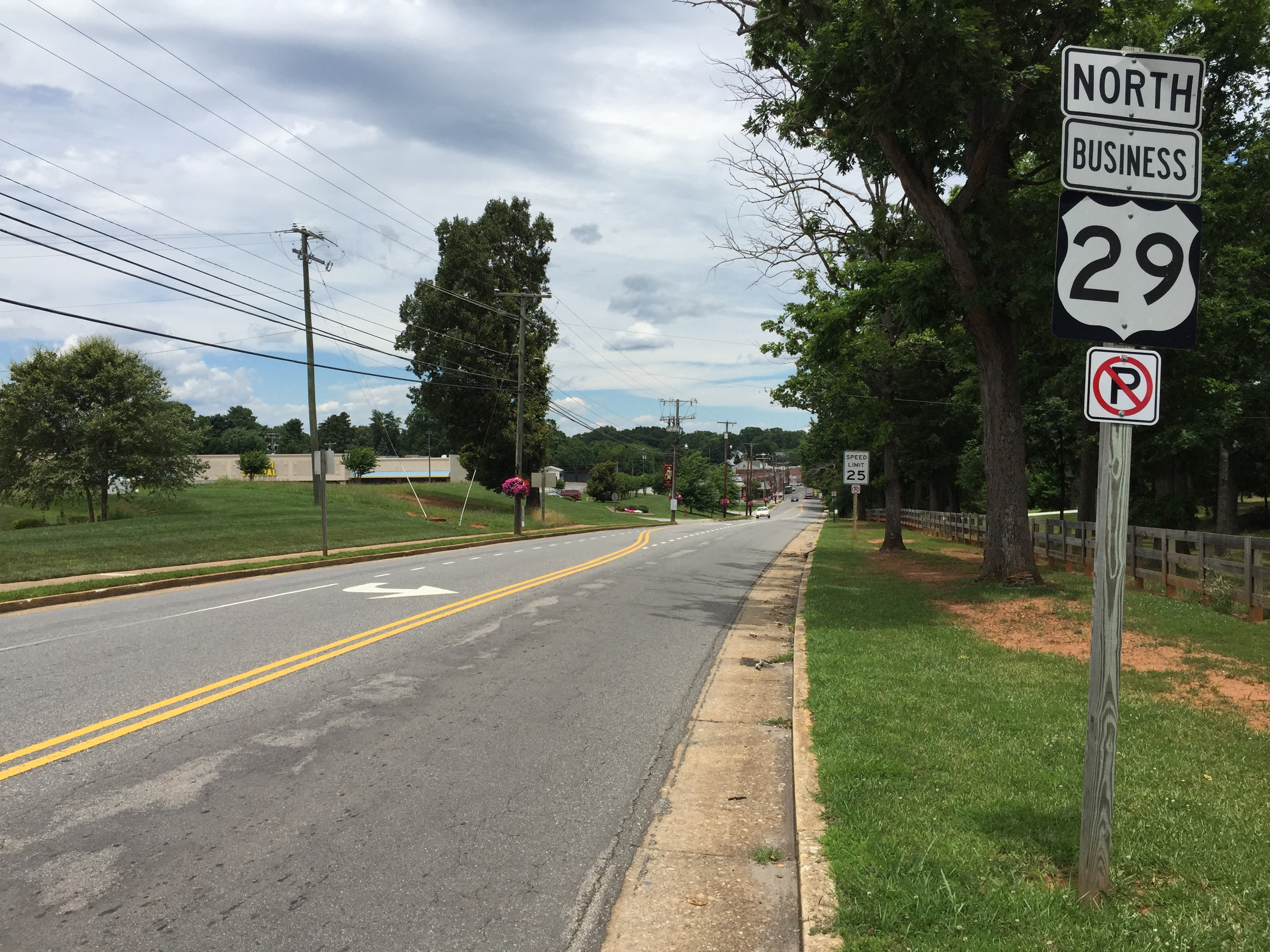
View north along US 29 Bus. at SR 40 in Gretna, Virginia

U.S. Route 29 Business (US 29 Bus.) through Gretna, Virginia, was established in 1975 when mainline US 29 was given a new bypass west of the town. This two-lane business loop goes through downtown Gretna, via Main Street.

=== Hurt–Altavista business loop ===
U.S. Route 29 Business
- Location: Hurt–Altavista, Virginia
- Length: 6.5 mi (10.5 km)
- Existed: 1974–present

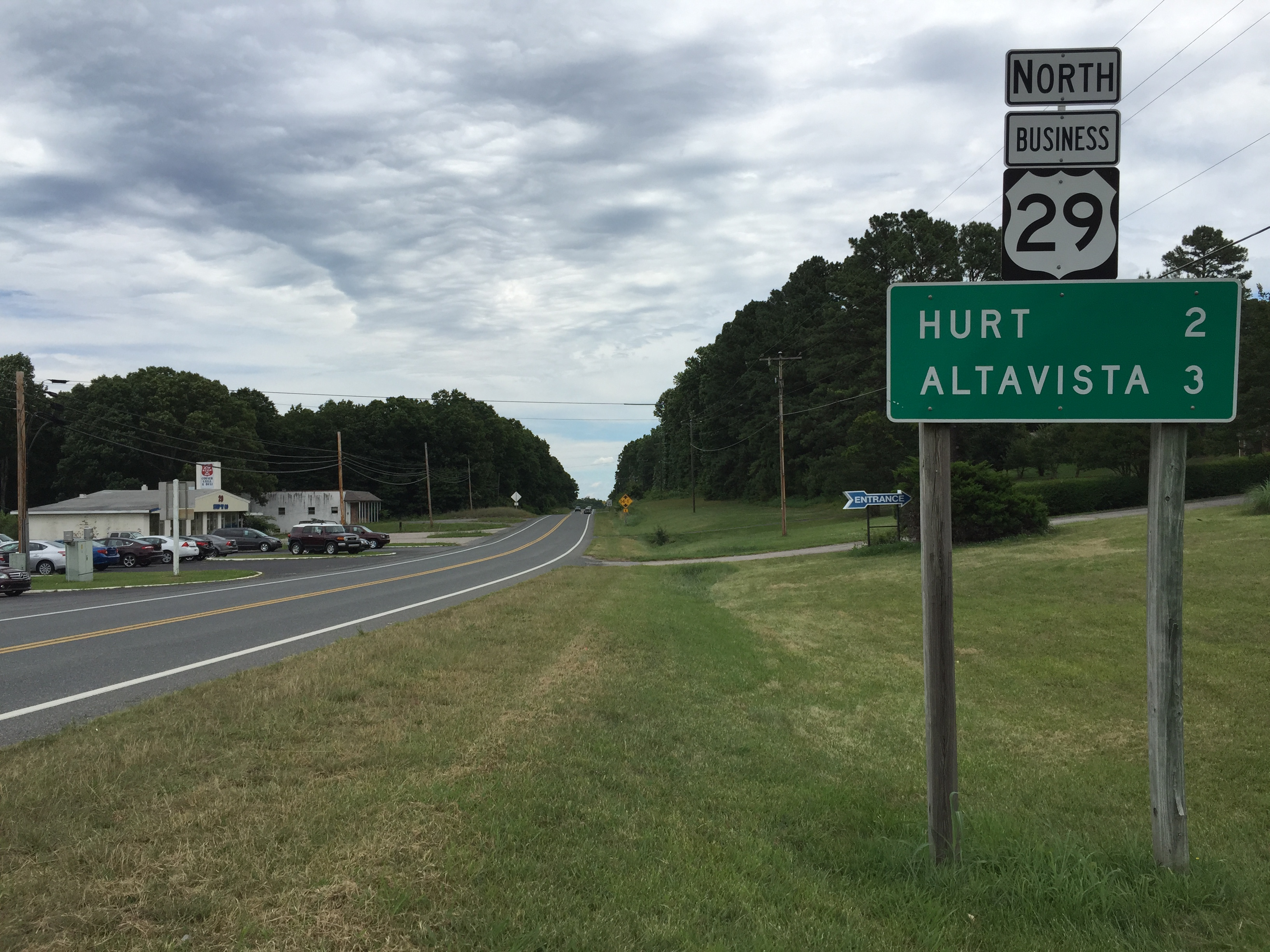
View north along US 29 Bus. just south of Hurt, Virginia

U.S. Route 29 Business (US 29 Bus.) through the towns of Hurt and Altavista, Virginia, was established in 1974 when mainline US 29 was given a new bypass west of both towns. This two-lane business loop goes through downtown Hurt and Altavista, via Main Street.

=== Lynchburg alternate route ===
U.S. Route 29 Alternate
- Location: Lynchburg, Virginia
- Existed: 1947–1971

U.S. Route 29 Alternate (US 29 Alt.) in Lynchburg, Virginia, was established around 1947 as a new alternate routing from mainline US 29 from Fort Avenue to 12th Street then Main Street back to mainline US 29 at the bridge crossing the James River. In 1955, it was extended north into Madison Heights, ending at Amherst Highway and the Lynchburg Expressway. In 1959, it was extended south to Wards Road and the Lynchburg Expressway; both extensions were due to mainline US 29 moving more onto the Lynchburg Expressway after each completed phase. In 1971, it was renumbered as US 29 Bus.

=== Lynchburg business loop ===
U.S. Route 29 Business
- Location: Lynchburg, Virginia
- Length: 6.7 mi (10.8 km)
- Existed: 1971–2005

U.S. Route 29 Business (US 29 Bus.) was established in 1971 as a renumbering of US 29 Alt. through downtown Lynchburg, Virginia, via Memorial Drive, 5th Street, Main Street, and 7th Street over the James River. In 1988, the James River crossing was moved from Main and 7th streets to 5th Street. In October 2005, the business loop was renumbered as SR 163 after mainline US 29 was moved onto a new bypass east of the city, and its former alignment along the Lynchburg Expressway became an extension of another existing business loop from Amherst.

=== Lynchburg–Amherst business loop ===
U.S. Route 29 Business
- Location: Lynchburg-Amherst, Virginia
- Length: 22.3 mi (35.9 km)
- Existed: 1969–present

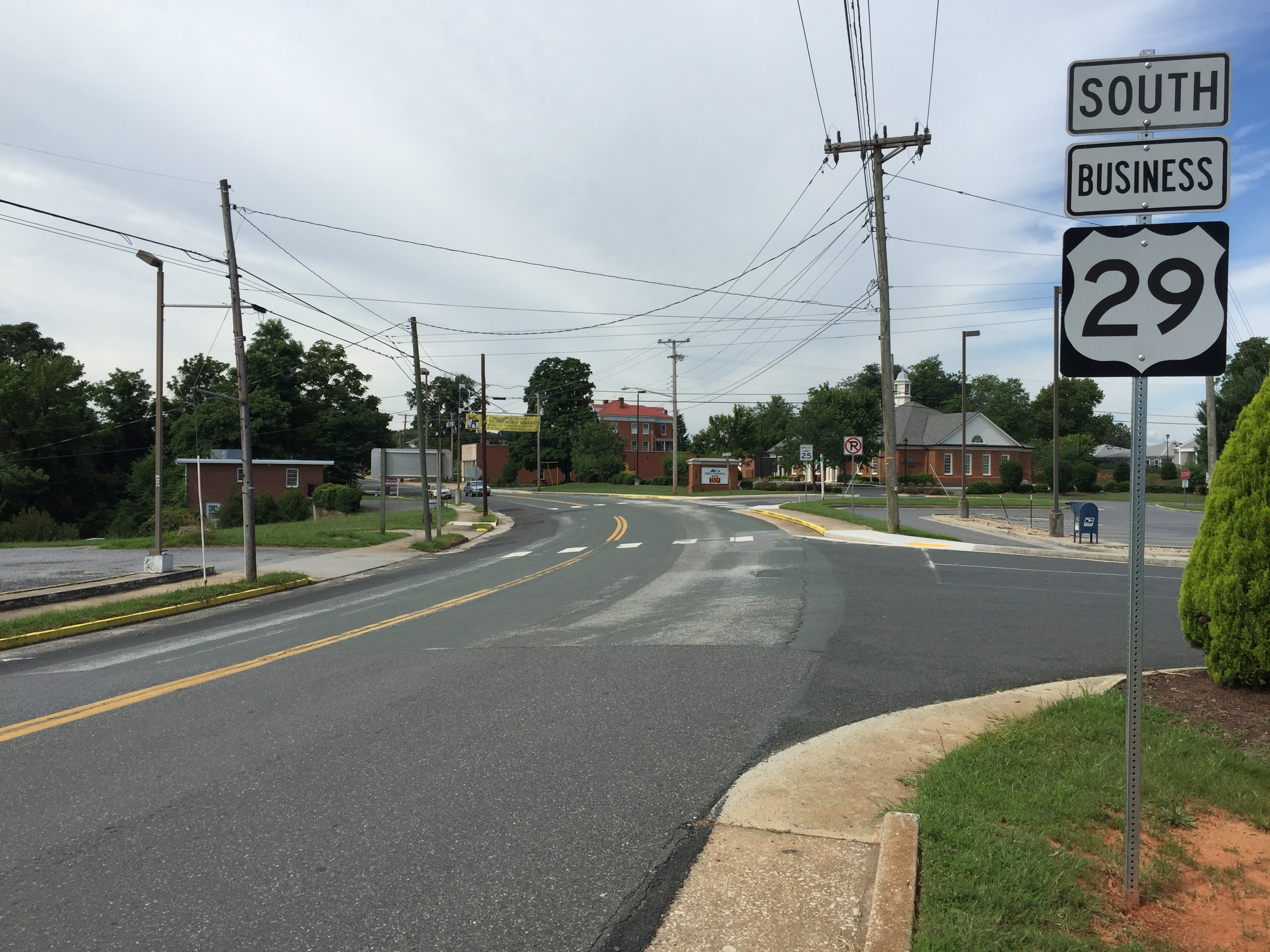
View south along US 29 Bus. at US 60 in Amherst, Virginia

U.S. Route 29 Business (US 29 Bus.) through Amherst, Virginia, was established in 1969 when mainline US 29 was given a new bypass east of the town. In October 2005, the business route was extended south through Madison Heights and Lynchburg when the bypass was extended further south. Starting from its southern terminus, it goes north along Wards Road, a four-lane divided highway, which borders Liberty University. Switching onto the Lynchburg Expressway (exit 9), it continues as a freeway through Lynchburg until reaching Madison Heights, where it has a diamond interchange with SR 210 (Old Town Connector). Just after a partial diamond interchange with SR 163, it becomes a four-lane divided roadway. Shortly, it intersects the northern terminus of SR 163, taking the state route's name, Amherst Highway. Continuing north, it eventually makes the first reconnect with US 29 at an interchange. The business loop continues north after the interchange, reducing down to a two-lane highway through Amherst as Main Street. Northeast of Amherst, it makes a final reconnection with US 29, via a folded diamond interchange.

=== Lovingston business loop ===
U.S. Route 29 Business
- Location: Lovingston, Virginia
- Length: 0.9 mi (1,400 m)
- Existed: 1969–present

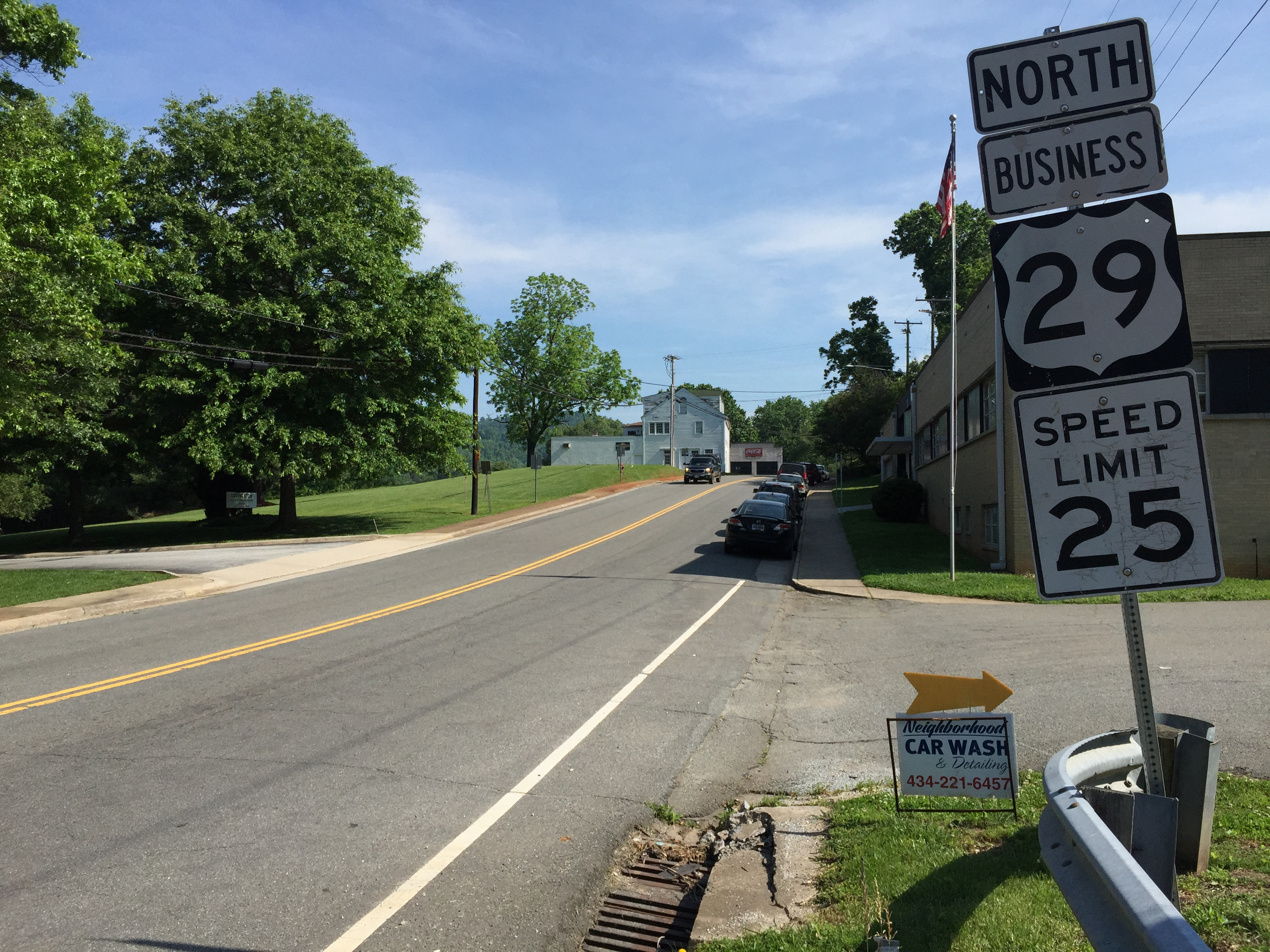
View north along US 29 Bus. north of SR 56 in Lovingston, Virginia

U.S. Route 29 Business (US 29 Bus.) through Lovingston, Virginia, was established in 1969 when mainline US 29 was given a new bypass west of the town. This two-lane business loop goes through downtown Lovingston, via Front Street.

=== Charlottesville business loop ===
U.S. Route 29 Business
- Location: Charlottesville, Virginia
- Length: 3.4 mi (5.5 km)
- Existed: 1966–present

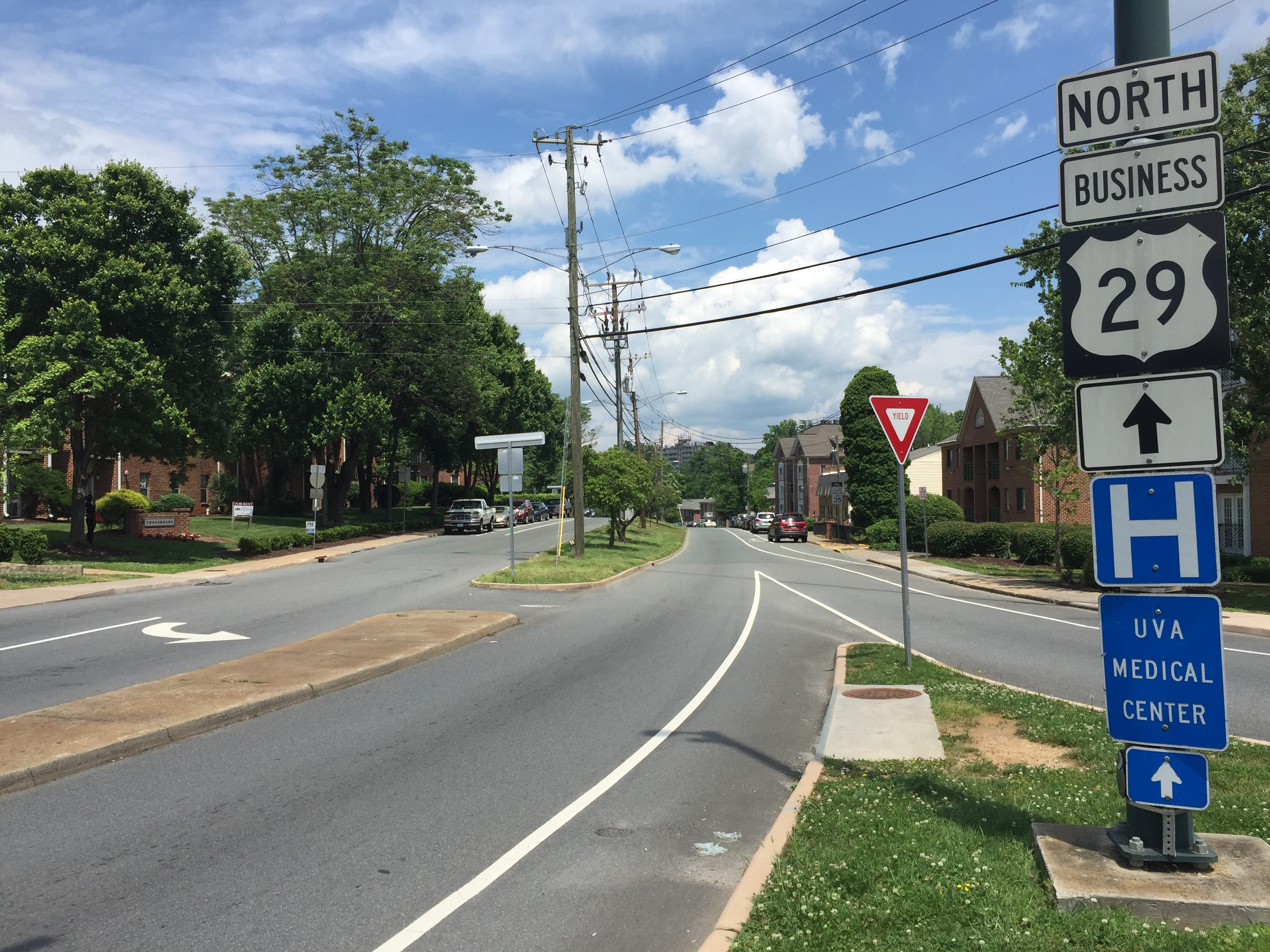
View north along US 29 Bus. in Charlottesville, Virginia

U.S. Route 29 Business (US 29 Bus.) through Charlottesville, Virginia, was established in 1966 when mainline US 29 was given a new bypass west of the city. It starts east on a divided two-lane highway known as Fontaine Avenue. Switching onto Emmet Street, it goes through the campus of the University of Virginia, on a two-lane highway with a turn lane, expanding into a divided four-lane highway before reconnecting with mainline US 29.

=== Madison business loop ===
U.S. Route 29 Business
- Location: Madison, Virginia
- Length: 2.0 mi (3.2 km)
- Existed: 1962–present

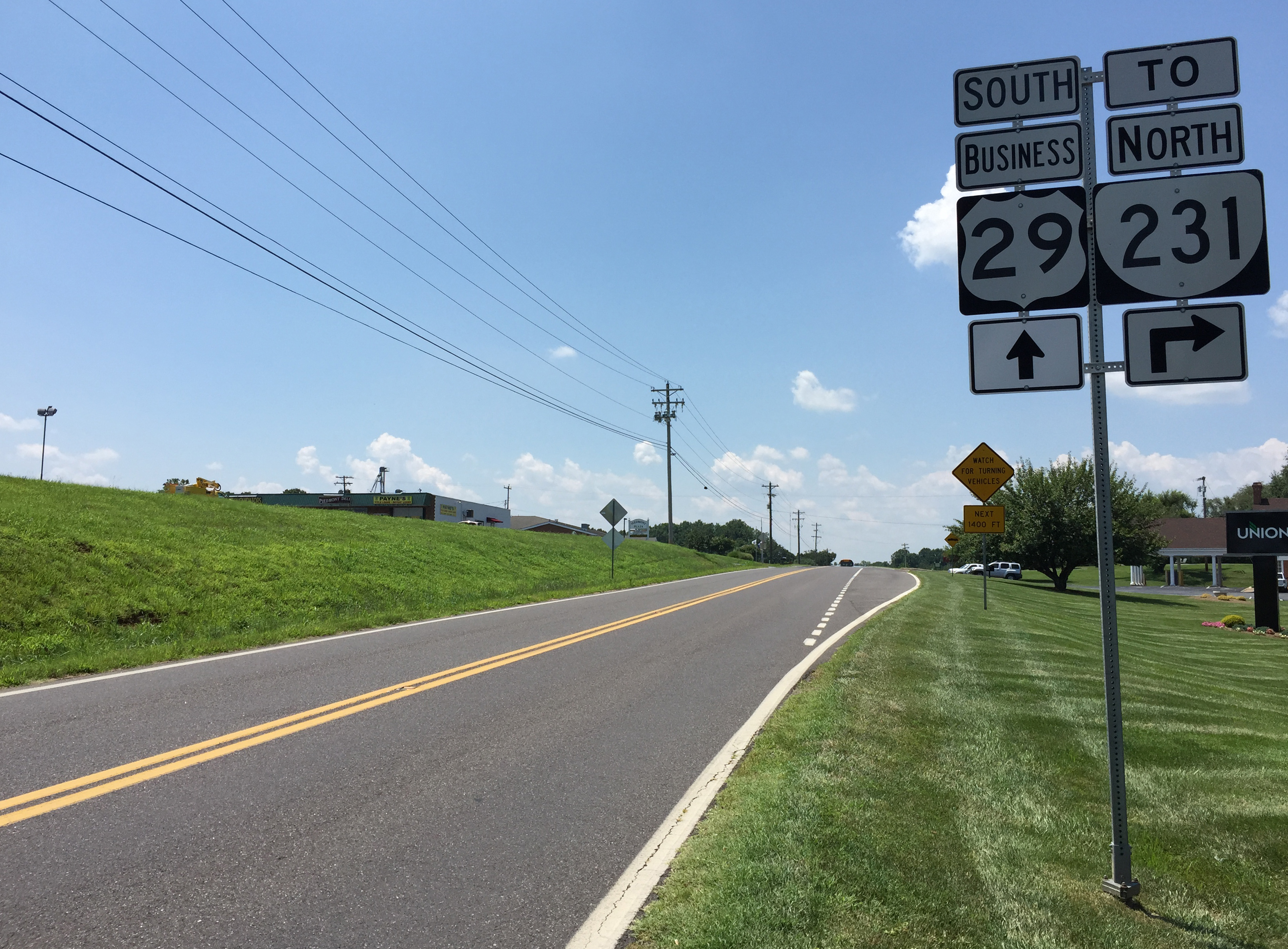
View south along US 29 Bus. near Madison, Virginia

U.S. Route 29 Business (US 29 Bus.) through Madison, Virginia, was established in 1962 when mainline US 29 was given a new bypass east of the town. This short two-mile (3.2 km) two-lane highway has not changed since, going through Madison via Main Street.

=== Culpeper business loop ===
U.S. Route 29 Business
- Location: Culpeper, Virginia
- Length: 5.8 mi (9.3 km)
- Existed: 1973–present
- Tourist routes: Journey Through Hallowed Ground Byway; Virginia Byway

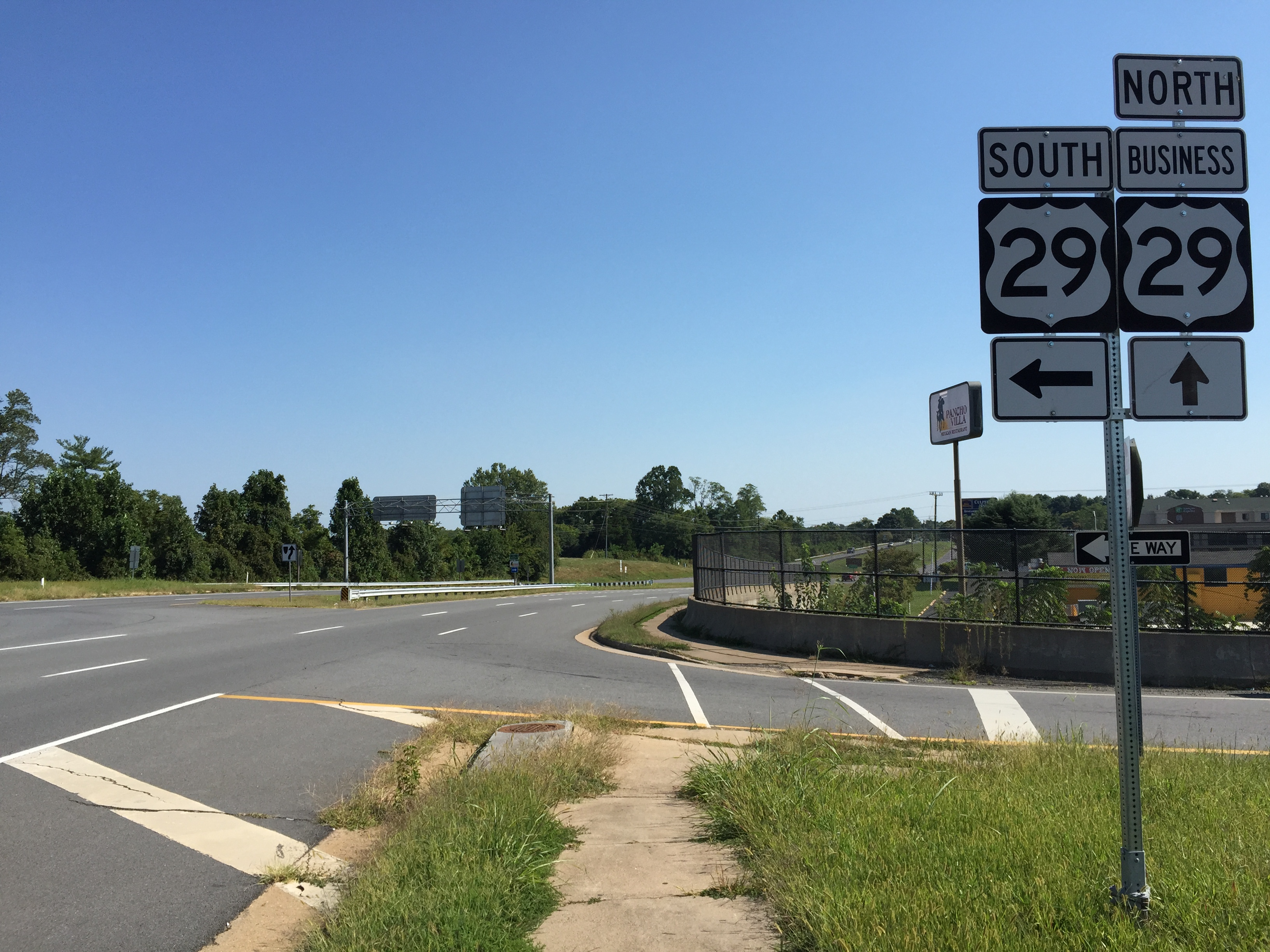
View north along US 29 Bus. at US 29 in Culpeper, Virginia

U.S. Route 29 Business (US 29 Bus.) through Culpeper, Virginia, was established in 1973 when mainline US 29 was rerouted onto new expressway, bypassing south then east around Culpeper. Following the original alignment, it begins as a divided four-lane highway (Madison Road) going into the downtown area, where it meets with US 522 and US 15 Bus. Going through the downtown area along Main Street, it soon widens back out as a four-lane divided highway, called James Madison Highway, in the northern section of town. Leaving the city limits, it becomes a two-lane highway before reconnecting with mainline US 15/US 29.

=== Remington business loop ===
U.S. Route 29 Business
- Location: Remington, Virginia
- Length: 2.7 mi (4.3 km)
- Existed: 1975–present
- Tourist routes: Journey Through Hallowed Ground Byway; Virginia Byway

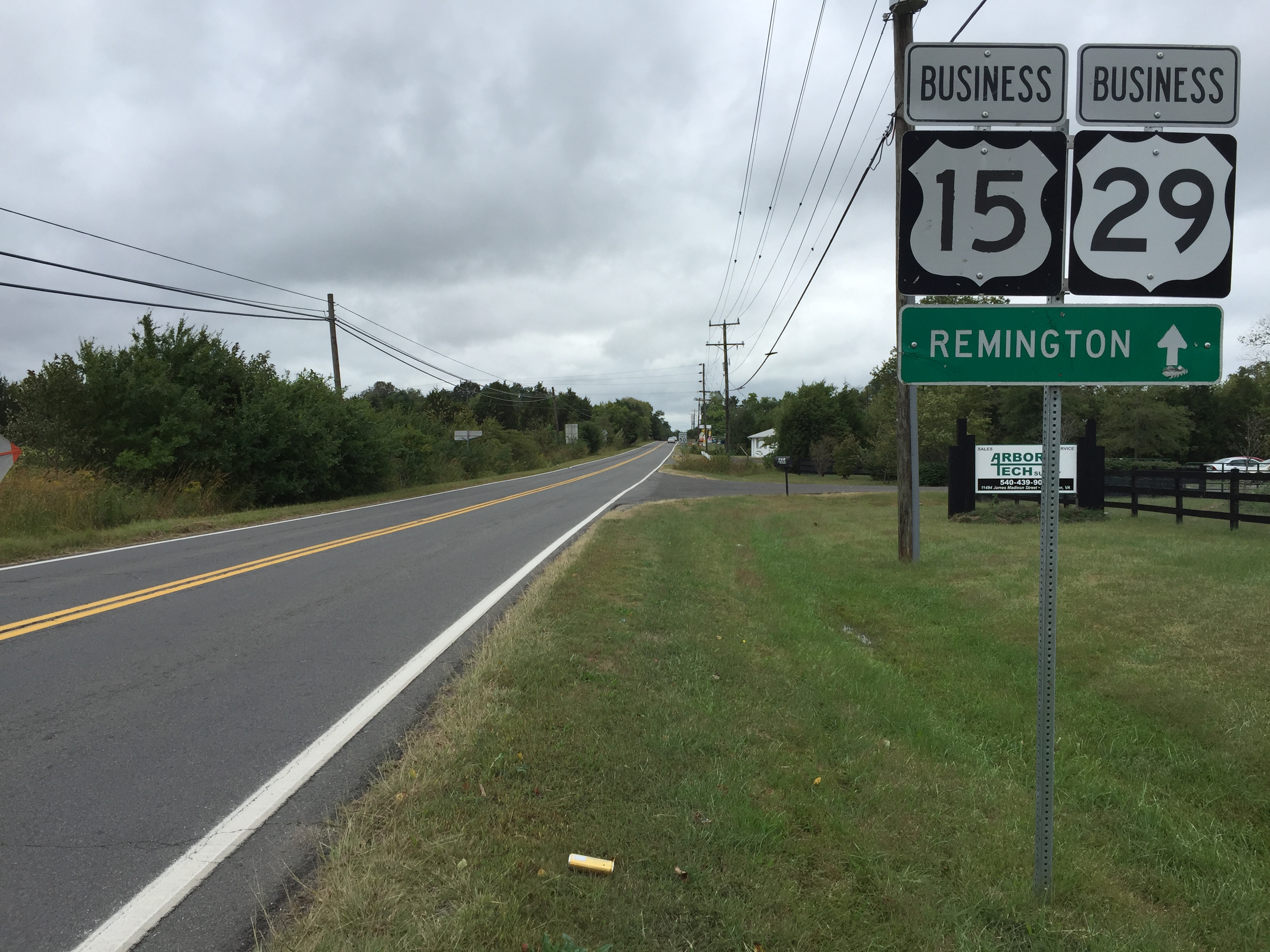
View south along US 15 Bus. and US 29 Bus. south of US 15/US 29 just north of Remington, Virginia

U.S. Route 29 Business (US 29 Bus.) through Remington, Virginia, which shares a complete concurrency with US 15 Bus., was established in 1975 when mainline US 15/US 29 was given a new bypass west of the town. This two-lane business loop goes through downtown Remington, via Remington Road in Culpeper County and James Madison Road in Fauquier County.

=== Warrenton business loop ===
U.S. Route 29 Business
- Location: Warrenton, Virginia
- Length: 4.9 mi (7.9 km)
- Existed: 1986–present
- Tourist routes: Journey Through Hallowed Ground Byway; Virginia Byway

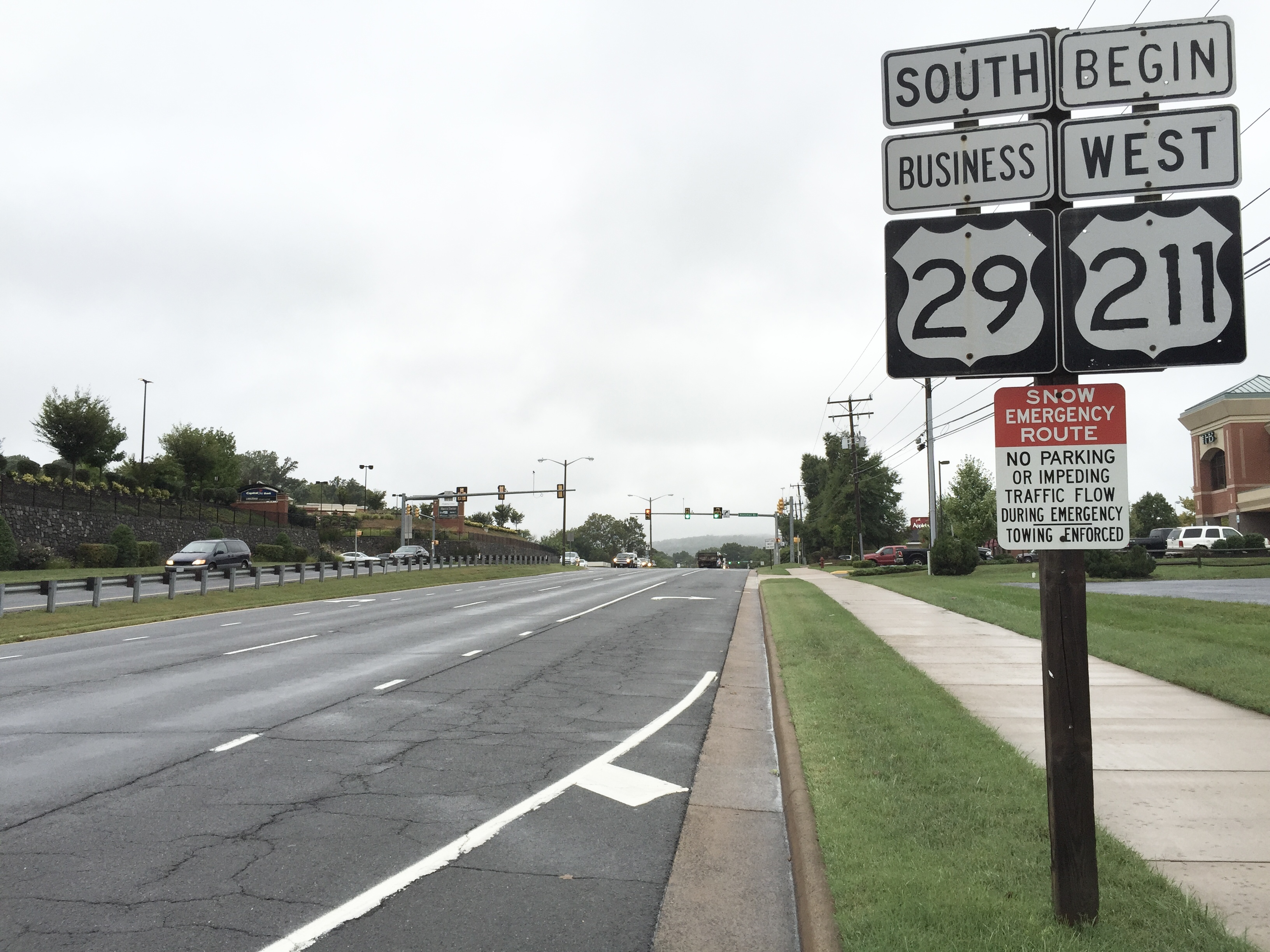
View south along US 29 Bus. at the east end of US 211 in Warrenton, Virginia

U.S. Route 29 Business (US 29 Bus.) in Warrenton, Virginia, is also multiplexed with US 15 Bus. and US 17 Bus., at least at the southern end. After James Madison Highway becomes Shirley Avenue, US 15 Bus. leaves this concurrency at Falmouth Street. US 211 joins the two business routes as US 211 Bus. runs east along Waterloo Street and US 17 Bus./US 29 Bus./US 211 become Broadview Avenue. As the triplex curves right, and intersects Roebling Street, it becomes the Lee Highway, and US 17 Bus. makes a left turn onto Broadview Avenue. US 29 Bus. and US 211 continue on the Lee Highway until the latter terminates at the junction with US 15 Bus. (Blackwell Road). US 15 Bus. and US 29 Bus. continue along the Lee Highway until terminating at the interchange with mainline US 15 and US 29. The business loop was established in 1986 when mainline US 29 was realigned on new expressway east of the city.

== See also ==
- List of special routes of the United States Numbered Highway System
