= North Carolina Highway 275 =

State highway in Gaston County, North Carolina, US

North Carolina Highway 275

Route information
- Maintained by NCDOT
- Length: 10.7 mi (17.2 km)
- Existed: 1930–present

Major junctions
- West end: NC 274 near Bessemer City
- US 321 in Dallas
- East end: NC 27 in Stanley

Location
- Country: United States
- State: North Carolina
- Counties: Gaston

Highway system
- North Carolina Highway System; Interstate; US; State; Scenic
← NC 274	→ US 276

North Carolina Highway 275 (NC 275) is a primary state highway in the U.S. state of North Carolina. It connects the cities of Bessemer City, Dallas, and Stanley.

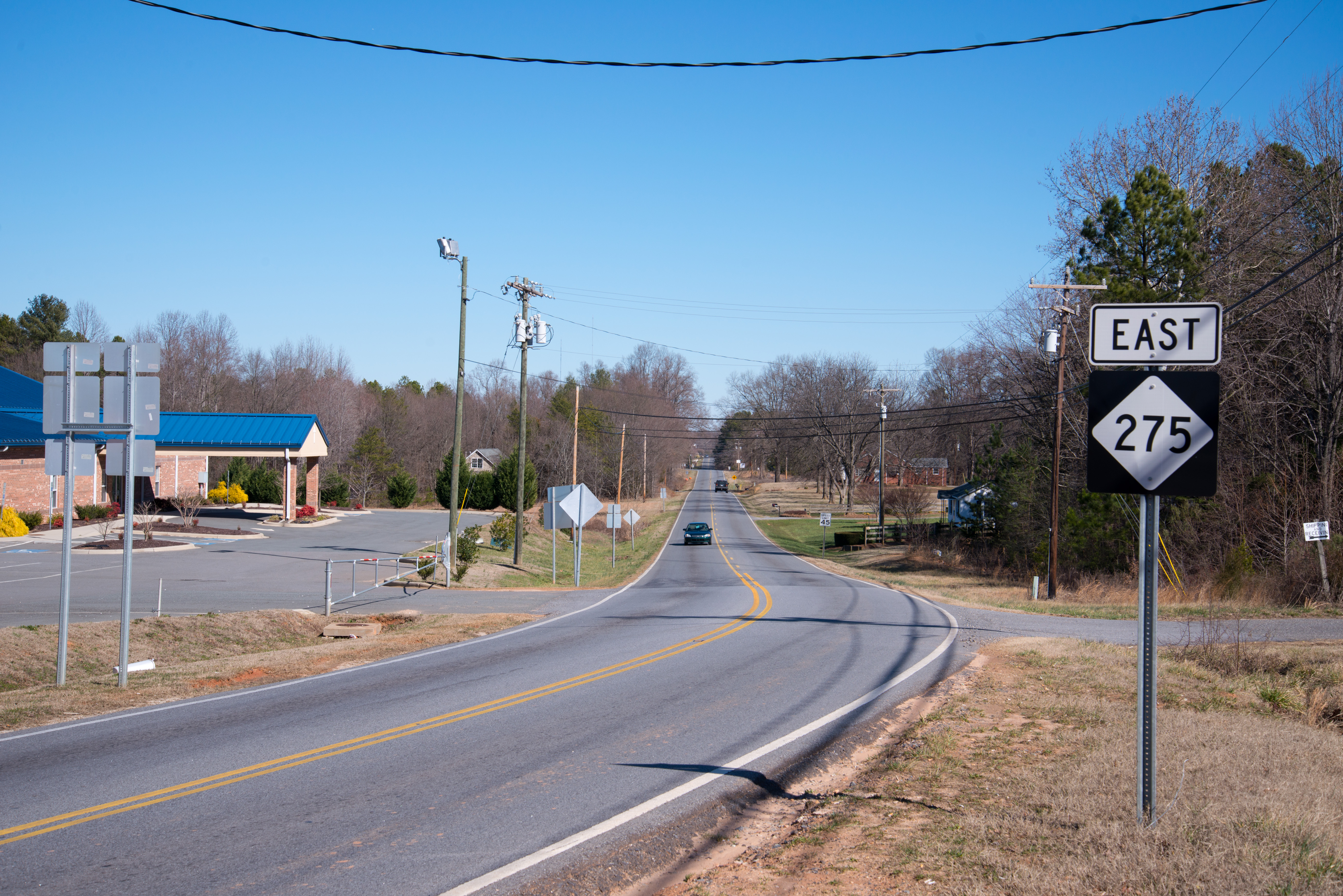
East NC 275 in Gastonia

== History ==
The highway was established in 1930 as a new primary routing from U.S. Route 74 (US 74) and NC 20 (now NC 274) near Bessemer City to NC 27 in Stanley. The route has changed little since.

== Junction list ==
The entire route is in Gaston County.

Location	mi	km	Destinations	Notes
Gastonia	0.0	0.0	NC 274 (Bessemer City Road) – Bessemer City, Gastonia	
Dallas	3.0	4.8	NC 279 north (Dallas-Cherryville Highway) – Cherryville	West end of NC 279 overlap
Dallas	3.7	6.0	US 321 Bus. north (Dallas-High Shoals Highway) – High Shoals	West end of US 321 Bus. overlap
Dallas	3.8	6.1	US 321 / US 321 Bus. ends – Gastonia, Lincolnton, Hickory	Exit 12A–B (US 321); east end of US 321 Bus. overlap
Dallas	5.0	8.0	NC 279 south (Lower Dallas Highway) – Gastonia	East end of NC 279 overlap
Stanley	10.7	17.2	NC 27 (Main Street) – Lincolnton, Mount Holly	
1.000 mi = 1.609 km; 1.000 km = 0.621 mi: Concurrency terminus
