= Eastridge Mall (Gastonia) =

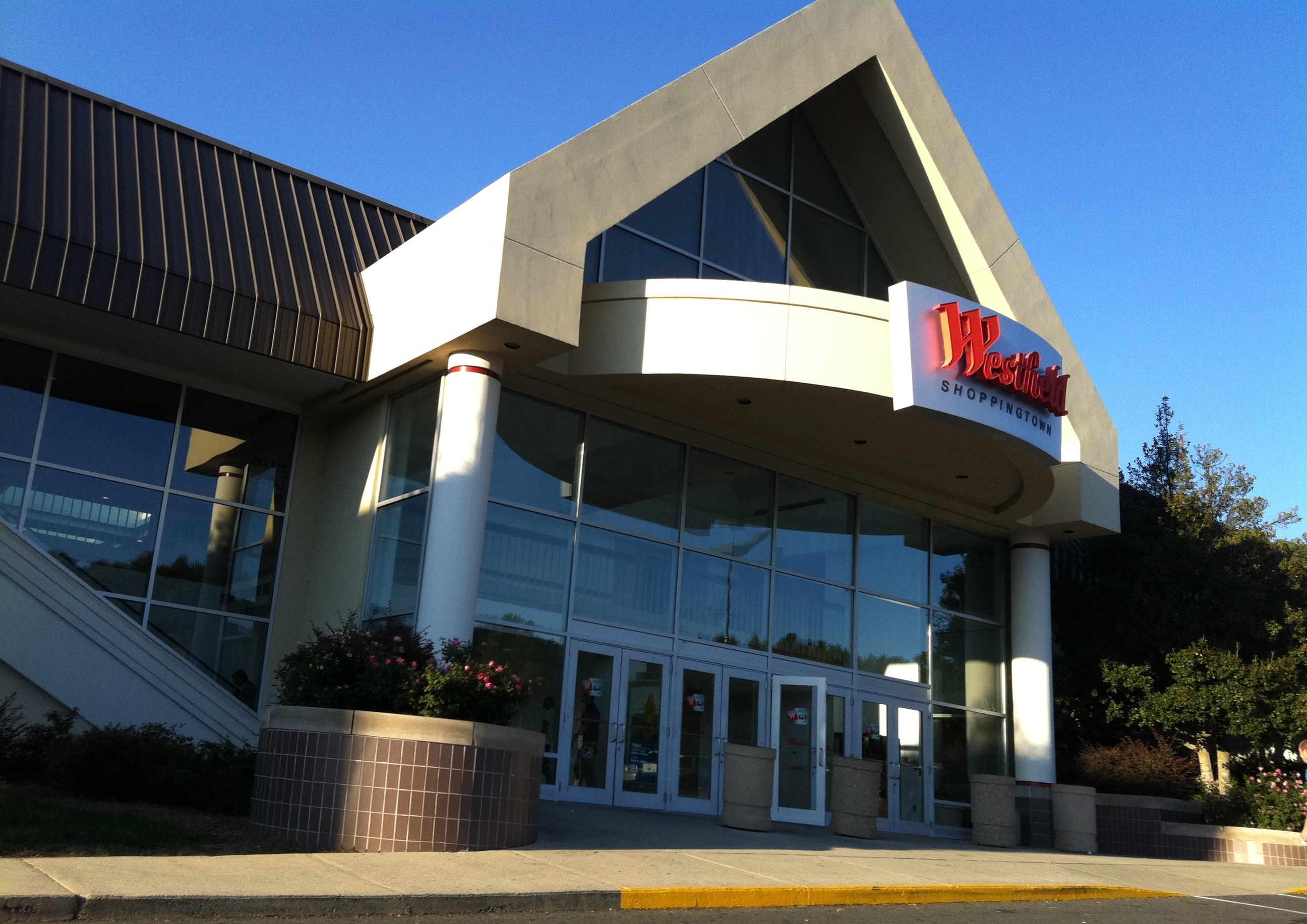
- Entrance to Eastridge Mall, October 2011
- Location: Gastonia, North Carolina, United States
- Coordinates: 35.2649°N 81.1478°W
- Address: 246 North New Hope Road
- Opened: 1976
- Developer: Carlson Properties
- Owner: CityView Commercial, LLC
- Num. of stores: Around 70
- Num. of anchor tenants: 4 (2 open, 2 vacant)
- Floor area: 919,557 sq ft (85,429.6 m^{2})
- Floors: 3 (3rd floor vacant)
- Parking: 4,214
- Website: eastridgemallgastonia.com

Eastridge Mall (formerly known as Westfield Eastridge) is a regional shopping mall located in Gastonia, North Carolina, and is 19 miles (31 km) west of uptown Charlotte, North Carolina. Opened in 1976, it is located off Interstate 85 at exit 20, N. New Hope Road (North Carolina Highway 279), and the mall houses around 70 stores.

As part of the mall's sale, the mall reverted to its former name, Eastridge Mall.

== History ==
Eastridge Mall was developed in 1976 by Carlson Properties on the site of the former Rhyne Dairy Farm. In January 1989, Jacobs, Visconsi & Jacobs Co. purchased Eastridge Mall from Carlson Real Estate Co. of Minneapolis for an undisclosed sum. Jacobs, Visconsi & Jacobs had managed Eastridge Mall since 1984. In August 1999, the Richard E. Jacobs Group Inc. announced that it was putting Eastridge Mall — and nearly 40 other malls — up for sale. In April 2002, Sydney, Australia-based Westfield America Trust bought Eastridge Mall and eight other shopping centers across the United States from the Richard E. Jacobs Group for a combined purchase price of US$756 million. This latest purchase triggered a name change from Eastridge Mall to Westfield Shoppingtown Eastridge on April 26, 2002. Dropping the "Shoppingtown" moniker from the mall name in June 2005, however the signs still have the "Shoppingtown" moniker in it. After 2006, it was the last mall in the state of North Carolina owned by Westfield America.

On September 17, 2013, Westfield reached an agreement to sell Eastridge to CityView Commercial, LLC of Brooklyn, New York for an undisclosed sum. As part of the sale, the "Westfield" was dropped from the mall's name, and "Shoppingtown" was dropped from the mall's sign, with the mall becoming once again Eastridge Mall.

=== Renovation ===
The mall's first significant renovation since opening in 1976 began with expansion that started in April 1996. A new JCPenney location was built, the old building demolished and replaced by a new location for Dillard's, and Sears moved into the old Dillard's location. To make room for some of the new construction while maintaining the same number of parking spaces, and with the approval of the Gastonia City Council, the mall reduced the width of the most distant 20 percent of the mall's parking slots from 9 feet (2.7 m) to 8 feet 6 inches (2.59 m). The mall's interior was updated, new exterior mall entrances were built, floors and fixtures were replaced, and a relocated food court was opened. While work on the new anchor locations would continue into 1999, principal renovation of the mall interior was completed in November 1998.

Although the mall was acquired by Westfield America, and renamed the mall Westfield Shoppingtown Eastridge in April 2002, the exterior signs still said "Eastridge Mall" in February 2004. The last trace of the mall's original name was finally erased in August 2004 when a large "Eastridge Mall" pole sign along Interstate 85 was removed.

New owner CityView Commercial replaced the "Westfield Eastridge" signage with Eastridge Mall signs, by the end of September 2013.

Since 2020, The mall has faced severe decline, losing major national retailers, anchor stores, and seeing large portions of the building, including parts of the first floor and upper levels, shuttered or occupied mostly by non-retail services.

== Former features ==
=== Eastridge IV Cinemas ===
This four-screen movie theater, located on the second level of the mall since it opened in 1976, was last owned by Carmike Cinemas. The theater was closed on January 8, 1998, and a nearby Radio Shack relocated, to make way for construction of a new food court as part of the mall's late-1990s renovation. In August 2004, the mall added an 800 sq ft (74 m^{2}) Family Lounge near the food court that includes private nursing stations, bottle warmers, a microwave oven, a large-screen TV, and leather seating.

=== Jeepers! ===
The mall's third floor, vacant since the food court was relocated to a new space on the second floor in November 1998, reopened in December 2004 with 80% of the floor space occupied by a "Jeepers!" theme park restaurant. This 28,000 sq ft (2,600 m^{2}) tenant, featuring games, a playground, a diner, party rooms and amusement rides, held its grand opening on January 14–17, 2005. Jeepers! also featured a steel sitdown roller coaster known as Python Pit. Because of the low ceilings and other space considerations, this roller coaster had a maximum height requirement of 63 inches (1.6 m). This Jeepers! location closed in early 2006. The roller coaster was relocated to Go-Karts Plus in Williamsburg, Virginia, in 2007.

== Anchors ==
=== Current anchors ===
- Belk, formerly Matthews Belk, is an original anchor tenant of the mall. While the other anchor stores relocated during the late-1990s renovations, Matthews Belk anchor remained in place but underwent extensive interior renovation.
- Dillard's originally opened as Ivey's alongside the mall. In May 1990, the entire Ivey's chain was acquired by Dillard's which promptly rebranded the Eastridge store with the Dillard's name. A new 202,000 sq ft (18,800 m^{2}) Dillard's location was constructed on the former JCPenney site in 1998.
- Bargain Max. Opened in the former Sears location that was turned into Teddy’s Emporium Outlet before Bargain Max eventually opened. Bargain Max is a discount supermarket that sells a wide variety of items and utilizes the entire anchor space. Opened in September 2024.

=== Former anchors ===
- JCPenney was an original anchor tenant of the mall, although the store relocated from its original location. In 1997, a new 104,000 sq ft (9,660 m^{2}) JCPenney store was built on the northwest side of the mall and the old location was demolished. On March 17, 2017, it was announced that JCPenney would close, leaving the mall with only 2 anchors.
- Sears became the fourth anchor tenant of the mall when it moved into the space vacated by Dillard's in 1998. Sears closed in December 2014.
- Curt's Premium Outlet occupied the anchor space that was previously JC Penney. The store closed in September 2024.
- Teddy's occupied the space of the former Sears. The store closed in September 2022.
