= North Carolina Highway 152 =

State highway in North Carolina, US

North Carolina Highway 152

Route information
- Maintained by NCDOT
- Length: 25.5 mi (41.0 km)
- Existed: 1930–present

Major junctions
- West end: NC 150 in Mooresville
- US 29 in China Grove; I-85 / US 601 in China Grove
- East end: US 52 in Rockwell

Location
- Country: United States
- State: North Carolina
- Counties: Iredell, Rowan

Highway system
- North Carolina Highway System; Interstate; US; State; Scenic
| ← NC 151 | → NC 153 |

North Carolina Highway 152 (NC 152) is a 25.5-mile-long (41.0 km) primary state highway in the U.S. state of North Carolina. It serves as the main thoroughfare in southern Rowan County.

== Route description ==
NC 152 is a predominantly two-lane highway that traverses 25.5 miles (41.0 km) from NC 150 in Mooresville to U.S. Route 52 (US 52) in Rockwell.

== History ==
NC 150 was established in 1930 as a new primary routing from NC 150 east of Mooresville to NC 80 in Rockwell. By 1955, NC 152 was extended through downtown Mooresville replacing parts of NC 150 and NC 150A. In August 2003, NC 152 was realigned in downtown Mooresville to follow NC 3 to its northern terminus with NC 150, thus becoming NC 152's current western terminus. In December 2003, NC 152 was rerouted in China Grove, upgrading East Church Street (SR 1337) to US 29, then taking the immediate interchange to its north back onto its alignment. The old routing along North Main Street was downgraded to secondary roads.

== Junction list ==
| County | Location | mi | km | Destinations | Notes |
|---|---|---|---|---|---|
| Iredell | Mooresville | 0.0 | 0.0 | NC 150 (Plaza Drive) / NC 3 begins – Lincolnton | North end of NC 3 overlap |
| Iredell | Mooresville | 0.8 | 1.3 | NC 115 (Broad Street) – Charlotte, Troutman | |
| Iredell | Mooresville | 0.9 | 1.4 | NC 3 south (Iredell Avenue) – Kannapolis | South end of NC 3 overlap |
| Iredell | Mooresville | 1.5 | 2.4 | NC 801 north (Park Avenue) – Barber | Southern terminus of NC 801 |
| Iredell | Mooresville | 3.5 | 5.6 | NC 150 west (Oakridge Farm Highway) – Lincolnton | West end of NC 150 overlap |
| Iredell | Mooresville | 3.7 | 6.0 | NC 150 east (Oakridge Farm Highway) – Salisbury | East end of NC 150 overlap |
| Rowan | | 10.8 | 17.4 | NC 153 east – Landis | Western terminus of NC 153 |
| Rowan | China Grove | 15.7 | 25.3 | US 29 south – Kannapolis | South end of US 29 overlap |
| Rowan | China Grove | 16.3 | 26.2 | US 29 north to I-85 / US 601 north – Salisbury, Greensboro | Interchange; north end of US 29 overlap |
| Rowan | China Grove | 16.7 | 26.9 | I-85 south / US 601 south – Concord, Charlotte | Exit 58 (I-85); northbound I-85 exit / southbound I-85 entrance only |
| Rowan | Rockwell | 25.5 | 41.0 | US 52 (Main Street) – Albemarle, Salisbury | |
1.000 mi = 1.609 km; 1.000 km = 0.621 mi: Concurrency terminus; Incomplete access

== Special routes ==
=== Mooresville truck route ===
North Carolina Highway 152 Truck
- Location: Mooresville, North Carolina
- Length: 3.2 mi (5.1 km)

North Carolina Highway 152 Truck (NC 152 Truck) overlaps entirely with NC 150 (Oakridge Farm Road) in Mooresville.
