= North Carolina Highway 7 =

State highway in Gaston County, North Carolina, US

North Carolina Highway 7

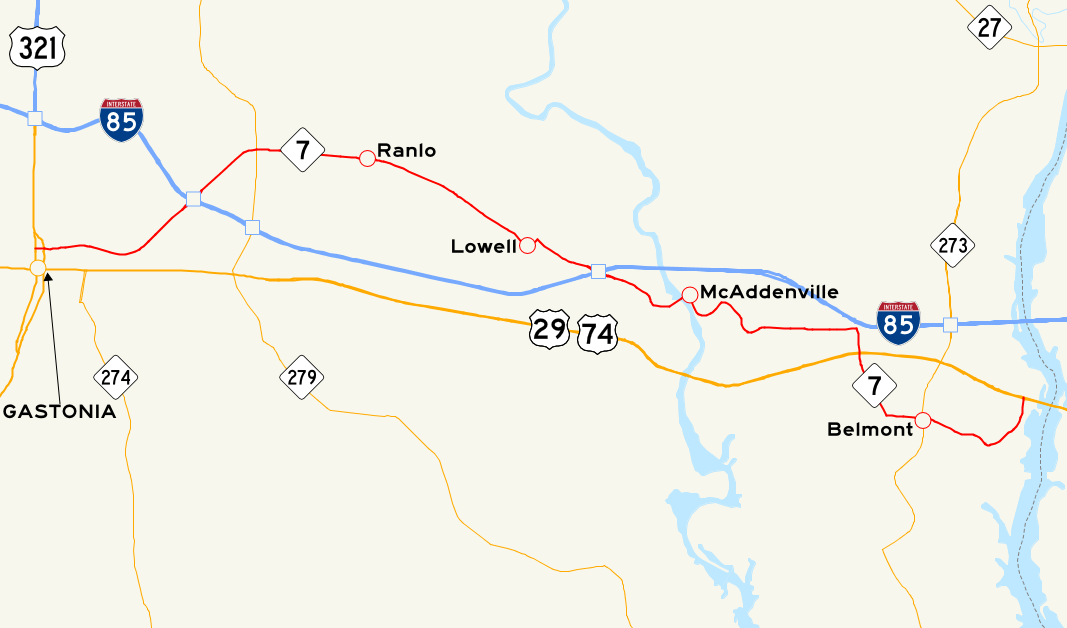

Route information
- Maintained by NCDOT
- Length: 12.078 mi (19.438 km)
- Existed: 1932–present

Major junctions
- West end: US 321 in Gastonia
- I-85 in Gastonia; I-85 in Lowell/McAdenville; I-85 in western Belmont; US 29 / US 74 in western Belmont
- East end: US 29 / US 74 in Belmont

Location
- Country: United States
- State: North Carolina
- Counties: Gaston

Highway system
- North Carolina Highway System; Interstate; US; State; Scenic
← NC 5	→ NC 8

North Carolina Highway 7 (NC 7) is a primary state highway in the U.S. state of North Carolina. Entirely within Gaston County, it connects the towns of Lowell, McAdenville, and Belmont with the city of Gastonia.

== Route description ==
=== Gastonia, Ranlo, and Lowell ===
NC 7's western terminus is at U.S. Route 321 (US 321), just north of downtown Gastonia. US 321 at this point is divided onto two roads: North Chester Street and North York Street. NC 7 is also known as Ozark Avenue in the city of Gastonia. Traveling in a northeasterly direction, NC 7 crosses Interstate 85 (I-85) for the first time and shortly after, intersects with NC 279. After crossing Spencer Mountain Road into the town of Ranlo, NC 7 becomes the aptly named Lowell Road since the next town NC 7 enters is Lowell. Once inside the Lowell town limits, NC 7 is also known as West First Street. In downtown Lowell, NC 7 turns left onto Main Street and quickly turns right onto Third Street, where NC 7 makes its second crossing of Interstate 85 (exit 23).

=== McAdenville and ChristmasTown USA ===
Immediately after crossing I-85, NC 7 enters one of North Carolina's most famous cities: McAdenville. Every Christmas season, McAdenville residents deck nearly every square foot of the town with decorations; the event is known as ChristmasTown USA. During this time, NC 7 can become a traffic nightmare as tourists flock to McAdenville. Through this segment, NC 7 is known as Main Street. Immediately after crossing the South Fork Catawba River and leaving downtown McAdenville, NC 7 makes another turn, onto Riverside Drive, which is renamed McAdenville Road a half-mile down the road.

=== Cramerton and Belmont ===
After skirting the outskirts of Cramerton, NC 7 once again changes road. This time NC 7 moves right onto Old NC 273 in Belmont; exit ramps to another interchange with Interstate 85 (exit 26) are found near this intersection. NC 7 crosses US 29/US 74 and then loops around downtown Belmont, before going back to US 29/74, where it ends. Through town, NC 7 is known as Main Street, and then as Catawba Street. NC 7 and NC 273 intersect in the center of downtown Belmont. Three quarters of a mile after this intersection, NC 7 comes to its eastern terminus.

== History ==
Established in 1932 as a renumbering of NC 29; which itself was created two years prior when US 74/NC 20 was realigned between Lowell, McAdenville, and Belmont. In 1935, NC 7 was extended west, on new road, to Kings Mountain; however, in 1938, it was reverted to its original western terminus when US 29/US 74 was realigned onto the new road, dropping the route through Bessemer City. The route has changed little since its inception.

=== North Carolina Highway 29 ===
North Carolina Highway 29
- Location: Gastonia–Belmont
- Length: 12.078 mi (19.438 km)
- Existed: 1930–1932

North Carolina Highway 29 (NC 29) was established 1930 when US 74/NC 20 was realigned onto new road; this was its second form. In 1932, it was renumbered as NC 7.

The first NC 29 was an original state highway from the South Carolina state line, near Tuxedo, to English, located in Walnut Mountains. In 1928, NC 29 was replaced by NC 69, between the South Carolina state line to Mars Hill; with NC 31 in Mars Hill and NC 311 north to the Tennessee state line.

== Major intersections ==
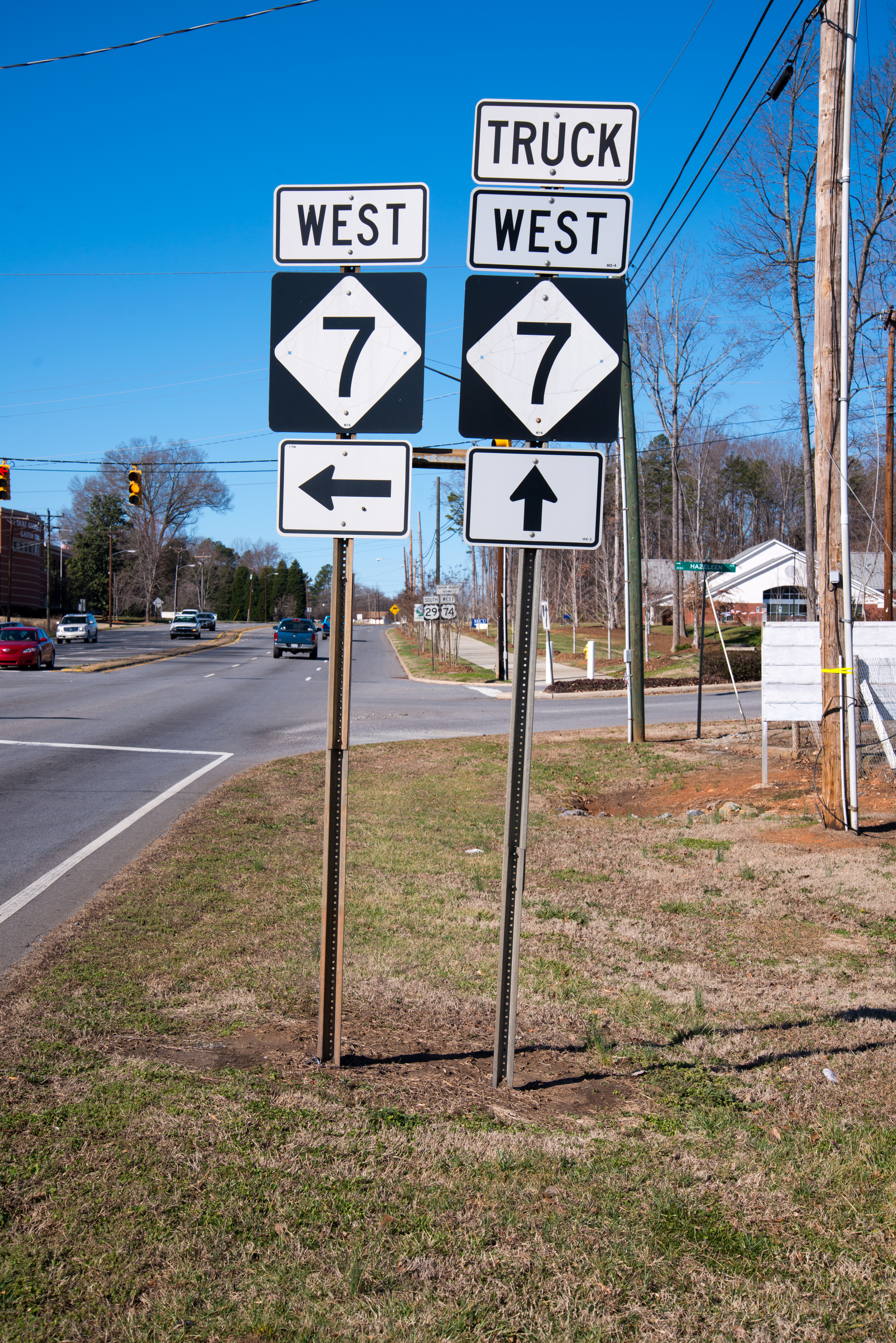
West NC 7/West NC 7 Truck at Wilkinson Boulevard and Catawba Avenue

The entire route is in Gaston County.

Location	mi	km	Destinations	Notes
Gastonia	0.0	0.0	US 321 south (North Chester Street)	
Gastonia	0.1	0.16	US 321 north (North York Street)	
Gastonia	1.8	2.9	I-85 – Charlotte, Kings Mountain	Exit 19 (I-85)
Gastonia	2.6	4.2	NC 279 north (North New Hope Road) – Hamlet	
Lowell	6.5	10.5	I-85 – Charlotte, Gastonia	Exit 23 (I-85)
Belmont	9.2	14.8	I-85 north – Charlotte	Exit 26 (I-85), southbound I-85 access via Belmont-Mount Holly Road
Belmont	9.7	15.6	US 29 / US 74 (Wilkinson Boulevard) – Cramerton, Charlotte, Gastonia	
Belmont	10.7	17.2	NC 273 (Park Street) – Mount Holly	
Belmont	12.1	19.5	US 29 / US 74 (Wilkinson Boulevard) – Charlotte, Gastonia	
1.000 mi = 1.609 km; 1.000 km = 0.621 mi: Incomplete access

== Special routes ==
=== Belmont truck route ===
North Carolina Highway 7 Truck
- Location: Belmont, North Carolina
- Length: 1.7 mi (2.7 km)

NC 7 Truck is a short 1.7-mile (2.7 km) route that overlaps entirely with US 29 and US 74 through Belmont. The truck route was established to keep trucks from traveling through downtown Belmont. The eastern terminus is also the end point of NC 7.

The entire route is in Belmont, Gaston County.

mi	km	Destinations	Notes
0.0	0.0	US 29 south / US 74 west (Wilkinson Boulevard) / NC 7 (Main Street) – Gastonia	South end of US 29 and west end of US 74 overlap
0.8	1.3	NC 273 (Park Street) – Mount Holly	
1.7	2.7	US 29 north / US 74 east (Wilkinson Boulevard) / NC 7 west (Catawba Street) – Charlotte	North end of US 29 and east end of US 74 overlap
1.000 mi = 1.609 km; 1.000 km = 0.621 mi: Concurrency terminus
