= U.S. Route 29 in North Carolina =

Highway in North Carolina

U.S. Highway 29
- US 29 highlighted in red

Route information
- Maintained by NCDOT
- Length: 168.7 mi (271.5 km)
- Existed: 1927–present

Major junctions
- South end: US 29 at the South Carolina state line near Blacksburg
- I-85 (several times); I-485 in Charlotte (twice); I-77 / US 21 in Charlotte; I-74 in High Point; I-73 / I-85 / US 421 in Greensboro; I-40 / US 220 in Greensboro; I-785 / I-840 in Greensboro; US 158 in Reidsville
- North end: US 29 at the Virginia state line near Danville

Location
- Country: United States
- State: North Carolina
- Counties: Cleveland, Gaston, Mecklenburg, Cabarrus, Rowan, Davidson, Randolph, Guilford, Rockingham, Caswell

Highway system
- United States Numbered Highway System; List; Special; Divided; North Carolina Highway System; Interstate; US; State; Scenic
← NC 28	→ NC 30

U.S. Highway 29 (US 29) is a United States Numbered Highway that runs for 168.7 miles (271.5 km) from the South Carolina state line, near Blacksburg, to the commonwealth of Virginia, near Danville. It is signed with north–south cardinal directions but is actually a northeast and southwest diagonal highway throughout the state. The route serves the North Carolina Piedmont, including the cities of Charlotte, Salisbury, High Point, and Greensboro. From Salisbury to Greensboro, US 29 spends roughly a third of its length in the state being concurrent with US 70.

== Route description ==
US 29/NC 49 northbound (North Tryon Street) near University City Boulevard in northeast Charlotte

US 29 starts in Grover as a two-lane rural road where it intersects with North Carolina Highway 226 (NC 226) shortly after. It then turns into a four-lane boulevard as it heads to Kings Mountain, briefly overlapping with NC 216 as it merges into Interstate 85 (I-85), sharing a concurrency with the Interstate. It then exits I-85 at exit 10A running together with US 74. US 29/US 74 then overlaps with NC 274 for two miles (3.2 km) as the three routes head toward Gastonia. In downtown Gastonia, US 29/US 74/NC 274 intersects with US 321 with NC 274 splitting off on South Broad Street. US 29/US 74 then meets NC 279 before going into Lowell, McAdenville, and Belmont where US 29/US 74 meets NC 7 and then I-485 before going to Charlotte. US 29/US 74 offers access to Charlotte Douglas International Airport before intersecting with Billy Graham Parkway. Here, US 29/US 74 is named Wilkinson Boulevard. At Morehead Street, US 29 splits from US 74 where US 29 briefly overlaps with NC 27 and then intersects I-77. Afterward, US 29 splits from NC 27 where it meets NC 49 as the two routes go around Bank of America Stadium and go along Graham Street through Uptown Charlotte.

Afterward, US 29/NC 49 turns into a boulevard going east on Dalton Avenue and then north on Tryon Street. Eventually, US 29/NC 49 intersects Old Concord Road where the Lynx Blue Line runs between the northbound and southbound lanes. At University City Boulevard, NC 49 splits from US 29 with NC 49 going around the southern part of the University of North Carolina at Charlotte (UNC Charlotte) campus, and US 29 going around the west. Here, the Lynx Blue Line goes under the northbound lanes of US 29 to offer access to UNC Charlotte while US 29 continues as a boulevard toward Concord. Before doing so, it intersects with I-485 once again. Before heading toward Concord, US 29 offers access to Charlotte Motor Speedway before meeting at an interchange with George Liles Parkway. It then briefly overlaps with US 601 and NC 73 in western Concord before US 601 splits to run concurrently with I-85 and NC 73 splitting to head toward downtown Concord. From here, US 29 runs north through Kannapolis. US 29 then goes through Landis and China Grove, briefly overlapping with NC 152 east of China Grove.

US 29 then heads toward Salisbury where, west of downtown Salisbury, it begins to run concurrently with US 70 serving as Salisbury's Main Street. After going through downtown Salisbury, US 29/US 70 offers access to both Spencer and East Spencer before crossing over the Yadkin River. Afterward, US 29/US 70 then merges into I-85/US 52 as the four highways all run together for roughly two miles (3.2 km). At exit 87, US 29/US 52/US 70 splits from I-85 and briefly joins I-285, where US 29 follows the route of former I-85 Business (I-85 Bus.). West of Lexington, US 52 and I-285 split away from US 29/US 70. US 29/US 70 then goes around the northern edge of Lexington where the two routes briefly overlap with US 64 before heading toward Thomasville. In Thomasville, US 70 splits from US 29 and joins NC 68 towards High Point.

Exiting Thomasville, US 29 then goes south of High Point and north of Trinity and Archdale before intersecting I-74 southeast of High Point. Following this, US 29 once again runs together with I-85 proper before splitting at the interchange with I-73/US 421. US 29 then merges into I-40 running together with US 220 south of Greensboro. The now three simultaneously running highways (US 29, US 220, and I-40) go around southern Greensboro before US 29/US 220 splits from I-40 going north around eastern Greensboro as a controlled-access highway named O. Henry Boulevard. As US 29/US 220 intersects Wendover Avenue, US 220 splits from US 29 going west.

US 29, now all alone, goes through the northeastern suburbs of Greensboro where it intersects with I-785 and will run concurrently with I-785 past the Virginia state line once modifications to the existing US 29 are completed. After meeting I-785, US 29 is largely rural with Reidsville being the last town served along the route. Here in Reidsville, US 29 intersects with US 29 Bus. with the latter acting as a beltline stretching around western Reidsville. Afterward, US 29 heads northeast to Virginia just southwest of Danville.

== History ==
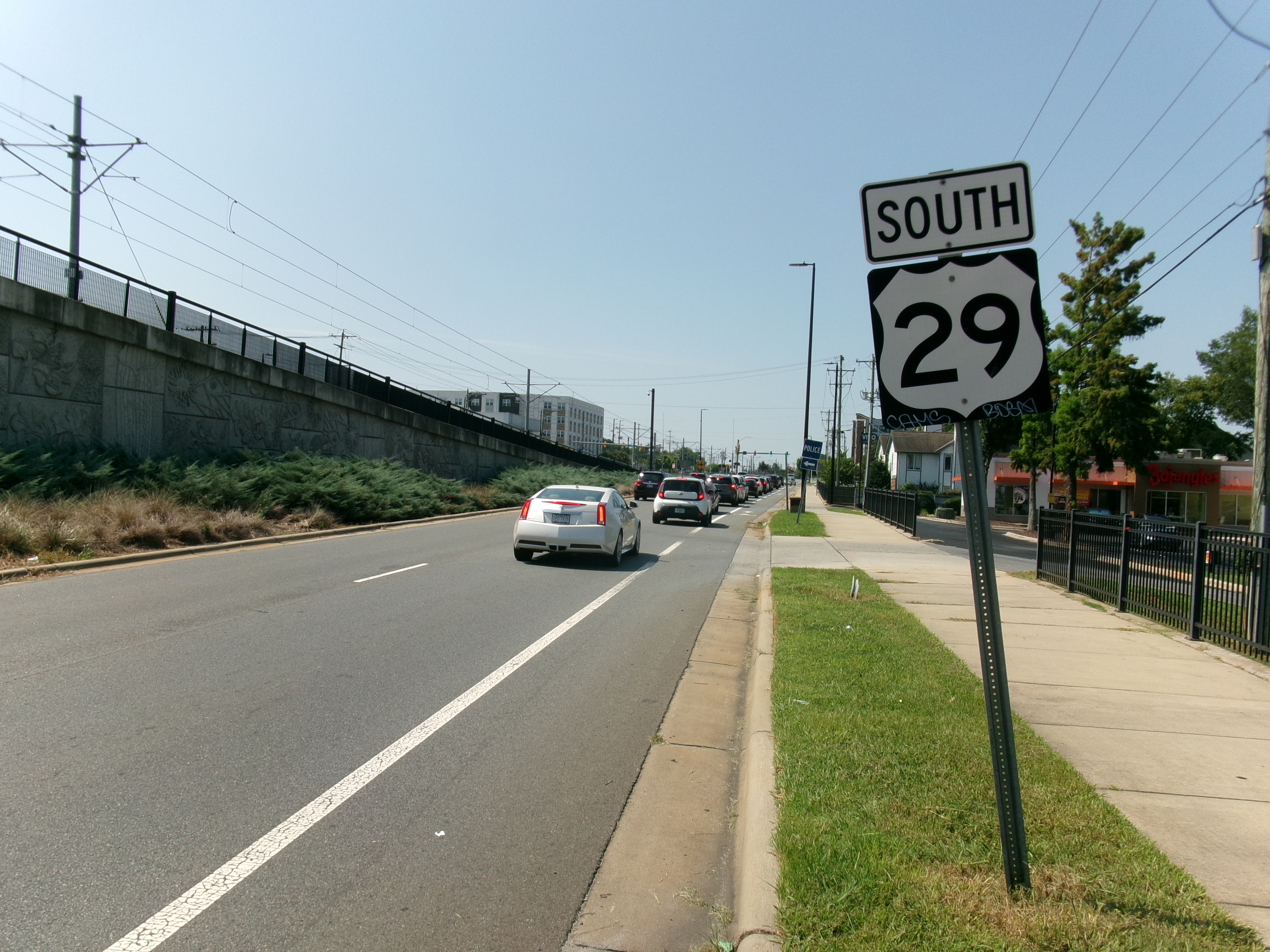
View south along US 29 past the NC 24 junction in northeast Charlotte

Established in 1927, it ran from the South Carolina state line to US 74 in Kings Mountain, with a concurrency with NC 205. In 1929, NC 205 was removed.

US 29's first extension was in 1932, following US 74/NC 20 east into Charlotte. It then replaced US 170 from Charlotte to the Virginia state line. In 1937, it replaced a stretch of NC 7 going between Kings Mountain and Gastonia. The old route briefly became alternates for both U.S. Highways before becoming NC 161 and NC 274.

In 1938, US 29 was moved onto a new bypass around Kannapolis–China Grove, leaving US 29A on the old route. In 1948, the routes were switched. In 1952, US 29 was moved onto new bypasses around Lexington and Thomasville, leaving behind US 29A in both cities. In 1957, US 29 was moved onto its modern route from Thomasville to Jamestown, old route became part of NC 68 and US 70A.

Between 1944 and 1949, US 29 was moved onto a new route north of Greensboro as well as part of the eastern bypass. By 1953, a southern bypass of Greensboro was completed. The eastern bypass was completed to Summit Avenue at Phillips Avenue by December 1956. The widening of eleven and a half miles of US 29 north of Greensboro was announced in 1959.

In 1957 or 1958, US 29 was moved onto new bypass west of Reidsville, leaving US 29A (later US 29 Bus.) through Reidsville. Also around same time, US 29 was moved onto new bypass east of Kings Mountain, extending NC 216 over its old route; then in Charlotte, it moved onto I-85 between Little Rock Road (exit 32) and the University City area (exit 42), old route through Charlotte as US 29 Bus. In 1961 or 1962, US 29 was moved back further to NC 273 going onto I-85, but, surprisingly, in 1963, US 29 was placed back on its original route through Charlotte again. Similar action also in Salisbury, where, in 1960, US 29 was moved onto I-85, then, in 1964 or 1965, it was moved back through town.

In 1973, US 29 was placed on a new freeway bypass east of Reidsville; its old bypass route was reverted to US 29 Bus., while the old US 29 Bus. through Reidsville was removed. Between 1980 and 1982, the freeway from Reidsville was extended into Virginia.

=== U.S. Route 170 ===
U.S. Highway 170
- Location: Charlotte, North Carolina–Virginia state line
- Length: 141.1 mi (227.1 km)
- Existed: 1926–1932

U.S. Highway 170 (US 170) was an original U.S. Highway, established in 1926. It began at the intersection of Trade and Tryon streets in Charlotte, traversing northeast, in concurrency with NC 15 to Concord, Kannapolis, and Salisbury. Northeast of Salisbury, it was overlapped with NC 10 to Lexington, High Point, and Greensboro; via High Point Road to Lee Street, to Fairground Avenue, to Spring Garden Street, to Aycock Street, to West Market Street, to Greene Street, and finally to Summit Avenue, where it began its overlap with NC 70 heading northeast to Browns Summit. Heading northeast, it went through Reidsville, Ruffin, and finally Pelham before crossing into Virginia toward Danville and eventually Lynchburg. In 1932, US 29 joined in concurrency with US 170. Later on, the US 170 designation was removed, leaving US 29 on the route.

== Junction list ==
County	Location	mi	km	Exit	Destinations	Notes
Cleveland	Grover	0.00	0.00		US 29 south – Gaffney	Continuation from South Carolina
Cleveland	Grover	0.1	0.16		NC 226 north – Shelby, Grover	
Cleveland		2.2	3.5		NC 216 south to I-85	South end of NC 216 overlap
Cleveland		3.5	5.6		NC 216 north – Kings Mountain	North end of NC 216 overlap
Cleveland		3.9	6.3		I-85 south – Spartanburg, Greenville	South end of I-85 overlap; southbound left exit and northbound entrance; I-85 exit 4
Cleveland		5.2	8.4	5	Dixon School Road	Exit numbers follow I-85
Cleveland	Kings Mountain	8.0	12.9	8	NC 161 – Kings Mountain	Exit numbers follow I-85
Gaston	Kings Mountain	9.5– 10.7	15.3– 17.2		I-85 north – Charlotte US 74 west – Kings Mountain, Shelby	North end of I-85 overlap; south end of US 74 overlap; I-85 exit 10A
Gaston	Gastonia	15.4	24.8		NC 274 north (Bessemer City Road) – Bessemer City	West end of NC 274 overlap
Gaston	Gastonia	17.0	27.4		US 321 south (Chester Street)	One-way couplet
Gaston	Gastonia	17.1	27.5		US 321 north (York Street)	One-way couplet
Gaston	Gastonia	17.5	28.2		NC 274 south (Broad Street) – Gastonia Municipal Airport	East end of NC 274 overlap
Gaston	Gastonia	19.0	30.6		NC 279 (New Hope Road)	
Gaston	Gastonia	19.2	30.9		To Cox Road – Shopping Mall	Interchange; northbound exit and southbound entrance
Gaston	Belmont	25.4	40.9		NC 7 (Main Street)	To Belmont Abbey College
Gaston	Belmont	26.2	42.2		NC 273 (Park Street) – Mount Holly	
Gaston	Belmont	27.1	43.6		NC 7 west (Catawba Street)	
Catawba River		27.4	44.1		Sloans Ferry Bridge	
Mecklenburg		29.7	47.8		I-485 – Columbia, Spartanburg	I-485 exit 9
Mecklenburg	Charlotte	31.3	50.4		Little Rock Road – CLT Airport	
Mecklenburg	Charlotte	32.4	52.1		Boyer Street to Billy Graham Parkway (Charlotte Route 4) – CLT Airport	
Mecklenburg	Charlotte	35.0	56.3		US 74 east (Wilkinson Boulevard)	North end of US 74 overlap
Mecklenburg	Charlotte	35.8	57.6		NC 27 west (Freedom Drive)	South end of NC 27 overlap
Mecklenburg	Charlotte	36.2	58.3		I-77 north / US 21 north – Statesville	I-77 exit 10A
Mecklenburg	Charlotte	36.7	59.1		NC 49 south / NC 27 east (Morehead Street east)	North end of NC 27 overlap; south end of NC 49 overlap
Mecklenburg	Charlotte	38.0	61.2		I-277 north / NC 16 north (Outer) to I-77 / US 21	I-277 exit 4
Mecklenburg	Charlotte	41.1	66.1		Sugar Creek Road (Charlotte Route 4) to I-85	
Mecklenburg	Charlotte	44.0	70.8		I-85 south	I-85 exit 42; access via I-85 Connector
Mecklenburg	Charlotte	44.6	71.8		NC 49 north (University City Boulevard) – Harrisburg	North end of NC 49 overlap
Mecklenburg	Charlotte	45.7	73.5		NC 24 (W.T. Harris Boulevard)	
Mecklenburg	Charlotte	48.3	77.7		I-485 to I-85	Interchange; I-485 exit 32
Cabarrus	Concord	50.6	81.4		Bruton Smith Boulevard to I-85	
Cabarrus	Concord	56.4	90.8		George Liles Parkway to I-85	Interchange
Cabarrus	Concord	56.4	90.8		US 601 south (Warren C. Coleman Boulevard) – Monroe	South end of US 601 overlap
Cabarrus	Concord	58.7	94.5		NC 73 west (Davidson Highway) – Davidson	South end of NC 73 overlap
Cabarrus	Concord	59.0	95.0		NC 73 east (Davidson Drive)	North end of NC 73 overlap
Cabarrus	Concord	60.0	96.6		I-85 / US 601 north – Charlotte, Salisbury, Greensboro	North end of US 601 overlap; I-85 exit 58
Cabarrus	Kannapolis	62.1	99.9		NC 3 (Dale Earnhardt Boulevard)	
Cabarrus	Kannapolis	63.2	101.7		Lakeview Street	Right-in/right-out; northbound exit and entrance only
Cabarrus	Kannapolis	63.3	101.9		Martin Luther King Jr. Avenue – Kannapolis, Downtown	Interchange
Rowan	China Grove	69.4	111.7		NC 152 west (Church Street) – Downtown	South end of NC 152 overlap
Rowan	China Grove	70.0	112.7		NC 152 east to I-85 / US 601 – Rockwell	Interchange; north end of NC 152 overlap
Rowan	Salisbury	76.8	123.6		US 70 west / US 601 (Jake Alexander Boulevard) – Statesville, Mocksville	Interchange; south end of US 70 overlap
Rowan	Salisbury	77.4	124.6		NC 150 west (Mooresville Road)	South end of NC 150 overlap
Yadkin River		84.8	136.5		Bridge	
Davidson		85.2	137.1		I-85 / US 52 south – Charlotte	Permanently closed as of April, 2010; was I-85 exit 82
Davidson		86.0	138.4		NC 150 east	North end of NC 150 overlap; I-85 exit 84
Davidson		86.0	138.4		I-85 south / US 52 south	South end of I-85/US 52 overlap; I-85 exit 84; south end of freeway section
Davidson		87.0	140.0	85	Clark Road	Permanently closed as of November, 2012; exit numbers follow I-85
Davidson		88.4	142.3	86	Belmont Road	
Davidson	Lexington	90.1	145.0	—	I-85 north – Greensboro, High Point I-285 begins	North end of I-85 overlap; south end of I-285 overlap; northbound left exit and southbound left entrance; I-85 exit 87; former southern terminus of I-85 BL
Davidson	Lexington	91.1	146.6	84	NC 47 east to I-85 north	Exit numbers follow US 52
Davidson	Lexington	92.0	148.1	85	Green Needles Road	Exit numbers follow US 52
Davidson	Lexington	93.2	150.0	86	Lexington, Downtown	Exit numbers follow US 52
Davidson	Lexington	94.2	151.6	—	I-285 north / US 52 north – Winston-Salem	North end of I-285/US 52 overlap; northbound exit and southbound entrance; US 52 exit 87
Davidson	Lexington	95.2	153.2	—	Old US 64	
Davidson	Lexington	95.7	154.0	—	US 64 west – Mocksville	South end of US 64 overlap
Davidson	Lexington			—	Smokehouse Lane	Right-in/right-out; southbound exit and entrance; exit unsigned
Davidson	Lexington	96.6	155.5	—	NC 8 (Winston Road) – Lexington, Winston-Salem	North end of freeway section
Davidson	Lexington	97.5	156.9		US 64 east – Asheboro	Interchange; north end of US 64 overlap
Davidson	Thomasville	104.8	168.7		Thomasville	Interchange northbound; former US 29 north; southbound access via Kanoy Road
Davidson	Thomasville	107.2	172.5		NC 109 (Salem Street) – Thomasville, Winston-Salem	Interchange
Davidson	Thomasville	108.9	175.3		US 70 east / NC 68 (National Highway) – Thomasville, West High Point	Interchange; north end of US 70 overlap; to PTI Airport
Randolph	High Point	110.0	177.0	—	Old Thomasville Road – High Point	South end of expressway section
Guilford	High Point	110.7	178.2	—	Prospect Street	
Guilford	High Point	111.8	179.9	—	West Green Drive	
Guilford	High Point	112.6	181.2	—	Surrett Drive	
Guilford	High Point	113.2	182.2	—	Main Street – High Point	
Guilford	High Point	114.5	184.3	—	I-74 / Brentwood Street – Winston-Salem, Asheboro	North end of expressway section; Brentwood Street has a separate exit northbound; three-level diamond interchange; I-74 exit 71B
Guilford	High Point	115.6	186.0		Baker Road	Interchange
Guilford	High Point	116.7	187.8		Kivett Drive – East High Point	Interchange
Guilford	Greensboro	119.3	192.0	—	Vickery Chapel Road / Guilford College Road – Jamestown	South end of freeway section
Guilford	Greensboro	120.8	194.4	—	I-85 south – Charlotte, Salisbury	South end of I-85 overlap; I-85 exit 118
Guilford	Greensboro	121.8	196.0	33A	Groometown Road to Grandover Parkway	Exit numbers based on former I-85 BL mileage; signed as exit 119 northbound; southbound exit ramp shared with exit 33B
Guilford	Greensboro	122.6	197.3	—	I-85 north to US 421 south – Durham, Sanford	North end of I-85 overlap; southbound left exit and northbound left entrance; I-85 exit 120A
Guilford	Greensboro	122.6	197.3	33B	I-73 / US 421 north to I-40 west – Winston-Salem	No northbound exit; I-73 exit 97; I-85 exit 120B
Guilford	Greensboro	123.5	198.8	34	Holden Road	
Guilford	Greensboro	124.4	200.2	35A	US 220 south to I-73 south – Asheboro	US 220 north exits 79A-B
Guilford	Greensboro	124.6	200.5	35B	US 220 north to I-40 west – Coliseum Area	Northbound exit and southbound entrance; US 220 south exit 79
Guilford	Greensboro	124.9	201.0	35C	Rehobeth Church Road / Vandalia Road	
Guilford	Greensboro			220	Randleman Road	Northbound exit and southbound left entrance; exit numbers follow I-40
Guilford	Greensboro	125.9	202.6	—	I-40 west / US 220 south – Winston-Salem	No northbound exit; south end of I-40/US 220 overlap; I-40 exit 219
Guilford	Greensboro	126.1	202.9	220	Randleman Road	Southbound exit and northbound entrance
Guilford	Greensboro	126.7	203.9	221	South Elm-Eugene Street – Downtown Greensboro	
Guilford	Greensboro	127.9	205.8	222	Martin Luther King Jr. Drive	Northbound exit and southbound entrance; former US 421 south
Guilford	Greensboro	128.2	206.3	—	I-40 east	North end of I-40 overlap; former I-85 BL north; northbound left exit and southbound entrance; I-40 exit 223
Guilford	Greensboro			—	Martin Luther King Jr. Drive east to I-40	Southbound left exit and northbound entrance; former US 421 south
Guilford	Greensboro	128.6	207.0	—	Florida Street	Northbound exit and entrance only
Guilford	Greensboro	129.4	208.2	—	Gate City Boulevard	Cloverleaf interchange
Guilford	Greensboro	130.2	209.5	—	Market Street	To North Carolina A&T State University
Guilford	Greensboro	130.6	210.2	—	Sullivan Street	Northbound exit and entrance only
Guilford	Greensboro	130.8	210.5	—	Bessemer Avenue	
Guilford	Greensboro	131.1	211.0	—	US 220 / US 70 (Wendover Avenue)	Cloverleaf interchange; north end of US 220 overlap; north end of freeway section
Guilford	Greensboro	131.9	212.3	—	Summit Avenue – Downtown	South end of expressway; southbound exit and northbound entrance
Guilford	Greensboro	132.4	213.1	—	16th Street	
Guilford	Greensboro	132.9	213.9	—	Cone Boulevard	North end of expressway
Guilford	Greensboro	135.3	217.7	135	I-785 south / I-840 – Raleigh, Charlotte, Winston-Salem	Interchange; signed as exits 135A (east) and 135B (west); northern terminus of I-785; I-840 exits 14A-B
Guilford	Greensboro	136.0	218.9	136	Hicone Road	Interchange
Guilford	Greensboro	137.9	221.9	137	Reedy Fork Parkway	Interchange
Guilford		140.9	226.8		NC 150 – Brown Summit	Interchange
Guilford		141.9	228.4		Benaja Road	Interchange
Rockingham		144.7	232.9	145	US 29 Bus. north	South end of freeway; access to/from Candy Creek Road
Rockingham	Reidsville	148.5	239.0	149	NC 87 to US 158 west (Freeway Drive) – Reidsville, Burlington	
Rockingham	Reidsville	149.6	240.8	150	Barnes Street – Reidsville Downtown	
Rockingham		152.1	244.8	153	US 158 / NC 14 (Freeway Drive) – Reidsville, Eden, Yanceyville	
Rockingham		155.5	250.3	156	Narrow Gauge Road	
Rockingham		158.3	254.8	159	US 29 Bus. to NC 87 north – Ruffin	
Rockingham	Ruffin	160.6	258.5	161	US 29 Bus. south (Mayfield Road)	
Caswell		164.2	264.3	165	Law Road	
Caswell	Pelham	166.7	268.3	167	NC 700 (Shady Grove Road) – Eden	
North Carolina–Virginia line		168.3– 168.7	270.9– 271.5	169	US 29 Bus. north / US 58 west – Danville, Martinsville	
North Carolina–Virginia line		168.3– 168.7	270.9– 271.5		US 29 north / US 58 east – Lynchburg, South Boston	Continuation into Virginia
1.000 mi = 1.609 km; 1.000 km = 0.621 mi: Closed/former; Concurrency terminus; Incomplete access

== See also ==
- Special routes of U.S. Route 29

U.S. Route 29
Previous state: South Carolina	North Carolina	Next state: Virginia
