= North Carolina Highway 274 =

State highway in North Carolina, US

North Carolina Highway 274

Route information
- Maintained by NCDOT
- Length: 36.7 mi (59.1 km)
- Existed: 1930–present

Major junctions
- South end: SC 274 at the South Carolina state line near Lake Wylie, SC
- US 29 / US 74 in Gastonia; US 321 in Gastonia; I-85 in Gastonia
- North end: NC 27 in Hulls Crossroads

Location
- Country: United States
- State: North Carolina
- Counties: Gaston, Lincoln

Highway system
- North Carolina Highway System; Interstate; US; State; Scenic
← NC 273	→ NC 275

North Carolina Highway 274 (NC 274) is a primary state highway in the U.S. state of North Carolina. It connects rural areas of Lincoln and Gaston counties to Gastonia.

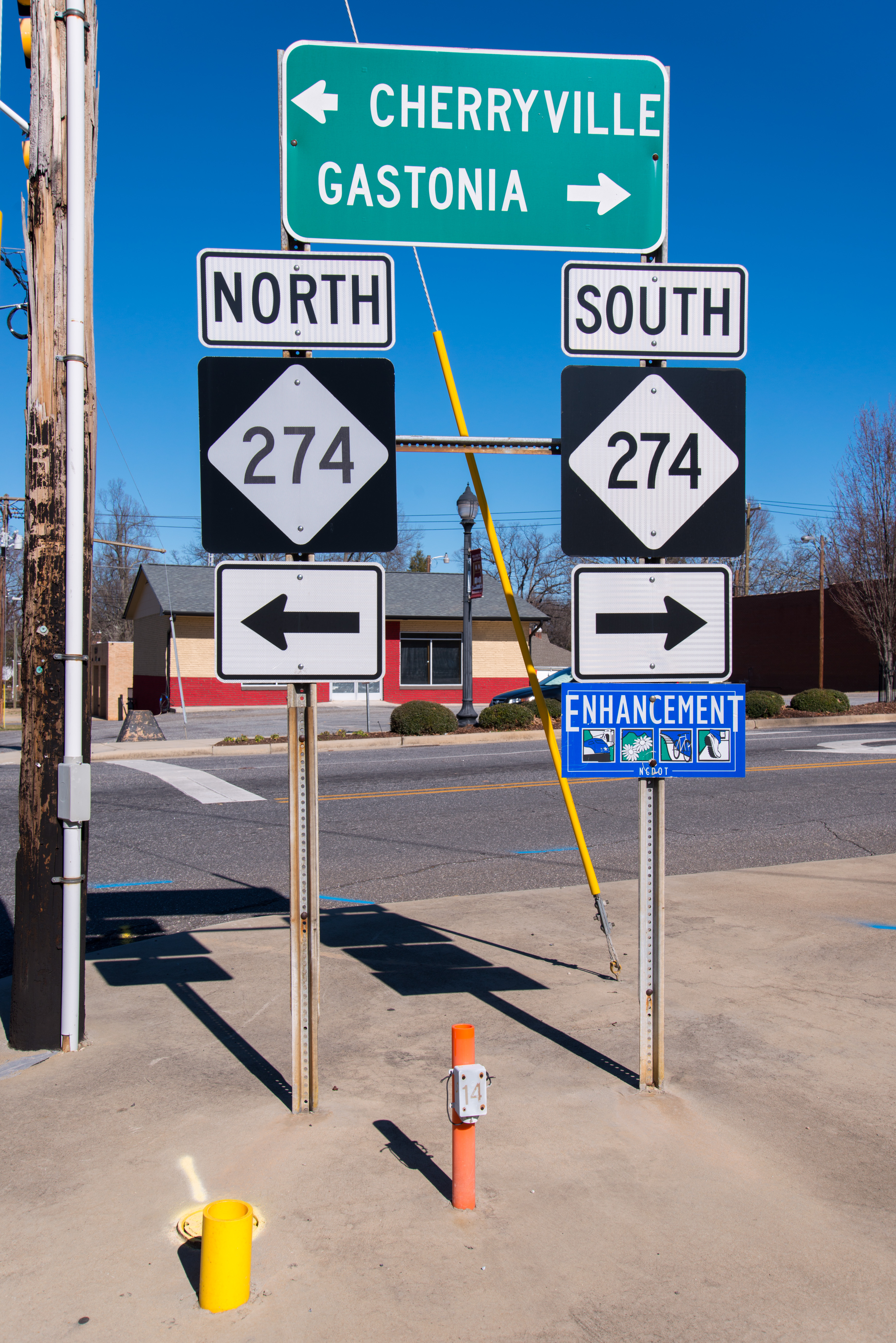
Directional signs of NC 274 at the end of NC 161 in Bessemer City

== History ==
NC 274 was established in 1930 as a new primary routing, from NC 27 to U.S. Route 74 (US 74) and NC 20 (now NC 161) in Bessemer City. Around 1938, it was extended southeast to its current southern terminus at the South Carolina state line, where it continues as South Carolina Highway 274 (SC 274). Between 1963 and 1968, southbound lanes along Broad Street were added on west side of tracks in downtown Gastonia.

== Junction list ==
County	Location	mi	km	Destinations	Notes
Gaston		0.0	0.0	SC 274 east – Lake Wylie	South Carolina state line
Gaston	Gastonia	10.3	16.6	US 29 north / US 74 east (Franklin Boulevard)	North end of US 29 and east end of US 74 overlap
Gaston	Gastonia	10.7	17.2	US 321 (York Street / Chester Street)	North-south US 321 divided on one-way streets
Gaston	Gastonia	12.4	20.0	US 29 south / US 74 west (Franklin Boulevard) – Spartanburg	South end of US 29 and west end of US 74 overlap
Gaston	Gastonia	13.9	22.4	I-85 – Charlotte, Kings Mountain	
Gaston	Gastonia	15.0	24.1	NC 275 east (Dallas-Bessemer City Highway) – Dallas	
Gaston	Bessemer City	17.6	28.3	NC 161 south (13th Street) – Kings Mountain	
Gaston		23.3	37.5	NC 216 south (County Line Road) – Kings Mountain	
Gaston	Cherryville	26.6	42.8	NC 150 (Church Street) to NC 279 – Lincolnton, Shelby	
Lincoln		31.0	49.9	NC 182 – Lincolnton, Fallston	
Lincoln	Hulls Crossroads	36.7	59.1	NC 27 – Lincolnton, Morganton	
1.000 mi = 1.609 km; 1.000 km = 0.621 mi: Concurrency terminus
