= North Carolina Highway 273 =

State highway in Gaston County, North Carolina, US

North Carolina Highway 273

Route information
- Maintained by NCDOT
- Length: 18.8 mi (30.3 km)
- Existed: 1930–present

Major junctions
- South end: NC 279 near Lake Wylie, SC
- US 29 / US 74 in Belmont; I-85 in Belmont
- North end: NC 16 Bus. in Lucia

Location
- Country: United States
- State: North Carolina
- Counties: Gaston

Highway system
- North Carolina Highway System; Interstate; US; State; Scenic
← NC 268	→ NC 274

North Carolina Highway 273 (NC 273) is a primary state highway in the U.S. state of North Carolina. It connects towns and communities along the banks of the Catawba River, in eastern Gaston County.

== Route description ==
View north along NC 273 past the I-85 junction in Belmont

North Carolina Highway 273 "runs 18.74 miles north from NC 279 (S New Hope Road), near Lake Wylie and the South Carolina state line, to NC 16 Business at Lucia"

== History ==
Established in 1930 as a new primary routing, from NC 29 (now NC 7), at Belmont Abbey, to NC 27, in Mount Holly. In 1940, NC 273 was extended north to NC 16, near Lucia. In 1949 or 1950, NC 273 was extended north again, along NC 16, then west on an upgraded road to NC 27, near Goodsonville. In 1967, NC 273 was moved back to its northern terminus at NC 16; the highway between NC 16 and NC 27 became part of NC 73. Between 1980 and 1982, NC 273 was extended south to its current southern terminus at NC 279. In 1988 or 1989, NC 273 was extended north to its current northern terminus in Lucia. In 2000 or 2001, NC 273 was rerouted east around downtown Mount Holly.

== Junction list ==
The entire route is in Gaston County.

Location	mi	km	Destinations	Notes
	0.0	0.0	NC 279 (New Hope Road)	
Belmont	7.4	11.9	NC 7 (Catawba Street)	
Belmont	7.9	12.7	US 29 / US 74	
Belmont	8.2– 8.5	13.2– 13.7	I-85 – Charlotte, Gastonia	Exit 27 (I-85)
Mount Holly	11.5	18.5	NC 27 (Charlotte Avenue)	
Lucia	18.8	30.3	NC 16 Bus. (Lucia Riverbend Highway) to NC 16 – Denver, Newton, Charlotte	
1.000 mi = 1.609 km; 1.000 km = 0.621 mi
