= North Carolina Highway 279 =

State highway in Gaston County, North Carolina, US

North Carolina Highway 279

Route information
- Maintained by NCDOT
- Length: 28.6 mi (46.0 km)
- Existed: 1979–present

Major junctions
- West end: NC 150 in Cherryville
- US 321 in Dallas; I-85 in Gastonia; US 29 / US 74 in Gastonia
- East end: Pole Branch Road at the South Carolina state line near Lake Wylie, SC

Location
- Country: United States
- State: North Carolina
- Counties: Gaston

Highway system
- North Carolina Highway System; Interstate; US; State; Scenic
← I-277	→ NC 280

North Carolina Highway 279 (NC 279) is a primary state highway in the U.S. state of North Carolina. It connects the cities of Cherryville, Dallas, and Gastonia.

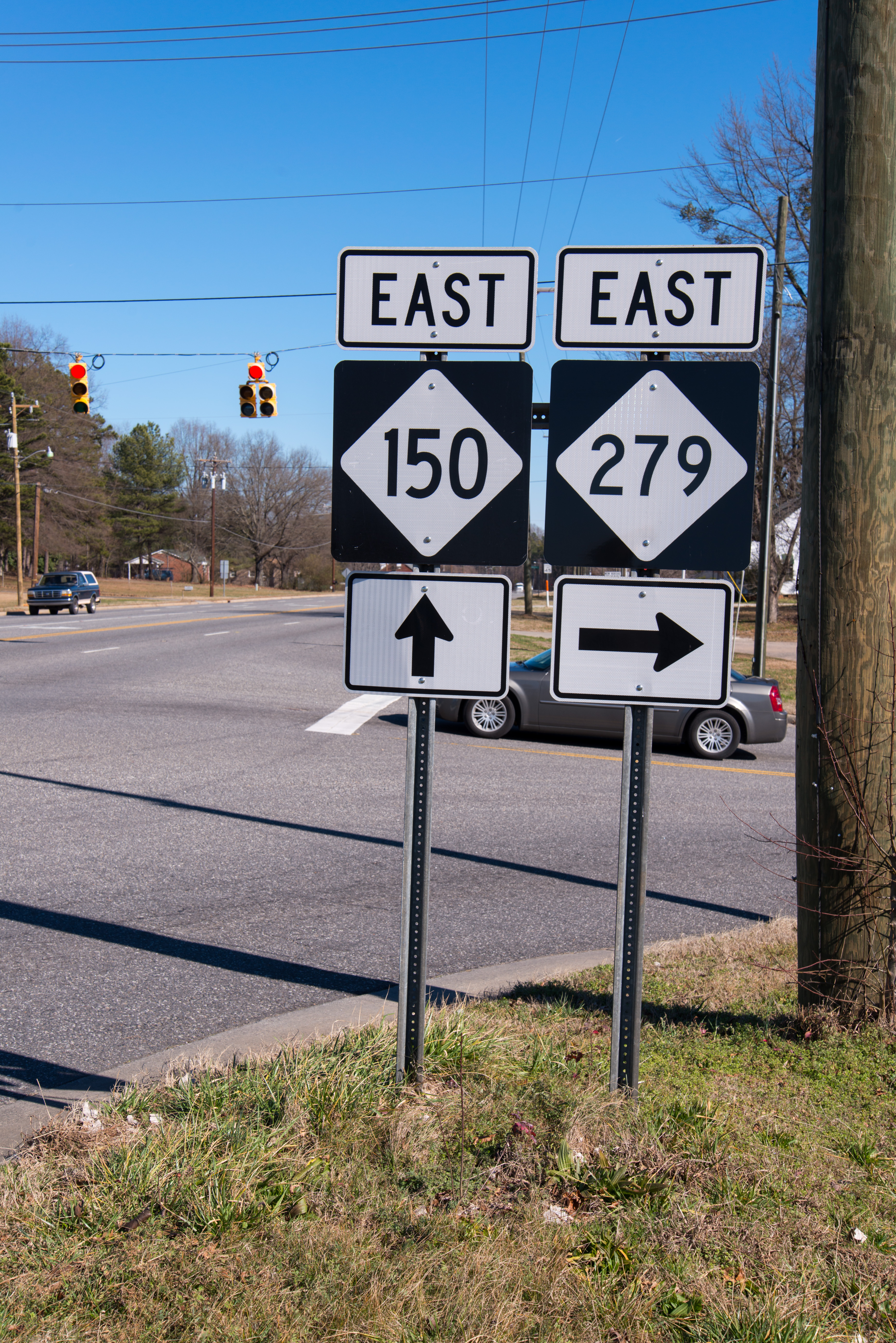
Directional signs of NC 150 and NC 279, in Cherryville

== History ==
Established in January 1979 as a renumbering of NC 277, it originally traversed from Cherryville to NC 275, in Dallas. In November 1979, NC 279 was extended southeast to the South Carolina state line; overlapping with NC 150 through Dallas and upgrading secondary roads Lower Dallas Highway (SR 2264) and New Hope Road (SR 2302). At some unknown date, NC 279's western terminus was redirected from the intersection of Church and Mountain streets to Church Street and Rudsil Avenue, in Cherryville.

=== North Carolina Highway 277 ===
North Carolina Highway 277
- Location: Cherryville-Dallas, NC
- Length: 12.5 mi (20.1 km)
- Existed: 1931–1979

North Carolina Highway 277 (NC 277) was established in 1931 as a new primary routing; it connected U.S. Route 74 (US 74)/NC 20, in Gastonia to NC 150 in Cherryville. In 1936, its southern terminus was truncated at NC 275 in Dallas. In 1938, its western terminus was moved through downtown Cherryville to NC 274; it is unknown when it was overlapped with NC 274 to end at Church and Mountain streets. Between 1954 and 1957, the alignment along the route was straightened, creating several small loop roads along the route, several of which say "Old NC 277". In 1979, NC 277 was renumbered to NC 279, to accommodate for Interstate 277.

== Junction list ==
The entire route is in Gaston County.

Location	mi	km	Destinations	Notes
Cherryville	0.0	0.0	NC 150 (Church Street)	
	2.9	4.7	Saint Marks Church Road – Crouse	Interchange
Dallas	11.3	18.2	NC 275 west (Dallas-Bessemer City Highway) – Bessemer City	West end of NC 275 overlap
Dallas	11.9	19.2	US 321 Bus. north (Dallas-High Shoals Highway)	West end of US 321 Business overlap
Dallas	12.0	19.3	US 321 / US 321 Bus. ends – Gastonia, Hickory	Interchange; east end of US 321 Business overlap
Dallas	513.1	825.8	NC 275 east (Dallas-Stanley Highway) – Stanley, Mount Holly	East end of NC 275 overlap
Gastonia	16.3	26.2	NC 7 (Ozark Avenue)	
Gastonia	17.1	27.5	I-85 – Spartanburg, Charlotte	Exit 20 (I-85)
Gastonia	17.6	28.3	US 29 / US 74 (Franklin Boulevard) – Belmont, Gastonia Municipal Airport	
	27.6	44.4	NC 273 north (Armstrong Road) – Belmont	Southern terminus of NC 273
	28.6	46.0	Pole Branch Road – Lake Wylie	South Carolina state line
1.000 mi = 1.609 km; 1.000 km = 0.621 mi: Concurrency terminus
