= Stowe Manor (North Carolina) =

Historic Estate in Belmont, North Carolina

- Alternative names: Samuel Pinckney Stowe House

General information
- Type: Residence
- Architectural style: Renaissance Revival
- Location: Belmont, North Carolina, United States, 217 South Central Avenue
- Completed: 1922; rebuilt 1924

Design and construction
- Architecture firm: White, Streeter & Chamberlain

Stowe Manor, also known as the Samuel Pinckney Stowe House, is a Renaissance Revival house in Belmont, Gaston County, North Carolina. Built in 1922 for textile manufacturer Samuel Pinckney Stowe and his family, it was reconstructed in 1924 after a fire. The house was designed by White, Streeter & Chamberlain, the Gastonia architectural partnership of Hugh Edward White, Charles J. Streeter and Carroll W. Chamberlain.

Architectural historian Davyd Foard Hood identified Stowe Manor as the most elaborate and costly residence designed by the partnership or by White in his subsequent individual practice. Its scale and detailing helped the firm attract further commissions from textile manufacturers and other business leaders.

The house and its detached garage are contributing resources in the Belmont Historic District, which entered the National Register of Historic Places in 1996. The property later became a wedding and event venue. David and Wendy Hostetler purchased it in 2021 and undertook a restoration that returned the house to residential use.

== History ==
=== Stowe family and the development of Belmont ===
Samuel Pinckney Stowe and his brother Robert Lee Stowe were merchants who became involved in textile manufacturing in 1899 through an investment in Ozark Mills in Gastonia. The success of that investment encouraged them to raise capital for a mill in Belmont. Working with other local investors, they helped establish Chronicle Mills, the town's first textile mill.

Chronicle Mills was chartered on March 18, 1901, and began production on February 28, 1902. It initially operated with steam power and later converted to electricity. Its expansion formed part of the development of Belmont as a textile manufacturing center.

The Stowe brothers, Abel Caleb Lineberger and their associates developed additional mills and related businesses. Samuel's interests included Majestic Manufacturing Company, Climax Spinning Company, Stowe Spinning Company, Sterling Spinning Company, Stowe Thread Company, Belmont Hosiery Mills and the Bank of Belmont. He married Ethel Patrick in 1915, following the death of his first wife, Mary Crawford.

The Belmont Historic District study identifies the Stowes and Lineberger as central figures in the town's industrial growth. By 1930, Belmont had twenty mills. The substantial houses commissioned by textile executives along South Central Avenue and North Main Street formed a prominent part of the town's residential architecture.

=== Construction and rebuilding ===
Stowe Manor was constructed in 1922 on South Central Avenue. A fire destroyed the house before the family moved in, and it was rebuilt in 1924.

White, Streeter & Chamberlain used the original design together with supplementary drawings for the reconstruction. Surviving architectural drawings dated 1924 are recorded as commission number 6 in Hood's inventory of the firm's work. The Historic Belmont Foundation states that rebuilding took nine months and that evidence of the fire remained on the basement walls.

=== Family residence and event venue ===
The Stowe family occupied the house until 1967, hosting family dinners, reunions and annual Easter egg hunts. In 1994, Samuel Stowe's grandson Sam and his wife Martha rehabilitated the property for weddings and special events. The house opened as an American Society of Interior Designers designer house, with rooms decorated by participating designers.

The property continued to operate as an event venue through the following decades. In November 2019, The Gaston Gazette reported that Boutique Belmont, a market for locally made goods, was returning to Stowe Manor for its second year.

== Architecture ==
=== Design and grounds ===
Stowe Manor is a two-and-a-half-story brick house with a hipped, pantile roof, a deep bracketed cornice and a central portico with a flat roof and classical detailing. It stands back from South Central Avenue on landscaped grounds. The detached garage has brick veneer and a hipped roof. The district nomination places the house among Belmont's grandest residences.

The 2021 property listing recorded a lot of 2.93 acres and a garage accommodating four cars. The house's main floor has twelve-foot ceilings. Its early domestic equipment included a laundry chute and a central vacuum system dating to the 1920s.

The estate's historical account describes a second floor originally arranged with six bedrooms and an additional room for a live-in household employee. Beamed ceilings and a large fireplace were among the interior features.

Interior features include ornamental plaster ceilings, a staircase hall rising nearly 26 feet, heart-pine floors upstairs and oak floors on the main level.

NC State University's architectural catalogue compares the house with the Abel Caleb Lineberger Sr. House on North Main Street, designed by Charles Christian Hook. Both belong to the group of Renaissance Revival residences built for Belmont's textile manufacturers.

=== Architects and architectural significance ===
Hugh Edward White established a practice in Gastonia after a career that included supervising federal construction for the Office of the Supervising Architect of the United States Treasury. From 1903 to 1918, his assignments included post offices in several states. He subsequently worked for South Carolina architect Charles C. Wilson before forming White, Streeter & Chamberlain in 1921.

The partnership became a leading architectural practice in Gaston County during the textile industry's expansion. Its commissions included Gastonia High School, Gastonia Municipal Building and Citizens National Bank, as well as residences for industrialists throughout the western Piedmont. NC State's biographical account records nearly 300 projects undertaken by White and the partnership between 1894 and 1939.

Stowe Manor was one of the partnership's early residential commissions, obtained while Gastonia High School was under construction. Hood linked the commission's importance to both Samuel Stowe's patronage and the architectural treatment of the house. He identified the later John L. Beal House in Gastonia and Noah Benjamin Kendrick House in Cherryville as residences that emulated the scale and richness of the Stowe design.

== Restoration ==
David and Wendy Hostetler acquired Stowe Manor in December 2021 for $2.2 million. The work that followed combined repairs to the historic building with alterations for its use as a private residence.

According to the owners' restoration chronology, work began in 2022 with repairs to roofs, soffits, structural supports and water-damaged woodwork. Deteriorated balustrades were replaced with custom cypress components, copper gutters were installed, and porch columns, windows and doors were repaired. Original library French doors found in the basement were reinstated.

Interior work included plaster restoration, refinishing original wood floors, and replacement of electrical, plumbing and heating systems. An elevator replaced the rear service staircase. The kitchen incorporated an adjoining porch, and its ceiling was returned to twelve feet. A first-floor bedroom suite retained original picture moldings and coffered ceilings, while upstairs bedrooms received en-suite bathrooms.

The conservatory floor was rebuilt over an excavated crawl space, with new tile reproducing its gray-and-white checked pattern. Its original doors and windows were restored. The Hostetlers moved into the house in September 2023. Work continued on the grounds in 2024, including landscaping, a swimming pool and spa, and new paths and terraces.

On May 9, 2026, the grounds opened for a fundraising event benefiting the Historic Belmont Foundation and the Gaston County Art Guild. Chloe Collins's report in The Gaston Gazette described visitors viewing the gardens and learning about the exterior restoration. An accompanying photo feature by Mike Hensdill documented the Hostetlers, outdoor seating and dining spaces, and the pool and fountain area.

== Film locations ==
Stowe Manor has been used as a filming location. In February 2017, scenes for American Animals were filmed inside the house. The Gaston Gazette reported the presence of film crews, actors and production trailers at the manor and another Belmont location.

The house also appeared in Gigi & Nate. In a 2023 account of a presentation to the Belmont Rotary Club, film location scout and production manager Wende Whitus described a party scene filmed at Stowe Manor with approximately 200 local teenagers as extras.

== Historic recognition ==
Stowe Manor and its garage are identified as contributing resources 148 and 148a in the Belmont Historic District nomination. The district was added to the National Register of Historic Places on December 27, 1996.

Gaston County's historic-marker program commemorates the property as the S.P. and E.P. Stowe House. The marker credits Hugh E. White with its design and associates the residence with Samuel and Ethel Stowe.
