= Charles Christian Hook =

American architect (1870–1938)

Charles Christian Hook (1870–1938) was an American architect. He was also the founder of FreemanWhite, Inc. a Haskell Company (1892), the oldest practicing firm in North Carolina and currently the 11th oldest architecture firm in the United States.

A number of his works are listed on the U.S. National Register of Historic Places.

== Notable works ==
- Avery Avenue School, 200 Avery Ave., Morganton, North Carolina (Hook, Charles Christian), NRHP-listed
- John Blue House, 200 Blue St., Aberdeen, North Carolina (Hooker, Charles), NRHP-listed
- Central Elementary School, 250 N. Third St., Albemarle, North Carolina
- Charlotte Woman's Club headquarters, 1001 E. Morehead St, Charlotte, North Carolina.
- Clayton Graded School and Clayton Grammar School-Municipal Auditorium, 101 and 111 2nd St., Clayton, North Carolina (Hook, Charles Christian), NRHP-listed
- Cleveland School, 8968 Cleveland Rd., Clayton, North Carolina (Hook, Charles C.), NRHP-listed
- James Buchanan Duke House, 400 Hermitage Rd., Charlotte, North Carolina (Hook, Charles C.), NRHP-listed
- Greer Depot, 311 Trade St., Greer, South Carolina (Hook, Charles Christian), NRHP-listed
- Greensboro Historical Museum (Smith Memorial Building), Greensboro, North Carolina, NRHP-listed
- Greystone, 618 Morhead Ave., Durham, North Carolina (Hook, Charles C.), NRHP-listed
- Hambley-Wallace House, 508 S. Fulton St., Salisbury, North Carolina, NRHP-listed
- Hickory Municipal Building, 30 Third St., SW, Hickory, North Carolina (Hook, Charles Christian), NRHP-listed
- Richmond County Courthouse, Franklin St. between Hancock and Lee Sts., Rockingham, North Carolina (Hook, Charles C.), NRHP-listed
- Charlotte station (Seaboard Air Line Railroad), 1000 N. Tyron St., Charlotte, North Carolina (Hook, Charles Christian), NRHP-listed
- One or more works in Aberdeen Historic District, roughly bounded by Maple Ave., Bethesda Ave., Campbell St., Main St., Pine St., South St., and Poplar St., Aberdeen, North Carolina (Hook, C.C.), NRHP-listed
- One or more works in Belmont Historic District, roughly bounded by Sacred Heart College campus, RR line, N. and S. Main, Glenway, Bryant Sts., Keener Blvd., Central Ave, Belmont, North Carolina (Hook, Charles Christian), NRHP-listed
- One or more works in Converse College Historic District, 580 E. Main St., Spartanburg, South Carolina (Hook, Charles), NRHP-listed
- One or more works in Dilworth Historic District (Boundary Increase), E side 2000 Blk. Euclid Ave., both sides 2000 blk. of Lyndhurst Ave., Charlotte, North Carolina (Hook, C.C.), NRHP-listed
- One or more works in Waxhaw-Weddington Roads Historic District, jct. of NC 75, NC 34 & W. Franklin St., Monroe, North Carolina (Hook, Charles Christian), NRHP-listed

== See also ==
- Greensboro Historical Museum, 130 Summit Ave., Greensboro, NC (Hook,A.C.), NRHP-listed
