= Greensboro History Museum =

- U.S. National Register of Historic Places
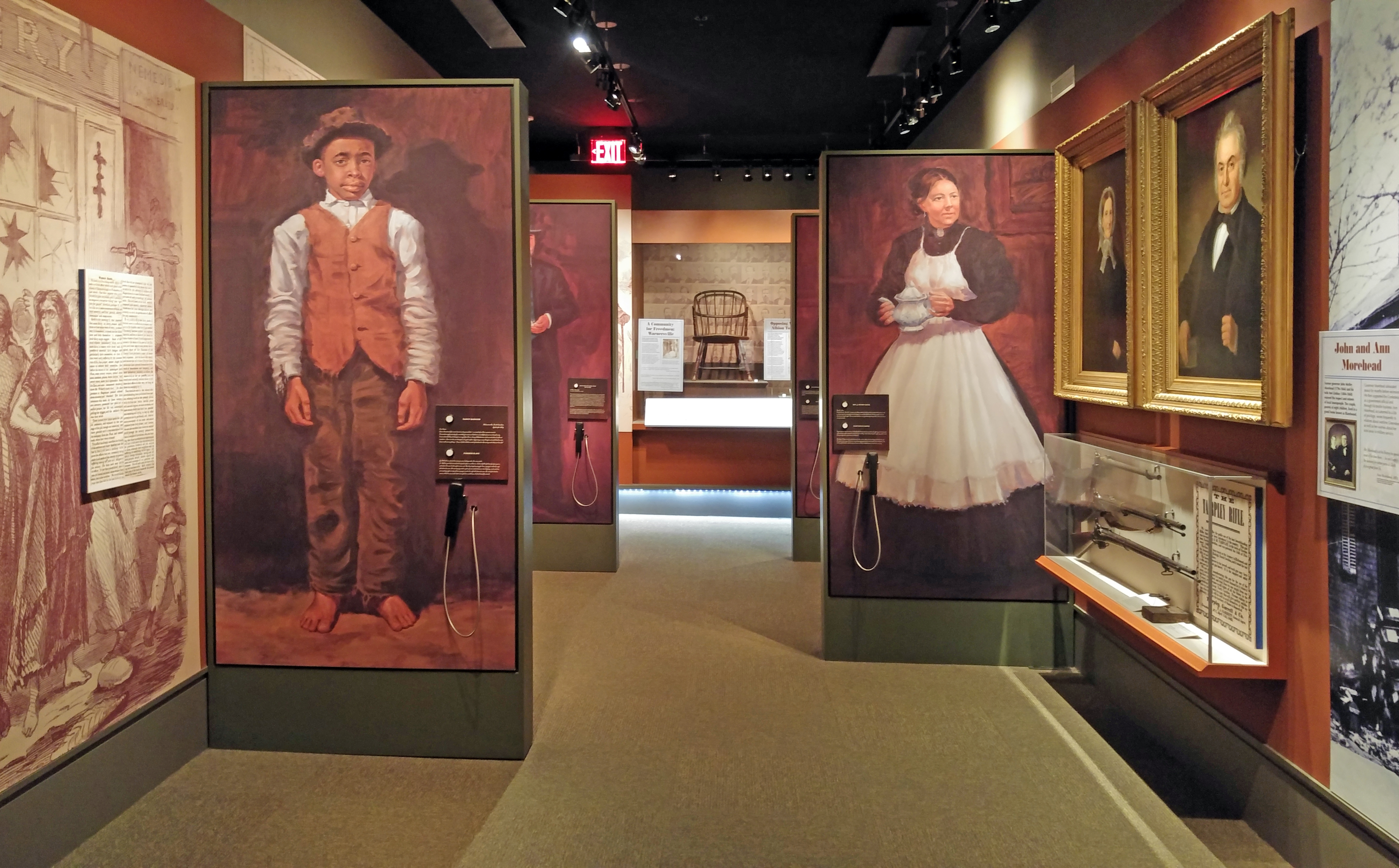

- Location within North Carolina Location within the United States
- Location: 130 Summit Ave., Greensboro, North Carolina
- Coordinates: 36°4′32″N 79°47′17″W
- Area: 1.7 acres (0.69 ha)
- Built: 1812, 1892, 1903, 1938
- Architect: Hook, A.C.; Et al.
- Architectural style: Romanesque
- NRHP reference No.: 85000877
- Added to NRHP: April 25, 1985

The Greensboro History Museum, consisting of the former First Presbyterian Church of Greensboro and Smith Memorial Building, is a historic museum building located at 130 Summit Ave. in Greensboro, Guilford County, North Carolina. The former Presbyterian church was built in 1892 on the site of a former Confederate hospital, and is a Romanesque Revival-style brick building with a cross gable roof and tower. The semi-circular, 11 bay, Smith Memorial Building was built in 1903. It features four octagonal sides and a tower. The memorial building was designed by the architect Charles Christian Hook (1870-1938). The church and memorial building were connected and the older structures modified and renovated in 1938. Also located on the property is the First Presbyterian Church cemetery, established in 1831, after the first church was built on land that was donated by Jesse H. Lindsay. The church vacated the property in 1929, and in 1937-1938 it was renovated and enlarged as the Richardson Civic Center and donated to the city of Greensboro. It subsequently housed the Greensboro Public Library, the Greensboro Historical Museum, and the Greensboro Art Center. The historic building functions as one part of the current, larger Greenboro History Museum.

It was listed on the National Register of Historic Places in 1985.

== Notable burials ==
- Attorney and justice Robert P. Dick (1823-1898)
- Representative and Confederate senator John Adams Gilmer (1805-1868)
- North Carolina Governor John Motley Morehead (1796-1866)

== Gallery ==
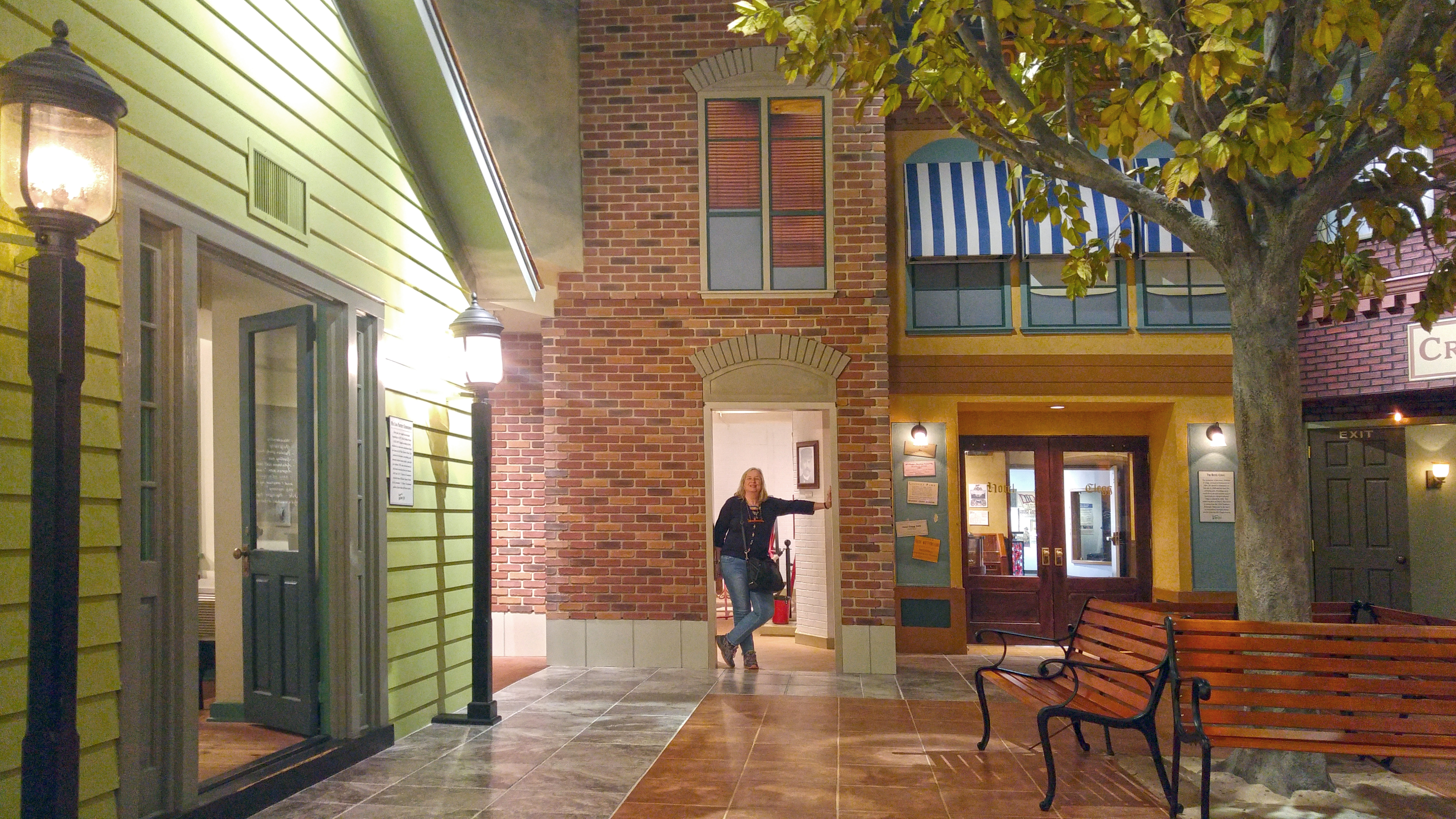

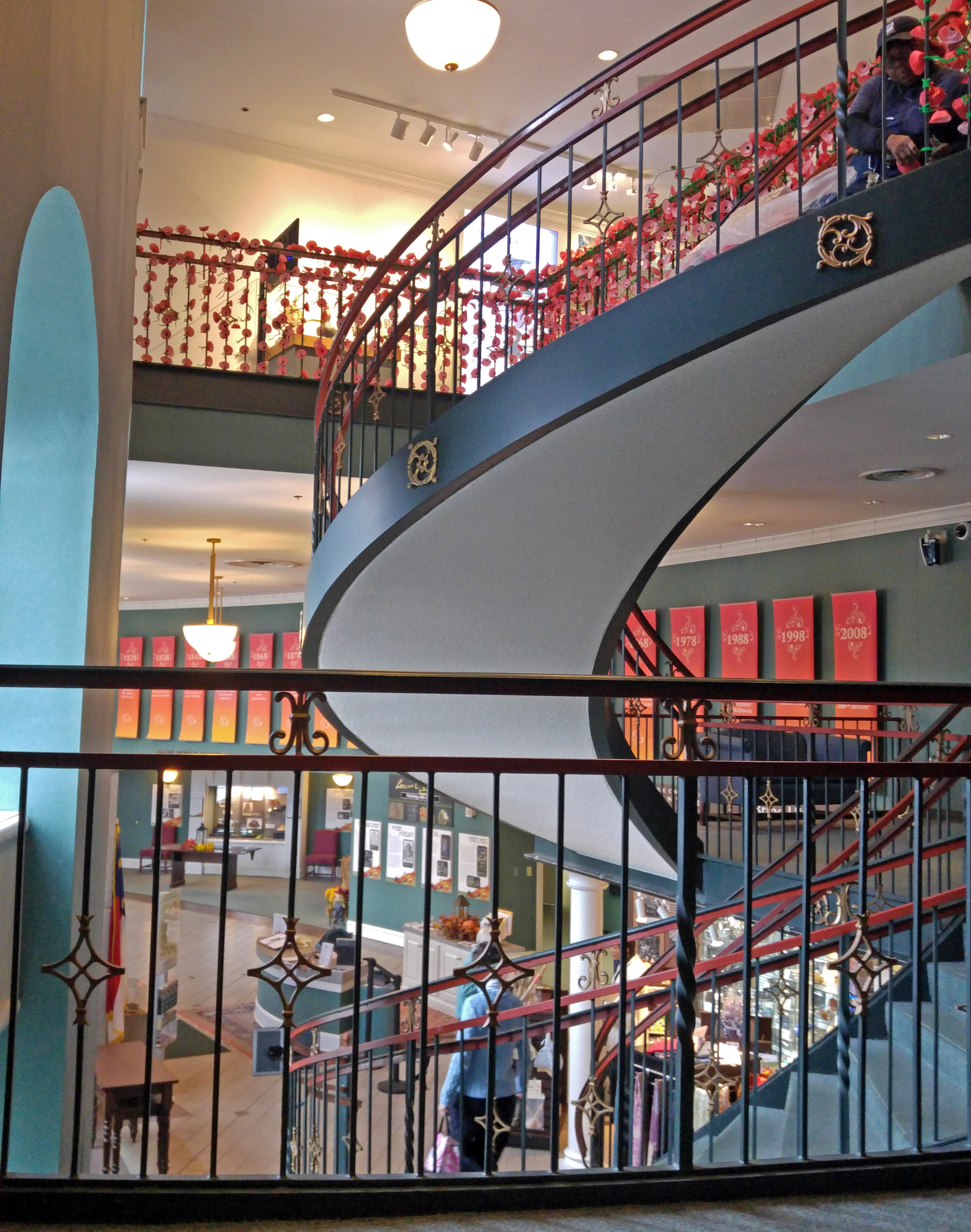

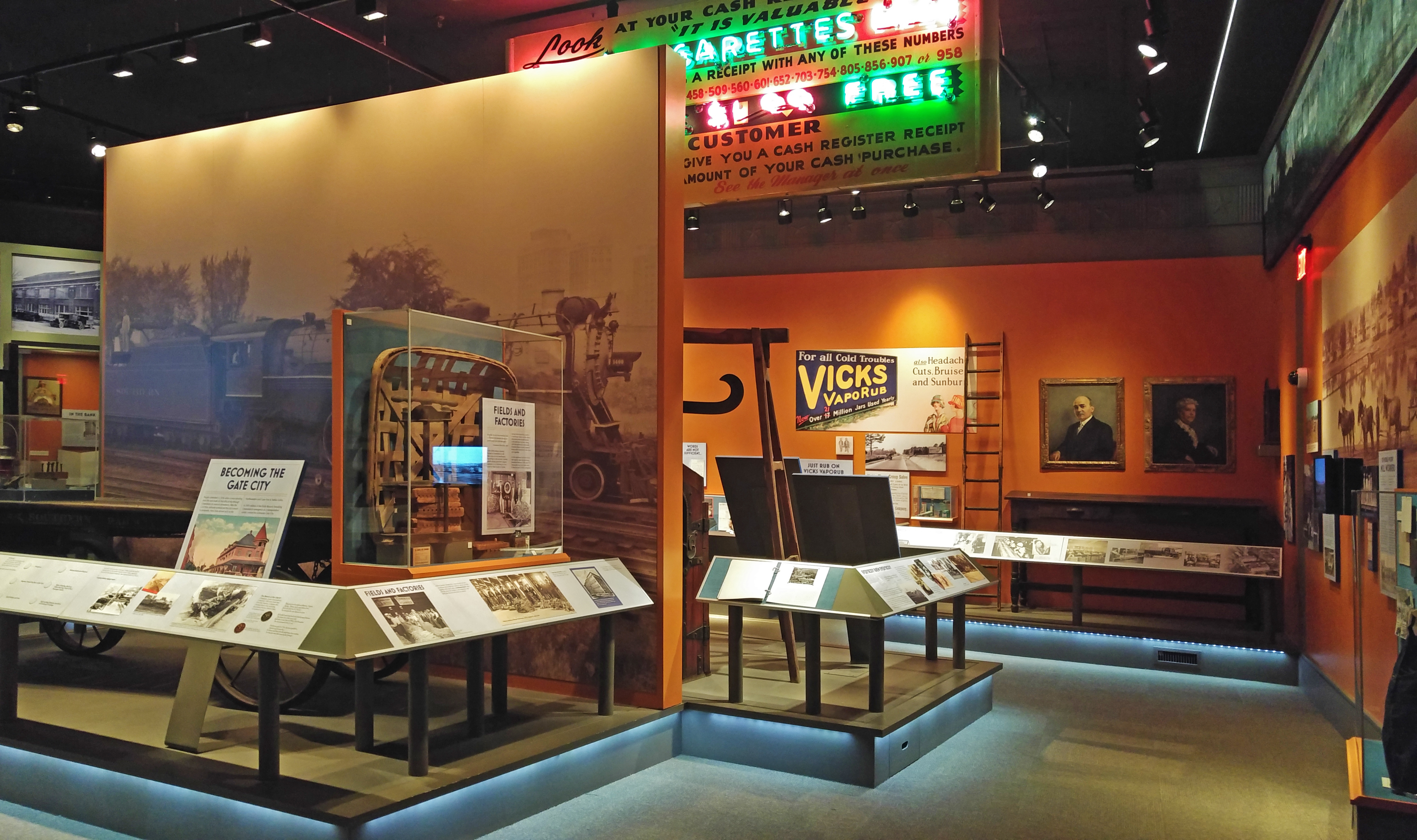

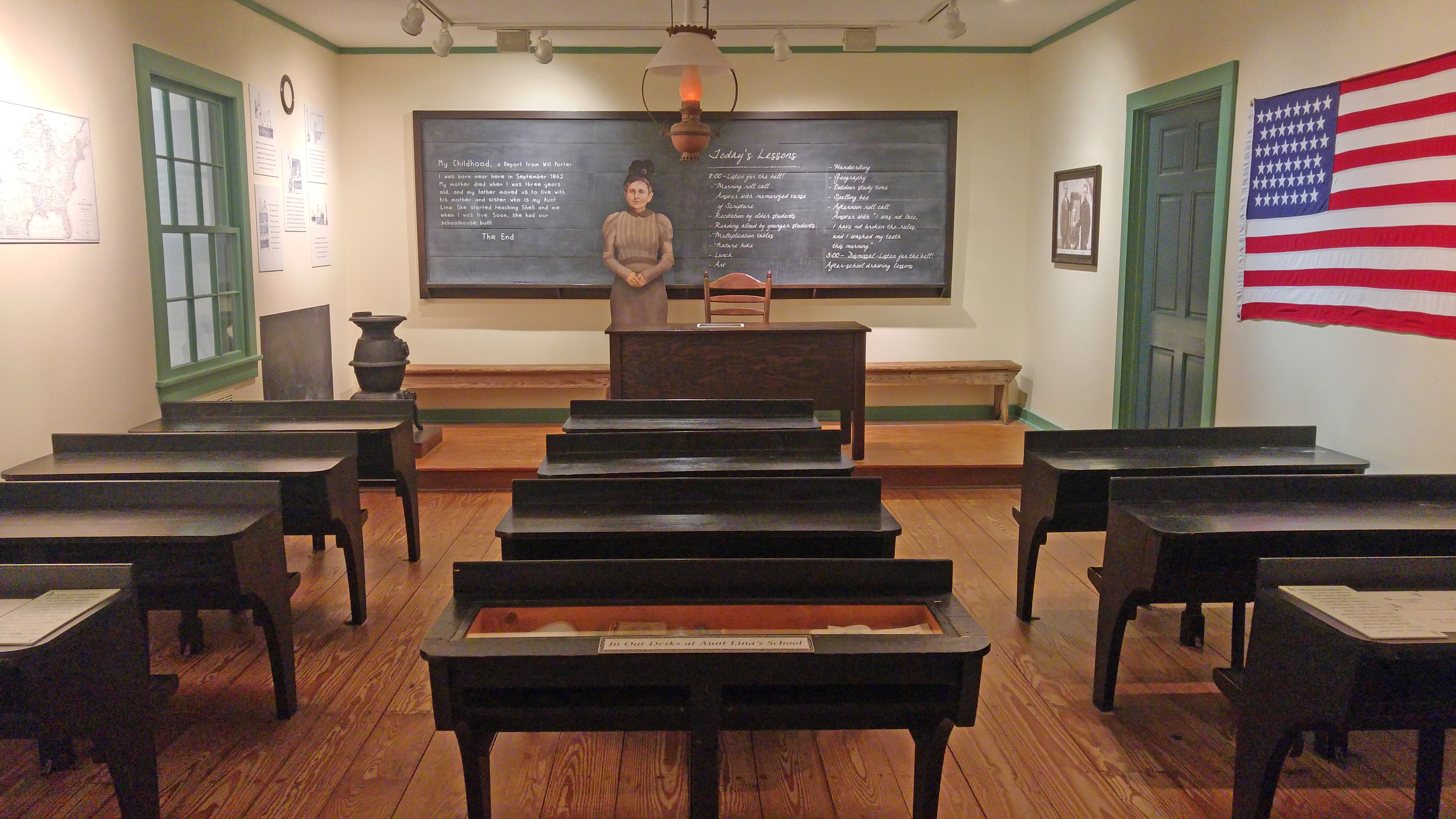

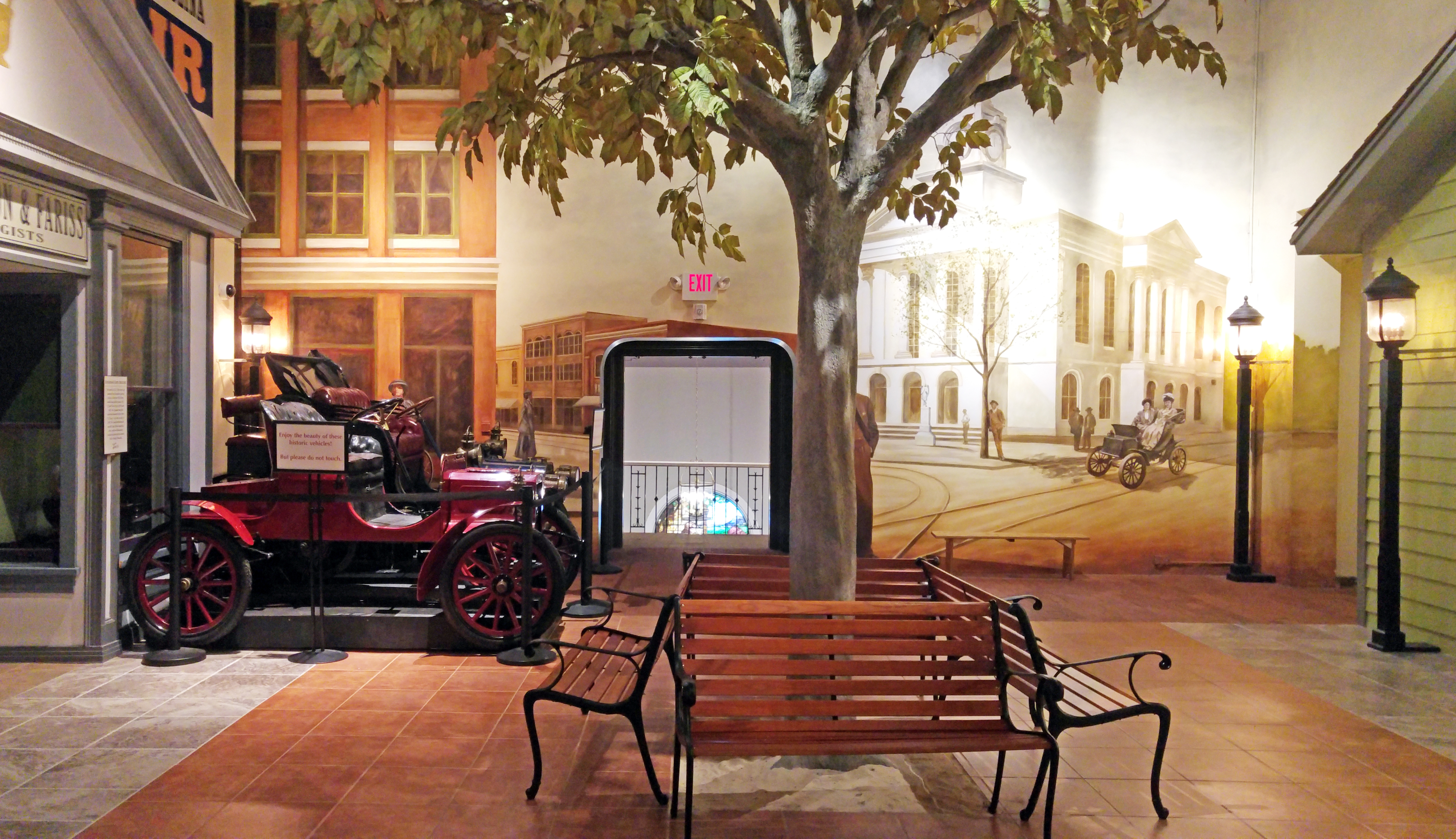

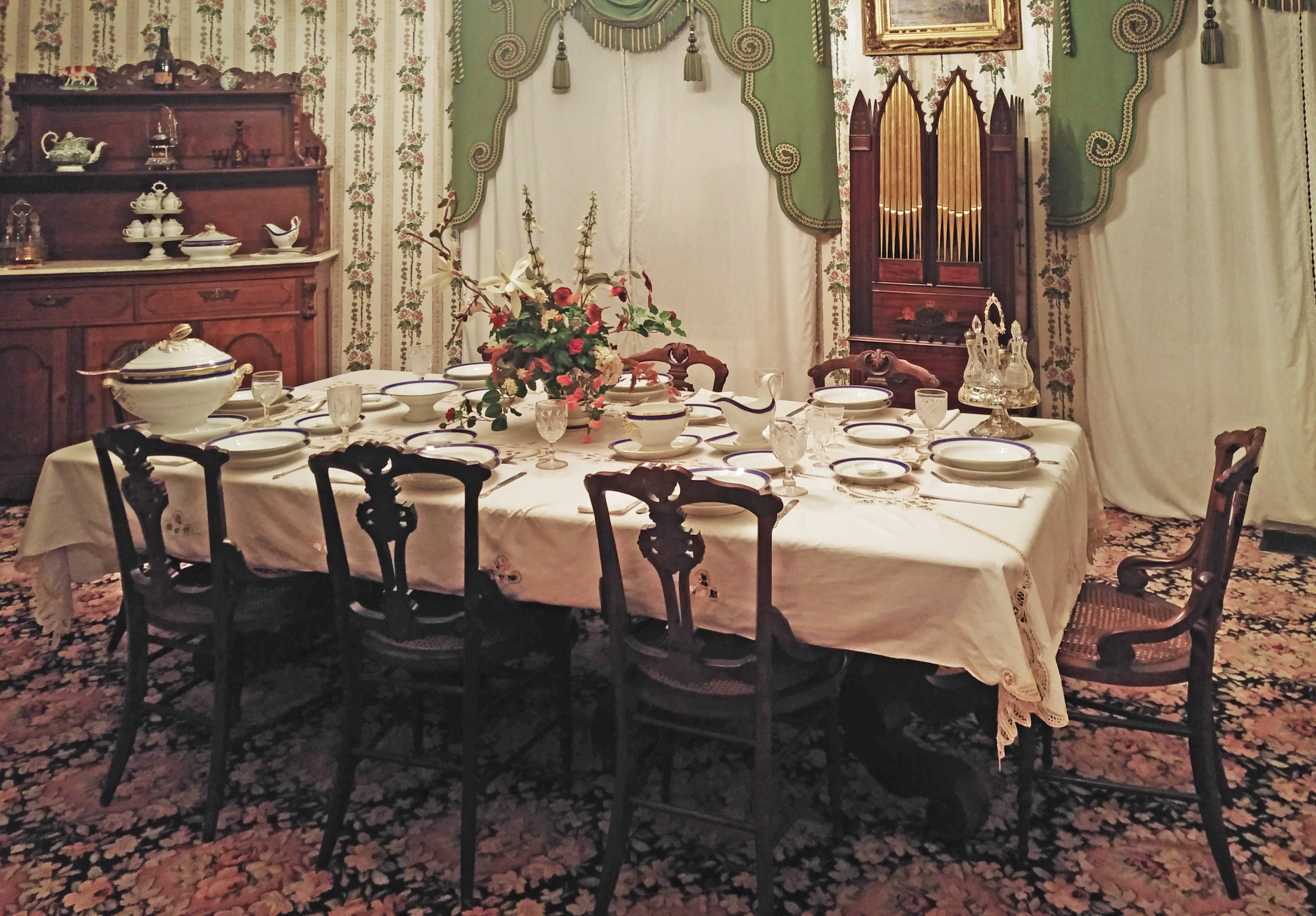

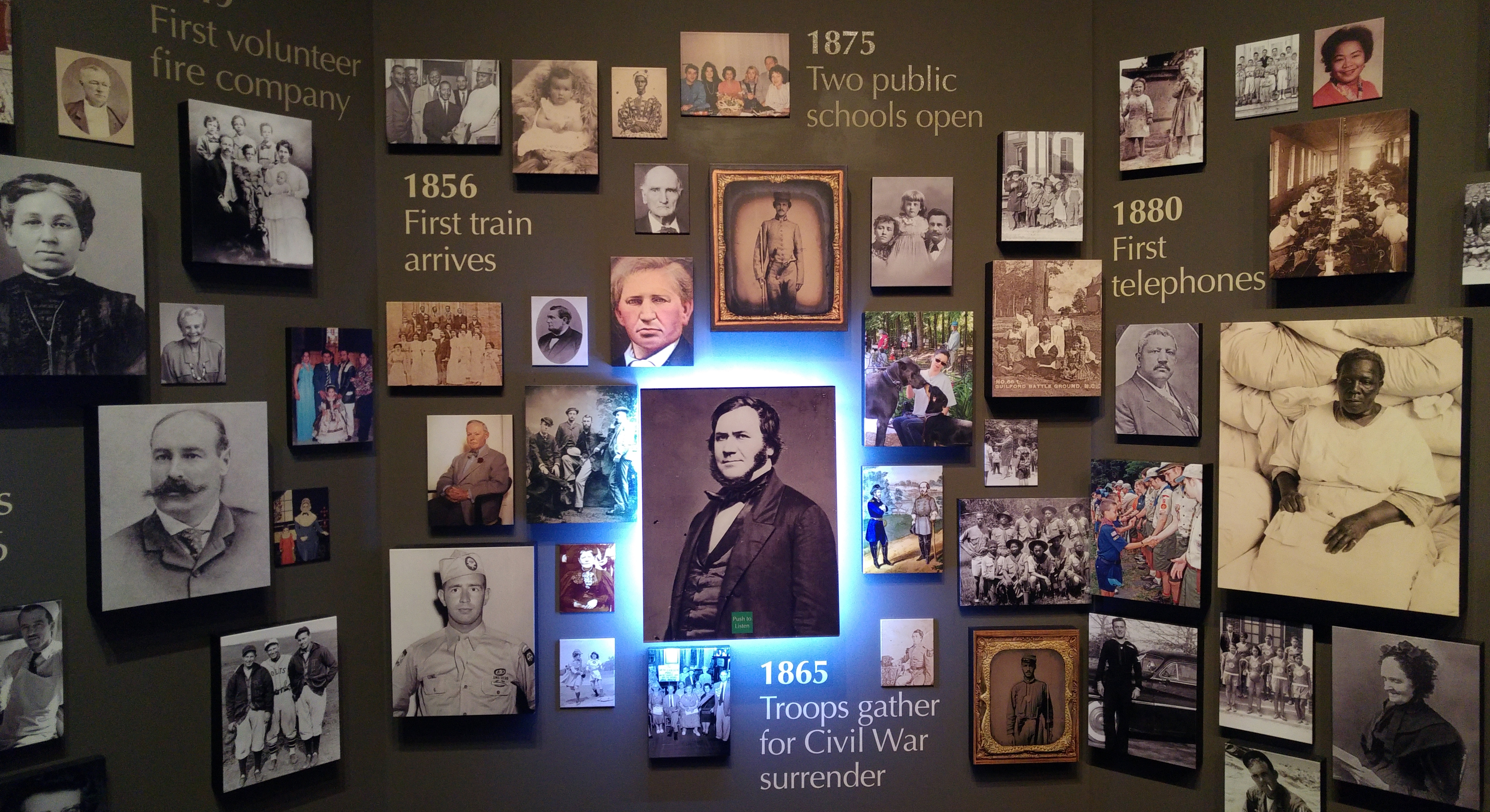

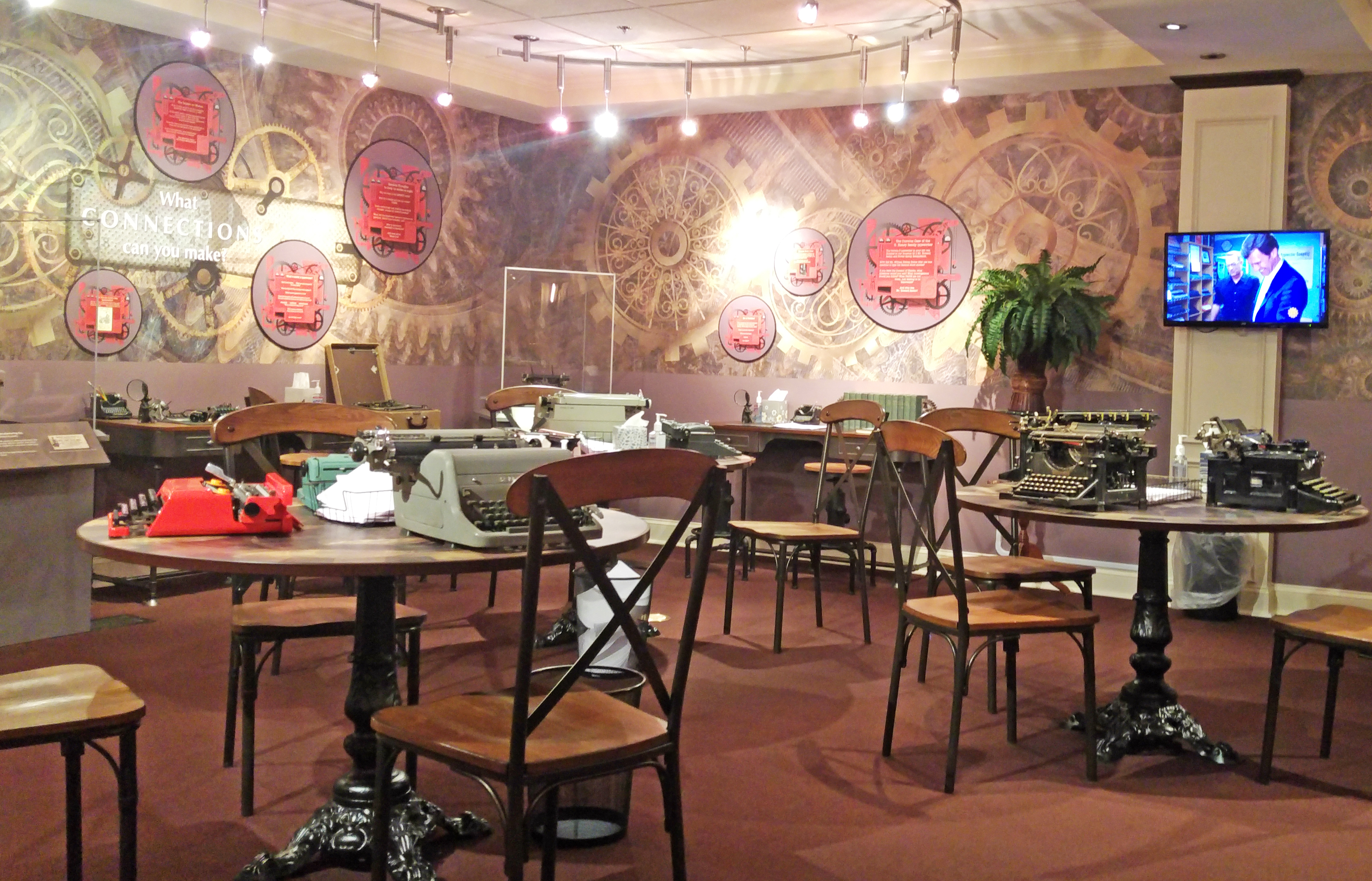

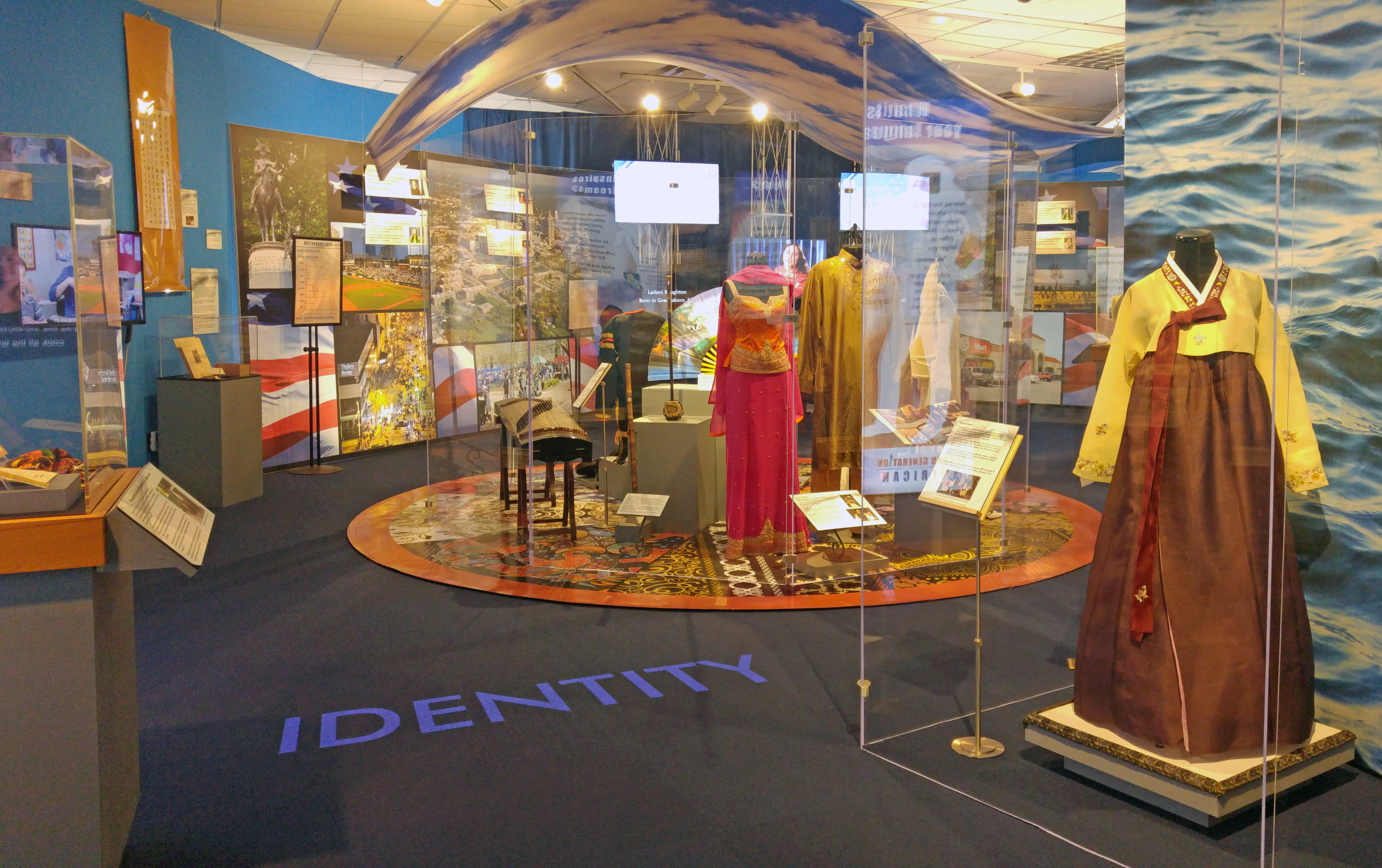

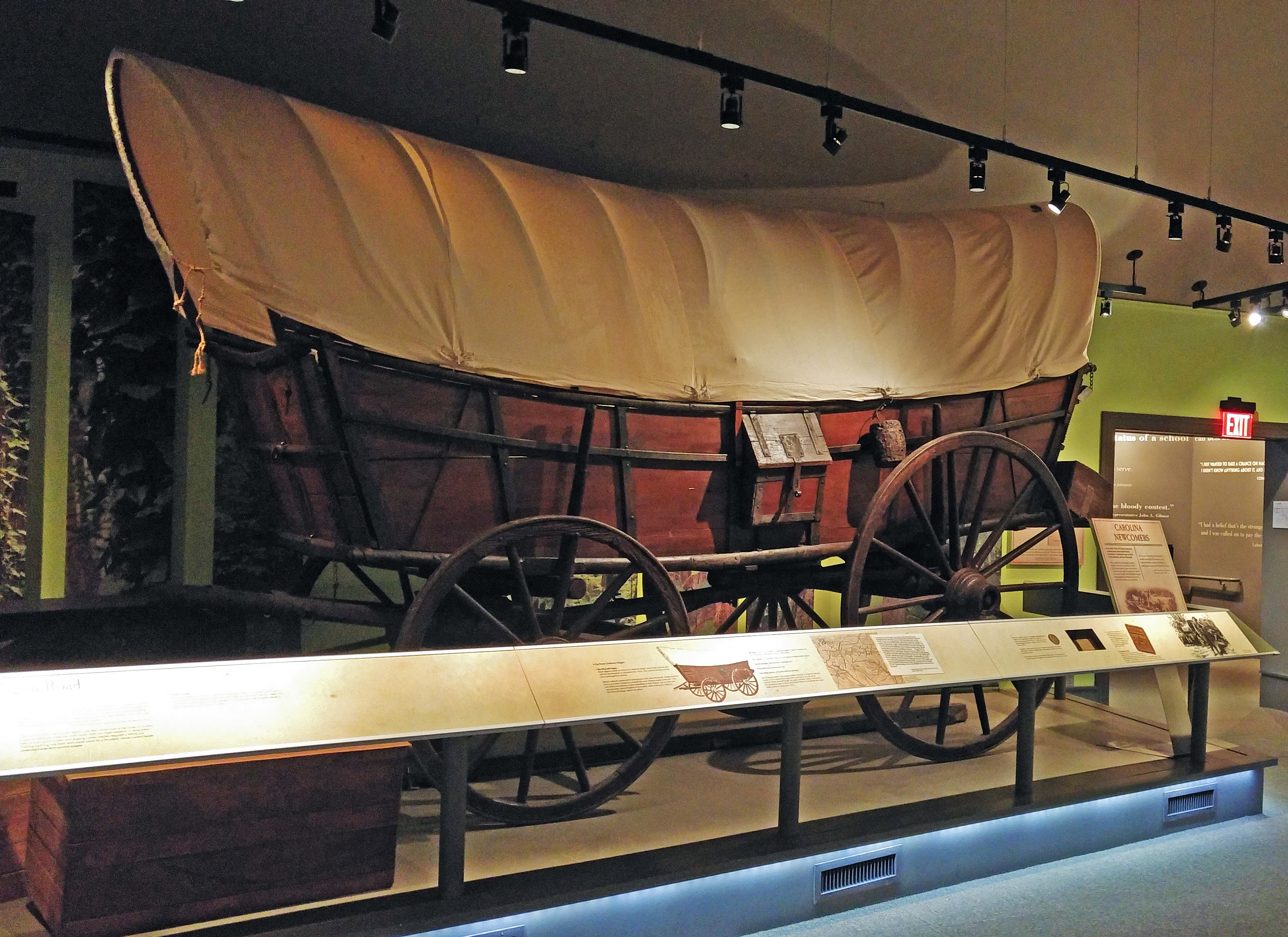
