= Hambley–Wallace House =

Historic house in North Carolina, United States

- U.S. National Register of Historic Places
- U.S. Historic district – Contributing property
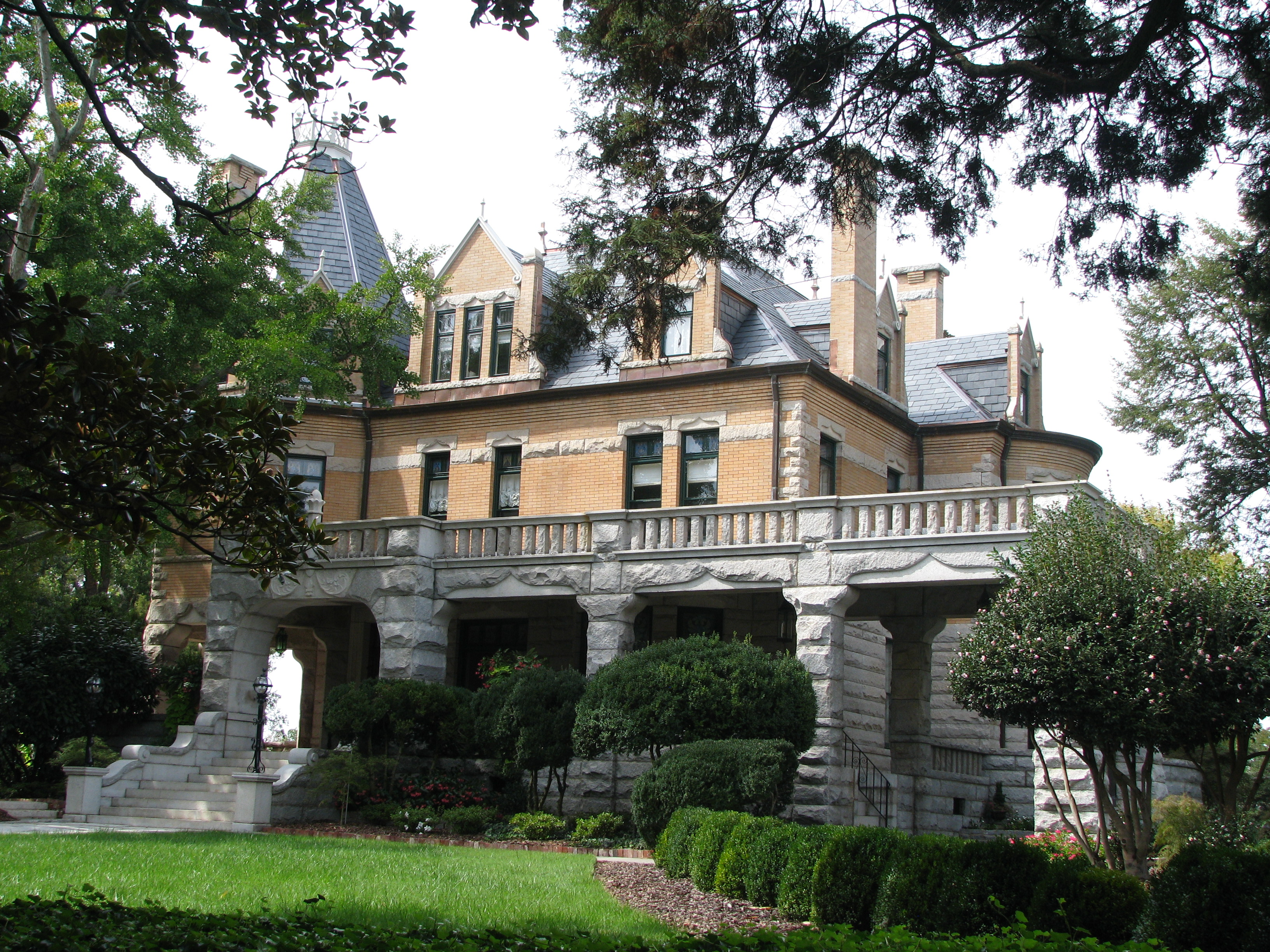
- Hambley–Wallace House, September 2012

- Location within North Carolina Location within the United States
- Location: 508 S. Fulton St., Salisbury, North Carolina
- Coordinates: 35°39′59″N 80°28′42″W
- Area: 1.7 acres (0.69 ha)
- Built: 1901-1903
- Built by: Lazenby. Alfred Ross
- Architect: Hook, Charles Christian
- Architectural style: Late 19th And 20th Century Revivals, Chateauesque
- NRHP reference No.: 97001545
- Added to NRHP: December 15, 1997

Hambley–Wallace House, also known as the Wallace House, is a historic home located at Salisbury, Rowan County, North Carolina. It was designed by architect Charles Christian Hook and built between 1901 and 1903 by the Lazenby Brothers, for British mining engineer Egbert Hambley and his family. It is a large 2 1/2-story granite and brick Châteauesque-style mansion with a tall hipped slate roof. It features an offset, conical-roof tower, two-story projecting bay, and wraparound arcaded porch. Other contributing resources are the playhouse (c. 1915–1920), a stable / servant's quarters (c. 1903–1904), and the landscaped grounds (c. 1904–present). Historian Davyd Foard Hood said the decision to use Châteauesque architecture was the result of the recent completion of Biltmore House. Thomas Meehan & Sons of Philadelphia did additional work on the property in 1904.

It was listed on the National Register of Historic Places in 1997. It is located in the Salisbury Historic District.

Lottie Hambley sold the house to John David and Mary Napoleon Norwood in 1917. The Norwoods eventually had financial problems and, although Mary Norwood was able to buy the house at auction in 1923, she defaulted on the mortgage. Leo Wallace Jr. and Virginia Wallace bought the house for $55,500 at auction in 1927. Members of the Wallace family have lived in the house since then. Leo and Virginia Wallace lived in the house for 70 years. Virginia Wallace loved roses, and it happened that the original deed required that a rose garden would always be included on the property. Leo's son Lee and his wife Mona Lisa Wallace bought the house in 2011 and restored it.
