= Cleveland School (Clayton, North Carolina) =

Historic school building in North Carolina, United States

- U.S. National Register of Historic Places
- Location within North Carolina Location within the United States
- Location: 8968 Cleveland Rd., near Clayton, North Carolina
- Coordinates: 35°34′6″N 78°31′43″W
- Area: 2 acres (0.81 ha)
- Built: 1926-1927, 1932, 1938, 1955
- Built by: Rogers, J.P.
- Architect: Hook, Charles C.
- Architectural style: Classical Revival
- NRHP reference No.: 05000961
- Added to NRHP: September 7, 2005

The Cleveland School, also known as Cleveland Middle School, is a historic school complex located in Cleveland, Johnston County, North Carolina. It was designed by architect Charles C. Hook and built in 1926–1927, with flanking wings added in 1932 and 1938. It is a two-story, five-bay, U-shaped, Classical Revival-style brick building on a raised basement. It features a projecting center bay with recessed main entrance and end bays with blind windows. Also on the property are the contributing well house (c. 1927), bathroom (c. 1927), and gymnasium (1955).

It was listed on the National Register of Historic Places in 2005.
