= Belmont Hosiery Mill =

Historic building in North Carolina, US

- U.S. National Register of Historic Places
- Location within North Carolina Location within the United States
- Location: 608 S. Main St., Belmont, North Carolina
- Coordinates: 35°14′15″N 81°2′54″W
- Area: 6.6 acres (2.7 ha)
- Built: 1945-1946, 1952, 1958, 1969, c. 1998
- Built by: Southern Engineering Inc.
- Architect: Biberstein, Herman V.
- Architectural style: Moderne
- NRHP reference No.: 02000987
- Added to NRHP: September 16, 2002

Belmont Hosiery Mill was a historic textile mill building located at Belmont, Gaston County, North Carolina. The original section was built in 1945–1946, and was a two-story-on-basement brick mill building. In 1952, a two-bay-deep, two-story-on basement addition was built and in 1958, a two-story-on-basement rectangular addition was built and features Art Moderne detailing. In 1969, a roughly U-shaped two-story-on-basement addition was built at the rear of the mill. A small one-story loading dock addition completed around 1998. The mill closed in 2000. The mill has been demolished.

It was listed on the National Register of Historic Places in 2002.
