= Egbert Hambley =

British-born American mining engineer

Egbert Barry Hambley
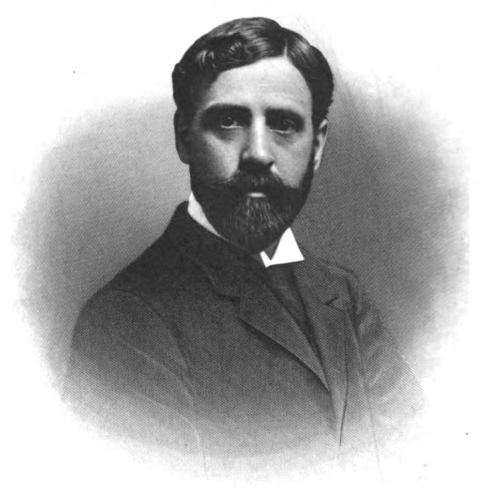
- Born: Egbert Barry Cornwall Hambley; 2 May 1862; Penzance, England
- Died: 13 August 1906 (aged 44); Salisbury, North Carolina
- Education: Treveth House School
- Occupation(s): Engineer, Assistant Principal of Gold Hill Mines
- Spouse: Charlotte "Lottie" Clark Coleman (m. 1887)
- Children: Littleton Hambley Gilbert Hambley William H Hambley James Y Hambley Charlotte I Hambley

Signature
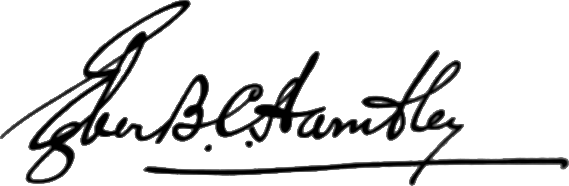

Egbert Barry Cornwall Hambley (2 May 1862 – 13 August 1906) was a British-born mining engineer and power company executive, who worked for much of his career in North Carolina.

== Early life and education ==
Egbert Hambley was born in Penzance, Cornwall, the son of James Hambley (a civil engineer) and Ellen Read Hambley. He was educated at Trevath House School and the Royal School of Mines.

== Career ==
Hambley spent three years as a young man helping to run the Gold Hill gold mines in Rowan County, North Carolina, 1881–1884. After that job, he changed engineering firms, working for John Taylor & Sons at mines around the world, from Mexico to South Africa, from India to Norway. In 1887, he was back in North Carolina, as a consulting engineer, working for British interests in the state. He was managing director of the Sam Christian Hydraulic Company, and founded the Salisbury Gas and Electric Light Company.

He partnered with George I. Whitney of Pittsburgh to form the Whitney Reduction Company, which had projects in several American states; the centrepiece of their efforts was a planned hydroelectric plant on the Yadkin River, with a model town called "Whitney." Hambley's sudden death and construction delays meant the project was abandoned and the Whitney Reduction Company was dissolved by 1910. Their Yadkin dam project was taken over by a predecessor of Alcoa Power Generating Inc. and completed by Alcoa some years later at nearby Badin, North Carolina.

Hambley also owned several granite quarries in North Carolina, which he hoped to develop into a large-scale commercial venture. He was elected a Fellow of the Geological Society of London in 1890.

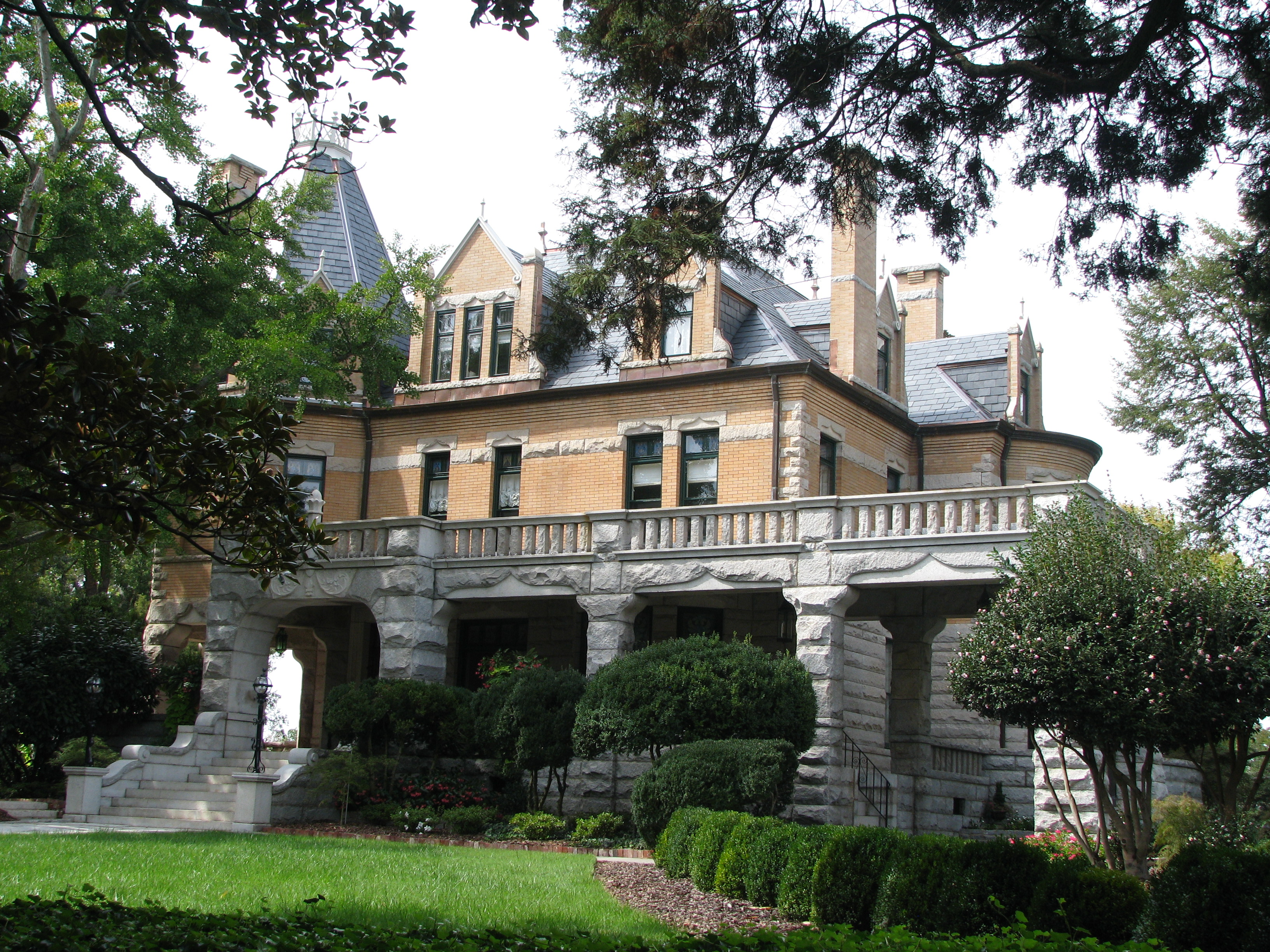
Hambley–Wallace House Salisbury NC, built for E. B. C. Hambley and family in 1902-3

== Personal life ==
Egbert Hambley married Charlotte "Lottie" Clark Coleman, from a prominent North Carolina family, in 1887. They were married by the Rev. Samuel Rothrock, who was Charlotte's Uncle. They lived on a farm, where Egbert Hambley raised prize Jersey cows as a side interest. After 1903 they lived in an "unusually handsome" large house in Salisbury, North Carolina, and had five children together before Egbert Hambley died suddenly from typhoid in 1906, aged 44 years. His death was pronounced "a grief to the whole South," by the Charlotte Observer, "for which section he was doing more than any living man."

A small collection of his papers is archived in the library at Pfeiffer University.
