= Belmont City Hall =

Historic government building in North Carolina, US

- Former U.S. Post Office
- U.S. National Register of Historic Places
- U.S. Historic district – Contributing property
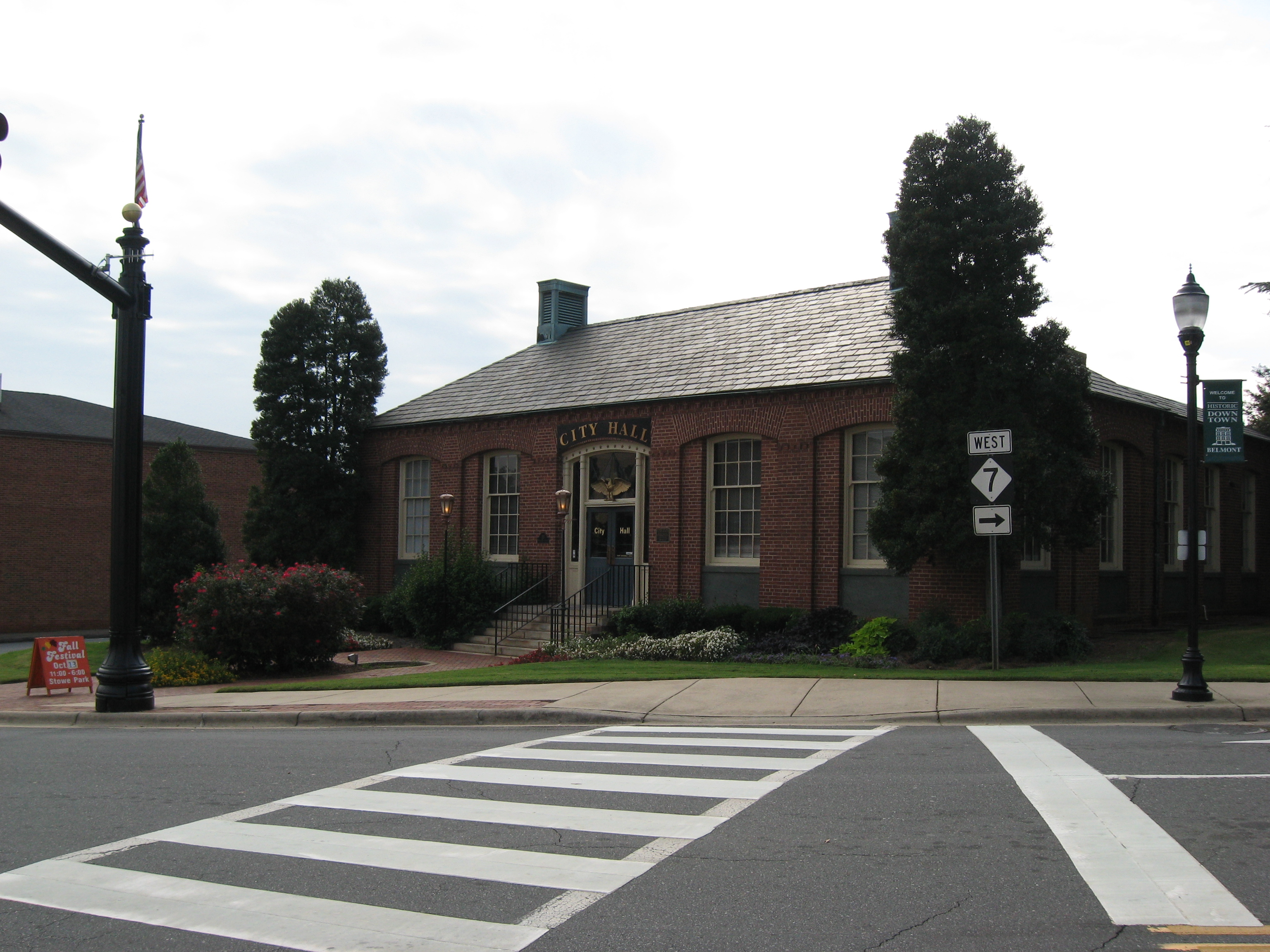
- The building in September 2012

- Location within North Carolina Location within the United States
- Location: 115 N. Main Street, Belmont, North Carolina
- Coordinates: 35°14′37″N 81°2′18″W
- Area: less than one acre
- Built: 1939
- Architect: Louis A. Simon
- Architectural style: Colonial Revival
- NRHP reference No.: 95001401
- Added to NRHP: November 29, 1995

The Belmont City Hall, also known as the Former United States Post Office, is a historic post office building located in Belmont, Gaston County, North Carolina. It was designed by the Treasury Department's Office of the Supervising Architect under the direction of Louis A. Simon, and built in 1939. It is a one-story, five bay Colonial Revival-style brick building. At the rear is a stepped-back rectangular secondary block and loading dock. It housed the Belmont post office until 1970, then was converted for use as the Belmont City Hall in 1973.

The building was listed on the National Register of Historic Places in 1995. It is located in the Belmont Historic District.
