= Greystone (Durham, North Carolina) =

Historic house in North Carolina, United States

- U.S. National Register of Historic Places
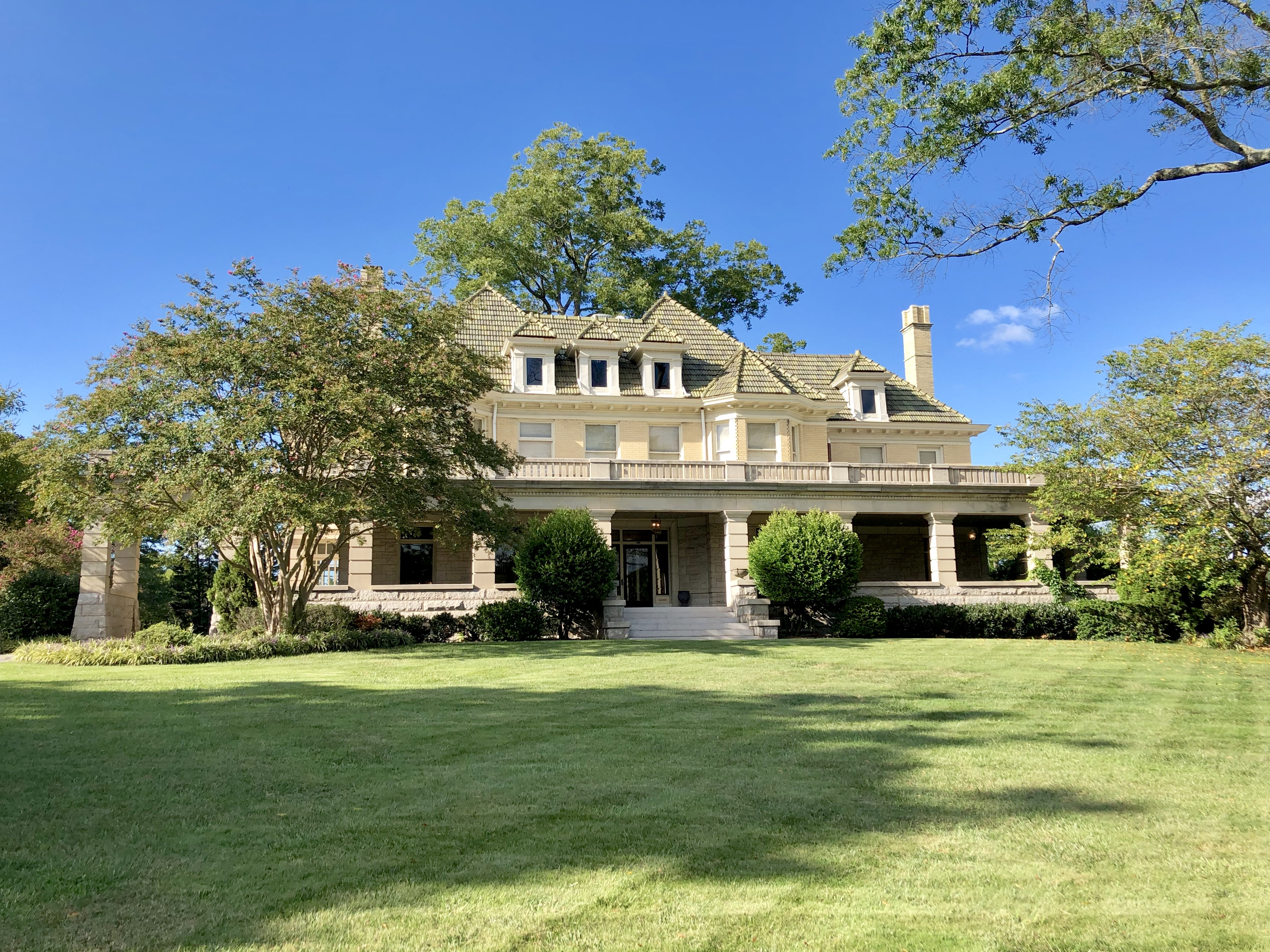
- Greystone, September 2019

- Location within North Carolina Location within the United States
- Location: 618 Morehead Ave., Durham, North Carolina
- Coordinates: 35°59′32″N 78°54′32″W
- Area: 3.1 acres (1.3 ha)
- Built: 1911
- Architect: Hook, Charles C.; Hook & Rodgers
- Architectural style: Chateauesque Revival
- NRHP reference No.: 82003449
- Added to NRHP: June 1, 1982

Greystone, also known as the James E. Stagg House, is a historic mansion located at Durham, Durham County, North Carolina. It was designed by architect Charles Christian Hook and built in 1911. It is a 2 1/2-story, six-bay, Châteauesque style granite, limestone, and brick dwelling. It features a deep porch with porte cochere, projecting bays with conical roofs, tall chimney stacks, and a high hipped roof with numerous dormers and heavy yellow-green clay tiles. The house was divided into six apartments about 1961.

It was listed on the National Register of Historic Places in 1982.
