= Belmont Historic District (Belmont, North Carolina) =

Historic district in North Carolina, United States

- U.S. National Register of Historic Places
- U.S. Historic district
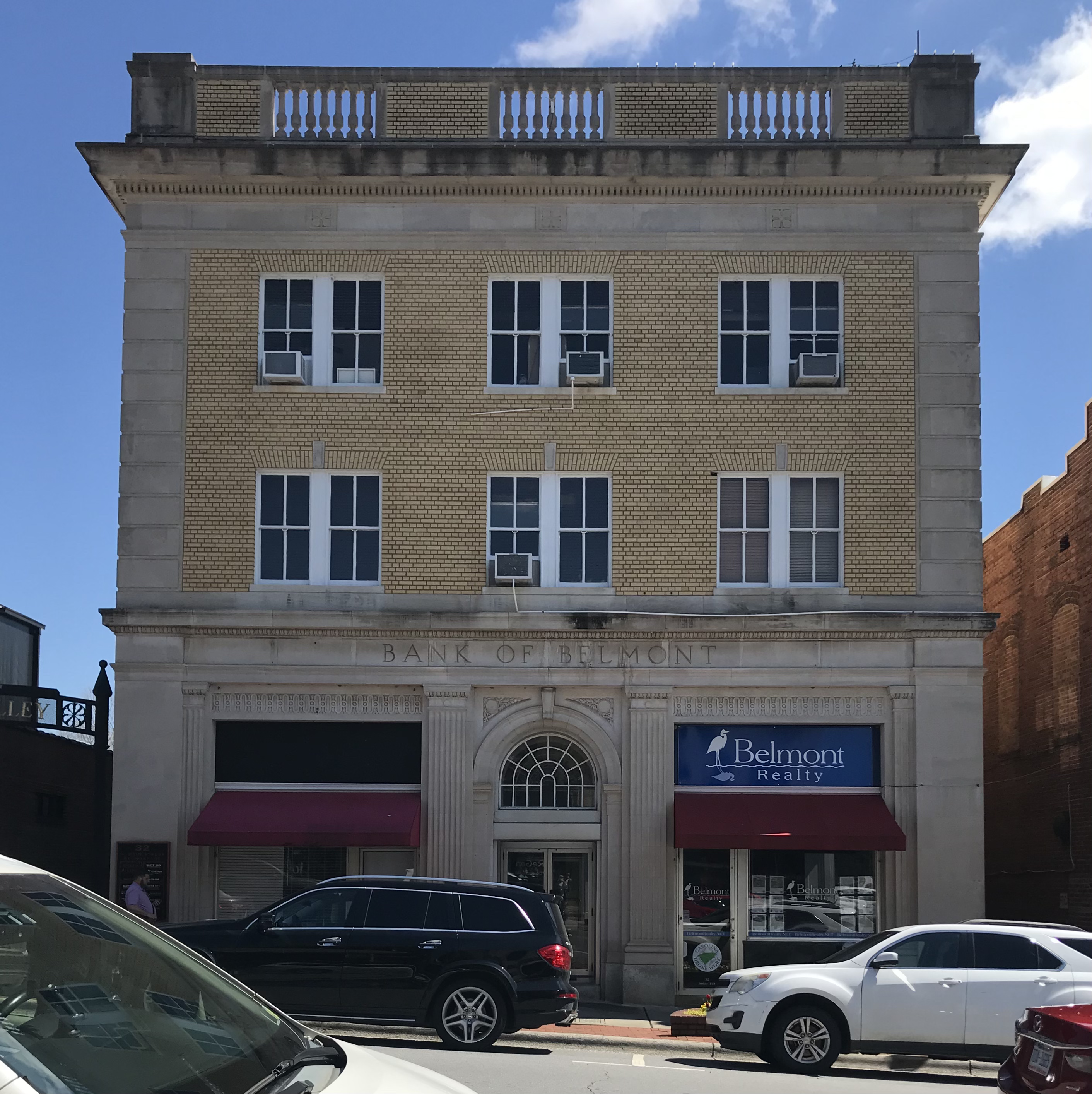
- Bank of Belmont building

- Location within North Carolina Location within the United States
- Location: Roughly bounded by Sacred Heart College campus, RR line, N. and S. Main, Glenway, Bryant Sts., Keener Blvd., Central Ave, Belmont, North Carolina
- Coordinates: 35°14′33″N 81°02′22″W
- Area: 170 acres (69 ha)
- Built: 1873
- Architects: Hook, Charles Christian; McMichael, J. M.
- Architectural style: Colonial Revival, Tudor Revival, Bungalow/craftsman
- NRHP reference No.: 96001525
- Added to NRHP: December 27, 1996

Belmont Historic District is a national historic district located at Belmont, Gaston County, North Carolina. It encompasses 264 contributing buildings, 1 contributing site, and 2 contributing structures in the central business district and adjacent residential areas of Belmont. The district was developed after 1873, and includes notable examples of Colonial Revival, Tudor Revival, and Bungalow / American Craftsman architecture. Located in the district is the separately listed U.S. Post Office, Former. Other notable buildings include the R.L. Stowe Mills Office Building, Bank of Belmont (1926), Piedmont and Northern Railroad Depot (c. 1915), Belmont Hotel (c. 1907), Abel C. Lineberger House No. 2 (c. 1919) designed by Charles Christian Hook (1870–1938), Samuel Pinckney Stowe House (c. 1919), James W. Stowe House (c. 1910), Sacred Heart College, and Belmont High School (1939).

It was listed on the National Register of Historic Places in 1996.

== Gallery ==
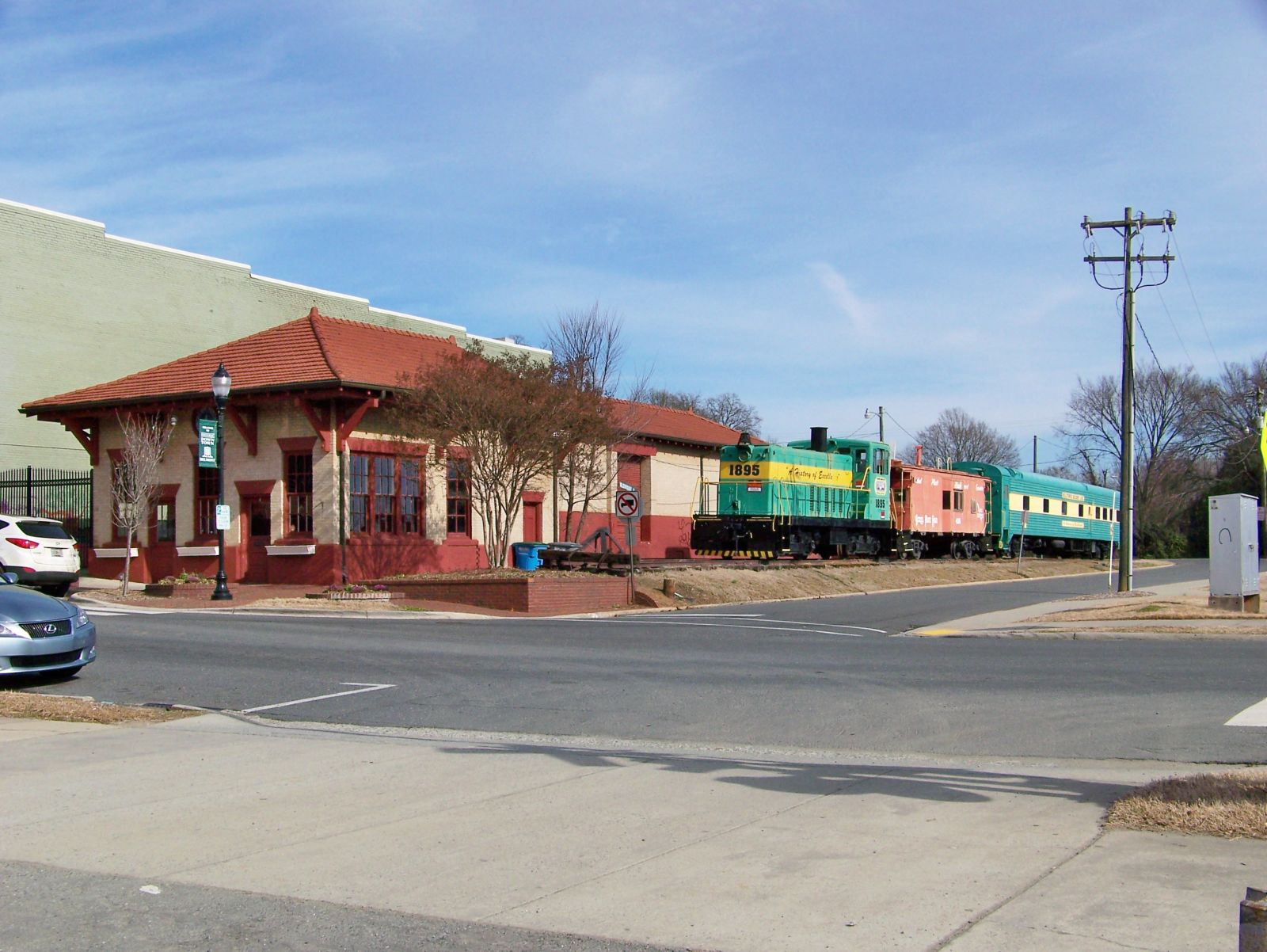
P&N Railway Station

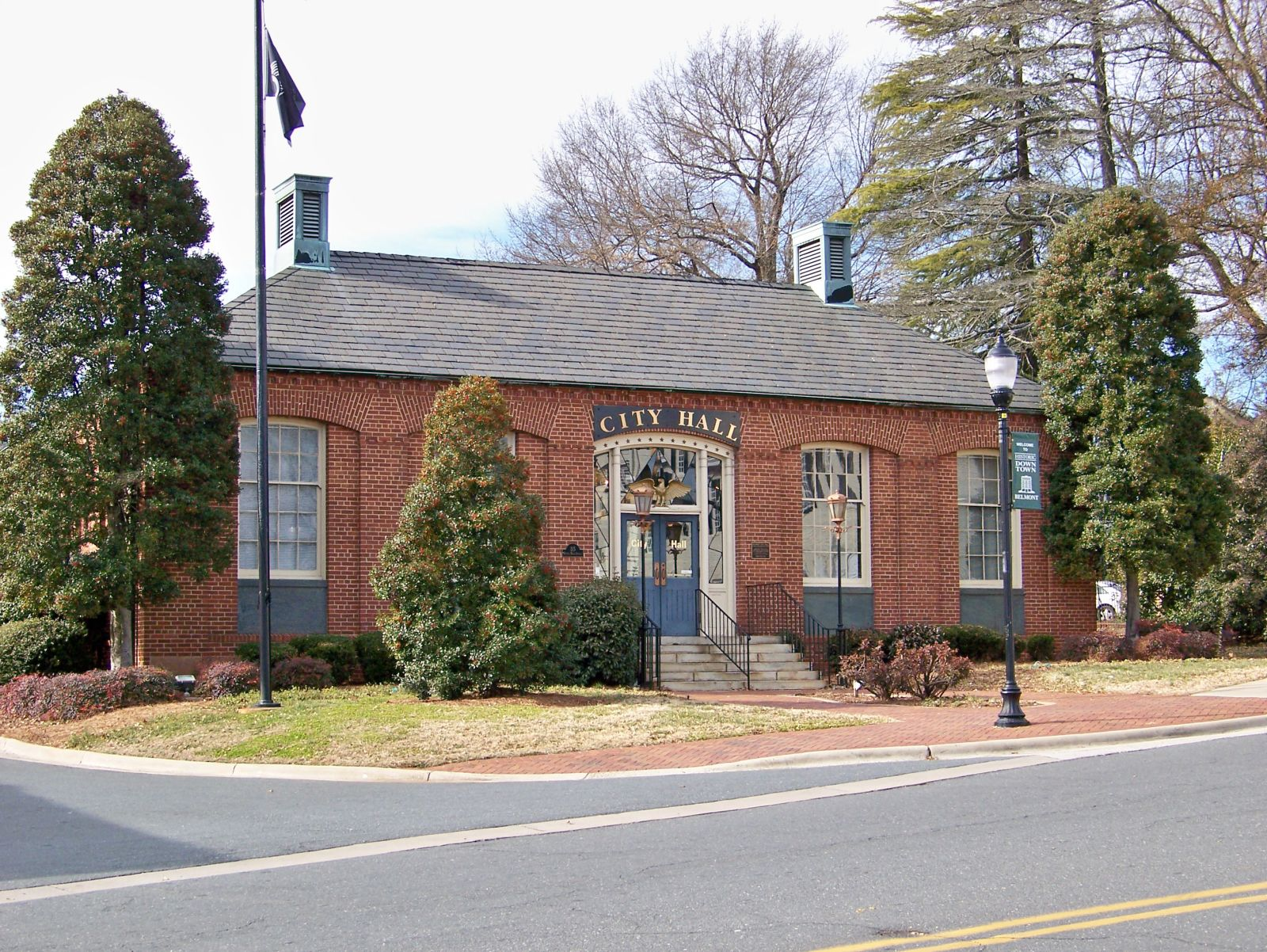
Old U.S. Post Office, now Belmont City Hall

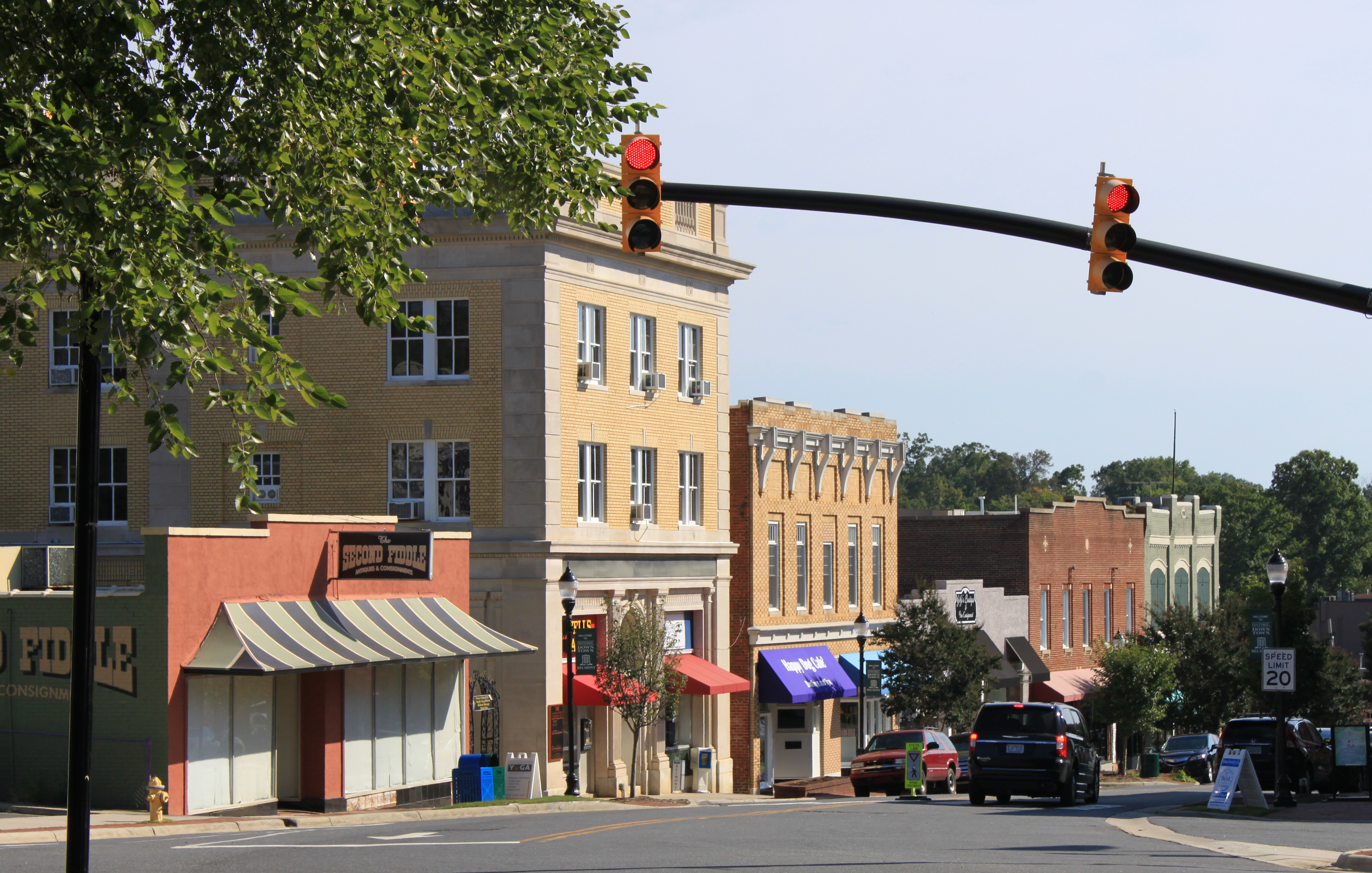
Historic Downtown Belmont (left side of street)

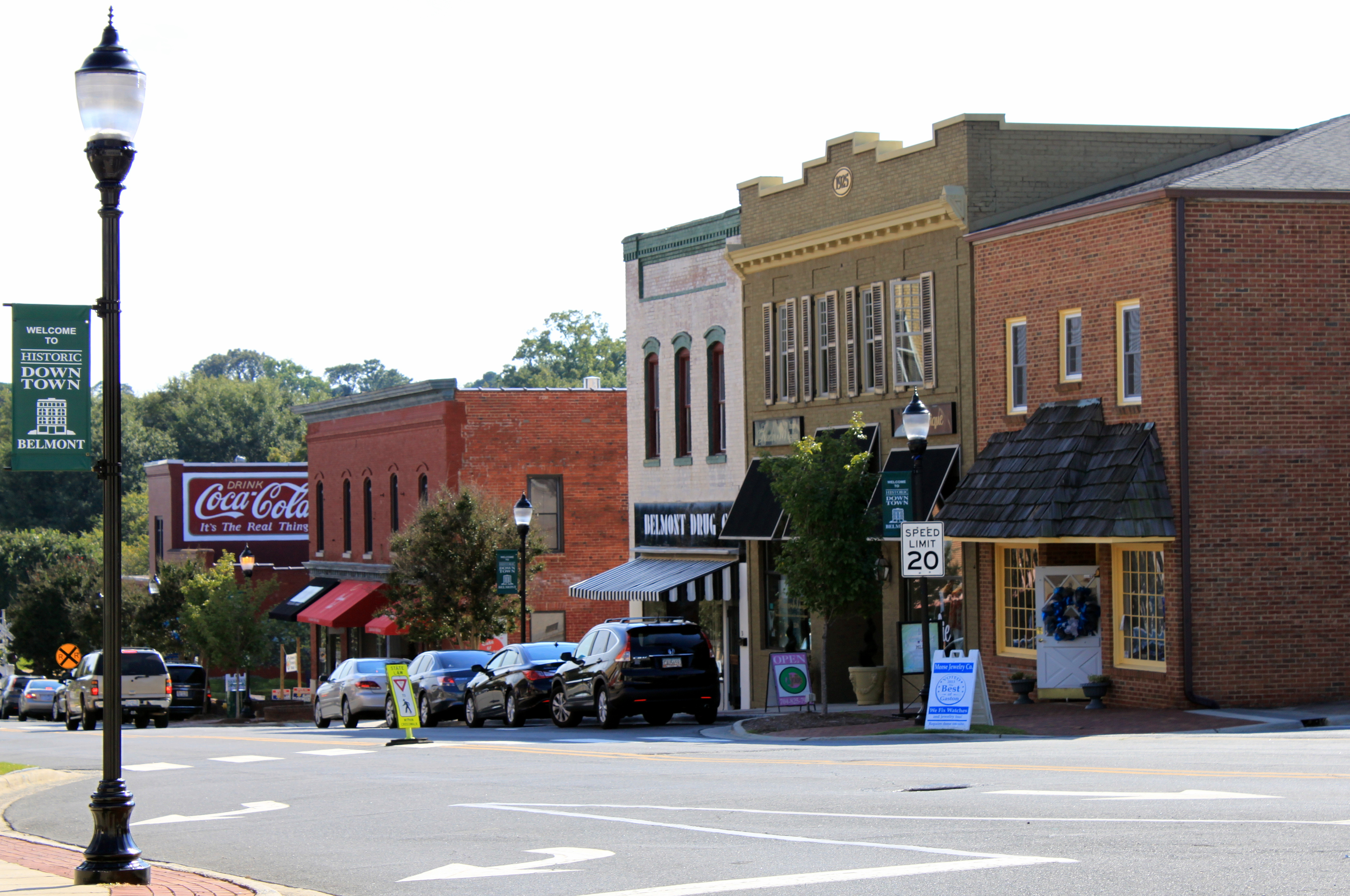
Historic Downtown Belmont (right side of street)
