= Charlotte Woman's Club =

American civic organization

The Charlotte Woman's Club (CWC) is the oldest civic organization in Charlotte, North Carolina. Charlotte Woman's club was and still is very active in the community. They established the first kindergarten in the city. During both world wars, they staffed city buses and the Southern Railway station with volunteers. They were also involved with organizing the YWCA, PTA and Traveler's Aid in Charlotte. They also brought the first public health nurses to Charlotte and helped create the League of Women Voters. The CWC also supported the creation of the Mint Museum of Art and the Domestic Relations Court.

== History ==
It was organized by six women in April 1899 as the Charlotte Mothers' Club. In 1901, twenty-five more women joined and the group was officially renamed to the Charlotte Woman's Club (CWC) with Mrs. F.C. Abbot as the first president. The club became part of the North Carolina Federation of Women's Clubs (NCFWC) in 1903. The CWC would send delegates to the annual conference for the NCFWC. Later, they joined the General Federation of Women's Clubs (GFWC) in 1908. The club also sent delegates, sometimes to conventions as far away as California. The Charlotte Club was incorporated in 1920.

By 1905 the club had 86 members and was holding meetings twice a month. By the 1920s the club's 500 members meant the club had to find a new meeting place, so the club made plans to purchase property and build a place where they could meet. Prior to purchasing their own place, they met at the Charlotte Mint. The CWC clubhouse stands on 1001 East Morehead Street and was designed by architect, Charles C. Hook. The women received the deed in 1923. It was dedicated a historic landmark in 1978 and was sold in 2008.

The club has been involved with charitable and public service work since its early days. In 1900, members of the group sent care packages to United States soldiers in the Philippine Insurrection. The CWC advocated for public children's playgrounds as early as 1910. They were also involved in citywide cleanup and beautification projects. Members of the group have been involved in education. The CWC wanted the city of Charlotte to take the lead in public education. CWC created the first kindergarten in Charlotte.

When the NCFWC was requesting in 1910 that individual clubs vote on whether or not they wanted to address the issue of women's suffrage, the CWC voted against it.

The club, while it was initially a mainly white-only organization, helped set up nursing clinics by the 1920s where both African American and European American nurses worked and were paid in part by the CWC. They had also advocated for integrated efforts to aid World War I programs. During both World War I and World War II, CWC staffed buses and train stations.
