= Avery Avenue School =

Historic school building in North Carolina, United States

- U.S. National Register of Historic Places
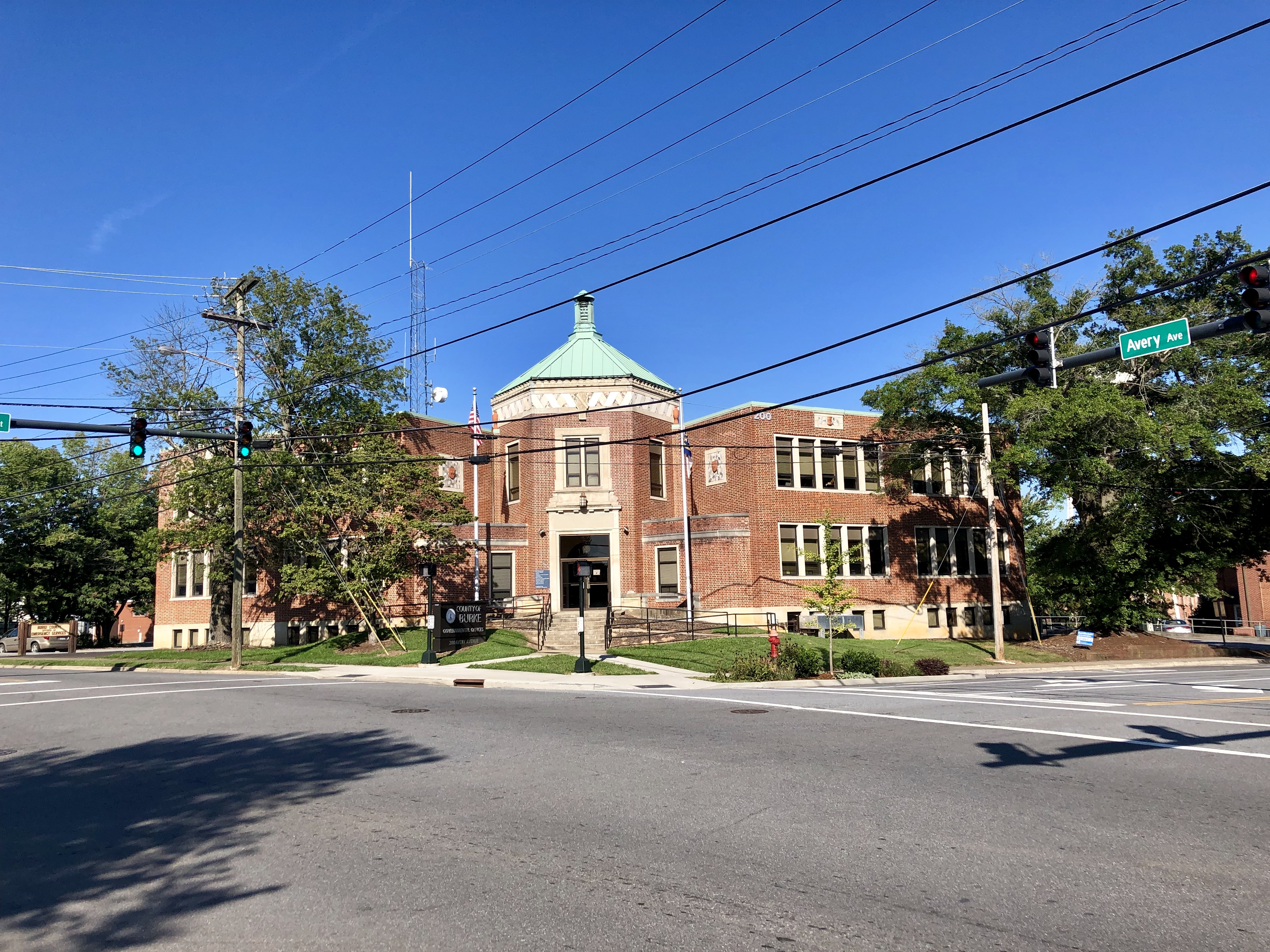
- Avery Avenue School from Bouchelle Street

- Location within North Carolina Location within the United States
- Location: 200 Avery Ave., Morganton, North Carolina
- Coordinates: 35°44′52″N 81°41′14″W
- Area: less than one acre
- Built: 1923
- Architect: Hook, Charles Christian
- MPS: Morganton MRA
- NRHP reference No.: 87001925
- Added to NRHP: November 9, 1987

Avery Avenue School, also known as Catawba Valley Legal Services, is a historic school building located at Morganton, Burke County, North Carolina. It was built in 1923, and is a two-story, brick, crescent-shaped building. It has a polygonal center section features a pyramidal roof covered in mission tile and topped by a small belfry. The building housed a school until 1957 when it was converted to offices for Burke County.

It was listed on the National Register of Historic Places in 1987.
