= Belmont, North Carolina =

- City
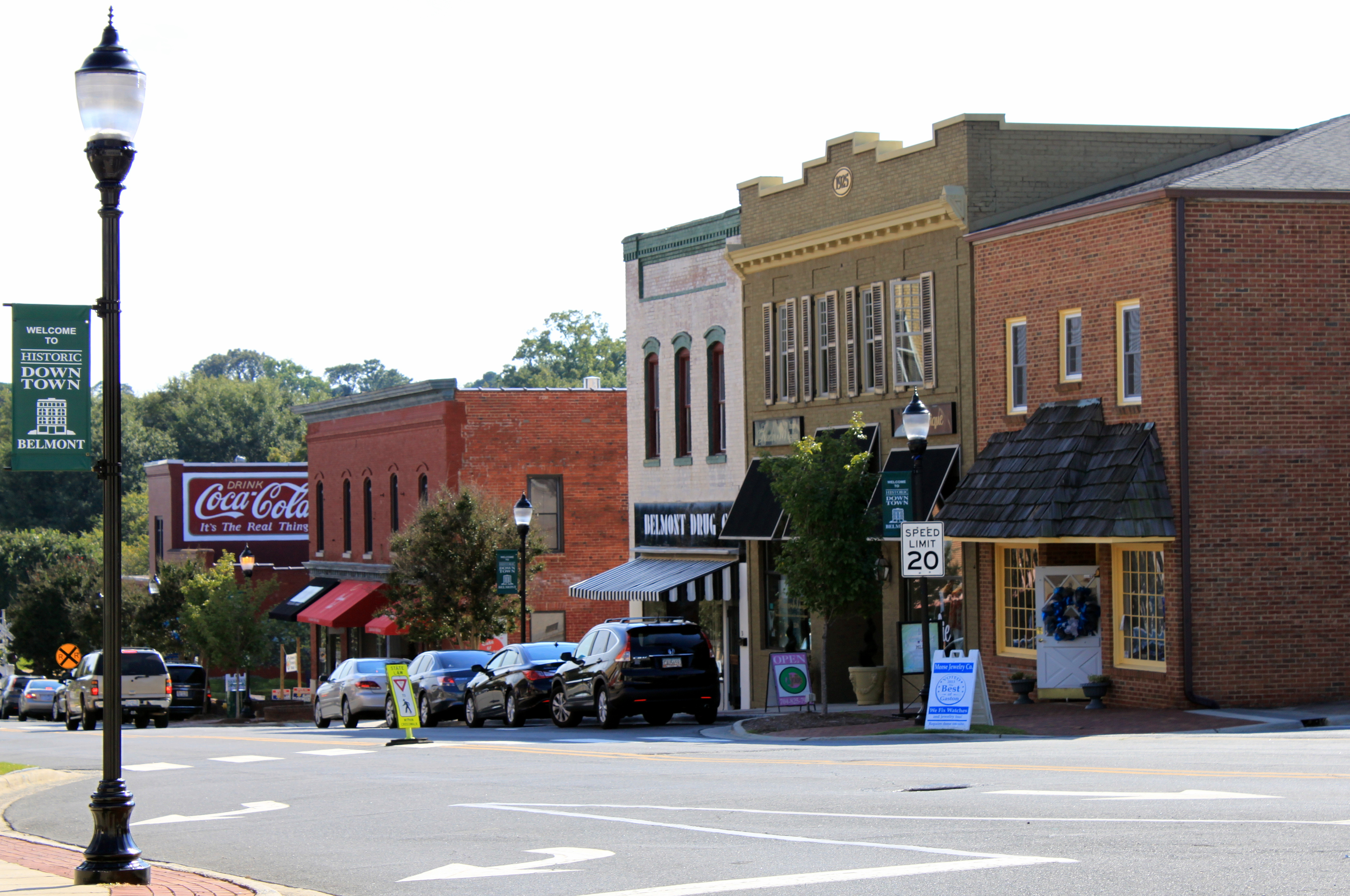
- Nickname: City of Diversified Textiles
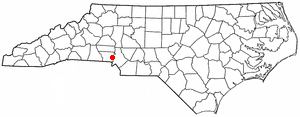
- Location in the U.S. state of North Carolina
- Coordinates: 35°13′16″N 81°02′24″W
- Country: United States
- State: North Carolina
- County: Gaston
- Incorporated: 1895

Government
  - Mayor: Joseph Jordan

Area
  - Total: 12.22 sq mi (31.66 km^{2})
  - Land: 12.19 sq mi (31.58 km^{2})
  - Water: 0.031 sq mi (0.08 km^{2}) 1.74%
- Elevation: 709 ft (216 m)

Population (2020)
  - Total: 15,010
  - Density: 1,230.8/sq mi (475.23/km^{2})
- Time zone: UTC-5 (EST)
  - Summer (DST): UTC-4 (EDT)
- ZIP code: 28012
- Area code: 704
- FIPS code: 37-04840
- GNIS feature ID: 2403850
- Website: www.cityofbelmont.org

Belmont is a small suburban city in Gaston County, North Carolina, United States, located about 9 miles (14 km) east of Gastonia. The population was 15,010 at the 2020 census. The area was once known as Garibaldi Station, namely after the railroad stop created in the early 1870s. This was named after John Garibaldi, the engineer who oversaw the construction of the railroad and construction of the first water tower in town.

Belmont is home to Belmont Abbey College.

== History ==
Settlement in the Belmont area began around the colonial-era Fort at the Point, built in the 1750s by Dutch settler James Kuykendall, Robert Leeper, and two others near the junction of the South Fork and the Catawba River. The fort was built because of ongoing hostilities with the Cherokee, but it was apparently never attacked.

The South Point Community, located about 2 1/2 miles south of present-day downtown Belmont, was the site of Stowesville Mill. Founded by Jasper Stowe and Associates in 1853, it was one of the first three cotton mills in operation in Gaston County.

Abram Stowe (1842–1897) returned to the area after serving in the Civil War. He built a Greek Revival home (still the oldest known structure in Belmont) and opened a small mercantile store. He later became postmaster and town depot agent for the new Atlanta and Richmond Air-Line Railway, which was constructed in 1871. Additional stores were soon built near the community's railroad stop, Garibaldi Station. The station was named for John Garibaldi, who had supervised construction of a water tank near the new railroad. Existing settlers in the South Point community moved north to be closer to the railroad.

In 1872, Father Jeremiah O'Connell, a Roman Catholic missionary priest, purchased a 500-acre (2.0 km^{2}) tract known as the Caldwell farm, less than one mile (1.6 km) north of Garibaldi Station. The land was then donated to the Benedictine monks of Saint Vincent's Archabbey in Latrobe, Pennsylvania, for the establishment of a religious community and school. Belmont Abbey, officially named "Mary Help of Christians Abbey", was founded in 1876 by Bishop Leo Haid, and still functions today. The abbey operates Belmont Abbey College, a liberal arts college.

In 1883, the name of Garibaldi Station was formally changed to Belmont. It was named for the New York banker August Belmont. In 1895, by an act of the North Carolina General Assembly, an area within a 1/4 mile radius from the intersection of Main Street and the railroad was incorporated as the Town of Belmont.

Belmont was still a small town at the turn of the century, with a population of only 145. The organization of Chronicle Mills in 1901 marked the beginning of Belmont's development as a textile center. It was founded by Robert Lee Stowe Sr. (1866–1963), his brother Samuel Pinckney Stowe (1868–1956), and Abel Caleb Lineberger (1859–1948, son of Caleb John Lineberger, who had founded Gaston County's first textile mill, the Woodlawn, or "Pinhook", Mill in Lowell, North Carolina in 1848). Chronicle was the first of the nearly twenty mills built in Belmont through 1930, expanding the town population to 3,793.

== Geography ==
Nestled in the southern Piedmont region of North Carolina, the town of Belmont is flanked by two rivers, the Catawba River and its right tributary, the South Fork Catawba River. Adjacent to Belmont, the rivers make up two arms of Lake Wylie and form a peninsula on which the city is situated.

Areas to the west of the center of town are part of the South Fork Catawba watershed. Eastern parts of Belmont north of the Norfolk Southern Railway belong to the Catawba Heights watershed, while those to the south are in the Paw Creek watershed. Areas of unincorporated South Point Township south of Belmont belong to the Neal Branch-Beaverdam Creek watershed.

Belmont is located 12 miles (19 km) west of Charlotte and 10 miles (16 km) east of Gastonia. According to the United States Census Bureau, the city has a total area of 12.2 square miles (31.7 km^{2}), of which 12.2 square miles (31.6 km^{2}) is land and 0.039 square miles (0.1 km^{2}), or 0.25%, is water.

== Demographics ==
Historical population
| Census | Pop. | Note | %± |
|---|---|---|---|
| 1900 | 145 | | — |
| 1910 | 1,176 | | 711.0% |
| 1920 | 2,941 | | 150.1% |
| 1930 | 4,121 | | 40.1% |
| 1940 | 4,356 | | 5.7% |
| 1950 | 5,330 | | 22.4% |
| 1960 | 5,007 | | −6.1% |
| 1970 | 5,054 | | 0.9% |
| 1980 | 4,607 | | −8.8% |
| 1990 | 8,434 | | 83.1% |
| 2000 | 8,705 | | 3.2% |
| 2010 | 10,076 | | 15.7% |
| 2020 | 15,010 | | 49.0% |
| 2025 (est.) | 16,415 | ▲ | 9.4% |
U.S. Decennial Census

=== 2020 census ===
Belmont racial composition
| Race | Number | Percentage |
|---|---|---|
| White (non-Hispanic) | 11,586 | 77.19% |
| Black or African American (non-Hispanic) | 1,459 | 9.72% |
| Native American | 50 | 0.33% |
| Asian | 515 | 3.43% |
| Pacific Islander | 13 | 0.09% |
| Other/Mixed | 643 | 4.28% |
| Hispanic or Latino | 744 | 4.96% |

As of the 2020 census, Belmont had a population of 15,010. The median age was 39.0 years. 21.4% of residents were under the age of 18 and 15.7% of residents were 65 years of age or older. For every 100 females there were 92.9 males, and for every 100 females age 18 and over there were 89.4 males age 18 and over.

93.8% of residents lived in urban areas, while 6.2% lived in rural areas.

There were 5,936 households in Belmont, of which 31.1% had children under the age of 18 living in them. Of all households, 48.9% were married-couple households, 17.7% were households with a male householder and no spouse or partner present, and 28.0% were households with a female householder and no spouse or partner present. About 30.2% of all households were made up of individuals and 12.2% had someone living alone who was 65 years of age or older. There were 2,922 families residing in the city.

There were 6,426 housing units, of which 7.6% were vacant. The homeowner vacancy rate was 2.5% and the rental vacancy rate was 6.9%.

=== 2000 census ===
As of the census of 2000, there were 8,705 people, 3,348 households, and 2,226 families residing in the city. The population density was 1,077.3 inhabitants per square mile (415.9/km^{2}). There were 3,552 housing units at an average density of 439.6 per square mile (169.7/km^{2}). The racial makeup of the city was 84.39% White, 10.07% African American, 0.26% Native American, 2.98% Asian, 0.05% Pacific Islander, 1.26% from other races, and 0.99% from two or more races. Hispanic or Latino of any race were 2.49% of the population.

There were 3,348 households, out of which 30.8% had children under the age of 18 living with them, 48.6% were married couples living together, 13.6% had a female householder with no husband present, and 33.5% were non-families. 28.8% of all households were made up of individuals, and 11.2% had someone living alone who was 65 years of age or older. The average household size was 2.40 and the average family size was 2.97.

In the city, the population was spread out, with 22.8% under the age of 18, 11.7% from 18 to 24, 31.9% from 25 to 44, 20.2% from 45 to 64, and 13.4% who were 65 years of age or older. The median age was 35 years. For every 100 females, there were 91.4 males. For every 100 females age 18 and over, there were 87.8 males.

The median income for a household in the city was $38,819, and the median income for a family was $46,765. Males had a median income of $32,388 versus $25,213 for females. The per capita income for the city was $20,065. About 6.9% of families and 9.5% of the population were below the poverty line, including 10.3% of those under age 18 and 14.1% of those age 65 or over.

== Economy ==
The textile industry was once the core of Belmont's economy, but due to most textile facilities moving overseas, Belmont's motto "The City of Diversified Textiles" is no longer relevant. The large textile facilities that once employed thousands of local workers have been torn down or converted to other uses, including housing. Most of the "mill houses" where employees lived and raised their families for generations have been torn down to make room for new housing developments, and some areas have been converted to industrial centers containing various types of businesses. The few remaining plants still in operation run at reduced capacity and employ fewer workers.

Despite the loss of the textile plants, Belmont continues to grow in population. Its proximity to the large, fast-growing city of Charlotte has made Belmont an attractive place to live for new residents moving into the Charlotte area.

R.L. Stowe Mills, Inc. has its headquarters in Belmont and operates the Helms production facility. Gastonia-based Parkdale Mills currently operates two plants (Plants No. 15 and 61) and its Fiber Research Center in Belmont.

Duke Energy operates the G. G. Allen Steam Station on Lake Wylie (the Catawba River) south of Belmont. First built in 1957, the Allen Station is a five-unit 1,140-megawatt coal-fired power plant.

== Arts and culture ==
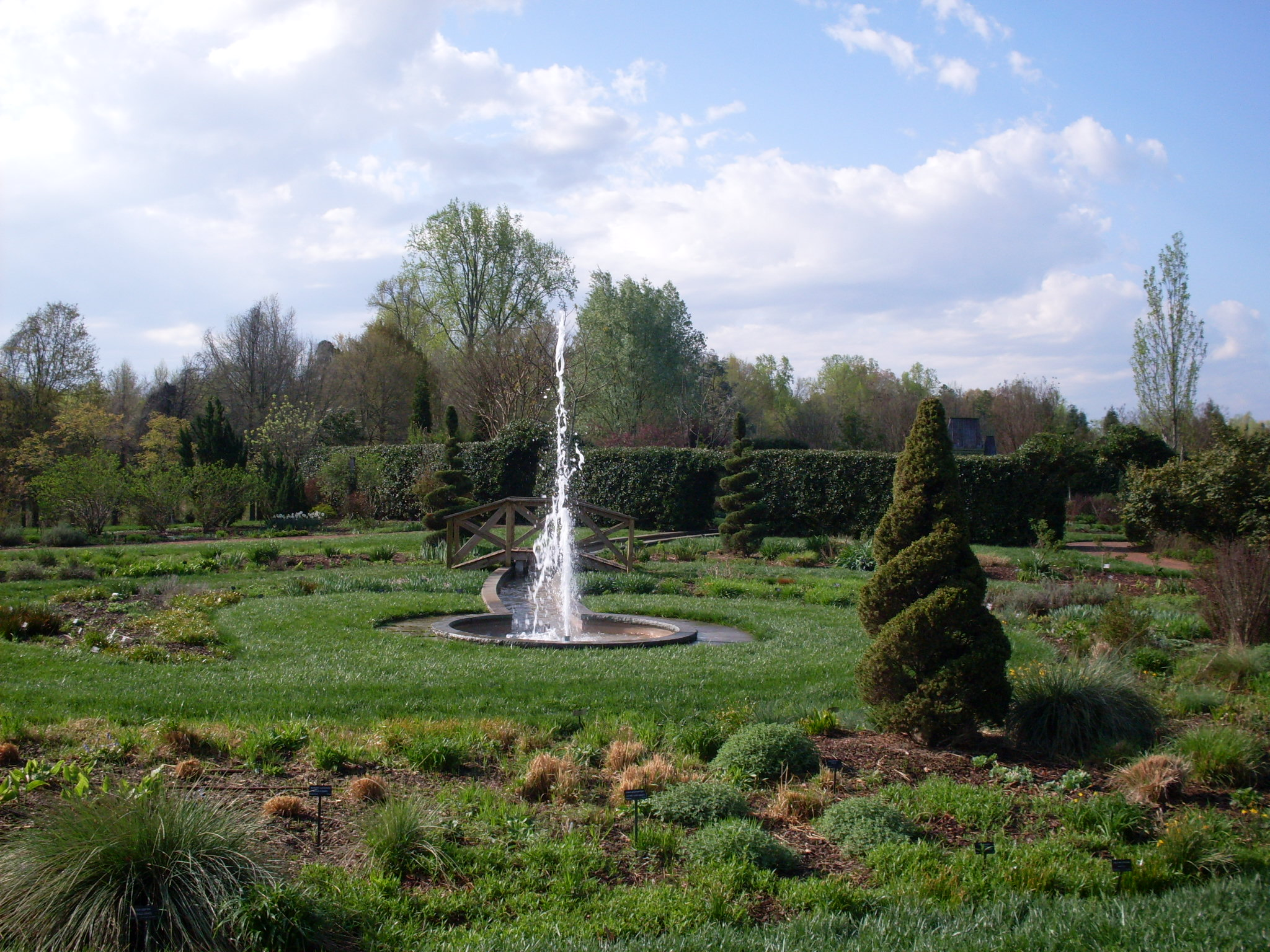
Fountain at the Daniel Stowe Conservancy

The Daniel Stowe Conservancy is a 380-acre (1.5 km^{2}) botanical garden located on New Hope Road southwest of Belmont. Daniel J. Stowe, a retired textile executive, set aside the property and established a foundation to develop the garden. The first gardens opened to the public in 1999.

The Downtown Belmont Historic District has been listed on the National Register of Historic Places since 1996. Roughly bounded by the former campus of Sacred Heart College, the Norfolk Southern Railway line, Main, Glenway, and Bryant streets, Keener Boulevard, and Central Avenue, the district covers 1,700 acres (6.9 km^{2}). It contains 264 buildings and two structures built between 1850 and 1949, including examples of Tudor Revival, Bungalow/Craftsman, and Colonial Revival architectural styles. It includes the Colonial Revival-style former US Post Office at 115 N. Main Street, now the Belmont City Hall. The Belmont Hosiery Mill at 608 S. Main Street is also listed on the National Register.

The Belmont Historic District, Belmont Hosiery Mill, and Belmont City Hall are listed on the National Register of Historic Places.

Stowe Manor, at 217 South Central Avenue, is the 1920s mansion built for textile magnate S.P. Stowe.

The campus of Belmont Abbey College has been listed on the National Register of Historic Places as an Historic District since 1973. The Abbey Basilica of Mary Help of Christians is the central feature of the campus. Built in the German Gothic Revival architectural style, the basilica was the largest Catholic church in North Carolina at the time of its construction. The monks of Belmont Abbey did much of the construction work themselves. The original art glass windows of the Basilica were designed and executed by the Royal Bavarian Establishment of Francis Mayer and Company of Munich, Germany. They were painted then heat-fused, allowing for greater detail than was possible with stained glass. The windows were part of a display that won four gold medals at the World's Columbian Exposition of 1892. The Basilica held cathedral rank from 1910 to 1977. It was elevated to the rank of a Minor Basilica on July 27, 1998.

The Belmont Historical Society Cultural and Heritage Learning Center is located in the former R.L. Stowe home at 40 Catawba Street. Built in 1899, it is believed to be the third oldest home in Belmont. The property also contains a free-standing kitchen, a mill house, and a garage. Displays include furnishings, artifacts, and pictures which tell the history of Belmont from the time of its Native American inhabitants through the textile age.

== Government ==
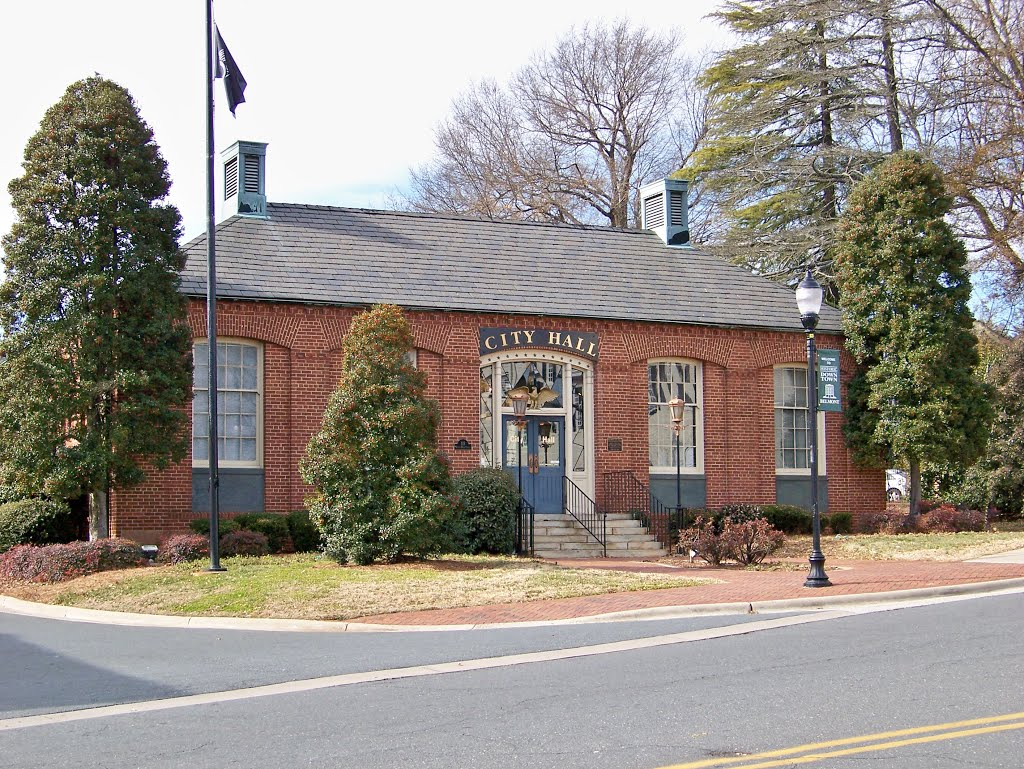
Belmont City Hall

Belmont, like the majority of cities in North Carolina, has a council-manager government, with a mayor and a five-member city council.

Belmont has its own police and fire departments which operate within the city limits. Fire protection in the unincorporated areas south of Belmont is handled by the South Point Volunteer Fire Department (2001 Southpoint Rd.), in areas southwest of Belmont by the New Hope Volunteer Fire Department (4804 S. New Hope Rd.), and in areas north of Belmont by Community VFD (1873 Perfection Ave.).

Belmont is in South Point Township.

== Education ==
Public education in Belmont is administered by the Gaston County Schools public school system. Public schools in Belmont include:

- Elementary schools
  - J.B. Page Elementary School, pre-K to grade 1
  - Belmont Central Elementary School, grades 2–5
  - North Belmont Elementary School (graduates feed into either Belmont Middle School, Stanley Middle School or Mount Holly Middle School)
  - Catawba Heights Elementary (has a Belmont mailing address, but is actually within the Mount Holly city limits - graduates feed into either Belmont or Mount Holly Middle Schools)
- Belmont Middle School - graduates feed into either South Point High School, or Stuart W. Cramer High School in western Belmont.
- Page Primary School
- South Point High School - The school receives students from Belmont, and eastern unincorporated South Point Township. In athletics, the South Point High School Red Raiders were winners of the 3-AA NCHSAA football championship in 2009, the 3-A NCHSAA football championships in 2003 and 1979, the 1971 WNCHSAA 3-A football co-championship, and the 2011 and 1981 NCHSAA baseball championships.

Private schools in Belmont include the middle school and high school programs of Gaston Christian School. The school has been renting facilities at the former campus of Sacred Heart College in Belmont since 1994. New middle school and high school facilities are currently under construction at Gaston Christian School's campus in Lowell.

The First United Methodist Day Care Center also operates Pre-K and Kindergarten programs.

The Belmont Branch of the Gaston County Public Library serves this community.

=== Colleges and universities ===
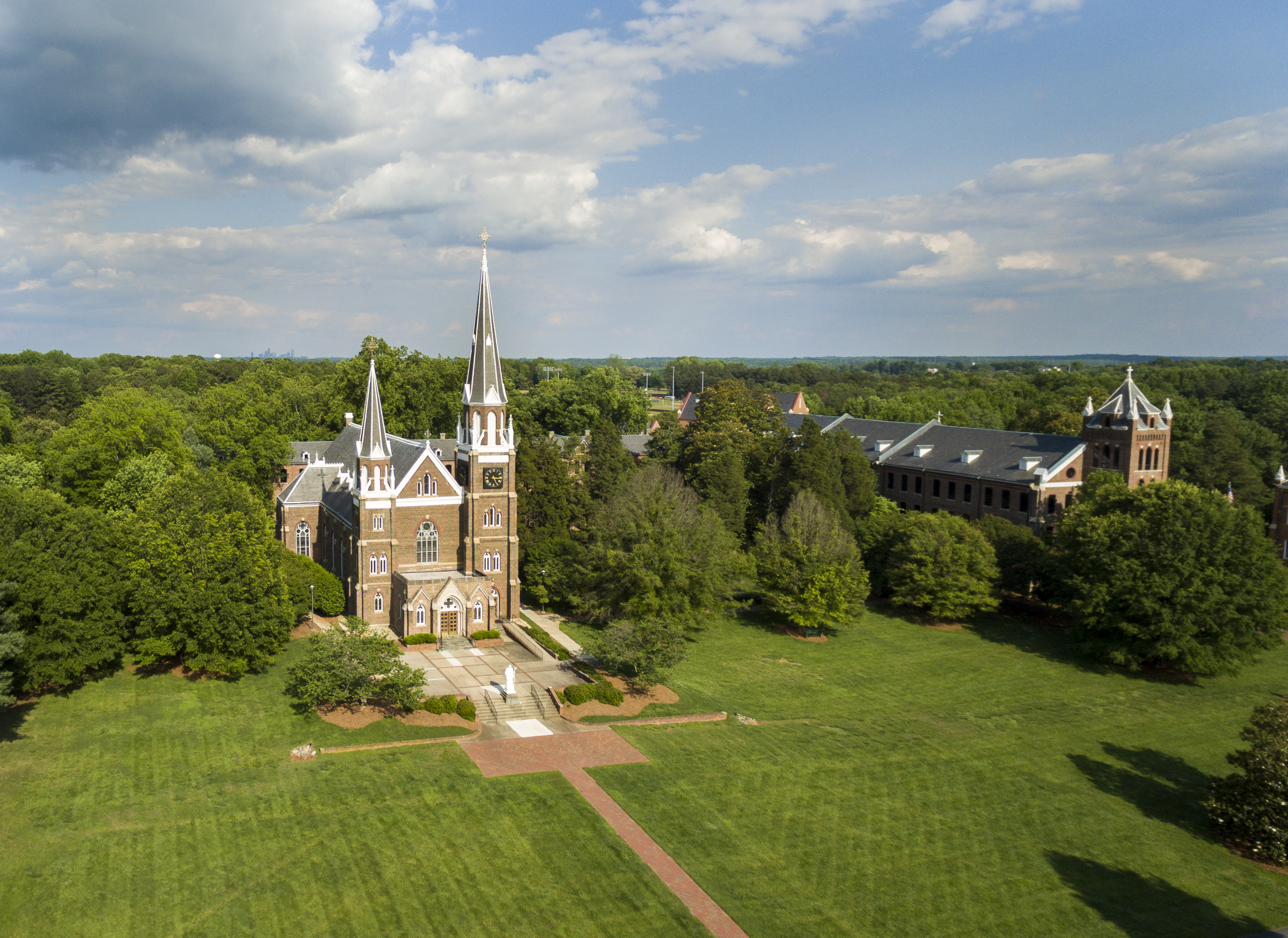
Campus of Belmont Abbey College

There are currently two colleges in Belmont. Belmont Abbey College is a private liberal arts college affiliated with the Roman Catholic Church and the Order of Saint Benedict. It was founded as St. Mary's College in 1876 by the Benedictine monks of Belmont Abbey (the name changed to Belmont Abbey College in 1913). It was a men's college until the mid-1960s when it became co-educational. With the closing of Sacred Heart College (see below), Belmont Abbey is the only college in North Carolina affiliated with the Roman Catholic Church.

Gaston College is a community college serving Gaston County. Belmont is home to one of Gaston College's three campuses, the Kimbrell (East) Campus. This campus offers continuing education and curriculum classes, a campus bookstore and branch of the Gaston College Library in Harney Hall. Harney Hall was built in 1943 and has 64,000 square feet. The Classroom Building was built in 2003 and has 28,000 square feet and houses a 200-seat auditorium. The Kimbrell Campus is also home to the Textile Technology Center at Gaston College. The Center [sic] began operations in 1943 as the North Carolina Vocational Textile School, later renamed the North Carolina Center for Applied Textile Technology. It was transferred to Gaston College in 2005. In 2010, the name was changed to the W. Duke Kimbrell Campus and Textile Technology Center in exchange for a private donation Mr. Kimbrell made to Gaston College. The Textile Technology Center offers instruction in new and sample product development, product testing, training, and consulting for the textile industry.

Sacred Heart College, a women's college affiliated with the Roman Catholic order of the Sisters of Mercy, formerly operated in Belmont. It was founded as a girls finishing school, Sacred Heart Academy, in 1892. It began offering associate degree programs in 1937 and baccalaureate degrees in 1970. After years of declining enrollment, it closed its doors in 1987. Sacred Heart's facilities are now used by Belmont Abbey College.

== Infrastructure ==
=== Transportation ===
The primary east–west highway passing through Belmont is Interstate 85. Other important east–west highways include U.S. Route 29/U.S. Route 74 (Wilkinson Blvd.) and North Carolina Highway 7 (Catawba St./N. Main St./McAdenville Rd). The primary north–south highway is North Carolina Highway 273 (Armstrong Rd./South Point Rd./Keener Blvd./Park St./Beatty Dr.).

Freight rail service is provided by the Norfolk Southern Railway. It operates the parallel Washington to Atlanta Main Line and S-Line. A spur off the S-Line carries coal to Duke Energy's Allen Steam Station south of Belmont. Amtrak's passenger train uses the Main Line, with the nearest station in Charlotte. The Gastonia station is no longer staffed by an agent but passengers can make reservations to be picked up or let off of the Amtrak Crescent trains #19 and 20 on Hancock Street in Gastonia.

Charlotte Area Transit System (CATS) is Belmont's commuter bus provider to Charlotte. The Gastonia Express (Route 85X) offers Monday-Friday bus service to/from uptown Charlotte, via the Abbey Plaza Shopping Center Station. One-way fare to/from uptown Charlotte is $2.60; transfer costs vary.

== Notable people ==
- Greene Washington Caldwell, congressional representative from North Carolina, elected as a Democrat to the Twenty-seventh Congress
- Fortune Feimster, staff writer and regular cast member of Chelsea Lately and After Lately
- Dan Goodwin, building, rock, and sports climber
- Jimmie Hall, MLB player who won the 1966 American League rookie of the year award when he played with the Minnesota Twins, was also a two-time All-Star
- Anthony Hamilton, R&B, soul, and neo-soul singer-songwriter and record producer
- Sammy Johns, was an American country singer-songwriter, best known for his million-selling 1975 hit single, "Chevy Van"
- Devon Lowery, MLB pitcher
- Nick Muse, NFL tight end
- Tanner Muse, NFL linebacker, two-time CFP national champion with Clemson
- Koren Robinson, NFL wide receiver and kick returner, drafted ninth overall by the Seattle Seahawks in 2001 NFL draft, 2005 Pro Bowl selection
- Doris Satterfield, All-American Girls Professional Baseball League player, three-time All-Star outfielder and member of two champion teams
- Jeffrey Springs, MLB pitcher
- Hal Stowe, MLB pitcher
- Humpy Wheeler, President and General Manager of NASCAR's Charlotte Motor Speedway and one of the foremost promoters of NASCAR auto racing
