= Yadkin River bridges =

The Yadkin River bridges are bridges crossing the Yadkin River between Rowan and Davidson Counties near Spencer, North Carolina in the United States. The northbound span of the Yadkin River Veterans Memorial Bridge, the first of two carrying Interstate 85 / U.S. Highway 52, opened May 5, 2012, and on August 2, 2012, southbound traffic moved to that span as well. A southbound span of the same bridge was completed in October 2012 and opened to traffic in March 2013. Each span carries four lanes of traffic.

Separated by less than 1,000 feet (300 m) were the twin spans carrying Interstate 85 / U.S. Highway 52 used from 1957 to 2012. Adjacent are two bridges carrying the Norfolk Southern Railroad, and two bridges carrying U.S. Highway 29 / U.S. Highway 70 / NC 150, one of which was closed and has been replaced.

== Interstate 85 bridges ==
The original Interstate 85 Yadkin River Bridge, twin spans completed in 1957 and closed August 2, 2012, carried four lanes of Interstate 85 (two in each direction). The bridge was not only a bottleneck for traffic moving between Charlotte and Greensboro (and between the larger metropolitan areas of Atlanta and Washington, D.C.); it was also structurally deficient and in need of replacement. In terms of cost, national importance, and imminent structural failure, it became the highest-profile construction project in North Carolina.

In the 1940s, plans began for an Interstate Highway System. North Carolina's State Highway Commission built several limited access roads using equal funding from the federal government and from the state. One planned road was the Salisbury bypass, 15 miles (24 km) long with a $1 million 880-foot (270 m) twin-span bridge over the Yadkin River. Construction on the bridge started in 1955 (this date is shown on a plaque, and most sources have used the date), but the lanes were not as wide as federal standards required, and the road had a sharp curve north of the bridge. Both of these characteristics saved money.

The Federal-Aid Highway Act of 1956 provided for 90 percent federal funding of highways that would become part of the Interstate Highway System, and the N.C. Highway Commission used the funds to build the rest of the highway, which opened as I-85 in 1958. The bridge, finished a year earlier, was "grandfathered" despite not meeting standards.

As of 1984, I-85 was relocated and widened to six lanes starting several miles north of the Yadkin River. Plans were made for widening to eight lanes around Salisbury.

As of 2001, the project to build a wider, safer replacement bridge was expected to cost $147 million, with right-of-way acquisition in the years 2003 through 2005 and construction starting by 2007 or 2008.

In 2005, the state prepared to ask for bids, but concerns about damage to a Native American cultural site delayed the project two years. With less funding available, the state considered and eventually rejected tolls.

After many more delays, the state government asked for federal funding but only received $10 million in TIGER money in 2010. At that time, the bridge carried over 70,000 vehicles every day.

The funding for the $180 million design-build project, to be completed in 2013, came from the $10 million from TIGER, $20 million from the state's Transportation Improvement Program, and GARVEE bonds to be repaid over 12 years. The DOT announced April 30 that Flatiron-Lane would build the new I-85 bridge, a replacement bridge for the U.S. 29-70 northbound traffic, bridges taking I-85 over the railroad's main line and a spur line, and redesign one interchange and remove another, in addition to widening and relocating three miles (4.8 km) of I-85, for a total cost of $136 million, $44 million less than expected. The state and federal departments of transportation approved the plan July 6.

On September 29, 2010, state and local officials held a groundbreaking ceremony on the Davidson County side of the project. Work on the project was scheduled to start the next day. By October 9, 20 acres had been cleared after approximately a week. To build the actual bridge, crews spent five months building a half-mile long, 38-foot wide temporary steel bridge for workers and equipment. This bridge remained in place from July 2011 until October 2012 and had to support as many as six 230-ton cranes at a time.

On May 11, 2011, the State House passed legislation to call the I-85 bridge the Yadkin River Veterans Memorial Bridge.

The northbound bridge's foundation was complete by December 2011, with traffic scheduled to move to that bridge by the end of March 2012. The northbound bridge opened to traffic at 1:15 A.M. May 5, 2012, and southbound traffic moved to lanes on the same bridge August 2 as the old twin spans closed. Demolition work on the old bridges was under way by February 2013 and scheduled to be finished by April.

While the target date for the southbound bridge was April 2013, it was later scheduled to open March 9.

An official dedication marking the bridge's completion and naming was held November 8, 2013.

== Wil-Cox Bridge ==
The Wil-Cox Bridge is a concrete arch bridge which carried the southbound lanes of U.S. 29 and the westbound lanes of U.S. 70 but later carried both lanes of both highways. It was completed in 1924 at a cost of $212,000, is almost 1,300 feet (400 m) long, is 20 feet (6 m) wide, and consists of seven open spandrel arch spans. The Wil-Cox Bridge, named for highway commissioners W.E. Wilkinson of Charlotte and Elwood Cox of High Point, is one of only six of its type left in the state. As of 2001, the city of Salisbury wanted to see the bridge preserved. When the U.S. 29-70 bridge is replaced, this bridge will no longer be used for traffic. Until early 2009, the state was planning to demolish the bridge, but preservationists wanted it saved as a pedestrian bridge, "a regional historical artifact" to become part of a planned greenway system. Davidson County decided to consider taking ownership and responsibility for maintenance, with the state giving the county the $2.5 million estimated cost of demolition. In March 2010, Davidson County voted to take the bridge, though one opponent pointed out that preserving the bridge would be more of a tourism advantage to Rowan County, which did not want the bridge. Tourist attractions in the area included Trading Ford and the former site of the Civil War fort Camp Yadkin.

On April 8, 2010, the N.C. DOT closed the Wil-Cox Bridge due to safety concerns. Inspectors discovered the problems in December 2008, but the closure of the bridge was expected to take place in a few years once the I-85 bridges were ready. Delays on the I-85 bridges meant these problems became serious enough to require repairs to keep the bridge in service.

On July 21, 2010, Pat Ivey of the N.C. DOT said the bridge would be used as a detour during construction, so the state would spend $1.5 million on repairs. The work was under way as of February 2011.

By April 15, 2011, upgrading on the bridge was halfway to completion. A month later, workers were using a technique called "shotcrete", using a hose to spray concrete into those spaces where damaged concrete had been removed. By July the work was expected to be complete; the bridge would be needed as a detour.

On September 1, 2011, work on Wil-Cox Bridge was complete, allowing the bridge to be used as a detour during replacement of the U.S. 29-70 bridge. The U.S. 29-70 bridge built in 1951 closed April 17, 2012, with the new bridge scheduled to open by Fall 2013. However, only cars going south could use the bridge until August, when changes were made to allow traffic to go both ways. One-way traffic had a negative effect on businesses in Spencer.

== Other bridges ==
The Norfolk Southern Railroad Yadkin River Bridges were built in 1906 and 1919 and each contain four spans of Warren deck truss.

The U.S. Highway 29 North / U.S. Highway 70 East Bridge is a steel girder bridge built in 1951 as a companion to the Wil-Cox Bridge. It was closed and replaced with a new bridge. A portion of the temporary work bridge from the neighboring I-85 project was used to build the new bridge.
