= South Carolina Highway 216 =

State highway in South Carolina, United States

South Carolina Highway 216
- Battleground Road

Route information
- Maintained by SCDOT
- Length: 1.220 mi (1.963 km)
- Existed: 1964–present

Major junctions
- South end: Kings Mountain National Military Park
- North end: NC 216 at the North Carolina state line near Grover

Location
- Country: United States
- State: South Carolina
- Counties: Cherokee

Highway system
- South Carolina State Highway System; Interstate; US; State; Scenic
← SC 215	→ SC 217

South Carolina Highway 216 (SC 216) is a 1.220-mile (1.963 km) primary state highway in the state of South Carolina. The highway travels north–south, from the Kings Mountain National Military Park to North Carolina Highway 216 (NC 216) at the North Carolina state line.

== Route description ==
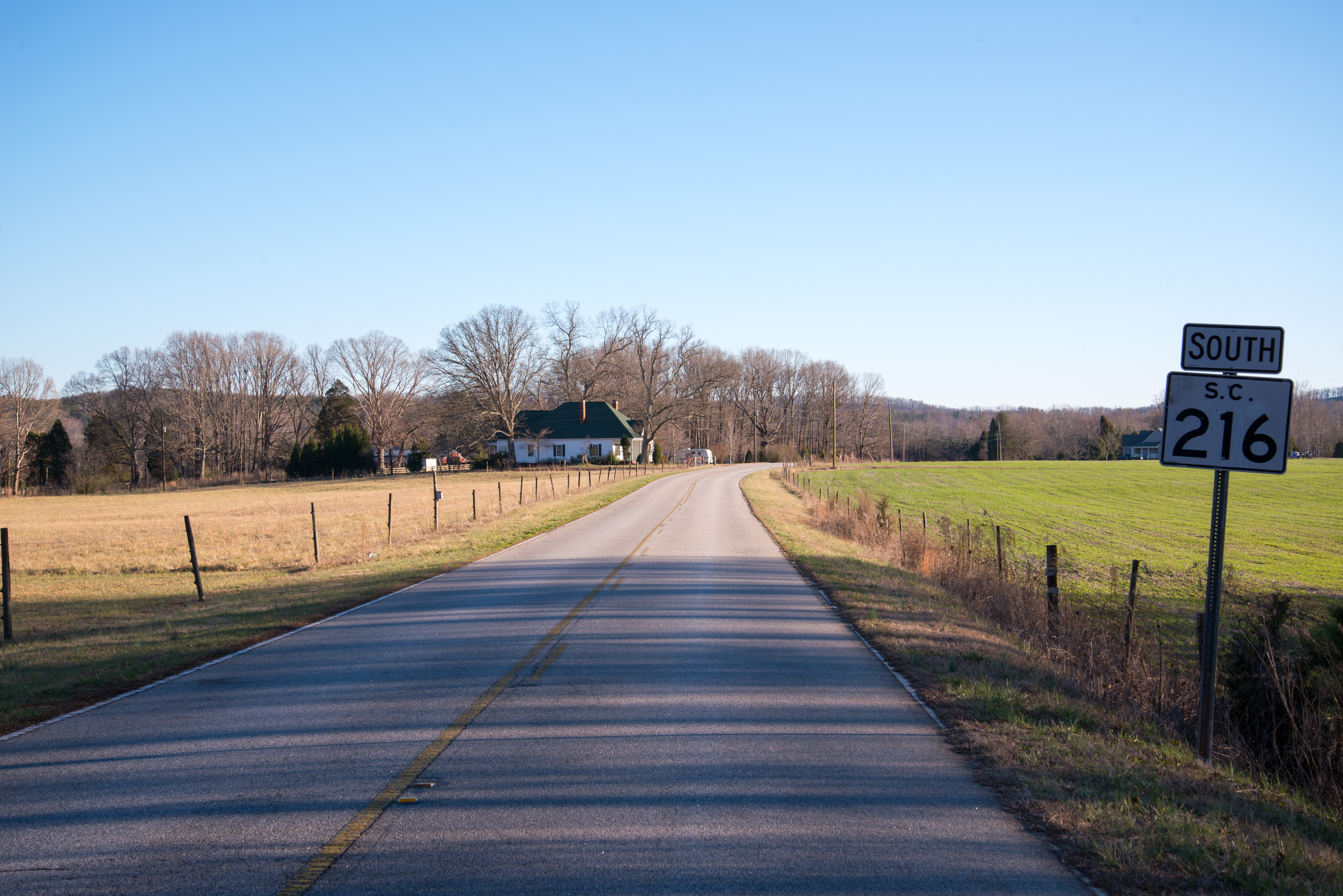
SC 216 towards Kings Mountain NMP

SC 216 is a short 1.2-mile (1.9 km) two-lane rural highway in the northeast corner of Cherokee County. At its southern terminus at the Kings Mountain National Military Park entrance, the road continues east park-maintained towards York County and SC 161. SC 216 passes through a partly forested area with some homes along the road as wells as intersecting three minor state secondary roads during its journey. At the state line, NC 216 continues north towards Interstate 85 and U.S. Route 29 (US 29) south of Kings Mountain.

== History ==
The current SC 216 was established between 1960 and 1964 as a new primary route.

The first SC 216 existed from 1939 to 1948, starting off as a one-mile (1.6 km) spur of US 21 in Sheldon. In 1940 it was extended to a loop; but after one year, half of the loop was downgraded as secondary road. By 1948, the route was decommissioned.

== Junction list ==
The entire route is in Cherokee County.

Location	mi	km	Destinations	Notes
Kings Mountain National Military Park entrance	0.000	0.000	Battleground Road	Southern terminus; Battleground Road continues past terminus.
	1.220	1.963	NC 216 north to I-85 / US 29 – Kings Mountain	Continuation into North Carolina
1.000 mi = 1.609 km; 1.000 km = 0.621 mi
