= Yadkin River Veterans Memorial Bridge =

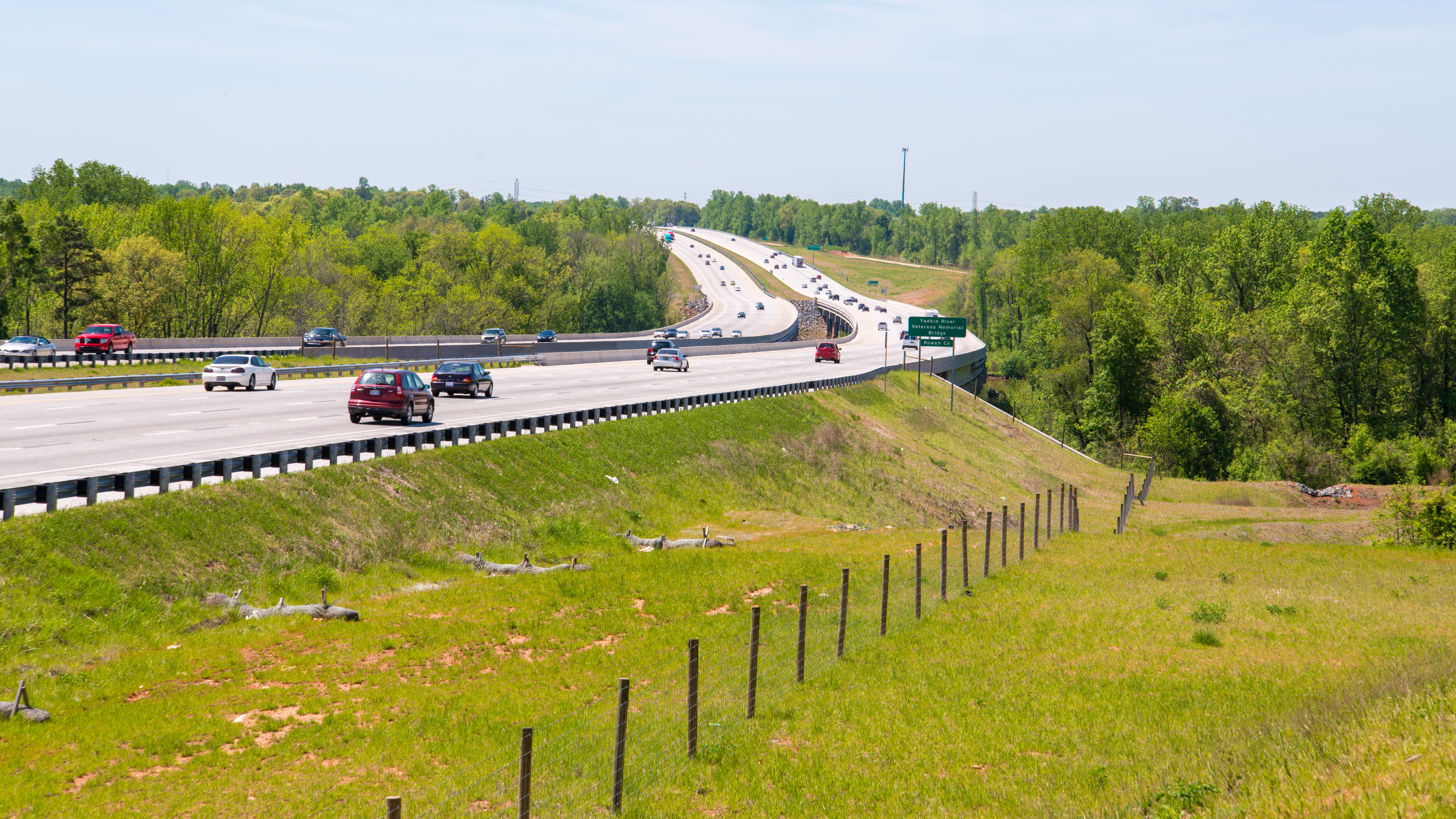
- Southbound approach to bridge
- Coordinates: 35.719444°N 80.38937°W
- Carries: 8 lanes of I-85 / US 52
- Crosses: Yadkin River and North Carolina Railroad
- Locale: Rowan and Davidson Counties
- Owner: NCDOT
- Maintained by: NCDOT

Characteristics
- Design: Segmented girder
- Material: Prestressed concrete

History
- Constructed by: Flatiron Constructors Inc. and The Lane Construction Corp.
- Construction start: September 29, 2010
- Construction end: November 8, 2013
- Construction cost: $136 million
- Opened: May 5, 2012
- Inaugurated: November 8, 2013
- Replaces: I-85 Yadkin River Bridge

Location
- Interactive map of Yadkin River Veterans; Memorial Bridge

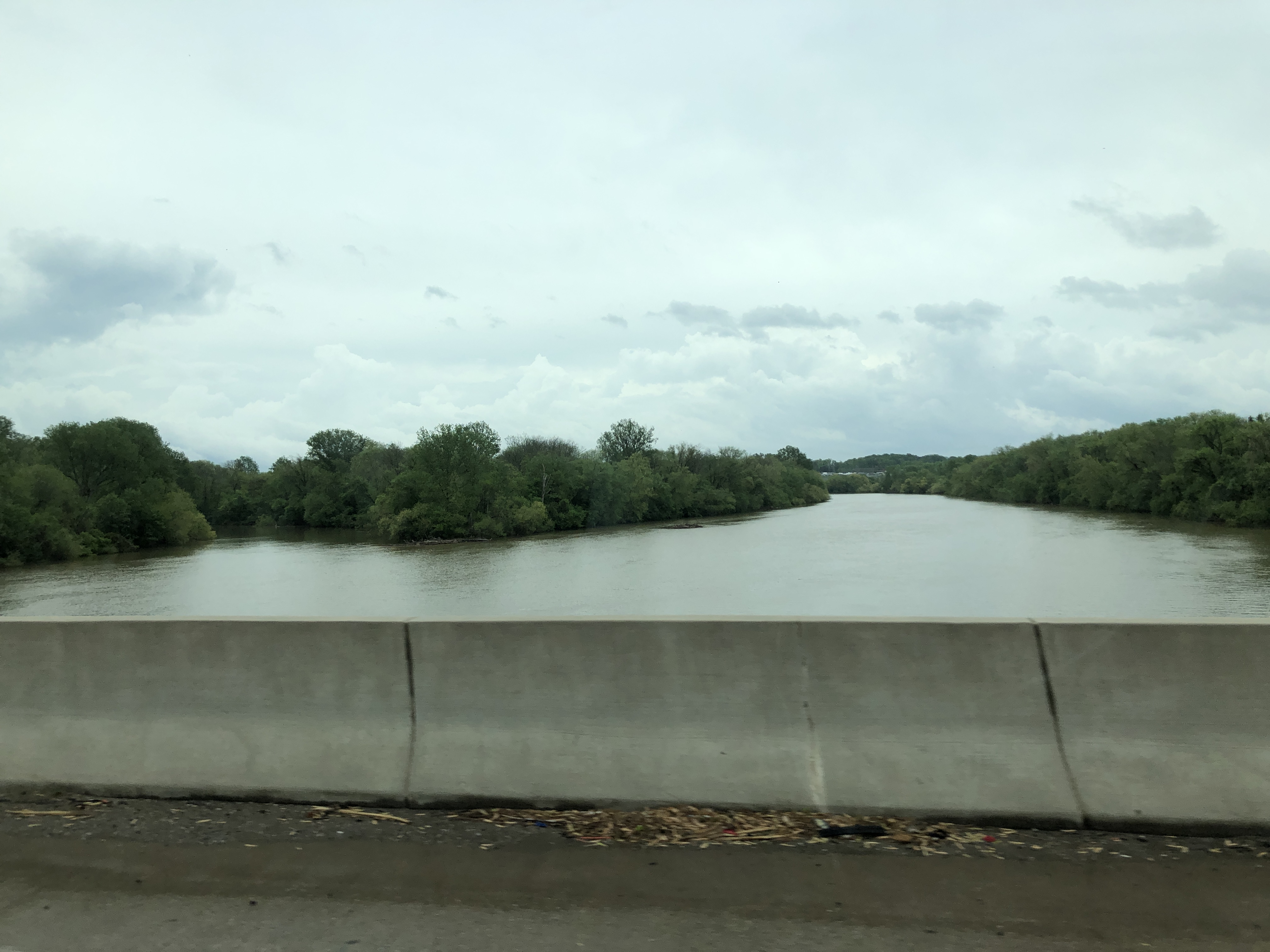
View of the Yadkin River from the bridge

The Yadkin River Veterans Memorial Bridge is a pair of bridges, each carrying four lanes of I-85/US 52 across the Yadkin River between Rowan and Davidson Counties near Spencer, North Carolina in the United States. The northbound span opened May 5, 2012, and on August 2, 2012, southbound traffic moved to that span as well. A southbound span of the same bridge was completed in October 2012 and opened to traffic in March 2013. The pair of bridges replaces twin spans that carried I-85/US 52 from 1957 to 2012, which were separated by less than 1,000 feet (300 m). Adjacent are two Warren deck trusses carrying the North Carolina Railroad and Norfolk Southern, one bridge carrying US 29/US 70/NC 150, and the historic concrete arch Wil-Cox Bridge.

== History ==
The original Interstate 85 Yadkin River Bridge, twin spans completed in 1957 and closed August 2, 2012, carried four lanes of Interstate 85 (two in each direction). The bridge was not only a bottleneck for traffic moving between Charlotte and Greensboro (and between the larger metropolitan areas of Atlanta and Washington, D.C./Baltimore); it was also structurally deficient and in need of replacement. In terms of cost, national importance, and imminent structural failure, it became the highest-profile construction project in North Carolina.

In the 1940s, plans began for an Interstate Highway System. North Carolina's State Highway Commission built several limited access roads using equal funding from the federal government and from the state. One planned road was the Salisbury bypass, 15 miles (24 km) long with a $1 million 880-foot (270 m) twin-span bridge over the Yadkin River. Construction on the bridge started in 1955 (this date is shown on a plaque, and most sources have used the date), but the lanes were not as wide as federal standards required, and the road had a sharp curve north of the bridge. Both of these characteristics saved money.

The Federal-Aid Highway Act of 1956 provided for 90 percent federal funding of highways that would become part of the Interstate Highway System, and the N.C. Highway Commission used the funds to build the rest of the highway, which opened as I-85 in 1958. The bridge, finished a year earlier, was "grandfathered" despite not meeting standards.

As of 1984, I-85 was relocated and widened to six lanes starting several miles north of the Yadkin River. Plans were made for widening to eight lanes around Salisbury.

After the September 11 attacks, the I-85 bridge was regarded as a potential target for terrorists due to its status as a vital link for the region and even the East Coast. The project to build a wider, safer replacement bridge was expected to cost $147 million, with right-of-way acquisition in the years 2003 through 2005 and construction starting by 2007 or 2008.

In 2005, the state prepared to ask for bids, but concerns about damage to the Trading Ford Native American cultural site delayed the project two years. With less funding from both the state and federal governments available, the state considered and eventually rejected tolls.

After many more delays, the state government asked for federal funding but only received $10 million in TIGER money in 2010. At that time, the bridge carried over 70,000 vehicles every day.

The funding for the $180 million design-build project, to be completed in 2013, came from the $10 million from TIGER, $20 million from the state's Transportation Improvement Program, and GARVEE bonds to be repaid over 12 years. The DOT announced April 30 that Flatiron-Lane would build the new I-85 bridge, a replacement bridge for the U.S. 29-70 northbound traffic, bridges taking I-85 over the railroad's main line and a spur line, and redesign one interchange and remove another, in addition to widening and relocating three miles of I-85, for a total cost of $136 million, $44 million less than expected. The state and federal departments of transportation approved the plan July 6.

On September 29, 2010, state and local officials held a groundbreaking ceremony on the Davidson County side of the project. Work on the project was scheduled to start the next day. By October 9, 20 acres had been cleared after approximately a week. To build the actual bridge, crews spent five months building a half-mile long, 38-foot wide temporary steel bridge for workers and equipment. This bridge remained in place from July 2011 until October 2012, had to support as many as six 230-ton cranes at a time.

On May 11, 2011, the State House passed legislation to call the I-85 bridge the Yadkin River Veterans Memorial Bridge.

The northbound bridge's foundation was complete by December 2011, with traffic scheduled to move to that bridge by the end of March 2012. The northbound bridge opened to traffic at 1:15 A.M. May 5, 2012, and southbound traffic moved to lanes on the same bridge August 2 as the old twin spans closed. Demolition work on the old bridges was under way by February 2013 and scheduled to be finished by April.

While the target date for the southbound bridge was April 2013, it was later scheduled to open March 9.

An official dedication marking the bridge's completion and naming was held November 8, 2013.
