= Fort York (disambiguation) =

Fort York is an historic site of military fortifications in Toronto, Ontario, Canada.

Fort York may also refer to:

- Fort York (provincial electoral district), former provincial electoral district in Toronto, Ontario, Canada from 1987 to 1999
- Fort York (neighbourhood), located along and south of CN and CP railway corridors in Toronto, Ontario, Canada
- Fort York Armoury, Canadian Forces facility in Toronto, Ontario, Canada
- Fort York, North Carolina, used during the American Civil War
- Fort York (HBC vessel), operated by the HBC from 1914-1930, see Hudson's Bay Company vessels
