= Gorman, North Carolina =

- Census-designated place
- Location in Durham County and the state of North Carolina
- Coordinates: 36°02′30″N 78°48′33″W
- Country: United States
- State: North Carolina
- County: Durham

Area
  - Total: 2.96 sq mi (7.66 km^{2})
  - Land: 2.90 sq mi (7.51 km^{2})
  - Water: 0.054 sq mi (0.14 km^{2})
- Elevation: 328 ft (100 m)

Population (2020)
  - Total: 1,104
  - Density: 380.5/sq mi (146.92/km^{2})
- Time zone: UTC-5 (Eastern (EST))
  - Summer (DST): UTC-4 (EDT)
- ZIP code: 27704
- Area codes: 919 and 984
- FIPS code: 37-27120
- GNIS feature ID: 2402539

Gorman is a census-designated place (CDP) in Durham County, North Carolina, United States. As of the 2020 census, Gorman had a population of 1,104.

== Geography ==
Gorman is located in east-central Durham County between the city of Durham to the southwest and Falls Lake on the Neuse River to the northeast. Interstate 85 forms the northwestern border of the community, with access from exits 180, 182, and 183. The main road through the community is East Geer Street, running roughly parallel to I-85.

According to the United States Census Bureau, the Gorman CDP has a total area of 2.93 square miles (7.60 km^{2}), of which 2.88 square miles (7.45 km^{2}) is land and 0.054 square miles (0.14 km^{2}), or 1.89%, is water.

== Demographics ==
Historical population
Census	Pop.	Note	%±
2020	1,104		—
U.S. Decennial Census

=== 2020 census ===
Gorman racial composition
Race	Number	Percentage
White (non-Hispanic)	457	41.39%
Black or African American (non-Hispanic)	112	10.14%
Asian	9	0.82%
Pacific Islander	4	0.36%
Other/Mixed	34	3.08%
Hispanic or Latino	488	44.2%

As of the 2020 United States census, there were 1,104 people, 311 households, and 246 families residing in the CDP.

=== 2000 census ===
As of the census of 2000, there were 1002 people, 406 households, and 291 families residing in the CDP. The population density was 325.1 inhabitants per square mile (125.5/km^{2}). There were 428 housing units at an average density of 138.9 per square mile (53.6/km^{2}). The racial makeup of the CDP was 82.04% White, 15.97% African American, 0.10% Native American, 0.10% Asian, 1.00% from other races, and 0.80% from two or more races. Hispanic or Latino of any race were 4.29% of the population.

There were 406 households, out of which 27.6% had children under the age of 18 living with them, 55.7% were married couples living together, 13.5% had a female householder with no husband present, and 28.3% were non-families. 24.4% of all households were made up of individuals, and 8.1% had someone living alone who was 65 years of age or older. The average household size was 2.47 and the average family size was 2.91.

In the CDP, the population was spread out, with 22.1% under the age of 18, 6.8% from 18 to 24, 30.2% from 25 to 44, 26.7% from 45 to 64, and 14.2% who were 65 years of age or older. The median age was 39 years. For every 100 females, there were 93.8 males. For every 100 females age 18 and over, there were 88.2 males.

The median income for a household in the CDP was $42,236, and the median income for a family was $43,977. Males had a median income of $36,143 versus $30,789 for females. The per capita income for the CDP was $19,083. About 9.3% of families and 6.7% of the population were below the poverty line, including 6.9% of those under age 18 and 5.9% of those age 65 or over.
