= North Carolina Highway 216 =

State highway in North Carolina, US

North Carolina Highway 216

Route information
- Maintained by NCDOT
- Length: 15.6 mi (25.1 km)
- Existed: 1930–present

Major junctions
- South end: SC 216 at the South Carolina state line near Grover
- I-85 near Grover
- North end: NC 274 near Tryon

Location
- Country: United States
- State: North Carolina
- Counties: Cleveland, Gaston

Highway system
- North Carolina Highway System; Interstate; US; State; Scenic
← NC 215	→ NC 217

North Carolina Highway 216 (NC 216) is a primary state highway in the U.S. state of North Carolina. The highway runs north–south, from the South Carolina state line to NC 274 near the unincorporated community of Tryon.

== Route description ==
NC 216 is a 15.6-mile (25.1 km) two-lane rural highway that begins at the South Carolina state line, 1.2-mile (1.9 km) from Kings Mountain National Military Park; the road continues south towards the park as South Carolina Highway 216 (SC 216). Going north, it crosses over Interstate 85 then has a short overlap with U.S. Route 29 (US 29). It enters the city of Kings Mountain on Battleground Avenue. Through Kings Mountain, it crosses US 74 continuing north on Piedmont Avenue. The road then becomes County Line Road, as the highway straddles the county line between Cleveland and Gaston counties. The highway ends at NC 274.

== History ==
NC 216 was established in 1930 as a new primary route from US 29/NC 205 to the South Carolina state line. Around 1956, NC 216 was extended north along US 29 for 1.5-mile (2.4 km), then replacing US 29 into Kings Mountain. It then continued north on several upgraded secondary roads to its current terminus on NC 274. In the early 1960s, SC 216 was established as a continuation of NC 216 to Kings Mountain National Military Park.

== Junction list ==
County	Location	mi	km	Destinations	Notes
Cleveland		0.0	0.0	SC 216 south	Continuation into South Carolina
Cleveland		0.8– 1.0	1.3– 1.6	I-85 – Gastonia, Gaffney	Exit 2 (I-85)
Cleveland		1.2	1.9	US 29 south	South end of US 29 overlap
Cleveland	Archdale	2.5	4.0	US 29 north to I-85 – Gastonia, Charlotte	North end of US 29 overlap
Cleveland	Kings Mountain	7.1	11.4	US 74 Bus. (Kings Street) to I-85	
Cleveland	Kings Mountain	7.8– 8.0	12.6– 12.9	US 74 – Shelby, Gastonia	Interchange
Gaston		15.6	25.1	NC 274 – Cherryville, Bessemer City	Northern terminus
1.000 mi = 1.609 km; 1.000 km = 0.621 mi: Concurrency terminus
