= Interstate 85 in North Carolina =

Section of Interstate Highway in North Carolina, United States

Interstate 85
- I-85 highlighted in red

Route information
- Maintained by NCDOT
- Length: 231.23 mi (372.13 km)
- Existed: August 14, 1957–present
- History: Completed January 13, 1972
- NHS: Entire route

Major junctions
- South end: I-85 at the South Carolina state line in Grover
- I-485 in Charlotte (twice); I-77 / US 21 in Charlotte; I-285 / US 29 / US 52 / US 70 near Lexington; I-74 near Archdale; I-73 / US 421 in Greensboro; I-40 / I-785 / I-840 near Greensboro; I-40 in Hillsborough; US 15 / US 501 in Durham; I-885 / US 70 in Durham; US 1 / US 158 in Henderson
- North end: I-85 at the Virginia line near Bracey, VA

Location
- Country: United States
- State: North Carolina
- Counties: Cleveland, Gaston, Mecklenburg, Cabarrus, Rowan, Davidson, Randolph, Guilford, Alamance, Orange, Durham, Granville, Vance, Warren

Highway system
- Interstate Highway System; Main; Auxiliary; Suffixed; Business; Future; North Carolina Highway System; Interstate; US; State; Scenic
← NC 84	→ NC 86

Interstate 85 (I-85) is a part of the Interstate Highway System that runs 666.05 miles (1,071.90 km) from Montgomery, Alabama, to Petersburg, Virginia. In the U.S. state of North Carolina, I-85 crosses the entire state from southwest to northeast (though is signed north–south), at the South Carolina state line near Grover to the Virginia state line near Wise. Running for over 231.23 miles (372.13 km), the segment of I-85 is the longest of the five states it passes through and the second-longest Interstate Highway in North Carolina after I-40.

From southwest to northeast, I-85 crosses the large Piedmont region through its course in the state. Within this region, the Interstate connects three of the state's four most populous cities, Charlotte, Greensboro, and Durham. I-85 also serves to connect several smaller communities and suburban cities, such as Gastonia, Salisbury, High Point, and Henderson. Landscapes along the route include rolling hills and gently sloping terrain of the Appalachian Mountains at its southernmost stretch, the urbanized neighborhoods of the Piedmont cities through the center of North Carolina, and flat farmlands in the northeast towards Virginia.

Along its route, the Interstate parallels several older U.S. Routes for its entire length. It follows US 29 from South Carolina to Greensboro, US 70 from Greensboro to Durham, US 15 from Durham to Oxford, and US 1 from Henderson to Virginia. It shares an extensive concurrency with I-40 from Greensboro to Hillsborough, and has four auxiliary routes: I-285, I-485, I-785, and I-885. The first segment of I-85 to be complete was an 11.3-mile (18.2 km) segment through Mecklenburg County, opened in 1958. Later segments were eventually completed through bonds, contracts, and extensions, with the final segment opening in 1972. Since then, most of the route has been widened and renovated to accommodate rapid growth within the region.

== Route description ==
I-85 is maintained by the North Carolina Department of Transportation (NCDOT) for its entire length in the state and designated as a Blue Star Memorial Highway. The Interstate carries an average annual daily traffic volume of approximately 65,000 vehicles a day; roughly 25–40% of that traffic is commercial vehicles. In 2023, the busiest stretch along the Interstate was from the Statesville Avenue interchange to Graham Street in Charlotte, which carried a total of 200,529 vehicles per day. The lowest number was 20,224 vehicles per day at the US 1 interchange near Henderson and Middleburg. I-85 for most of its length in the state is generally a four to eight-lane configuration, with the exception of Durham, where it widens to ten lanes briefly. All of I-85 is a part of the National Highway System, a network of roads important for the country's economy, defense, and mobility.

=== South Carolina to Charlotte ===
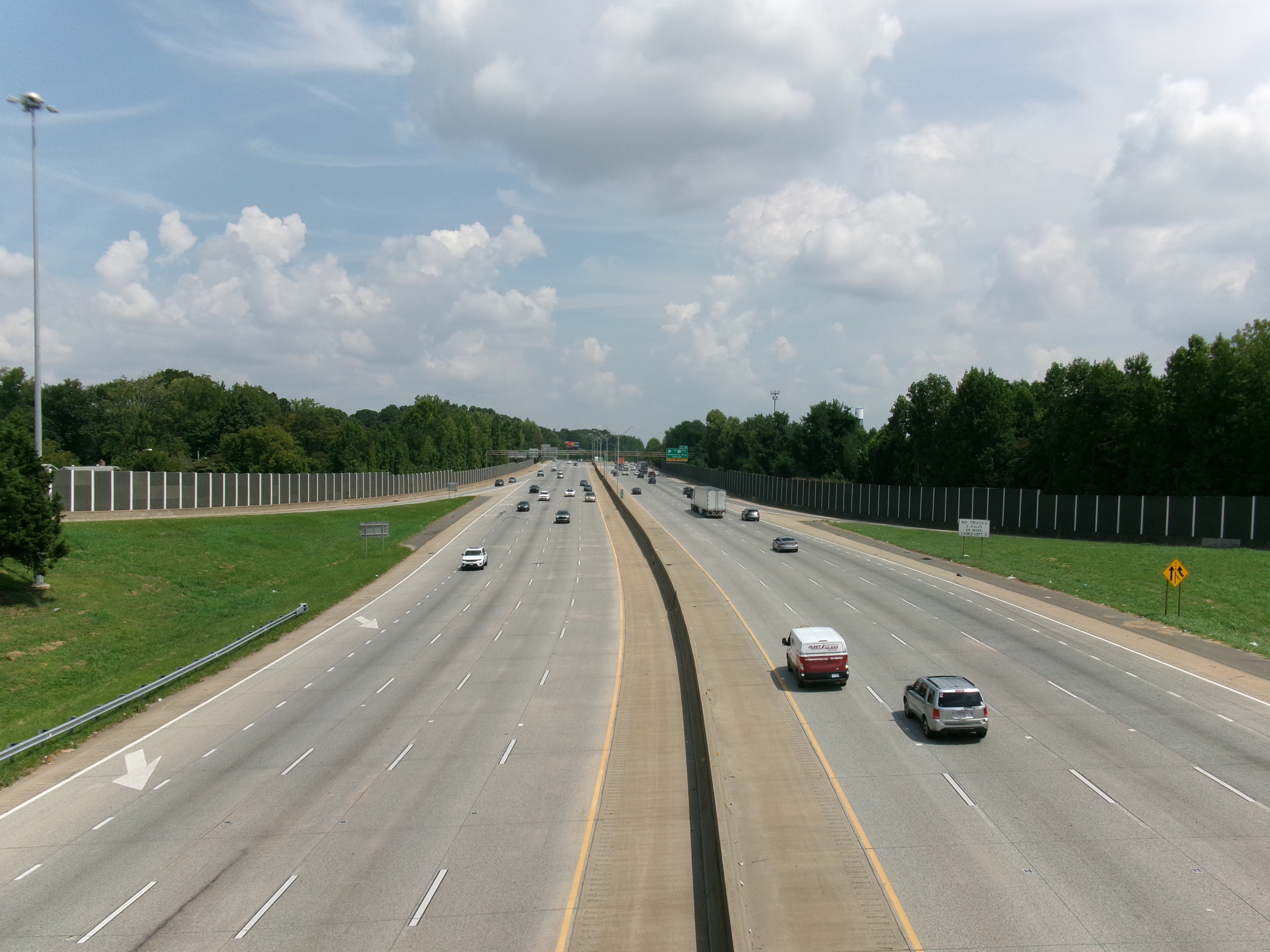
I-85 northbound past the Glenwood Drive exit in Charlotte

I-85 enters Cleveland County, North Carolina from Cherokee County, South Carolina, in the town limits of Grover. Most of the Interstate for its first few miles passes into gently rolling terrain and is primarily rural in nature. The interstate comes to the interchange with NC 216, which gives access to Kings Mountain National Military Park, with the welcome center shortly after. Later, the southbound lanes have an exit for US 29, which merges onto I-85 and begins a concurrency. At mile marker 10, the Interstate meets US 74 at a weave interchange and US 29 splits off from I-85 for US 74 east.

At this point, I-85 crosses into Gaston County. It enters suburban areas and traffic begins increasing from here. The Interstate reaches the city limits of Gastonia and has an exit for NC 274 (Bessemer City Road). Then it has a major interchange with US 321, signed north for Lincolnton and south for the city's main business district. Past it, I-85 turns southeast, then east as it goes through more suburban and residential areas of the city. Along here, it intersects more state highways serving as Gastonia's main thoroughfares, including NC 7 (Ozark Avenue), NC 279 (New Hope Road), and NC 7 (McAdenville Road/Main Street) again; NC 7 provides access to the town of McAdenville. Just east of McAdenville, I-85 crosses the South Fork Catawba River on the William James Pharr Bridge. From here, the Interstate passes through considerably high residential development as it continues on its eastward track to Belmont. The Interstate then has an exit for Belmont at Main Street and passes right off the campus of Belmont Abbey College as it reaches another interchange for Belmont with NC 273 (Beatty Drive) one mile later, then crosses the Catawba River on the Cameron Morrison Bridge, entering Mecklenburg County.

=== Charlotte to Greensboro ===
The interstate enters into Mecklenburg County, where it comes to the nearby weigh station, which occasionally serves trucks in both directions. I-85 traverses near the station building for Fox affiliate WJZY. I-85 comes to I-485, the beltway around Charlotte, with the stack interchange. This stretch of I-85 is frequently congested, in result of the ramps from I-485 inbound merging into one on southbound I-85. The interstate subsequently comes to the exit for the Charlotte Douglas International Airport via Little Rock Road at a single-point urban interchange (SPUI) and enters into Charlotte. Inside the city, the interstate comes to the interchange with Billy Graham Parkway, alongside two more single-point urban interchanges with NC 27 (Freedom Drive) and NC 16 (Brookshire Boulevard).

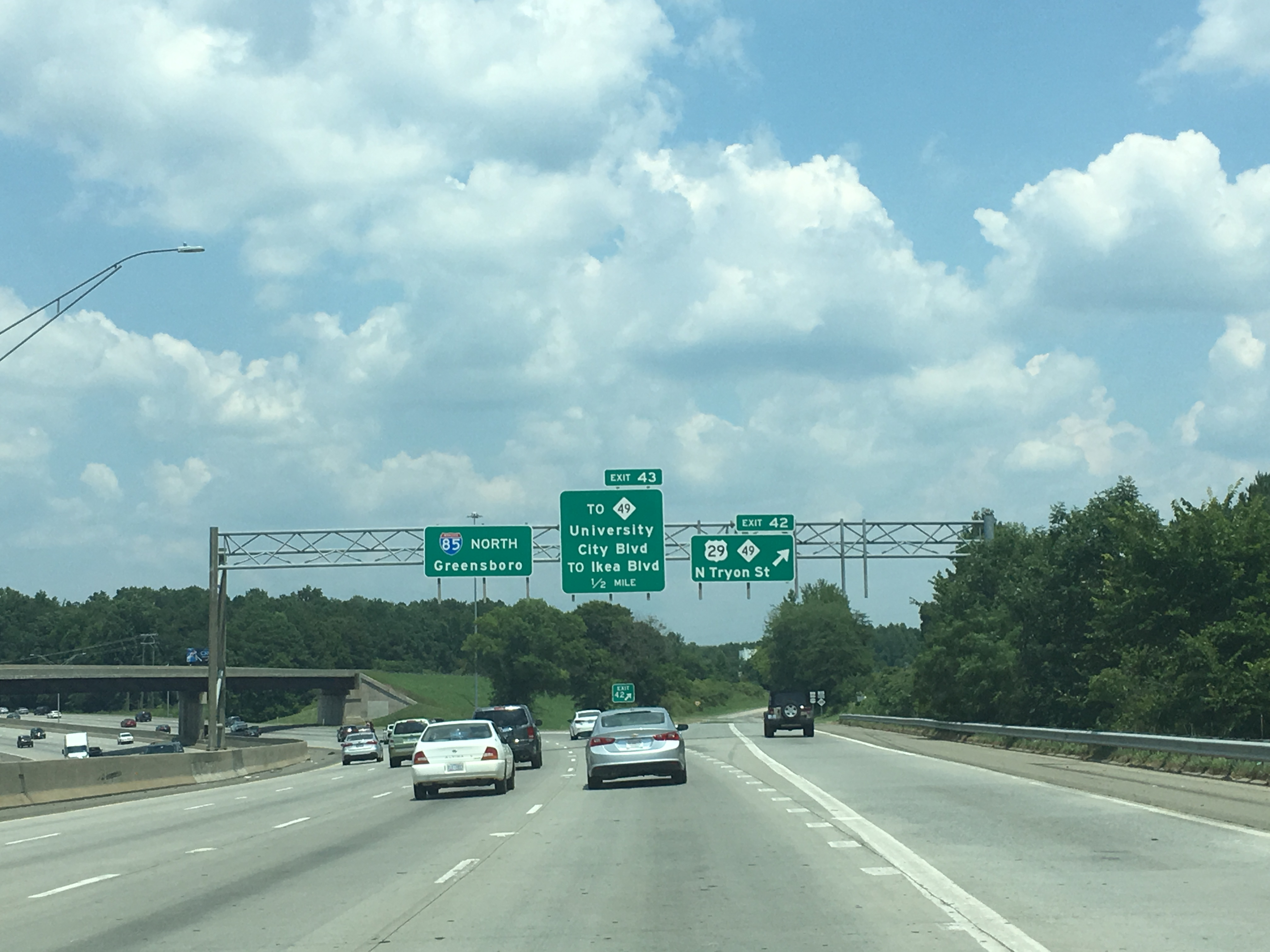
I-85 northbound at the exit for US 29/NC 49 in Charlotte

I-85 comes to the interchange with I-77 and US 21 with a hybrid interchange containing several flyover ramps. I-85 traverses the northern outskirts of Uptown, before coming to the exits with Graham Street, Sugar Creek Road, and North Tryon Street. It is in this vicinity, where I-85 continues northward and enters into the University City district. I-85 comes to the junction with NC 24 (Harris Boulevard) in this stretch, crosses Mallard Creek, and comes to the turbine interchange with I-485.

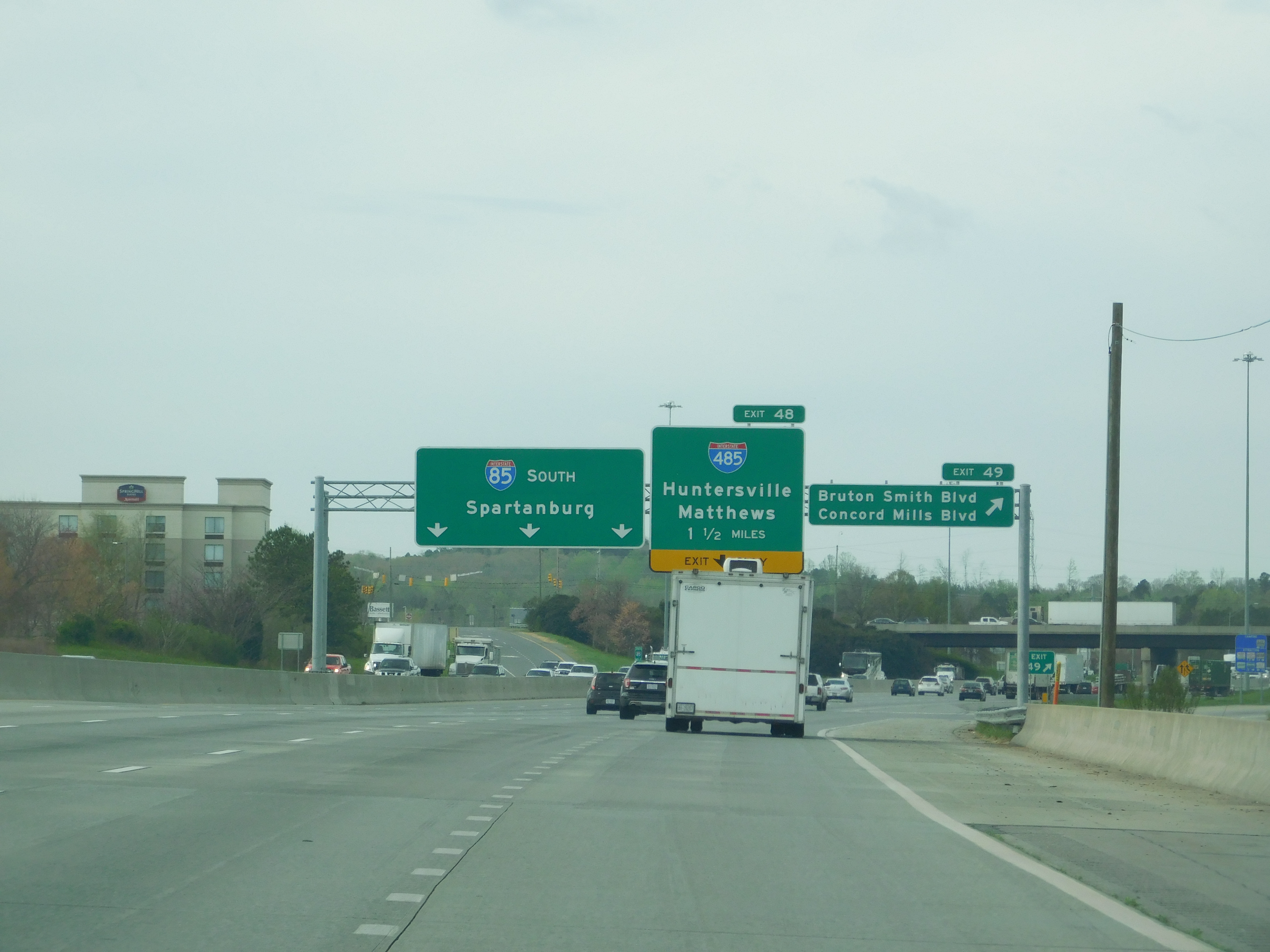
I-85 southbound in Concord near the I-485 interchange

Northeast of Charlotte, I-85 continues in the northeast-southwest orientation when traveling into Greensboro. Upon crossing into Cabarrus County, the interstate enters into the western areas of Concord. The corridor comes to exit 49 (Bruton Smith Boulevard/Concord Mills Boulevard), which gives access for several major attractions such as the Concord Mills Mall and Charlotte Motor Speedway. Several miles later, it comes to the diverging diamond interchange with NC 73 and then crosses Coddle Creek. It comes to another junction with US 29, alongside US 601. While heading into Kannapolis, the exit of which US 29 gives access to the North Carolina Research Campus. US 601 merges onto I-85, forming another concurrency, in which the two routes continue northward and come to one surrounding rest area. The highway traverses in the southern outskirts of Kannapolis with several exits available, then the road crosses the Cold Water Creek, which parallels the highway, before entering Rowan County. I-85 enters into the combination of suburban and rural development, while going into the southern areas of Salisbury, in which US 601 diverges from I-85 when the interstate comes to the exit with Jake Alexander Boulevard. Continuing Salisbury, I-85 comes to the single-point urban interchange with US 52. In this vicinity, US 52 merges onto I-85, in which the two routes exits Salisbury. Inside Spencer, I-85/US 52 enters Davidson County and crosses the Yadkin River on the Yadkin River Veterans Memorial Bridge. The route then comes to the interchange with US 29, US 70, and NC 150 near the unincorporated community of Linwood. This interchange gives direct access to NC 150 northbound and US 29/US 70 southbound. US 29 and US 70 converge with I-85/US 52, before comes to the half-interchange, which is the southern terminus of I-285. This interchange is accessible to only northbound traffic, and gives access to Winston-Salem. It is this vicinity, all three U.S. Highways that overlapped I-85, merges onto I-285.

After the interchange, I-85 turns slightly east for one mile (1.6 km) and intersects NC 47 (Hargrave Road). Because the previous exit is northbound-only, drivers going southbound must use NC 47 to access I-285. After its interchange with NC 8 (Cotton Grove Road), which is the main exit for Lexington, I-85 enters a large forest and crosses Abbotts Creek, then has an interchange with US 64. Past Holly Grove Road, the northbound lanes cut under the southbound lanes and cross Hamby Creek, diverting traffic to the left side of the road. The reversed lanes of I-85 then pass over Squire Bowers Road and reach a rest area, as well as access to the North Carolina Vietnam Veterans Memorial Park. Once the reversed lanes of the Interstate cross Johnsontown Road, the northbound lanes pass above the southbound lanes and return to the normal direction (right side of the road).

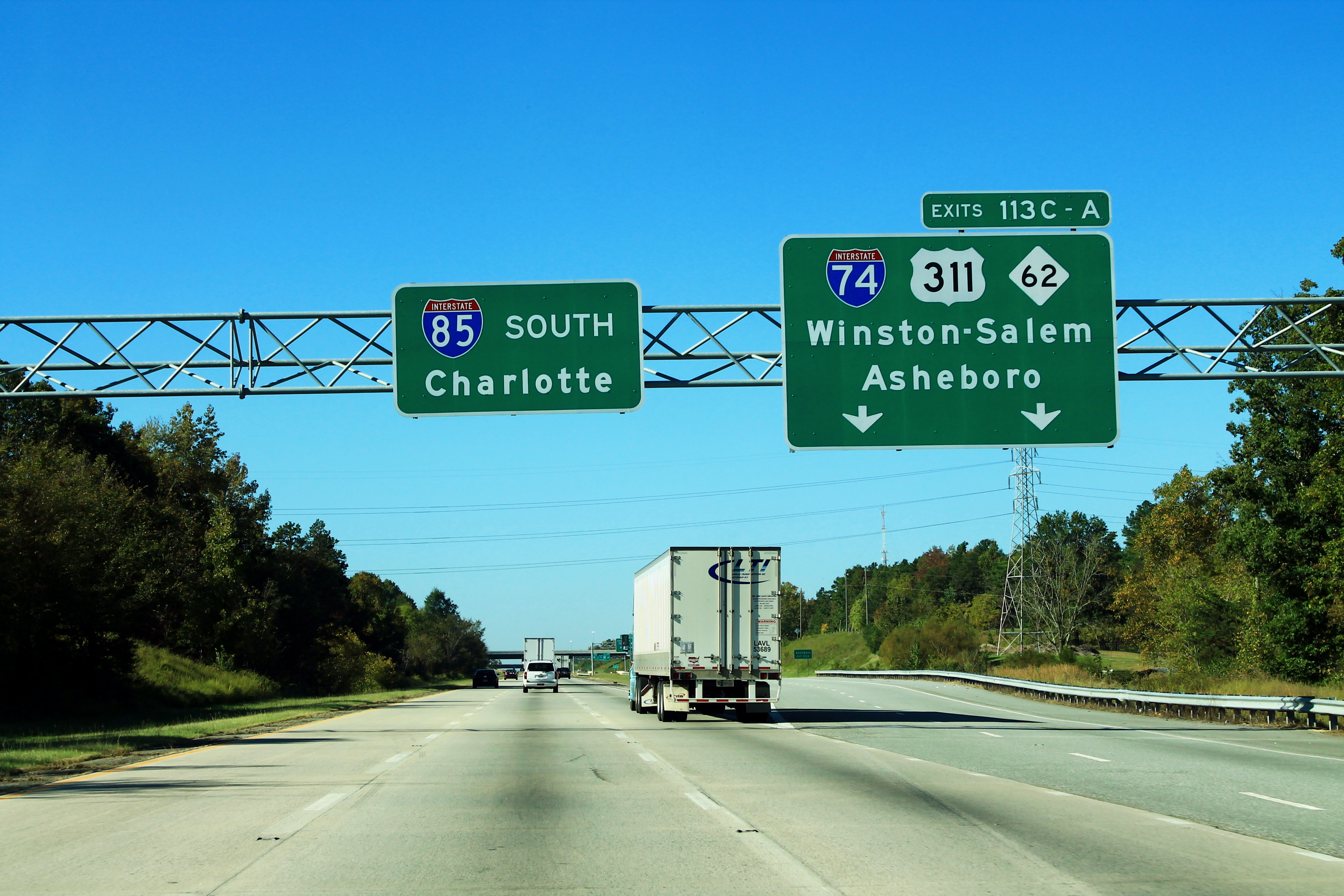
I-85 southbound at exit 113 for I-74 and NC 62

The forest gradually thins out and gives way to the city of Thomasville, where I-85 meets NC 109. It crosses into Randolph County as it enters the city of Archdale and intersects NC 62. I-85 enters High Point and has a parclo interchange with I-74, which gives east access to Asheboro and west access to Winston-Salem. I-85 then traverses into another forest with further trees lining the median, while crossing into the Randolph and Guilford branches of the Richland Creek, before the interstate enters into Guilford County. Going towards Greensboro, I-85 have the southbound interchange with US 29 again. US 29 forms a brief concurrency with I-85 before the route enters suburban areas once more and reaches a very large and complex interchange with Groometown Road, Grandover Parkway, I-73, US 220, and US 421. It is also at this junction, where US 29 diverges from I-85 and continues into the central areas of Greensboro, while US 421 joins I-85 from I-73 in a wrong-way concurrency.

=== Greensboro to Durham ===
I-85 traverses the southern outskirts of Greensboro, with US 421 being concurrent with the interstate in the established duration of four miles (6.4 km). I-85 comes to the diamond interchange with South Elm-Eugene Street, which gives access to Downtown Greensboro, which is miles north of the corridor, alongside the adjacent central areas of the city. I-85 comes to the subsequent large interchange, in which US 421 leaves I-85 in this vicinity. US 421 traverses south to Sanford, while the undesignated stretch to the north connects to the eastern areas of central Greensboro. I-85 maintains its northeastward track, before reaching the interchange for I-785, I-40, and I-840, in which the former and latter of which have their southern and eastern terminus at I-85 respectively. I-40 merges onto I-85 and the two routes share the east–west concurrency for 31 miles (50 km). The two interstates are included in the Piedmont Crescent, while traversing south of the downtown centers of Elon, Burlington, Graham, and Mebane. I-40/I-85 comes to the interchanges with NC 61, NC 62, NC 49, NC 87, and NC 54, and also crosses the Haw River. After coming to the diverging diamond interchange with NC 119 (Mebane-Oaks Road), the corridor exits from Alamance County and enters into Orange County, in which the interstates also comes to another truck weigh station. I-85/I-40 enters into the southern outskirts of Hillsborough, in which I-40 diverges from I-85. I-40 travels southeast into the northern outskirts Chapel Hill, the southern outskirts of Durham, and the city of Raleigh; while I-85 continues northeast into central Durham.

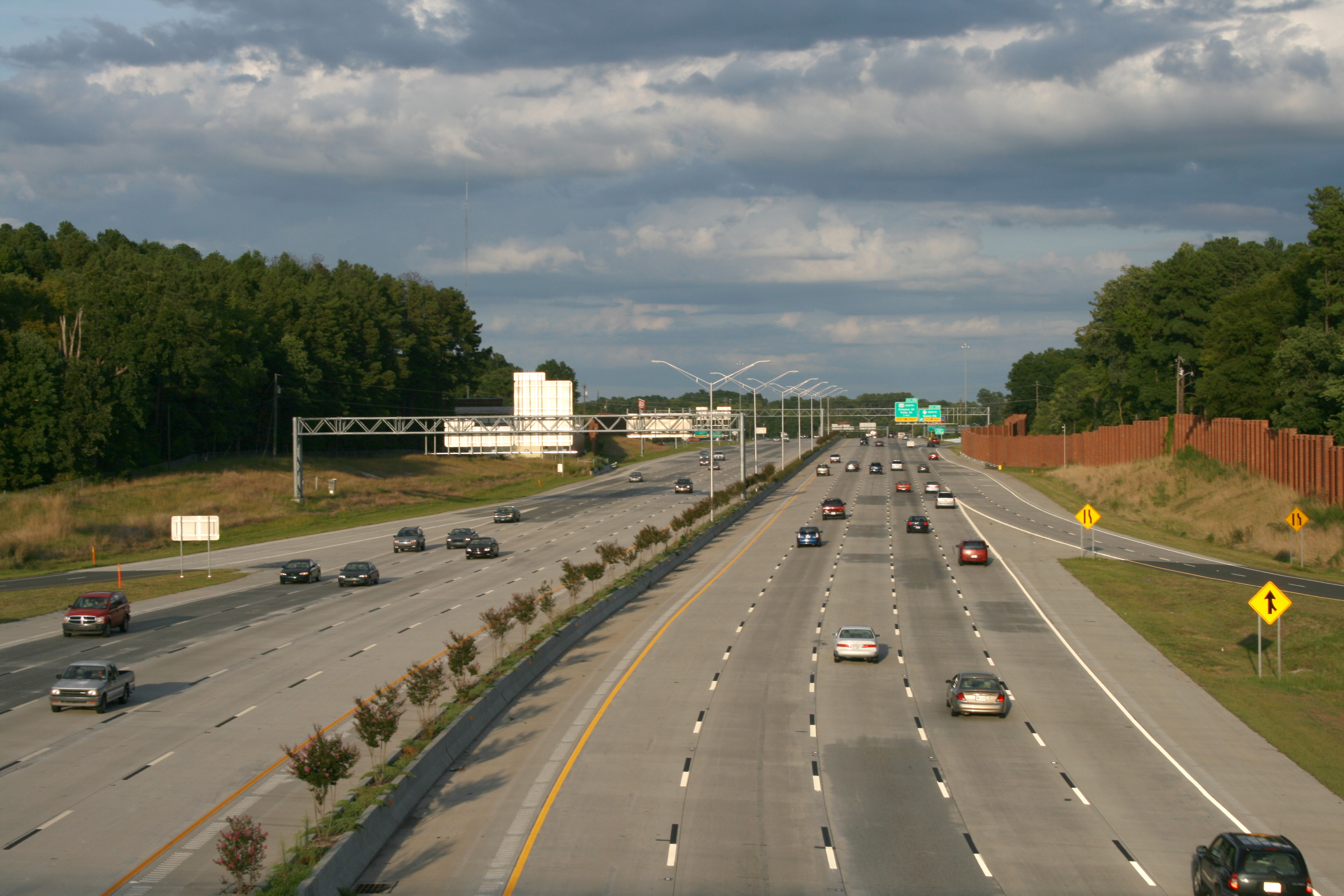
I-85 northbound passing through Durham

The following interchanges of I-85 before entering Durham County are substandard in quality due to the Interstate retaining its original narrow design of four lanes and the ages of the bridges and interchanges. It meets NC 86 and later US 70, which forms another concurrency once again before entering Durham County. At mile marker 172, it meets the northern terminus of NC 147 (Durham Freeway) which connects to downtown Durham. I-85/US 70 then reaches the main city center and becomes somewhat urban in nature. The highway has an interchange with US 15 and US 501, which both join the concurrency. The highway passes a diamond interchange with NC 157 (Guess Road) and shortly after, US 501 splits off at Duke Street to head north. The other three highways continue on their way before meeting the western terminus of NC 55 (Avondale Drive). Just before exiting Durham, US 70 departs the concurrency as well to head east alongside I-85's fourth and final auxiliary route I-885 (Durham East End Connector) for the Raleigh–Durham International Airport and Raleigh itself while I-85 and US 15 remain connected and head northward.

=== Durham to Virginia ===
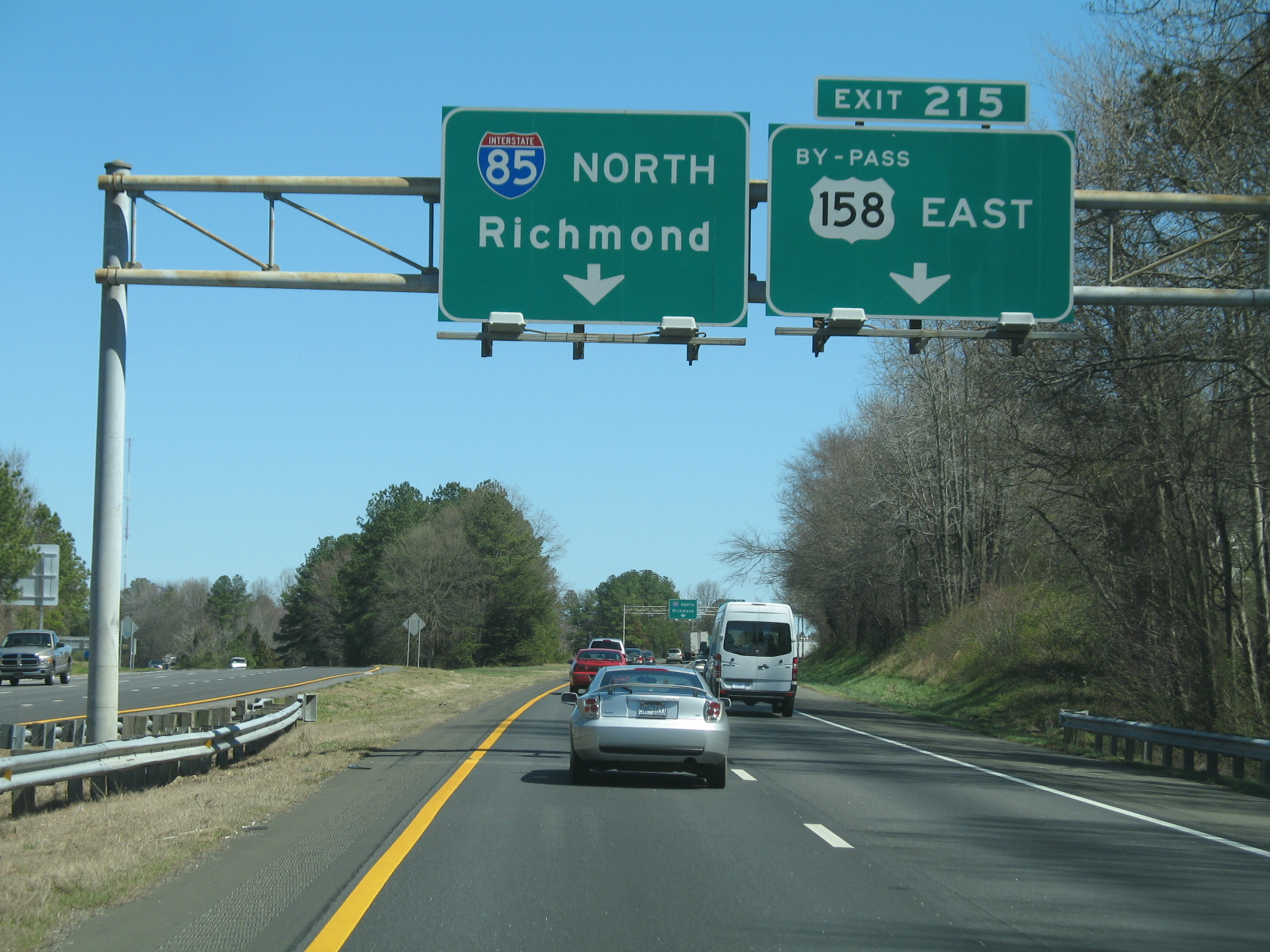
I-85 northbound at its split with US 158

North of Durham, I-85/US 15 passes several more minor interchanges before entering Granville County and suburban areas. The landscape gives way to rural areas and yet another forest as the highway makes its way across Falls Lake. US 15 departs I-85 at mile marker 186 to serve the town and city of Butner and Creedmoor respectively, whereas I-85 bypasses these areas but still contains some exits leading to Butner. From here to Oxford, US 15 parallels I-85. The Interstate then intersects NC 56 outside of Butner and continues to make its way through the forest for about 10 miles (16 km) without any other interchanges. I-85 then crosses the Tar River and comes to another rest area. It meets US 15 at another interchange just near mile marker 202 nearing Oxford. Interchanges with NC 96 and US 158 immediately follow, then I-85 cuts into Vance County.

It immediately reaches the city limits of Henderson before beginning a brief concurrency with US 158 (Dabney Drive). The highway intersects NC 39, the main exit for Henderson, then US 158 splits off from the concurrency shortly after. At mile marker 218, I-85 has a southbound exit for US 1, which begins paralleling it for the rest of the Interstate's length through the state. I-85 passes just west of Middleburg and has a parclo interchange with US 1/US 158 (Flemingtown Road) for the town of Norlina. I-85 then enters its final county in the state, Warren County. Before long, it bypasses Manson and continues to go through generally flat farmland and rolling hills with no development along the road. Just before leaving North Carolina, I-85 has its final interchange in the state with US 1 and the northern terminus of US 401 near the unincorporated community of Wise, with the southbound lanes then having an exit for the welcome center. Shortly after this, it exits North Carolina and crosses the state line into Mecklenburg County, Virginia.

=== Dedicated and memorial names ===
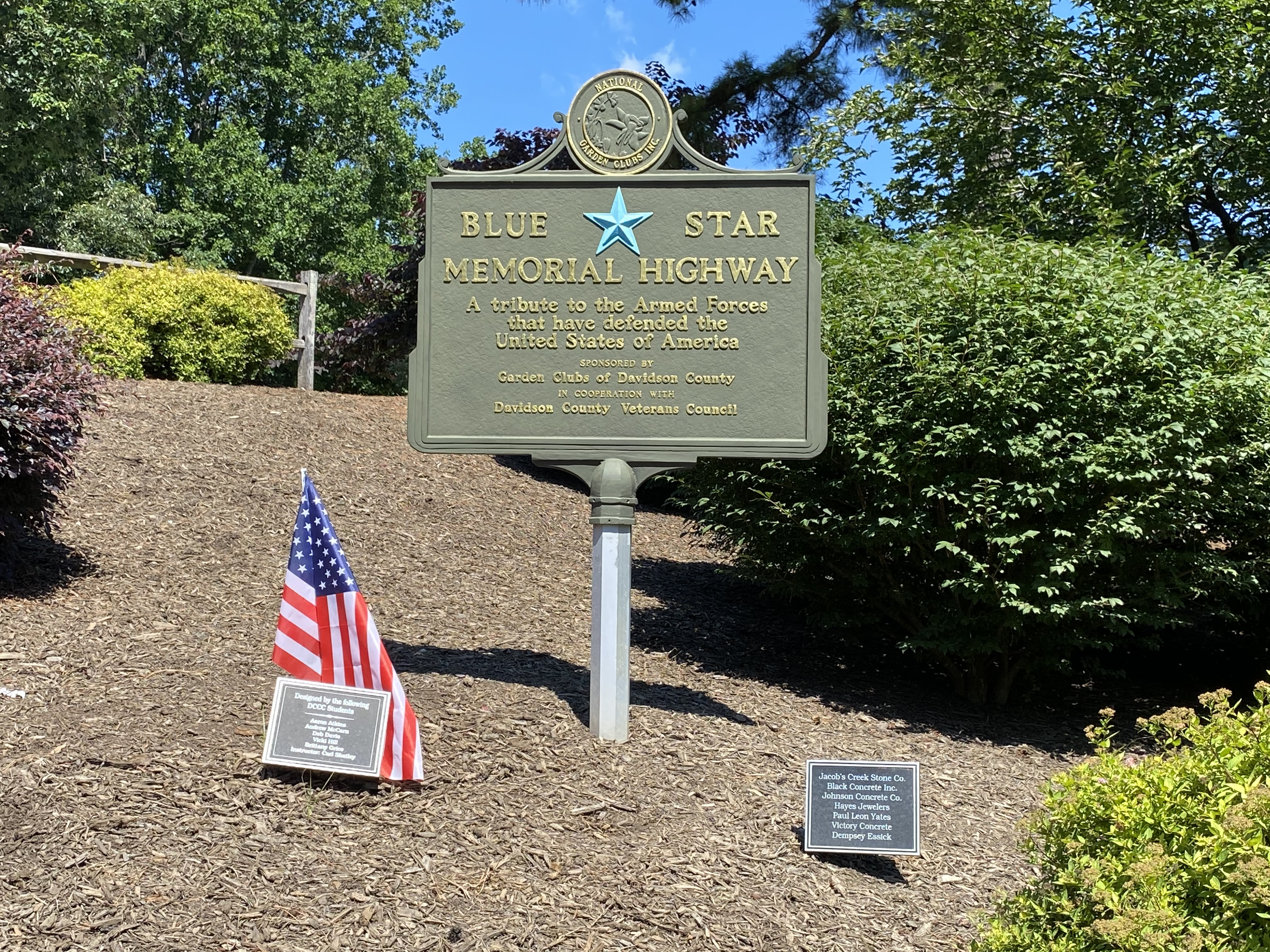
Sign dedicating the Blue Star Memorial Highway along I-85 in Davidson County

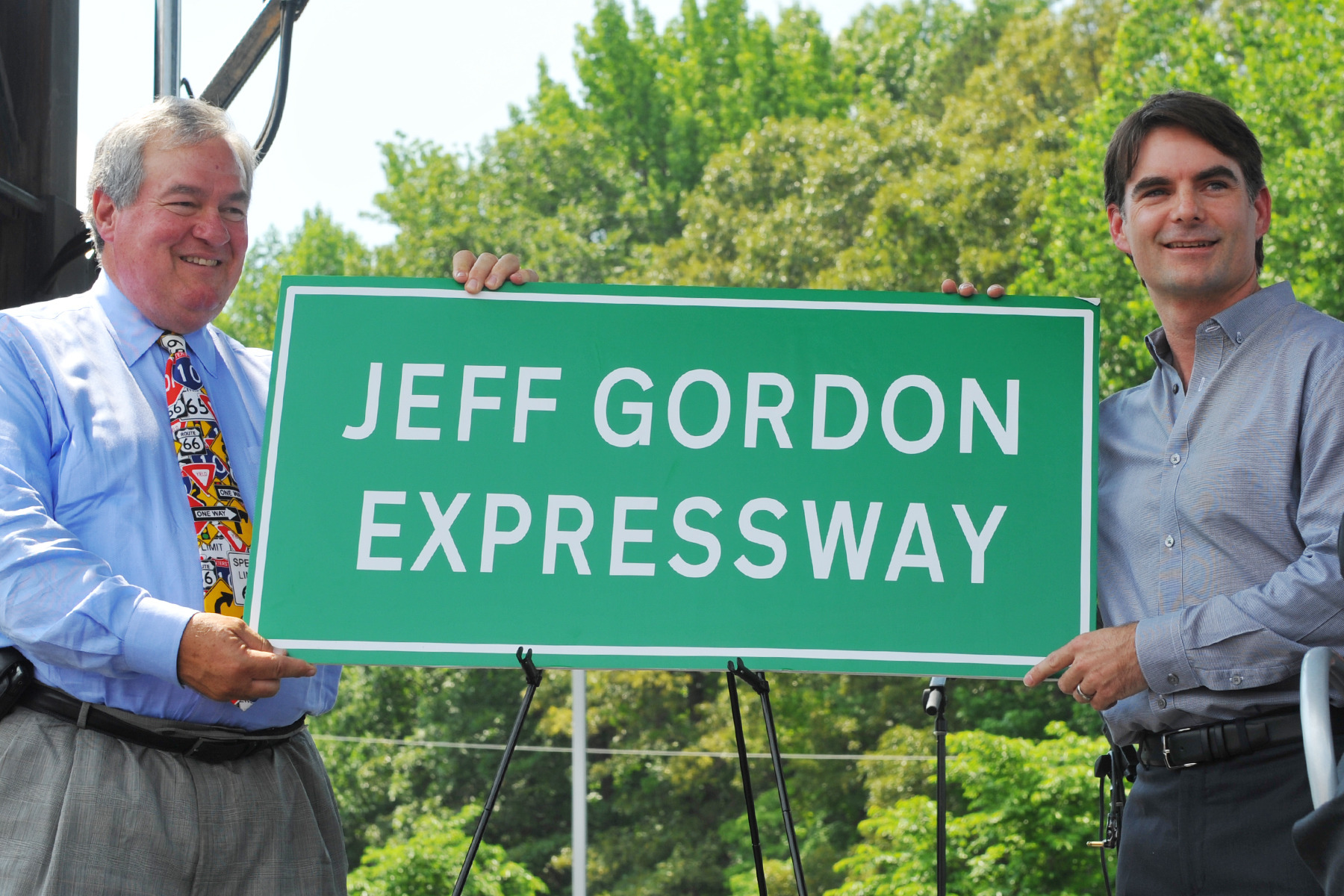
Secretary of the North Carolina Department of Transportation Gene Conti and NASCAR driver Jeff Gordon unveiling a sign for the Jeff Gordon Expressway

I-85 in North Carolina features a few dedicated or memorialized stretches of freeway. The entire length of the Interstate is known as the Blue Star Memorial Highway, approved on May 5, 1967. Through Gaston County, I-85 is known as the Senator Marshall Arthur Rauch Highway, being signed on October 3, 1997. Between the I-77/US 21 interchange and the I-85 Connector (exit 42) in Charlotte, the route is known as the Julius Chambers Highway, named in honor of the civil rights attorney Julius L. Chambers. From Charlotte to the Mecklenburg/Cabarrus county line, the route is known as the Jeff Gordon Expressway after NASCAR driver Jeff Gordon. This section of the highway was signed on May 25, 2012. From mile marker 92 to 96, the Interstate is known as the Bob Timberlake Freeway after the artist of the same name. On mile marker 96 to 102, I-85 is known as the Richard Childress Freeway after the NASCAR driver. At Alamance Church Road (exit 128) to the I-40 interchange (exit 131), I-85 is known as the Congressman J. Howard Coble Highway, signed on December 1, 2016, after Howard Coble, who represented North Carolina's 6th congressional district for over 30 years. From the Guilford−Alamance county line to milepost 148 in Graham, I-85, concurrent with I-40, is known as the Sam Hunt Freeway, named after R. Samuel Hunt, a representative for North Carolina's 25th House district as well as the Secretary for NCDOT. This designation was approved on September 5, 1997. From milepost 173 to milepost 178 in northern Durham, I-85, concurrent with US 70, is known as the Dr. John H. Franklin Highway, named after John Hope Franklin, an American historian and recipient of the Presidential Medal of Freedom. This name was approved on October 5, 2017. Between milepost 220 to the Vance/Warren county line, the Interstate is known as the Andrea L. Harris Highway after Andrea Harris, a civil rights activist from the state. This designation was approved on December 15, 2023, by Governor Roy Cooper.

I-85 also has two dedicated bridges, both in Gaston County. The bridge over the South Fork River, a branch of the Catawba River, is known as the William James Pharr Bridge, named after William James Pharr Sr., a mayor of McAdenville for over 25 years. This was approved on August 5, 1994. The bridge over the main Catawba River between Gaston and Mecklenburg counties is known as the Cameron Morrison Bridge, which was named after Cameron A. Morrison, the 55th governor of North Carolina and known as the Good Roads Governor. It was signed on March 11, 1983. Despite the naming of the bridge, it has sparked controversy due to Morrison being remembered for leading the Red Shirts group. NCDOT has not announced any new petitions to change the name, but explained that applications could be considered.

== History ==
=== Predecessor highways ===
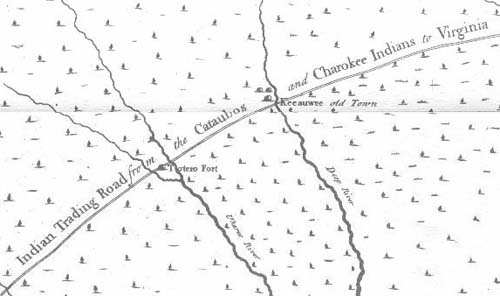
The route of the "Great Trading Path" passes through roughly the same terrain that I-85 also travels along today.

The path that would eventually be developed into I-85 existed as a long Native American trail running from Petersburg, Virginia, all the way to Augusta, Georgia, with a distance of over 500 miles (800 km), known as the "Great Trading Path". Most of this land was unexplored, with animals mainly traveling along it. American Indians had unique ways to mark their path by tying the sapling of a tree into a knot. Because of this, the top of the sapling would always point to the correct direction. The sapling was determined by historians to be somewhere on Beech Mountain, in present-day Avery and Watauga counties. Although the sapling was somewhere within the territory of the present Cherokee tribe, authorities determined that the sapling was located on or near the Great Trading Path in this area. The path, lesser known as the "Occaneechi Path," was mainly traversed by the Saponi and Occaneechi, often trading with the Cherokee and Catawba tribes, both of whom were enemies at the time. While the path was rather narrow and made by animals, it later became much easier to navigate through. Starting with the Europeans' arrival in the 1670s, the fur trade boomed and increased the demand for furs, leading the trail to become a wagon road in the 1740s.

Beginning in what was then known as Fort Henry and now is Petersburg, the travelers made their way into the state through the land now part of Granville County. This trail went through the counties of which I-85 would pass through, and the travelers eventually met the tribal groups that would form the names of several of the state's areas. The trail then made its way across the Tar, Haw, Uwharrie, and Yadkin rivers, most of the rivers paralleling I-85. Upon reaching what would become Charlotte, the trail then split in two, with one of them heading for Columbia, South Carolina, and the other towards Cherokee land near present-day Augusta. In 1670, John Lederer became the first European to explore the trail and describe it in his writings. In 1700, explorer John Lawson began his journey through the path. The trip took 59 days and covered a distance of over 550 miles (890 km). In 1799, when William Whedbee Kirkland built his house, Ayr Mount, the Great Trading Path had become a major thoroughfare through the state, with lots of cargo being transported. The amount of commerce brought through the route continued into the present day, where the trail would be replaced by I-85.

=== Initial design and construction ===
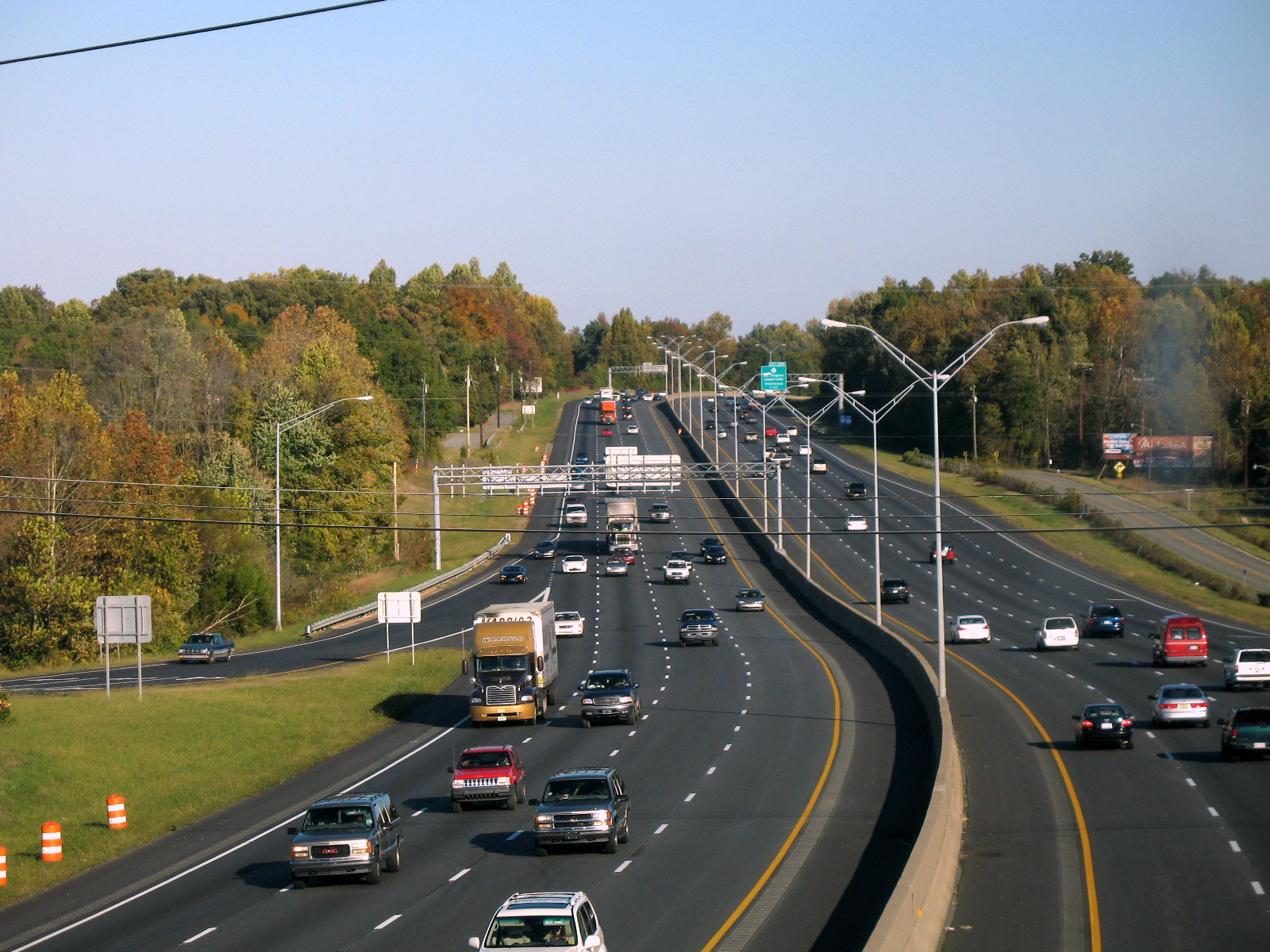
I-40/I-85 through Burlington

The general alignment for the freeway that would eventually become I-85 was first included in the 1939 report, titled Toll Roads and Free Roads, the National Interregional Highway Committee's report from 1944, titled Interregional Highways, and the subsequent 1947 plan produced by the Public Roads Administration, which was part of the now-defunct Federal Works Agency. Parts of I-85 were already constructed before federal aid was available in the 1950s, as the state had been constructing sections of the Interstate Highway System since 1949, which parts of them were then formed into I-85. The Lexington Bypass north of Lexington—which at the time was signed US 29 and US 70—is now a part of I-85 Bus. This was part of an 80-mile (130 km) expressway completed in 1955 between Lexington and Hillsborough. One planned road was the Salisbury Bypass, 15 miles (24 km) long with a $1-million (equivalent to $9.37 million in 2025) 880-foot (270 m) twin-span bridge over the Yadkin River. Construction on the bypass and bridge started in 1955, but the lanes were not as wide as federal standards required, and the road had a sharp curve north of the bridge. Both of these characteristics saved money, and the bridge was grandfathered despite not meeting standards. On June 18, 1958, the bypass and bridge were fully completed and opened to the public. The very first stretch of I-85 to be constructed as part of the Federal-Aid Highway Act of 1956 was an 11.3-mile (18.2 km) segment through Mecklenburg County. Known as the "Charlotte Bypass" at the time, this portion of the Interstate was fully opened to traffic on September 9, 1958. At the time, I-85 only served as a bypass of Charlotte, and was also referred to as the "US 29 Bypass". Since I-85 was nothing more than a few segments of eleven-and-twelve-mile (18 and 19 km) stretches, service stations were not far away by any means. Green guide signs were also erected to warn of any upcoming access roads ahead in case travelers would want to exit off the Interstate. To mitigate stress and panic, the common I-85 interstate shield with the colors red, white, and blue would occasionally show up to keep drivers relaxed, calm, and figuring out which way they were going.

In 1960, I-85 underwent major construction, with its first finished section in that year being an 18-mile (29 km) segment within Vance and Warren counties, with the next segment after that being a 46-mile (74 km) section between West Durham and Greensboro opening to traffic that year. A portion of US 29/US 70 also became I-85 after grade separations and access control were completed and secured. Before the end of the year, several other sections of I-85 were also completed and opened, with a 14-mile (23 km) section of the "Charlotte Bypass", a 15.4-mile segment of the Salisbury Bypass, a 13.8-mile segment between Greensboro and Whitsett, an 18.3-mile segment between Henderson and the Virginia line, and the last section being a 22.2-mile segment between Whitsett and Efland. A section of I-85 from the end of the "Charlotte Bypass" to the NC 273 interchange near Belmont was planned to open on December 1 by the end of the year. This section of the Interstate had a length of approximately 4.7 miles (7.6 km) and ended at NC 273. While the pavement at the interchange had been laid, traffic lights were not installed at the junction with Wilkinson Boulevard yet. The proposal was indefinitely delayed later on due to complications. Although the interchange was mostly complete, construction was still progressing on the south side of the intersection with traffic lights still to be installed. In addition, cold weather had also played a role in the delay. However, on January 17, 1961, this link of I-85 between Charlotte and Belmont opened to traffic at approximately 3:30 pm. To control traffic flow, special ultra-sonic vehicle detectors were placed over the Interstate. They were the first vehicle detectors to be used in the North Carolina highway system, and the detectors would count the number of vehicles and regulate the traffic lights along the interchange to allow proper traffic safety. The Interstate would later on continue towards the South Carolina state line by avoiding Gastonia to the north.

On December 9, 1963, the County Commissioner of the state received a letter notifying that the Gastonia link of I-85 would be set for dedication on January 10. This link of I-85 would allow drivers to bypass Franklin Boulevard, the main street through the city, which was often congested and avoid over 22 traffic lights along the road. On January 10, 1964, the dedication of the I-85 link officially began with federal highway administrator Rex M. Whitton giving a rather short dedication speech. He noted that this link of I-85 was part of 107 miles (172 km) of the entire Interstate's length in North Carolina. A ribbon-cutting ceremony then commenced with Whitton and his wife being driven to a ribbon. Upon snipping the ribbon, it officially opened this segment of I-85 that would skirt around the northern portion of Gastonia. By 1965, I-85 from the South Carolina border to Charlotte was complete, while it took until 1970 for the section between Charlotte and Durham to be completed. However, the "Temporary 85" designation would remain on the segment between Lexington and Greensboro until 1984 because there were too many access roads. That year, a new six-lane section opened, resulting in the "Temporary 85" designation to be dropped. As of January 1, 1965, the Interstate had a total mileage of 133.6 miles (215.0 km) through the state, which was more than any other Interstate in North Carolina at the time.

From 1969 to 1972, several more segments of I-85 were opened to traffic. On December 22, 1969, an 11.4-mile (18.3 km) section from China Grove to Concord was opened, with the commission adding that around the next year, another 8.6-mile (13.8 km) portion of the highway from Concord to Mecklenburg County as well as a connector to Charlotte would also be completed. The stretch of I-85 from Henderson to the Virginia state line, a distance of approximately 3.1 miles (5.0 km) opened to traffic on December 2, 1970. On December 15, 1970, governor Bob Scott announced that about a year from then, all of I-85 would be completed in the state except for a stretch between Greensboro and Lexington. Scott also announced that by June, the remaining 8 miles (13 km) of the Interstate in Mecklenburg County would be opened. Explaining that the Henderson bypass was finished and the "missing link" from Durham to Henderson was still in construction but opens the year after, he noted that just 20 miles (32 km) of Interstate Highway built in a state costed a total of $19 million, or about $1 million every mile, but explained that Interstate Highways were much safer than regular highways. While the segment of I-85 in Durham was still under development, it was projected to open in December 1971, closing the I-85 gap.

Through September 1971, another 7-mile (11 km) section of I-85 from Oxford to Henderson was open, which left a 12.5-mile (20.1 km) portion of the highway from the Neuse River to Oxford remaining and under construction. Another 35-mile (56 km) segment of the highway from Greensboro to Salisbury was undergoing an environmental study and not planned to be let to contract yet, though on June 19, 1984, this was given the name of I-85 Business, which rerouted I-85 away from Greensboro. On January 13, 1972, the 16-mile (26 km) stretch of I-85 north of Durham, which was projected to be finished in December 1971, was completed and opened. Costing approximately $16 million, this stretch of the highway was often nicknamed "the missing link", due to the fast-moving traffic of the Interstate Highway's predecessor, US 15, considered as one of the deadliest roads in the state. The opening resulted in most of I-85 being interstate standard and four-laned. Initially in December 1970, the 2.3-mile (3.7 km) stretch in Henderson as well as the 11-mile (18 km) segment from Oxford to Henderson costed a total of $30 million, which was a part of the "missing link" segment of the Interstate. The opening of the section on January 13 joined all sections north of Durham, resulting in a trip taking approximately 35 minutes from the city to Henderson. The completion of I-85 in this area officially connected the Interstate as a 235-mile (378 km) route through North Carolina.

=== Projects and later history ===
==== Fencing and widening ====
Since its completion, many widening projects have been undertaken on I-85, particularly along the stretch of highway between Gastonia and Durham. On December 19, 1958, a highway fencing project during the Interstate's construction began to experiment with safety along the highway. As the first fencing project in the state, the contract price, done by the Butler Brothers of Greensboro, was estimated at a total of $103,000. Authorities announced that the fence would be worth the price if it would help cut down the number of accidents along the Interstate. Both sides–north and southbound–would have fencing extend a total of about 18 miles (29 km). Fencing would not be required if the highway passed over steep cuts or high fills. There were two types of fencing that would be used. Near interchanges and through cities, heavy chain-link fencing would be placed. On the northern and western ends, woven wire fastened to wooden posts would have barbed wire both top and bottom. The project was estimated to use over 47,000 feet (14,000 m) of chain-link and 55,000 feet (17,000 m) of woven wire. In December 1971, a study was planned to try and remedy traffic along the corridor after 3 traffic jams occurred at Greensboro, Burlington, and through US 15. Commissioner Cliff Benson announced that an extension of I-40 could be done along a southern route between Durham and Raleigh. Another solution that was thought of was if I-85 could be widened to six lanes between Greensboro and Durham. Problems arose, however, due to the fact that if an Interstate was completed, it would be the state's responsibility to maintain the corridor. Due to this, engineers said that the widening of I-85 would possibly only be completed around 1976 or 1978.

By 1988, widening I-85 to six lanes from Greensboro to Burlington was being considered, instead of a decade prior. The plan was later changed to eight lanes. The $175-million (equivalent to $395 million in 2025) project began in 1989. With the opening of a 2.3-mile (3.7 km) section in Alamance County on November 23, 1994, 21 miles (34 km) of I-85/I-40 were eight lanes. An additional 14 miles (23 km) were to be ready by 1996, extending the Interstate's eight lanes to milepost 164 in Hillsborough, and these lanes were then opened by February 2, 1997. In addition, I-85 was relocated in 2004, south of most of Greensboro, forming one stretch of the Greensboro Urban Loop. Between 2004 and 2008, I-85 was widened to eight lanes around Salisbury. From May 2010 through April 2014, I-85 was widened from four to eight lanes between Bruton Smith Boulevard/Concord Mills Boulevard (near Charlotte Motor Speedway and Concord Mills) and NC 73 (Davidson Highway).

Following the completion of the widening of I-85 from milepost 49 to 55, a new project was started to widen I-85 from NC 73 in Concord northward to NC 152 in the town of China Grove. Like the prior project, I-85 was doubled in capacity, expanding from two travel lanes in each direction to four travel lanes in each direction. The first phase from NC 73 to the Lane Street interchange began in early 2014, and the second phase from Lane Street to NC 152 began in early 2017. Construction was completed by December 2017, which left I-85 with at least six lanes of highway between the US 29 north/US 74 interchange in Kings Mountain and the I-40 interchange in Hillsborough. In that same month, the US 321 interchange was reconstructed to help control the flow of traffic and was completed on February 26, 2021, relieving traffic problems. Around November 2021, a new project by NCDOT called the "Integrated Corridor Management System" began along I-85 in Mecklenburg and Gaston counties. The project used cameras, electronic signs, and traffic lights that were remote-controlled. This also involved upgrading 94 traffic lights, adding two signs, and placing 11 cameras into the system to help predict any potential accident. In 2024, from the US 321 interchange to I-485 through Gaston and Mecklenburg counties, due to congestion along the Interstate, the lanes are undergoing a study to accommodate larger amounts of traffic.

==== I-85 Corridor Improvement Project ====
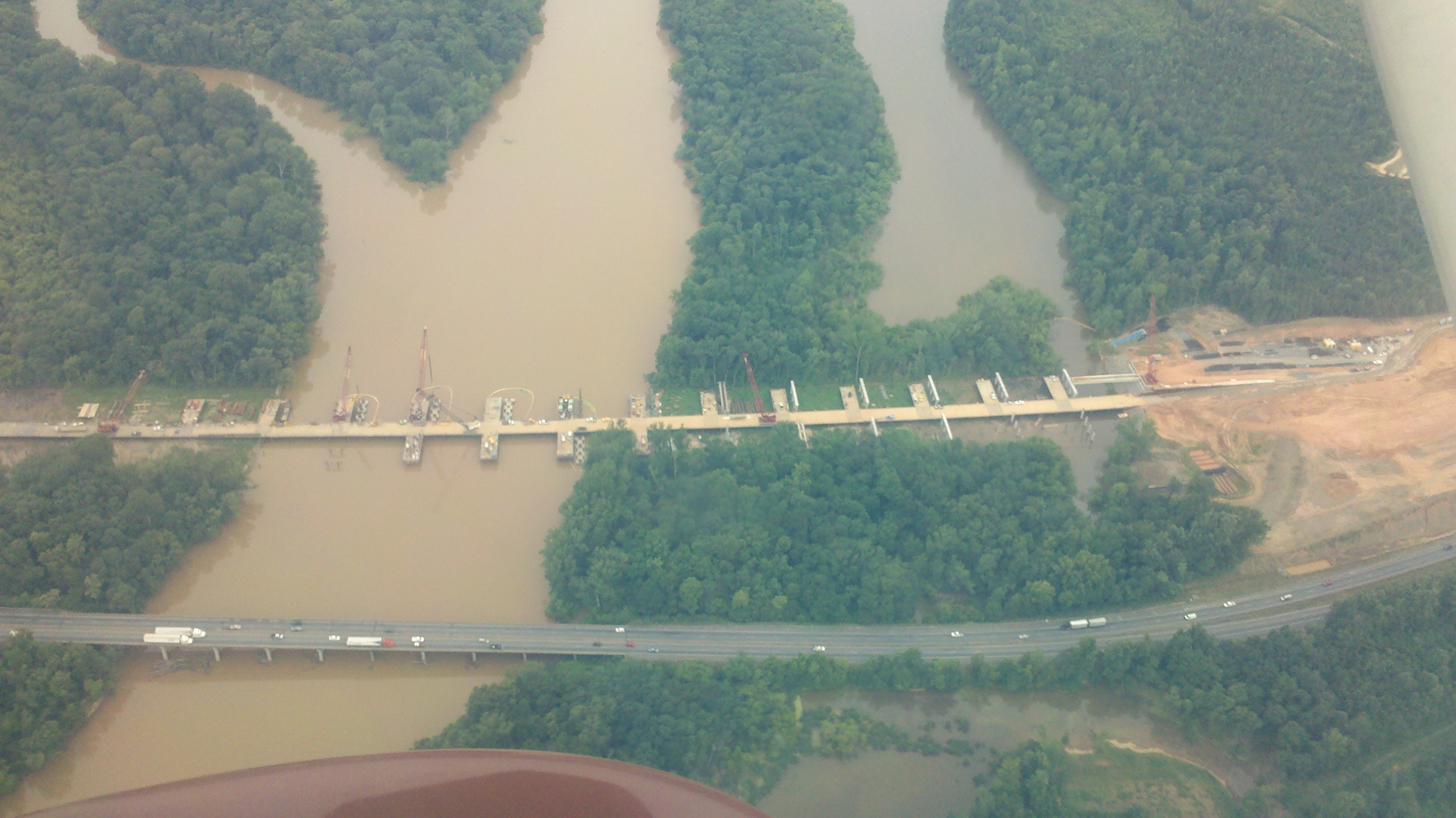
Crews performing work on the Yadkin River bridge for the Corridor Improvement Project

The I-85 Corridor Improvement Project, located in Rowan and Davidson counties, was a two-phase project to replace the narrow bridge over the Yadkin River and widen the freeway from four to eight lanes. This was part of the larger widening project from Charlotte to Lexington, which extended the highway from four to eight lanes. In the first phase, all traffic from the old bridge moved to a new $201-million (equivalent to $278 million in 2025) bridge in August 2012. The second phase of the project involved widening the northern segment of I-85 to a length of 3.8 miles (6.1 km). On March 9, 2013, all eight lanes of the I-85 bridge opened to the public. The project finished eight months ahead of schedule and $44 million (equivalent to $60.9 million in 2025) under budget. In addition to this, it also included placing 1.2 million cubic yards of embankment material, install 4 new miles of storm drainage, and ready about 320,000 square yards of road to add new pavement on it. Storm water would also be controlled by adding and modifying over 1,000 erosion control features. Other features of construction included temporary ramps to make the process of building the inner lanes easier. Trucks were also required to use these ramps to reduce the number of truckloads that were along the Interstate. Upon completion of the project, this resulted in the Belmont Road interchange (exit 86) being reconstructed and the Clark Road interchange (exit 85) being closed permanently.

== Exit list ==
County	Location	mi	km	Exit	Destinations	Notes
Cleveland	Grover	0.00	0.00		I-85 south – Spartanburg	Continuation from South Carolina
Cleveland		1.8	2.9	2	NC 216 – Kings Mountain National Military Park	
Cleveland		3.6	5.8	4	US 29 south	Southern end of US 29 concurrency; southbound exit and northbound entrance
Cleveland		4.8	7.7	5	Kings Mountain Blvd / Dixon School Road	To be converted into diverging diamond interchange
Cleveland	Kings Mountain	7.6	12.2	8	NC 161 – Kings Mountain	
Gaston	Kings Mountain	10.0	16.1	10A	US 29 north / US 74 east	Northern end of US 29 concurrency
Gaston		10.0	16.1	10B	US 74 west – Kings Mountain, Shelby	
Gaston	Bessemer City	12.8	20.6	13	Edgewood Road – Bessemer City	
Gaston	Gastonia	14.5	23.3	14	NC 274 – East Bessemer City, West Gastonia	
Gaston	Gastonia	17.0	27.4	17	US 321 – Gastonia, Lincolnton	Signed as exits 17A (south) and 17B (north) southbound
Gaston	Gastonia	19.0	30.6	19	NC 7 – East Gastonia	
Gaston	Gastonia	19.7	31.7	20	NC 279 (New Hope Road) – Dallas	
Gaston	Gastonia	20.6	33.2	21	Cox Road – Ranlo	
Gaston	Lowell	22.3	35.9	22	Main Street – Cramerton, Lowell	
Gaston	Lowell	23.2	37.3	23	NC 7 – Lowell, McAdenville	
Gaston	Belmont	25.7	41.4	26	Belmont–Mount Holly Road – Belmont, Mount Holly	To Belmont Abbey College
Gaston	Belmont	26.9	43.3	27	NC 273 – Belmont, Mount Holly	
Catawba River				Cameron Morrison Bridge		
Mecklenburg		29.4	47.3	29	Sam Wilson Road	To U.S. National Whitewater Center
Mecklenburg		30.3	48.8	30	I-485 to I-77 – Pineville, Huntersville	Signed southbound as exits 30B (north/inner) and 30A (south/outer); I-485 exit 10
Mecklenburg	Charlotte	32.0	51.5	32	Little Rock Road – CLT Airport	Single-point urban interchange
Mecklenburg	Charlotte	33.2	53.4	33	Billy Graham Parkway (Charlotte Route 4) – Farmers Market	To Billy Graham Library
Mecklenburg	Charlotte	34.7	55.8	34	NC 27 (Freedom Drive) / Tuckaseegee Road	Single-point urban interchange at NC 27; Tuckaseegee Road only directly accessible northbound
Mecklenburg	Charlotte	35.4	57.0	35	Glenwood Drive	
Mecklenburg	Charlotte	36.2	58.3	36	NC 16 (Brookshire Boulevard) to US 74 east – Downtown Charlotte	Single-point urban interchange
Mecklenburg	Charlotte	37.8	60.8	37	Beatties Ford Road – Johnson C. Smith University	
Mecklenburg	Charlotte	38.2	61.5	38	I-77 / US 21 – Statesville, Columbia	Hybrid interchange; I-77 exits 13A-B; southbound exit ramp and northbound entrance ramp include access to/from I-77 Express Lanes south
Mecklenburg	Charlotte	38.8	62.4	39	Statesville Avenue / Statesville Road	
Mecklenburg	Charlotte	40.5	65.2	40	Graham Street	
Mecklenburg	Charlotte	41.3	66.5	41	Sugar Creek Road (Charlotte Route 4)	
Mecklenburg	Charlotte	42.3	68.1	42	To US 29 / NC 49 (N. Tryon Street)	Northbound exit and southbound entrance; access via I-85 Connector
Mecklenburg	Charlotte	43.0	69.2	43	University City Boulevard to NC 49 / Ikea Boulevard	
Mecklenburg	Charlotte	44.5	71.6	45	NC 24 (W.T. Harris Boulevard)	Signed as exits 45A (east) and 45B (west)
Mecklenburg	Charlotte	46.2	74.4	46	Mallard Creek Church Road	Signed northbound as exits 46A (east) and 46B (west)
Mecklenburg	Charlotte	47.5	76.4	48	I-485 to I-77 north – Huntersville, Matthews	Turbine interchange; I-77 not signed northbound; I-485 exit 30
Cabarrus	Concord	49.2	79.2	49	Bruton Smith Boulevard / Concord Mills Boulevard	To Concord Mills and Charlotte Motor Speedway
Cabarrus	Concord	51.8	83.4	52	Poplar Tent Road	Diverging diamond interchange
Cabarrus	Concord	53.6	86.3	54	George W. Liles Parkway / Kannapolis Parkway	To North Carolina Research Campus and Atrium Health Ballpark
Cabarrus	Concord	55.0	88.5	55	NC 73 – Concord, Huntersville	To Rowan-Cabarrus Community College South Campus; DDI
Cabarrus	Concord	58.0	93.3	58	US 29 / US 601 south – Kannapolis, Concord	Southern end of US 601 concurrency; to North Carolina Research Campus; DDI
Cabarrus	Kannapolis	59.9	96.4	60	Dale Earnhardt Boulevard / Copperfield Boulevard	Signed as exits 60A (Copperfield) and 60B (Dale Earnhardt) northbound
Cabarrus	Kannapolis	62.5	100.6	63	Lane Street – Kannapolis	
Rowan	Landis	65.0	104.6	65	Old Beatty Ford Road – Landis	Opened November 14, 2019
Rowan	China Grove	68.0	109.4	68	NC 152 to US 29 – China Grove, Rockwell	
Rowan	Salisbury	70.4	113.3	70	Webb Road	
Rowan	Salisbury	71.5	115.1	71	Peeler Road	
Rowan	Salisbury	72.3	116.4	72	Peach Orchard Road	
Rowan	Salisbury	73.7	118.6	74	Julian Road	
Rowan	Salisbury	74.5	119.9	75	US 601 north (Jake Alexander Boulevard)	Northern end of US 601 concurrency; to Rowan–Cabarrus CC North Campus
Rowan	Salisbury	76.0	122.3	76	US 52 south (Innes Street) – Albemarle, Salisbury	Southern end of US 52 concurrency; formerly signed as exits 76A (south) and 76B (north)
Rowan	East Spencer	79.0	127.1	79	Andrews Street – Spencer, East Spencer	
Rowan	Spencer	80.4	129.4	81	Long Ferry Road – Spencer	
Yadkin River		82.2	132.3	Yadkin River Veterans Memorial Bridge		
Davidson		82.7	133.1	82	US 29 south / US 70 west / NC 150 east – Spencer	Permanently closed as of April 2010
Davidson		83.1	133.7	83	NC 150	Permanently closed as of May 2013
Davidson		83.4	134.2	84	US 29 south / US 70 west to NC 150 – Spencer	Southern end of US 29/US 70 concurrency
Davidson		84.4	135.8	85	Clark Road	Permanently closed as of November 2012
Davidson		85.5	137.6	86	Belmont Road	
Davidson	Lexington	87.2	140.3	87	I-285 north / US 52 north (US 29 north / US 70 east) – Lexington, Winston-Salem	Northern end of US 29/US 52/US 70 concurrency; northbound exit and southbound entrance
Davidson	Lexington	88.0	141.6	88	NC 47 (Hargrave Road) to I-285 north / US 52 north	I-285/US 52 not signed northbound
Davidson	Lexington	91.1	146.6	91	NC 8 – Lexington, Southmont	
Davidson	Lexington	93.7	150.8	94	Old US 64	
Davidson	Lexington	96.0	154.5	96	US 64 – Asheboro, Lexington	
Davidson	Thomasville	101.5	163.3	102	Lake Road	
Davidson	Thomasville	103.4	166.4	103	NC 109 – Thomasville	
Randolph	Trinity	105.5	169.8	106	Finch Farm Road	
Randolph	Trinity	107.5	173.0	108	Hopewell Church Road – Trinity	
Randolph	Archdale	111.0	178.6	111	Main Street – Archdale, Downtown High Point	
Guilford	Archdale	112.7	181.4	113A	NC 62 – Archdale	Southbound access via C/D lanes originating from I-74 exit
Guilford	Archdale	113.4	182.5	113B-C	I-74 – Asheboro, Winston-Salem	Signed as exits 113B (east) and 113C (west); I-74 exit 75
Guilford	Greensboro	118.1	190.1	118	US 29 south – High Point	Southern end of US 29 concurrency
Guilford	Greensboro	119.5	192.3	119	Groometown Road to Grandover Parkway	Northbound exit and southbound entrance; US 29 exit 33A; I-73 exit 97C
Guilford	Greensboro	120.0	193.1	120A	US 29 north to I-73 south – Greensboro	Northern end of US 29 concurrency; northbound exit and southbound entrance
Guilford	Greensboro	120.4	193.8	120B	I-73 north / US 421 north – Winston-Salem, Martinsville	Western end of US 421 concurrency; signed as exit 121 southbound; I-73 exit 97B
Guilford	Greensboro	121.7	195.9	122	I-73 south / US 220 – Asheboro, Greensboro	Southbound exit and northbound entrance; signed as exits 122B (south) and 122C (north); I-73 exit 95A; US 220 exit 95B
Guilford	Greensboro	123.7	199.1	124	South Elm–Eugene Street	
Guilford	Greensboro	126.0	202.8	126A	US 421 south – Sanford	Eastern end of US 421 concurrency
Guilford	Greensboro	126.0	202.8	126B	Greensboro	
Guilford	Greensboro	128.2	206.3	128	Alamance Church Road	
Guilford	Greensboro	130.2	209.5	129	Youngs Mill Road	
Guilford	Greensboro	131.9	212.3	131	Northbound: I-785 north / I-840 west to I-40 west – Greensboro, Danville Southbound: I-40 west to I-785 north / I-840 west – Greensboro, Winston-Salem	Western end of I-40 overlap; southern terminus of I-785 and eastern terminus of I-840; I-40 exit 227
Guilford		132.6	213.4	132	Mount Hope Church Road	
Guilford	Whitsett	136.3	219.4	135	Rock Creek Dairy Road	
Guilford	Whitsett	138.6	223.1	138	NC 61 – Gibsonville	
Alamance	Burlington	141.5	227.7	140	University Drive – Elon	To Elon University
Alamance	Burlington	142.5	229.3	141	Huffman Mill Road	
Alamance	Burlington	144.2	232.1	143	NC 62 – Downtown Burlington, Alamance	
Alamance	Burlington	146.3	235.4	145	NC 49 – Downtown Burlington, Liberty	
Alamance	Graham	148.0	238.2	147	NC 87 – Graham, Pittsboro	
Alamance	Graham	149.0	239.8	148	NC 54 – Chapel Hill, Carrboro	
Alamance	Haw River	150.8	242.7	150	Jimmie Kerr Road – Haw River, Roxboro	
Alamance	Mebane	153.2	246.6	152	Trollingwood Road	
Alamance	Mebane	154.0	247.8	153	NC 119 – Mebane	
Alamance	Mebane	155.5	250.3	154	Mebane–Oaks Road – Mebane	
Orange		158.2	254.6	157	Buckhorn Road	
Orange	Efland	161.3	259.6	160	Mount Willing Road – Efland	
Orange	Efland	161.9	260.6	161	NC 86 Truck north to US 70 east	Western end of NC 86 Truck concurrency
Orange	Hillsborough	164.0	263.9	163	I-40 east – Raleigh	Eastern end of I-40 concurrency; I-40 exit 259
Orange	Hillsborough	165.2	265.9	164	Hillsborough	
Orange	Hillsborough	166.5	268.0	165	NC 86 Truck ends / NC 86 – Chapel Hill, Hillsborough	Eastern end of NC 86 Truck concurrency
Orange	Eno	170.8	274.9	170	US 70 west / US 70 Bus. east to NC 751 – Duke University	Southern end of US 70 concurrency; to Bennett Place
Durham	Durham	173.3	278.9	172	NC 147 south – Downtown Durham, Research Triangle Park	Northbound exit and southbound entrance; to North Carolina Central University
Durham	Durham	174.2	280.3	173	Cole Mill Road	
Durham	Durham	174.7	281.2	174A	US 15 south / US 501 south to US 70 Bus. / NC 751 / Hillsborough Road – Chapel Hill	Southern end of US 15/US 501 concurrency; southbound exit and northbound entrance
Durham	Durham	175.3	282.1	174B	Hillandale Road	Signed as Exit 174 northbound
Durham	Durham	176.0	283.2	175	NC 157 (Guess Road)	To NC School of Science & Math and Duke Homestead
Durham	Durham	177.2	285.2	176	US 501 north (Duke Street) / Gregson Street – Roxboro	Northern end of US 501 concurrency; signed northbound as exits 176A (Gregson Street) and 176B (Roxboro)
Durham	Durham	178.2	286.8	177	US 15 Bus. south / US 501 Bus. (Roxboro Street) / NC 55 east (Avondale Drive)	To North Carolina Central University
Durham	Durham	179.2	288.4	178	I-885 south / US 70 east – RDU Airport, Raleigh	Eastern end of US 70 concurrency; I-885 exit 13; northern terminus of I-885
Durham	Durham	180.6	290.6	179	E. Club Boulevard	
Durham	Durham	181.3	291.8	180	Glenn School Road	
Durham	Gorman	183.0	294.5	182	Red Mill Road	
Durham	Gorman	184.5	296.9	183	Redwood Road	
Granville		186.7	300.5	186	US 15 north – Creedmoor, Butner	Northern end of US 15 concurrency; signed northbound as exits 186A (US 15) and 186B (Butner)
Granville	Butner	189.7	305.3	189	Gate Two Road – Butner	
Granville	Butner	192.0	309.0	191	NC 56 – Butner, Creedmoor	
Granville		202.8	326.4	202	US 15 – Oxford, Clarksville	
Granville	Oxford	205.1	330.1	204	NC 96 – Oxford	
Granville	Oxford	207.5	333.9	206	US 158 – Oxford, Roxboro	
Vance		210.6	338.9	209	Poplar Creek Road	To Vance–Granville Community College
Vance	Henderson	213.0	342.8	212	Ruin Creek Road	
Vance	Henderson	214.0	344.4	213	US 158 Byp. west / Dabney Drive	Western end of US 158 concurrency
Vance	Henderson	215.5	346.8	214	NC 39 – Downtown Henderson	
Vance	Henderson	216.4	348.3	215	US 158 Byp. east / Parham Road	Eastern end of US 158 concurrency
Vance	Henderson	218.0	350.8	217	Satterwhite Point Road	To Satterwhite Point
Vance	Henderson	219.0	352.4	218	US 1 south – Raleigh	Southbound exit and northbound entrance
Vance	Middleburg	221.0	355.7	220	US 1 / US 158 / Flemingtown Road – Norlina	
Warren	Manson	224.5	361.3	223	Manson-Drewry Road	
Warren		226.8	365.0	226	Ridgeway-Drewry Road	
Warren		229.7	369.7	229	Oine Road	
Warren		233.8	376.3	233	US 1 / US 401 – Warrenton, Louisburg	Northern terminus of US 401
Warren		234.6	377.6		I-85 north – Petersburg	Continuation into Virginia
1.000 mi = 1.609 km; 1.000 km = 0.621 mi: Closed/former; Concurrency terminus; Incomplete access

== Related routes ==
There are four auxiliary routes and one business loop in the state. I-285 runs concurrently with US 52 connecting I-85 to I-40 in the Winston-Salem metropolitan area. I-485 forms a beltway around Charlotte, serving as a bypass for I-85 and I-77. I-785 serves as a spur route, forming a portion of the eastern part of the Greensboro Urban Loop and in the future will connect to Danville, Virginia. I-885 connects I-85 to I-40 in the Durham area.

I-85 Bus. served as a partial controlled-access highway, bypassing Lexington, Thomasville, and going through central High Point, along with an extended stretch bypassing downtown Greensboro. The route was decommissioned in 2019, with signage for I-85 Bus. remaining until 2024, however.

== See also ==
- Crowders Mountain State Park
- Eno River State Park
- Haw River
- Kerr Lake
- Lake Wylie
- Northgate Mall

Interstate 85
Previous state: South Carolina	North Carolina	Next state: Virginia
