= R. Samuel Hunt =

American politician

Rector Samuel Hunt III (born September 1, 1941) is an American businessman and retired politician. A Democrat, he served in the North Carolina House of Representatives from 1985 to 1992, representing the 25th district. He served as Secretary of the North Carolina Department of Transportation from 1993 to 1995.

== Early life ==
Rector Samuel Hunt III was born on September 1, 1941, in Burlington, North Carolina, United States to Rector S. Hunt Jr. and Mildred Rachel Hunt. He attended Williams High School from 1955 to 1959 and graduated from Eastern Carolina University in 1965. He served in the United States Army from 1966 to 1969 and in the Army Reserves in 1970 at the rank of first lieutenant. The following year he and his father opened Hunt Electrical Supply, a business which was eventually expanded to encompass nine stores. He married Vicky Silek and had a son with her.

== Political career ==
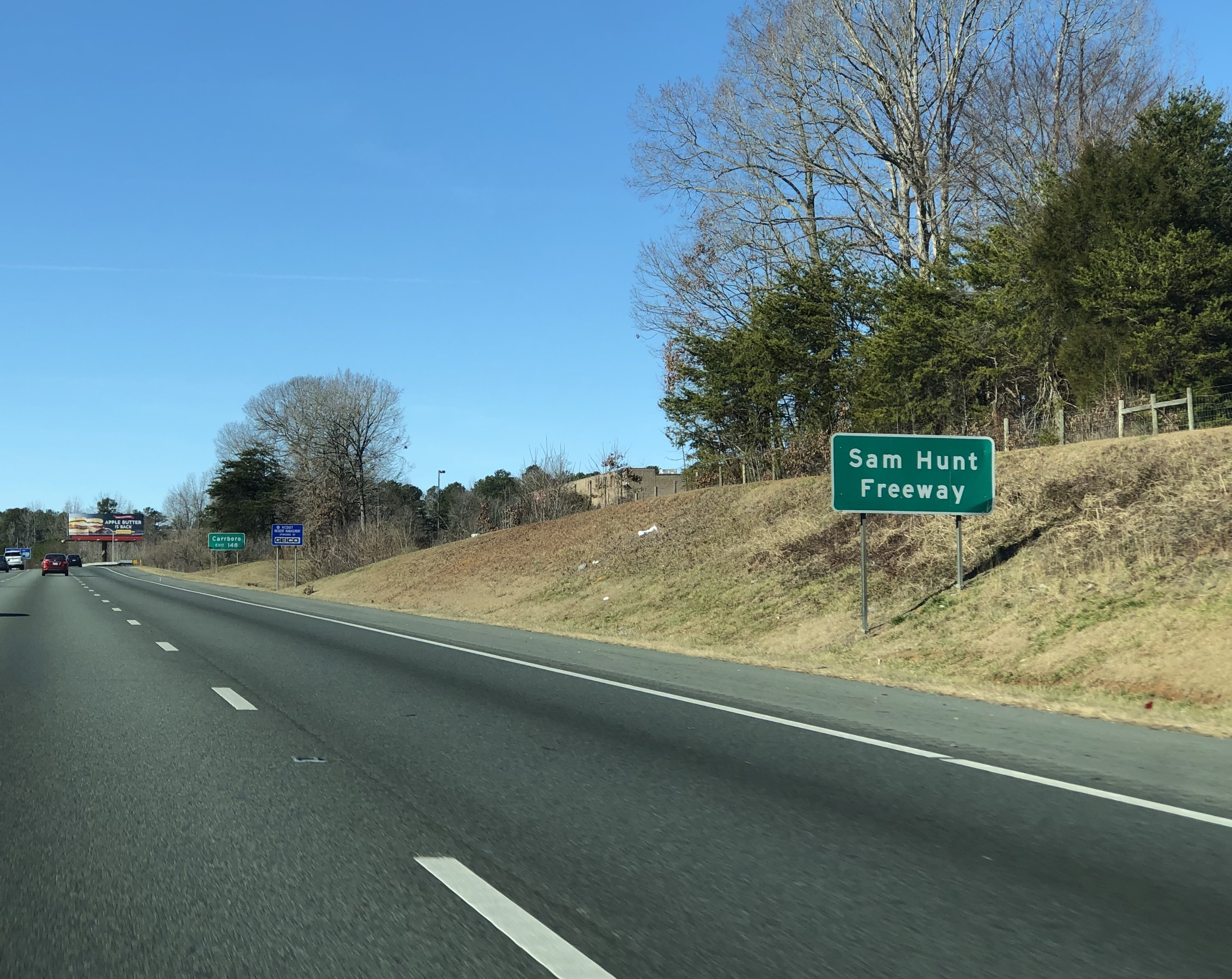
Sam Hunt Freeway

Hunt is a member of the Democratic Party. He was appointed to the North Carolina House of Representatives seat for the 25th district, representing Alamance, Rockingham, and a portion of Stokes counties, on November 7, 1985, to replace Tim McDowell. He served until 1992. During his tenure he sponsored bills to raise the highway speed limit 65 miles per hour and create the North Carolina Highway Trust Fund. In 1987 he helped block efforts to create a hazardous waste facility in Alamance County. In January 1989 he joined with Republicans and dissident Democrats to unseat House Speaker Liston B. Ramsey and replace him with Josephus L. Mavretic. On January 23, Mavretic appointed him chairman of the new House Infrastructure Committee. He supported Dan Blue's bid for the speakership in 1990.

Hunt retired from the legislature in 1992 to attend to his businesses due to an economic recession. He raised money for Democratic gubernatorial candidate Jim Hunt (of no relation) that year. Jim Hunt won, and upon taking office in January appointed him Secretary of the North Carolina Department of Transportation. During his tenure the department launched the Piedmont Service, a passenger rail connection between Raleigh and Charlotte. He left the department in 1995 to serve as the chairman of the governor's reelection committee.

== Later life ==
In 1997 a section of Interstate 40 was named the Sam Hunt Freeway. In 2002 he and his wife raised private donations to build an animal shelter in Burlington and he lobbied the Burlington City Council to appropriate additional funds for the purpose. In his later years Hunt purchased a home in Palm Beach, Florida and split his time between there and Burlington.

== Works cited ==
- North Carolina Manual. Raleigh: North Carolina Secretary of State. 1989. OCLC 436873840.
