= Wil-Cox Bridge =

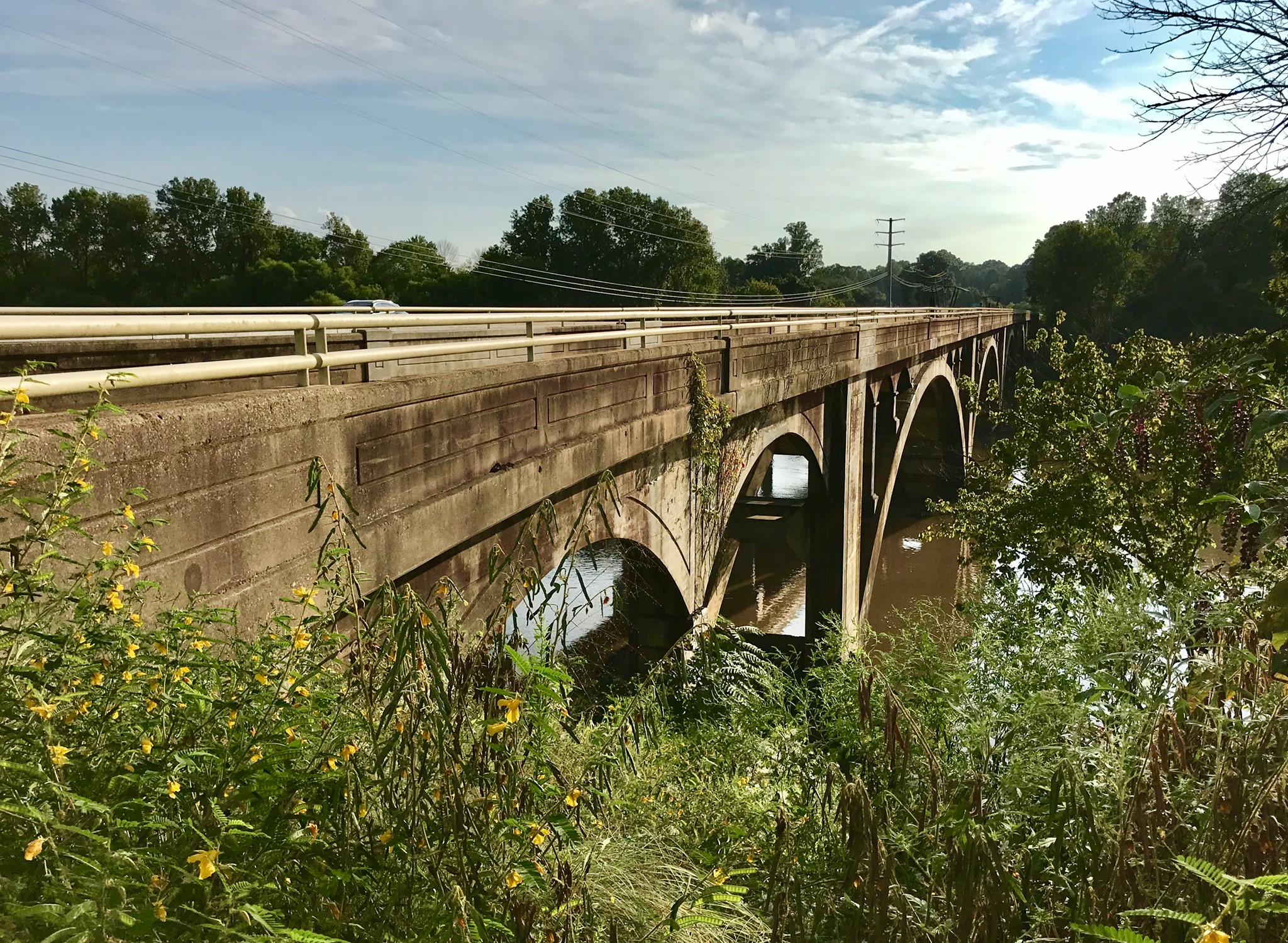
- Coordinates: 35.72276°N 80.39155°W
- Carries: Pedestrians
- Crosses: Yadkin River
- Locale: Rowan and Davidson Counties
- Owner: Davidson County
- Maintained by: Davidson County

Characteristics
- Material: Concrete
- Total length: 1,298.9 feet (395.9 m)
- Width: 23 feet (7.0 m)

History
- Construction start: 1922
- Construction end: 1924
- Construction cost: $212 thousand
- Opened: 1924
- Replaces: Piedmont Toll Bridge

Location
- Interactive map of Wil-Cox Bridge

The Wil-Cox Bridge is a historic concrete arch pedestrian bridge spanning the Yadkin River between Rowan and Davidson counties in North Carolina. The bridge formerly carried two lanes of US 29/US 70/NC 150, but is now part of the Davidson County Greenway system and Yadkin River Park.

The bridge's location is on a popular trading path that has been used for centuries. The mail route from Washington, D.C. to New Orleans crossed the Yadkin at Trading Ford. Louis Beard built the first bridge, a toll bridge, in 1818. A later toll bridge went up in 1899 using the same piers.

== History as a highway bridge ==
The bridge was completed in 1924 at a cost of $212,000, is 20-foot-wide (6.1 m), and consists of seven open spandrel arch spans. The Wil-Cox Bridge, named for highway commissioners W.E. Wilkinson of Charlotte and Elwood Cox of High Point, is one of only six of its type built in the state, and at 1,299 feet (396 m) the longest.

A steel girder bridge built in 1951 as a companion to the Wil-Cox Bridge carried the northbound US 29 lanes and eastbound US 70 lanes but was closed in 2012. A pair of bridges on neighboring Interstate 85 (I-85) went up in 1957 and were replaced by a new pair of bridges in 2012.

As of 2001, the city of Salisbury wanted to see the Wil-Cox Bridge preserved. When the 1951 US 29/US 70 bridge is replaced, this bridge would no longer be used for traffic. Until early 2009, the state was planning to demolish the bridge, but preservationists wanted it saved as a pedestrian bridge, "a regional historical artifact" to become part of a planned greenway system. Davidson County decided to consider taking ownership and responsibility for maintenance, with the state giving the county the $2.5 million estimated cost of demolition. In March 2010, Davidson County voted to take the bridge, though one opponent pointed out that preserving the bridge would be more of a tourism advantage to Rowan County, which did not want the bridge.

On April 8, 2010, the NCDOT closed the Wil-Cox Bridge due to safety concerns. Inspectors discovered the problems in December 2008, but the closure of the bridge was expected to take place in a few years once the replacement I-85 bridges were ready. Delays on the I-85 bridges meant these problems became serious enough to require repairs to keep the bridge in service.

On July 21, 2010, Pat Ivey of the NCDOT said the bridge would be used as a detour during construction. The NC DOT spent $3 million on repairs. The work was underway as of February 2011.

By April 15, 2011, upgrading on the bridge was halfway to completion. A month later, workers were using a technique called "shotcrete", using a hose to spray concrete into those spaces where damaged concrete had been removed.

On September 1, 2011, work on Wil-Cox Bridge was complete, allowing the bridge to be used as a detour during replacement of the U.S. 29-70 bridge. The US 29/US 70 bridge built in 1951 closed April 17, 2012, with the new bridge scheduled to open by fall 2013. A portion of the temporary work bridge from the I-85 project was used to build the new bridge.

Only cars going south could use the Wil-Cox Bridge until August 2012, when changes were made to allow traffic to go both ways. One-way traffic had a negative effect on businesses in Spencer. As of September 2013, the new bridge was expected to be complete by year end, at which time more repairs were to be made to the old bridge. Traffic moved to the new bridge on February 7, 2014.

== Tourist attraction ==
Davidson County commissioners voted unanimously August 25, 2015 to take over the bridge. The state gave Davidson County the $2.5 million that would have been used for demolition, to be used for "preservation activities". Commissioners appointed a steering committee in September to work on attracting tourists.

=== Historical attractions ===
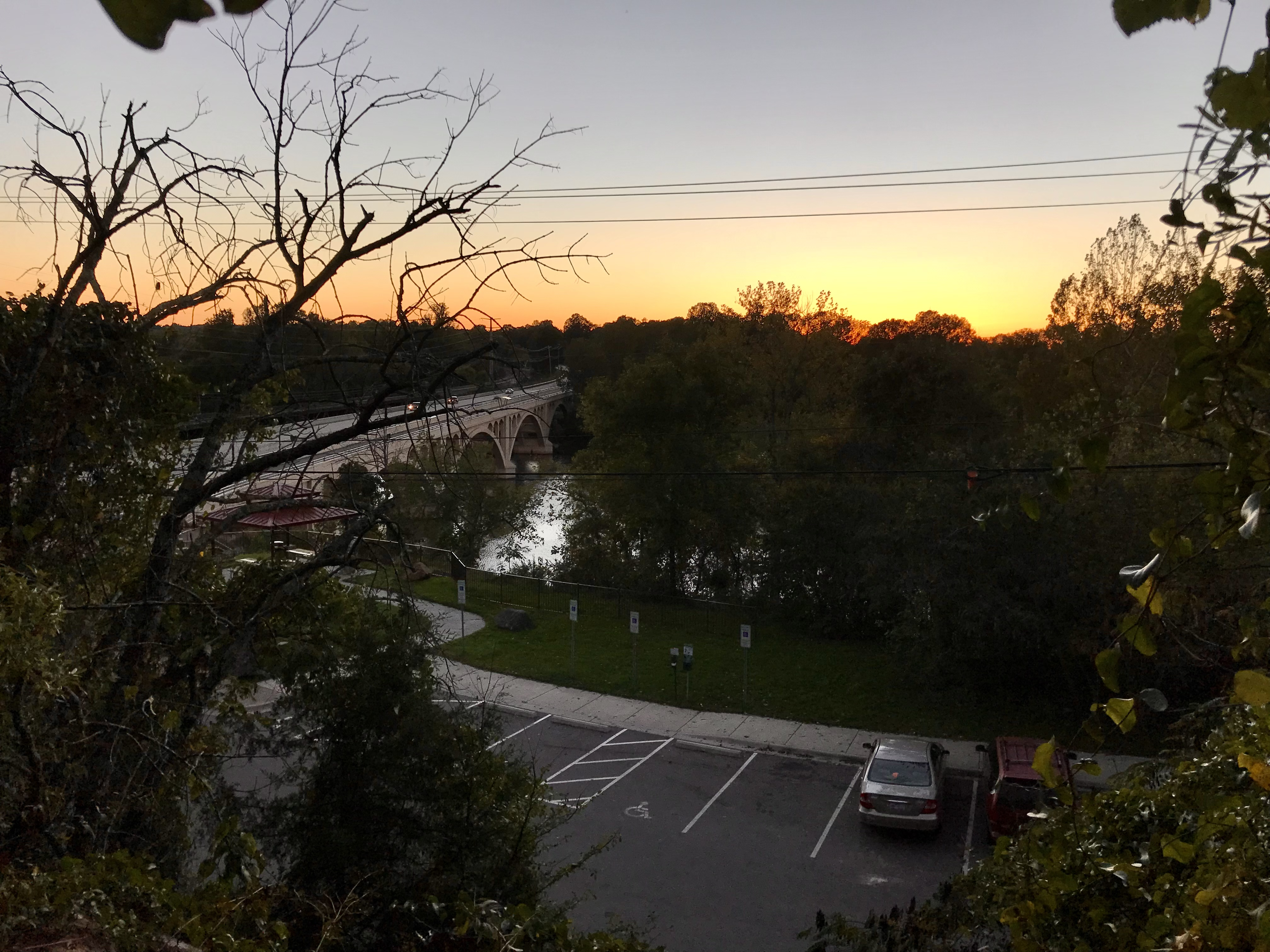
Wil-Cox Bridge (left) as seen from York bluff, the site of a Civil War-era fort

Tourist attractions in the area included Trading Ford and the former site of the Civil War fort Camp Yadkin, also called Fort York, from where General George Stoneman was defeated in the last Confederate victory in North Carolina, when he tried to destroy the important railway bridge across the Yadkin River on April 12, 1865. So it was the location of one of the final military actions of the Civil War. Dr. Max Walser, chair of the Wil-Cox Bridge/Fort York Steering Committee, said in 2018 that Native Americans first lived in the area 12,000 years ago, and that Spanish settlers under Juan Pardo attempted to start a colony around 1567.

==== Indigenous settlements ====
Explorer John Lederer visited Cheraw at Trading Ford in 1670. John Lawson described a Saponi settlement where Native Americans crossed the river. Rowan County was formed in 1753, and Salisbury in 1755, because this was the location of a popular trading path. During the American Revolution, Nathanael Greene crossed the river ahead of Charles Cornwallis, who could not follow because of flooding from a storm. Historians considered this event to be important to the Americans in the war. At a battle re-enactment at the Old Stone House on June 11, 2022, Rowan Museum executive director Aaron Kepley said, "If the Yadkin River had not flooded when it did, we may all still be British."

=== Developments ===
As of September 2013, the Tourism Recreation Investment Partnership for Davidson County Foundation was working on plans for the Wil-Cox Bridge, which was already part of the Daniel Boone Heritage Canoe Trail opened earlier in 2013.

Davidson County commissioners agreed on August 23, 2016 to buy 13.82 acres at Fort York, which along with the bridge could attract tourists. The $137,500 purchase from LandTrust of Central North Carolina became official with the deed transfer ceremony November 10, 2016. The Wil-Cox Bridge/Fort York Steering Committee had its first meeting October 14, 2015.

A groundbreaking took place July 30, 2018. Yadkin River Park held a ribbon cutting June 21, 2019. Plans call for a connection to the Carolina Thread Trail, and eventually trails will be built to Boone's Cave Park and other locations.

Davidson County and Friends of Rowan announced a $100,000 gift on March 30, 2021, and Friends of Rowan announced an additional $50,000. This money would go for improvements to the park including a dog park, sidewalks and parking. Several million dollars would be needed, however, for a visitor center and playground, and possibly a museum. The town of Spencer planned improvements on the Rowan County side, including a trail with benches and parking. The North Carolina Department of Transportation planned to provide unneeded right-of-way for this purpose. Additional development in Rowan County was planned on the former North Carolina Finishing site, purchased a year earlier by Waterford Funding and requiring $3.5 million in cleanup. 600 people a day already visited the park in Davidson County, and repairs were still needed on the bridge.

== Other bridges ==
The North Carolina Railroad Yadkin River Bridges were built in 1906 and 1919 and each contain four spans of Warren deck truss.
