= GARVEE =

Grant Anticipation Revenue Vehicle, or GARVEE, is a type of bond or similar financing method issued by a state or state infrastructure bank under the guidelines of the National Highway System Designation Act of 1995, eventually made permanent in section 122 of Title 23 of the United States Code. States must repay the bonds using federal funds expected to be received in the future. Some financing under this plan is referred to using the term Grant Anticipation Note (GAN).

Section 122 states "an eligible debt financing instrument is a bond, note, certificate, mortgage, lease, or other debt financing instrument issued by a State or political subdivision of a State or a public authority, the proceeds of which are used to fund a project eligible for assistance under Title 23."

GARVEE bonds may be used for major projects receiving federal funding. They do not guarantee that the federal government will provide the expected financing, and they are not guaranteed by the federal government. Details of projects must be sent to the appropriate Federal Highway Administration (FHWA) division office to make sure the project follows federal rules for eligibility. The FHWA approves only the projects, not the financing method. The state may also elect to use methods other than federal funding for repayment, and it may receive federal funds through a trustee or depository.

Eligible costs for projects may include interest, retirement of principal, costs for issuing bonds, and other incidental costs which must be approved. Bond proceeds not used for projects may be used to pay principal and interest, but they may not be reimbursed. The FHWA may also repay a debt service reserve fund used to pay bondholders when federal funds come later than needed. Reimbursement of a surety provider for interest and principal is also eligible; interest and penalties associated with payments to surety providers are not.
