= ARMC =

ARMC may refer to:

- Alamance Regional Medical Center
- ARMC5
- ARMC6
- Arrowhead Regional Medical Center
