= Watauga Medical Center =

- UNC Health

Geography
- Location: Boone, North Carolina, United States
- Coordinates: 36.19847325846292°N 81.65097542817755°W

Organization
- Type: General, Specialist
- Network: UNC Health

Services
- Beds: 117

Links
- Website: www.unchealthappalachian.org/locations/profile/watauga-medical-center/
- Lists: Hospitals in North Carolina

Watauga Medical Center is a not-for-profit hospital located in Boone, North Carolina. The hospital is licensed for 117 beds. It opened in 1967. The hospital was previously under Appalachian Regional Healthcare System (ARHS). ARHS and Watauga Medical Center changed affiliation to UNC Health in 2022.

== See also ==
- List of hospitals in North Carolina
