= UNC Lineberger Comprehensive Cancer Center =

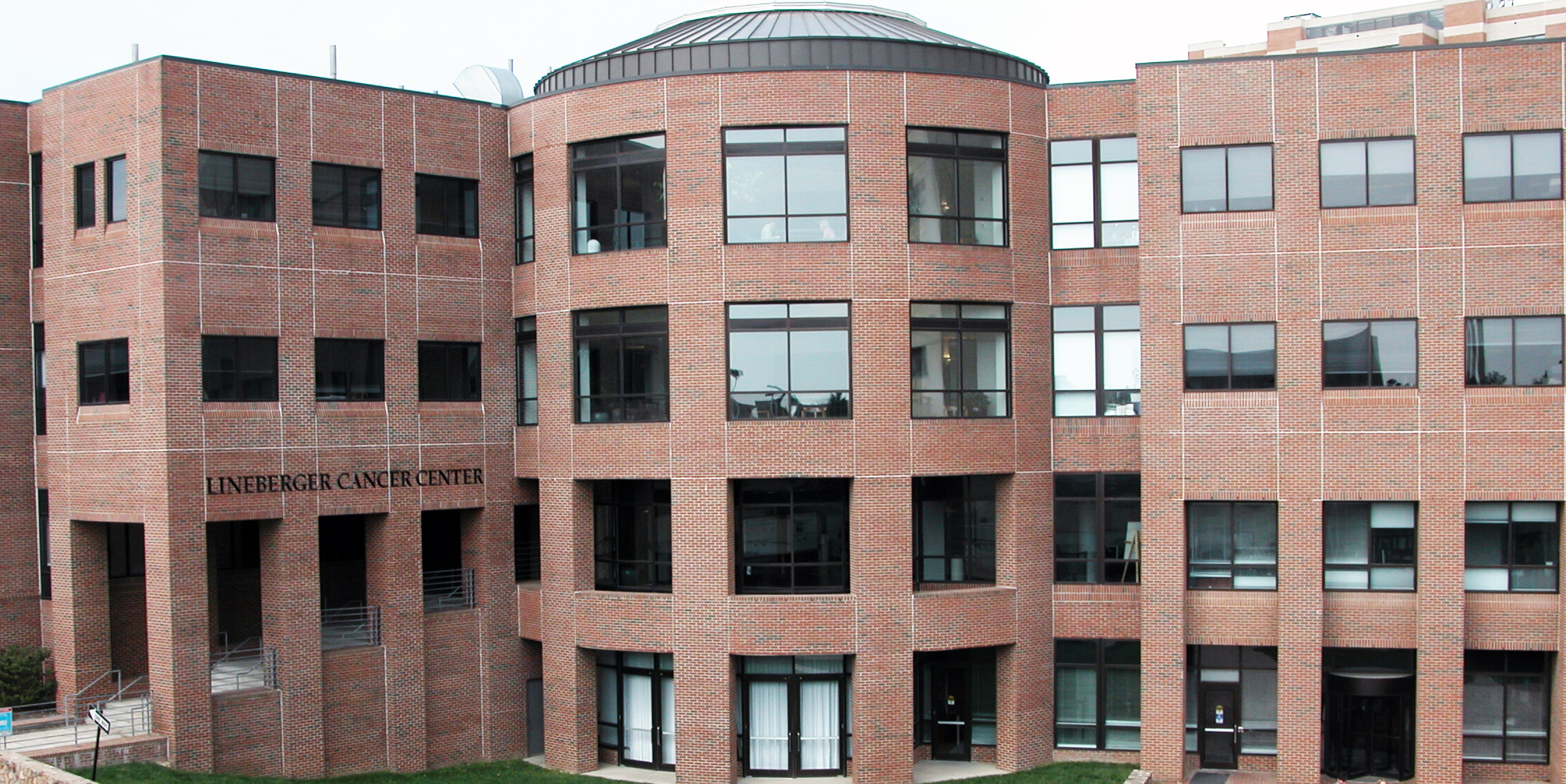
- NC Lineberger Comprehensive Cancer Center

Geography
- Location: Chapel Hill, North Carolina, United States
- Coordinates: 35.903°N 79.0534°W

Organization
- Type: Specialist
- Affiliated university: University of North Carolina School of Medicine, School of Nursing, School of Dentistry, the Gillings School of Global Public Health, Eshelman School of Pharmacy, and the College of Arts and Sciences

Services
- Speciality: Oncology

History
- Opened: 1975

Links
- Website: www.unclineberger.org
- Lists: Hospitals in North Carolina

The UNC Lineberger Comprehensive Cancer Center is a cancer research and treatment center at the University of North Carolina at Chapel Hill. One of 52 National Cancer Institute-designated comprehensive cancer centers in the United States, its clinical base is the N.C. Cancer Hospital, part of the UNC Health Care system. UNC Lineberger is the only public NCI-designated comprehensive cancer center in the state of North Carolina. The current director is H. Shelton Earp III who succeeded current NCI director Norman Sharpless.

== History and name ==
UNC Lineberger Comprehensive Cancer Center was established in 1975 with Joseph S. Pagano, Professor of Medicine and Microbiology at the University of North Carolina School of Medicine, as its founding director.

It was named after the Lineberger family of Belmont, North Carolina, whose Lineberger Foundation provided the core funding for the center's first dedicated research and administrative building, completed in 1984.

The cancer center was previously led by Norman Sharpless, who was appointed to the role in 2014. Sharpless, an expert in molecular therapeutics, attended the University of North Carolina as both an undergraduate, receiving the Morehead-Cain Scholarship, and as a medical student. In 2017, he was nominated and confirmed as the director of the National Cancer Institute. H. Shelton Earp III, who served as director of the UNC Lineberger Comprehensive Cancer Center prior to Sharpless, agreed to serve as interim director after Sharpless left for the NCI. Earp was appointed on a permanent status in 2018.

The center's clinical base, the N.C. Cancer Hospital, was completed in 2009. In the summer of 2007, the North Carolina General Assembly established the University Cancer Research Fund (UCRF) to support cancer research at UNC Lineberger and the North Carolina Cancer Hospital with annual funding of $50 million.

== Members and research ==
UNC Lineberger's members come from over 40 departments at the University of North Carolina at Chapel Hill, including UNC-Chapel Hill's School of Medicine, School of Nursing, School of Dentistry, the Gillings School of Global Public Health, Eshelman School of Pharmacy, and the College of Arts and Sciences. The Center has nine formal scientific programs: Cancer Cell Biology, Immunology, Molecular Therapeutics, Virology, Cancer Genetics, Clinical Research, Cancer Prevention and Control, and Cancer Epidemiology. In 2006, its members held over $170 million in annual research and training grants, including $48 million in NCI funding.

=== Notable members ===
- Joseph DeSimone, American chemist and recipient of the 2008 Lemelson-MIT Prize
- Aziz Sancar, Turkish-American biochemist and Winner of the 2015 Nobel Prize in Chemistry
