= Pardee Hospital =

- UNC Health

Geography
- Location: Hendersonville, North Carolina, United States
- Coordinates: 35.321763°N 82.467183°W

Organization
- Affiliated university: UNC Health

Services
- Beds: 201

Links
- Website: www.pardeehospital.org
- Lists: Hospitals in North Carolina

Margaret R. Pardee Memorial Hospital, commonly known as Pardee Hospital, is a private, not-for-profit community hospital located in Hendersonville, North Carolina. Patton Memorial Hospital was the first hospital in Hendersonville, opening in 1913. The hospital moved to its current location and changed names on November 15, 1953. In 2011, the hospital established an affiliation agreement with UNC Health.
