= UNC Health Rex =

Coordinates: 35.8175°N 78.7030°W

UNC Rex Healthcare
- UNC Health Care

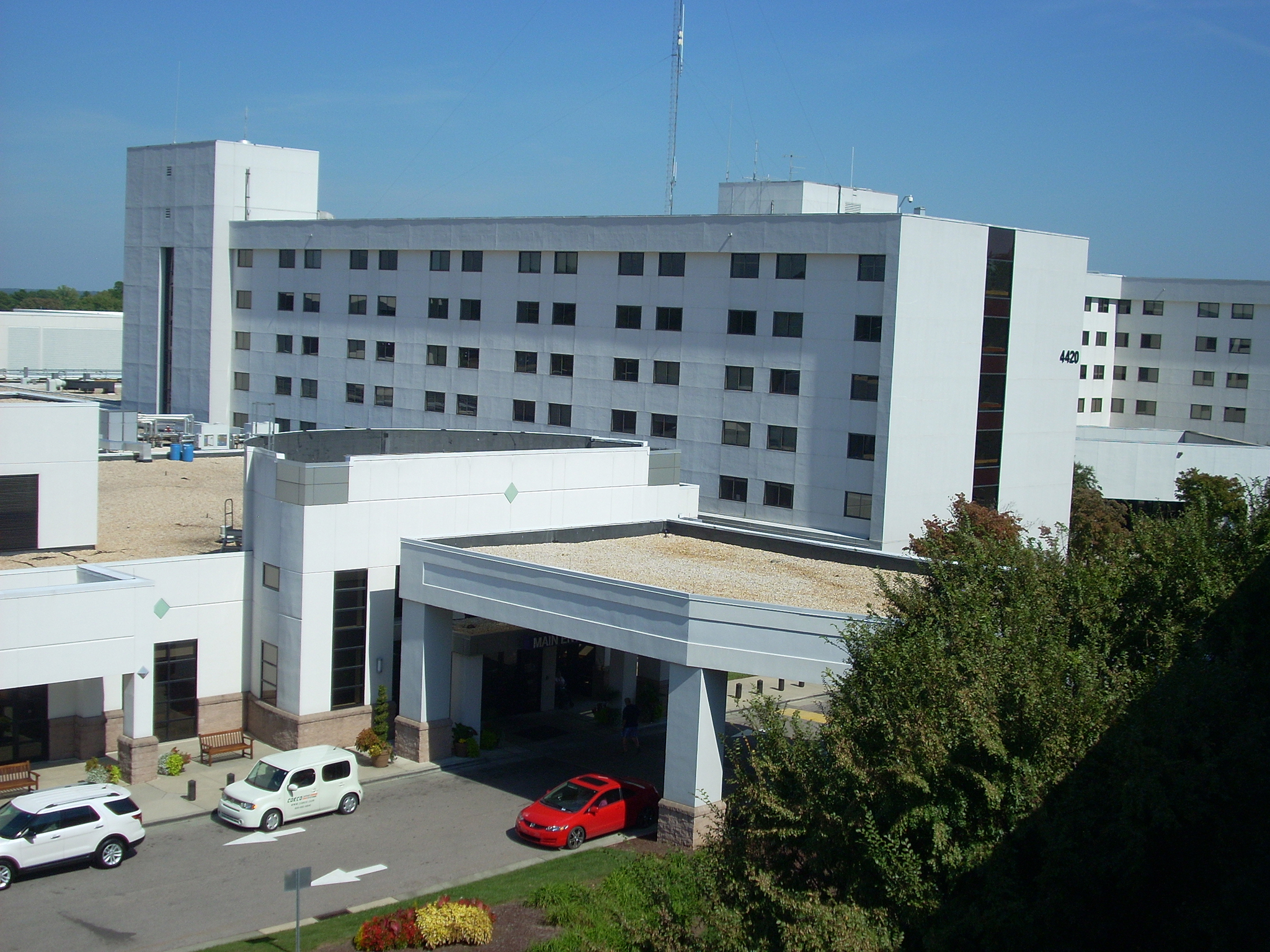
- The main entrance at Rex Hospital

Geography
- Location: 4420 Lake Boone Trail, Raleigh, North Carolina, United States

Organization
- Type: General
- Affiliated university: University of North Carolina

Services
- Beds: 665

Helipads
- Helipad: Yes

History
- Founded: 1894

Links
- Website: rexhealth.com
- Lists: Hospitals in North Carolina
- Other links: UNC Health Care

UNC Rex Hospital is a general hospital located in Raleigh, North Carolina. It is the capital city's oldest hospital, founded by a bequest from John T. Rex (1771–1839), a local tanner, planter, and owner of enslaved families, and named in his honor. Originally located on what is now Dorothea Dix campus, and later on St. Mary's Street, Rex is now located in west Raleigh at the corner of Blue Ridge Road and Lake Boone Trail. Rex Health Care's services include oncology, heart and vascular, surgical services (including bariatric, heartburn, GI, orthopedic, neuro, and spinal), rehabilitation, emergency department, urgent care, women's services, and wound healing.

Rex is a member of the UNC Health Care system, a non-profit integrated health care system, owned by the state of North Carolina and based in Chapel Hill, North Carolina.

Rex is located just 2 miles from the Lenovo Center, and is the official healthcare provider of the Carolina Hurricanes and NC State Wolfpack.

== Statistics ==
- 2013 Patient Statistics:
- Inpatient Admissions: 30,778 (includes births)
- Births: 5,292
- Surgeries: 30,628
- Emergency Department Visits: 57,944

== Locations ==
In addition to the main hospital in Raleigh, Rex Health Care has locations throughout Wake County. These include an outpatient rehabilitation and fitness center in Garner, outpatient facilities in Cary, Holly Springs (Holly Springs facility), and Wake Forest (Wakefield facility), and outpatient diagnostics in Cary, Wakefield, and Knightdale. Apex also has a rehabilitation and nursing care center that is run by Rex. In December 2021, Rex opened a new facility in Holly Springs offering multiple services.

== Awards and recognitions ==
Rex has been named one of the top 100 hospitals in the country by Thomson (2008) and named one of the Best Places to Work in Healthcare by Modern Healthcare (2008). In 2014, Rex was recognized as the hospital with the best patient interactions in the state of North Carolina. In a study done by an independent company, Axial Exchange, Rex was ranked highest based on readmissions, patient satisfaction, and self care tools and education. In 2010, it was named a Bariatric Center of Excellence by the American Society for Bariatric Surgery. Rex was the first hospital in the Triangle, and one of only 10 in North Carolina to receive Magnet Recognition, which places Rex nurses among the top two percent in the country.
