= AdventHealth Weaverville =

- AdventHealth

Geography
- Location: Weaverville, North Carolina, United States

Organization
- Care system: Private hospital
- Type: General hospital
- Religious affiliation: Seventh-day Adventist Church

History
- Constructed: March 26, 2026

Links
- Lists: Hospitals in North Carolina

AdventHealth Weaverville is a non-profit hospital campus under construction in Weaverville, North Carolina for AdventHealth. Construction on the medical facility had been delayed, due to Mission Health filing a lawsuit to stop it from being built. Their appeal was denied by the North Carolina Supreme Court, ending a three-year court battle with AdventHealth, allowing for construction to begin in March 2026.

== History ==
=== Pre-history ===
On April 20, 2022, AdventHealth announced that it would apply with the state of North Carolina on June 15, to construct a hospital with 67 beds in Buncombe County, North Carolina. On November 22, AdventHealth was approved to build the new hospital by the North Carolina Department of Health and Human Services. AdventHealth received 4,000 letters of support from government and community leaders in the county and surrounding counties.

Mission Health had applied with the state to add the 67 beds to its hospital in Asheville, their request for the expansion at Mission Hospital was denied. Also Novant Health had applied to build a hospital in Buncombe County, their bid was also denied by the North Carolina Department of Health and Human Services. They both sued North Carolina over its decision to choose AdventHealth. Later Novant Health dropped its lawsuit against the state in 2023.

On February 21, 2024, AdventHealth purchased 25.45 acres (10.30 ha) between U.S. Route 25/U.S. Route 70 and Interstate 26 in Weaverville, North Carolina for $7.5 million. Originally it had planned to build in Candler, North Carolina. On March 19, AdventHealth announced that it would build its hospital in Weaverville for about $254.1 million, even thou it did not have approval from a judge. At the annual North Carolina State Medical Facilities Plan, it was announced that the Asheville metropolitan area needed 26 more acute beds. AdventHealth after hearing the announcement applied for a certificate of need for the additional 26 beds. This would increase the number of beds for AdventHealth Weaverville to 93 beds once built.

On May 10, a judge from the North Carolina Office of Administrative Hearings, rejected the lawsuit by Mission Health a subsidiary of HCA Healthcare against North Carolina over its decision of AdventHealth. They were given thirty days to appeal the decision.

In late November, the hospital networks certificate of need for the additional 26 beds was approved by the state, rejecting the certificate of need requests by Mission Health and Novant Health. On December 20, Mission Health appealed to the North Carolina Office of Administrative Hearings, claiming that the additional 26 beds should have never been given to AdventHealth. The reason why they are fighting is because they want to keep the beds they had given up after closing Asheville Specialty Hospital, and also Mission Hospital is over capacity.

On May 9, 2025, AdventHealth announced that it would apply for a certificate of need for an additional 129 bed for AdventHealth Weaverville. This would increase the number of beds for the future hospital to 222, making it the second-largest hospital in western North Carolina. In June, the North Carolina Court of Appeals upheld AdventHealth's certificate of need for the 67 beds. In early July, Novant Health announced that it would also apply for the 129 beds for a new hospital. In late July, attorneys for Mission Hospital appealed to the North Carolina Supreme Court for a temporary stay of the court of appeals ruling. On July 26, in response to the request the court approved the temporary stay. On August 1, AdventHealth asked the North Carolina Supreme Court not to except the case, since they consider Mission Health's attempt to overturn the certificate of need for the sixty-seven beds to be futile and not appropriate for the court to review. While Mission Health wants the court to clear up contradictory and confusing rulings.

In early October, Mission Health announced that it would apply for the 129 beds; and also UNC Health announced that it to would apply for the beds for a new hospital in Asheville. On December 15, AdventHealth announced that the North Carolina Supreme Court had refused to hear the appeal of Mission Health, paving the way for AdventHealth to have its first phase of AdventHealth Weaverville built. Due to the delay the only work done on the site in 2025, was land development and the demolition of a house. The hospital could create about 1,600 jobs when it opens.

=== 2026–present ===
On March 26, 2026, there was a groundbreaking for the medical facility, and in attendance was Josh Stein. Once complete the hospital will be seven-stories, while its medical office building will be three-stories and 75,000 square foot (7,000 m^{2}). The following companies were hired to make the hospital a reality: HKS, Inc., Brasfield & Gorrie and RMF Engineering. On the following day the North Carolina Department of Health and Human Services rejected the certificate of need requests by AdventHealth and UNC Health. It instead approved 95 beds for Mission Hospital and gave Novant Health permission to build a 35-bed hospital in Arden, North Carolina. AdventHealth and UNC Health had until April 27 to appeal the decision.

After hearing the decision by the North Carolina Department of Health and Human Services, Julie Mayfield told Asheville Watchdog saying: "I was shocked, and then puzzled, why the state would award [Mission] 95 more beds when they can't seem to safely manage the beds that they have. It simply makes no sense."

On April 23, 2026, the hospital networks both appealed the decision to the North Carolina Office of Administrative Hearings. At the annual North Carolina State Medical Facilities Plan, it was announced that the Asheville metropolitan area needed 92 more acute beds. Soon after AdventHealth, Mission Health, UNC Health applied with the Department of Health and Human Services for the beds. AdventHealth wants to add the beds to its medical facility under construction in Weaverville, Mission Health wants to add them to its hospital in Asheville, and UNC Health wants the beds so they can build UNC Health West Medical Center. And Novant Health also applied, but only for 20 beds for its medical facility in Arden. In May, Buncombe County supported AdventHealth for the 92 acute beds, and later they had changed their mind and were supporting UNC Health in August. On August 19, at a meeting for the 92 acute beds the public were 100 percent against Mission Hospital from receiving anymore beds.

== See also ==
- List of Seventh-day Adventist hospitals
