= Moses H. Cone =

Moses H. Cone may refer to:

- Moses H. Cone Memorial Park
- Moses H. Cone Memorial Hospital
- Moses Cone Health System
- Moses H. Cone, one of the founders of Cone Mills Corporation
