= UNC Health Blue Ridge =

Geography
- Location: Morganton, Western North Carolina, North Carolina, United States
- Coordinates: 35.726647°N 81.6545336°W

Organization
- Type: Community
- Network: UNC Health

Services
- Emergency department: Level III Trauma Center
- Beds: 305

Helipads
- Helipad: 92NC

History
- Former names: Grace Hospital; Carolinas HealthCare System Blue Ridge
- Opened: August 1, 1906

Links
- Lists: Hospitals in North Carolina

UNC Health Blue Ridge is a not-for-profit hospital located in Morganton, North Carolina, United States, and serving Burke County, North Carolina. The hospital anchors UNC Health Blue Ridge system of healthcare providers that includes other facilities such as Valdese, Grace Ridge Retirement Community, Phifer Wellness Center and other physician practices.

== History ==
Grace Hospital began as a mission of the Episcopal Church. In 1901, Walter Hughson and his wife, Mary Herbert Hughson, moved to Morganton where Hughson served as rector of Grace Episcopal Church. The church hired Maria Purdon Allen from Philadelphia in 1903 as visiting nurse to the missions. After Allen wrote an article in a national church publication, “The Spirit of the Missions,” about the need for a hospital in the area which she believed could be built for $3,000, friends and strangers began sending money for the project. Mrs. George Zabriskie Gray of New York sent $3,000 in memory of her daughter Grace then another $2,000 of which $1,000 was designated to build a ward for African-Americans. Hughson took charge of the project, and the first Grace Hospital was built on King Street in Morganton across from the Episcopal rectory. The hospital opened on Aug. 1, 1906, with two white wards, one male and one female, with four beds each and a crib and an annex for black patients with two wards of four beds each. The hospital had an operating room and a dispensary. Mrs. Hughson became the first superintendent of the hospital and devoted considerable time and energy to improving the institution's finances and facilities.

Kathy C. Bailey is the president and chief executive officer of UNC Health Blue Ridge.

In May 2025, the North Carolina Office of Emergency Medical Services verified the hospital as a Level III Trauma center.
