= Caldwell Memorial Hospital =

Coordinates: 35°54′37″N 81°32′06″W

Geography
- Location: Lenoir, North Carolina, United States

Services
- Beds: 72

History
- Opened: 1950

Links
- Website: www.caldwellmemorial.org
- Lists: Hospitals in North Carolina

Caldwell Memorial Hospital is a private, not-for-profit community hospital located in Lenoir, North Carolina, United States. Lenoir is the county seat of Caldwell County. The hospital's president and CEO is David Lowry.

== History ==
In December 1945, campaigns began to raise local money in order to receive state and federal funding to start building the hospital. Construction began in 1949 and on January 1, 1951 the hospital had its first patient. The hospital's medical staff started with 17 members.

In 2016, the hospital joined the UNC Health Care system.

== Divisions ==
- Anderson Medical Park
- The Ambulatory Infusion Center
- Caldwell Memorial Sleep Center
- Caldwell Rehabilitation Services
- The Center for Breast Health
- Center for Diabetes Health
- Center for Wound Treatment
- Community Pharmacy
- Digestive Health Center
- The Falls Medical Park
- The Falls Pediatrics
- The Family BirthPlace
- George M. Hancock Surgery Center
- Laurel Park Women's Health
- McBurney Primary Care
- McCreary Cancer Center
- Mulberry Pediatrics
- Pain Management Center
- Mulberry Pediatrics
- The Pain Management Center
- The Quest4Life Wellness Center
- Robbins Cardiology
- Robbins Ear, Nose, Throat & Allergy
- Robbins Medical Park
- Robbins Pulmonology
- Robbins Surgical
- Southfork Medical Park
- Westpointe Medical Practice

== Awards ==
- “Top Performer on Key Quality Measures®” Recognition from The Joint Commission
- Community Value FIVE-STAR® Hospital by Cleverley + Associates
- Second Hospital in NC to Earn Triple Gold Awards from Prevention Partners for worksite wellness: in the areas of physical activity, nutrition, and tobacco-free environments
- Silver Award from the North Carolina Department of Labor
- Caldwell County Economic Development Commission Industry of the Year for 2012
