= UNC Health Lenoir =

- UNC Health Care

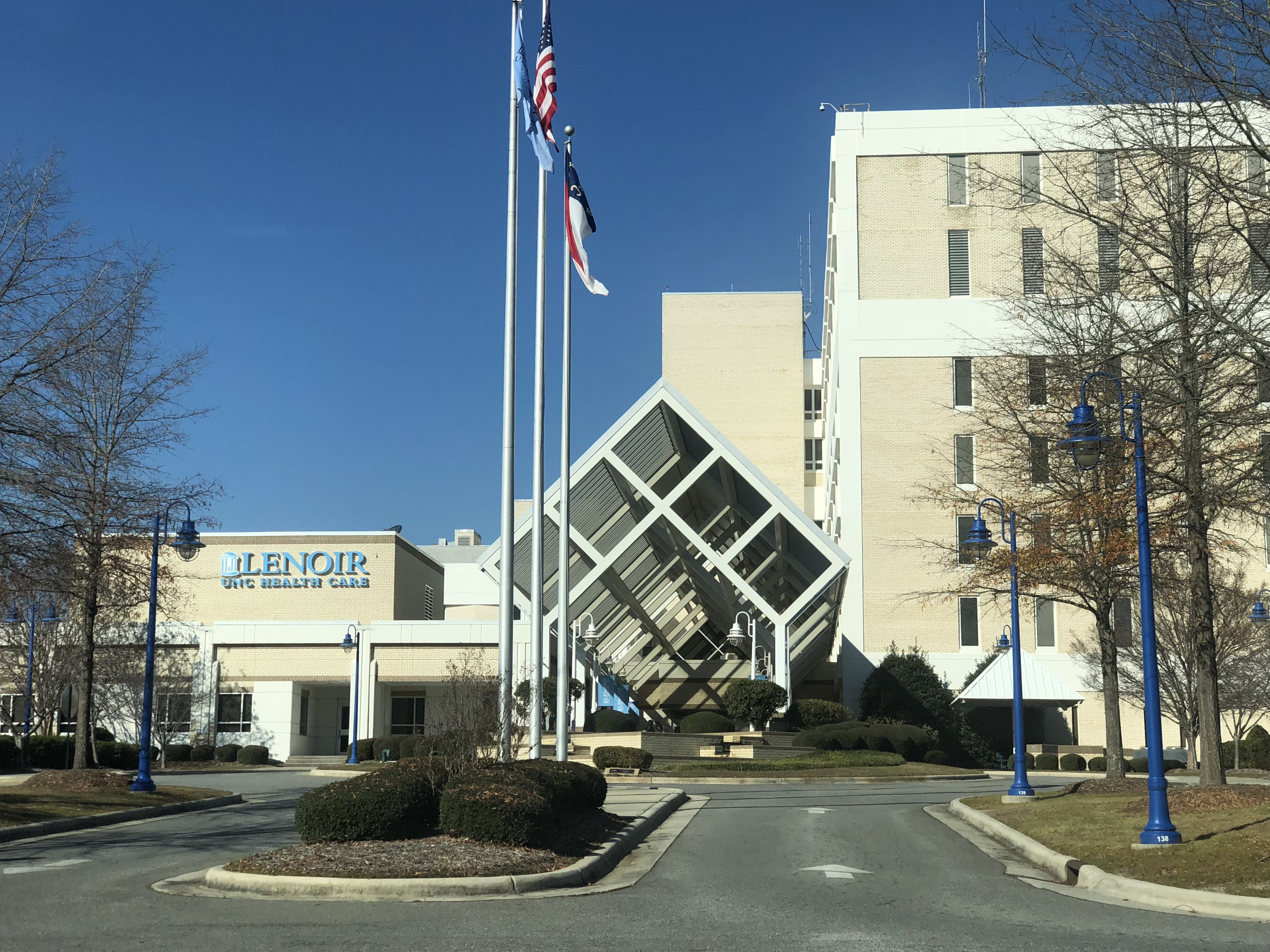

Geography
- Location: Kinston, North Carolina, United States
- Coordinates: 35.290°N 77.583°W

Organization
- Type: General, Specialist
- Network: UNC Health Care

Services
- Beds: 199

Helipads
- Helipad: FAA LID: 55NC

History
- Founded: 1973

Links
- Website: www.unclenoir.org
- Lists: Hospitals in North Carolina

UNC Health Lenoir is a not-for-profit hospital located in Kinston, North Carolina. The hospital is licensed for 199 beds and serves the residents of Lenoir, Greene and Jones and other surrounding counties. The hospital is staffed with over 100 physicians. The hospital offers inpatient, outpatient and preventive healthcare services. In addition, the hospital offers free educational health programs, seminars, and screenings. General services include general medical, surgical, obstetrical and gynecological care. Specialized services include cardiology, pulmonology, oncology, radiology, urology, orthopedics and orthopedic sports medicine, bariatric surgery and vascular surgery

In 1986, the Lenoir Memorial Foundation was established.

In 1965, the old Lenoir Memorial Hospital was outdated and too small to serve the growing community of Kinston and Lenoir County, and expansion or renovation was deemed unsatisfactory. In June 1973, a new $11 million, 435-bed facility opened.

== See also ==
- List of hospitals in North Carolina
