= List of hospitals in North Carolina =

North Carolina Trauma Hospitals.
Red dots represent Trauma Level I; Green dots represent Trauma Level II; Blue dots represent Trauma Level III.

This is a list of hospitals in North Carolina. Five hospitals serve as university-affiliated Level I trauma Academic medical centers: Duke University Hospital (Duke), ECU Health (ECU), UNC Health (UNC), and Atrium Health Wake Forest Baptist & Atrium Health's Carolinas Medical Center (Wake Forest), while Mission Hospital & WakeMed are unaffiliated Level I trauma centers. Twenty hospitals are certified as Critical access hospitals.

The first hospital in the state was a quarantine hospital, built in Wilmington, in 1835, called Mount Tirzah Hospital. The first psychiatric hospital was Dorothea Dix Hospital, built in Raleigh in 1848. The first general hospital established in 1875 was St. Peter's Hospital, located in Charlotte, which later merged into Carolinas Medical Center. Rex Hospital, in Raleigh, opened in 1894 is the oldest continuously operating hospital in the state.

There are 119 hospitals licensed by the State of North Carolina; includes one closed hospital (Martin General Hospital) & eight long-term care facilities. Mecklenburg County has the most hospitals in their county with ten. Twenty counties do not have a hospital. Duke University Hospital has the most general inpatient beds in the state, while Alleghany Health has the fewest.

== Hospital list ==
Name	City	County	Inpatient general beds (Note: General bed number from State of North Carolina Department of Health and Human Services - Division of Health Service Regulation.)	Trauma designation	Affiliation	Notes
AdventHealth Hendersonville	Hendersonville	Henderson	62	—	AdventHealth	Formerly Park Ridge Health
AdventHealth Polk	Columbus	Polk	25	—	AdventHealth	Formerly St. Luke's Hospital; Critical access hospital
Alleghany Health	Sparta	Alleghany	3	—	Atrium Health Wake Forest Baptist	Critical access hospital; formerly Alleghany Memorial Hospital
Angel Medical Center	Franklin	Macon	30	—	HCA/Mission	Critical access hospital
Ashe Memorial Hospital	Jefferson	Ashe	76	—	Novant Health (via Shared Services)	Critical access hospital
Atrium Health Anson	Wadesboro	Anson	15	—	Atrium Health	
Atrium Health Cabarrus	Concord	Cabarrus	447	Level III	Atrium Health	Teaching hospital.
Atrium Health Carolinas Medical Center/ Center for Mental Health	Charlotte	Mecklenburg	1064	Level I	Atrium Health	Teaching hospital.
Atrium Health Cleveland	Shelby	Cleveland	288	Level III	Atrium Health	
Atrium Health Lake Norman	Cornelius	Mecklenburg	36	—	Atrium Health	Satellite hospital campus of Atrium Health University City
Atrium Health Lincoln	Lincolnton	Lincoln	101	—	Atrium Health	
Atrium Health Mercy	Charlotte	Mecklenburg	185	—	Atrium Health	Satellite hospital campus of Carolinas Medical Center
Atrium Health Pineville	Charlotte	Mecklenburg	350	—	Atrium Health	Formerly Mercy Hospital South
Atrium Health Stanly	Albemarle	Stanly	97	—	Atrium Health	
Atrium Health Union	Monroe	Union	190	—	Atrium Health	Teaching hospital.
Atrium Health Union West	Matthews	Union	40	—	Atrium Health	
Atrium Health University City	Charlotte	Mecklenburg	150	—	Atrium Health	
Atrium Health Wake Forest Baptist Davie Medical Center	Bermuda Run	Davie	50	—	Atrium Health Wake Forest Baptist	Teaching hospital.
Atrium Health Wake Forest Baptist High Point Medical Center	High Point	Guilford	307	—	Atrium Health Wake Forest Baptist	
Atrium Health Wake Forest Baptist Lexington Medical Center	Lexington	Davidson	94	—	Atrium Health Wake Forest Baptist	
Atrium Health Wake Forest Baptist Medical Center	Winston-Salem	Forsyth	850	Level I	Atrium Health Wake Forest Baptist	Teaching hospital.
Atrium Health Wake Forest Baptist Wilkes Medical Center	North Wilkesboro	Wilkes	120	—	Atrium Health Wake Forest Baptist	
Blue Ridge Regional Hospital	Spruce Pine	Mitchell	46	—	HCA/Mission	Critical access hospital
Cannon Memorial Hospital	Linville	Avery	13	—	UNC Health Appalachian	Critical access hospital
Cape Fear Valley Betsy Johnson Hospital	Dunn	Harnett	131	—	Cape Fear	On license of Harnett Health System. Teaching hospital. Formerly Betsy Johnson Regional Hospital.
Cape Fear Valley-Bladen County Hospital	Elizabethtown	Bladen	48	—	Cape Fear	Critical access hospital
Cape Fear Valley Central Harnett Hospital	Lillington	Harnett	50	—	Cape Fear	On license of Harnett Health System. Teaching hospital. Formerly Central Harnett Hospital.
Cape Fear Valley Hoke Hospital	Raeford	Hoke	41	—	Cape Fear	—
Cape Fear Valley Medical Center	Fayetteville	Cumberland	636	Level III	Cape Fear	Teaching hospital.
CarolinaEast Medical Center	New Bern	Craven	307	—	—	—
CaroMont Regional Medical Center	Gastonia	Gaston	467	Level III	CaroMont Health	—
Carteret General Hospital	Morehead City	Carteret	135	—	—	—
Catawba Valley Medical Center	Hickory	Catawba	200	—	—	—
Central Carolina Hospital	Sanford	Lee	127	—	Duke LifePoint	
Columbus Regional Healthcare System	Whiteville	Columbus	154	—	Atrium Health	
Cone Health Alamance Regional	Burlington	Alamance	182	—	Cone Health	—
Cone Health Annie Penn Hospital	Reidsville	Rockingham	110	—	Cone Health	—
Cone Health Moses Cone Hospital	Greensboro	Guilford	754	Level II	Cone Health	Teaching hospital. Formerly The Moses H. Cone Memorial Hospital.
Cone Health Wesley Long Hospital	Greensboro	Guilford	175	—	Cone Health	—
Dosher Memorial Hospital	Southport	Brunswick	25	—	—	Critical access hospital
Duke Health Lake Norman Hospital	Mooresville	Iredell	123	—	Duke Health	Formerly Lake Norman Regional Medical Center
Duke Raleigh Hospital	Raleigh	Wake	204	—	Duke Health	Formerly Raleigh Community Hospital
Duke Regional Hospital	Durham	Durham	316	—	Duke Health	Teaching hospital.
Duke University Hospital	Durham	Durham	1106	Level I	Duke Health	Teaching hospital.
ECU Health Beaufort Hospital	Washington	Beaufort	120	—	ECU Health	Formerly Vidant Beaufort Hospital
ECU Health Bertie Hospital	Windsor	Bertie	6	—	ECU Health	Critical access hospital; formerly Vidant Bertie Hospital
ECU Health Chowan Hospital	Edenton	Chowan	49	—	ECU Health	Critical access hospital; formerly Vidant Chowan Hospital
ECU Health Duplin Hospital	Kenansville	Duplin	56	—	ECU Health	Formerly Vidant Duplin Hospital
ECU Health Edgecombe Hospital	Tarboro	Edgecombe	101	—	ECU Health	Formerly Heritage Hospital, Vidant Edgecombe Hospital
ECU Health Medical Center	Greenville	Pitt	847	Level I	ECU Health	Teaching hospital. Formerly Pitt County Memorial Hospital & Vidant Medical Center.
ECU Health North Hospital	Roanoke Rapids	Halifax	184	—	ECU Health	Formerly Halifax Regional Medical Center, Vidant North Hospital
ECU Health Roanoke-Chowan Hospital	Ahoskie	Hertford	86	—	ECU Health	Formerly Vidant Roanoke-Chowan Hospital
Erlanger Western Carolina Hospital	Murphy	Cherokee	57	—	Erlanger	Critical access hospital; formerly Murphy Medical Center
FirstHealth Montgomery Memorial Hospital	Troy	Montgomery	37	—	FirstHealth	Critical access hospital
FirstHealth Moore Regional Hospital	Pinehurst	Moore	337	—	FirstHealth	—
FirstHealth Moore Regional Hospital - Hoke	Raeford	Hoke	8	—	FirstHealth	—
FirstHealth Moore Regional Hospital - Richmond	Rockingham	Richmond	99	—	FirstHealth	—
Frye Regional Medical Center	Hickory	Catawba	209	—	Duke LifePoint	
Granville Medical Center	Oxford	Granville	62	—	—	—
Harris Regional Hospital	Sylva	Jackson	86	—	Duke LifePoint	Formerly MedWest-Harris
Haywood Regional Medical Center	Clyde	Haywood	120	—	Duke LifePoint	Formerly MedWest-Haywood
Highlands-Cashiers Hospital	Highlands	Macon	24	—	HCA/Mission	Critical access hospital
Hugh Chatham Memorial Hospital	Elkin	Surry	81	—	Atrium Health Wake Forest Baptist	
Iredell Davis Medical Center	Statesville	Iredell	102	—	Iredell	Also known as Iredell Davis Behavioral Health Hospital
Iredell Memorial Hospital	Statesville	Iredell	247	—	Iredell	—
LifeBrite Community Hospital of Stokes	Danbury	Stokes	53	—	LifeBrite	Critical access hospital; formerly Pioneer Community Hospital of Stokes
Maria Parham Health	Henderson	Vance	161	—	Duke LifePoint	Teaching hospital.
Mission Hospital	Asheville	Buncombe	733	Level I	HCA/Mission	Teaching hospital.
Mission Hospital McDowell	Marion	McDowell	65	—	HCA/Mission	Formerly McDowell Hospital
North Carolina Specialty Hospital	Durham	Durham	18	—	—	—
Northern Regional Hospital	Mount Airy	Surry	100	—	—	Formerly Northern Hospital of Surry County
Novant Health Ballantyne Medical Center	Charlotte	Mecklenburg	36	—	Novant Health	—
Novant Health Brunswick Medical Center	Supply	Brunswick	74	—	Novant Health	—
Novant Health Forsyth Medical Center	Winston-Salem	Forsyth	898	—	Novant Health	Teaching hospital.
Novant Health Huntersville Medical Center	Huntersville	Mecklenburg	151	—	Novant Health	Teaching hospital.
Novant Health Kernersville Medical Center	Kernersville	Forsyth	50	—	Novant Health	On license of Novant Health Forsyth Medical Center
Novant Health Matthews Medical Center	Matthews	Mecklenburg	154	—	Novant Health	—
Novant Health Medical Park Hospital	Winston-Salem	Forsyth	9	—	Novant Health	—
Novant Health Mint Hill Medical Center	Mint Hill	Mecklenburg	36	—	Novant Health	—
Novant Health New Hanover Regional Medical Center	Wilmington	New Hanover	701	Level II	Novant Health/NHRMC	Teaching hospital.
Novant Health Pender Medical Center	Burgaw	Pender	43	—	Novant Health / NHRMC	Critical access hospital; formerly Pender Memorial Hospital
Novant Health Presbyterian Medical Center	Charlotte	Mecklenburg	526	Level II	Novant Health	—
Novant Health Rowan Medical Center	Salisbury	Rowan	203	—	Novant Health	—
Novant Health Thomasville Medical Center	Thomasville	Davidson	101	—	Novant Health	—
Onslow Memorial Hospital	Jacksonville	Onslow	162	—	UNC Health	
The Outer Banks Hospital	Nags Head	Dare	21	—	ECU Health	Critical access hospital
Person Memorial Hospital	Roxboro	Person	38	—	Duke LifePoint	
Randolph Health	Asheboro	Randolph	145	—	American Healthcare Systems	—
Rutherford Regional Health System	Rutherfordton	Rutherford	129	—	Duke LifePoint	
Sampson Regional Medical Center	Clinton	Sampson	116	—	—	Teaching hospital.
Scotland Memorial Hospital	Laurinburg	Scotland	97	—	Atrium Health	Counts do not include 50 nursing home beds in the Edwin Morgan Center.
Scotts Hill Medical Center	Wilmington	New Hanover	66	—	Novant Health	Satellite hospital campus of Novant Health New Hanover Regional Medical Center
Sentara Albemarle Medical Center	Elizabeth City	Pasquotank	90	—	Sentara	Formerly Albemarle Hospital
Swain Community Hospital	Bryson City	Swain	48	—	Duke LifePoint	Critical access hospital; formerly MedWest-Swain
Transylvania Regional Hospital	Brevard	Transylvania	42	—	HCA/Mission	Critical access hospital
UNC Health Blue Ridge	Morganton	Burke	293	Level III	UNC Health	Teaching hospital. Formerly Grace Hospital, later Carolinas Healthcare System Morganton
Caldwell Memorial Hospital	Lenoir	Caldwell	110	—	UNC Health	—
UNC Health Chatham	Siler City	Chatham	25	—	UNC Health	Critical access hospital
UNC Health Johnston	Smithfield	Johnston	179	—	UNC Health	Formerly Johnston Memorial Hospital
UNC Health Johnston Clayton	Clayton	Johnston	50	—	UNC Health	On license of UNC Health Johnston
UNC Health Lenoir	Kinston	Lenoir	182	—	UNC Health	Formerly Lenoir Memorial Hospital
UNC Health Nash	Rocky Mount	Nash	262	—	UNC Health	Formerly Nash General Hospital, later Nash UNC Health Care
UNC Health Pardee	Hendersonville	Henderson	201	Level III	UNC Health	Teaching hospital. Formerly Pardee UNC Health Care & Margaret R. Pardee Memorial Hospital
UNC Health Rex	Raleigh	Wake	489	—	UNC Health	—
UNC Health Rex Holly Springs	Holly Springs	Wake	50	—	UNC Health	—
UNC Health Rockingham	Eden	Rockingham	108	—	UNC Health	Formerly Morehead Memorial Hospital
UNC Health Southeastern	Lumberton	Robeson	292	—	UNC Health	Teaching hospital. Formerly Southeastern Regional Medical Center
UNC Health Wayne	Goldsboro	Wayne	255	—	UNC Health	—
UNC Hospitals Hillsborough Campus	Hillsborough	Orange	83	—	UNC Health	On license of UNC Medical Center
UNC Medical Center	Chapel Hill	Orange	916	Level I	UNC Health	Teaching hospital.
WakeMed	Raleigh	Wake	664	Level I	WakeMed	Teaching hospital. Formerly Memorial Hospital of Wake County & Wake Medical Center
WakeMed Cary Hospital	Cary	Wake	208	Level III	WakeMed	Formerly Western Wake Medical Center
WakeMed North Hospital	Raleigh	Wake	61	—	WakeMed	On license of WakeMed Raleigh
Washington Regional Medical Center	Plymouth	Washington	25	—	Affinity Health Partners	Critical access hospital; formerly Washington County Hospital
Watauga Medical Center	Boone	Watauga	117	—	UNC Health Appalachian	Teaching hospital.
Wilson Medical Center	Wilson	Wilson	270	—	Duke LifePoint	

== Future hospital list ==
Name	City	County	Inpatient general beds	Affiliation	Notes
AdventHealth Weaverville	Weaverville	Buncombe	67	AdventHealth	Under construction
Atrium Health Harrisburg Hospital	Harrisburg	Cabarrus	109	Atrium Health	Plan opening in 2028
Cone Health Mebane Hospital	Mebane	Alamance	46	Cone Health	Plan opening in April 2029
Duke Health Cary	Cary	Wake	40	Duke Health	Plan opening in 2027
Greensboro Medical Center	Greensboro	Guilford	36	Atrium Health Wake Forest Baptist	Plan opening on January 1, 2029.
North Carolina Children's	Apex	Wake	500	Duke Health & UNC Health	Planned groundbreaking in 2027
Novant Health Asheville Medical Center	Asheville	Buncombe	34	Novant Health	Plan opening in 2030
Novant Health Leland Medical Center	Leland	Brunswick	20	Novant Health	
Novant Health Wesley Chapel Medical Center	Monroe	Union	32	Novant Health	Plan opening in 2030
UNC Hospitals West Cary Campus^{i}	Cary	Durham	152	UNC Health	Plan opening in January 2032
WakeMed Garner Hospital	Garner	Wake	45	WakeMed	Plan opening in summer 2028

== Notes ==
i. Unofficial name

== Closed hospitals ==
Name	City	County	Hospital beds	Year opened	Date closed	Affiliation	Notes
Martin General Hospital	Williamston	Martin	43	August 1950	August 3, 2023	Quorum Health	
Davis Regional Medical Center	Statesville	Iredell	130	1920	August 24, 2022	Community Health	Sold to Iredell Health and renamed Iredell Davis Behavioral Health
Carolinas ContinueCARE Hospital at University	Charlotte	Mecklenburg	35	2015	March 2022	–	
Cone Health Women's Hospital	Greensboro	Guilford	134	1977	February 23, 2020	Cone Health	Originally Greensboro Hospital. Reopened as Cone Health Green Valley Campus, a dedicated COVID hospital, April 2020-March 2021.
Carolinas ContinueCARE Hospital at Kings Mountain	Kings Mountain	Cleveland	28	March 2014	circa 2018	–	After Crawley Memorial closed, the LTAC was moved to campus of Atrium Health Kings Mountain.
Our Community Hospital	Scotland Neck	Halifax	20	1992	December 31, 2017	–	Now operating as a nursing home
Sandhills Regional Medical Center	Hamlet	Richmond	64	February 20, 2000	November 2017	FirstHealth	Leased by state for overflow during COVID-19 pandemic
Wake Forest Baptist Health Davie Hospital	Mocksville	Davie	10	1956	March 2017	Wake Forest Baptist Health	Formerly Davie County Hospital, later Davie Medical Center - Mocksville.
Novant Health Franklin Medical Center	Louisburg	Franklin	70	–	October 16, 2015	Novant Health	
Yadkin Valley Community Hospital	Yadkinville	Yadkin	15	–	May 22, 2015	HMC/CAH	Formerly Hoots Memorial Hospital
Anson Community Hospital	Wadesboro	Anson	52	1954	July 2014	Atrium Health	Replaced by Carolinas HealthCare System Anson
Vidant Pungo Hospital	Belhaven	Beaufort	25	1949	July 2014	Vidant	
Blowing Rock Hospital	Blowing Rock	Watauga	25	1952	October 2013	–	Building now a nursing home
Dorothea Dix Hospital	Raleigh	Wake	–	1848	2012	NCDHHS	Psychiatric hospital
Crawley Memorial Hospital	Boiling Springs	Cleveland	60	1974	December 2009	Atrium Health	Established in 1949 as Royster Memorial Hospital. In 1985 began converting acute care beds to skilled care beds.
Frye Regional Medical Center Alexander Campus	Taylorsville	Alexander	23	–	February 2007	–	Formerly Alexander Community Hospital
Mission Family Health Center	Burnsville	Yancey	6	–	September 2006	–	Formerly Yancey Community Medical Center
Good Hope Hospital	Erwin	Harnett	43	1913	April 2006	–	Now private mental health hospital.
District Memorial Hospital	Andrews	Cherokee	60	1956	June 2003	–	Acquired by Murphy Medical Center in 2001 (now Erlanger Western Carolina Hospital); Demolished in 2008
Sloop Memorial Hospital	Crossnore	Avery	38	1928	1999	–	Formerly Garrett Memorial Hospital, 1928–1983
Watts Hospital	Durham	Durham	–	1909	1976	–	Replaced by Durham County General Hospital; buildings are now part of North Carolina School of Science and Mathematics
Lincoln Hospital	Durham	Durham	123	1901	1976	–	Replaced by Durham County General Hospital.
St. Agnes Hospital	Raleigh	Wake	75	October 18, 1896	April 27, 1961	–	
Good Samaritan Hospital	Charlotte	Mecklenburg	100	1891	1982	–	First privately funded hospital in North Carolina built specifically to care for Black people. In 1961, sold to city and renamed Charlotte Community Hospital. Converted to Magnolia's Rest Home in 1982. Demolished 1996, to build Bank of America Stadium.
L. Richardson Memorial Hospital	Greensboro	Guilford	–	May 1927	April 1994	–	Originally named Greensboro Negro Hospital Association. Building now houses Kindred Hospital - Greensboro.
North Carolina Orthopedic Hospital	Gastonia	Gaston	–	1921	1978	NC DHR	
Central Carolina Convalescent Hospital	Greensboro	Guilford	134	October 11, 1948	1963	–	In 1958, the facility shifted its focus to general rehabilitation. Repurposed as a makeshift jail for civil rights protesters in 1963.
Babies Hospital	Wilmington	New Hanover	–	June 6, 1920	1978	–	

== Long term care hospitals ==
There are several Long term acute care hospitals and inpatient rehabilitation hospitals in the state of North Carolina.

Name	City	County	Hospital beds (Note: Includes both general and rehab beds.)	Affiliation	Notes
Asheville Specialty Hospital	Asheville	Buncombe	34	Mission	—
Atrium Health Carolinas Rehabilitation Charlotte	Charlotte	Mecklenburg	72	Atrium Health	On the campus of Carolinas Medical Center. New building opened January 2023.
Atrium Health Carolinas Rehabilitation Mount Holly	Belmont	Gaston	40	Atrium Health	—
Atrium Health Carolinas Rehabilitation NorthEast	Concord	Cabarrus	38	Atrium Health	—
Atrium Health Pineville Rehabilitation Hospital	Charlotte	Mecklenburg	29	Atrium Health	Formerly Carolinas Rehabilitation - Pineville
CarePartners Rehabilitation Hospital	Asheville	Buncombe	80	—	—
Carolinas ContinueCARE Hospital at Pineville	Charlotte	Mecklenburg	40	Atrium Health	—
Highsmith-Rainey Specialty Hospital	Fayetteville	Cumberland	66	Cape Fear	—
Kindred Hospital - Greensboro	Greensboro	Guilford	101	ScionHealth	—
LifeCare Hospitals of North Carolina	Rocky Mount	Nash	50	LifeCare	—
Novant Health Rehabilitation Hospital	Winston-Salem	Forsyth	68	Novant Health, Encompass Health	—
Peak Rehabilitation Hospital	Apex	Wake	52	Duke Health, Lifepoint Health, & WakeMed	—
Select Specialty Hospital - Durham	Durham	Durham	30	Select Specialty Hospital	—
Select Specialty Hospital - Greensboro	Greensboro	Guilford	30	Select Specialty Hospital	—
Select Specialty Hospital - Winston-Salem	Winston-Salem	Forsyth	42	Select Specialty Hospital	—

== Psychiatric hospitals ==
There are 15 private psychiatric hospitals in the state. The North Carolina Department of Health and Human Services operate three psychiatric hospitals and two Alcohol and Drug Abuse Treatment Centers.

Name	City	County	Year opened	Affiliation (Note: • Acadia: Acadia Healthcare • ADATC: North Carolina Department of Health and Human Services - Alcohol and Drug Abuse Treatment Centers • Daymark: Daymark Recovery Services • ECU Health • Emily: The Emily Program • Iredell: Iredell Health System • NCDHHS: North Carolina Department of Health and Human Services • Springstone: Springstone Behavioral Health Network • Summit: Summit Behavioral Healthcare • UHS: United Health Services • UNC Health)	Notes
Appalachian Regional Behavioral Healthcare	Linville	Avery	2021	UNC Health	
Broughton Hospital	Morganton	Burke	1883	NCDHHS	
Brynn Marr Hospital	Jacksonville	Onslow		UHS	
Carolina Dunes Behavioral Health	Leland	Brunswick		Summit	
Central Regional Hospital	Butner	Granville	2008	NCDHHS	
Cherry Hospital	Goldsboro	Wayne	1880	NCDHHS	
ECU Health Behavioral Health Hospital	Greenville	Pitt	2025	ECU Health & Acadia	
The Emily Program - Douglas	Durham	Durham		Emily	
The Emily Program - RTP	Durham	Durham	2026	Emily	
Fellowship Hall	Greensboro	Guilford	1971	–	
Good Hope Hospital	Erwin	Harnett		Daymark	
Holly Hill Mental Health Services	Raleigh	Wake		UHS	
Iredell Davis Behavioral Health Hospital	Statesville	Iredell		Iredell	Formery Davis Regional Medical Center
Julian F Keith Alcohol & Drug Abuse Treatment Center	Black Mountain	Buncombe		ADATC	
Old Vineyard Youth Services	Winston-Salem	Forsyth		UHS	
Raleigh Oaks Behavioral Health	Garner	Wake		Summit	
Triangle Springs	Raleigh	Wake	2018	Springstone	
UNC Hospitals Youth Behavioral Health	Butner	Granville	2023	UNC Health	Former R.J. Blackley ADATC
Walter B Jones Center Lakeside Psychiatric Hospital	Greenville	Pitt		ADATC	
Wilmington Treatment Center	Wilmington	New Hanover	2018	Acadia	

== Department of Defense hospitals ==
The United States Department of Defense armed forces operate three hospitals in North Carolina:

Military hospital	City	County	Inpatient beds	Trauma designation	Affiliation	Military base
Naval Medical Center Camp Lejeune	Jacksonville	Onslow		Level III	US Navy	Marine Corps Base Camp Lejeune
Womack Army Medical Center	Fayetteville	Cumberland	138	Level III	US Army	U.S. Army Fort Bragg

== Veterans Affairs hospitals ==
The United States Department of Veterans Affairs operates four Veterans Affairs hospitals in North Carolina.

Name	City	County	Inpatient beds	Trauma designation	Affiliation	Notes
Asheville VA Medical Center	Asheville	Buncombe	119	—	VHA	
Durham VA Medical Center	Durham	Durham	151	—	VHA	
Fayetteville VA Medical Center	Fayetteville	Cumberland	58	—	VHA	
W. G. (Bill) Hefner VA Medical Center Salisbury, NC	Salisbury	Rowan	260	—	VHA	
