= Cone Health Behavioral Health Hospital =

Hospital in North Carolina, United States

Coordinates: 36.0828°N 79.8225°W

Cone Health Behavioral Health Hospital (part of Cone Health), located at 700 Walter Reed Drive in Greensboro, North Carolina, is an 80-bed facility that specializes in helping children, adolescents and adults cope with mental health and/or addiction issues. Its comprehensive services focus on the total needs of the patient and their family.

In January 2013, Cone Health announced they would seek approval from the state of North Carolina to replace the existing facility with a new $38.5 million hospital. Five years later, Cone Health shifted the effort for a new hospital to a partnership with Guilford County to create a joint facility to address mental health needs in the Guilford County area.

In June 2021, the Guilford County Behavioral Health Center opened to provide behavioral health urgent care services 24 hours a day, 7 days a week to adults and adolescents in Guilford County. The Cone Health Behavioral Health Hospital is still open providing inpatient services for children and adults needing longer term mental health care.
