= HKS, Inc. =

American architectural firm

- Type: Private
- Industry: Architectural firm
- Founded: 1939; 87 years ago
- Founder: Harwood K. Smith
- Headquarters: Dallas, Texas, U.S.
- Key people: Heath May (CEO)
- Services: Architecture, sports venue designs
- Website: hksinc.com

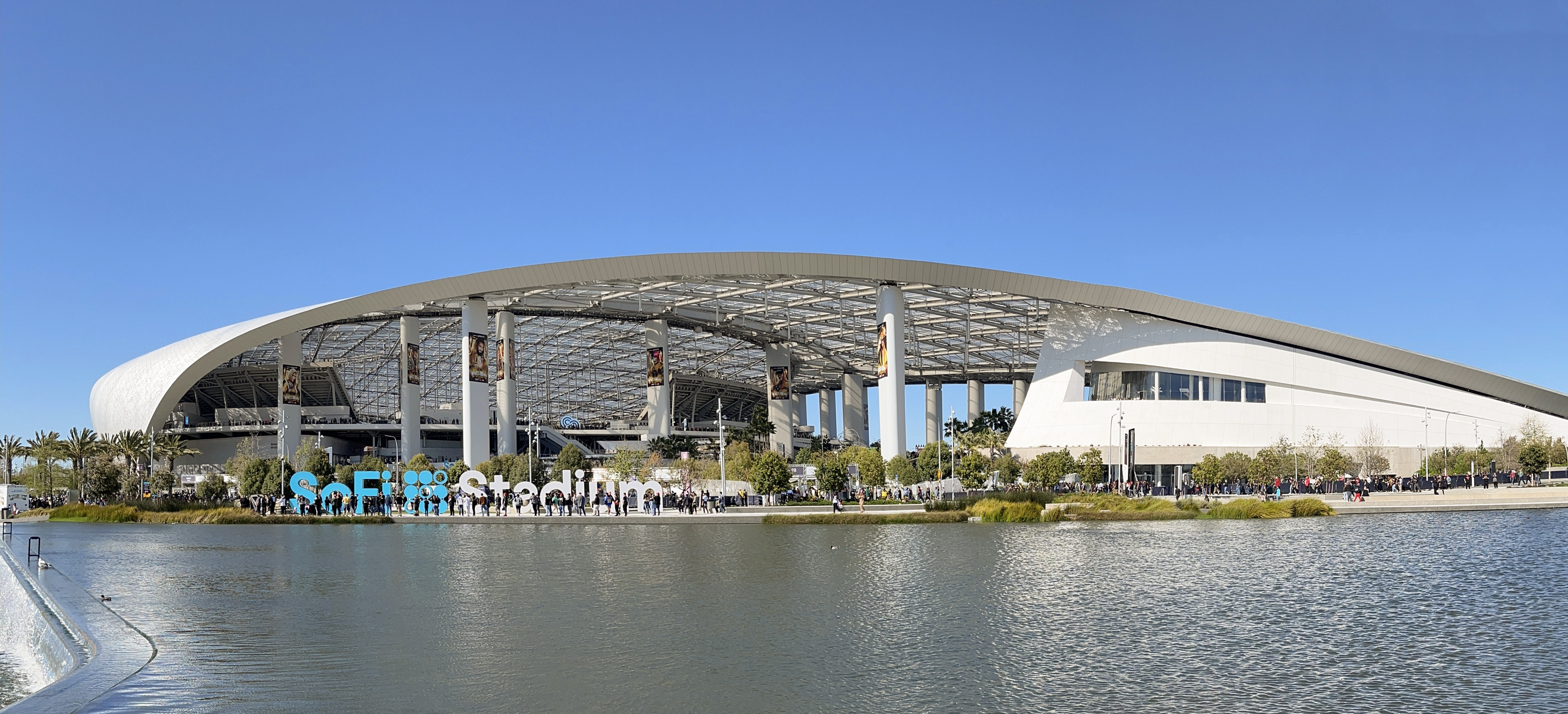
SoFi Stadium in Inglewood, California

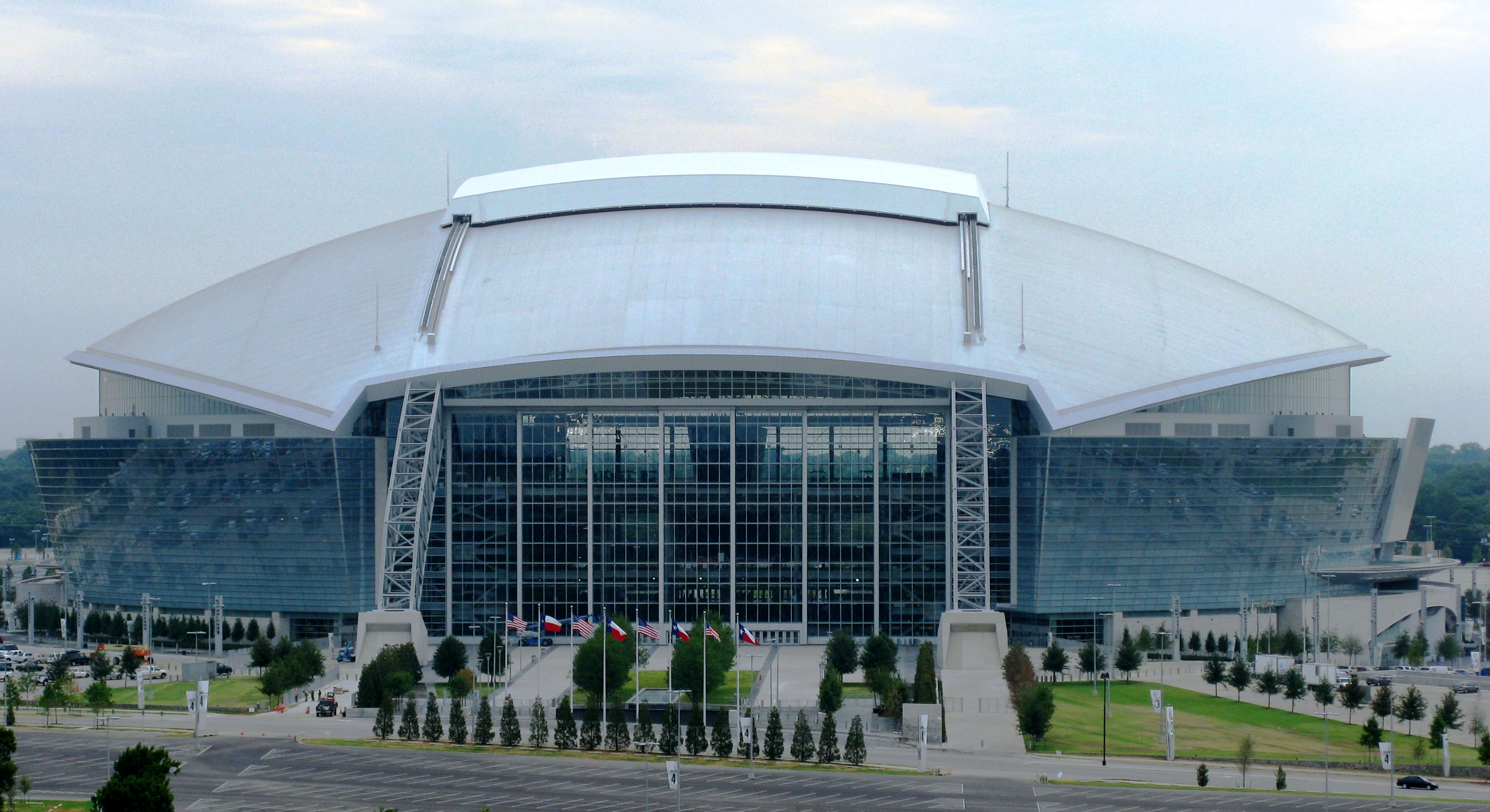
AT&T Stadium in Arlington, Texas

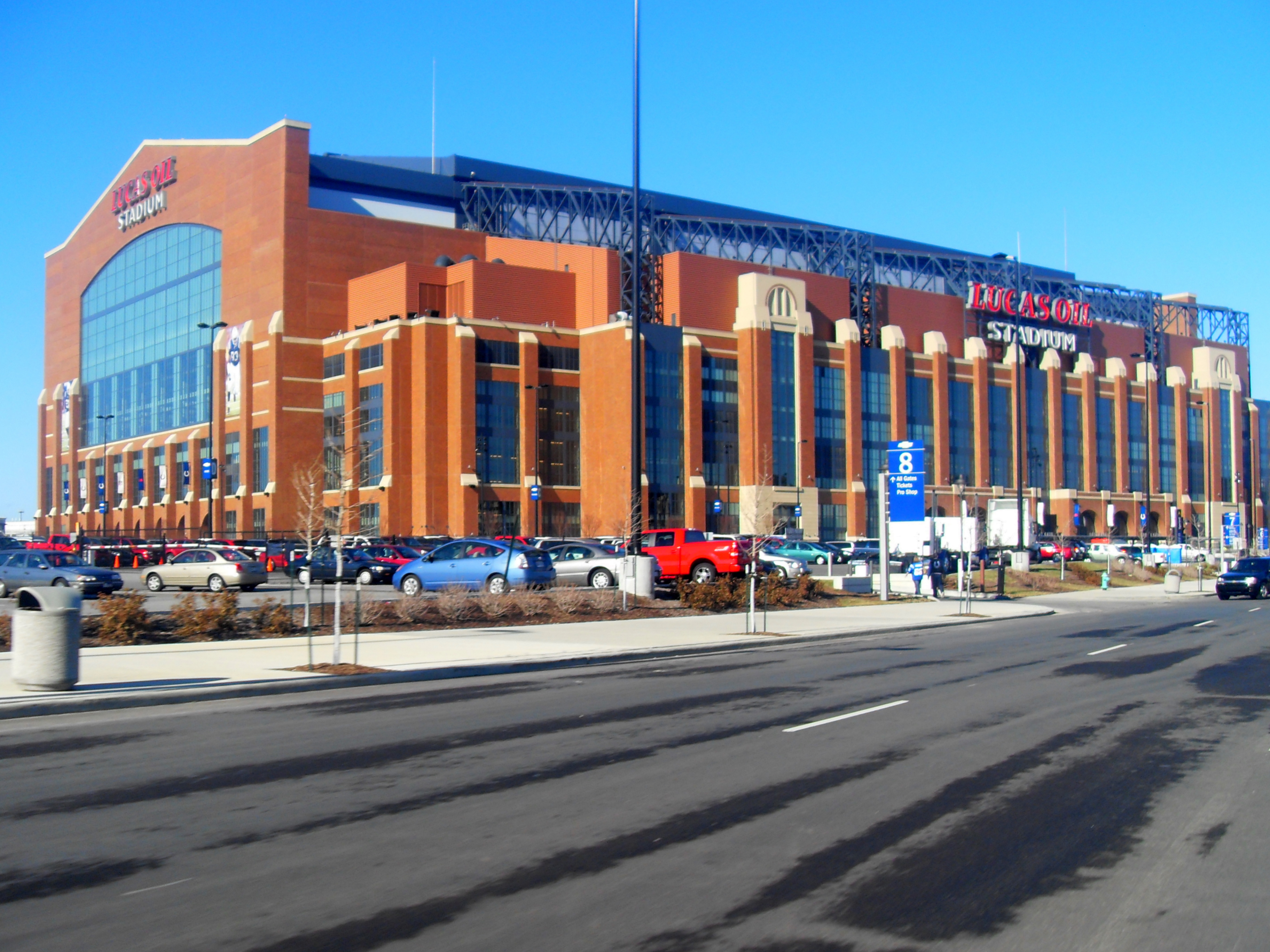
Lucas Oil Stadium in Indianapolis, Indiana

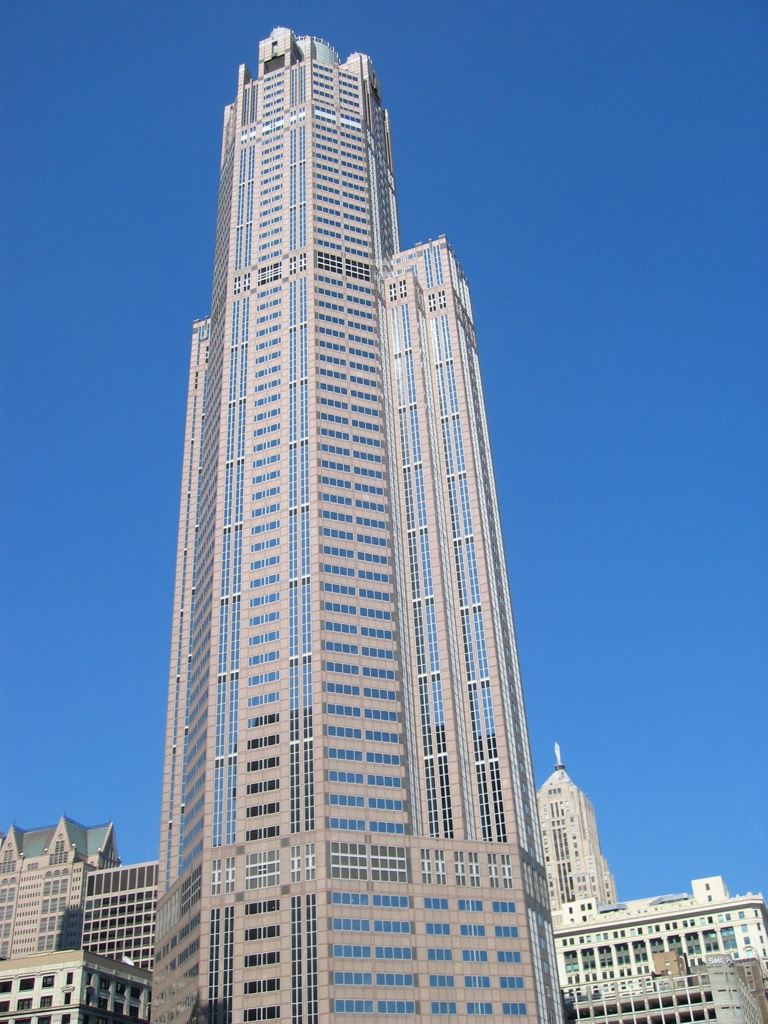
311 South Wacker Drive in Chicago, Illinois

HKS, Inc. is an American architectural firm founded in 1939. HKS has designed several multi-billion dollar sports venues and stadiums, such as the NFL's Lucas Oil Stadium, AT&T Stadium, SoFi Stadium, U.S. Bank Stadium, New Huntington Bank Field, and New Stadium at RFK Campus. The company is based in Dallas, Texas.

== History ==
HKS was founded in 1939 by Harwood K. Smith in Dallas, Texas. In 2002, HKS expanded its international presence by opening HKS Arquitectos in Mexico City to serve its Latin American clients. In 2006, HKS acquired the Stein-Cox Group and Trinity Design to have presences in Phoenix, Arizona, and Detroit, Michigan, respectively. In 2007, HKS expanded their hospitality architectural design services and also acquired the hospitality design firm Hill Glazier Architects, located in Palo Alto, California. The firm also opened offices in Miami, Nashville, Oklahoma City, and Chennai, India.HKS expanded its global presence in 2008 opening offices in Abu Dhabi and São Paulo, Brazil and again in 2010 with an office in Shanghai, China. In 2008 HKS acquired that part of the Ryder HKS joint venture it did not already own.

In 2011, HKS acquired the interior design firm Maregatti Interiors LLC in Indianapolis. The HKS Science & Technology Practice was formed after the firm acquired Earl Walls Studios in San Diego, California. HKS also opened new locations in Chicago, Denver, New York, and New Delhi, India. In 2012, HKS announced the acquisition of Miami-headquartered educational design firm HADP Architecture, Inc.

== Services ==
As of 2015, the firm employed more than 1000 people, making it one of the largest architectural firms in the United States and has completed services on structures valued in excess of $69 billion, with more than $12 billion of construction currently underway.

== Notable projects ==
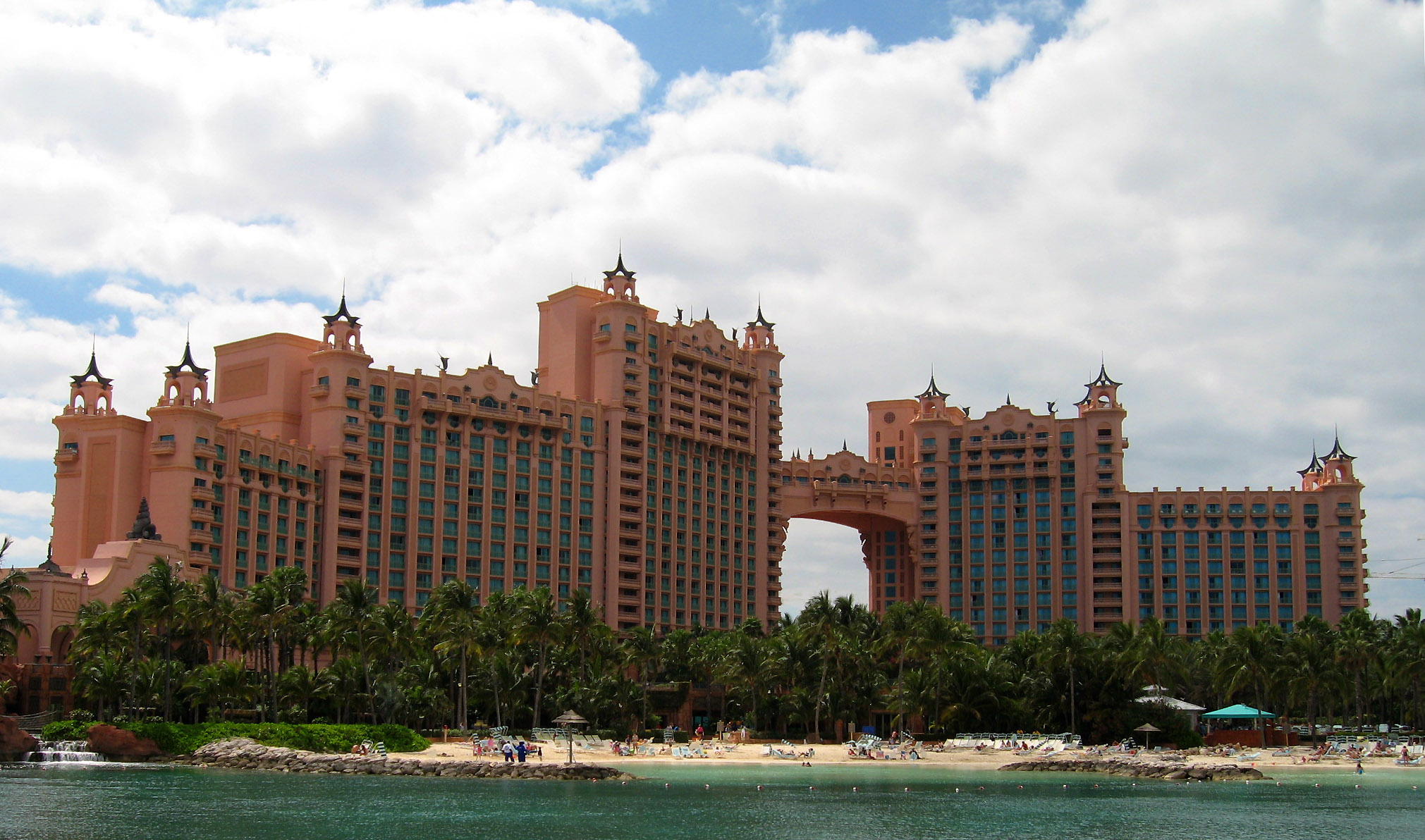
Atlantis Paradise Island Hotel

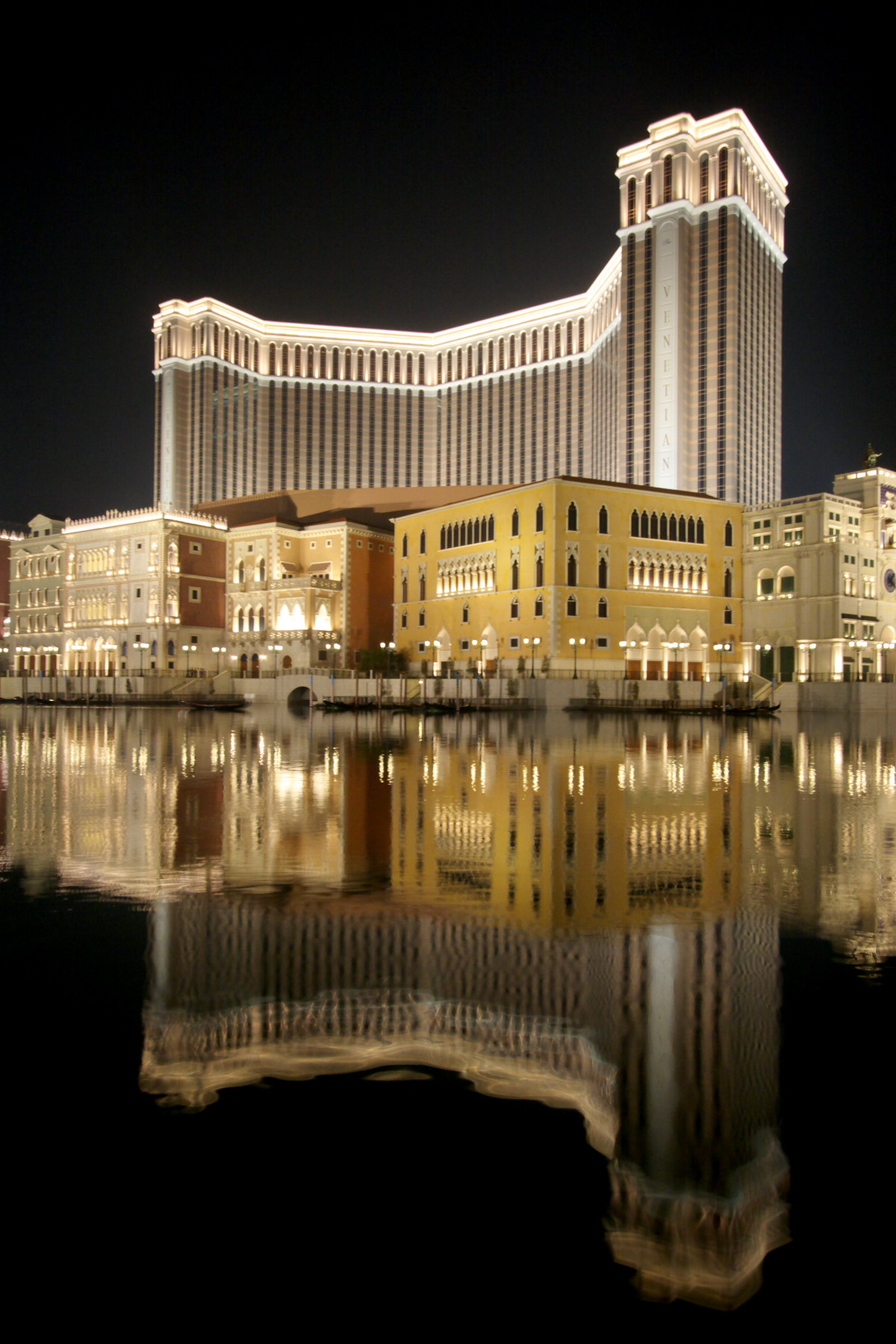
Venetian Macao-Resort-Hotel

This list includes projects in which HKS collaborated with other architecture firms.

- New Stadium at RFK Campus, Washington, D.C.
- New Huntington Bank Field, Brook Park, Ohio
- Orlando Regional Medical Center, Orlando, Florida
- SoFi Stadium, Inglewood, California
- AT&T Stadium, Arlington, Texas
- Bass Hall, Fort Worth, Texas
- U.S. Bank Stadium, Minneapolis, Minnesota
- FAU Stadium, Boca Raton, Florida
- Phoenix Children's Hospital, Phoenix, Arizona
- University of Texas MD Anderson Cancer Center, Houston, Texas
- Choctaw Stadium, Arlington, Texas
- Mosaic Stadium, Regina, Saskatchewan
- Bank of America Corporate Center, Charlotte, North Carolina
- DATCU Stadium, Denton, Texas
- College Park Center, Arlington, Texas
- American Airlines Center, Dallas, Texas
- Atlantis Paradise Island, The Bahamas
- Children's Medical Center, Dallas, Texas
- Dell Diamond, Round Rock, Texas
- Riders Field, Frisco, Texas
- Horner Ballpark, Dallas, Texas
- Toyota Stadium, Frisco, Texas
- Banner Island Ballpark, Stockton, California
- Lucas Oil Stadium, Indianapolis, Indiana
- Lone Star Park, Grand Prairie, Texas
- American Family Field, Milwaukee, Wisconsin
- The Palazzo, Las Vegas, Nevada
- Ritz-Carlton, Dallas, Texas
- Venetian Macao, Macau, China
- Stanley Park Stadium, Liverpool, England
- Club Santos Laguna, Torreón, Mexico
- Rate Field, Chicago, Illinois
- Uni-Trade Stadium, Laredo, Texas
- 311 South Wacker Drive, Chicago, Illinois
- Energy Center, New Orleans, Louisiana
- The Galleria, Metairie, Louisiana
- Es Con Field Hokkaido, Kitahiroshima, Japan
- Florida Hospital for Women, Orlando, Florida
- AdventHealth Parker, Parker, Colorado
- AdventHealth Weaverville, Weaverville, North Carolina
