= CaroMont Regional Medical Center =

Coordinates: 35.2716323°N 81.1396011°W

Caromont Regional Medical Center
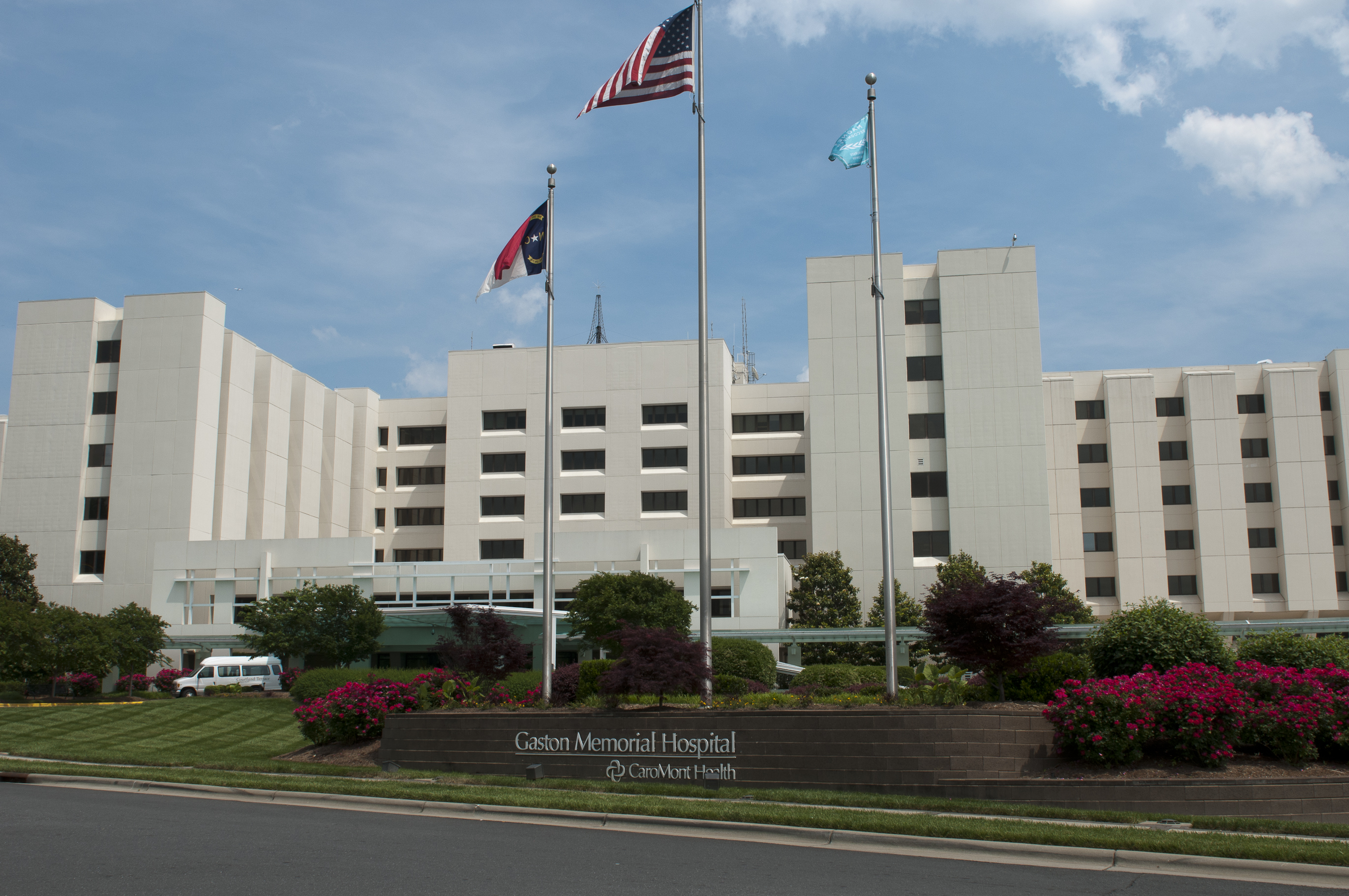
- CaroMont Regional Medical Center

Geography
- Location: Gastonia, North Carolina, United States

Organization
- Care system: Private, Medicaid, Medicare

Services
- Beds: 435

History
- Founded: 1946

Links
- Website: http://www.caromonthealth.org
- Lists: Hospitals in North Carolina

CaroMont Regional Medical Center is a not-for-profit hospital located in Gastonia, North Carolina, United States. The hospital was organized in 1946 as a memorial to soldiers who died in World War II, and the present Court Drive facility opened in 1973.

== History ==
Gaston Memorial Hospital was established in 1945 on North Highland Street, Gastonia. In the late 1960s, the hospital acquired 74 acres located between Cox Road and New Hope Road, which was adjacent to 112 acres owned by Gaston County. The hospital sold this land to Gaston County for $1, and the County built a new hospital facility. In 1970 Gaston Memorial Hospital also sold the county the original land and buildings located on North Highland, valued at $3 million, again for $1.

In 1973, Gaston Memorial Hospital began operating the hospital facility on Court Drive. Later that decade the hospital secured the funds for and built the Gaston Lincoln Mental Health Center, located adjacent to the hospital, and transferred the building to Gaston County.

In 1984, Gaston Health Care and Gaston County entered into the current lease arrangement; Gaston Health Care paid off the remaining 11 years of outstanding bonds which had been incurred to construct the facility. The next year the county conveyed all equipment, machinery and instruments owned by the county and located at the hospital to Gaston Health Care. In 1993 92.62 acres of property then being leased by the hospital were released from the lease and returned to the county for no consideration.

In 1997 Gaston Memorial Hospital completed construction on the Gaston Professional Center and Gaston Ambulatory Surgery at a cost of $20 million. The next year CaroMont Heart Center was formed to deliver Heart By-Pass Surgery in Gaston County. The New Birth Place opened in October 2004. CaroMont Regional Medical Centers currently has eleven limited service clinic locations throughout the region.

CaroMont Regional Medical Centers held a groundbreaking in June 2021 for the construction of a small full service hospital in Belmont. The facility is adjacent to the Belmont Abbey College and they plan to jointly offer some educational programs.
