= North Carolina Children's =

- Duke University Health System & UNC Health

Geography
- Location: Apex, Research Triangle, North Carolina, United States

Organization
- Affiliated university: Duke University School of Medicine & UNC School of Medicine

Services
- Emergency department: Yes
- Beds: 500

North Carolina Children's is a planned 500-bed pediatric hospital located in Apex, within the Research Triangle area of North Carolina. It will be jointly operated by both Duke University Health System & UNC Health Care. It will be North Carolina's first freestanding hospital dedicated to caring for kids. The planned cost is around $2 billion and the campus will be over 100 acres. Planned groundbreaking will be in 2027 with construction taking around six years.
