= Wesley Long Hospital =

Coordinates: 36.0832701°N 79.8258224°W

- Cone Health

Geography
- Location: Greensboro, North Carolina, United States

Organization
- Care system: Private
- Type: Community
- Network: Cone Health

Services
- Emergency department: Yes
- Beds: 175 Licensed beds

History
- Opened: 1917

Links
- Website: http://www.conehealth.com/wesley-long-hospital
- Lists: Hospitals in North Carolina
- Other links: List of hospitals in North Carolina

Wesley Long Hospital is a 175-bed acute-care facility located in Greensboro, North Carolina. The hospital was founded in 1917 by John Wesley Long, MD, a nationally known physician and surgeon, as a small 20-bed clinic. Today, Wesley Long is a 175-bed modern medical center and home to the Cone Health Cancer Center at Wesley Long. Wesley Long Hospital is a facility of Cone Health, a network of hospitals and physicians serving Guilford County, North Carolina and surrounding areas.

On February 24, 1972, Wesley Long's board of trustees approved a 120-bed addition and other improvements to what was then a 225-bed hospital.

On April 27, 1981, hospital administrator James Phelps was charged with accepting over half a million dollars in kickbacks during the late 1970s. Phelps, replaced by Ralph Holshouser Jr., pleaded guilty and served five years. The hospital did well for a while until changes in Medicare reimbursement. Wesley Long never recovered from the combination of the scandal and new Medicare rules, with a little over half its beds occupied by 1986. Moses Cone Memorial Hospital went through significant growth, while Wesley Long administrators avoided making many of the advances necessary to attract more patients. Dennis Barry led the hospital through changes that made it more competitive. But by 1996, with just over a third of its beds occupied, Wesley Long needed to either specialize or merge in order to continue doing well. The decision was made to merge with Cone.
