= Annie Penn Hospital =

Coordinates: 36.35348°N 79.6674706°W

Geography
- Location: Reidsville, North Carolina, United States

Organization
- Affiliated university: N/A

Services
- Emergency department: 24 Hours
- Beds: 110

Helipads
- Helipad: No

Links
- Lists: Hospitals in North Carolina

Annie Penn Hospital is located in Reidsville, North Carolina. Part of Cone Health, the hospital has 110 licensed acute-care beds and provides a number of specialities, including orthopaedic surgery, gastroenterology, gynaecology, urology, ophthalmology, general surgery, podiatry, nephrology, otolaryngology, and thoracic.

The building (the Penn House) is said to be "the largest and most elaborate Colonial Revival residence from the 1920-1940 period still standing in Reidsville". It is associated with the Penn family.
