= UNC Health Nash =

Coordinates: 35.9762°N 77.8552°W

Nash UNC Health Care
- UNC Health Care

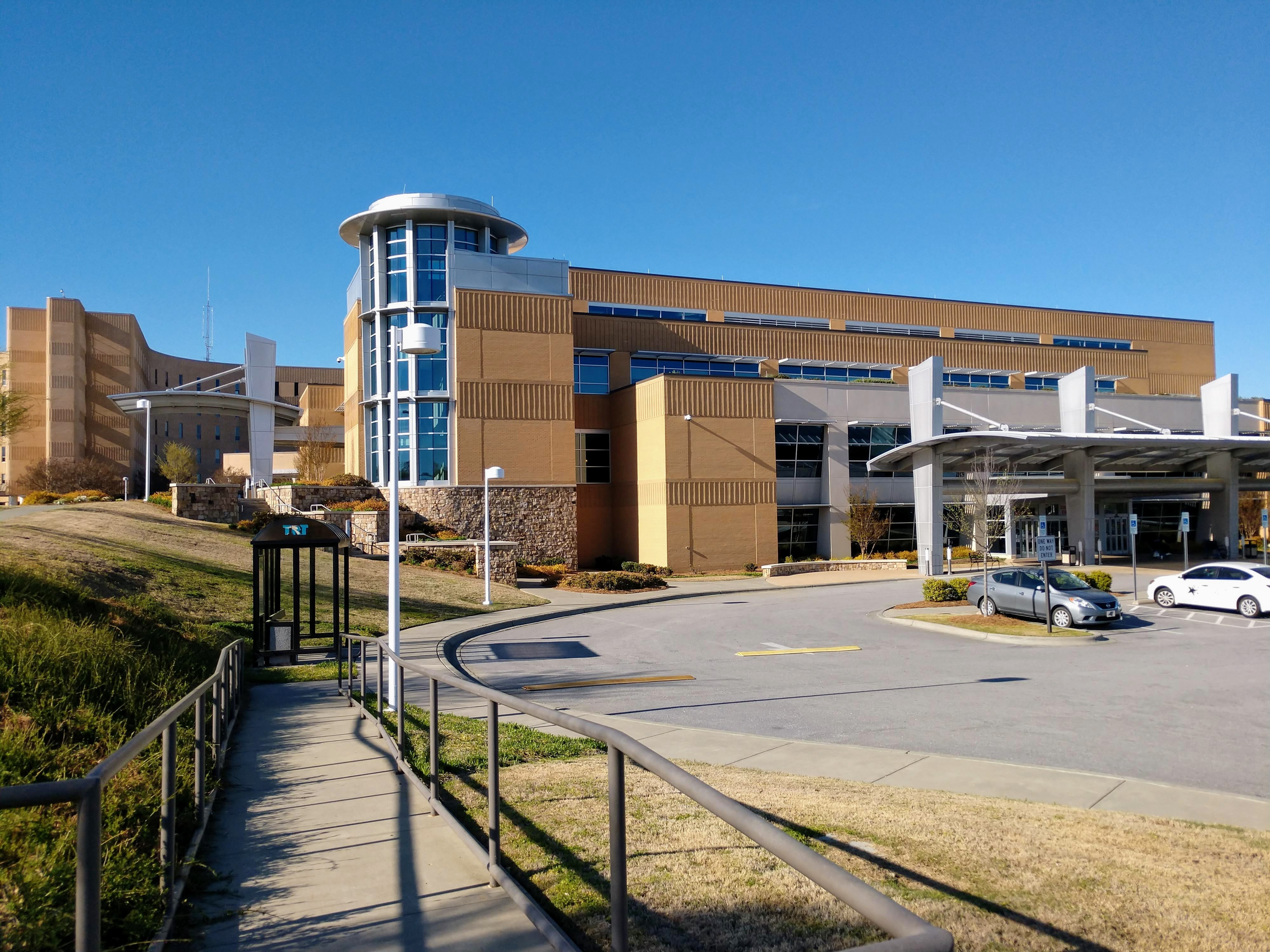
- Emergency entrance of hospital.

Geography
- Location: 2460 Curtis Ellis Drive, Rocky Mount, North Carolina, United States

Organization
- Type: General
- Affiliated university: None

Services
- Beds: 403

Helipads
- Helipad: Yes

History
- Founded: 1971

Links
- Website: nashunchealthcare.org
- Lists: Hospitals in North Carolina
- Other links: UNC Health Care

Nash UNC Health Care, opened in 1971 as Nash General Hospital, is a general hospital located in Rocky Mount, North Carolina. It was the first all-private-room hospital in North Carolina. It is home to a women's center, a cardiovascular services department, and a critical care unit. A subunit of the hospital, known as Nash Day Hospital, opened in 1984 as a free-standing outpatient surgery center. The hospital also operates the Bryant T. Aldridge Rehabilitation Center in honor of Kinston, North Carolina native Bryant T. Aldridge, the first manager of Nash General, which opened in 1999, and the Coastal Plain Hospital, a mental health facility. In 2004, the hospital opened a state-of-the-art Surgery Pavilion, followed in 2014 by the opening of a new Emergency Department and a new Nash Heart Center. In 2014, Nash Health Care became affiliates with UNC Health Care. In May 2016, the hospital opened the doors of its new $25 million Nash Women's Center.

Nash is a member of the UNC Health Care system, a non-profit integrated health care system, owned by the state of North Carolina and based in Chapel Hill, North Carolina.
