= UNC Health Wayne =

Coordinates: 35.398982°N 77.9524488°W

Geography
- Location: North Carolina, United States

Links
- Lists: Hospitals in North Carolina

UNC Health Wayne is a nonprofit hospital affiliate of UNC Health, a health care system in North Carolina and the largest private employer in Wayne County. Its name changed from Wayne Memorial Hospital when it entered into a management agreement with UNC Health in 2015 and in 2022, the hospital changed its name from Wayne UNC Health Care to UNC Health Wayne.

With the retirement of J. William "Bill" Paugh, FACHE, Robert A. “Bob” Enders Jr., FACHE, served as interim President & CEO in 2016, Janie Jaberg, RN, FACHE, served as President & CEO from 2016 to 2020, and Jessie L. Tucker III, Ph.D., FACHE, became the corporation and hospital President & CEO in 2020.

In September 2021, Moody's revised the hospital's outlook from negative to stable.

The hospital was recognized as a best maternity care hospital in 2022 and in 2023, UNC Health Wayne earned its highest patient safety and quality ratings in history with a Leapfrog Hospital Safety Grade of "A" and a CMS Star quality rating of 4 out of 5. The hospital also earned first ever certifications and accreditations in stroke, total hip and knee replacement, chest pain as well as platinum chest pain/MI care awards and high performance ratings for heart failure, kidney failure, stroke and COPD in 2022 and 2023.

UNC Health Wayne became a Vizient/AACN Nurse Residency Program site in 2023 and was recognized as a top 12% and largest hospital in Eastern North Carolina with the highest consistent quality and patient safety ratings (4-stars and 6 consecutive A grades).
