= Wake Forest Baptist Health Wilkes Medical Center =

Wilkes Medical Center
- Atrium Health Wake Forest Baptist Health
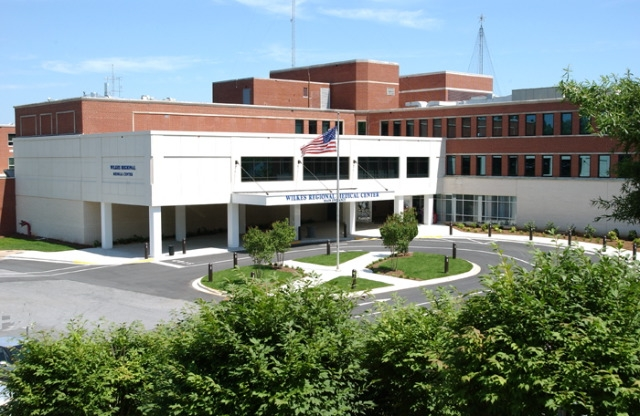

Geography
- Location: North Wilkesboro, Wilkes County, North Carolina, United States
- Coordinates: 36°09′33″N 81°09′29″W

Organization
- Care system: HMO, POS, PPO/EPO, Workers' Compensation, Medicaid, Medicare
- Type: Primary care, Secondary care

Services
- Beds: 130 Beds

History
- Opened: 1952 (as Wilkes General Hospital)

Links
- Website: www.wakehealth.edu/locations/hospitals/wilkes-medical-center
- Lists: Hospitals in North Carolina

Wilkes Medical Center is a 130-bed, medical center in North Wilkesboro, North Carolina, that offers a full range of medical, surgical, rehabilitative, pathology, ophthalmology and behavioral health services. WestPark Medical Park, which includes numerous offices for physicians, medical specialists, pharmacies, physical therapists, and other medical and health-related fields also serves the hospital. WMC is the largest hospital in northwestern North Carolina and is North Wilkesboro's largest employer. Originally, the hospital was opened on May 1, 1952, as Wilkes General Hospital.

== Expansion ==
Wilkes Medical Center, then Wilkes Regional Medical Center, expanded services in 2012 by establishing an Urgent Care Center in West Park Medical Plaza. The hospital also opened a Heart Center and a larger Emergency Department. The project cost a total of $15.5 million.

== Awards and honors ==
In 2013, Wilkes Medical Center was ranked as the top obstetrics center in the nation (among the 212 birthing centers rated), for "patient satisfaction" by Professional Research Consultants. Professional Research Consultants also gave Wilkes five stars for patient satisfaction for "outpatient quality of care, inpatient medical quality of care, and outpatient radiology quality of care.

== Affiliation ==
Wilkes Medical Center is affiliated with Wake Forest Baptist Medical Center. A 30-year lease agreement between the Board of Commissioners of the Town of North Wilkesboro and Wake Forest Baptist was completed early July 2017. Re-branding to Wake Forest Baptist Health – Wilkes Medical Center also began early July 2017.
