= CarolinaEast Health System =

Hospital in North Carolina, United States

Coordinates: 35.1141°N 77.0657°W

CarolinaEast Medical Center, the flagship hospital of CarolinaEast Health System, is a 350-bed acute care hospital located in New Bern, North Carolina. CarolinaEast Health System provides both inpatient and outpatient care to residents in Craven, Jones, Pamlico and surrounding counties in eastern and coastal North Carolina. The hospital has dedicated units for cardiac, neurological, intensive and intermediate care, pediatrics, women's care, adult psychiatry and cancer care, as well as general surgical and medical units.

The emergency department at CarolinaEast Medical Center provides care for over 75,000 people every year. CarolinaEast Emergency Medical Services maintains a staff of paramedics and EMTs that provide emergency medical care and transportation for New Bern and the surrounding areas.

Components of the Health System include CarolinaEast Medical Center, CarolinaEast Surgery Center, CarolinaEast Diagnostic Center, CarolinaEast Primary Care, CarolinaEast Heart Center, CarolinaEast Rehabilitation Hospital, CarolinaEast Home Care and Crossroads Adult Mental Health.

Founded in 1962 as Craven County Hospital, CarolinaEast has a history of bringing many firsts in healthcare to the coastal North Carolina community. CarolinaEast was the first to offer outpatient cardiac rehabilitation in eastern North Carolina. The first radiation therapy offered in the region was generated from the CarolinaEast campus. The first digital mammography and computed aided diagnosis was offered to the five counties by CarolinaEast Diagnostic Center. CarolinaEast was the first non-academic health care facility to offer lifesaving, cancer detecting PET-CT scanning. The adult psychiatry inpatient unit at CarolinaEast Medical Center, known as Crossroads Mental Health, was awarded the 2013 Clinical Program of the Year award by Horizon Health.

The 230+ member medical staff represents nearly all medical specialties. The physicians are supported by over 1800 professional and ancillary staff and 430 volunteers. Centers of excellence for CarolinaEast include comprehensive cardiac care, cardio thoracic surgery, leading edge cancer care, rehabilitation, and diagnostic imaging.

In 2023, the Carolina East Medical Center was given an ‘A’ Rating for the Hospital Safety Grade from Leapfrog Group’s Fall 2023 Hospital Safety Guide. In 2023, Carolina East Health also ended its affiliation with UNC Health.
