= ARMC6 =

Protein-coding gene in the species Homo sapiens

Identifiers
- Aliases: ARMC6, R30923_1, armadillo repeat containing 6
- External IDs: MGI: 1924063; HomoloGene: 14121; GeneCards: ARMC6; OMA:ARMC6 - orthologs

Gene location (Human)
Chr.	Chromosome 19 (human)
Band	19p13.11	Start	19,033,575 bp
Band	19p13.11	End	19,060,311 bp

Gene location (Mouse)
Chr.	Chromosome 8 (mouse)
Band	8|8 B3.3	Start	70,672,822 bp
Band	8|8 B3.3	End	70,687,116 bp
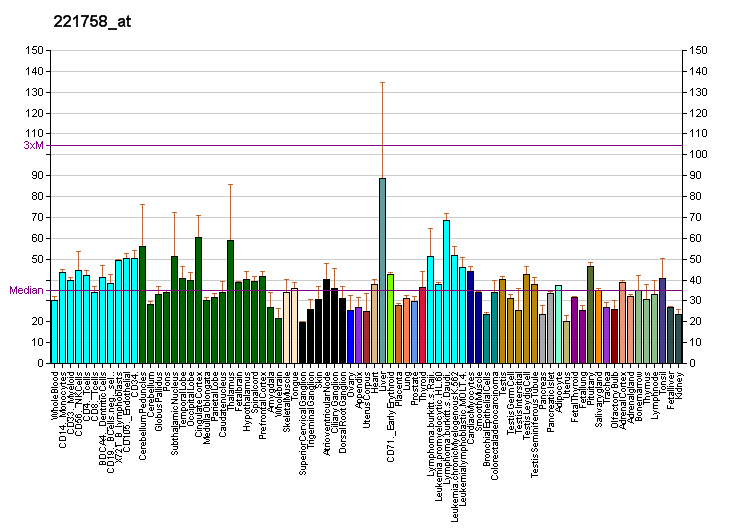
RNA expression pattern
Bgee	Human / Mouse (ortholog); Top expressed in: right lobe of liver; gonad; apex of heart; ganglionic eminence; granulocyte; mucosa of transverse colon; right lobe of thyroid gland; prefrontal cortex; left testis; right testis / Top expressed in: barrel cortex; dentate gyrus of hippocampal formation granule cell; superior cervical ganglion; visual cortex; otic vesicle; neural tube; superior frontal gyrus; primary visual cortex; spinal ganglia; lumbar spinal ganglion; More reference expression data
BioGPS	More reference expression data
Orthologs
Species	Human	Mouse
Entrez	93436	76813
Ensembl	ENSG00000105676	ENSMUSG00000002343
UniProt	Q6NXE6	Q8BNU0
RefSeq (mRNA)	NM_001199196; NM_033415	NM_133972
RefSeq (protein)	NP_001186125; NP_219483	NP_598733
Location (UCSC)	Chr 19: 19.03 – 19.06 Mb	Chr 8: 70.67 – 70.69 Mb
PubMed search
- Wikidata
View/Edit Human	View/Edit Mouse

The human gene ARMC6 encodes a protein called Armadillo repeat-containing protein 6.

The function of this gene's protein product has not been determined. A related protein in mouse suggests that this protein has a conserved function.

The protein is characterized by the presence of armadillo repeats in its amino acid sequence. Diseases associated with ARMC6 include pancreatic cancer, and pancreatitis.
