= North Carolina Specialty Hospital =

Hospital in North Carolina, United States

Coordinates: 36.0431°N 78.8969°W

North Carolina Specialty Hospital (NCSH) is a specialty hospital located in northern Durham, North Carolina. The hospital provides orthopaedic, ophthalmogic, otolaryngology (ENT), plastic, and general surgery care, as well as pain management techniques and podiatric care. NCSH is the oldest hospital in Durham, dating back to 1926, when it was formed as an eye, ear, nose, and throat hospital originally known as McPherson Hospital, named after Dr. Samuel McPherson, an EENT specialist. In the early-1990s, the hospital was renamed as the North Carolina Eye and Ear Hospital. It was located at the time in its original building in downtown Durham, near the East Campus of Duke University. In May 2005, NCSH moved to its current location in northern Durham, and was renamed as North Carolina Specialty Hospital in 2000.

In 2009, North Carolina Specialty Hospital was named the top hospital in North Carolina, and among the top 10 in the United States, for its patient care ratings, per the Hospital Consumer Assessment of Healthcare Providers and Systems (HCAHPS), a division of the Centers for Medicare & Medicaid Services (CMS).

NCSH is jointly owned by Surgery Partners (49%), and physicians from North Carolina Eye and Ear Associates and Triangle Orthopaedic Associates (51%).
