= Cone Health =

US not-for-profit healthcare delivery system

- Company type: Non-profit
- Industry: Healthcare
- Founded: 1953; 73 years ago
- Headquarters: Greensboro, North Carolina, United States
- Area served: Guilford County, North Carolina, Rockingham County, North Carolina, Forsyth County, North Carolina, Alamance County, North Carolina Piedmont Triad
- Owner: Risant Health; (2024–present)
- Number of employees: 13,000
- Website: conehealth.com

Cone Health is a private, not-for-profit healthcare delivery system based in Greensboro, North Carolina. The health network serves people in Alamance, Forsyth, Guilford, Randolph, Rockingham and surrounding counties in central North Carolina. Hospitals in the Cone Health network include Moses H. Cone Memorial Hospital, Wesley Long Hospital, and Cone Health Behavioral Health Hospital in Greensboro as well as Alamance Regional Medical Center (Burlington, North Carolina) and Annie Penn Hospital (Reidsville, North Carolina). Beyond the hospitals, health care services are offered at MedCenter High Point, MedCenter Kernersville, MedCenter Mebane, MedCenter Greensboro and a wide range of primary care and specialty practices staffed by Cone Health Medical Group physicians.

The Moses H. Cone Memorial Hospital, the flagship of the system, opened in 1953 on 63 acres (250,000 m^{2}) near downtown Greensboro. Bertha Cone established it in honor of her husband, Moses H. Cone. Moses Cone was a textile magnate and founder of Cone Mills.

Cone Health is active in primary care, cardiology, neuroscience, oncology, orthopedics, rehabilitation, obstetrics and many other specialties.

U.S. News & World Report. listed Cone Health hospitals as a 2022-2023 High Performing Hospital in 17 of 20 common adult procedures and conditions.

In August 2020, Cone Health announced its intent to merge with Sentara Healthcare, though the planned consolidation was later canceled in 2021.

On June 21, 2024, Cone Health announced it had agreed to be acquired by Risant Health, a nonprofit, charitable organization created in 2023 by California-based Kaiser Permanente. In December, it was announced that the purchase had been completed.
