= ARMC5 =

Protein-coding gene in the species Homo sapiens

Identifiers
- Aliases: ARMC5, AIMAH2, armadillo repeat containing 5
- External IDs: OMIM: 615549; MGI: 2384586; GeneCards: ARMC5

Gene location (Human)
Chr.	Chromosome 16 (human)
Band	16p11.2	Start	31,458,080 bp
Band	16p11.2	End	31,467,166 bp

Gene location (Mouse)
Chr.	Chromosome 7 (mouse)
Band	7|7 F3	Start	127,836,514 bp
Band	7|7 F3	End	127,844,272 bp
RNA expression pattern
Bgee	Human / Mouse (ortholog); Top expressed in: tendon of biceps brachii; vena cava; nasal epithelium; cerebellar vermis; parotid gland; right lobe of liver; skin of arm; Skeletal muscle tissue of rectus abdominis; Skeletal muscle tissue of biceps brachii; gastrocnemius muscle / Top expressed in: Paneth cell; Rostral migratory stream; hair follicle; conjunctival fornix; islet of Langerhans; lumbar spinal ganglion; external carotid artery; internal carotid artery; retinal pigment epithelium; endothelial cell of lymphatic vessel; More reference expression data
BioGPS	n/a
Orthologs
Databases	NCBI: entry; OMA: entry
Species	Human	Mouse
Entrez	79798	233912
Ensembl	ENSG00000140691	ENSMUSG00000042178
UniProt	Q96C12	Q5EBP3
RefSeq (mRNA)	NM_001105247; NM_001288767; NM_001301820; NM_024742	NM_146205
RefSeq (protein)	NP_001098717; NP_001275696; NP_001288749; NP_079018	NP_666317
Location (UCSC)	Chr 16: 31.46 – 31.47 Mb	Chr 7: 127.84 – 127.84 Mb
PubMed search
- Wikidata
View/Edit Human	View/Edit Mouse

Armadillo repeat containing 5 is a protein-coding gene in humans that is located on Chromosome 16.
