= Cone Health Alamance Regional =

Alamance Regional Medical Center
- Cone Health

Geography
- Location: Burlington, North Carolina, United States
- Coordinates: 36.063466°N 79.502078°W

Organization
- Care system: Public
- Type: General

Services
- Beds: 238 Licensed Beds

History
- Founded: 1995

Links
- Website: http://www.armc.com/
- Lists: Hospitals in North Carolina
- Other links: List of hospitals in North Carolina

Cone Health Alamance Regional, formerly Alamance Regional Medical Center, is a private, not-for-profit 238 bed hospital located in Burlington, North Carolina. The hospital opened in 1995 on Huffman Mill Road. Alamance Regional provides healthcare to residents of Alamance County, North Carolina and surrounding areas. Alamance Regional joined the Cone Health network in May 2013.

== History ==
Alamance Regional Medical Center's roots began in 1916 with the opening of Rainey Hospital at 1308 Rainey Street in East Burlington. This hospital was renamed Alamance General Hospital, Inc., in 1937. Rainey Hospital was the primary hospital in the area until Alamance County Hospital opened at 319 North Graham-Hopedale Road. Rainey Hospital closed in 1961 when a replacement facility was built Alamance Memorial Hospital. The former hospital building is still used by private businesses.

Alamance County hospital opened in 1951. This hospital was operated by Alamance County until turning private in the 1980s. The former hospital building is currently owned and operated by the Alamance County government as the Human Services Center.

Alamance Memorial Hospital opened as a 100-bed facility off Edgewood Avenue in Burlington as a replacement for Rainey Hospital. This facility was demolished and replaced with a retirement facility after the merger of the two county hospitals into Alamance Regional Medical Center.

In 1986, the two hospital boards merged the hospitals by resolution, making them subsidiaries of Alamance Health Services. Alamance Regional Medical Center was constructed as a replacement for the two older hospitals and opened in 1995. In 2013, Alamance Regional Medical Center merged with Cone Health and became Cone Health Alamance Regional Medical Center.

== Awards ==
In 2012 and 2013, Alamance Regional Medical Center received the Most Wired Award from the American Hospital Association for its use of information technology in patient care.
