= UNC Medical Center =

- UNC Health Care

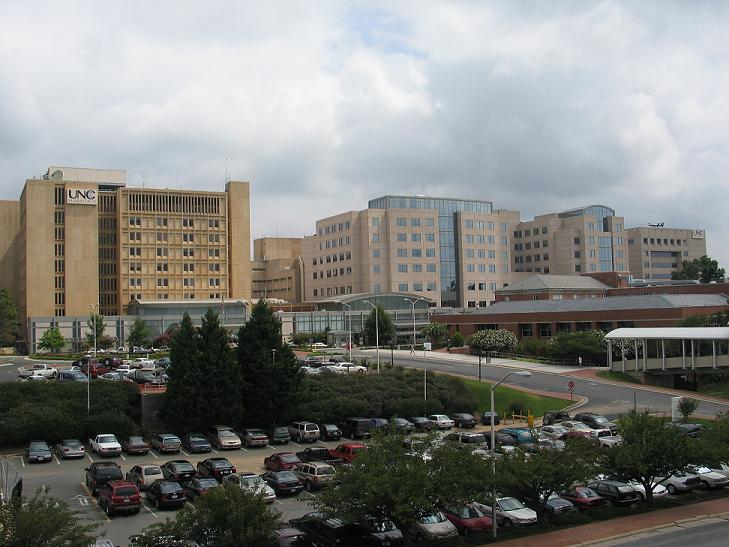
- North Carolina Memorial Hospital (left) and North Carolina Children's Hospital (right), Chapel Hill, North Carolina

Geography
- Location: 101 Manning Dr, Chapel Hill, NC
- Coordinates: 35.904744°N 79.050458°W

Organisation
- Care system: Public
- Type: Teaching
- Affiliated university: UNC School of Medicine
- Network: UNC Health Care

Services
- Emergency department: Level I Adult Trauma Center / Level I Pediatric Trauma Center
- Beds: 932

Helipads
- Helipad: FAA LID: 14NR
Number	Length		Surface
Number	ft	m	Surface
H1	57x51	17x16

History
- Founded: 1952

Links
- Website: uncmedicalcenter.org

UNC Medical Center (UNCMC) is a 932-bed non-profit, nationally ranked, public, research and academic medical center located in Chapel Hill, North Carolina, providing tertiary care for the Research Triangle, surrounding areas and North Carolina. The medical center is the flagship campus of the UNC Health Care Health System and is made up of four hospitals that include the North Carolina Memorial Hospital, North Carolina Children's Hospital, North Carolina Neurosciences Hospital, North Carolina Women's Hospital, and the North Carolina Cancer Hospital. UNCMC is affiliated with the University of North Carolina School of Medicine. UNCMC features an ACS designated adult and pediatric Level 1 Trauma Center and has a helipad to handle medevac patients.

== History ==
UNC Medical Center was first proposed in 1948 by Governor Robert Gregg Cherry when picking a location for the UNC School of Medicine. A 400-bed hospital was proposed to be built next to the medical school, and ultimately completed in 1952. The hospital only consisted of North Carolina Memorial Hospital until the new additions of the medical center.

== North Carolina Memorial Hospital ==
The first hospital in what later became known as UNC Hospitals and the UNC Health Care System was North Carolina Memorial Hospital, which opened on Sept. 2, 1952. North Carolina Memorial Hospital is the largest hospital in the medical center featuring 503 beds. The hospital also includes an adult Level 1 Trauma Center, Burn Center, and Stroke Center that treat over 70,000 patients annually.

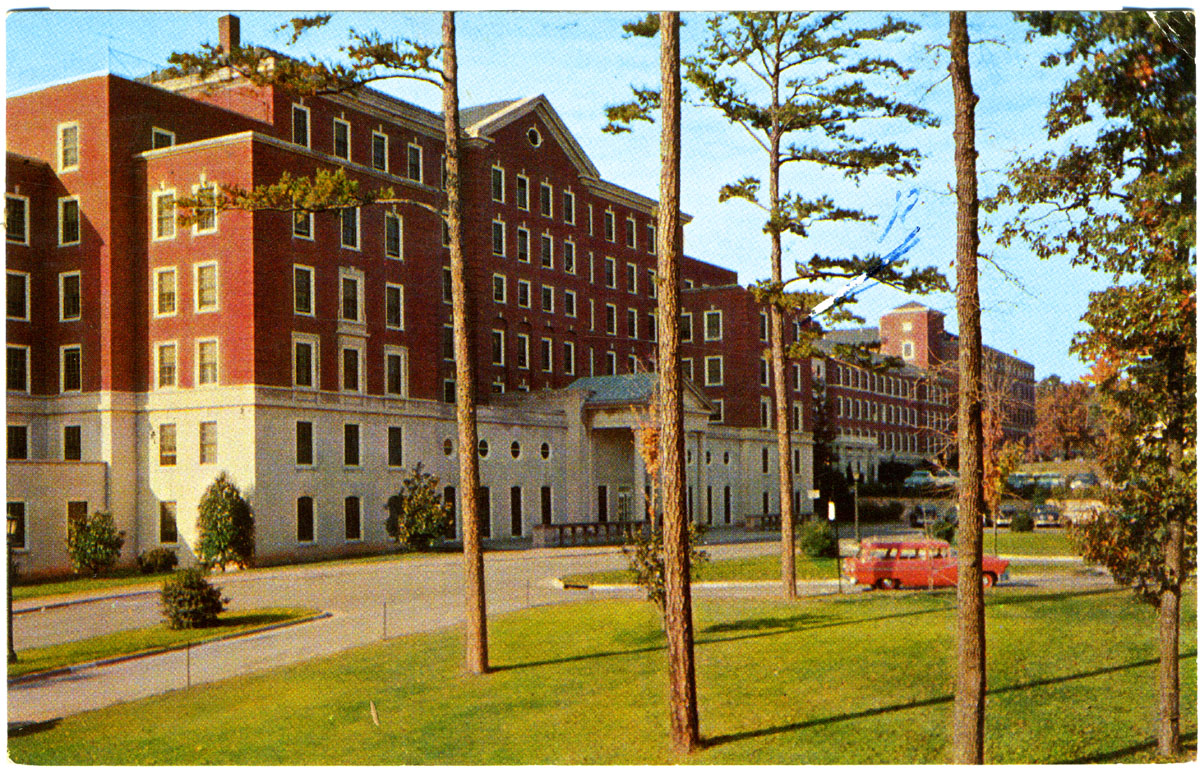
A 1957 photo of the exterior of North Carolina Memorial Hospital.

In 2019 it was announced that a new 7 story, 335,000 ft^{2} tower would be built on the UNC medical center campus at a cost of $257 million. The new addition is set to house 24 operating rooms and dedicates 2 floors to 56 new ICU beds. The addition will also include reception areas on each floor and offices for staff.

=== Controversy ===
In August 2019, the Joint Commission has put UNC Medical Center's accreditation status on probation after finding several problems with the medical center. The Joint Commission has said that problems include insufficient suicide screening assessments and lack of suicide resistant furniture in psychiatric health areas. The hospital has responded by issuing a statement that there was "no finding of any immediate threats to public health and safety."

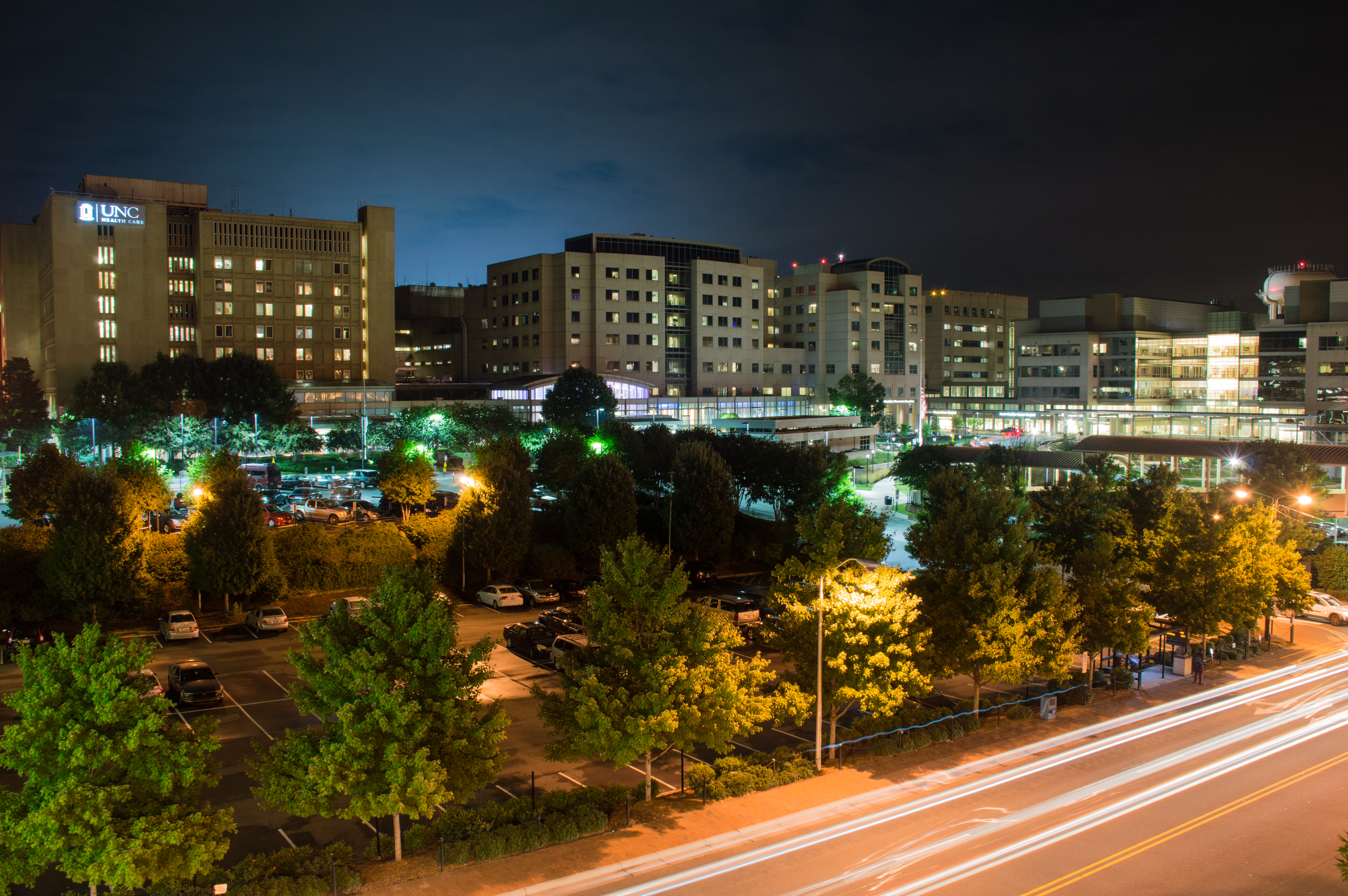
UNC Medical Center at night

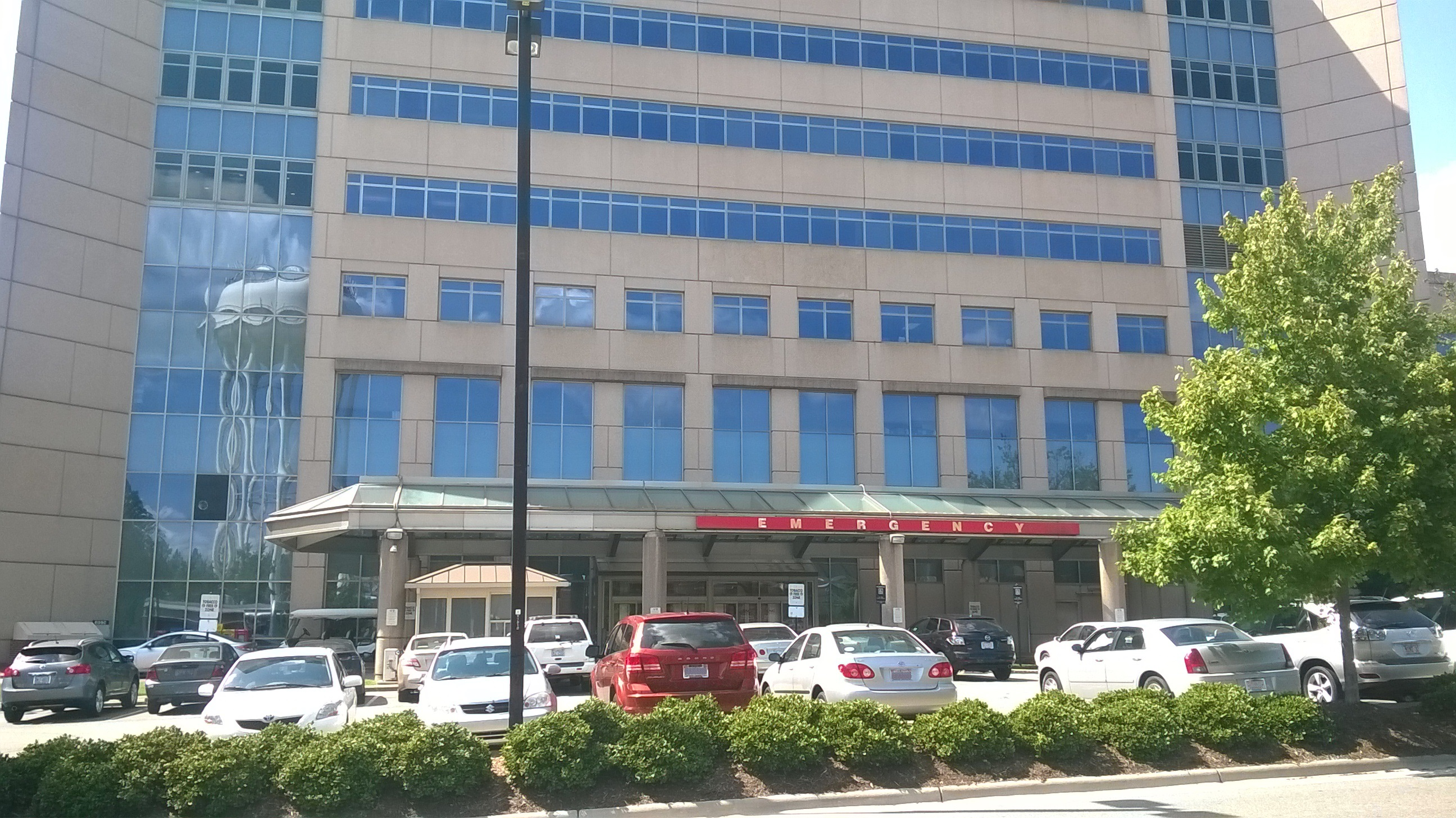
UNC Memorial Hospital Emergency Department

=== Patient care units ===
NC Memorial Hospital has a variety of patient care units to serve all types of patients.

- 26-bed acute care (3 west)
- 12-bed acute care (4 west)
- 15-bed transplant unit (5 west)
- 28-bed orthopedic and trauma (5 tower)
- 31-bed pulmonary and infectious disease (6 tower)
- 31-bed geriatric unit (8 tower)
- 25-bed intermediate coronary care unit (3 anderson)
- 20-bed acute care surgery (4 anderson north)
- 12-bed cardio acute care (5 anderson)
- 15-bed burn and wound (5 east)
- 14-bed GI surgery (6 east)
- 34-bed neuro acute care (6 neuro)
- 13-bed antepartum unit (3 women's)
- 28-bed maternity care (5 women's)
- 22-bed gyn oncology (6 women's)
- 13-bed cardio step-down unit
- 13-bed cardiac intensive care unit
- 9-bed cardiothoracic intensive care unit
- 24-bed medical progressive care
- 30-bed medical intensive care
- 18-bed intermediate surgical care
- 16-bed surgical and trauma intensive care
- 16-bed neuro intensive care
- 21-bed burn unit
- 80-bed emergency department

=== Rankings ===
2021 U.S. News & World Report NC Memorial Hospital
Specialty	Rank (In the U.S.)	Score (Out of 100)
Cancer	High Performing	46.7
Cardiology and Heart Surgery	N/A	42.1
Diabetes & Endocrinology	High Performing	52.8
Ear Nose and Throat	#36	64.4
Gastroenterology & GI Surgery	High Performing	64.4
Geriatrics	N/A	62.1
Gynecology	#18	73.2
Nephrology	#39	57.0
Neurology & Neurosurgery	N/A	47.9
Orthopedics	N/A	41.2
Psychiatry	High Performing	3.6%
Pulmonology & Lung Surgery	N/A	54.9
Rheumatology	N/A	2.9%
Urology	High Performing	59.8

== North Carolina Children's Hospital ==
North Carolina Children's Hospital

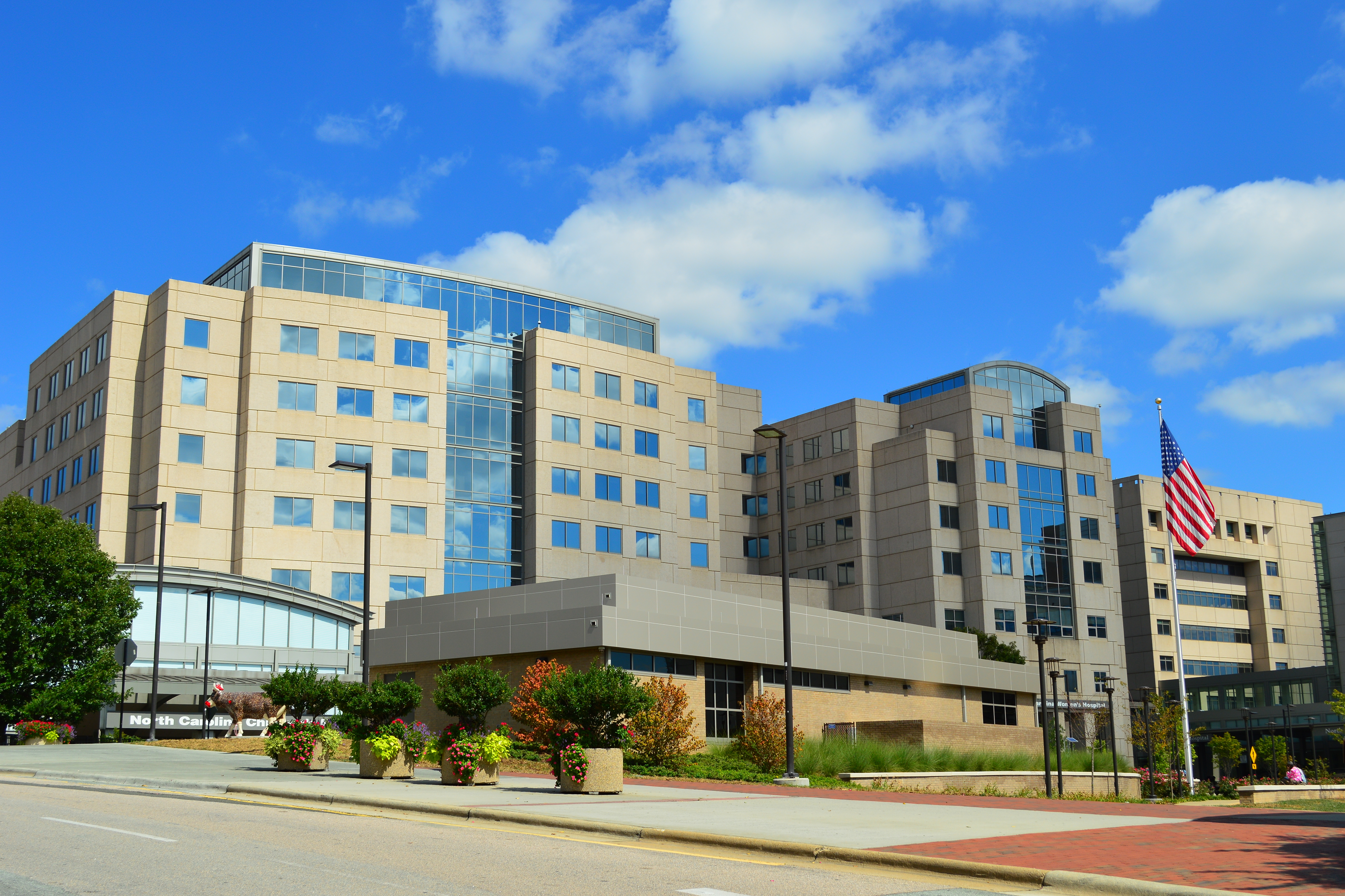
- N.C. Children's Hospital (Left), N.C. Women's Hospital (Right)

Organisation
- Type: Children's Hospital
- Affiliated university: UNC School of Medicine

Services
- Emergency department: Level 1 Pediatric Trauma Center
- Beds: 158

History
- Founded: 2001

Links
- Website: uncchildrens.org

North Carolina Children's Hospital (NCCH) is a pediatric acute care hospital located within UNC Medical Center in Chapel Hill, North Carolina. The hospital has 158 beds. It is affiliated with The University of North Carolina School of Medicine, and is a member of UNC Health. The hospital provides comprehensive pediatric specialties and subspecialties to infants, children, teens, and young adults aged 0–21 throughout North Carolina. North Carolina Children's Hospital features the only pediatric Level 1 Trauma Center in the region, and 1 of 3 in the state.

=== History ===
The two buildings; the women's and children's buildings were unveiled on September 8, 2001, and officially opened in early 2002.

=== Patient Care Units ===
In addition to the units at the neighboring adult hospital, UNC Children's has their own pediatric units for patients age 0-21.

- 24-bed inpatient unit (6 children's) - General Inpatient Care
- 24-bed Children's Intermediate Care Center (5 children's) - Severity Below ICU But Greater Than Inpatient Care
- 24-bed Pediatric Surgery Acute Care (7 children's) - Pediatric Trauma, Surgery and Burns.
- 58-bed Newborn Critical Care Center - Intensive Care For Neonates
- 20-bed Pediatric Intensive Care Unit - Care For Critical Pediatric Patients
- 8-bed Children's Short Stay Unit - Care For Patients Requiring Less Than 24 Hours Of Care

=== Heart surgeries ===
In May 2019, it was revealed children with certain heart conditions had been dying at higher than expected rates after undergoing heart surgery at the hospital. The concern was raised in 2017 by multiple cardiologists employed at the hospital. The cardiologists repeatedly raised concerns about the cardiac surgery program and even began referring patients to other hospitals in the region. The cardiologists were concerned that the hospital was taking on cases that it could not handle. When the hospital released their mortality rates, the results showed that the hospital had a higher cardio surgery death rate than nearly all of the other children's hospitals nationwide. In July, the North Carolina secretary of health called for the investigation into the allegations raised by The New York Times. The hospital suspended its most complex heart surgeries to help restore confidence with the program; questions were also raised about the role of Dr. William L. Roper, then the head of UNC Health Care. The hospital made changes such as firing administrators and changing doctors. State and federal inspectors have since confirmed that the hospital's cardio program is very different than years ago. The hospital has since cautiously resumed complex pediatric heart surgeries.

=== Rankings ===
The hospital is ranked nationally in 9 specialties and ranked #2 in North Carolina.

2023 U.S. News & World Report NC Children's Hospital
Specialty	Rank (In the U.S.)	Score (Out of 100)
Neonatology	#27	70.7
Pediatric Cancer	#36	69.6
Pediatric Cardiology & Heart Surgery	N/A	N/A
Pediatric Diabetes & Endocrinology	#24	75.3
Pediatric Gastroenterology & GI Surgery	#38	71.4
Pediatric Nephrology	#45	70.9
Pediatric Neurology & Neurosurgery	#20	82.3
Pediatric Orthopedics	#21	71.2
Pediatric Pulmonology & Lung Surgery	#15	83.8
Pediatric Urology	#23	77.8

== North Carolina Cancer Hospital ==
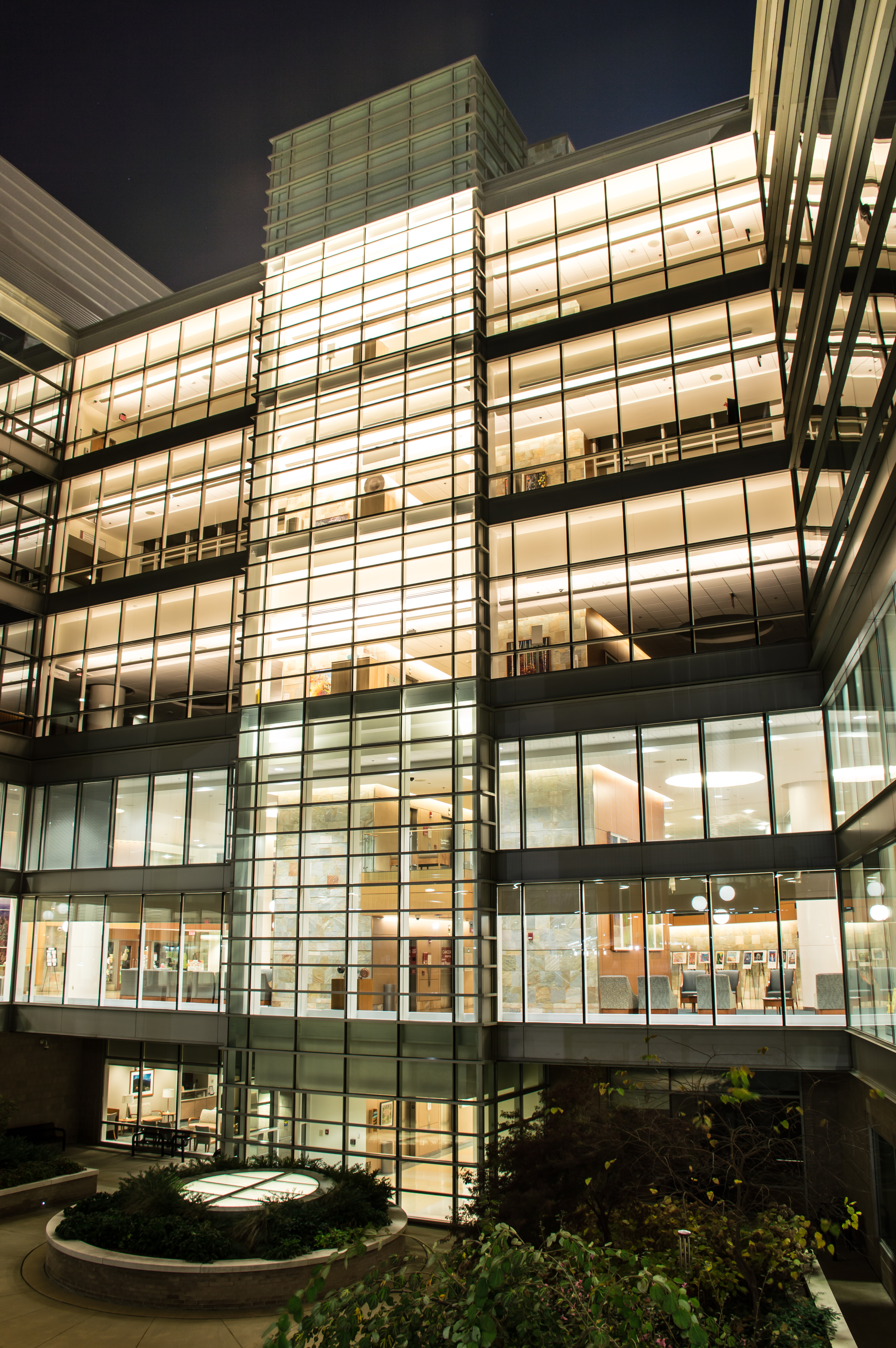
The front of the N.C. Cancer Hospital at night.

The North Carolina Cancer Hospital is a public adult and pediatric cancer hospital. The hospital is the flagship site for UNC Cancer care and is the clinical home of the Lineberger Cancer Center. The 315,000 sq^{2} is the state's only public cancer hospital. The new hospital opened in 2009 to replace the former 60-year-old building that used to be a tuberculosis sanatorium. The center is one of 71 comprehensive cancer's nationwide and 1 of 3 in North Carolina. The new hospital was created with $180 million in funds from the North Carolina State government. The Cancer Hospital also includes a new Clinical Trials Unit allowing the hospital to access more than $147 million in grants from the National Institutes of Health that were previously unavailable. The hospital offers its pediatric services in conjunction with the adjacent N.C. Children's Hospital.

=== Facilities ===
- 101 examination, treatment, consultation, and procedure rooms
- 65 inpatient beds for medical oncology and bone marrow transplant
- 70 chemotherapy infusion rooms
- 1 CT Scanner and 2 General Radiology Rooms, 2 PET/CT Scanners
- 21 new Emergency Department treatment spaces to supplement existing ED space in the N.C. Neurosciences Hospital
- The facility features a telemedicine conference center

=== Patient care units ===
- 24-bed surgical oncology(and also ENT) (7 neuro)
- 34-bed general oncology (4 oncology)
- 24-bed bone marrow transplant unit

=== Awards ===
Grouped in with the UNC Medical Center, the hospital ranks #27 nationwide in cancer hospitals on the 2020 U.S. News & World Report hospital rankings.

In 2014 and 2017, Becker's Hospital Review ranked the hospital as one of the "100 hospitals and health systems with great oncology programs."

In 2016, Blue Cross and Blue Shield of North Carolina designated N.C. Cancer Hospital a Blue Distinction® Center+ in complex & rare cancers.
