= UNC Health =

Hospital in North Carolina, United States

- Trade name: UNC Health
- Type: not-for-profit
- Industry: Health care
- Founded: 1998; 28 years ago Chapel Hill, North Carolina, U.S.
- Headquarters: Chapel Hill, North Carolina
- Area served: North Carolina and Virginia
- Key people: Cristy Page (CEO)
- Parent: University of North Carolina System
- Website: unchealth.org

UNC Health is a not-for-profit medical system owned by the State of North Carolina and based in Chapel Hill, North Carolina at the University of North Carolina at Chapel Hill. It provides services throughout the Research Triangle and North Carolina. UNC Health was created in 1998, when the North Carolina General Assembly passed legislation that established the UNC Health Care System, bringing under one entity UNC Hospitals and the clinical programs of the UNC School of Medicine. In 2024, the system reported over 87,000 discharges and over 250,000 emergency department visits.

== History ==
The first hospital in what would later become UNC Hospitals opened on September 2, 1952. Named N.C. Memorial Hospital, it was established to honor North Carolinians who died while serving in World War II. The hospital was built as part of the Good Health Plan, an initiative launched by the state in the late 1940s to improve the health of North Carolinians.

Today, UNC Health consists of UNC Hospitals (Chapel Hill, NC), UNC Health Rex (Raleigh, NC), Chatham Hospital (Siler City, NC), Caldwell Memorial Hospital (Lenoir, NC), Johnston Health (Smithfield, NC), Pardee Hospital (Hendersonville, NC), Nash Health Care (Rocky Mount, NC), Wayne Memorial Hospital (Goldsboro, NC), UNC Lenoir Health Care (Kinston, NC), and UNC Health Rockingham (Eden, NC). In addition, UNC Health Care includes UNC Faculty Physicians (the practice group serving UNC Hospitals) and the UNC Physicians Network (a wholly owned subsidiary of UNC Health that owns and operates community-based practices that provide primary and specialty care throughout the North Carolina Triangle area.). UNC Hospitals include the NC Memorial Hospital, NC Children's Hospital, NC Women's Hospital, NC Cancer Hospital (clinical home of the UNC Lineberger Comprehensive Cancer Center), and the NC Neurosciences Hospital. Construction of a new $20 million office/hospital complex in Hillsborough, NC began in April 2011. As of July 2015, many services are now offered at the Hillsborough campus, including an emergency department and general surgery.

UNC Health and Charlotte-based Atrium Health announced August 31, 2017 that the systems had signed a letter of intent (LOI) to join their clinical enterprises and collaborate to enhance medical education and research. Under the LOI, the two organizations agreed to start a period of exclusive negotiations, with the goal of entering into final agreements by the end of the year. Their goal is to form a new organization through a joint operating company structure. Executives of both systems said a larger network would improve the ability to negotiate with insurance companies and provide other cost reductions. The letter of intent signed August 30, 2017 said that if the proposed partnership was approved, UNC Health Care CEO Bill Roper would become executive chairman and Carolinas Healthcare CEO Gene Woods would be CEO of the new organization. However, questions about who would control the combined system led Atrium to back out of talks in March 2018.

On October 25, 2017, Wake Forest Baptist Medical Center and High Point Regional Health System announced that Wake Forest Baptist would take over High Point Regional, a part of UNC Health since 2013, by Summer 2018. In November 2017, UNC Health purchased Morehead Memorial Hospital of Eden, North Carolina and rebranded it as UNC Health Rockingham in 2018.

== Hospitals ==
UNC Health hospitals locations
- Johnston Clayton
- Hillsborough
- Rex Holly Springs

Notable UNC hospitals include:

=== UNC Medical Center ===
UNC Medical Center (UNCMC) is a 932-bed non-profit, nationally ranked, public, research and academic medical center located in Chapel Hill, North Carolina, providing tertiary care for the Research Triangle, surrounding areas and North Carolina. The medical center is the flagship campus of the UNC Health Care Health System and is made up of four hospitals that include the North Carolina Memorial Hospital, North Carolina Children's Hospital, North Carolina Neurosciences Hospital, North Carolina Women's Hospital, and the North Carolina Cancer Hospital. UNCMC is affiliated with the University of North Carolina School of Medicine. UNCMC features an ACS designated adult and pediatric Level 1 Trauma Center and has a helipad to handle medevac patients.

=== UNC Rex Healthcare ===
UNC Rex Hospital is a general hospital located in Raleigh, North Carolina. It is the capital city's oldest hospital, founded by a bequest from John T. Rex (1771–1839), a local tanner, planter, and owner of enslaved families, and named in his honor. Originally located on what is now Dorothea Dix campus, and later on St. Mary's Street, Rex is now located in west Raleigh at the corner of Blue Ridge Road and Lake Boone Trail. Rex Health Care's services include oncology, heart and vascular, surgical services (including bariatric, heartburn, GI, orthopedic, neuro, and spinal), rehabilitation, emergency department, urgent care, women's services, and wound healing.

Rex is a member of the UNC Health Care system, a non-profit integrated health care system, owned by the state of North Carolina and based in Chapel Hill, North Carolina.

Rex is located just 2 miles from the Lenovo Center, and is the official healthcare provider of the Carolina Hurricanes and NC State Wolfpack.

=== UNC Health Rockingham ===
UNC Health Rockingham is a not-for-profit hospital located in Eden, North Carolina, United States. Founded in 1960, the hospital has 108 beds and serves residents in Rockingham County, Piedmont Triad, as well as in the Southern Virginia area. The hospital staffs over 117 physicians and offers inpatient, outpatient and preventive healthcare services. Formally known as Morehead Memorial Hospital, the hospital was acquired and purchased by UNC Health in 2017 and was soon rebranded as UNC Health Rockingham in 2018. Tabitha Brown (1979), actress and social media personality, was a notable birth.

=== Nash UNC Health Care ===
Nash UNC Health Care, opened in 1971 as Nash General Hospital, is a general hospital located in Rocky Mount, North Carolina. It was the first all-private-room hospital in North Carolina. It is home to a women's center, a cardiovascular services department, and a critical care unit. A subunit of the hospital, known as Nash Day Hospital, opened in 1984 as a free-standing outpatient surgery center. The hospital also operates the Bryant T. Aldridge Rehabilitation Center in honor of Kinston, North Carolina native Bryant T. Aldridge, the first manager of Nash General, which opened in 1999, and the Coastal Plain Hospital, a mental health facility. In 2004, the hospital opened a state-of-the-art Surgery Pavilion, followed in 2014 by the opening of a new Emergency Department and a new Nash Heart Center. In 2014, Nash Health Care became affiliates with UNC Health Care. In May 2016, the hospital opened the doors of its new $25 million Nash Women's Center.

Nash is a member of the UNC Health Care system, a non-profit integrated health care system, owned by the state of North Carolina and based in Chapel Hill, North Carolina.

=== UNC Lenoir Health Care ===
UNC Health Lenoir is a not-for-profit hospital located in Kinston, North Carolina. The hospital is licensed for 199 beds and serves the residents of Lenoir, Greene and Jones and other surrounding counties. The hospital is staffed with over 100 physicians. The hospital offers inpatient, outpatient and preventive healthcare services. In addition, the hospital offers free educational health programs, seminars, and screenings. General services include general medical, surgical, obstetrical and gynecological care. Specialized services include cardiology, pulmonology, oncology, radiology, urology, orthopedics and orthopedic sports medicine, bariatric surgery and vascular surgery

In 1986, the Lenoir Memorial Foundation was established.

In 1965, the old Lenoir Memorial Hospital was outdated and too small to serve the growing community of Kinston and Lenoir County, and expansion or renovation was deemed unsatisfactory. In June 1973, a new $11 million, 435-bed facility opened.

=== UNC Health Blue Ridge ===
UNC Health Blue Ridge is a not-for-profit hospital located in Morganton, North Carolina, United States, and serving Burke County, North Carolina. The hospital anchors UNC Health Blue Ridge system of healthcare providers that includes other facilities such as Valdese, Grace Ridge Retirement Community, Phifer Wellness Center and other physician practices.

=== Wayne UNC Health Care ===
UNC Health Wayne is a nonprofit hospital affiliate of UNC Health, a health care system in North Carolina and the largest private employer in Wayne County. Its name changed from Wayne Memorial Hospital when it entered into a management agreement with UNC Health in 2015 and in 2022, the hospital changed its name from Wayne UNC Health Care to UNC Health Wayne.

With the retirement of J. William "Bill" Paugh, FACHE, Robert A. “Bob” Enders Jr., FACHE, served as interim President & CEO in 2016, Janie Jaberg, RN, FACHE, served as President & CEO from 2016 to 2020, and Jessie L. Tucker III, Ph.D., FACHE, became the corporation and hospital President & CEO in 2020.

In September 2021, Moody's revised the hospital's outlook from negative to stable.

The hospital was recognized as a best maternity care hospital in 2022 and in 2023, UNC Health Wayne earned its highest patient safety and quality ratings in history with a Leapfrog Hospital Safety Grade of "A" and a CMS Star quality rating of 4 out of 5. The hospital also earned first ever certifications and accreditations in stroke, total hip and knee replacement, chest pain as well as platinum chest pain/MI care awards and high performance ratings for heart failure, kidney failure, stroke and COPD in 2022 and 2023.

UNC Health Wayne became a Vizient/AACN Nurse Residency Program site in 2023 and was recognized as a top 12% and largest hospital in Eastern North Carolina with the highest consistent quality and patient safety ratings (4-stars and 6 consecutive A grades).

== See also ==
- List of hospitals in North Carolina
