= List of law enforcement agencies in North Carolina =

Law enforcement agencies in the U.S. state of North Carolina

This is a list of law enforcement agencies in the state of North Carolina.

According to the US Bureau of Justice Statistics' 2008 Census of State and Local Law Enforcement Agencies, the state had 504 law enforcement agencies employing 23,442 sworn police officers, about 254 for each 100,000 residents. As of June 2022, the 2008 report was the latest data available.

== State agencies ==
- Black Mountain Neuro-Medical Treatment Center Police - Black Mountain, North Carolina (NC Department of Health & Human Services)
- Broughton Hospital Police - Morganton, North Carolina (NC Department of Health & Human Services)
- Cherry Hospital Police – Goldsboro, North Carolina (NC Department of Health & Human Services)
- Longleaf Neuro-Medical Treatment Center Police - Wilson, North Carolina (NC Department of Health & Human Services)
- North Carolina Alcohol Law Enforcement
- North Carolina Arboretum Campus Police - Asheville, North Carolina
- North Carolina Department of Agriculture State Fairgrounds Police - Raleigh, North Carolina
- North Carolina Department of Insurance Criminal Investigations Division
- North Carolina Division of Marine Fisheries Marine Patrol
- North Carolina Division of Parks Law Enforcement Rangers
- North Carolina General Assembly Police
- North Carolina State Bureau of Investigation
- North Carolina State Highway Patrol
- North Carolina State Ports Authority Police - Morehead City/Wilmington
- North Carolina Wildlife Resources Commission Law Enforcement
- North Carolina Forest Service, Criminal Investigations Unit
- North Carolina Department of Revenue, Criminal Investigations Unit, Unauthorized Substances, Motor Fuels Investigations
- North Carolina Secretary of State's Office, Securities, Trademarks, Notary
- North Carolina Department of Adult Correction
- North Carolina Supreme Court Police
- O’Berry Neuro-Medical Treatment Center Police - Goldsboro, North Carolina (NC Department of Health & Human Services)

== County agencies ==
Sheriffs have been required in each county of North Carolina since the North Carolina Constitution of 1776. Article VII, Section 2 of the 1971 Constitution of North Carolina gives the authority and qualifications for a sheriff in each county:

- "In each county a Sheriff shall be elected by the qualified voters thereof at the same time and places as members of the General Assembly are elected and shall hold his office for a period of four years, subject to removal for cause as provided by law. No person is eligible to serve as Sheriff if that person has been convicted of a felony against this State, the United States, or another state, whether or not that person has been restored to the rights of citizenship in the manner prescribed by law. Convicted of a felony includes the entry of a plea of guilty; a verdict or finding of guilt by a jury, judge, magistrate, or other adjudicating body, tribunal, or official, either civilian or military; or a plea of no contest, nolo contendere, or the equivalent. (2010-49, s. 1)"

In two counties, Gaston and Mecklenburg counties, the county police have constitutionally mandated county wide responsibilities instead of the sheriff's department.

- Alamance County Sheriff's Department - Graham
- Alexander County Sheriff's Office - Taylorsville
- Alleghany County Sheriff's Department - Sparta
- Anson County Sheriff's Office - Wadesboro
- Ashe County Sheriff's Office - Jefferson
- Avery County Sheriff's Office - Newland
- Beaufort County Sheriff's Office - Washington
- Bertie County Sheriff's Office - Windsor
- Bladen County Sheriff's Office - Elizabethtown
- Brunswick County Sheriff's Office - Bolivia
- Buncombe County Sheriff's Office - Asheville
- Burke County Sheriff's Office - Morganton
- Cabarrus County Sheriff's Office - Concord
- Caldwell County Sheriff's Office - Lenoir
- Camden County Sheriff's Office - Camden
- Carteret County Sheriff's Department - Beaufort
- Caswell County Sheriff's Office - Yanceyville
- Catawba County Sheriff's Office - Newton
- Chatham County Sheriff's Office - Pittsboro
- Cherokee County Sheriff's Office - Murphy
- Chowan County Sheriff's Office - Edenton
- Clay County Sheriff's Office - Hayesville
- Cleveland County Sheriff's Office - Shelby
- Columbus County Sheriff's Office - Whiteville
- Craven County Sheriff's Office - New Bern
- Cumberland County Sheriff's Office - Fayetteville
- Currituck County Sheriff's Office - Currituck
- Dare County Sheriff's Office - Manteo
- Davidson County Sheriff's Office - Lexington
- Davie County Sheriff's Office - Mocksville
- Duplin County Sheriff's Office - Kenansville
- Durham County Sheriff's Office - Durham
- Edgecombe County Sheriff's Office - Tarboro
- Forsyth County Sheriff's Office - Winston-Salem
- Franklin County Sheriff's Office - Louisburg
- Gaston County Police Department - Gastonia
- Gaston County Sheriff's Office - Gastonia
- Gates County Sheriff's Department - Gatesville
- Graham County Sheriff's Department - Robbinsville
- Granville County Sheriff's Office - Oxford
- Greene County Sheriff's Office - Snow Hill
- Guilford County Sheriff's Office - Greensboro
- Halifax County Sheriff's Office - Halifax
- Harnett County Sheriff's Office - Lillington
- Haywood County Sheriff's Office - Waynesville
- Henderson County Sheriff's Department - Hendersonville
- Hertford County Sheriff's Office - Winton
- Hoke County Sheriff's Office - Raeford
- Hyde County Sheriff's Office - Swan Quarter
- Iredell County Sheriff's Office - Statesville
- Jackson County Sheriff's Office - Sylva
- Johnston County Sheriff's Office - Smithfield
- Jones County Sheriff's Office - Trenton
- Lee County Sheriff's Office - Sanford
- Lenoir County Sheriff's Office - Kinston
- Lincoln County Sheriff's Office - Lincolnton
- Macon County Sheriff's Office - Franklin
- Madison County Sheriff's Department - Marshall
- Martin County Sheriff's Office - Williamston
- McDowell County Sheriff's Department - Marion
- Mecklenburg County Sheriff's Office - Charlotte
- Mitchell County Sheriff's Office - Bakersville
- Montgomery County Sheriff's Office - Troy
- Moore County Sheriff's Department - Carthage
- Nash County Sheriff's Office - Nashville
- New Hanover County Sheriff's Office - Castle Hayne
- Northampton County Sheriff's Office - Jackson
- Onslow County Sheriff's Office - Jacksonville
- Orange County Sheriff's Office - Hillsborough
- Pamlico County Sheriff's Department - Bayboro
- Pasquotank County Sheriff's Office - Elizabeth City
- Pender County Sheriff's Office - Burgaw
- Perquimans County Sheriff's Department - Hertford
- Person County Sheriff's Department - Roxboro
- Pitt County Sheriff's Office - Greenville
- Polk County Sheriff's Office - Columbus
- Randolph County Sheriff's Office - Asheboro
- Richmond County Sheriff's Office - Rockingham
- Robeson County Sheriff's Department - Lumberton
- Rockingham County Sheriff's Office - Wentworth
- Rowan County Sheriff's Office - Salisbury
- Rutherford County Sheriff's Department - Rutherfordton
- Sampson County Sheriff's Office - Clinton
- Scotland County Sheriff's Office - Laurinburg
- Stanly County Sheriff's Office - Albemarle
- Stokes County Sheriff's Department - Danbury
- Surry County Sheriff's Office - Dobson
- Swain County Sheriff's Office - Bryson City
- Transylvania County Sheriff's Office - Brevard
- Tyrrell County Sheriff's Office - Columbia
- Union County Sheriff's Office - Monroe
- Vance County Sheriff's Department - Henderson
- Wake County Sheriff's Office - Raleigh
- Warren County Sheriff's Office - Warrenton
- Washington County Sheriff's Office - Plymouth
- Watauga County Sheriff's Office - Boone
- Wayne County Sheriff's Office - Goldsboro
- Wilkes County Sheriff's Office - Wilkesboro
- Wilson County Sheriff's Office - Wilson
- Yadkin County Sheriff's Office - Yadkinville
- Yancey County Sheriff's Office - Burnsville

== City/town agencies ==
- Aberdeen Police Department
- Ahoskie Police Department
- Albemarle Police Department
- Andrews Police Department
- Angier Police Department
- Apex Police Department
- Archdale Police Department
- Asheboro Police Department
- Asheville Police Department
- Atlantic Beach Police Department
- Aulander Police Department
- Aurora Police Department
- Ayden Police Department
- Badin Police Department
- Bailey Police Department
- Bald Head Island Public Safety
- Bakersville Police Department
- Banner Elk Police Department
- Beaufort Police Department
- Beech Mountain Police Department
- Belhaven Police Department
- Belmont Police Department
- Benson Police Department
- Bessemer City Police Department
- Bethel Police Department
- Beulaville Police Department
- Biltmore Forest Police Department
- Biscoe Police Department
- Black Creek Police Department
- Black Mountain Police Department
- Bladenboro Police Department
- Blowing Rock Police Department
- Boiling Spring Lakes Police Department
- Boiling Springs Police Department
- Bolton Police Department
- Boone Police Department
- Boonville Police Department
- Brevard Police Department
- Bridgeton Police Department
- Broadway Police Department
- Brookford Police Department
- Bryson City Police Department
- Bunn Police Department
- Burgaw Police Department
- Burlington Police Department
- Burnsville Police Department
- Butner Public Safety
- Candor Police Department
- Canton Police Department
- Cape Carteret Police Department
- Carolina Beach Police Department
- Carrboro Police Department
- Carthage Police Department
- Cary Police Department
- Caswell Beach Police Department
- Catawba Police Department
- Chadbourn Police Department
- Chapel Hill Police Department
- Charlotte-Mecklenburg Police Department
- Cherryville Police Department
- China Grove Police Department
- Chocowinity Police Department
- Claremont Police Department
- Clarkton Police Department
- Clayton Police Department
- Cleveland Police Department
- Clinton Police Department
- Clyde Police Department
- Coats Police Department
- Columbus Police Department
- Concord Police Department
- Conover Police Department
- Conway Police Department
- Cornelius Police Department
- Cramerton Police Department
- Creedmoor Police Department
- Dallas Police Department
- Davidson Police Department
- Denton Police Department
- Dobson Police Department
- Drexel Police Department
- Duck Police Department
- Dunn Police Department
- Durham Police Department
- East Bend Police Department
- East Spencer Police Department
- Eden Police Department
- Edenton Police Department
- Elizabeth City Police Department
- Elizabethtown Police Department
- Elkin Police Department
- Ellerbe Police Department
- Elon Police Department
- Emerald Isle Police Department
- Enfield Police Department
- Erwin Police Department
- Fair Bluff Police Department
- Fairmont Police Department
- Farmville Police Department
- Fayetteville Police Department
- Fletcher Police Department
- Forest City Police Department
- Four Oaks Police Department
- Foxfire Village Police Department
- Franklin Police Department
- Franklinton Police Department
- Fremont Police Department
- Fuquay-Varina Police Department
- Garner Police Department
- Garysburg Police Department
- Gastonia Police Department
- Gibsonville Police Department
- Glen Alpine Police Department
- Goldsboro Police Department
- Graham Police Department
- Granite Falls Police Department
- Granite Quarry Police Department
- Greensboro Police Department
- Greenville Police Department
- Grifton Police Department
- Grover Police Department
- Hamlet Police Department
- Havelock Police Department
- Haw River Police Department
- Henderson Police Department
- Hendersonville Police Department
- Hickory Police Department
- High Point Police Department
- Highlands Police Department
- Hillsborough Police Department
- Holden Beach Police Department
- Holly Ridge Police Department
- Holly Springs Police Department
- Hope Mills Police Department
- Hot Springs Police Department
- Hudson Police Department
- Huntersville Police Department
- Indian Beach Police Department
- Jackson Police Department
- Jacksonville Police Department
- Jefferson Police Department
- Jonesville Police Department
- Kannapolis Police Department
- Kenansville Police Department
- Kenly Police Department
- Kernersville Police Department
- Kill Devil Hills Police Department
- King Police Department
- Kings Mountain Police Department
- Kinston Police Department
- Kitty Hawk Police Department
- Knightdale Police Department
- Kure Beach Police Department
- LaGrange Police Department
- Lake Lure Police Department
- Lake Waccamaw Police Department
- Landis Police Department
- Laurel Park Police Department
- Laurinburg Police Department
- Leland Police Department
- Lenoir Police Department
- Lewiston Woodville Police Department
- Lexington Police Department
- Liberty Police Department
- Lilesville Police Department
- Lillington Police Department
- Lincolnton Police Department
- Littleton Police Department
- Locust Police Department
- Long View Police Department
- Louisburg Police Department
- Lowell Police Department
- Lumberton Police Department
- Madison Police Department
- Maggie Valley Police Department
- Magnolia Police Department
- Maiden Police Department
- Manteo Police Department
- Marion Police Department
- Marshall Police Department
- Mars Hill Police Department
- Marshville Police Department
- Matthews Police Department
- Maxton Police Department
- Mayodan Police Department
- Maysville Police Department
- Mebane Police Department
- Micro Police Department
- Middlesex Police Department
- Mint Hill Police Department
- Misenheimer Police Department
- Monroe Police Department
- Montreat Police Department
- Mooresville Police Department
- Morehead City Police Department
- Morganton Public Safety
- Morrisville Police Department
- Mount Airy Police Department
- Mount Gilead Police Department
- Mount Holly Police Department
- Mount Olive Police Department
- Murfreesboro Police Department
- Murphy Police Department
- Nags Head Police Department
- Nashville Police Department
- Navassa Police Department
- New Bern Police Department
- Newland Police Department
- Newport Police Department
- Newton Police Department
- Newton Grove Police Department
- Norlina Police Department
- North Topsail Beach Police Department
- North Wilkesboro Police Department
- Northwest Police Department
- Norwood Police Department
- Oakboro Police Department
- Oak Island Police Department
- Ocean Isle Beach Police Department
- Old Fort Police Department
- Oriental Police Department
- Oxford Police Department
- Parkton Police Department
- Pembroke Police Department
- Pikeville Police Department
- Pilot Mountain Police Department
- Pine Knoll Shores Police Department
- Pine Level Police Department
- Pinebluff Police Department
- Pinehurst Police Department
- Pinetops Police Department
- Pineville Police Department
- Pink Hill Police Department
- Pittsboro Police Department
- Plymouth Police Department
- Polkton Police Department
- Princeton Police Department
- Raeford Police Department
- Raleigh Police Department
- Randleman Police Department
- Ranlo Police Department
- Red Springs Police Department
- Reidsville Police Department
- Rhodhiss Police Department
- Richlands Police Department
- River Bend Police Department
- Rich Square Police Department
- Roanoke Rapids Police Department
- Robbins Police Department
- Robersonville Police Department
- Rockingham Police Department
- Rockwell Police Department
- Rocky Mount Police Department
- Rolesville Police Department
- Rose Hill Police Department
- Rowland Police Department
- Roxboro Police Department
- Rutherfordton Police Department
- Saint Pauls Police Department
- Salisbury Police Department
- Saluda Police Department
- Sanford Police Department
- Scotland Neck Police Department
- Seaboard Police Department
- Seagrove Police Department
- Selma Police Department
- Seven Devils Public Safety Department
- Shallotte Police Department
- Sharpsburg Police Department
- Shelby Police Department
- Siler City Police Department
- Simpson Police Department
- Smithfield Police Department
- Snow Hill Police Department
- Southern Pines Police Department
- Southern Shores Police Department
- Southport Police Department
- Sparta Police Department
- Spencer Police Department
- Spindale Police Department
- Spring Hope Police Department
- Spring Lake Police Department
- Spruce Pine Police Department
- Stallings Police Department
- Stanfield Police Department
- Stanley Police Department
- Stantonsburg Police Department
- Star Police Department
- Statesville Police Department
- Stedman Police Department
- Stem Police Department
- Stoneville Police Department
- Sugar Mountain Police Department
- Sunset Beach Police Department
- Surf City Police Department
- Swansboro Police Department
- Sylva Police Department
- Tabor City Police Department
- Tarboro Police Department
- Taylorsville Police Department
- Taylortown Police Department
- Thomasville Police Department
- Topsail Beach Police Department
- Trent Woods Police Department
- Troutman Police Department
- Troy Police Department
- Tryon Police Department
- Valdese Police Department
- Vanceboro Police Department
- Vass Police Department
- Wadesboro Police Department
- Wagram Police Department
- Wake Forest Police Department
- Wallace Police Department
- Walnut Creek Police Department
- Warrenton Police Department
- Warsaw Police Department
- Washington Police Department
- Waxhaw Police Department
- Waynesville Police Department
- Weaverville Police Department
- Weldon Police Department
- Wendell Police Department
- West Jefferson Police Department
- Whispering Pines Police Department
- Whitakers Police Department
- White Lake Police Department
- Whiteville Police Department
- Wilkesboro Police Department
- Williamston Police Department
- Wilmington Police Department
- Wilson Police Department
- Wilson's Mills Police Department
- Windsor Police Department
- Winston-Salem Police Department
- Winterville Police Department
- Winton Police Department
- Woodfin Police Department
- Woodland Police Department
- Wrightsville Beach Police Department
- Yadkinville Police Department
- Yanceyville Police Department
- Youngsville Police Department
- Zebulon Police Department

== College & university agencies ==
- Appalachian State University Police – Boone
- Asheville-Buncombe Technical Community College Police - Asheville
- Barton College - Wilson - police services by Wilson PD (Barton College District)
- Belmont Abbey College Campus Safety and Police – Belmont
- Beaufort County Community College Police - Washington
- Blue Ridge Community College Police Department - Flat Rock
- Brunswick Community College Police - Bolivia, Leland, Carolina Shores, Southport
- Campbell University Department of Campus Safety – Buies Creek - police services by contracted Harnett County SO
- Cape Fear Community College Police - Wilmington
- Carolina University Campus Safety - Winston-Salem
- Catawba College Office of Public Safety – Salisbury
- Chowan University Campus Safety – Murfreesboro
- Davidson College Department of Public Safety and Police - Davidson
- Duke University Police – Durham
- Durham Tech Community College Campus Police - Durham
- East Carolina University Police – Greenville
- Elizabeth City State University's Campus Police – Elizabeth City
- Elon University Campus Police – Elon
- Fayetteville State University Police – Fayetteville
- Forsyth Technical Community College Campus Police – Winston-Salem
- Gardner-Webb University Campus Police – Boiling Springs
- Gaston College Campus Police - Dallas
- Greensboro College Campus Security – Greensboro
- Guilford College Security – Greensboro
- Guilford Technical Community College Campus Police - Jamestown
- High Point University Campus Police – High Point
- Johnson C. Smith University Campus Police – Charlotte
- Lees-McRae College Campus Safety – Banner Elk
- Lenoir-Rhyne College Campus Security – Hickory
- Livingstone College Campus Police & Public Safety - Salisbury
- Louisburg College Campus Safety & Police - Louisburg
- Mars Hill College Campus Security – Mars Hill
- Meredith College Campus Police – Raleigh
- Methodist University Public Safety – Fayetteville
- Montreat College Campus Police - Montreat
- Nash Community College Campus Police - Rocky Mount
- North Carolina A&T State University Department of Police & Public Safety – Greensboro
- North Carolina Central University Police – Durham
- North Carolina State University Police - Raleigh
- North Carolina Wesleyan College Police - Greensboro
- Pfeiffer University – (Village of Misenheimer Police) - Misenheimer, Charlotte, Morrisville
- Pitt Community College Campus Police - Greenville
- Queens University of Charlotte Police - Charlotte
- Saint Andrews Presbyterian College Campus Safety and Security – Laurinburg
- St. Augustine's University Campus Police Department - Raleigh
- Salem College Department of Public Safety – Winston-Salem
- Sandhills Community College Police & Public Safety - Pinehurst
- Shaw University Campus Police - Raleigh
- Southeastern Community College Campus Police - Whiteville
- Surry Community College Campus Police - Dobson
- University of Mount Olive Campus Safety - Mount Olive
- University of North Carolina at Asheville Campus Police – Asheville
- University of North Carolina at Chapel Hill Department of Public Safety – Chapel Hill
- University of North Carolina at Charlotte Police – Charlotte
- University of North Carolina at Greensboro Department of Public Safety & Police – Greensboro
- University of North Carolina at Pembroke Police and Public Safety Department – Pembroke
- University of North Carolina School of the Arts Police – Winston-Salem
- University of North Carolina at Wilmington University Police – Wilmington
- Vance-Granville Community College Police - Henderson
- Wayne Community College Campus Police – Goldsboro
- Wake Forest University Police - Winston-Salem
- Wake Technical Community College Police - Raleigh
- Western Carolina University Police - Cullowhee
- Wilkes Community College Police - Wilkesboro
- Wilson Community College Police - Wilson
- Wingate University Campus Safety - Wingate
- Winston-Salem State University Police - Winston-Salem

== Other agencies ==
- Albert J. Ellis Airport (OAJ) Police – Richlands
- Allied Universal Special Police - Charlotte
- Appalachian Regional Healthcare System Police – Boone
- Ashe Memorial Hospital Police - Jefferson
- Asheville Regional Airport (AVL) Department of Public Safety - Asheville
- Atrium Health Police - various areas in NC & GA
- Avery County Public Schools Campus Law Enforcement – Newland
- Biltmore Estates Company Police - Asheville
- Blue Line Special Police - Graham
- Blue Ridge Public Safety - Cashiers/Sapphire Valley area
- Caliber Special Police - Durham
- Capitol Special Police - Raleigh, Wake County, Durham, Durham County, Orange County areas
- CarolinaEast Health System Police - New Bern
- Catawba Valley Medical Center Special Police - Catawba
- Charlotte Douglas International Airport (CLT) Police - Charlotte
- Charlotte-Mecklenburg Schools Police - Charlotte
- Cherokee County Schools Special Police - Cherokee
- Cherokee Tribal Police Department
- Delta Company Police - Morganton
- Down East Protection Systems Company Police - Kinston
- Duke Power Company Police - Huntersville
- ECU Health Police - Greenville, ECU Health Roanoke-Chowan Hospital, Ahoskie; ECU Health Beaufort Hospital, Washington; ECU Health Chowan Hospital, Edenton; ECU Health Bertie Hospital, Windsor; ECU Health Duplin Hospital, Kenansville; ECU Health Edgecombe Hospital, Tarboro; The Outer Banks Hospital, Nags Head (jointly owned with Chesapeake Regional Healthcare); ECU Health North Hospital, Roanoke Rapids
- Elite Police-Special Police - Charlotte
- Enforcement Company Police - Charlotte
- Fort Fisher Company Police - Kure Beach
- FTC Company Police - Charlotte
- G4S Secure Solutions Special Police - Charlotte
- Global One Company Police and Public Safety - Youngsville
- Graham County Schools Company Police - Robbinsville
- King Special Police - Monroe
- Kodiak Company Police - Charlotte
- Lake Royale Company Police - Louisburg
- Lankford Company Police Department, based in Greensboro - sites statewide
- Lenoir Memorial Hospital Company Police - Kinston
- Linville Land Harbor Special Police - Linville
- Moore County Schools Police - Carthage
- Mountain Security Patrol Special Police - Franklin
- N.C. Special Police (A Services Group/ASG) - Fayetteville
- Never Quit Services Company Police - Angier
- New Hanover Regional Medical Center Police - Wilmington
- NightHawk Company Police - Raleigh
- North State Security Group Company Police - Winston-Salem
- NOVA Agency Company Police - Raleigh
- ODS Company Police - Burlington
- On Point Company Police - Raleigh
- OS-NQS Company Police - Angier
- Pacific Unified Company Police - Charlotte
- Piedmont Company Police - Greensboro
- Piedmont Triad International Airport (PTI) Police - Greensboro
- Pinnacle Special Police - Wilmington
- Precision Special Police - Charlotte
- Professional Police Services Inc. - Stanley
- Pyramids Village Special Police - Greensboro
- Raleigh-Durham International Airport (RDU) Police - Wake County
- Richmond County Schools Company Police - Hamlet
- SAS Institute Company Police - Cary
- Sheepdog Company Police - Hickory
- Southeastern Public Safety - Charlotte
- S.P.E.A.R Special Police - Winston-Salem
- State Special Police - McLeansville
- Statewide Company Police - Troy
- UNC Hospitals Police - Chapel Hill - sites statewide
- United Special Police - Morganton
- Office of the United States Marshal for the Eastern District of North Carolina
- Office of the United States Marshal for the Middle District of North Carolina
- Office of the United States Marshal for the Western District of North Carolina
- Wackenhut Company Police - Greensboro, Pitt County
- WakeMed Campus Police and Public Safety - Raleigh
- Williams Company Police - Greensboro
- Wilmington International Airport (ILM) Police - Wilmington
- Yancey County Schools Campus Police - Burnsville

== Disbanded/Defunct agencies ==
- Cooleemee Police Department (Disbanded 12/2022; services moved to Davie County Sheriff's Office)
- Greenevers Police Department (town is now served by the Duplin County Sheriff's Office)
- Harnett Health Care System Company Police - Dunn (Disbanded in 2022)
- Hertford Police Department (Disbanded 2021)
- Lucama Police Department
- Mocksville Police Department (Disbanded in 2021)
- Roseboro Police Department
- Ramseur Police Department (Services are provided by the Randolph County Sheriff's Office until further notice)

Crabtree Valley Mall Police Department (Disbanded in 2020 when mall was sold to foreign investors) went to security department only

- Wingate Police Department (Disbanded due to funding and staffing issues). Now served by the Union County Sheriffs Office.

== See also ==
- NC SBI non-governmental agency list
