= ECU Brody School of Medicine =

Medical school in Greenville, North Carolina, US

Coordinates: 35.60971°N 77.40319°W

- Former name: ECU School of Medicine (1969–1999)
- Motto: Servire (Latin)
- Motto in English: To Serve
- Type: Public Medical School
- Established: 1969
- Parent institution: East Carolina University
- Dean: Michael Waldrum
- Faculty: 451
- Students: 469
- Location: Greenville, North Carolina, US
- Campus: Urban
- Website: medicine.ecu.edu

The Brody School of Medicine (BSOM) at East Carolina University is a public medical school located in Greenville, North Carolina, United States. It offers a Doctor of Medicine program, combined Doctor of Medicine / Master of Public Health and Doctor of Medicine / Master of Business Administration programs, and standalone Doctor of Philosophy and Master of Public Health programs. Brody is a national leader in family medicine, ranking No. 1 in North Carolina and No. 2 nationally in the percentage of graduates who choose careers in family medicine, based on the 2017 American Academy of Family Physicians report on MD-granting medical schools. Brody ranks in the top 10 percent of U.S. medical schools for graduating physicians who practice in the state, practice primary care and practice in rural and underserved areas. Brody graduates currently practice in 83 of North Carolina's 100 counties.

The Brody School of Medicine was first appropriated funds from the General Assembly in 1974. Under the leadership of former Chancellor Leo Warren Jenkins, the first class of 28 students enrolled in 1977. The school's primary mission is "to increase the supply of primary care physicians to serve the state, to enhance the access of minority and disadvantaged students in obtaining a medical education and to improve health status of citizens in eastern North Carolina."

Under the leadership of Dean Michael Waldrum and Executive Dean Jason Higginson, today Brody School of Medicine has a student body of about 470 students and around 450 faculty members and researchers. BSOM organizes research through more than a dozen research centers and institutes, receiving around US $30 million annually in externally funded grants and contracts. BSOM is ranked as a "top medical school" by U.S. News & World Report in primary care, rural medicine, and family medicine.

== History ==
In time, East Carolina University was authorized to establish a health affairs division as a foundation for a medical program, and then a one-year medical school whose participants completed their medical education at the University of North Carolina-Chapel Hill. Finally in 1975, the General Assembly of North Carolina appropriated the funds to establish a four-year medical school at East Carolina University.

The legislature set forth a threefold mission for the ECU School of Medicine: to increase the supply of primary care physicians to serve the state, to improve health status of citizens in eastern North Carolina, and to enhance the access of minority and disadvantaged students to a medical education.

Since 1977, when the first class of 28 students enrolled in the four-year School of Medicine, the institution has grown dramatically in its teaching, research and patient care roles. Today, it is partnered with ECU Health and ECU Health Medical Center. In 1999, it was renamed the Brody School of Medicine at East Carolina University, in recognition of the continuous support of the Brody family, former owners of the Brody's retail chain.

East Carolina University is a pioneer in minimally invasive robotic surgery. On May 3, 2000 at East Carolina's Brody School of Medicine, Dr. Randolph Chitwood performed the first robotic heart valve surgery in North America. Using this technology, surgeons at the school have performed more operations on the heart's mitral valve than any other center in the world by far. Today the Brody School of Medicine is home to a state of the art integrated cardiovascular disease center, The East Carolina Heart Institute at ECU.

== Campus ==
Brody School of Medicine has facilities on the campus of East Carolina University, which is situated in the western side of Greenville, adjacent to ECU Health Medical Center.

The medical school facilities at East Carolina University sits in a complex on the health sciences campus of East Carolina's grounds and includes academic, administrative, research and presentation facilities. BSOM is served by one library, the William E. Laupus Library. BSOM does not offer on-campus housing on the Health Sciences Campus, but the campus is home to a new Student Services Center, which boasts a fitness and wellness center, restaurants and convenience stores, meeting and recreation space and study rooms.

The main facility is the Brody Medical Sciences Building. The Biotechnology Building houses all of the laboratory equipment for the school. Also housed in this building is the Pediatric Outpatient Center. The East Carolina Heart Institute at ECU houses the outpatient center and primary teaching and research location for cardiovascular care. The Family Medicine Center houses the outpatient facility for the Department of Family Medicine. The facility is soon moving to a separate building that will triple the available space. The Health Sciences Building houses the Laupus Library, along with the College of Nursing and College of Allied Health Sciences. The Hardy Building houses the Department of Public Health and Moye Medical Center I houses the General Internal Medicine, Pulmonary and Critical Care and ECU Gastroenterology. Warren Life Sciences Building houses the administrative and research offices.

ECU Health (formerly Vidant Health), is associated with the Brody School of Medicine by means of a long standing affiliation agreement with ECU Health Medical Center (formerly Pitt County Memorial Hospital), ECU Health's 861-bed inpatient facility, acts as the medical school's teaching hospital and "primary teaching site". This facility is located adjacent to the Medical School. ECU Health has other constituent elements that include the Bertie Memorial Hospital in Windsor, Chowan Hospital in Edenton, Duplin General Hospital in Kenansville, Heritage Hospital in Tarboro, The Outer Banks Hospital in Nags Head and Roanoke-Chowan Hospital in Ahoskie. In total, ECU Health, the largest private employer in eastern North Carolina, serves an area with a population of 1.3 million in 29 eastern counties.

== Rankings ==
Brody is ranked No. 1 in North Carolina and No. 2 nationally in the percentage of graduates who choose careers in family medicine, based on the 2017 American Academy of Family Physicians report on MD-granting medical schools. Brody ranks in the top 10 percent of U.S. medical schools for graduating physicians who practice in the state, practice primary care and practice in rural and underserved areas. U.S. News & World Report. They also rank seventh in the rural medicine subcategory by the same magazine. As of 2020, BSOM's ranking is #31 in Primary Care by U.S. News & World Report.

In 2010, graduates were second in the nation for going to family medicine residency, by the American Academy of Family Physicians (AAFP).The AAFP ranked the school second in 2008 and eighth in 2007 for sending their graduates to family medicine residencies.

== Residency and fellowship programs ==
The following are a list of programs sponsored by BSOM and ECU Health Medical Center.

Residency programs	Fellowship programs
Dermatology	Bariatric Surgery*
Emergency medicine	Cardiovascular disease
Family medicine	Child and adolescent psychiatry
Family medicine dental	Cytopathology
Internal medicine	Diabetes*
Internal medicine/Emergency Medicine	Emergency Medicine Transport*
Internal medicine/Psychiatry	Family Medicine Women's Health*
Internal medicine/Pediatrics	Geriatric medicine
Obstetrics and gynecology	Hematology and oncology
Pathology-anatomic and clinical	Infectious disease
Pediatrics	Interventional cardiology
Physical medicine and rehabilitation	Minimally Invasive Surgery*
Psychiatry	Neonatal-perinatal medicine
Surgery	Nephrology
	Palliative Care and Hospice Medicine
	Pulmonary disease and critical care medicine
	Sports medicine
	Surgical critical care
	Gastroenterology

*Are non-ACGME programs

== Community involvement ==
=== Greenville Community Shelter Clinic ===
The Greenville Community Shelter Clinic is a free medical clinic run by medical students. Primarily, the patients come from the Greenville Community Shelter. It first opened in 1988 and is housed in the former Agnes Fullilove School in West Greenville. The students have a general, women and pediatric clinic. Also, twice a year a dental van provides services.

=== James D. Bernstein Community Health Center ===
The James D. Bernstein Community Health Center is a $2.8 million, 15,000 sq ft (1,400 m^{2}). facility where low-income, uninsured or medically underserved rural families can receive services tailored just for them with sliding-scale fees.

The program has enabled faculty and students from BSOM and College of Nursing, ECU Physicians Pharmacy Services, Medical Family Therapy, Health Psychology, and Social Work to work and learn side-by-side both in the center and in a partnership with Pitt Community College. It is located in north Greenville, beside the Pitt-Greenville Airport.

=== Pirates Vs. Cancer ===
Pirates Vs. Cancer is a student-led fundraising and advocacy organization that raises money for local children's cancer needs at the James and Connie Maynard Children's Hospital in Greenville, NC. The group was founded at the Brody School of Medicine in December 2016 and officially chartered as a recognized student organization on the East Carolina University campus in the fall of 2017. In 2018, the group formally partnered with the ECU Health Foundation, a 501(c)3 nonprofit associated with the ECU Health System, of which Maynard Children's Hospital is a member.

The organization operates throughout the academic year with fundraising efforts centered around an interdisciplinary head-shaving and hair donation event held each April or May on the ECU Health Sciences Campus. Originally comprising solely medical students, the group's leadership and participants now spans numerous departments and disciplines including students, faculty, and staff from medical, dental, nursing, PA, PT, and various other graduate and undergraduate degree programs. As of the third annual fundraiser on April 5, 2019 the organization has raised a total of $86,050 in gross donations for children's cancer-related needs, with $7,639, $25,008, and $53,403 raised in 2017, 2018, and 2019, respectively. In 2019, over 92% of gross funds raised were allocated directly to meeting local needs at Maynard Children's Hospital.

== ECU NC Statewide Telepsychiatry Program (NC-STeP) ==
The North Carolina Statewide Telepsychiatry Program (NC-STeP) was created in 2013 in response to a growing crisis in North Carolina's emergency departments (EDs) due to the increasing number of mental health visits.

The vision of NC-STeP is to assure that if an individual experiencing an acute behavioral health crisis enters an emergency department or community-based site, s/he will receive timely specialized psychiatric treatment through the statewide network in coordination with available and appropriate clinically relevant community resources.

The objectives of the NC-STeP ED-based program, as defined in the statutes, are: Reduce patient lengths of stay in hospital emergency departments (reduce psych holds to less than 48 hrs.). Reduce the number of Involuntary Commitments (IVC) by eliminating unnecessary admissions. Improve patient transition to aftercare and reduce ED recidivism. Increase efficiency and reduce costs.

=== History ===
Between 2006-2014 mental health and substance abuse-related ED visits increased by 44.1%. Between 2017 and 2019, approximately 12.3% of all adult ED visits were for a mental health-related reason. This surge in patient admissions placed significant strain on emergency departments (EDs), particularly due to prolonged lengths of stay (LOS) for those experiencing mental health crises, especially in EDs lacking psychiatrists. After meeting with respected healthcare organizations, including the U.S. Secretary of Health and Human Services, the Center for Telepsychiatry and e-Behavioral Health (CTeBH) at East Carolina University (ECU), under the leadership of Dr. Sy Saeed, developed a proposal for a telepsychiatry program, the North Carolina Statewide Telepsychiatry Program (https://ncstep.ecu.edu/) (NC-STeP). The proposal was developed in collaboration with a statewide telepsychiatry group representing major healthcare systems, universities, professional organizations, and other stakeholders. At the same time, the legislature in North Carolina, under the Session Law 2013-360, directed the N.C. Department of Health and Human Services' Office of Rural Health and Community Care to oversee and monitor the establishment and administration of a statewide telepsychiatry program at the East Carolina University Center for Telepsychiatry and e-Behavioral Health (ECU-CTeBH).

=== NC-STeP: Benefits of the Portal ===
The NC-STeP telepsychiatry portal supports all health information technology (HIT) functions throughout hospital emergency rooms in North Carolina. One of the main benefits of the Portal is that it provides a single platform for conducting telepsychiatry assessments across EDs and providers, regardless of the electronic health record (EHR) vendor or if there is no EHR available to an ED or provider. The Portal takes advantage of a secure messaging capability of all EHRs that are certified for Stage 2 or higher of the Medicare and Medicaid EHR Incentive Programs. These EHRs can exchange Direct Messages with the Portal containing demographic, clinical, and billing data in a Consolidated Clinical Document Architecture (C-CDA) attached to the message.

NC-STeP has 22 adult primary care sites and 4 primary OB/GYN locations participating in the program. The aim of collaborating with these sites is to assist PCPs who have few or no resources for addressing these patients and who are open to accepting all patients, irrespective of their insurance coverage.

=== Future Directions ===
NC-STeP aims to enhance access to evidence-based mental health practices in other areas with limited access to these services by partnering with practices, healthcare systems, rural health clinics, federally qualified health centers (FQHCs), and other sites. The ultimate goal is to help these sites become self-sufficient in providing mental health resources to their patients and eventually graduate from the program.

The team led by Dr. Saeed in North Carolina is dedicated to advancing the field through the enhancement and dissemination of knowledge. Their efforts have garnered significant national and international attention. Currently, 15-20 states are interested in replicating the NC-STeP model or some variation of it. Many have reached out to the NC-STeP team to explore how they can implement this model within their own states. The innovative telepsychiatry approach developed by NC-STeP is gaining recognition in emerging literature, and the team has created a comprehensive playbook to assist others in launching similar initiatives. Their emphasis is on generating new insights and collaborating with states to tailor their model to fit local needs. The NC-STeP playbook serves as a flexible framework, outlining the key elements necessary for success. Furthermore, NC-STeP has significantly influenced state-level policy, leading to the creation of numerous telemedicine bills. On both national and international platforms, the NC-STeP model has been referenced in various literature and policy discussions. As NC-STeP continues to broaden its impact, it actively shares its successful model with those interested and in need of its services.
