= Chesapeake Regional Healthcare =

Coordinates: 36.7457°N 76.2462°W

Chesapeake Regional Medical Center
- Chesapeake Regional Healthcare

Geography
- Location: Chesapeake, Virginia, United States

Services
- Beds: 310

History
- Opened: 1976

Links
- Lists: Hospitals in Virginia

Chesapeake Regional Medical Center (CRMC) is a hospital accredited by the Joint Commission with an advanced certification as a primary stroke center.

== History ==
During the 1960s, citizens and physicians in Chesapeake, Virginia decided they needed a hospital in the city so they would not have to drive all the way to Norfolk for care. Dr. Stanley Jennings, a Chesapeake physician, began a grassroots effort to establish Chesapeake General Hospital in the fledgling city. In 1966, the Virginia General Assembly created the Chesapeake Hospital Authority which is responsible for the operation of Chesapeake General Hospital. Although the Authority members are appointed by the Chesapeake City Council, it is an autonomous organization with its own enabling legislation.

In the early 1970s, after gaining the cooperation of city officials, community members began door-to-door solicitations and organized benefit sporting events, cake sales, dinners and other fundraisers to raise $1.2 million for the hospital's construction. The city's newly established Chesapeake Housing Authority secured additional funding through a $1 million Hill-Burton federal grant. In 1973, construction began on the hospital. Newly appointed CEO Donald S. Buckley began operating out of a trailer at the construction site on Battlefield Boulevard in the city. Chesapeake General Hospital first opened its doors on Jan. 26, 1976. Donald Buckley served as president/CEO until his retirement in 2005.

In 2005, Chris Mosley was appointed President & CEO of Chesapeake General Hospital. In 2007, Chris Mosley undertook an extensive rebranding and decided on Chesapeake Regional Medical Center, "to more accurately reflect the span of the organization's services and patient base...". When Mosley left CRMC in 2010, Wynn Dixon was selected as his successor.

By 2010, Chesapeake Regional Medical Center had grown to include its 310-bed anchor hospital, the Sidney M. Oman Cancer Center, the Breast Center, the Diagnostic Center of Chesapeake, The BirthPlace, the Surgery Center of Chesapeake, The Lifestyle Center for fitness and health, two sleep centers, an assisted living facility (Cedar Manor Assisted Living Center), home health and hospice program and a physicians' practice group. Chesapeake Regional is also a partner in the 19-bed Outer Banks Hospital in Nags Head, North Carolina, with University Health Systems of Eastern Carolina. In 2010, the emergency department received more than 65,000 visits.

Peter Bastone joined CRMC in 2013 as President & CEO and rebranded the health system to Chesapeake Regional Healthcare in order to better represent the services offered beyond the hospital building.

Chesapeake Regional Medical Center employs approximately 2,400 employees and has a medical staff of 600. It is governed by the Chesapeake Hospital Authority, made up of 11 members appointed by the Chesapeake City Council.

Reese Jackson, JD, MHA, FACHE was installed as President & CEO of Chesapeake Regional Healthcare on December 1, 2016.

In January 2020, Chesapeake Regional began a three-year Master Facility Plan Expansion Project to grow strategically important services to better meet community needs. The 72,000 square foot, $85 million expansion project includes cardiac and surgical additions, renovations to the obstetrical unit and expansion of the Sidney M. Oman cancer treatment center.

In January 2025, a federal grand jury indicted the hospital on charges of healthcare fraud and conspiracy to defraud the government related to its relationship with disgraced doctor Javaid Perwaiz, who was convicted in 2020 on 52 counts of health care fraud and false statements. Perwaiz is serving 59 years in prison. The indictments claimed the hospital granted privileges to Perwaiz from 1984 until his 2019 arrest, despite being aware of the fact another hospital had revoked his privileges due to performing unnecessary surgeries and that he was convicted of two tax fraud felonies in 1996. The indictments also claimed from 2010 until his arrest, the hospital received $18.5 million in reimbursements from Medicare, Medicaid and various health insurance companies as a result of procedures conducted by Perwaiz at their facility. Chesapeake Regional Medical Center has pleaded not guilty and filed a motion to dismiss.
