= Orange County Sheriff's Office =

Orange County Sheriff's Office may refer to:

- Orange County Sheriff's Office (Florida)
- Orange County Sheriff's Office (New York)
- Orange County Sheriff's Office (North Carolina), see List of law enforcement agencies in North Carolina
- Orange County Sheriff's Department, California
