= Durham police =

Durham police may refer to:

- Durham Police Department (North Carolina)
- Durham Regional Police Service in Durham County, Ontario, Canada
- Durham Constabulary in County Durham, England
