= PCMH =

PCMH may refer to:

- Patient-centered medical home
- Pitt County Memorial Hospital
- Pretty Cure Max Heart
