= Belhaven City Hall =

- U.S. National Register of Historic Places
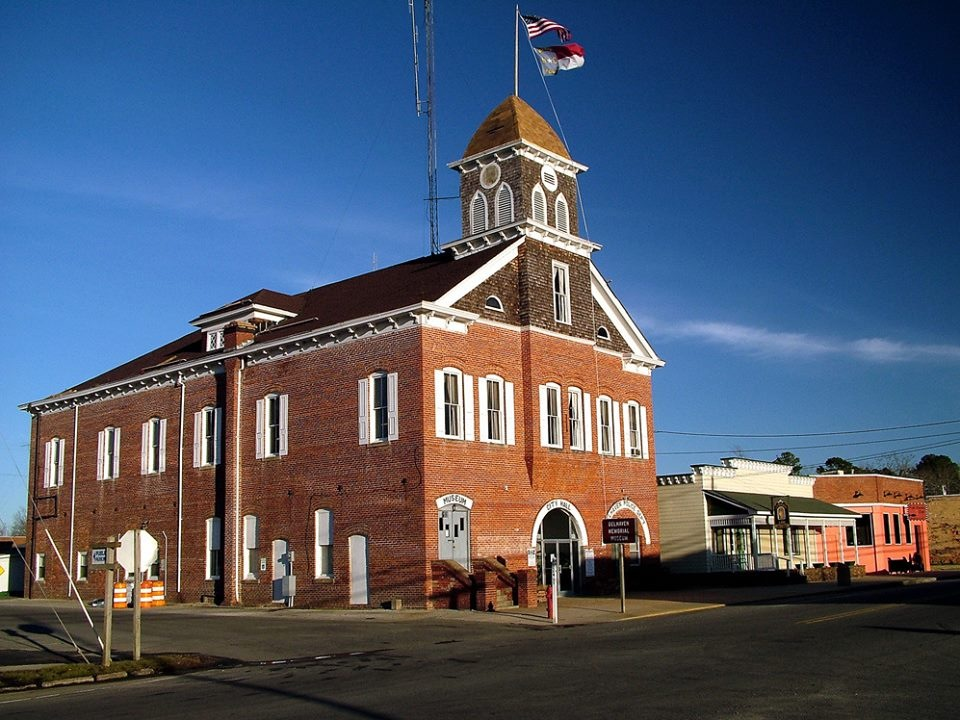
- Front and northwestern side

- Location within North Carolina Location within the United States
- Location: Main St., Belhaven, North Carolina
- Coordinates: 35°32′21″N 76°36′40″W
- Area: less than one acre
- Built: 1910-1911
- Built by: W.T. Kirk, C.F. Doughty
- NRHP reference No.: 81000420
- Added to NRHP: January 27, 1981

Belhaven City Hall is a historic city hall building located at Belhaven, Beaufort County, North Carolina. It was built in 1910–1911, and is a 2 1/2-story, brick building. It features a wood-shingled pediment and belfry. The building's first floor originally housed meat and market stalls.

It was listed on the National Register of Historic Places in 1981.
