= Charlotte-Mecklenburg Police Department =

County police department in North Carolina, United States

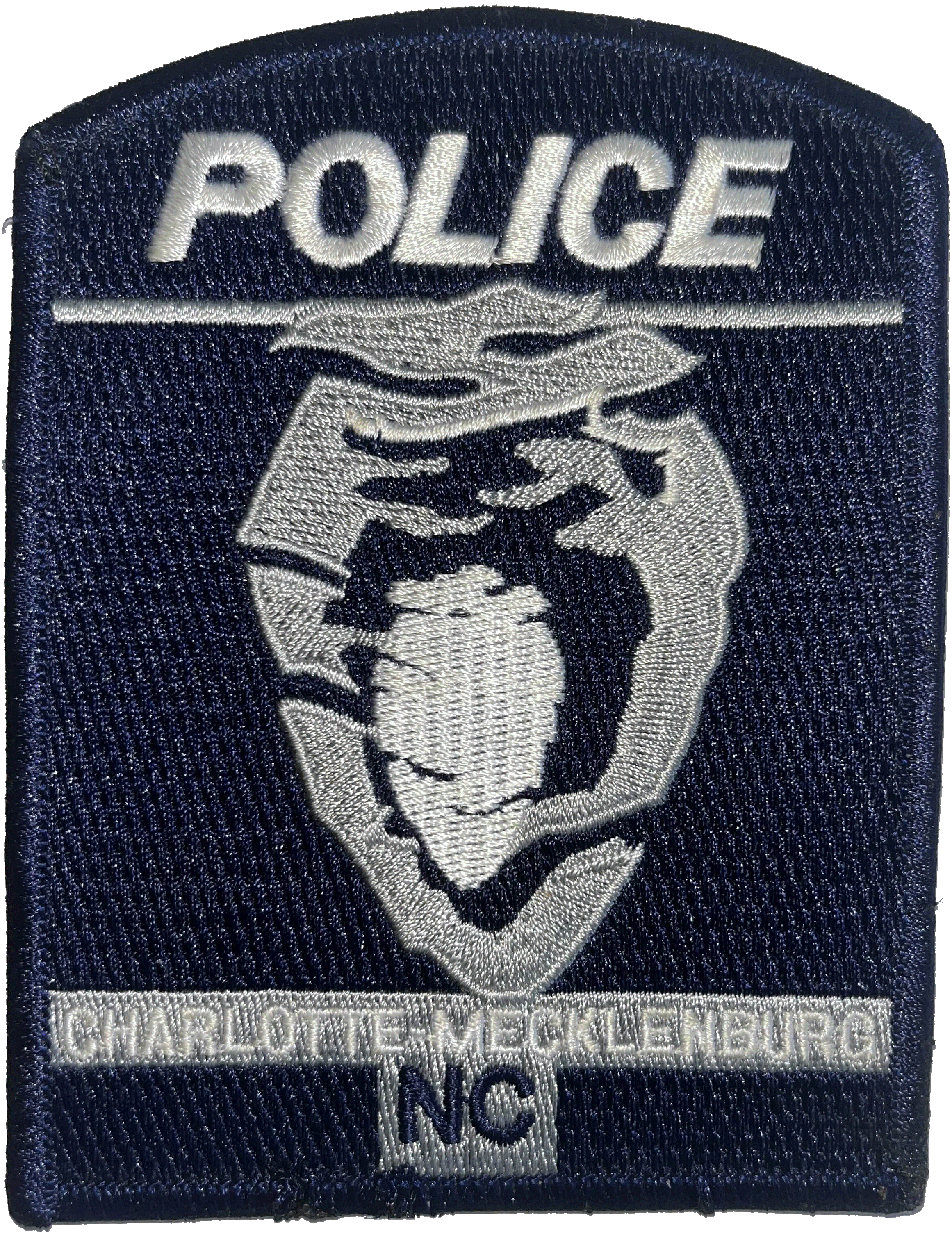
- Common name: Charlotte Police Department
- Abbreviation: CMPD

Agency overview
- Formed: 1993
- Preceding agencies: Charlotte Police; Mecklenburg County Police
- Employees: 2,342 (2020)
- Annual budget: $290 million (2021)

Jurisdictional structure
- Operations jurisdiction: Charlotte, North Carolina, United States
- Governing body: Charlotte City Council
- General nature: Local civilian police

Operational structure
- Headquarters: 601 East Trade Street Charlotte, North Carolina
- Sworn members: 1,982 (2020)
- Unsworn members: 475
- Agency executive: Estella Patterson, Chief of police
- Units: List: Aviation; S.W.A.T.; K-9; Scuba Team; Bomb Squad; Highway Interdiction Traffic Safety; Cyber Crimes; Crime Scene Search; Auxiliary Police; Street Crimes; Bike Unit; Animal Control & Animal Care
- Commands: List: Central; North Tryon; North; Eastway; Metro; Westover; Providence; University City; Steele Creek; South; Independence; Hickory Grove; Freedom

Facilities
- Divisions: 13

Website
- CMPD

The Charlotte-Mecklenburg Police Department (CMPD) is the police department of Mecklenburg County, North Carolina, United States, which includes the City of Charlotte. With 1,633 officers and 525 civilian staff as of 2024, covering an area of 438 square miles (1,130 km^{2}) with a population of 1,000,000+, it is the largest police department between Washington, D.C., and Atlanta, Georgia.

The CMPD is by statute "county police" in that it has jurisdiction anywhere in Mecklenburg County. The unique status of this situation makes the CMPD "metro" police.

The department is currently being led by Estella D. Patterson.Patterson is the first female police chief in Charlotte’s history. she has more than 25 years in law enforcement. Before serving as chief of the Raleigh Police Department, she served in the U.S Army from 1996-2005, she served combat tours in Kosovo and Iraq and reaching the rank of captain.

== History ==
The CMPD was formed in 1993 with the merger of the former Charlotte City Police Department and the Mecklenburg County Rural Police Department. Mecklenburg and neighboring Gaston County were the two counties out of the state's 100 counties to have county police in addition to the sheriff's offices. County police perform law enforcement tasks in the county with police powers anywhere in the county just like the sheriff, but the sheriff primarily handled the courts and jails. The North Carolina General Assembly approved legislation combining the two agencies.

In 2013, press reports indicated that the Citizens Review Board had ruled against citizens complaining of police misconduct in every case brought before the panel in its fourteen-year history.

== Salary ==
The CMPD starting salary for officers is about $59,502 per year before incentives. Officers with a college degree automatically earn more at the start of their careers. New hires may potential receive up to $7,500 as a signing bonus.

Officers may also increase their salaries over time by having military experience, working overtime, and special skill incentives. With experience and added incentives some officers can make over $100,000.

== Organization ==
The CMPD is organized into the Office of the Chief of Police, who is assisted by five deputy chiefs.

Patrol services fall under the Field Services Group, headed by a deputy chief. The Field Services Group is divided into three service areas, each headed by a major. Each service area comprises four to five patrol divisions, each headed by a captain. Each patrol division consists of two response areas, each headed by a lieutenant.

Other groups contain bureaus, headed by majors. Each bureau is also organized into divisions, commanded by captains, and units, commanded by sergeants.

CMPD is home to over 30 specialized units including a SWAT team, Lake Enforcement, Aviation Unit, Bomb Unit, and K9 Unit.

== Personnel ==
In 2020, the department consisted of 475 unsworn and 1,982 sworn personnel, including one chief of police, five deputy chiefs, 14 majors, 35 captains, 45 lieutenants, 157 sergeants, and 1,725 detectives and officers.

Breakdown of the makeup of the rank and file of Charlotte-Mecklenburg Police Department: Break down of personal in the year 2025

- Male: 86%
- Female: 14%
- White: 68%
- Black: 19%
- Hispanic: 8%
- Asian: 5%

== Equipment ==
=== Weapons ===
CMPD officers are issued the Glock 17. Qualified officers may also be equipped with a shotgun and/or patrol rifle (AR-15 style).

Additionally, officers' standard patrol equipment typically consists of Electroshock weapon (commonly referred to as tasers or stun guns), oleoresin capsicum (OC) spray, and a baton. These less-lethal tools are provided to help officers ensure their safety and public safety.

=== Vehicles ===
The department utilizes a variety of vehicles, including but not limited to:

- Chevrolet Caprice
- Dodge Charger
- Ford F-350
- Ford Police Interceptor Sedan (Ford Taurus)
- Ford Police Interceptor Utility (Ford Explorer)

== Rank structure ==
Title	Insignia	Insignia (dress uniform cuff)	Positions
Chief of Police		5 gold stripes	The Chief of Police is in charge of running the entire department.
Deputy Chief		4 gold stripes	Deputy Chiefs are Group COs
Major		3 gold stripes	Majors are in charge of a Bureau or Service Area
Captain		2 gold stripes	Captains are in charge of a Division
Lieutenant		Gold stripe	Lieutenants are in charge of a Response Area
Sergeant			Sergeants are in charge of a Unit
Detective	No insignia		Investigative roles, do not outrank Officers
Police Officer	No Insignia		Handles patrol, responds to calls, and enforces laws.

The insignia of the Chief of Police was two gold stars until 2014, when Chief Rodney D. Monroe upgraded it to four stars.

Former ranks

Title	Insignia	Insignia (dress uniform cuff)	Dates used	Notes
Assistant Chief		4 gold stripes	2017–2020	Created in 2017, in the role of assistant to the Chief of Police. Discontinued by 2020.
Staff Sergeant (Response Area Commander)			2008–2014	Introduced in 2008, response area commanders oversaw response areas within a district, and held the rank of staff sergeant. The rank of response area commander (staff sergeant) served as a stop-gap rank before the rank of lieutenant was officially approved as a replacement. The rank of lieutenant, used by the Charlotte Police Department until the 1990s, was reintroduced in 2011 for response area commanders; 26 sergeants were promoted to lieutenant in January 2012, and by 2013 all response area commanders had been regraded as lieutenants. However, the rank of staff sergeant was retained through 2014, when the remaining holders of the rank were promoted to lieutenant.

== Patrol areas ==
Field Services Patrol Group	Patrol Divisions
Patrol Northeast	University City; North Tryon; Hickory Grove
Patrol Northwest	Freedom; North; Metro
Patrol Southeast	Central; Providence; Independence; Eastway
Patrol Southwest	Westover; Steele Creek; South
