= The Outer Banks Hospital =

Coordinates: 35.9400798°N 75.6175353°W

- ECU Health and Chesapeake Regional Medical Center

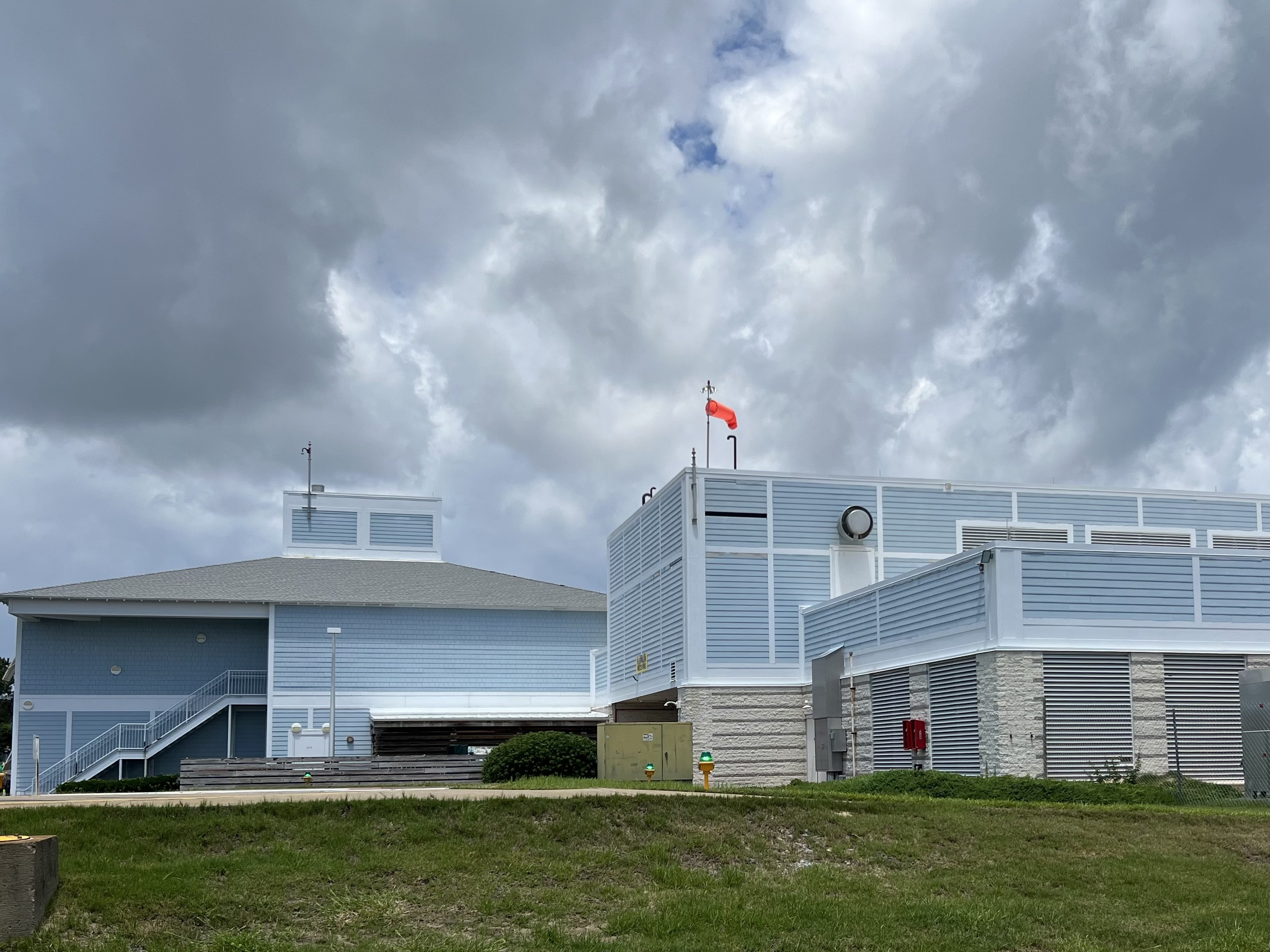

Geography
- Location: Nags Head, Dare County, Outer Banks, North Carolina, United States

Organization
- Type: Community

Services
- Emergency department: Yes
- Beds: 26

Helipads
- Helipad: Yes

History
- Founded: 2002

Links
- Website: OBH Homepage
- Lists: Hospitals in North Carolina

The Outer Banks Hospital (OBH) is a critical access hospital located in Nags Head, Dare County on the Outer Banks. It is 60%/40% partnership of the ECU Health and Chesapeake Regional Healthcare (CRH). The hospital opened in March 2002. The hospital has 21 general hospital beds. It also includes three Shared Inpatient/Ambulatory Surgery, one Endoscopy, and one C-Section operating rooms.

It is the first and only major hospital on the Outer Banks.

== History ==
Members from Pitt County Memorial Hospital (PCMH) in Greenville and Albemarle Hospital (AH) in Elizabeth City met in February 1996 to discuss a joint primary care health facility in Nags Head. The hospital wanted to purchase First Flight Family Practice Center for this undertaking. PCMH would provide two or three additional doctors and AH would provide specialists. Senator Marc Basnight used his political clout to ensure the hospital would receive approval.

In April 1998, PCMH, AH, Chowan Hospital in Edenton and CRMC considered a $15 million hospital in Dare County. AH dropped its support and decided to join up with Sentara Health System (SHS) of Norfolk, Virginia. They wanted to build a $14–$16 million hospital. The two Certificate of Need (CON) were filed on August 12, 1998. PCMH/CRMC wanted a 63,000-square-foot (5,900 m^{2}) facility with 18 beds in Kill Devil Hills. The combined AH and SHS, called HealthCarolina, wanted a 20-bed, $18 million facility at an existing facility at Kitty Hawk. The municipal boards of Kitty Hawk and Southern Shores endorsed the HealthCarolina proposal. The Dare Board of Commissioners, and the municipal boards of Kill Devil Hills and Nags Head endorsed the PCMH/CRMC partnership. Emergency physicians on the Outer Banks backed PCMH/CRMC with its larger proposed emergency room.

On November 28, 1998, the North Carolina Division of Facility Services awarded the CON to the PCMH/CRMC partnership. It would be a $18 million, 18-bed hospital on 14-acres of land on U.S. Route 158 in Kill Devil Hills. In June 1999, PCMH decided to move the hospital location to Nags Head. Nags Head cost around $1.5-$2 million less, had access to sewage and was two feet higher. It opened in March 2002.
