= Salisbury Police Department (North Carolina) =

Jurisdictional structure
- Operations jurisdiction: Salisbury, North Carolina, North Carolina, USA
- General nature: Local civilian police

Operational structure
- Headquarters: Salisbury, North Carolina
- Agency executive: Smith, Chief

Website
- salisburync.gov/Government/Police

The Salisbury Police Department is the primary law enforcement agency in the city of Salisbury, North Carolina in Rowan County. The city has a population of about 34,000. The Salisbury Police Department is a full-service, internationally-accredited police department by the Commission on Accreditation for Law Enforcement Agencies.

== Controversies ==
In April 2021, the local prosecutors declined charges against an officer after a video surfaced of him allegedly abusing his police dog the previous October. The officer subsequently was forced to resign.

In March 2021, a police officer was charged with insurance fraud.

In 2019, Salisbury police officers attempted to stop a 68-year old Black librarian for speeding ten miles over the limit. The librarian did not stop and led officers on a pursuit for 10 miles, resulting in the use of a tire deflation device. Once stopped, the officers then pulled her out the car after she refused to do so, by grabbing her hair. When she asked for medical attention, EMS was called and provided medical treatment. Body camera footage showed that police congratulated each other on their actions, with one saying "That’s good police work, baby" and another boasting of grabbing a "handful of dreads". The librarian stated she did not see the police cars that were attempting to pull her over or hear their sirens due to her listening to loud music; however, the librarian pled guilty to Failure to Heed to Blue Lights and Sirens

Two members of the department have died on duty, both in the early 20th century. In 1916, Special Officer Williamson Murray Linker was struck by a speeding car while directing traffic. In 1909, Policeman William A. Monroe was shot and killed when he intervened in a domestic disturbance.

== Organization ==
The department is headed by Jerry Stokes.

It is organized into a number of divisions:

- Administration Division
- Criminal Investigations Division
  - General Investigations,
  - Vice/Narcotic Unit,
  - Crime Lab and Evidence
- Operations Division
  - Patrol,
  - Parking Enforcement,
  - Youth Crime Prevention Officer,
  - Community Resource Officers,
  - School Resource Officer

== See also ==
- List of law enforcement agencies in North Carolina
- Rowan County Sheriff's Office
