= Pungo District Hospital =

- Vidant Health

Geography
- Location: Belhaven, North Carolina, United States
- Coordinates: 35.538053°N 76.623390°W

History
- Former name: Vidant Pungo Hospital
- Opened: 1949
- Closed: 2014

Links
- Website: vidanthealth.com/pungo
- Lists: Hospitals in North Carolina

Pungo District Hospital, known for a period as Vidant Pungo Hospital, was a hospital in Belhaven, North Carolina. It opened in 1949, was acquired by Vidant Health in 2011, and closed in 2014.

== History ==
The hospital opened in 1949. It was initially operated by the Pungo District Hospital Corporation.

The hospital had almost 57,000 square feet (5,300 m^{2}) of space.

=== Closure ===
The operator, asked for a third party to acquire the hospital as the operator could not pay for the care of the large number of Medicaid and Medicare patients using the hospital. In 2011 Vidant Health acquired the hospital, and PDHC was reformed into Pantego Creek LLC.

In September 2013, Vidant stated that it was unable to keep the hospital in operation due to poor finances and announced that it was going to close the hospital. Vidant cited that it would have had to spend additional funds on renovations to continue operation of the older hospital building and that it was operating the hospital at a loss. A group opposed to the closing a hospital had a January 2014 assessment commissioned by a hospital management company determined that in order to keep the hospital running would require for Vidant to give away for free all of the hospital assets to Pantego Creek, as well as a loan for $9,250,000 and an additional $3,000,000 in cash. While Vidant was willing to give the hospital itself to Pantego Creek, it did not agree to also give away the assets, and Pantego Creek did not have the ability to get the loan. In addition, Pantego Creek did not have the sufficient funds to keep the hospital running.

Pantego Creek took possession of the hospital on March 17, and in June of that year Vidant closed the hospital. The Pantego Creek Board agreed to the closure.

Mayor Adam O'Neal advocated for spending $500,000 to buy the hospital buildings, but Pantego Creek chose not to sell it. The hospital was demolished in 2016. Vidant paid for the demolition.

Vidant opened a non-emergency clinic in the area; it opened in 2015 and is in operation for 24 hours per day.

The NAACP criticized the hospital's closing. O'Neal also criticized the closing and held marches to Washington, DC, and he began facing political opposition due to his activism as there were residents who were afraid that his activism was too aggressive and would cause Vidant to cancel its proposed clinic in Belhaven. The Guardian reported that personal relationships in Belhaven became frayed as a result of the hospital closing controversy.
