= Durham Police Department (North Carolina) =

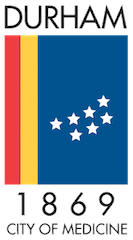
- Flag of Durham, North Carolina
- Abbreviation: DPD
- Motto: "To minimize crime, promote safety, and enhance the quality of life in partnership with our community."

Agency overview
- Employees: 672

Jurisdictional structure
- Operations jurisdiction: Durham, North Carolina, USA
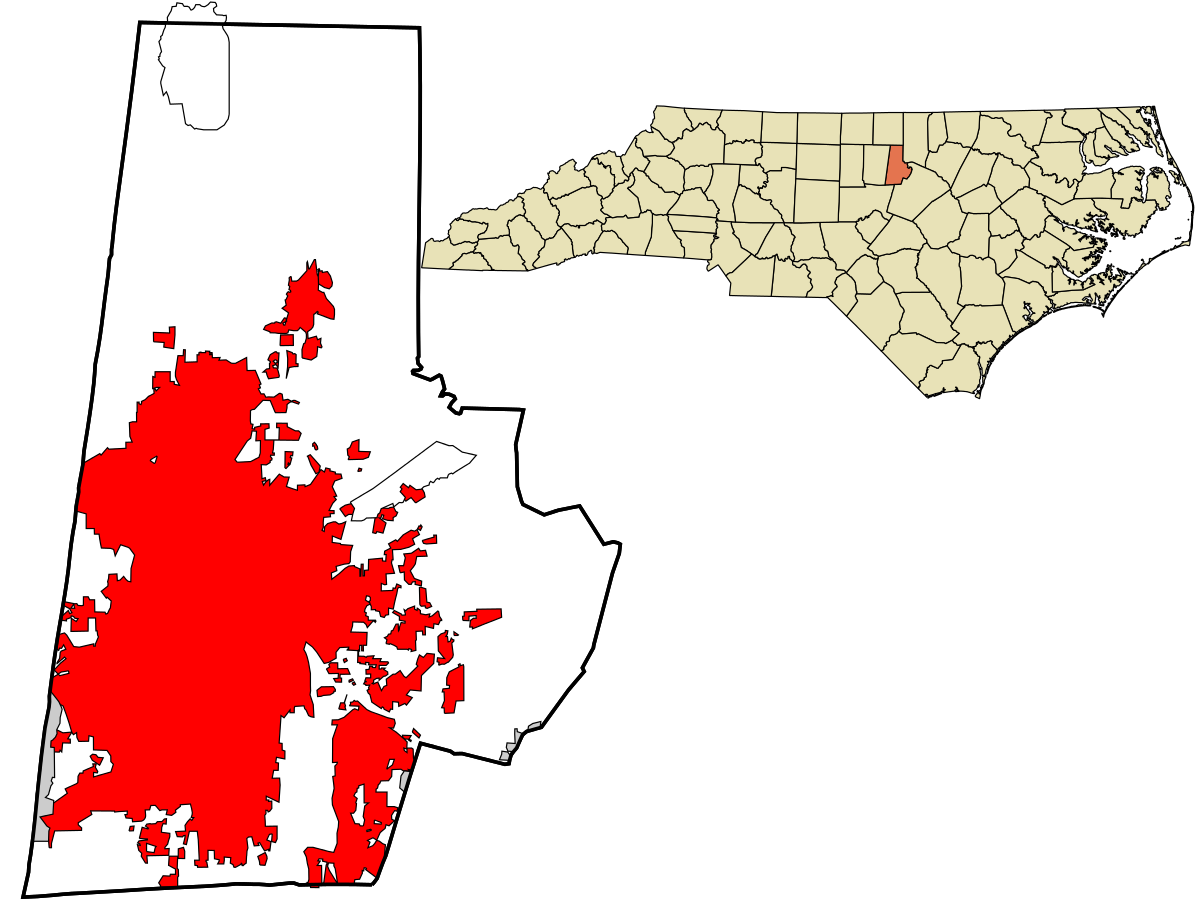
- Map of Durham Police Department's jurisdiction
- Area: 110.5 square miles (286 km^{2}) (July 2016)
- Population: 254,620 (July 2016)
- Legal jurisdiction: Durham, North Carolina, U.S.
- Governing body: Durham City Council
- General nature: Local civilian police

Operational structure
- Headquarters: 602 E Main St, Durham, North Carolina
- Officers: 548
- Civilians: 119
- Agency executives: Patrice Andrews, Chief of Police; Mark Clancy, Deputy Chief – Administrative Services; Jermaine Jackson, Deputy Chief – Patrol Operations; Walter Tate, Deputy Chief - Investigative Services; Thomas McMaster, Assistant Chief – Administrative Services; Raul Garcia, Assistant Chief – Patrol Operations

Facilities
- Substations: 5

Notables
- Award: CALEA Accredited

Website
- Durham Police website

The Durham Police Department is the municipal law enforcement agency of Durham, North Carolina.

== Overview ==
The Durham Police Department is a full service police department, having primary responsibilities for law enforcement and investigation within the city limits of Durham, North Carolina. The department was established in 1869 to provide policing services to the residents of Durham and has undergone many changes in its structure and operations since. The most notable change occurred in the 1970, when the City of Durham combined both the Durham Police Department and the Durham Fire Department to create a joint public safety agency. The agency was soon split again in 1985 to form separate police and fire services.

The Durham Police Department operates its own Police Academy through Durham Technical Community College. While the North Carolina Criminal Justice Education and Standards Commission requires a 16-week Basic Law Enforcement Training (BLET) course, the Durham Police Academy is 26 weeks.

The City of Durham convened a Civilian Police Review Board in 1999 to bolster police accountability. The board consists of nine citizen volunteers who are charged determining whether DPD's Professional Standards Division abused its discretion in conducting an internal affairs investigation into the following actions taken by officers: use of force, unethical conduct and/or conduct unbecoming, and arrest, search and seizure. Internal affairs investigators inform dissatisfied complainants of their right to appeal the case by submitting a written request to the Civilian Police Review Board.

== Organization ==
The Durham Police Department is organized into five bureaus:

- The Office of the Chief contains the Professional Standards Division, Public Affairs Unit, Staff Inspections, the Police Attorney, and support staff.
- Administrative Service Bureau provides many necessary functions to support and serve both police officers as well as citizens. It contains the Information Technology Division, the Training Division and Recruiting Unit, the Fiscal Services Division, the Employee Services Division, and the Planning & Research Division.
- Field Operations consists of the Patrol Services Bureau and the Support Services Bureau. The Patrol Services Bureau includes four of the five police districts (districts 1-4), each of which consist of four patrol squads and a district investigation unit. District 5 (downtown area) uniform patrol and district investigations are among the Canine Unit, Traffic Accident and Collision Team (TACT), and the Motor Unit in the Special Services Division under the Support Services Bureau. The Community Services Division, the Special Projects/Logistics Division, and the Analytical Services Division are also under the Support Services Bureau.
- Investigative Services Bureau consists of the Organized Crime Unit, the Criminal Investigations Unit, and the Forensic Services Division. This Criminal Investigations Unit differs from the district investigation units in that there are five specialized investigative teams: the Homicide Unit, the Domestic Violence Unit, the Special Victims Unit, the Financial Crimes Unit, and the Robbery Unit.

== District information ==
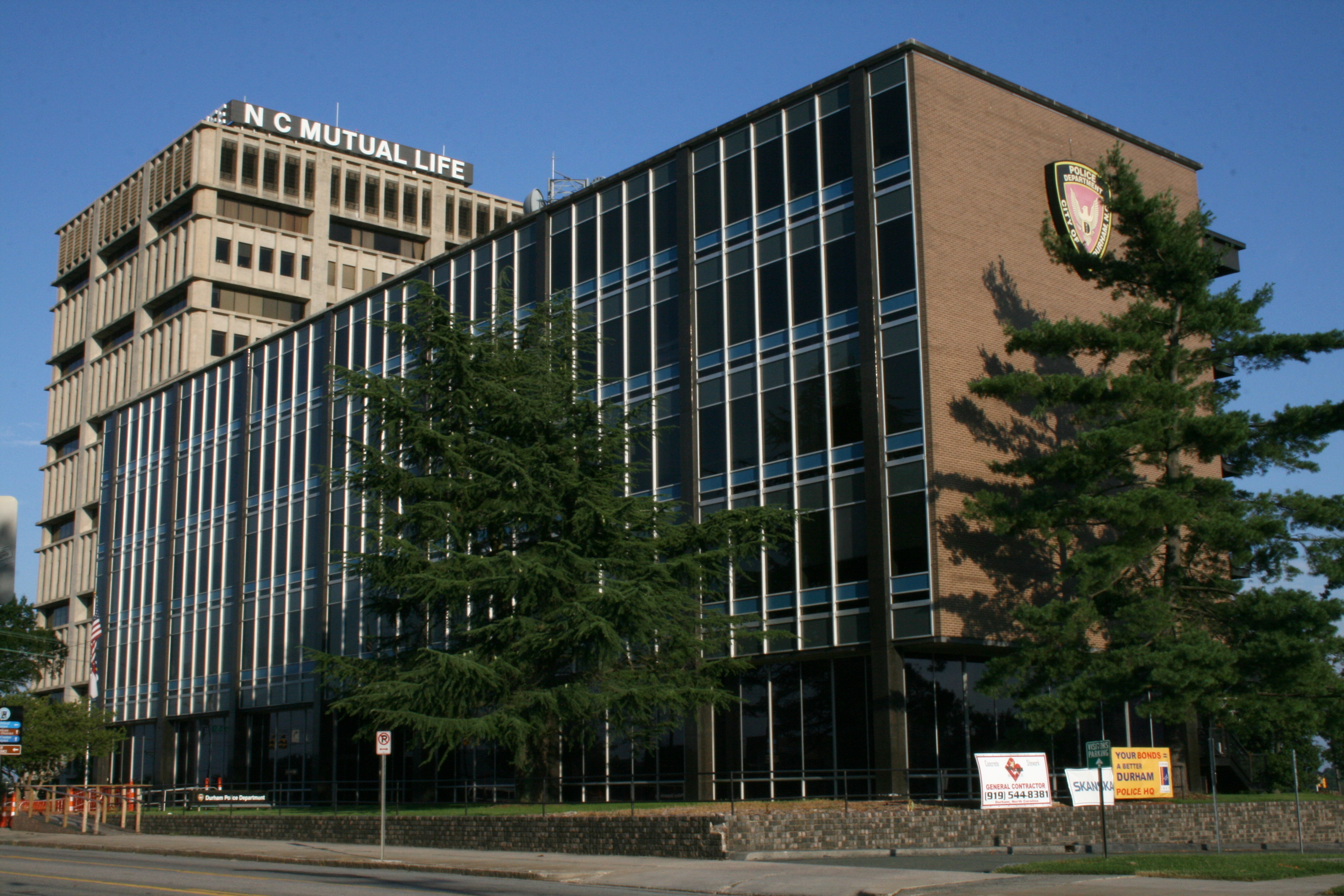
Former Durham Police Department Headquarters

The Durham Police Department's headquarters is currently located at 602 East Main St. Completed in October 2018, the $71,468,126 four-story complex sits on 4.5 acres and features enclosed parking deck for staff and a surface lot for visitor parking. Police headquarters houses the fully digital Durham Emergency Communication Center (DECC) on the fourth floor. All police services operate out of headquarters with the exception of the Community Service Bureau, the Property and Evidence Unit, Uniform Patrol and District Investigations for Districts 1-4, which are housed at satellite locations called substations.

District Name	Station Location	Area of Focus	Units
District 1	921 Holloway Street	East	Criminal Investigations, Uniform Patrol, Community Services & Crime Prevention Unit, Victim Services Unit, Property & Evidence Unit
District 2	5285 N Roxboro Street	North	Criminal Investigations, Uniform Patrol
District 3	8 Consultant Place	Southwest	Criminal Investigations, Uniform Patrol
District 4	2945 S Miami Blvd, Suite 135	Southeast	Criminal Investigations, Uniform Patrol
District 5	602 E Main St	Downtown/Special Services	Criminal Investigations, Uniform Patrol, Bicycle Squad, K9, Traffic Services (TACT & Motors)

== Vehicles ==
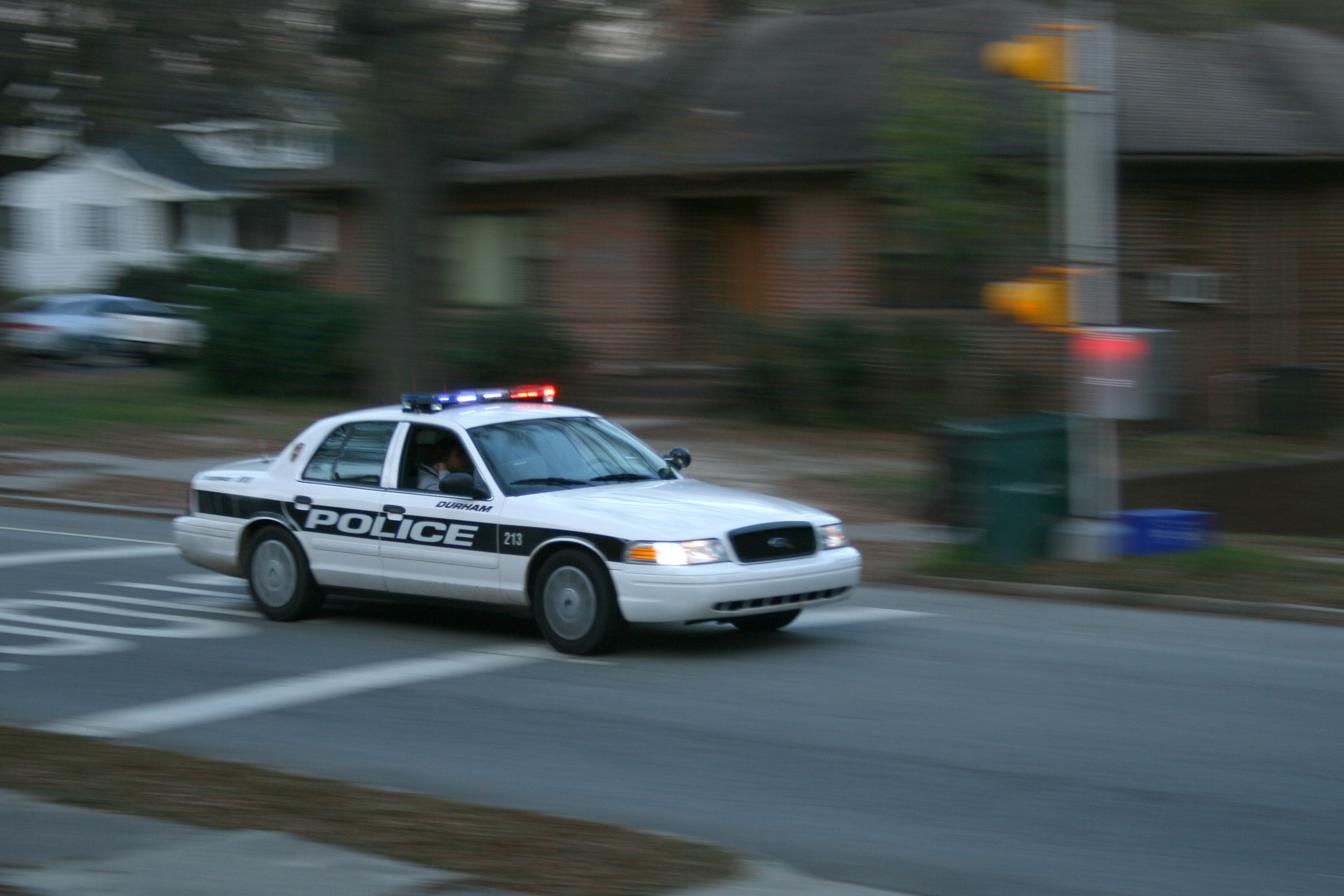
Durham Police Crown Victoria

The Durham Police Department utilizes many different types of vehicles to accomplish its mission. The primary marked patrol vehicle of the Durham Police Department is the Dodge Charger. Uniform patrol sergeants and K9 units are equipped with a Chevrolet Tahoe. While the Ford Crown Victoria has almost been completely phased out of the fleet, a number remain as spare line cars. Similarly, the Department still employs many Chevrolet Impalas for assignments not requiring marked vehicles as it continues the transition to a Dodge Charger and Ford Explorer Interceptor unmarked fleet. Downtown units use Trek bicycles and Polaris EFI 500 UTVs for patrolling nearby trails and special events downtown. The motor unit utilizes Harley-Davidson Electra Glide motorcycles.

The marked units are equipped with Panasonic Mobile Computer Terminals (MCTs) with internet connectivity, LoJack receivers, Coban Digital Video Recording, Motorola 800 MHz radios, and GPS. The marked vehicles are also equipped with both red and blue overhead emergency lights. Having red lights is not common among many law enforcement agencies in North Carolina, but the red signifies the department's previous history as a public safety agency.

As of 2017, the department issues a marked take-home patrol car vehicle to all Uniform Patrol Officers who live in the city limits.

== Equipment ==
The Durham Police Department issues each officer standard equipment. Certain additional equipment or accessories may also be carried, but are not issued by the department.

- Safariland high-gloss Sam Browne belt and duty gear
- Peerless handcuffs, hinged
- Saber defensive spray (OC/CS)
- ASP Friction-Loc 21" steel expandable baton
- Maglite rechargeable flashlight (3-Cell D size)
- Motorola APX 6000 radio
- Glock 17 9mm
- Taser X2 Electronic Control Device
- Remington 870 Police Magnum (optional for carry)
- Vievu LE5 body-worn camera

The Durham Police Department's Selective Enforcement Team (SET) utilizes special weapons including M4 carbines, Heckler and Koch MP5s, various non-lethal chemical agents as well as special armor and protective equipment.

== Patches and uniforms ==
The Durham Police Department's Uniform Patrol wears navy blue uniform shirts and matching pants. The shirts have police patches on both shoulders. Officers utilize a gloss leather Sam Browne belt to carry equipment.

The current patch has been in service since 1985. It has a navy blue background with a red center and gold trim. The navy blue represents law enforcement while the red represents the department's history as a public safety agency. The center displays an eagle holding an olive branch and arrows which is reminiscent of the Great Seal of the United States. The center of the eagle has a gold shield and blue "D"-shape with the Rod of Asclepius over the top representing one of Durham's nicknames, "The City of Medicine".

Older patches include a round patch with tobacco leaves representing Durham's history as a major producer of tobacco products. The Public Safety era patch was used from around 1970 to 1985 while the Durham Police and Fire Departments merged.

== Rank structure ==
Title	Insignia	Positions
Chief of Police		Chief of Police is Department Head
Deputy Chief		Deputy Chief works in an Administrative area
Assistant Chief		Assistant Chiefs are in charge of a Bureau
Captain		Captains are in charge of a Division or District
Lieutenant		Lieutenants are Watch Commanders
Sergeant		Sergeants are in charge of a Unit
Corporal		
Senior Patrol Officer/ Investigator		
Police Officer II		
Police Recruit

== Fallen officers ==
Officer Name	End of Watch	Incident Type
Sergeant Gill P. Cates	5/28/1913	Gunfire
Detective Roland A. Gill	6/10/1933	Gunfire
Patrolman J. Clarence Price	12/3/1939	Motorcycle Accident
Patrolman Shirley Ladd	1/1/1943	Motorcycle Accident
Investigator Larry Douglas Bullock	4/29/1976	Gunfire
Officer Gary E. Fletcher	2/16/1978	Accidental
Corporal Billy Thomas Gregory	4/24/2004	Heart Attack
Officer Charles J. Callemyn	2/17/2007	Automobile Crash

== See also ==
- List of law enforcement agencies in North Carolina
