= Randolph Chitwood =

American cardiothoracic surgeon

Walter Randolph "Ranny" Chitwood Jr. is known for his work as a cardiothoracic surgeon at the Brody School of Medicine at East Carolina University located in Greenville, North Carolina.

Chitwood is recognized as the first heart surgeon to perform robot-assisted heart valve surgery in the US.

== Biography ==
Chitwood is a native of Wytheville, Virginia. He graduated from Hampden–Sydney College and received his medical degree from the University of Virginia in 1974. He obtained all of his surgical training at Duke University Medical Center under Dr. David C. Sabiston, where he spent 10 years training in general and cardiothoracic surgery, as well as basic science research.

He was the first house staff member at Duke to be selected to Alpha Omega Alpha. After his chief residency at Duke in 1984, he was selected to develop and head the new cardiac surgery program at the East Carolina University School of Medicine. His initial appointment was as a full professor of surgery. Except for a two-year hiatus as the chief of cardiothoracic surgery at the University of Kentucky, he has spent his entire career at ECU, where he was chairman of the Department of Surgery from 1995 to 2003. He also served as senior associate vice chancellor of the Health Sciences Division for Cardiovascular Diseases and paved the way for the development of a new specialty hospital and research institute - the East Carolina Heart Institute. As of 2009, East Carolina Heart Institute was reported to have performed over 1,200 cardiac surgical, 3,000 interventional, and 5,000 diagnostic catheter-based procedures yearly. The center's research laboratories have been responsible for training residents and supporting established investigators alike. Chitwood's research activities relate to myocardial preservation and angiogenesis, as well as endoscopic and robotic tele-manipulation in cardiac surgery. He has been the principal investigator of the FDA robotic mitral valve trials that led to approval for this use in the United States.

He is a member of 25 professional societies which include the American College of Surgeons, the Royal College of Surgeons of England, the American Association for Thoracic Surgery, the Society of Thoracic Surgeons, the Southern Thoracic Surgical Association, the Society of University Surgeons, the American Surgical Association, the American College of Cardiology, and the Cardiac Surgery Biology Club. He is on numerous committees in these societies. He has been President of the International Society of Minimally Invasive Cardiac Surgery, The Society for Heart Valve Disease, and the North Carolina Chapter of the American Heart Association. He serves the editorial boards of the Annals of Thoracic Surgery, the Journal of Cardiac Surgery, the Journal of Heart Valve Disease, the Asian Annals of Cardiovascular and Thoracic Surgery, CTS Net, the Heart Surgery Forum, Chest, and the American Heart Journal. He has authored over 150 peer reviewed scientific and clinical articles, as well as many book chapters and several monographs. He has special expertise in complex valvular surgery, including mitral repair and endoscopic mitral valve surgery. He has written widely and lectured internationally on innovative techniques in minimally invasive and robotic cardiac surgery. In 2003 he was elected to Fellowship in the prestigious Royal College of Surgeons of England. His lifelong avocations have been photography, amateur radio, and antiquarian medical bibliophilia.
