= ECU Health Roanoke-Chowan Hospital =

Coordinates: 36.2851667°N 76.9949073°W

Roanoke-Chowan Hospital
- ECU Health

Geography
- Location: Ahoskie, North Carolina, US

Organisation
- Affiliated university: Brody School of Medicine at East Carolina University

Services
- Beds: 148

History
- Founded: 1948

Roanoke-Chowan Hospital is a hospital located in Ahoskie, North Carolina. It is a part of the ECU Health System.

In the 1930s, James David Early of nearby Early's Station community was a major supporter of building a hospital in Ahoskie and committed land for the project. After his death, his son, James Bertram Early, Sr., completed the transaction donating the land. In 1948, the hospital was the first to use the Hill-Burton Act for construction.

ECU Health took over management in 1997. The hospital has 86 general and 28 psychiatric hospital beds. It also has five Shared Inpatient/Ambulatory Surgery, one C-Section, and one Endoscopy operating rooms.
