= Raleigh Police Department =

- Patch of the Raleigh Police Department

- Badge of the Raleigh Police Department
- Abbreviation: RPD

Agency overview
- Employees: 906
- Annual budget: $138 million (2025)

Jurisdictional structure
- Operations jurisdiction: Raleigh, North Carolina, USA
- Map of Raleigh City Limits
- Area: 149.6 square miles
- Population: 506,306 (2025)
- General nature: Local civilian police

Operational structure
- Headquarters: Raleigh, North Carolina
- Officers: 802
- Civilians: 104
- Agency executive: Rico Boyce, Chief of Police
- Divisions: 5

Facilities
- Districts: 6

Notables
- Award: CALEA Accredited

Website
- Raleigh Police website

The Raleigh Police Department is the municipal law enforcement agency for the city of Raleigh, North Carolina.

== Overview ==
The Raleigh Police Department is a full service police department, serving all areas in the city limits of Raleigh, and some properties which are owned by the City and situated outside the city limits (such as Lake Wheeler Park). Though RPD has jurisdiction at all locations inside the city limits and all properties owned by the City, other agencies sometimes take on first responder responsibilities at certain locations. For example, NC State University Campus Police respond initially to any emergency police calls on the campus of North Carolina State University, even though the main campus is located in the Raleigh city limits. Some law enforcement support tasks are outsourced to other agencies in the county. Crime scene processing is handled by City/County Bureau of Identification, and the county jail is operated by the Wake County Sheriff's Office.

== Organization ==
The Raleigh Police Department is organized into five offices, with five divisions:

1. The Office of Field Operations is the primary law enforcement branch of the Raleigh Police Department. It is commanded by a Deputy Chief.
  - The Division of Field Operations oversees the six patrol districts. Officers assigned to patrol districts will carry out standard police functions such as traffic control, responding to 911 calls, and assisting the public. The division is commanded by a Major.
2. The Office of Support Operations houses the detective and special operations division. It is commanded by a Deputy Chief.
  - The Detective Division is the investigative arm of the Raleigh Police Department. It houses units such as the Vice Unit, Homicide Unit, Intelligence Unit, and Gang Suppression Unit. The division is commanded by a Major.
  - The Special Operations Division serves to provide additional resources to the field operations division. It houses units such as Selective Enforcement, Traffic, K-9, and Mounted. The division is commanded by a Major.
3. The Office of Community Engagement is responsible for providing transparency and community relations. It is commanded by the Assistant Director for Community Engagement.
  - The Division of Community Engagement is tasked with increasing trust and transparency between the police and community. Its units include the Community Liaison Unit, Community Outreach Unit, and Youth and Family Outreach Unit. It is commanded by a Major.
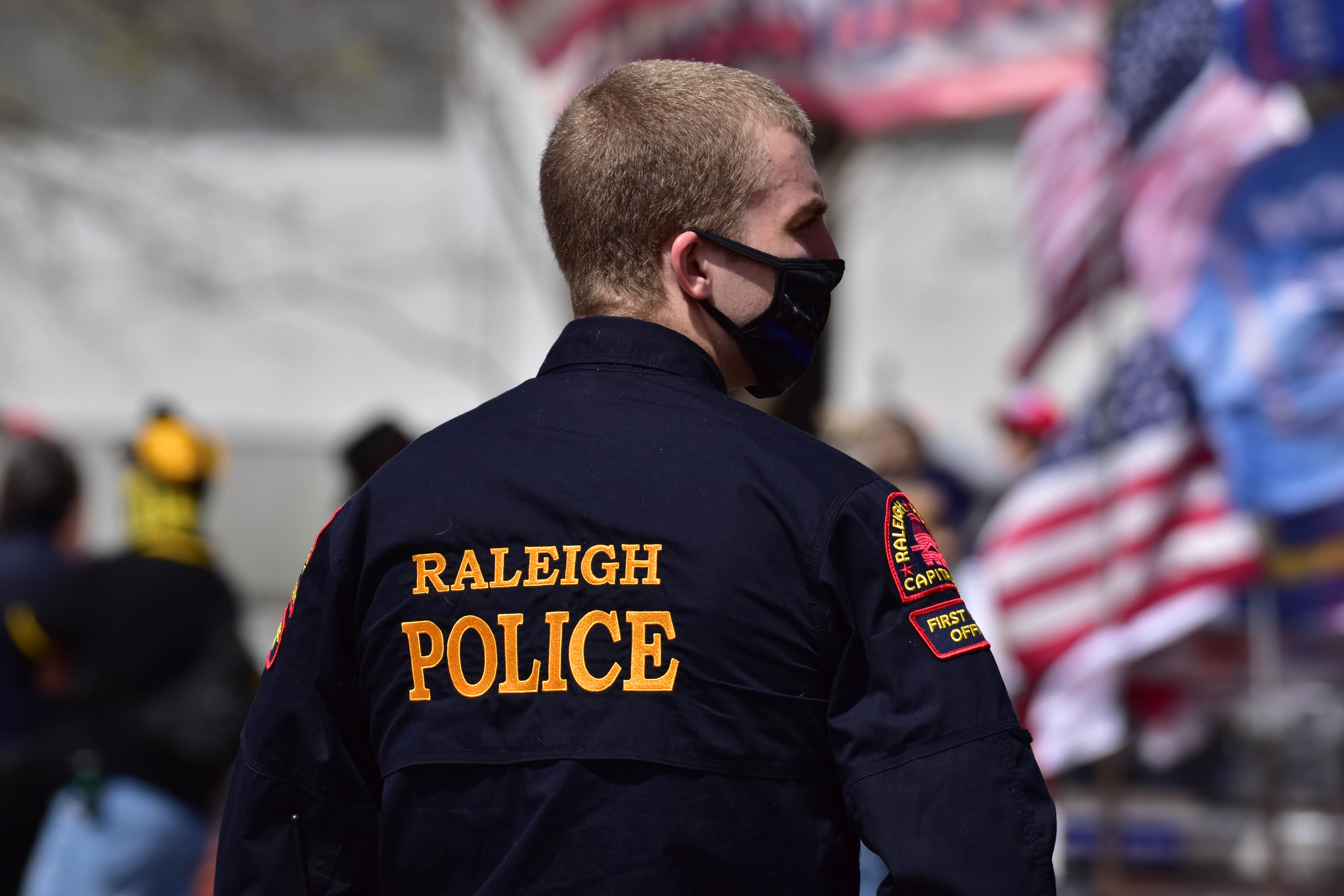
4. RPD Officer observing a protest in Downtown Raleigh
  The Office of Administrative Operations is in charge of the administrative and internal operations of the department. It is commanded by a Deputy Chief.
  - The Administrative Services Division provides personnel with a large amount of services to support headquarters, the police districts, and civilians. It houses units such as Training, Recruitment, Evidence, and Records. It is commanded by a Major.
5. The Office of the Chief is dedicated to providing support functions and services to the chief, as well as headquarters. It does not have any divisions, but it does house units such as Professional Standards, Finance, and Public Affairs. The Office of the Chief is overseen by the Chief of Police, but is commanded by a Major.

== District Information ==
District Name	Station Location	District Size	District Commander	Contact Number
Northwest	8016 Glenwood Avenue	33 sq mi	Captain Joseph Mercer	(919) 996 - 2300
North	6716 Six Forks Road	28 sq mi	Captain Jason Yardley	(919) 996 - 3335
Northeast	5230 Greens Dairy Rd	26 sq mi	Captain Peter Morrison	(919) 996 - 2457
Southeast	2800 Rock Quarry Road	27 sq mi	Captain Diana Painter	(919) 996 - 4455
Downtown (Headquarters)	111 W Hargett St	5 sq mi	Captain William Nordstrom	(919) 996 - 3855
Southwest	601 Hutton Street	21 sq mi	Captain Alexander Johnson	(919) 996 - 6167

== Rank structure ==
Title	Insignia	Description
Chief of Police		The Chief of Police oversees the department and reports to the City Manager.
Deputy Chief		Deputy Chiefs are second in command to the Chief of Police. Each oversees an office within the department.
Major		Each division is commanded by a Major, who oversees its daily operations, personnel, and resources.
Captain		In the Field Operations Division, each district is commanded by a Captain. Captains are also assigned to other divisions within the department.
Lieutenant		Lieutenants serve as deputy commanders of each district and are also assigned to other divisions within the department.
Sergeant		Sergeants supervise teams of officers and oversee specialized units. Each district generally has eight sergeants assigned to Field Operations.
Detective		An officer may apply to be promoted to Detective. Detectives are responsible for investigating crimes within their respective investigative unit or assisting patrol officers.
Senior Officer		Officers with six years of service with the Raleigh Police Department are eligible to advance to Senior Officer. This is not considered a promotion.
Master Officer		Officers with four years of service with the Raleigh Police Department or another police agency are eligible to advance to Master Officer. This is not considered a promotion.
First Class Officer		Officers with two years of service with the Raleigh Police Department or another police agency are eligible to advance to First Class Officer. This is not considered a promotion.
Officer		The Officer title is given to new officers upon being sworn in. It is also used to refer to First Class, Master, and Senior Officers.
Recruit		A Recruit is a new officer going through the Raleigh Police Academy.

Officers who advance to Officer First Class, Master Officer, or Senior Officer wear tab patches on each arm beneath the standard shoulder patch, similar to how Sergeant chevrons are worn. The patches identify the officer’s rank.

== Vehicles ==
The Raleigh Police Department uses distinct blue-and-white markings on its marked vehicles, while unmarked vehicles are also used. Standard patrol vehicles include Ford Explorer Police Interceptor Utilities, while Special Operations units commonly use Chevrolet Tahoes. The department also utilizes motorcycles, bicycles, ATVs, Segways, and horses for various operations. Most marked vehicles are equipped with modern police technology, including mobile computers, radios, GPS, and digital video recording systems.

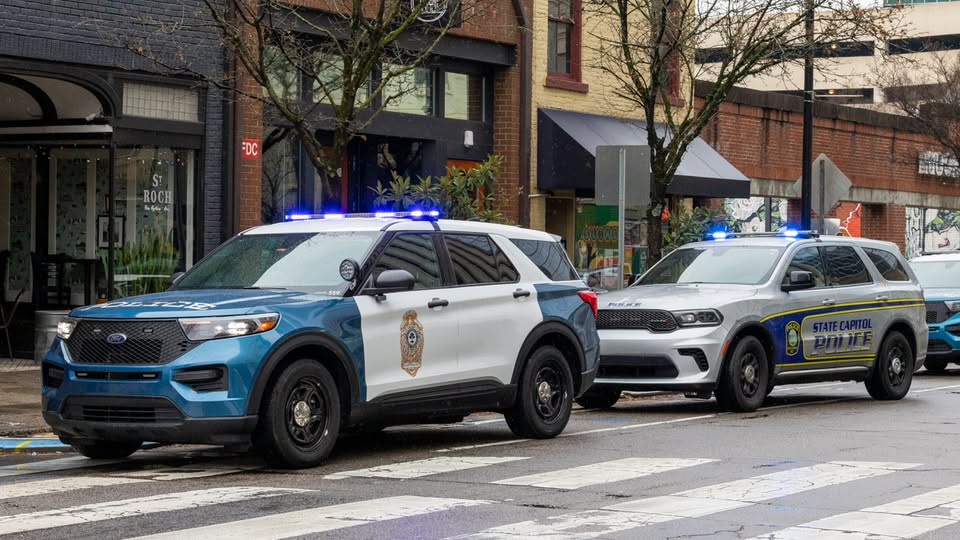
Raleigh Police unit (front) and NC State Capitol Police unit (back) parked downtown in Raleigh.

== Equipment ==
Patrol Officers are issued a standard duty belt equipped with essential equipment used during their daily duties. Standard equipment includes:

- Smith & Wesson or Peerless handcuffs, available in either chain or hinged configurations
- Sabre Red Oleoresin Capsicum (OC) spray, rated at 2,000,000 SHU
- ASP Friction-Loc 21-inch expandable steel baton
- Streamlight Strion rechargeable LED flashlight
- Motorola APX Series radio
- SIG Sauer P320 X-Series 9mm pistol, which replaced the Smith & Wesson M&P chambered in .45 ACP
- Taser X2 Electronic Control Device
- Patrol rifle or shotgun, when authorized and needed for specific situations

Patrol Officers may be equipped with a Smith & Wesson M&P15 or other AR-15-pattern rifle chambered in .223/5.56, equipped with a SureFire M500A weapon light. Officers may also use a Remington 870 Police Magnum 12-gauge shotgun equipped with a SureFire light.

=== Selective Enforcement Unit ===
The Raleigh Police Department maintains three full-time Selective Enforcement Unit (SEU) teams, which serve as the department's specialized tactical unit. Officers assigned to SEU are equipped with a variety of specialized equipment and weapons appropriate for tactical operations, including the M4 Carbine, Heckler & Koch MP5, and UMP-45.

Other specialized units within the department may use additional equipment and weapons based on the specific duties and operational needs of their assignments.

== See also ==
- List of law enforcement agencies in North Carolina
