= ECU Health Duplin Hospital =

- ECU Health

Geography
- Location: Kenansville, Duplin County, North Carolina, United States
- Coordinates: 34.964405°N 77.9618136°W

Organization
- Type: General
- Affiliated university: Brody School of Medicine at East Carolina University

Services
- Emergency department: Yes
- Beds: 101

History
- Founded: 1955

Links
- Website: http://www.uhseast.com/duplin/
- Lists: Hospitals in North Carolina

ECU Health Duplin Hospital is a hospital located in Kenansville, North Carolina. It is affiliated with the ECU Health Medical Center & ECU Health in Greenville, NC.

== History ==
The hospital opened in 1955 and added a nine-bed intensive care unit in the 1970s. The hospital added 55,000 square feet (5,100 m^{2}) in 1989.

== Services ==
Duplin General Hospital has 61 general and 20 psychiatric hospital beds. It has 20 general nursing home beds and three Shared Inpatient/Ambulatory Surgery operating rooms.
