= Belhaven, North Carolina =

- Town
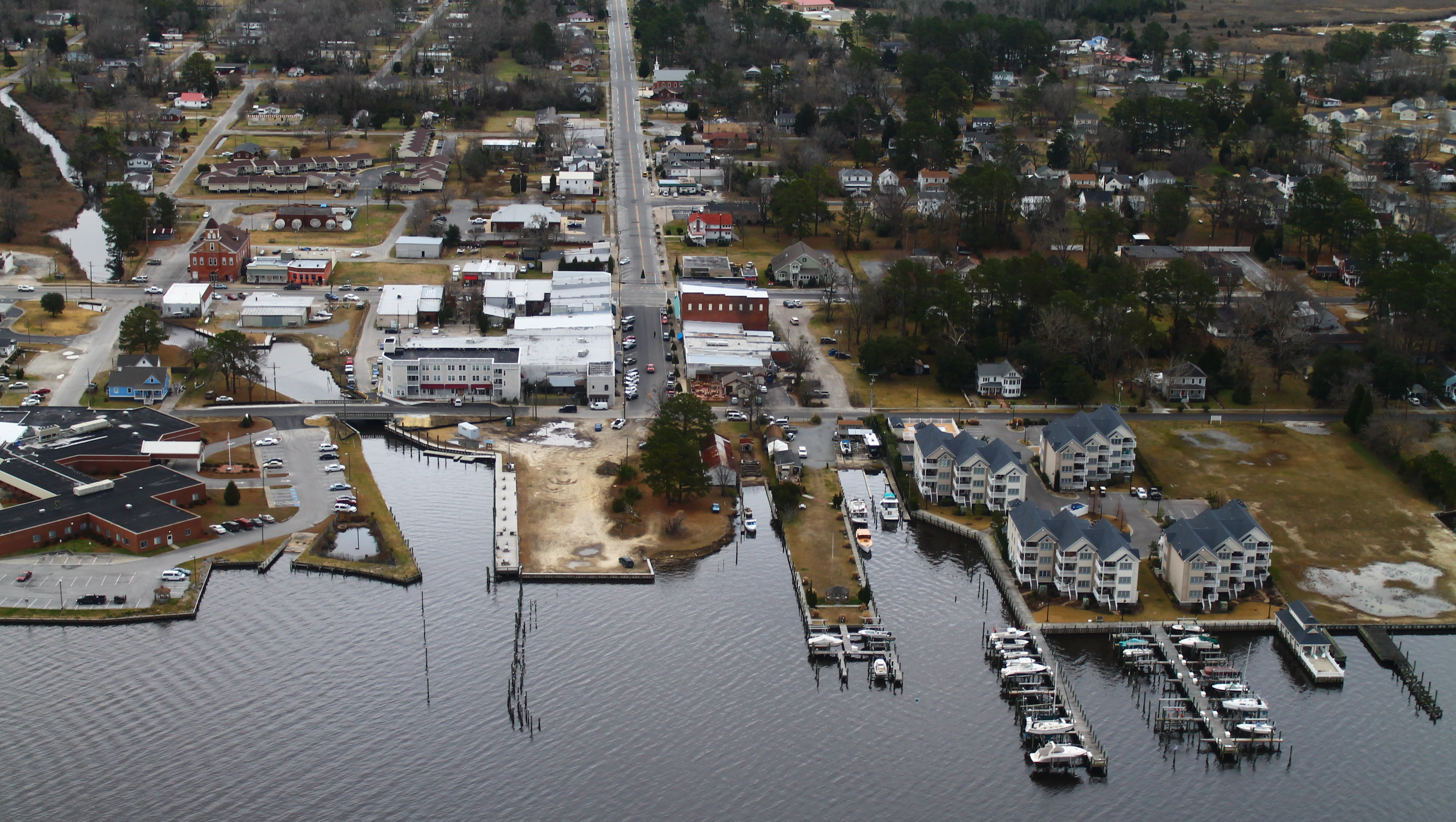
- Downtown Belhaven

- Seal Logo
- Nicknames: Birthplace of the Atlantic Intracoastal Waterway, The Beautiful Safe Harbor
- Motto: "Seafood, Watersports and Abundant Wildlife"
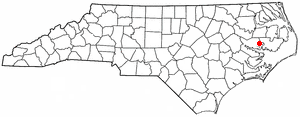
- Location of Belhaven, North Carolina
- Coordinates: 35°32′33″N 76°37′22″W
- Country: United States
- State: North Carolina
- County: Beaufort

Government
  - mayor: Rick Credle

Area
  - Total: 2.09 sq mi (5.41 km^{2})
  - Land: 1.59 sq mi (4.12 km^{2})
  - Water: 0.50 sq mi (1.29 km^{2})
- Elevation: 3 ft (0.91 m)

Population (2020)
  - Total: 1,410
  - Density: 886.5/sq mi (342.29/km^{2})
- Time zone: UTC-5 (Eastern (EST))
  - Summer (DST): UTC-4 (EDT)
- ZIP code: 27810
- Area code: 252
- FIPS code: 37-04640
- GNIS feature ID: 2405229
- Website: townofbelhaven.com

Belhaven is a waterfront town in Beaufort County, North Carolina, United States. The population was 1,410 at the 2020 census. Belhaven is located in North Carolina's Inner Banks region.

== History ==
The Belhaven City Hall was listed on the National Register of Historic Places in 1981.

== Healthcare ==
The community formerly had a hospital, Pungo District Hospital, which opened in 1949. Pantego Creek LLC, the operator, asked for a third party to acquire the hospital as the operator could not pay for the care of the large number of Medicaid and Medicare patients using the hospital. In 2011 Vidant Health acquired the hospital; in 2013 Vidant stated that it was unable to keep the hospital in operation due to poor finances and announced that it was going to close the hospital. Pantego Creek Board closed it in 2014, and it was demolished in 2016. Vidant opened a non-emergency clinic in the area.

== Geography ==
Belhaven is located on the north shore of the Pungo River.

According to the United States Census Bureau, the town has a total area of 2.1 square miles (5.4 km^{2}), of which 1.6 square miles (4.1 km^{2}) is land and 0.50 square miles (1.3 km^{2}), or 23.88%, is water.

== Climate ==
Climate data for Belhaven, North Carolina, 1991–2020 normals, extremes 1908–2022
Month	Jan	Feb	Mar	Apr	May	Jun	Jul	Aug	Sep	Oct	Nov	Dec	Year
Record high °F (°C)	82 (28)	86 (30)	98 (37)	94 (34)	105 (41)	102 (39)	105 (41)	106 (41)	108 (42)	96 (36)	85 (29)	82 (28)	108 (42)
Mean maximum °F (°C)	71.7 (22.1)	74.2 (23.4)	80.2 (26.8)	86.8 (30.4)	91.1 (32.8)	95.2 (35.1)	96.0 (35.6)	95.1 (35.1)	90.7 (32.6)	85.4 (29.7)	79.9 (26.6)	73.9 (23.3)	97.6 (36.4)
Mean daily maximum °F (°C)	53.9 (12.2)	57.2 (14.0)	63.3 (17.4)	72.8 (22.7)	79.2 (26.2)	85.6 (29.8)	88.6 (31.4)	87.2 (30.7)	82.5 (28.1)	74.6 (23.7)	64.9 (18.3)	56.9 (13.8)	72.2 (22.3)
Daily mean °F (°C)	43.2 (6.2)	45.7 (7.6)	51.7 (10.9)	61.1 (16.2)	68.6 (20.3)	76.1 (24.5)	79.7 (26.5)	77.9 (25.5)	72.8 (22.7)	63.1 (17.3)	53.3 (11.8)	46.5 (8.1)	61.6 (16.4)
Mean daily minimum °F (°C)	32.6 (0.3)	34.3 (1.3)	40.0 (4.4)	49.3 (9.6)	58.0 (14.4)	66.6 (19.2)	70.7 (21.5)	68.6 (20.3)	63.2 (17.3)	51.6 (10.9)	41.7 (5.4)	36.2 (2.3)	51.1 (10.6)
Mean minimum °F (°C)	15.9 (−8.9)	21.2 (−6.0)	25.8 (−3.4)	34.0 (1.1)	44.8 (7.1)	54.9 (12.7)	61.7 (16.5)	59.4 (15.2)	49.9 (9.9)	38.1 (3.4)	28.9 (−1.7)	20.8 (−6.2)	13.6 (−10.2)
Record low °F (°C)	−10 (−23)	0 (−18)	10 (−12)	25 (−4)	35 (2)	43 (6)	52 (11)	46 (8)	41 (5)	26 (−3)	19 (−7)	2 (−17)	−10 (−23)
Average precipitation inches (mm)	3.85 (98)	3.00 (76)	3.71 (94)	3.30 (84)	4.01 (102)	6.07 (154)	6.09 (155)	6.35 (161)	5.35 (136)	3.58 (91)	3.33 (85)	3.63 (92)	52.27 (1,328)
Average snowfall inches (cm)	0.5 (1.3)	0.3 (0.76)	0.0 (0.0)	0.0 (0.0)	0.0 (0.0)	0.0 (0.0)	0.0 (0.0)	0.0 (0.0)	0.0 (0.0)	0.0 (0.0)	0.0 (0.0)	0.4 (1.0)	1.2 (3.0)
Average precipitation days (≥ 0.01 in)	10.1	7.8	9.6	7.3	8.8	9.0	10.4	10.4	8.7	5.9	6.9	8.4	103.3
Average snowy days (≥ 0.1 in)	0.3	0.2	0.0	0.0	0.0	0.0	0.0	0.0	0.0	0.0	0.0	0.2	0.7
Source 1: NOAA
Source 2: National Weather Service (mean maxima/minima 1981–2010)

== Demographics ==
Historical population
Census	Pop.	Note	%±
1900	383		—
1910	2,863		647.5%
1920	1,816		−36.6%
1930	2,458		35.4%
1940	2,360		−4.0%
1950	2,528		7.1%
1960	2,386		−5.6%
1970	2,259		−5.3%
1980	2,430		7.6%
1990	2,269		−6.6%
2000	1,968		−13.3%
2010	1,688		−14.2%
2020	1,410		−16.5%
U.S. Decennial Census

=== 2020 census ===
Belhaven town, North Carolina – Racial and ethnic composition Note: the US Census treats Hispanic/Latino as an ethnic category. This table excludes Latinos from the racial categories and assigns them to a separate category. Hispanics/Latinos may be of any race.
Race / Ethnicity (NH = Non-Hispanic)	Pop 2000	Pop 2010	Pop 2020	% 2000	% 2010	% 2020
White alone (NH)	699	635	580	35.52%	37.62%	41.13%
Black or African American alone (NH)	1,192	930	669	60.57%	55.09%	47.45%
Native American or Alaska Native alone (NH)	3	8	2	0.15%	0.47%	0.14%
Asian alone (NH)	9	8	8	0.46%	0.47%	0.57%
Native Hawaiian or Pacific Islander alone (NH)	0	0	0	0.00%	0.00%	0.00%
Other Race alone (NH)	0	0	0	0.00%	0.00%	0.07%
Mixed race or Multiracial (NH)	12	22	34	0.61%	1.30%	2.41%
Hispanic or Latino (any race)	53	85	116	2.69%	5.04%	8.23%
Total	1,968	1,688	1,410	100.00%	100.00%	100.00%

As of the 2020 United States census, there were 1,410 people, 756 households, and 377 families residing in the town.

=== 2000 census ===
As of the census of 2000, there were 1,968 people, 827 households, and 530 families residing in the town. The population density was 1,313.4 inhabitants per square mile (507.1/km^{2}). There were 1,015 housing units at an average density of 677.4 per square mile (261.5/km^{2}). The racial makeup of the town was 37.30% White, 60.67% African American, 0.15% Native American, 0.46% Asian, 0.71% from other races, and 0.71% from two or more races. Hispanic or Latino of any race were 2.69% of the population.

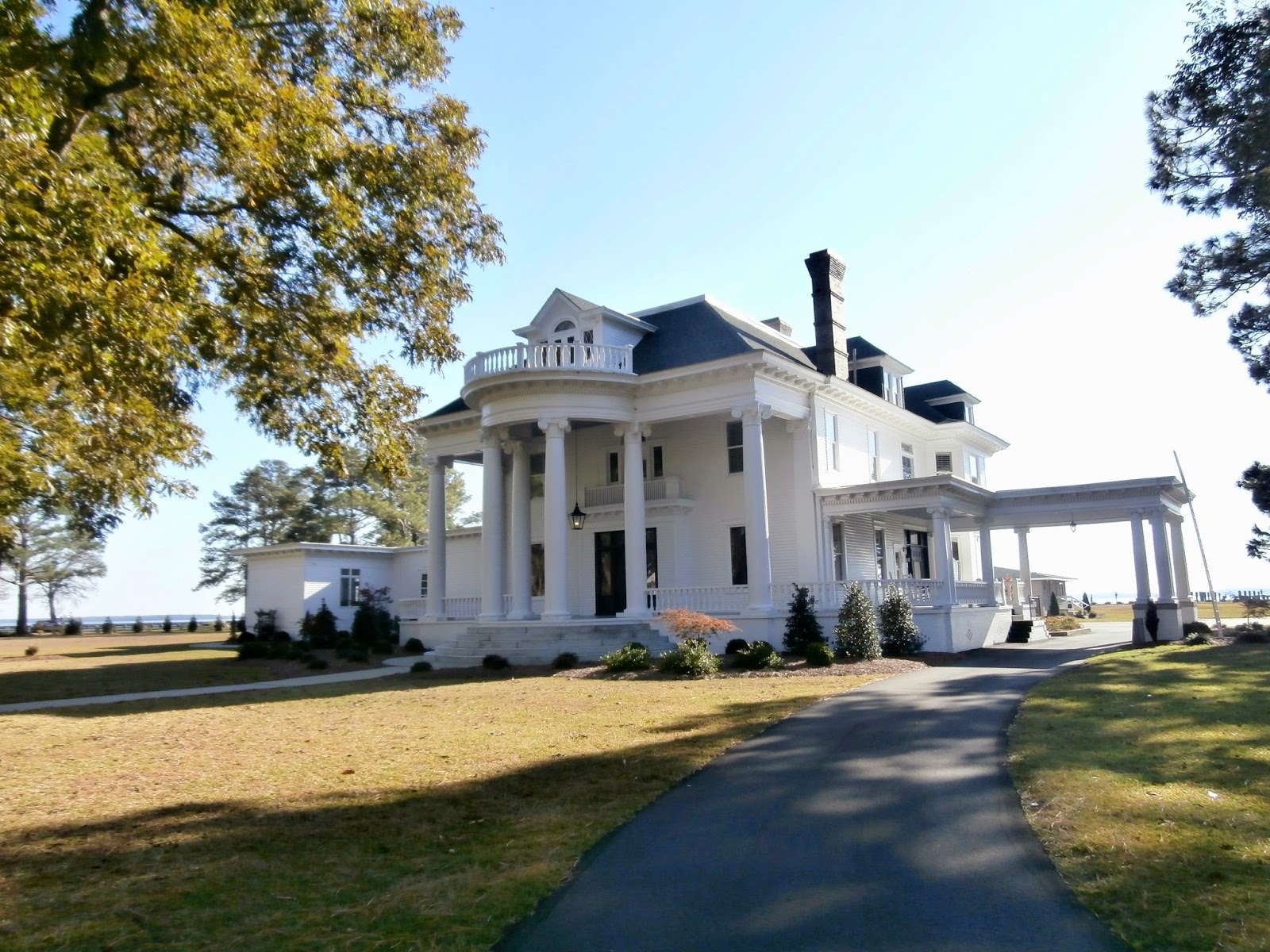
River Forest Manor (built 1904)

There were 827 households, out of which 28.2% had children under the age of 18 living with them, 38.6% were married couples living together, 22.0% had a female householder with no husband present, and 35.9% were non-families. 32.6% of all households were made up of individuals, and 16.6% had someone living alone who was 65 years of age or older. The average household size was 2.36 and the average family size was 2.99.

In the town, the population was spread out, with 24.7% under the age of 18, 7.1% from 18 to 24, 25.6% from 25 to 44, 23.6% from 45 to 64, and 19.1% who were 65 years of age or older. The median age was 41 years. For every 100 females, there were 81.9 males. For every 100 females age 18 and over, there were 75.2 males.

The median income for a household in the town was $16,674, and the median income for a family was $23,958. Males had a median income of $23,839 versus $16,741 for females. The per capita income for the town was $11,086. About 32.0% of families and 35.6% of the population were below the poverty line, including 41.6% of those under age 18 and 38.3% of those age 65 or over.

== Education ==
Beaufort County Schools operates public schools. Northside High School is the local high school.

Belhaven High School, an all-black school, was built in 1950. The school's first principal was Greene T. (GT) Swinson. In operation until the late 1960s or early 1970s, it was transformed into an elementary school, Belhaven Elementary. The school is no longer in operation.

There is a private school, Pungo Christian Academy (K-12) which was opened in 1968 as a segregation academy.

BHM Regional Library operates the Belhaven Public Library.

== Notable people ==
- Eva Narcissus Boyd, singer, known professionally as "Little Eva"; performer of "the Locomotion"
- C. J. Wilson - Oakland Raiders football player
