= ECU Health Bertie Hospital =

Hospital in North Carolina, US

- Bertie Memorial Hospital
- U.S. National Register of Historic Places
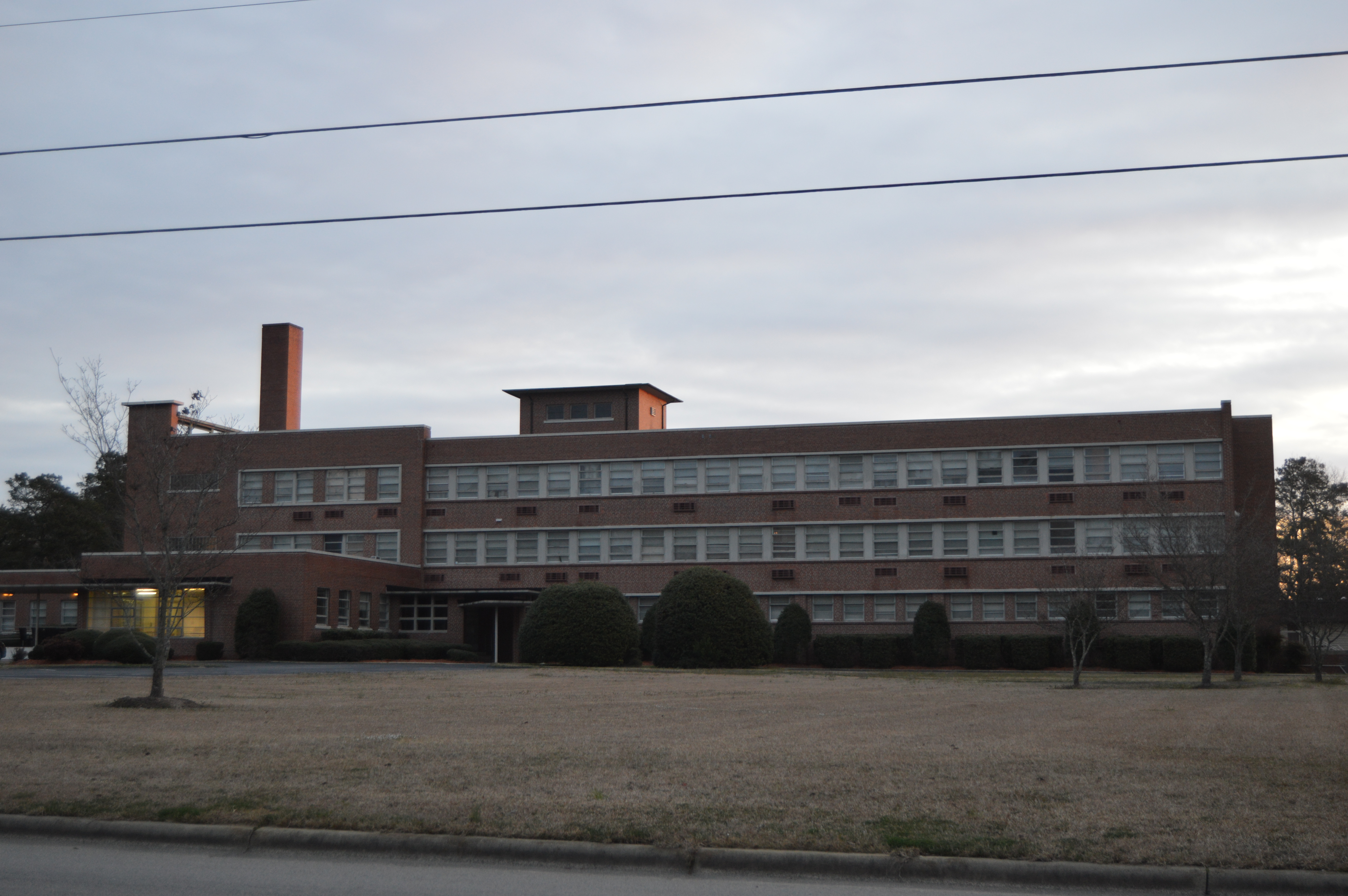
- Front of the hospital

- Location within North Carolina Location within the United States
- Location: 1403 South King St., Windsor, North Carolina
- Coordinates: 36°0′0″N 76°57′13″W
- Area: 3.6 acres (1.5 ha)
- Built: 1952
- Architect: George Watts Carr
- Architectural style: International Style
- NRHP reference No.: 04000647
- Added to NRHP: June 22, 2004

Bertie Memorial Hospital is a critical access hospital located in Windsor, North Carolina. It is a part of ECU Health. The original hospital opened in 1952 with Hill-Burton Act funding. It is a three-story, masonry, International Style building with a flat roof. It closed temporarily in 1985 and underwent several turnovers in management. Vidant Health (renamed ECU Health in 2022) took over management in 1998 and provided money for a new hospital in September 2001. The hospital was the first in the nation constructed according to Critical Access Hospital standards. The federal Office of Rural Health Policy has designated it a national model for Critical Access Hospital construction. The hospital concentrates on same-day services. It has six general hospital beds.

It was listed on the National Register of Historic Places in 2004.
