= ECU Health Medical Center =

Hospital in Greenville, North Carolina, U.S.

Coordinates: 35.6076953°N 77.4040653°W

- ECU Health

Geography
- Location: Greenville, North Carolina, United States

Organization
- Type: General, Specialist, and Teaching
- Affiliated university: Brody School of Medicine at East Carolina University
- Network: ECU Health

Services
- Emergency department: Level I trauma center
- Beds: 974

Helipads
- Helipad: Yes (FAA LID: NC91)

History
- Founded: 1923 - Pitt Community Hospital; 1934 - Pitt General Hospital; 1949 - Pitt County Memorial Hospital; 1998 - University Health Systems of Eastern Carolina - Pitt County Memorial Hospital; 2012 - Vidant Medical Center, Vidant Health; 2022 - ECU Health Medical Center, ECU Health

Links
- Website: https://locations.ecuhealth.org/greenville/ecu-health-medical-center.html
- Lists: Hospitals in the United States

ECU Health Medical Center (previously Pitt County Memorial Hospital and Vidant Medical Center) is a hospital located in Greenville, North Carolina, United States. It is the primary teaching hospital for East Carolina University's Brody School of Medicine and is the flagship medical center for ECU Health. ECU Health is a Level 1 Trauma Center, one of 6 in the state of North Carolina. It is the only level I trauma center east of Raleigh, and thus is the hub of medical care for a broad and complicated rural region of over 2 million people. ECU Health Medical Center is the largest employer in Eastern North Carolina and 20th overall in the state.

ECU Health Medical Center was licensed for 974 beds in fiscal year 2020. Of the 974 beds, 847 are general beds, 75 are rehab beds, and 52 are psychiatric beds. The hospital has 37 operating rooms: 26 rooms are Shared Inpatient/Ambulatory Surgery; four rooms are C-Section; three rooms are Other Inpatient; four rooms are Endoscopy.

The facility was originally known as Pitt Community Hospital and was located near downtown Greenville. In 1934, it changed to Pitt General Hospital, and then again to Pitt County Memorial Hospital (PCMH) in 1949. The hospital moved to West Greenville in 1951, and then to its current location in 1977.

On August 17, 2011, it was announced PCMH would change its name to UHS Medical Center. The change failed to occur on the planned October 1, 2011. The UHS brand was taken, so the hospital system instead finally changed its name to Vidant Medical Center. At the time, Vidant Health claimed that Vidant is derived from the root "Vi" that is associated with "life" in Latin, and in fact "Vida" literally means "life" in Spanish.

On January 3, 2022, Vidant Health Announced that it would be rebranding as ECU Health, but it would take several months for the changes to become noticeable.

== History ==
=== Origins ===
Pitt Community Hospital (PCH), the precursor to Pitt County Memorial Hospital, was the vision of Greenville physician, Charles Laughinghouse. In 1923, he and three other physicians raised $85,000 to build the privately owned PCH. The hospital created a relationship with East Carolina Teachers' Training School. The first home of PCH came in 1924. It was temporarily located in Downtown Greenville, above H.L. Hodges' Hardware Store, at 210 East Fifth Street. On September 7, 1923, more than 800 people attended a reception honoring the hospital. The first night, Pitt County had its first surgical operation, an appendectomy.

PCH made its first move to a permanent home at the intersection of Johnston and Woodlawn Streets, east of downtown. The three-story hospital had 42 beds and two full-time physicians, with 16 nurses. From its opening, the hospital served as a place to train nurses. In 1930, a physician from Wilmington, T.M. Watson, started a practice for infants and children. By 1933–34, the Watson children's ward was built. Two additional wings were added to the east end to increase the bed capacity by 14 in 1935. In September 1935, the hospital split into two divisions to qualify for the Duke Endowment. Pitt Community Hospital became the professional division and Pitt General Hospital, became a non-profit organization. The Duke Endowment provided $1 per day for each charity patient. By 1939, an increase in patient admissions indicated that a new hospital would need to be built. It closed in 1951, once the new hospital opened.

=== Early expansions ===
By 1934, the hospital was renamed Pitt General Hospital and a children's ward was added. X-ray and laboratory equipment and eight more beds were added in two new wings. In 1940, the county commissioners made plans to purchase Pitt General Hospital, but World War II interrupted the plans. The Hill-Burton Act of 1946 provided the stimulus to construct a new hospital. Pitt County voters approved a $351,900 bond issue in 1947 to help with construction. A 17-acre (69,000 m^{2}) tract of land on the western edge of town was donated by the Jesse Moye family. Construction began on March 21, 1949.

=== Later expansions ===
In February 1951, Pitt County Memorial Hospital was opened with 120 beds and named for the county's World War II veterans. A few weeks before, on January 18, Secretary of the Army Kenneth Royall spoke at the dedication. A bond was passed in 1958 to increase the number of beds to 200. Its capacity was 205 by 1963, but the hospital was still too small. Local civic leaders, Charles Gaskins, Wilton Duke, and Joe Pou, helped facilitate the passage of a $9 million bond referendum for the construction of a new 350-bed hospital. The hospital employed approximately 80 physicians in 1972. The Department of Family Medicine was organized a year later.

With help from both the bond and federal grants, construction began on the new hospital in 1974. A year later, the hospital and the medical school signed a joint affiliation agreement. The new hospital on a 100-acre (0.40 km^{2}) site opened in April 1977 with 355-beds. A larger rehabilitation center and the first class of the four-year medical students also started that year. A neonatal intensive care unit was established and East Carolina University (ECU) opened the Family Practice Center in 1978. A year later, a cardiac catheterization lab opened. The first kidney transplant was performed here in 1981 and the 138-bed West tower opened a year later. Level II trauma designation was achieved in 1983. The hospital performed its first open heart surgery in 1984. EastCare, the medical ground and helicopter transport, Level I trauma designation, Magnetic resonance imaging and laser surgery all began in 1985. The School of Medicine's and the hospital's pediatric services were all consolidated to the Children's Hospital of Eastern Carolina in 1986. By 1987, the hospital employed 2,300 people with 560 beds. The Ronald McDonald House began construction that year.

During the 1990s, the 143-bed North Tower was constructed. Also, a new Heart Center, a 12-bed pediatric intensive care unit and a family birthing center were all built during the decade. Off site, the outpatient SurgiCenter opened. In the mid-1990s, hospital administrators realized the only way for the hospital to survive in the dynamic health-care environment that a change was needed. Privatization was a way to streamline the decision-making process to make it more competitive against other hospitals. A vocal group of residents did not want the hospital to change from public to private. The county commissioners decided for privatization by a narrow margin. The hospital went from a public, not-for-profit to private not-for-profit in 1998. PCMH came under the umbrella of University Health Systems of Eastern Carolina (UHS) in 1999; UHS manages or owns eight hospitals in eastern North Carolina. That year, the hospital employed 4,150. The Wellness Center opened in 2000 and the first successful procedure in the United States using the da Vinci Surgical System was performed by East Carolina University surgeon Randolph Chitwood. It was the second such procedure in the world. EastCare purchased its second helicopter and the hospital began construction of a four-story emergency department with a roof helipad that year. The Gamma Knife was brought to the hospital in 2005. ECU Health Medical Center was designated a Primary Stroke Center in 2007 by the Joint Commission. It is the only primary stroke center east of Interstate 95 in North Carolina. The East Carolina Heart Institute at ECU Health Medical Center, a way to reshape cardiovascular health in the state, was opened in 2009. That year, the hospital employed 7,373.

In September 2010, a new interfaith chapel opened. The $2.3 million cost all came from private donations. The facility includes a 100-seat chapel, several meditation rooms and an outdoor reflecting pool.

The hospital started operation on a Gamma knife system to help treat brain cancer in 2013. It is one of two in the state.

== ECU Health Cancer Center ==
In May 2014, ECU Health announced plans for a new 6-story, 96-bed cancer facility set to open in 2018. The facility, which in all will encompass over 400,000 square feet, broke ground in March 2015. Some of the major features of the facility include 96 inpatient rooms with nurse, patient and family zones; an imaging center; infusion and radiation treatment clinics; and pharmacy and laboratory facilities. The facility will also include a number of courtyards, gardens, and other natural areas; as well as research and conference space.

== James and Connie Maynard Children's Hospital ==
James and Connie Maynard Children's Hospital

Services
- Emergency department: Level I Pediatric Trauma Center
- Beds: 197

History
- Founded: 1986 (Original Building); 2013 (Current Building)

Links
- Website: Maynard Children's

The James and Connie Maynard Children's Hospital is the only children's hospital in eastern North Carolina. The hospital treats infants, children, teens, and young adults aged 0–21. It sees over 42,000 pediatric patients a year.

=== History ===
The hospital was created in February 1986 when the School of Medicine and the hospitals pediatric services were all consolidated.

Before the Children's Hospital was created, approximately 24 beds were designated for pediatric patients and two beds in the newborn nursery were reserved as neonatal intensive care beds when the new hospital opened in April 1977. On July 1, 1978, a 33-bed neonatal intensive care unit was opened; in February 1985 a new pediatric intensive care unit (PICU) was constructed.

The Children's Hospital officially opened in 1986. A 12-bed PICU was completed in February 1995. The hospital operates under the "hospital within a hospital" concept. The hospital contains 122 beds. Fifty beds are for the Level III Neonatal Intensive Care Unit, a 16-bed convalescent nursery, and a high-risk obstetrical delivery service. Also, there are 42-beds for a New Born Nursery, 32-beds for Pediatrics, and 12-beds for a PICU. Over 6,500 children under the age of 21 are treated each year.

A program housed in the hospital is Center for Children with Complex and Chronic Conditions (C5). C5 is a joint venture with the hospital and East Carolina University's Brody School of Medicine. The program promote optimal health, growth, development, safety, comfort and overall well-being for children with special health care needs. The hospital houses the inpatient, while an outside BSOM facility houses the outpatient functions. The program combines multiple fields of study including physicians, nurse practitioners, registered nurses, a respiratory therapist, a social worker and a child life specialist. The teams works with medically weak and machine-dependent children. The program is funded through The Duke Endowment.

In September 2007 it was announced that a new children's hospital would be built. The Children's Hospital is expanding starting in 2010. The three phase project will be a free standing building. It will initially have four floors and will support future growth to six floors. The first phase for the $48.2 million project was completed in June 2013. It will increase the current Children's Hospital by 78,000 square feet (7,200 m^{2}). The overall theme will be aquatic will waves, bubbles and fishes.

The first floor will include a Ronald McDonald suite for patients families, exam rooms, nine-bed Medical/Day unit for outpatient services and a theater. Also included will be a pediatric radiology department that will house ultrasound imaging, radiology, fluoroscopy and other interventions, pediatric observation unit and a family resource center. The lobby will have testing center, a café, gift shop and breastfeeding support rooms. A play/therapy yard will include swings, basketball court, climbing structures and picnic tables.

=== Facilities ===
The second floor will have a 21 private bed convalescent newborn unit and a six-bed Kids Immunosuppressed Special Unit with a controlled environment for children with cancer, blood disorders, sickle cell disease, kidney disorders and other illnesses that compromise the immune system.

Along with the new addition to the Children's Hospital, ECU Health Medical Center is designing a pediatric emergency department. It will be a 13,000 square feet (1,200 m^{2}) area near the existing emergency department. It will include 16 general pediatric emergency rooms, a dedicated resuscitation room, lobby area, ambulance entry and staff/support space. The $8 million project was completed in April 2012.

On May 17, 2011, East Carolina University alumnus, James Maynard, founder of Golden Corral, and his wife Connie donated $10.5 million to the children's hospital. Nine million will go to the children's hospital itself, while the other $1.5 million will fund a distinguished professorship in the Department of Pediatrics. The new hospital will be named after them.

The hospital is a part of the Children's Miracle network. Dr. Ronald Perkin and Dr. David Rodeberg serve as co-directors.

=== Patient Care Units ===
- A General Pediatrics Care Unit
- Neonatal Intensive Care Unit
- Pediatric Intensive Care Unit
- Kids Immunosuppressed Specialty Unit
- Pediatric Day/Medical Unit
- Special Care Nursery
- Children's Emergency Department
- Pediatric Rehabilitation Unit
- Pediatric Palliative Care Unit

== East Carolina Heart Institute at ECU Health Medical Center ==
The East Carolina Heart Institute at ECU Health Medical Center opened in January 2009. The $160 million patient tower is six-story, 375,000-square-foot (34,800 m^{2}) inpatient care facility is home to 120 inpatient cardiovascular beds, six operating rooms and 11 interventional laboratories. The sixth floor also covers Orthopedic inpatients with and without cardiovascular problems. It also has an in house Total Joint Program run by the hospitals Physical Therapy Department. ECU and ECU Health Medical Center reorganized their cardiovascular services, aligning them by disease processes rather than traditional academic disciplines. The move brings cardiologists, heart surgeons and vascular surgeons together and promises to increase communication. Its sister tower, East Carolina Heart Institute at ECU, is the education and outpatient care facility.

The Cardiac Intensive Care Unit received the Beacon Award for Critical Care Excellence for Spring 2009–2010. The award comes from the American Association of Critical-Care Nurses.

== Rankings ==
The American Heart Association and the American Stroke Association awarded ECU Health Medical Center with the 2010 Get With The Guidelines Stroke Gold-Plus and Silver in the Heart Failure category, recognizing ECU Health Medical Center for maintaining high-quality stroke care for at least 24 consecutive months. It is the only hospital east of Interstate 95 recognized for it. Vidant Medical Center and ECU Health has been one of the most highly integrated health care networks for the past seven consecutive years. Working Mother magazine named Vidant Medical Center one of the top 100 companies for working mothers in 2009.

== Leadership ==
ECU Health Medical Center is governed by a board of trustees. According to ECU Health, "Members are charged with bringing the community’s voice to the health care system and, in turn, sharing the organization’s story in the community. Board members serve voluntarily and without pay."

=== Board of trustees ===
As of June 1, 2022, below is the make-up of the ECU Medical Center Board of Trustees.

- Marcus S. Albernaz, MD
- Angela A. Allen
- Richard “Rich” Balot
- Kristin S. Braswell, Ed.D.
- Anthony C. “Tony” Cannon
- Shirley A. Carraway, Ed.D.
- Carlester T. Crumpler Jr.
- Roger L. “Vern” Davenport
- Deborah W. Davis
- Phillip R. “Phil” Dixon Sr.
- Michael C. “Mike” Fitzpatrick
- Christopher E. Jenkins
- Mary “Polly” Johnson, RN, MSN, FAAN
- J. Bryant Kittrell, III
- William C. Monk Jr.
- Philip G. Rogers, Ed.D.
- Diane N. Taylor
- Anand “Andy” Tewari, MD
- Donald A. Thompson Jr.
- Michael R. Waldrum, MD
