= ECU Health =

Hospital system in Greenville, North Carolina, US

- Type: Private
- Industry: Hospital network
- Predecessor: Vidant Health; University Health Systems of Eastern Carolina
- Founded: 1997; 29 years ago
- Headquarters: Greenville, North Carolina, U.S.
- Number of locations: Nine hospitals
- Area served: Eastern North Carolina
- Key people: Mike Waldrum (CEO)
- Revenue: US$ $596,844,427 (2024)
- Net income: US$ $34,135,158 (2024)
- Number of employees: 12,224 (2017)
- Website: www.ecuhealth.org

ECU Health (formerly Vidant Health) is an American not-for-profit, 1,447-bed hospital system that serves more than 1.4 million people in 29 Eastern North Carolina counties. The health system is made up of nine hospitals and more than 12,000 employees. ECU Health also includes wellness centers, home health and hospice services, a dedicated children's hospital, rehab facilities, pain management and wound healing centers and specialized cancer care. Their flagship hospital, ECU Health Medical Center, is a level I trauma center and serves as the teaching hospital for the Brody School of Medicine at East Carolina University in Greenville. Its smaller, community-based hospitals serve as patient feeders to the main hospital. The main hospital has shuttered services at these facilities only to reroute state licenses and permits back to the main hospital.

ECU Health is the largest private employer in Eastern North Carolina.

All nine ECU Health hospitals have achieved The Gold Seal of Approval for quality care by The Joint Commission, the leading accreditor of healthcare organizations in America.

In 2002, the organization implemented a program in which diabetes educators regularly visit rural clinics to improve glycemic control in African-American patients.

ECU Health changed their name from University Health Systems of Eastern Carolina in January 2012 to Vidant Health.

On January 3, 2022, Vidant Health announced that they would be rebranding as ECU Health. In the announcement, they indicated that it would take several months for the branding to be noticeable to the public.

== ECU Health-owned hospitals ==
- ECU Health Medical Center, Greenville - Flagship Hospital
- ECU Health Beaufort Hospital, Washington
- ECU Health North Hospital, Roanoke Rapids
- ECU Health Bertie Hospital, Windsor
- ECU Health Chowan Hospital, Edenton
- ECU Health Duplin Hospital, Kenansville
- ECU Health Edgecombe Hospital, Tarboro
- ECU Health Roanoke-Chowan Hospital, Ahoskie
- The Outer Banks Hospital, Nags Head (jointly owned with Chesapeake Regional Healthcare)

Former facilities:

- Vidant Pungo Hospital, Belhaven - Acquired 2011, closed 2014, demolished 2016

== Specialty facilities ==
- East Carolina Endoscopy Center
- East Carolina Heart Institute
- James & Connie Maynard Children's Hospital at ECU Health Medical Center
- Marion L. Shepard Cancer Center
- Onslow Radiation Oncology
- Service League of Greenville Inpatient Hospice
- ECU Health Behavioral Crisis Center
- ECU Health Cancer Care at the Eddie and Jo Allison Smith Tower in Greenville
- ECU Health Cardiovascular & Pulmonary Rehabilitation
- ECU Health Health Foundation
- ECU Health Home Health & Hospice
- ECU Health Medical Group Practices
- ECU Health Minor Emergency
- ECU Health Outpatient Rehabilitation
- ECU Health Pain Management Centers
- ECU Health Radiation Oncology
- ECU Health Sleep Centers
- ECU Health SurgiCenter
- ECU Health Wellness Centers
- ECU Health Wound Healing Centers

== Services ==
- Allergy and Asthma
- Arthritis and Rheumatology
- Bariatrics
- Behavioral Health
- Cancer
- Children's
- Dermatology
- Ear, Nose and Throat
- Emergency and Trauma
- Employee Health and Wellness
- Endocrinology
- Family Medicine and Primary Care
- Gastroenterology
- Geriatrics
- Heart and Vascular
- Home Health
- Hospice
- Immediate and Walk-In Care
- Nephrology
- Neurology and Neurosurgery
- Ophthalmology
- Orthopedics and Sports Medicine
- Pain Management
- Palliative Care
- Physical Medicine and Rehabilitation
- Pulmonology and Respiratory
- Radiology
- Sleep
- Surgery
- Therapy and Rehabilitation
- Transplant
- Urology
- Wellness and Prevention
- Women's
- Wound

== ECU Health EastCare ==
ECU Health EastCare provides critical care air and ground transport service to all of eastern North Carolina. There are multiple ground units, including one dedicated to children's transport. EastCare's five air units are located in Onslow, Nash, Craven, Wayne and Bertie counties. Both ground and air units provide rapid transportation and advanced medical care to critically ill and injured patients. Both air and ground transport programs serve all types of critical patients including trauma, cardiac, medical, high-risk obstetrics, burns, and pediatric.

== ECU Health Foundation ==
The ECU Health Foundation is an independent, non-profit, tax-exempt, charitable corporation that serves as the custodian for all financial gifts and bequests to ECU Health .

== Governing board ==
The governing board of ECU Health sets the policies that govern the operation and direction of ECU Health, ECU Health Medical Center and its subsidiaries. Members of the governing board meet monthly and are responsible for the articulation of its mission and values, the protection of assets and the quality of services. They serve voluntarily and without pay. Members of the governing board are chosen for their management experience and their standing as community leaders. They are chosen by the UNC Board of Governors and Pitt County Commissioners for a term of 5 years, not to exceed two consecutive terms.

ECU Health Board of Directors:

- Marcus S. Albernaz, MD
- Shirley A. Carraway, Ed.D.
- James W. "Jim" Chestnutt
- Charlester T. Crumpler, Jr.
- Ernest L. "Ernie" Evans
- Jimmy F. Garris
- Robert J. "Bob" Greczyn, Jr.
- W. Phillip "Phil" Hodges
- J. Bryant Kittrell, III
- C. Bynum Satterwhite
- Anand "Andy" Tewari, MD
