= ECU Health Chowan Hospital =

Coordinates: 36.0697965°N 76.6102219°W

Geography
- Location: Edenton, North Carolina, North Carolina, United States

Organization
- Affiliated university: ECU Health

Services
- Beds: 40

History
- Founded: 1947

Links
- Lists: Hospitals in North Carolina

Chowan Hospital is a critical access hospital located in Edenton, North Carolina. It is a part of the ECU Health system. In 1947 Chowan Hospital opened. It moved in 1950 and again to its present position in 1970. A wing was added in 1988. It joined with UHSEC in 1998. The Emergency Department at Pitt County Memorial Hospital was linked to Chowan Hospital in April 2001. The hospital has 49 general hospital beds and 40 general nursing home beds. It also has three Shared Inpatient/Ambulatory Surgery and one Endoscopy operating rooms.
