= ECU Health Edgecombe Hospital =

Coordinates: 35.9213753°N 77.5554935°W

Heritage Hospital
- ECU Health

Geography
- Location: Tarboro, North Carolina

Organisation
- Affiliated university: ECU Health

Services
- Beds: 101

History
- Founded: 1916

ECU Health Edgecombe Hospital, formerly Heritage Hospital, is a hospital located in Tarboro, North Carolina. It is a part of the ECU Health. Edgecombe General Hospital opened as a county-owned hospital in 1916. It succeeded Pittman Hospital, which opened in 1901. In 1959, the Hill-Burton Act helped combine Edgecombe General Hospital, with three other facilities. Edgecombe County sold the hospital to Hospital Corporation of America (HCA) in 1982. HCA opened a 127-bed facility in 1985, named Heritage Hospital. UHSEC bought Heritage Hospital in 1998 from HCA. The hospitals focus is as a community hospital. The hospital has 101 general and 16 rehabilitation hospital beds. It has five Shared Inpatient/Ambulatory Surgery, two Endoscopy, and one C-Section operating rooms.
