= Charlotte metropolitan area =

Coordinates: 35.23°N 80.84°W

Greater Charlotte
- Metropolitan Statistical Area
- Charlotte–Concord–Gastonia, NC–SC; Metropolitan Statistical Area
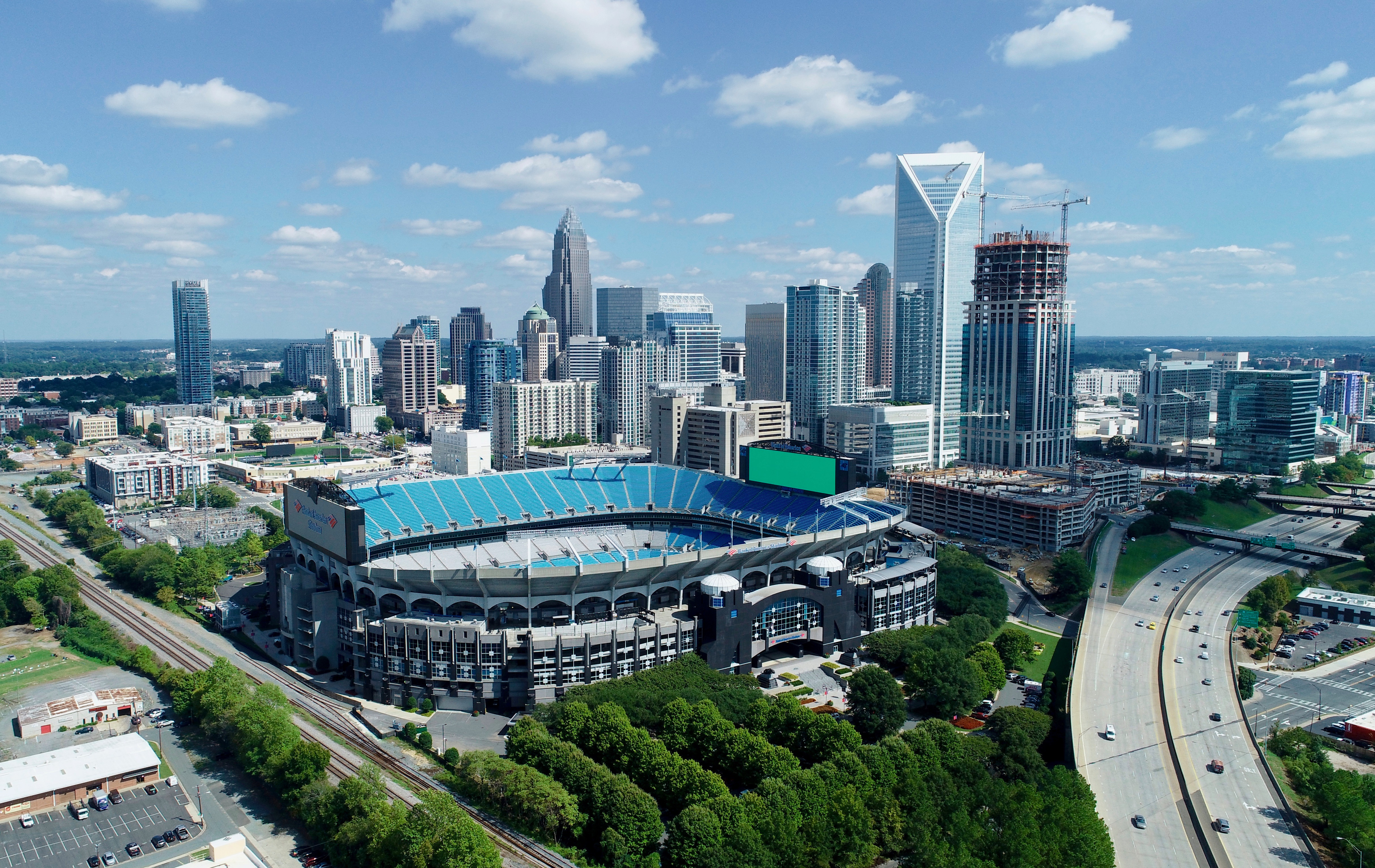
- Uptown Charlotte Skyline
Map of Charlotte–Concord, NC CSA
City of Charlotte
Charlotte–Concord–Gastonia, NC–SC MSA
Hickory–Lenoir–Morganton, NC MSA
Shelby–Kings Mountain, NC µSA
Albemarle, NC µSA
Marion, NC µSA
- Country: United States
- State: North Carolina; South Carolina
- Core city: Charlotte
- Principal cities: Concord; Gastonia; Rock Hill; Huntersville; Kannapolis; Mooresville; Hickory; Indian Trail; Monroe; Salisbury

Area
  - Metropolitan Statistical Area: 3,198 sq mi (8,280 km^{2})
  - Land: 3,149 sq mi (8,160 km^{2})
  - Water: 49 sq mi (130 km^{2})
- Elevation: 305–2,559 ft (93–780 m)

Population (2025)
  - Metro: 2,938,830 (21st)
  - Metro density: 824.1/sq mi (318.2/km^{2})
  - CSA: 3,387,115 (19th)

GDP
  - MSA: $228.9 billion (2022)
- Time zone: UTC-5 (EST)
  - Summer (DST): UTC-4 (EDT)
- Zip codes: 280xx; 281xx; 282xx; 286xx; 297xx
- Area codes: 704, 803, 839, 828, 980

The Charlotte metropolitan area (also referred to informally as Metrolina and to a lesser extent as Greater Charlotte) is a metropolitan area of the U.S. states of North and South Carolina, containing the city of Charlotte, North Carolina. The metropolitan area also includes the cities of Gastonia, Concord, Huntersville, and Rock Hill as well as the large suburban area in the counties surrounding Mecklenburg County, which is at the center of the metro area. Located in the Piedmont, it is the largest metropolitan area in the Carolinas, and the fourth largest in the Southeastern United States. The Charlotte metropolitan area is one of the fastest growing metropolitan areas in the United States.

There are two official metropolitan boundaries for the Charlotte metropolitan area: Charlotte–Concord–Gastonia, NC–SC Metropolitan Statistical Area (MSA) and Charlotte–Concord, NC–SC Combined Statistical Area (CSA), the latter of which additionally including Hickory–Lenoir–Morganton metropolitan area (MSA) and three micropolitan areas: Marion, Shelby and Albemarle.

The population of the MSA was 2,595,027 and the population of the CSA was 2,754,842 as of 2020 Census. In 2023, the Office of Management and Budget (OMB) issued new revised delineations for Combined Statistical Areas that included a 2022 population estimate of 3,333,992 for the new Charlotte–Concord, NC–SC CSA (that now includes the Hickory-Lenoir-Morganton Metropolitan Statistical Area and the Marion, Albemarle and Shelby Micropolitan Statistical Areas). The metropolitan area is slightly larger than 3,000 square miles (7,800 km^{2}). The new Combined Statistical Area definition is approximately 8,536 square miles (22,108 square km) in size.

The Charlotte metro area is a major financial center, transportation hub, and entertainment destination. Charlotte is the second largest financial hub in the United States behind New York City, being the headquarters for Bank of America and Truist Financial as well as housing the East Coast headquarters and largest employment hub of Wells Fargo. Other Fortune 500 companies headquartered in the metro area include Brighthouse Financial, Duke Energy, Honeywell, Lowe's, Nucor, Sonic Automotive, Albemarle and CommScope in the Hickory area. The Charlotte metro area is the largest manufacturing region in the Carolinas. The estimated gross metropolitan product (GMP) of the metro area is over $170 billion. Located in Mecklenburg County, Charlotte Douglas International Airport is the seventh-busiest airport in the world by aircraft movements and the city's location at the junction of I-85 and I-77 makes it a highway logistics center. The Charlotte metro is also one of the centers of American auto racing and is home to the Carolina Panthers, Charlotte Hornets, and Charlotte FC.

The Charlotte metro is home to a number of prominent higher education institutions, including the University of North Carolina at Charlotte, Queens University of Charlotte, Davidson College, Belmont Abbey College, Winthrop University and many more. The larger region is also home to respected institutions such as Gardner-Webb University, Lenoir–Rhyne University, Wingate University, and the Hickory campus of Appalachian State University. The primary community college for the area is Central Piedmont Community College, which has several campuses throughout Charlotte and the surrounding region.

== Nickname ==
Charlotte's most common nickname is the Queen City, often abbreviated as Q.C., a name derived from the city's namesake, Queen Charlotte of the United Kingdom.

=== Regional identity ===
The regional area around the city was at one time called Metrolina, a portmanteau of Metropolis and Carolina. The term has fallen out of widespread general use, though it still maintains a presence and is used by the North Carolina Department of Transportation. The term does retain a marketing value, and is thus also used by many businesses in the area. Metrolina refers to the region that includes the cities of Charlotte, Concord, Gastonia and Rock Hill. The name Metrolina came into fashion when North Carolina's other two large metropolitan areas took on nicknames—the Triangle for Raleigh/Durham/Cary/Chapel Hill and the Triad for Greensboro/Winston-Salem/High Point. (The Triad now goes by the name Piedmont Triad to distinguish it from other tri-cities.)

The term "Charlotte USA" referred to the 16-county region, which includes 12 counties in North Carolina and 4 counties in South Carolina. The term was championed during a marketing campaign by the Charlotte Regional Partnership, a non-profit organization made up of both private- and public-sector members from throughout the Charlotte region. This organization represents one of seven officially designated economic development regions in North Carolina.

Region F of the North Carolina Councils of Government, of which a majority of the Charlotte area municipalities and counties belong, uses the term Centralina in its body's name, Centralina Council of Governments. This term, however, is used only sparingly among locals.

== Geography ==
Historical populations
Census	Pop.	Note	%±
1950	197,052		—
1960	272,111		38.1%
1970	409,370		50.4%
1980	637,218		55.7%
1990	1,162,093		82.4%
2000	1,499,293		29.0%
2010	2,243,960		49.7%
2020	2,660,329		18.6%
2025 (est.)	2,938,830		10.5%
U.S. Decennial Census; 1790–1960 1900–1990; 1990–2000 2010 2020

=== Counties ===
The official Charlotte metropolitan area includes the Charlotte–Concord–Gastonia MSA (Anson, Cabarrus, Gaston, Iredell, Lincoln, Mecklenburg, Rowan, and Union counties in North Carolina; and Chester, Lancaster and York counties in South Carolina). The Charlotte CSA includes all the MSA counties along with two micropolitan areas in North Carolina – Albemarle (Stanly County) and Shelby (Cleveland County). (Census Bureau definition for CSA)

The Charlotte Regional Partnership also identifies three additional counties to what they refer to as the "Charlotte Region"—Alexander and Catawba counties in North Carolina, and Chesterfield County, South Carolina. Catawba and Alexander counties are currently part of the Hickory–Lenoir–Morganton Metropolitan Statistical Area or "the Unifour". Factoring in the Unifour, as well as Chesterfield County, if one considers these regions to be part of the Charlotte area, as many in the area regard them as such, the population according to 2018 Census estimates, increases to 3,190,390. If this population was officially used, the Charlotte Area would become the 20th largest CSA, overtaking the St. Louis, Missouri area, and placing it behind Portland, Oregon.

County	State	Seat	2025 Estimate	2020 census	Change	Area	Density
Mecklenburg	North Carolina	Charlotte	1,233,383	1,115,482	+10.57%	523.84 sq mi (1,356.7 km^{2})	2,355/sq mi (909/km^{2})
York	South Carolina	York	306,887	282,090	+8.79%	680.60 sq mi (1,762.7 km^{2})	451/sq mi (174/km^{2})
Union	North Carolina	Monroe	267,674	238,267	+12.34%	631.52 sq mi (1,635.6 km^{2})	424/sq mi (164/km^{2})
Cabarrus	North Carolina	Concord	249,725	225,804	+10.59%	361.75 sq mi (936.9 km^{2})	690/sq mi (267/km^{2})
Gaston	North Carolina	Gastonia	246,558	227,943	+8.17%	356.03 sq mi (922.1 km^{2})	693/sq mi (267/km^{2})
Iredell	North Carolina	Statesville	211,798	186,693	+13.45%	573.83 sq mi (1,486.2 km^{2})	369/sq mi (143/km^{2})
Rowan	North Carolina	Salisbury	155,096	146,875	+5.60%	511.37 sq mi (1,324.4 km^{2})	303/sq mi (117/km^{2})
Lancaster	South Carolina	Lancaster	114,296	96,016	+19.04%	549.16 sq mi (1,422.3 km^{2})	208/sq mi (80/km^{2})
Lincoln	North Carolina	Lincolnton	98,654	86,810	+13.64%	297.94 sq mi (771.7 km^{2})	331/sq mi (128/km^{2})
Chester	South Carolina	Chester	33,001	32,294	+2.19%	580.66 sq mi (1,503.9 km^{2})	57/sq mi (22/km^{2})
Anson	North Carolina	Wadesboro	21,758	22,055	−1.35%	531.45 sq mi (1,376.4 km^{2})	41/sq mi (16/km^{2})
Total			2,938,830	2,660,329	+10.47%	5,598.15 sq mi (14,499.1 km^{2})	525/sq mi (203/km^{2})

Additional counties included in combined statistical area
County	2022 estimate	2020 census	Change	Area	Density
Catawba County	163,462	160,609	+1.78%	401.40 sq mi (1,039.6 km^{2})	407/sq mi (157/km^{2})
Cleveland County	100,670	99,519	+1.16%	464.25 sq mi (1,202.4 km^{2})	217/sq mi (84/km^{2})
Burke County	87,881	87,573	+0.35%	514.24 sq mi (1,331.9 km^{2})	171/sq mi (66/km^{2})
Caldwell County	80,492	80,664	−0.21%	474.61 sq mi (1,229.2 km^{2})	170/sq mi (65/km^{2})
Stanly County	64,153	62,504	+2.64%	395.09 sq mi (1,023.3 km^{2})	162/sq mi (63/km^{2})
McDowell County	44,753	44,577	+0.39%	445.35 sq mi (1,153.5 km^{2})	100/sq mi (39/km^{2})
Alexander County	36,512	36,491	+0.06%	260.00 sq mi (673.4 km^{2})	140/sq mi (54/km^{2})
Total for Alexander, Burke, Caldwell, Catawba, Cleveland, McDowell and Stanly counties	577,923	571,937	+1.05%	2,954.94 sq mi (7,653.3 km^{2})	195/sq mi (75/km^{2})
Total for entire Charlotte CSA	3,333,992	3,232,266	+3.15%	8,556.00 sq mi (22,159.9 km^{2})	390/sq mi (150/km^{2})

=== Largest cities and towns ===
Rank	City / town	County	2024 estimate	2020 census	Change
1	Charlotte	Mecklenburg County	943,476	874,579	+7.88%
2	Concord	Cabarrus County	112,395	105,240	+6.80%
3	Gastonia	Gaston County	85,535	80,411	+6.37%
4	Rock Hill	York County	75,798	74,372	+1.92%
5	Huntersville	Mecklenburg County	67,087	61,376	+9.30%
6	Kannapolis	Cabarrus County / Rowan County	60,521	53,114	+13.95%
7	Mooresville	Iredell County	52,884	50,193	+5.36%
8	Hickory	Catawba County / Burke County / Caldwell County	45,081	43,491	+3.66%
9	Indian Trail	Union County	43,867	39,997	+9.68%
10	Monroe	Union County	40,054	34,562	+15.89%
11	Salisbury	Rowan County	36,579	35,540	+2.92%
12	Fort Mill	York County	36,244	24,521	+47.81%
13	Cornelius	Mecklenburg County	34,366	31,412	+9.40%
14	Matthews	Mecklenburg County / Union County	32,048	29,435	+8.88%
15	Statesville	Iredell County	31,693	28,419	+11.52%
16	Mint Hill	Mecklenburg County / Union County	28,825	26,450	+8.98%
17	Waxhaw	Union County	23,178	20,534	+12.88%
18	Shelby	Cleveland County	22,778	21,913	+3.95%
19	Harrisburg	Cabarrus County	20,335	18,967	+7.21%
20	Mount Holly	Gaston County	18,723	17,703	+5.76%
21	Lenoir	Caldwell County	18,280	17,703	+3.26%
22	Morganton	Burke County	17,825	17,473	+2.01%
23	Stallings	Union County / Mecklenburg County	17,617	16,112	+9.34%
24	Albemarle	Stanly County	17,344	16,422	+5.61%
25	Davidson	Mecklenburg County / Iredell County	16,276	15,106	+7.75%
26	Belmont	Gaston County	16,044	15,010	+6.89%
27	Weddington	Mecklenburg County / Union County	14,391	13,181	+9.18%
28	Tega Cay	York County	14,294	12,832	+11.39%
29	Newton	Catawba County	13,571	13,146	+3.23%
30	Lincolnton	Lincoln County	12,353	11,091	+11.38%
31	Kings Mountain	Cleveland County / Gaston County	11,797	11,142	+5.88%
32	Pineville	Mecklenburg County	11,567	10,602	+9.10%

!

=== Cities and towns: 5,000 to 10,000 in population ===
Rank	City / town	County	2022 estimate	2020 census	Change
1	Wesley Chapel	Union County	9,040	8,681	+4.14%
2	Lancaster	Lancaster County	8,829	8,460	+4.36%
3	York	York County	8,648	8,503	+1.71%
4	Conover	Catawba County	8,571	8,424	+1.75%
5	Marion	McDowell County	7,492	7,711	−2.84%
6	Clover	York County	7,405	6,671	+11.00%
7	Unionville	Union County	6,875	6,643	+3.49%
8	Marvin	Union County	6,624	6,358	+4.18%
9	Cherryville	Gaston County	6,207	6,078	+2.12%
10	Dallas	Gaston County	6,084	5,927	+2.65%
11	Bessemer City	Gaston County	5,563	5,428	+2.49%
12	Cramerton	Gaston County	5,441	5,296	+2.74%
13	Chester	Chester County	5,187	5,269	−1.56%
14	Long View	Catawba County / Burke County	5,172	5,088	+1.65%
15	Sawmills	Caldwell County	5,019	5,027	−0.16%

=== Suburban towns and cities under 5,000 in population ===
- Badin, Stanly
- Belwood, Cleveland
- Boiling Springs, Cleveland
- Catawba, Catawba
- China Grove, Rowan
- Claremont, Catawba
- Cleveland, Rowan
- Earl, Cleveland
- East Spencer, Rowan
- Fairview, Union
- Faith, Rowan
- Fallston, Cleveland
- Fort Lawn, Chester
- Granite Falls, Caldwell
- Granite Quarry, Rowan
- Great Falls, Chester
- Grover, Cleveland
- Harmony, Iredell
- Heath Springs, Lancaster
- Hemby Bridge, Union
- Hickory Grove, York
- High Shoals, Gaston
- Hildebran, Burke
- Hudson, Caldwell
- Kershaw, Lancaster
- Kingstown, Cleveland
- Lake Park, Union
- Lake Wylie, York
- Landis, Rowan
- Lattimore, Cleveland
- Lawndale, Cleveland
- Locust, Stanly & Cabarrus
- Love Valley, Iredell
- Lowell, Gaston
- Lowrys, Chester
- Maiden, Catawba & Lincoln
- Marshville, Union
- McAdenville, Gaston
- McConnells, York
- Midland, Cabarrus
- Mineral Springs, Union
- Misenheimer, Stanly
- Mooresboro, Cleveland
- Mount Pleasant, Cabarrus
- New London, Stanly
- Norwood, Stanly
- Oakboro, Stanly
- Patterson Springs, Cleveland
- Polkville, Cleveland
- Ranlo, Gaston
- Richburg, Chester
- Richfield, Stanly
- Rockwell, Rowan
- Sharon, York
- Smyrna, York
- Spencer, Rowan
- Spencer Mountain, Gaston
- Stanfield, Stanly
- Stanley, Gaston
- Troutman, Iredell
- Valdese, Burke
- Waco, Cleveland
- Wingate, Union

=== Unincorporated communities ===
- Boger City, Lincoln
- Denver, Lincoln
- Elgin, Lancaster
- Enochville, Rowan
- Eureka Mill, Chester
- Frog Pond, Stanly
- Gayle Mill, Chester
- India Hook, York
- Indian Land, Lancaster
- Irwin, Lancaster
- JAARS Union
- Lancaster Mill, Lancaster
- Lesslie, York
- Light Oak, Cleveland
- Lowesville, Lincoln
- Newport, York
- Riverview, York
- South Gastonia, Gaston
- Westport, Lincoln

Changes in house prices for the area are publicly tracked on a regular basis using the Case–Shiller index; the statistic is published by Standard & Poor's and is also a component of the S&P 20-city composite index of the value of the U.S. residential real estate market.

== Transportation ==
=== Mass transit ===
The Charlotte Area Transit System (CATS) is the mass transit agency that operates local, express, bus rapid services that serves Charlotte and its immediate suburban communities in both North and South Carolina. CATS also operates light rail and streetcar lines. CATS is also building a commuter, light rail, streetcar network as a supplement to its established bus transit throughout the region. The LYNX Blue Line runs from Interstate 485, through SouthEnd, Uptown Charlotte, to the University of North Carolina at Charlotte. Plans are for it to stretch initially to Mooresville, Pineville, and Matthews. Charlotte-Douglas International Airport will be connected to the system by light rail.

Gastonia Transit, Concord Kannapolis Area Transit, My Ride Transit in Rock Hill, Western Piedmont Regional Transit Authority in Hickory, Salisbury Transit, and Iredell Area Transit System in Iredell County also provide fixed route bus services within the Greater Charlotte metropolitan region as well.

=== Roads ===
The Charlotte region is also served by 2 major interstate highways (I-85 and I-77), and their 2 spurs (I-277, and I-485). I-40 also passes through the center of Iredell County and west through the Greater Hickory area, which is the northern region of the Charlotte Combined Statistical area. Other major freeways include Independence Boulevard (east Charlotte to I-277), a portion of US 321 between Hickory and Gastonia, and Monroe Connector / Bypass, each projected to cost over $1 billion per project.

Other important US highways in the region include: US 74 (east to Wilmington, west to Asheville and Chattanooga), US 52 (through the far eastern part of the region), U.S. Route 321 (through Chester, York, Gastonia, Dallas, Lincolnton and Hickory), US 601 (passing east of Charlotte) and US 70 (through Salisbury, Statesville and Hickory).

Primary state routes include NC/SC 49, NC 16 (which extends north to Virginia), NC 73, NC 150, NC 18, NC 24, NC 27, SC 9 and SC 5.

=== Air ===
Charlotte Douglas International Airport is the main airport in the Charlotte area and the 6th busiest in the country by aircraft operations. In April 2007, Charlotte was the fastest growing airport in the US. The airport went on to surpass its sister US Airways hub in Philadelphia, Pennsylvania as one of the 30 busiest airports in the world in terms of passenger traffic. CLT is also supplemented by Concord-Padgett Regional Airport with service provided by Allegiant Air to several destinations. In addition, there are numerous other general aviation airports in the region including the Hickory Regional Airport (which is certified under 14 CFR Part 139 to host airline and unscheduled charter flights), Charlotte–Monroe Executive Airport, Rock Hill/York County Airport, Stanly County Airport, Lancaster County Airport, Mid-Carolina Regional Airport, Shelby–Cleveland County Regional Airport, Gastonia Municipal Airport, Lincolnton–Lincoln County Regional Airport, Foothills Regional Airport, Anson County Airport, Chester Catawba Regional Airport, Rutherford County Airport and the Statesville Regional Airport.

== Higher education ==
=== Four-year institutions ===
North Carolina

- Barber–Scotia College
- Belmont Abbey College
- Carolinas College of Health Sciences
- Catawba College
- Davidson College
- Elon University School of Law, Charlotte Campus
- Gardner–Webb University
- Appalachian State University, Hickory Campus
- Johnson & Wales University
- Johnson C. Smith University
- Lenoir-Rhyne University
- Livingstone College
- Montreat College
- Pfeiffer University
- Queens University of Charlotte
- Strayer University
- University of North Carolina at Charlotte
- Wake Forest University - Charlotte Center - MBA
- Wake Forest University School of Medicine, Charlotte Campus
- Wingate University

South Carolina

- Clinton College
- Winthrop University
- University of South Carolina-Lancaster

=== Two-year institutions ===
North Carolina

- Caldwell Community College & Technical Institute
- Catawba Valley Community College
- Central Piedmont Community College
- Cleveland Community College
- Gaston College
- McDowell Technical Community College
- Mitchell Community College
- Rowan–Cabarrus Community College
- South Piedmont Community College
- Stanly Community College
- Western Piedmont Community College

South Carolina

- York Technical College

=== Defunct institutions ===
- Charlotte School of Law (2006–2017, private for-profit law school)
- King's College (1901–2018, private for-profit two-year college)

== Healthcare ==
- Hospitals of the Atrium Health system
  - Carolinas Medical Center (Charlotte)
  - Levine Children's Hospital (Charlotte)
  - Carolinas Medical Center-Mercy (Charlotte)
  - Atrium Health Cabarrus (Concord)
  - Atrium Health Pineville (Pineville)
  - Atrium Health University City (Charlotte)
  - Atrium Health Union (Monroe)
  - Atrium Health Cleveland (Shelby)
  - Atrium Health Lincoln (Lincolnton)
  - Atrium Health Kings Mountain (Kings Mountain)
  - Atrium Health Stanly (Albemarle)
  - Atrium Health Union West (Matthews)
  - Atrium Health Lake Norman (Cornelius)
- Hospitals of the Novant Health system
  - Novant Health Presbyterian Medical Center (Charlotte)
  - Novant Health Hemby Children's Hospital (Charlotte)
  - Novant Health Rowan Medical Center (Salisbury)
  - Novant Health Charlotte Orthopedic Hospital (Charlotte)
  - Novant Health Matthews Medical Center (Matthews)
  - Novant Health Mint Hill Medical Center (Mint Hill)
  - Novant Health Huntersville Medical Center (Huntersville)
- Other hospitals
  - CaroMonth Regional Medical Center (Gastonia)
  - Iredell Memorial Hospital (Statesville)
  - Lake Norman Regional Medical Center (Mooresville)
  - W. G. (Bill) Hefner VA Medical Center (Salisbury)
  - Duke Lifepoint Frye Regional Medical Center (Hickory)
  - Catawba Valley Medical Center (Hickory)
  - UNC Health Blue Ridge (Morganton)
  - Broughton Hospital (Morganton)
  - UNC Health Caldwell (Lenoir)
  - Mission Hospital McDowell (Marion)
  - Piedmont Medical Center (Rock Hill)
  - Piedmont Medical Center (Fort Mill)
  - Medical University of South Carolina Health - Lancaster Medical Center (Lancaster)
  - Medical University of South Carolina Health - Chester Medical Center (Chester)

== Attractions ==
=== Nature and geography ===
The foothills of the Blue Ridge Mountains begin along the western edge of the region; the descent (the Fall Line) to the coastal plain begins along the eastern edge. Amid this varied topography, the Daniel Stowe Botanical Garden and several state parks (Morrow Mountain, Crowders Mountain, South Mountains, Lake Norman, Landsford Canal, Andrew Jackson) offer recreational opportunities, along with the Uwharrie National Forest just east and northeast of Albemarle, and the Sumter National Forest at the southwest corner of the area. Kings Mountain National Military Park is partially located in York County and in Cherokee County near Blacksburg, South Carolina.

=== Cultural attractions ===
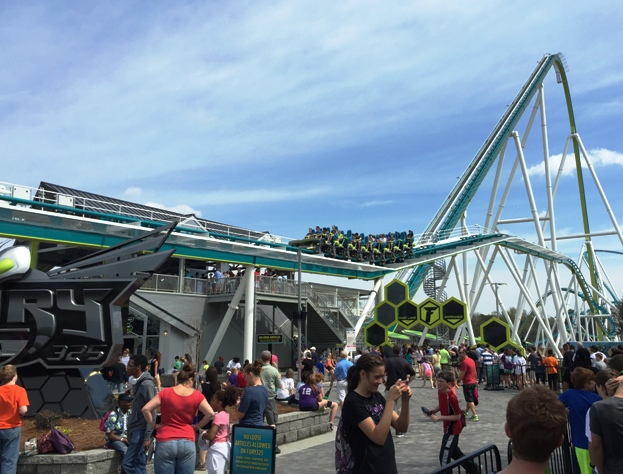
Fury 325 at Carowinds

Attractions in Charlotte include Carowinds theme park, Discovery Place, Spirit Square, NASCAR Hall of Fame, the North Carolina Blumenthal Performing Arts Center, Children's Theatre of Charlotte, Actor's Theatre of Charlotte, Carolina Actors Studio Theatre, Theatre Charlotte, the Charlotte Museum of History, Levine Museum of the New South, the McGill Rose Garden, and the Wing Haven Gardens. The Bechtler Museum of Modern Art and the Mint Museum in Uptown Charlotte are expanding the art venues in Charlotte.

Other places of interest in the surrounding area include the Schiele Museum (in Gastonia), Charlotte Motor Speedway (in Concord), the Carolina Raptor Center (in Huntersville), Daniel Stowe Botanical Garden (in Belmont), Latta Plantation (in Huntersville), Brattonsville Historic District (in McConnells), the North Carolina Transportation Museum (in Spencer), Fort Dobbs historical site (in Statesville), Catawba County Firefighters Museum (in Conover), the Arts & Science Center of Catawba Valley/Millholland Planetarium (in Hickory) the Museum of York County (in Rock Hill), James K. Polk historical site (in Pineville), the Catawba Cultural Center (in York County), the Museum of the Waxhaws (in Waxhaw), Glencairn Gardens (in Rock Hill), and the Reed Gold Mine (in Locust).

=== Entertainment ===
The Truliant Amphitheater is located in the University City area of Charlotte. The performing arts amphitheatre has hosted many popular music concerts.

The U.S. National Whitewater Center (USNWC) is an outdoor recreation and environmental education center. Alongside mountain-biking and running trails, a climbing center, and challenge course, the park's unique feature is a multiple-channel, customized whitewater river for rafting and canoe/kayak enthusiasts of all abilities. The USNWC is only 10 minutes from downtown Charlotte and provides roughly 400 acres (1.6 km^{2}) of woodlands along the Catawba River. Inspired by the successful Penrith Whitewater Stadium built for the 2000 Olympics and the stadium built for the 2004 Athens Games, the USNWC is the world's largest multi-channel recirculating whitewater river. The USOC has designated the USNWC an official Olympic Training Site.

=== Shopping ===
SouthPark Mall is one of the Southern United States' most upscale malls, including stores such as Louis Vuitton, Tiffany & Co., Burberry, Hermès, Neiman Marcus, and American Girl. SouthPark mall is also the largest mall in the Carolinas and one of the most-profitable malls in the United States.

Other large regional-scale Shopping malls include Northlake Mall, Carolina Place Mall, Concord Mills, Charlotte Premium Outlets, Phillips Place (across from SouthPark), RiverGate, Westfield Eastridge, Rock Hill Galleria, Carolina Mall, Monroe Crossing Mall, Signal Hill Mall, and Valley Hills Mall.

Concord Mills is unique in that it does not feature the typical anchor stores found at other malls; it focuses more on attracting outlet store tenants. The mall is visited by over 15 million people annually.

Alongside enclosed malls and strip centers are several other shopping districts. Several downtowns can claim an abundance of shopping options, along with restaurants and other entertainment, and a few other specific districts have emerged: Central Avenue, especially in the Plaza-Midwood area; the NoDa area of North Charlotte; and the Arboretum in southeast Charlotte (geographically, south), to offer a handful of examples. Several of these areas are at the center of the area's growing immigrant business communities.

=== Sports ===
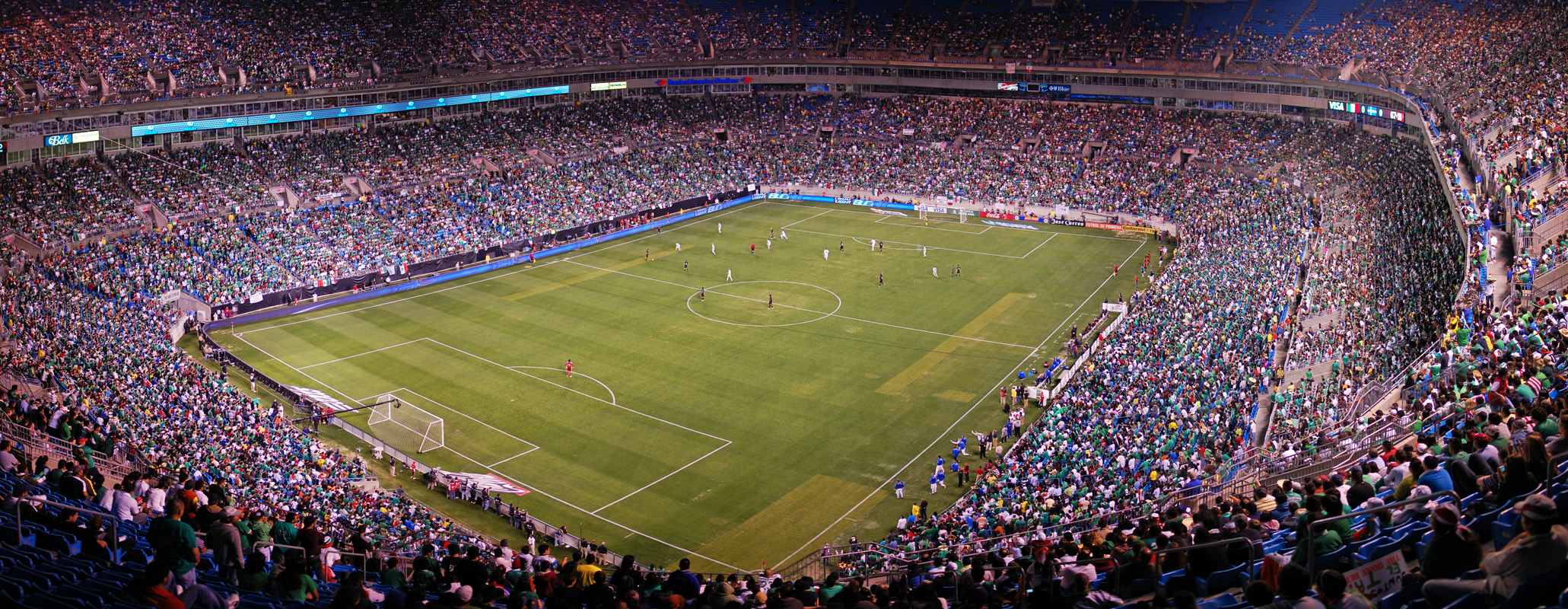
Bank of America Stadium, home of the Carolina Panthers and Charlotte FC

The highly popular Charlotte Motor Speedway is the largest sports venue in the area. Other venues include Bank of America Stadium (home of the NFL's Carolina Panthers and MLS's Charlotte FC), Spectrum Center (home of the NBA's Charlotte Hornets) and Bojangles' Coliseum (home of American Hockey League's Charlotte Checkers). The Charlotte Eagles of the United Soccer Leagues and the Hickory FC of the National Premier Soccer League call the area home, Truist Field (home of the Charlotte Knights, the Triple-A affiliate of the Chicago White Sox), and the Hickory Crawdads are a High-A Minor-League Baseball team and the Kannapolis Cannon Ballers are a Low-A Minor-League Baseball team located in this region.

== Economy ==
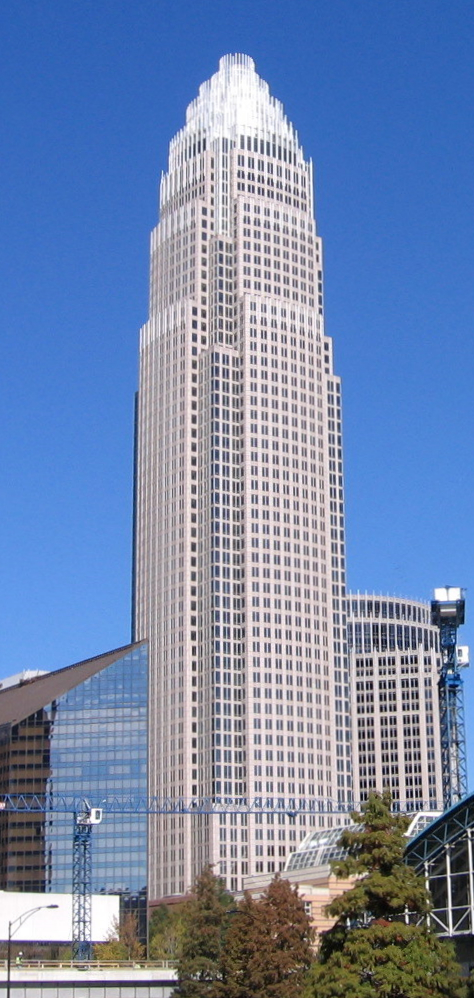
Bank of America Corporate Center, the headquarters for Bank of America

20 largest employers in the Charlotte metropolitan area (Q2 2019)
Name	Industry	Based in	Number of employees
1. Atrium Health	Health Care and Social Assistance	Charlotte	35,700
2. Wells Fargo	Finance and Insurance	San Francisco	26,000
3. Charlotte-Mecklenburg Schools	Educational Services	Mecklenburg County	18,495
4. Walmart	Retail Trade	Bentonville, Arkansas	16,100
5. Bank of America	Finance and Insurance	Charlotte	15,000
6. Novant Health	Health Care and Social Assistance	Winston-Salem, NC	12,172
7. American Airlines	Transportation and Warehousing	Dallas, Texas	11,000
8. Lowe's	Retail Trade	Mooresville, North Carolina	9,233
9. Food Lion	Retail Trade	Salisbury, North Carolina	8,465
10. Harris Teeter	Retail Trade	Matthews, North Carolina	8,239
11. Duke Energy	Utilities	Charlotte	7,700
12. Government of North Carolina	Public Administration	Raleigh, North Carolina	7,600
13. Compass Group	Manufacturing	Chertsey, England, UK	7,500
14. City of Charlotte	Public Administration	Charlotte	6,800
15. Mecklenburg County Government	Public Administration	Mecklenburg County	5,512
16. Union County Public Schools	Educational Services	Union County	5,427
17. U.S. Federal Government	Public Administration	Washington, D.C.	5,300
18. YMCA of Greater Charlotte	Arts, Entertainment and Recreation	Charlotte	4,436
19. CaroMont Health	Healthcare	Gastonia, North Carolina	4,223
20. AT&T Inc.	Utilities	Dallas, Texas	4,100

Companies with headquarters in the region include Bank of America, Belk, BellSouth Telecommunications, Bojangles', The Compass Group, Carolina Beverage Corporation Inc. (makers of Sun Drop and Cheerwine), Duke Energy, Family Dollar, Food Lion, Harris Teeter, Lance, Inc, LendingTree, Lowe's, Meineke Car Care Centers, Muzak, Nucor, Chiquita Brands International Transbotics, Royal & SunAlliance (USA), SPX Corporation, Time Warner Cable (a business unit of Fortune 500 company Time Warner), and Wells Fargo.

Charlotte has gained fame as the second largest banking and finance center in the U.S., and the area's orientation towards emerging industries is seen in the success of the University Research Park (the 7th largest research park in the country) and the redevelopment of part of the Pillowtex site in Kannapolis as a biotech research facility featuring the participation of University of North Carolina at Charlotte, University of North Carolina at Chapel Hill, Duke University and North Carolina State University.

Reflections Studios in Charlotte played an important role in the emergent late-20th-century American musical underground – R.E.M., Pylon, Let's Active, Don Dixon and Charlotte's Fetchin Bones (among many others) all recorded influential and acclaimed albums there. Charlotte-based Ripete and Surfside Records maintain important catalogs of regional soul and beach music, and the area has also played a role in the history of gospel, bluegrass and country music. The Milestone, one of the first punk clubs in the South, is located in west Charlotte, and in the past hosted legendary appearances from the likes of R.E.M., Black Flag, Nirvana, The Minutemen, D.O.A., Bad Brains, Charlotte's Antiseen, and many others.

== Local associations ==
A majority of the municipalities and counties in the North Carolina parts of the Charlotte metropolitan area belong to the Centralina Regional Council. Cleveland County belongs to the Isothermal Planning and Development Commission and Alexander and Catawba counties belong to the Western Piedmont Council of Governments.

== Notable residents ==
Notable people from the Charlotte metro area include:

- Artists – Romare Bearden
- Astronauts – Charles Duke and Susan Helms
- Business – Irwin Belk, Jim Crockett Jr., Elisabeth DeMarse, Jack Fulk, Herman Lay, Leon Levine, and Hugh McColl
- Religious figures – Billy Graham and Steven Furtick
- Musicians – Earl Scruggs, Dababy, George Clinton, Fred Durst, Prairie Prince, Blind Boy Fuller, The Avett Brothers, and Randy Travis
- Independent filmmakers – Tim Kirkman and Ross McElwee
- Actors – Randolph Scott, Dwayne Johnson, Nick Cannon, Ali Hillis, Chyler Leigh, Lauren Holt, Brian Huskey, Jim Rash, and Berlinda Tolbert
- Media – Jim Nantz, Heather Childers, and Anna Kooiman
- Politicians – Sue Myrick, Harvey Gantt, Elizabeth Dole, Mick Mulvaney, Jesse Helms; U.S. presidents Andrew Jackson and James K. Polk
- Professional wrestlers – Ric Flair, Charlotte Flair, Tessa Blanchard, Cedric Alexander, Cody Rhodes and R-Truth
- NASCAR drivers – Dale Earnhardt, Dale Earnhardt Jr. and William Byron
- Professional athletes – Stephen Curry, Seth Curry, Kyle Seager, Corey Seager, Hakeem Nicks, Bobby Jones, Walter Davis, Tommy Helms, Daniel Jones, Ray Durham, Chris Canty, Dwight Clark, Luke Maye, Stephon Gilmore, Ish Smith, Hoyt Wilhelm, Kennedy Meeks, Benjamin Watson, Cordarrelle Patterson, Rayjon Tucker, Jadeveon Clowney, Wendell Moore Jr., Jaden Springer, J. R. Sweezy, Patrick Williams, Grant Williams, Alex Wood, Hassan Whiteside and James Worthy
- R&B singers – Anthony Hamilton, Calvin Richardson, Stephanie Mills and K-Ci & JoJo of Jodeci
- Writers – Carson McCullers and Ayesha Curry

== See also ==
- North Carolina statistical areas
- Catawba Nuclear Station
- Interstate 85
- Piedmont Atlantic Megaregion
- Piedmont Crescent
- Upstate South Carolina
