= Carolinas Medical Center (disambiguation) =

Carolinas Medical Center is a hospital located in the Dilworth neighborhood of Charlotte, North Carolina, and is the largest and flagship hospital of Atrium Health.

Carolinas Medical Center may be used colloquially to refer to other Atrium Health acute care facilities in North Carolina:

- Atrium Health Cabarrus (formerly Carolinas Medical Center-Northeast) – A hospital located in Concord
- Atrium Health Lincoln (formerly Carolinas Medical Center-Lincoln) – A hospital located in Lincolnton
- Atrium Health Mercy (formerly Carolinas Medical Center-Mercy) – A hospital located in the Elizabeth neighborhood of Charlotte
- Atrium Health Pineville (formerly Carolinas Medical Center-Pineville) – A hospital located in Pineville
- Atrium Health Union (formerly Carolinas Medical Center-Union) – A hospital located in Monroe
- Atrium Health University City (formerly Carolinas Medical Center-University) – A hospital located in the University City area of Charlotte
