= Cabarrus College of Health Sciences =

Private college in Concord, North Carolina, US

Coordinates: 35.4387°N 80.6016°W

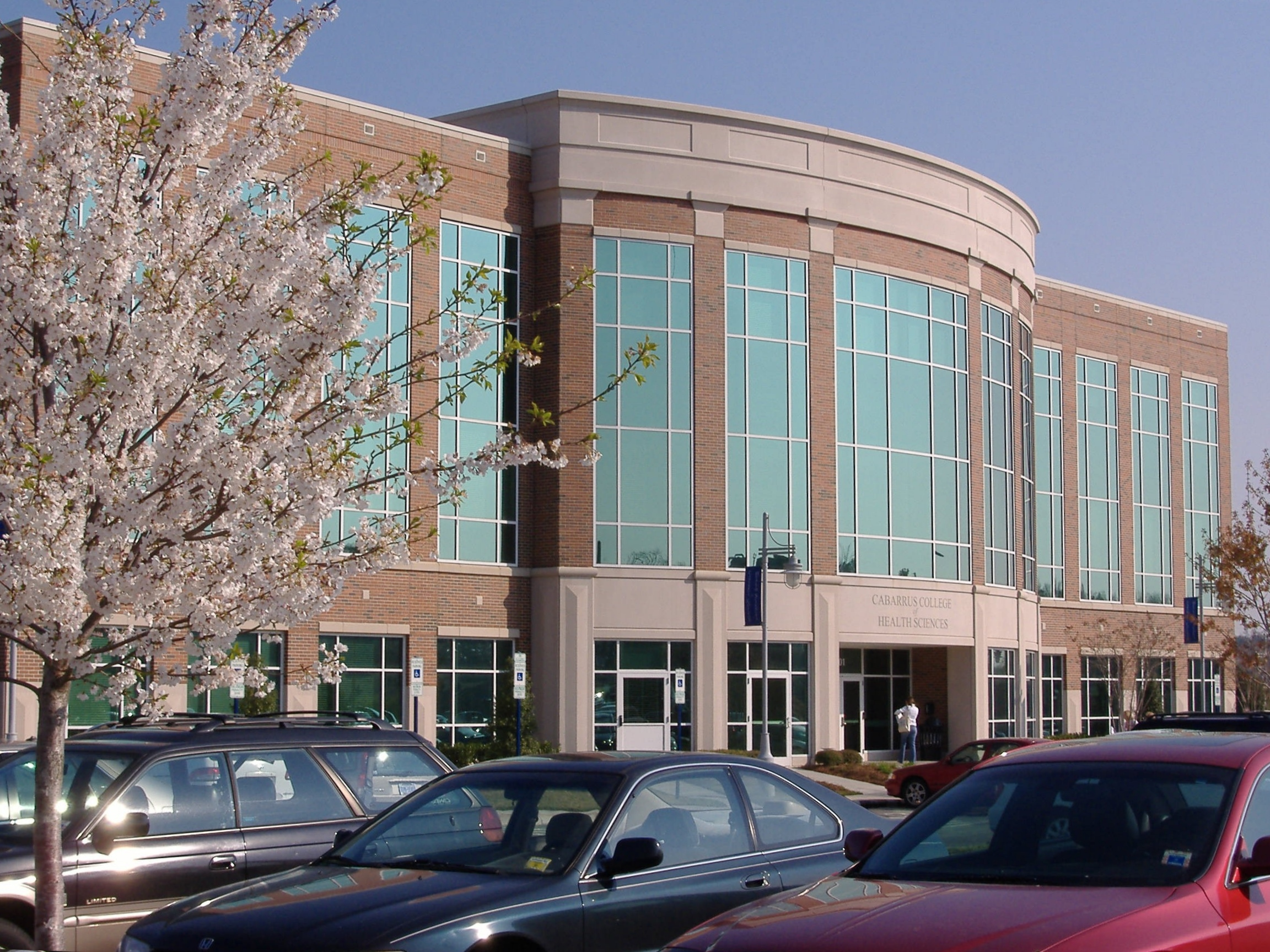
Cabarrus College of Health Sciences

Cabarrus College of Health Sciences is a private college for healthcare professions on the campus of Atrium Health Cabarrus in Concord, North Carolina. It is affiliated with Atrium Health, a hospital network with more than 70,000 employees and 1,400 care locations, and since its merger with Advocate Aurora Health in 2022, part of Advocate Health. The college offers 19 degree programs in 11 health science disciplines, with a mix of on-campus, online, and hybrid programs.

== History ==
Cabarrus College of Health Sciences evolved from the Cabarrus County Hospital School of Nursing, founded by Louise Harkey in 1942 as a three-year diploma program to meet the demand for registered nurses during World War II.

February 2, 1942: Sixteen students enter the new nursing school.

1940s–1950s: Dormitory, recreation, auditorium and classroom space expansion to accommodate enrollment growth.

1963: National League for Nursing (NLN) awards accreditation to the school.

1973: Curriculum revision shortens program to two years; North Carolina Board of Nursing approves the school as the first two-year, hospital-based nursing diploma program in North Carolina.

1992: Officially renamed as the Louise Harkey School of Nursing to mark the school's 50th anniversary and to honor its founder.

1996: The Louise Harkey School of Nursing becomes the cornerstone of the new Cabarrus College of Health Sciences, renamed in preparation for launching new allied health programs.

2004: The college partners with the Cabarrus Healthcare Foundation (formerly NorthEast Foundation) and the community to fund and build present facility on the campus of Atrium Health Cabarrus (formerly Northeast Medical Center/Carolinas HealthCare System NorthEast).

2014: First master's degree (Occupational Therapy) program added.

== Academics ==
Cabarrus College of Health Sciences is accredited by the Southern Association of Colleges and Schools Commission on Colleges (SACSCOC) The college offers diplomas, associate degrees, bachelor's degrees, and master's degrees.
