= L. Ebony Boulware =

American physician-scientist and clinical epidemiologist

Academic background
- Education: AB, English, 1991, Vassar College; MD, 1995, Duke University; M.P.H. 1999, Johns Hopkins Bloomberg School of Public Health

Academic work
- Institutions: Wake Forest School of Medicine; Duke University School of Medicine; Johns Hopkins School of Medicine

L. Ebony Boulware is an American general internist, physician-scientist, and clinical epidemiologist. She is the dean of Wake Forest University School of Medicine and chief academic officer of Advocate Health. Boulware formerly served as the Nanaline Duke Distinguished Professor of Medicine and director of the Clinical and Translational Science Institute at the Duke University School of Medicine.

== Early life and education ==
Boulware completed her Bachelor of Arts degree from Vassar College in 1991, where she also competed on their field hockey and women's basketball team. During her tenure at the school, she was named second team regional all-American, second team all-state, a recipient of the New York Scholar-Athlete Award, and a member of the National Academic Squad. As a senior in 1991, Boulware was named the Female Senior Athlete of the Year.

Upon graduating, Boulware earned her medical degree at Duke University in 1995 and her Master's degree in public health at Johns Hopkins Bloomberg School of Public Health. Following her medical degree, Boulware completed her residency and fellowship at the University of Maryland School of Medicine.

== Career ==
=== Johns Hopkins ===
Upon completing her formal education, Boulware became an assistant professor of medicine at the Johns Hopkins School of Medicine. By 2008, she won a bronze Telly Award for a video on the Talking About Living Kidney Donation study that she co-produced with a consortium of Johns Hopkins faculty and staff and the National Kidney Foundation of Maryland. Boulware was also promoted to the rank of associate professor with a joint appointment in the Department of Epidemiology.

As an associate professor, Boulware was the recipient of a David M. Levine Excellence in Mentoring Award at the Department of Medicine's Research Retreat. She was later appointed to a six-year term as a member of the Health Services Organization and Delivery Study Section of the Center for Scientific Review in the National Institutes of Health (NIH). In 2013, Boulware was inducted into the American Society for Clinical Investigation as someone who has "accomplished meritorious original, creative, and independent investigations in the clinical or allied sciences of medicine."

=== Duke ===
Boulware eventually left JHU to become the chief of the Division of General Internal Medicine at the Duke University School of Medicine on September 25, 2013. In this role, she was selected to serve as the contact principal investigator for Duke's Clinical and Translational Science Award (CTSA) from the NIH. A few days later, Boulware was also named the associate dean for clinical and translational science and director of Duke's Center for Community and Population Health Improvement. In October 2015, Boulware's Center for Community and Population Health Improvement received a funding award from the Patient-Centered Outcomes Research Institute "to conduct a series of county-wide colloquia and conferences to establish priorities and plans for comparative effectiveness studies that address health needs in Durham and surrounding North Carolina communities."

While working as the chief of the Division of General Internal Medicine in the Department of Medicine, Boulware was the recipient of the 2016 Society of General Internal Medicine's Mid-Career Research and Mentorship Award. In 2019, Boulware was elected to the National Academy of Medicine as someone who demonstrated outstanding professional achievement and commitment to service. She was also appointed the Eleanor Easley Distinguished Professor of Medicine.

During the COVID-19 pandemic, Boulware was honored with the Duke Medical Alumni Association's 2020 Distinguished Faculty Award. Following this, she also received an Innovation Award from the Duke Institute of Health Innovation to support her project Using Xealth to Manage Population Health and Engage Patients with Chronic Kidney Disease. The following year, Boulware was elected a member of the Association of American Physicians and a Fellow of the American Academy of Arts and Sciences.

=== Wake Forest and Advocate Health ===
In January 2023, Boulware left Duke to become the dean of Wake Forest University School of Medicine and serve as chief science officer and vice chief academic officer of Advocate Health. In December 2025, she assumed the role of chief academic officer for Advocate Health while continuing as dean. In these roles, she oversees academic affairs across Wake Forest University School of Medicine and Advocate Health, including the medical school campuses in Winston-Salem and Charlotte, North Carolina; more than 250 graduate medical education programs across Advocate Health; and Carolinas College of Health Sciences and Cabarrus College of Health Sciences.
