= Nwando =

Nwando is a feminine given name of Igbo origin. Notable people with the name include:

- Nwando Achebe (born 1970), Nigerian–American scholar
- Jacqueline Nwando Olayiwola, American physician
