= Francis Robicsek =

American surgeon (1925–2020)

Francis Robicsek (July 4, 1925 – April 3, 2020) was a Hungarian-American cardio-thoracic surgeon in Charlotte, North Carolina. Before moving to America, he was one of the surgeons to perform Hungary’s first heart valve replacement surgeries in 1954. He was North Carolina's first surgeon to perform heart bypass surgeries in 1956 and performed Charlotte's first heart transplant in 1986. He was the founder of the Sanger Clinic and the innovator of the Robicsek sternal weave technique.

== Childhood and education ==
Robicsek was born in Hungary as Ferenc Robicsek. He worked as a medical practitioner from 1945 to 1950 while earning his medical license from Péter Pázmány University. He was among the team of surgeons to perform the first heart valve replacement surgery in Hungary in 1954, which may have been the first example of human allotransplantation published.

== Career ==
Robicsek was associate professor of Cardiac Surgery at the University of Budapest when he was 28. He immigrated to America in 1956, joined Paul W. Sanger and began working at Charlotte Memorial Hospital (a.k.a. Carolinas Medical Center), now Atrium Health. He pioneered cardio-vascular procedures in North Carolina and performed the first heart transplant in that state in 1986.

Dr. Robicsek is renowned in the Cardiothoracic Surgery field for his innovative "Robicsek Weave," a technique for managing sternal instability that has set the standard for treating such conditions. He thoroughly analyzed the causes and mechanics of sternal instability and introduced effective treatments, including parasternal weaving and pectoralis major muscle padding. Beyond this, he has made significant strides in treating pectus deformities, advocating for a comprehensive approach that addresses not just the anatomical anomalies but also the psychological impacts on patients. His development of a combined modified Ravitch procedure with Marlex mesh placement for severe pectus excavatum cases has been particularly impactful.

Throughout his surgical career, he served as the Chairman of the Thoracic and Cardiovascular Surgery Department at Carolinas Medical Center in Charlotte, North Carolina, the Medical Director of the Carolinas Heart Institute, and President and Founder of the Sanger Clinic. He also maintained teaching positions as the Clinical Professor of Surgery at the University of North Carolina in Chapel Hill, and as an adjunct professor in Biomedical Engineering and Anthropology at the University of North Carolina at Charlotte.

In 1998, he retired from surgery, after operating on more than 50,000 patients. He continued his medical work through humanitarian medical outreach through Heineman Medical Outreach, Inc. and Atrium Health.

In adherence to his wishes, which he articulated before his April 2020 death, he was buried in his surgical scrubs.

== Philanthropy and humanitarian work ==
In 1968, when Paul W. Sanger died, he became President of Heineman Research, Inc. (a.k.a. Heineman Medical Outreach, Inc.) now Heineman-Robicsek Foundation, Inc., a research and humanitarian medical outreach organization in Charlotte.

Robicsek traveled to Central and South America to offer medical services. In 1976, he organized a medical team that worked following an earthquake in Honduras. He eventually established cardiac surgery in Guatemala and supported numerous hospitals and clinics in Central American and Caribbean countries. He wrote four books about Mayan culture and archeology; Copan: Home of the Mayan GodsA Study in Maya Art and History:The Mat SymbolThe Smoking Gods: Tobacco in Maya Art, History, and ReligionThe Maya Book of the Dead: The Ceramic Codex

He was an avid collector. He donated a significant art collection to the Mint Museum in Charlotte, NC and the Ruta Maya.

== Awards and recognition ==
- 1997: The Order of Quetzal (Orden del Quetzal), Commander.
- 2007: The World Affairs Council of Charlotte, World Citizen Award.
- 2013: Leadership Charlotte, Lifetime Achievement Award.
- 2017: American College of Surgeons, Humanitarian Award.
- 2018: the Sanger Heart and Vascular Institute endowed a $3.5 million chair in Robicsek’s name.
- 2019: Southern Thoracic Surgical Association Inspiration Award.

== Personal life ==
He married Livia Kadar, MD in 1953. They fled from Soviet-controlled Hungary together via East Berlin in 1956; they spent some time in an Austrian refugee camp before arriving to America and moved to Charlotte where his uncle, Andrew Roby was living. The couple had four children.
