= Jacqueline Nwando Olayiwola =

American family physician and public health professional

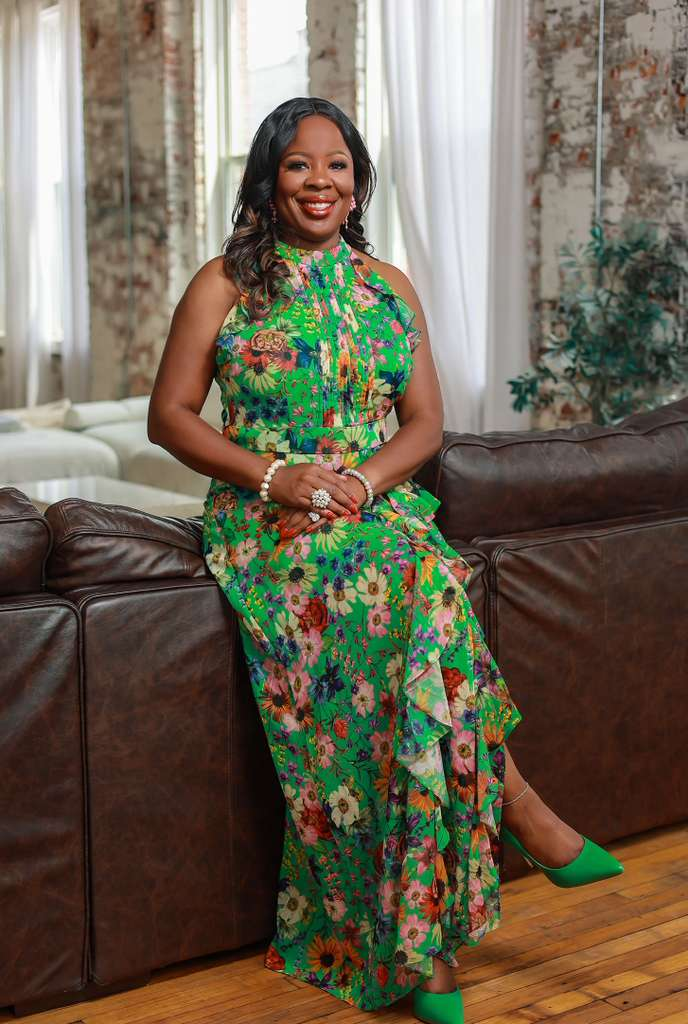
- Born: United States
- Education: Ohio State University; Columbia University; Harvard School of Public Health
- Known for: Health systems redesign, Innovation for the underserved, Telehealth and electronic consultations in primary care, Evidence based disparities improvement, Global health system transformation
- Awards: National Medical Association Top 40 Leaders Under 40 Award; Harvard Public Health Innovator Award; American Telemedicine Association Woman of the Year Award; UCSF Chancellor Diversity Award Martin Luther King, Jr. Leadership; Ohio State Homecoming Queen
- Scientific career
- Fields: Family & Community Medicine; Public Health; Health Policy & Management
- Workplaces: Advocate Health; Wake Forest University School of Medicine; Humana, Inc; Ohio State University Wexner Medical Center; RubiconMD; University of California, San Francisco; Community Health Center, Inc

Jacqueline Nwando Olayiwola (J. Nwando Olayiwola, nee Onyejekwe) is a Nigerian-American physician, professor, public health expert, philanthropist, and senior healthcare executive. She currently serves as the President of the Advocate National Center for Clinical & Community Impact and Senior Vice President at Advocate Health.

She is also Professor at Wake Forest University School of Medicine in the Department of Family & Community Medicine. Olayiwola is known for her work in community health, serving underserved patients, primary care innovation, and health system transformation across academic, managed care, healthcare delivery, public health, and technology sectors. She was inducted into the National Academy of Medicine in 2022 and the Ohio State University Hall of Fame in 2024.

== Early life and education ==
Olayiwola was born in the United States, while her parents were both immigrants from Nigeria.

She graduated from Bishop Watterson High School in Columbus, Ohio, in 1994, where she was a multi-sport scholar athlete and a National Achievement Scholar. She completed high school as a member of the National Honor Society, track and field team captain, district and regional champion in the 200 meter dash, girls 4x100 meter relay school record holder, and a starting forward on the district championship winning girls varsity soccer team.

In 1994, Olayiwola pursued her undergraduate degree at Ohio State University, majoring in Human Nutrition within the College of Human Ecology. Olayiwola graduated in 1997 with a Bachelors of Science and stayed at OSU for her medical degree within Ohio State College of Medicine. She obtained her M.D. in 2001, and then moved to New York City to pursue her Postdoctoral Residency in Family and Community Medicine at Columbia University. Her clinical work was conducted at the New York Presbyterian Hospital and she became the Chief Resident in Family Medicine during her time at Columbia. Following her Residency in 2004, Olayiwola moved to Boston where she completed her Master's in Public Health with a Concentration in Healthcare Management and Policy as a Commonwealth Fund Harvard University Fellow in Minority Health Policy at Harvard University's School of Public Health and Harvard Medical School. During her Masters, Olayiwola also served as an attending physician at Tufts University in Student Health Services.

In 2023–2024, she completed the Credential of Readiness (CORe) program at Harvard Business School.

== Career ==
In 2002, towards the beginning of her residency training, Olayiwola founded the non-profit corporation GIRLTALK (Girls In Real Life Tackling A Livid Killer). She became the chief executive officer of the corporation, a role she held until 2013, and helped organize a community-centered public health approach to provide education and training to minority adolescent females about the sexual health topics, HIV prevention, and the use of popular culture to reduce the risk of infection.

=== Early career ===
In 2005, Olayiwola was elected to the Governing Council of the American Public Health Association's HIV/AIDS section and became a member of the Minority Women's Health Panel of Experts of the Office on Women's Health of the U.S. Department of Health and Human Services. Olayiwola also started a position as a staff physician and primary care provider at the Community Health Center, Incorporated (CHCI) in Middletown, Connecticut, which is the largest federally qualified health center in Connecticut and provides community-based care to underserved patients.

She simultaneously taught and mentored medical students at the University of Connecticut School of Medicine. In 2007, Olayiwola was promoted to medical director of the Meriden Site of CHCI and she also became Vice President of Medical Staff. The following year, in 2008, she was promoted to Chief Medical Officer and President of Medical Staff of CHCI, where led CHCI to become one of the first organizations in the United States to receive both National Committee Quality Assurance Patient-Centered Medical Home (PCMH) Level 3 Assurance and Joint Commission PCMH accreditation. She was also the youngest CMO in the CHCI's existence. In 2012, she became the Director of the Institute for Community Health Policy at CHCI.

=== Career Progression ===
In 2013, Olayiwola was inducted into the American College of Physician Executives and was recruited to the University of California, San Francisco Department of Family and Community Medicine to become an assistant professor of Medicine and the associate director of the Center for Excellence in Primary Care. She also practiced primary care as a physician in the Zuckerberg San Francisco General Hospital. In 2014 she was a Marshall Memorial Fellow of the German Marshall Fund of the US.

Internationally, Olayiwola has led primary care and health system transformation efforts through her consultancy firm, Inspire Health Solutions, LLC, founded in 2014. She has advised ministries of health, NGOs, and academic institutions in Nigeria, Ireland, Australia, New Zealand, Singapore, the Netherlands, and the United Arab Emirates on implementing value-based care models, PCMH frameworks, and workforce capacity building.

From 2017 to 2019, She also served as the inaugural Chief Clinical Transformation Officer at RubiconMD, a health technology startup focused on electronic consultations (eConsults) to increase access to specialty care. She created the Clinical Transformation in Technology™ model and the Clinical Transformation University, helping train clinicians in technology integration for underserved populations.

In 2019, she was recruited as Professor and Chair of the Department of Family and Community Medicine at The Ohio State University College of Medicine and Wexner Medical Center, where she founded the Center for Primary Care Innovation and Transformation.

From 2021 to 2024, Olayiwola served as the inaugural Chief Health Equity Officer and Senior Vice President at Humana Inc. She developed the company’s enterprise-wide health equity strategy and directed $32 million in funding to community and academic partners. Her major initiatives included co-creating the Health Equity Innovation Hub at the University of Louisville and leading efforts in data disaggregation, predictive modeling, and creating a framework for understanding and addressing disparities in Medicare Advantage and Medicaid populations. She also led the implementation of the first national health plan screening for health literacy and perceived healthcare discrimination, coupled with screening for social determinants of health. She authored a critical guide for health plans to tackling inequities in health in an article in Health Affairs, and was also the lead investigator on a study in the American Journal of Managed Care.

In 2022, The White House Office of Public Engagement and Biden-Harris administration invited Olayiwola to participate in its non-partisan Clinician Innovators Roundtable with cross-sector clinicians from across the United States. Additionally, in September 2022, she was invited to be among a select group of 40 Ohio community, civic and elected leaders to visit and advise the White House as part of their Communities in Action Forum: Building a Better Ohio.

In 2024, she was appointed President of the Advocate National Center for Clinical & Community Impact (CCI) and Senior Vice President of Advocate Health.

Olayiwola continues a part time clinical practice at Health of Ohio Family Health Centers in Columbus, OH, where she serves as a physician in their refugee and immigrant clinic.

=== Board service ===
Olayiwola serves on the boards of the healthcare technology companies Get Well and Predicta Med, both focused on applications of artificial intelligence in health care. She is also a member of the Board of Directors of The Ohio State University Alumni Association, representing more than 630,000 alumni.

Her previous board memberships include the Robert Graham Center for Policy Studies in Family Medicine & Primary Care, The Ohio State University Alumni Advisory Council, Primary Care Progress, Health Insight/Qualis Health, the African Women’s Development Fund–USA, and We Care Solar.

== Community service and philanthropy ==
Olayiwola has been involved in a range of community-based and philanthropic initiatives focused on education, public health, and gender equity.

She founded GIRLTALK, Inc. in New York City, an organization centered on HIV/AIDS education, prevention, and youth empowerment for minority adolescent girls in New York and West Africa. She also established the Association of Minority Women Professionals, which hosted the Minority Women Professionals are MVPs development program and conference series across several U.S. cities, providing networking and mentoring opportunities for women in various professional fields.

In 2024, Olayiwola and her husband founded That Next Step Africa, a nonprofit that provides scholarships, mentorship, and support for girls in West Africa to continue their education. That same year, they and their children launched the PaNDiN Foundation in Ibadan, Nigeria, to support children and families through initiatives such as youth sports programs, orphanage partnerships, and community feeding efforts.

In November 2024, Olayiwola and members of her extended family established the Olayiwola & Onyejekwe Graduate and Professional Success Fund at The Ohio State University, aimed at supporting students from underrepresented backgrounds pursuing graduate or professional education.

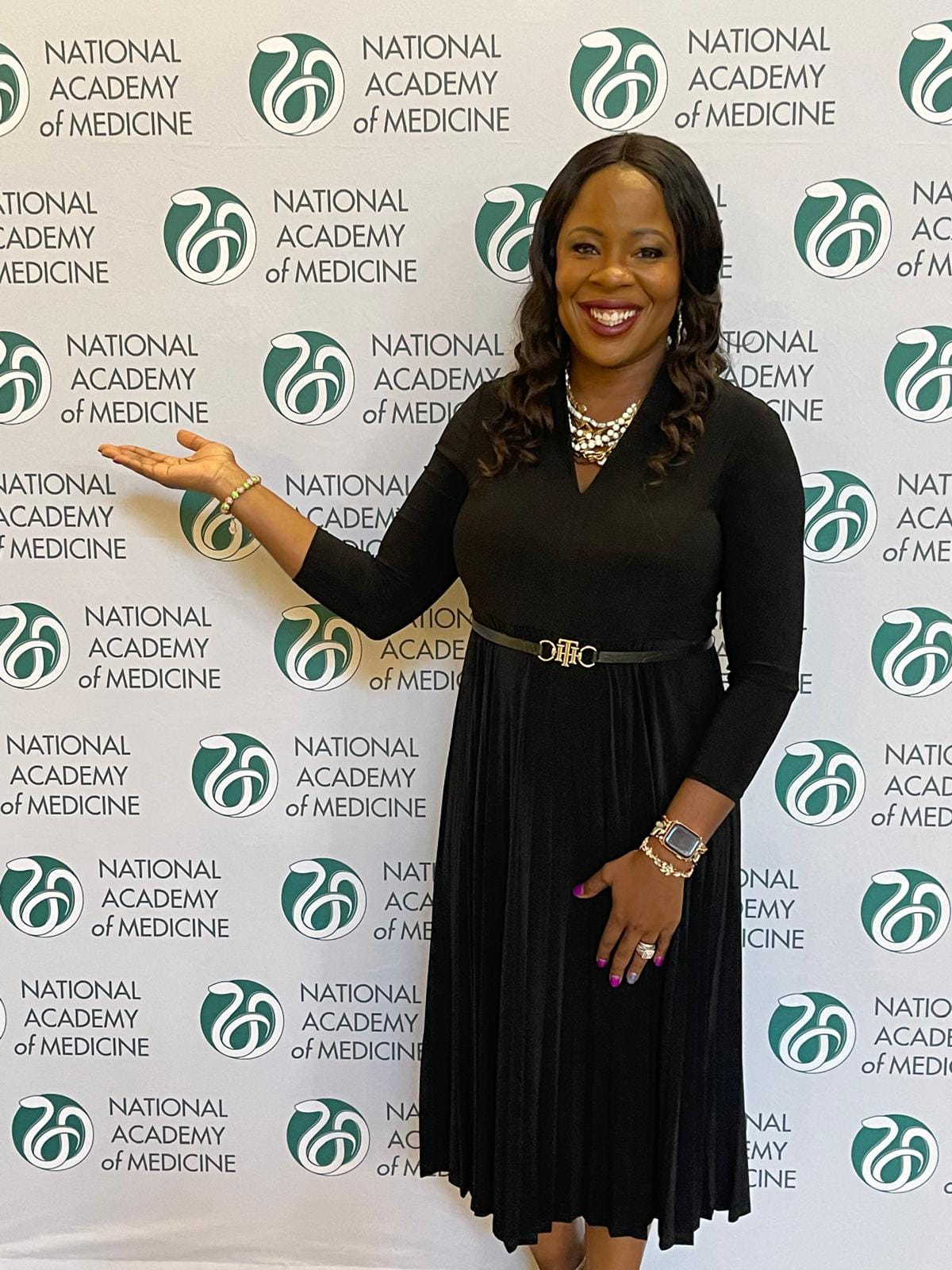
Olayiwola during her induction into the National Academy of Medicine in 2022

== Research and writing ==
Olayiwola’s scholarly work and research centers on primary care transformation, disparities in health, health information technology, and the social determinants of health. Her research is distinguished by its emphasis on underserved and marginalized populations, including immigrants, refugees, and low-income communities.

Olayiwola was the principal investigator of the first published study evaluating the impact of Patient-Centered Medical Homes (PCMHs) on health disparities. Her findings highlighted how the PCMH model improved access, coordination, and outcomes for historically underserved groups, contributing to national value-based care and accreditation strategies.

In 2011, as Chief Medical Officer at Community Health Center, Inc. (CHCI) in Connecticut, she led the state’s first telemedicine-based diabetic retinopathy screening program. Published in the Journal of Health Care for the Poor and Underserved, the study demonstrated improved early detection rates and access to vision care among diabetic patients in underserved populations.

During her time as Chief Health Equity Officer at Humana Inc., Olayiwola expanded into health equity analytics, predictive modeling, and data disaggregation.

In addition to her research contributions, Olayiwola is an accomplished writer and poet. Her published works include four books—Half Woman, Medicine is Not a Job, Minority Women Professionals (MWPs) are MVPs, and Papaya Head: The Life Cycles of a First-Generation Daughter. Her writings often focus on the experiences of women and the intersections of identity, medicine, and leadership.

== Awards and honors ==
- Public Health Champion, Harvard School of Public Health Alumni Association, February 2025
- Inducted into the Ohio State University Office of Diversity and Inclusion Hall of Fame, April 2024
- Inducted into National Academy of Medicine, October 2022
- She Powers Health Women’s Leadership Award by Teladoc, October 2021
- 8 Black Women to Watch in Corporate America, Essence Magazine Movers & Shakers, Sep/Oct 2021
- Fierce Healthcare Most Influential Minority Executives in Healthcare Award, April 2021
- Clotilde D. Bowen Women of Excellence Award, Ohio State University College of Medicine, January 2021
- Family Physicians Changing Our World, Family Medicine Education Consortium, October 2020
- Public Health Innovator Award, Harvard School of Public Health, October 2019
- Alumni Achievement Award, The Ohio State University College of Medicine, August 2019
- Woman of the Year, American Telemedicine Association, April 2019
- Finalist, Elizabeth Blackwell Award, American Medical Women’s Association, March 2019
- 2019 Harvard Public Health Innovator Award
- 2019 Ohio State University College of Medicine Alumni Achievement Award
- 2019 American Telemedicine Association Woman of the Year Award
- 2016 UCSF Chancellor Diversity Award
- 2014 Harvard School of Public Health Emerging Public Health Professional Award
- 2014 Marshall Memorial Fellowship
- 2014 Hellman Family Foundation Award
- 2014 UCSF Young Innovator Award
- 2012 Early Career Achievement Award Ohio State University College of Medicine Alumni Association
- 2011 Named in the 100 Buckeyes You Should Know Recognition - Ohio State University Alumni Association
- 2011 National Medical Association Top 40 Leaders Under 40 Award
- 2007-2018 America's Top Family Doctors, Consumers Research Council of America
- 2007 Fellow of the American Academy of Family Physicians
- 2005 Excellence in Medicine Leadership Award, American Medical Association
- 2004 Presidential Scholar, Harvard School of Public Health

== Select publications ==
=== Journals ===
- Olayiwola, J.N., Potapov, A., Gordon, A., Jurado, J., Magana, C., Knox, M. and Tuot, D., 2018. Electronic consultation impact from the primary care clinician perspective: Outcomes from a national sample. Journal of Telemedicine and Telecare, p. 1357633X18784416.
- Reines, C., Miller, L., Olayiwola, J.N., Li, C. and Schwartz, E. Can eConsults Save Medicaid? NEJM Catalyst. August 2018.
- Brown-Johnson, Cati G., Garrett K. Chan, Marcy Winget, Jonathan G. Shaw, Kendra Patton, Rumana Hussain, J. Nwando Olayiwola, Sang-ick Chang, and Megan Mahoney. "Primary Care 2.0: Design of a Transformational Team-Based Practice Model to Meet the Quadruple Aim." American Journal of Medical Quality. September 2018.
- Wu, D., L. Saint-Hilaire, A. Pineda, D. Hessler, G. W. Saba, R. Salazar, and JN Olayiwola (November 2018). "The Efficacy of an Anti-oppression Curriculum for Health Professionals." Family medicine. 51, no. 1 (2019): 22–30.
- De Marchis, E., Knox, M., Hessler, D., Willard-Grace, R., Olayiwola, J.N., Peterson, L.E., Grumbach, K. and Gottlieb, L.M. Physician Burnout and Higher Clinic Capacity to Address Patients' Social Needs. J Am Board Fam Med, 32 (1), Jan 2019. pp. 69–78.
- JN Olayiwola and C Magaña. Clinical Transformation in Technology: A Fresh Change Management Approach for Primary Care. Harvard Health Policy Review. Feb 2, 2019.
- Alina Kung, Telly Cheung, Margae Knox, Rachel Willard-Grace, Jodi Halpern, Nwando Olayiwola, Laura Gottlieb. Capacity to address social needs affects primary care clinician burnout. Accepted for publication Annals of Family Medicine (In press 2019).
- De Marchis, E.H., Doekhie, K., Willard-Grace, R. and Olayiwola, J.N., The Impact of the Patient-Centered Medical Home on Health Care Disparities: Exploring Stakeholder Perspectives on Current Standards and Future Directions. Population Health Management. June 2018.
