= Atrium Health Floyd =

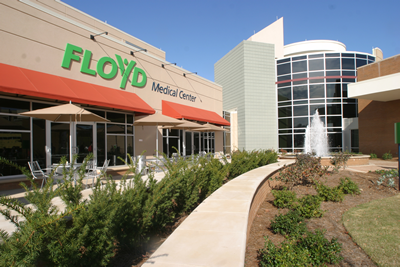

Geography
- Location: Rome, Georgia, United States
- Coordinates: 34°15′33″N 85°10′40″W

Organization
- Care system: Public
- Type: General

Services
- Emergency department: Level II trauma center
- Beds: 304

History
- Opened: 1942

Links
- Website: www.floyd.org
- Lists: Hospitals in Georgia

Atrium Health Floyd (formerly Floyd Hospital and Floyd Medical Center) is a system of health care providers serving Northwest Georgia and Northeast Alabama since 1942. Located in Rome, Georgia, it is Floyd County’s largest employer with over 3,400 employees. It is a part of the Atrium Health system.

== History ==
Led by Dr. W.H. Lewis, built by county labor and funded by the citizens of Floyd County, what was then called Floyd Hospital opened its doors on July 4, 1942. By 1977, the hospital was later renamed to Floyd Medical Center.

In July 2021, Charlotte-based healthcare system Atrium Health (the working entity of the Charlotte-Mecklenburg Hospital Authority) and Floyd finalized a strategic combination. In October 2021, the system was renamed Atrium Health Floyd.

== Floyd Medical Center ==
Floyd Medical Center is a 304-bed, full-service hospital located in Rome, Georgia. Serving as the main campus for Atrium Health Floyd, the hospital contains a certified Chest Pain Center, designated Bariatric Surgery Center of Excellence and Breast Imaging Center of Excellence. Floyd Medical Center is also home to a state-designated Level II Trauma Center, a behavioral health center, specialty centers for pediatrics, wound care, and hyperbaric therapy. It houses primary care and urgent care networks of providers and hosts a realm of outpatient services, including the operation of the Floyd County Clinic and an associated pharmacy for uninsured patients.

Floyd and its affiliates are operated by Floyd Healthcare Management Inc. The Floyd family of health care services provides a full spectrum of health care services from prenatal childbirth classes to grief support groups through Heyman Hospice Care at Floyd. The babies born at Floyd each year are cared for at the area's Level III Neonatal Intensive Care Unit (NICU).

Floyd Medical Center is a Primary Stroke Center recognized by The Joint Commission with its gold seal of approval indicating Floyd has the critical elements to achieve long-term success in improving outcomes of stroke. Floyd is one of only a few hospitals in Georgia to be recognized as a Primary Stroke Center.

Floyd's Surgical Services Team was the first in Georgia to perform the Birmingham hip resurfacing procedure.

== Additional facilities ==
Floyd Cherokee Medical Center is a not-for-profit 60-bed hospital in Centre, Alabama, and provides emergency care, imaging, drug and alcohol treatment, lab work, a pharmacy, respiratory care and surgical services.

Polk Medical Center in Cedartown, Georgia, is a 25-bed, critical access hospital. It provides a Level IV Trauma Center, inpatient rehabilitation, imaging, lab work and infusion therapy.

Floyd Behavioral Health Center is a freestanding 53-bed behavioral health facility, in Rome, Georgia, that provides outpatient and inpatient treatment for adults in need of mental health and substance abuse support.
