= Carolinas College of Health Sciences =

Public college in Charlotte, North Carolina, US

Coordinates: 35.2002°N 80.8384°W

Carolinas College of Health Sciences is a non-profit public college focused on the health sciences and is located both online and with a physical campus in Charlotte, North Carolina.

== History ==
The college's roots date back to the 1940s, when Charlotte Memorial Hospital, now Atrium Health Carolinas Medical Center (CMC), provided hospital-based nursing and allied health training, forming the roots of Carolinas College. The college is owned by Atrium Health. It offers on-campus and online certificates, associate degrees & bachelor's degrees. The college focuses on educating, engaging and empowering professionals for an evolving healthcare environment. Graduates consistently exceed state and national certification testing benchmarks. The college's current president is Dr. T. Hampton Hopkins.

== Academics ==
Carolinas College of Health Sciences offers educational programs leading to entry-level employment in health care careers as well as programs for health care professionals to advance in their current roles. The college offers programs in nursing, general studies, health care simulation, clinical laboratory sciences, and diagnostic and imaging sciences such as radiologic technology. Some programs may be completed entirely online, while others are offered at the college's Charlotte campus. The college is accredited by the Commission on Colleges of the Southern Association of Colleges and Schools to award the Associate of Applied Science degree and the Baccalaureate degree. Individual programs may also have additional accreditations.

Undergraduate demographics as of Fall 2023
Race and ethnicity	Total
White	46%
Unknown	20%
Black	19%
Hispanic	8%
Asian	3%
Two or more races	3%
Native Hawaiian/Pacific Islander	1%
Economic diversity
Low-income (Note: The percentage of students who received an income-based federal Pell grant intended for low-income students.)	19%
Affluent (Note: The percentage of students who are a part of the American middle class at the bare minimum.)	81%
