= Levine Children's Hospital =

- Atrium Health

Geography
- Location: Charlotte, North Carolina, United States
- Coordinates: 35.203618°N 80.838600°W

Organization
- Type: Specialist
- Affiliated university: Wake Forest School of Medicine

Services
- Emergency department: Level I (ACS Verified)
- Beds: 247 (Licensed Beds)
- Speciality: Pediatrics

Helipads
- Helipad: ICAO: 34NC
Number	Length		Surface
Number	ft	m	Surface
1			concrete
2			concrete
3			concrete

History
- Founded: 2007

Links
- Website: www.levinechildrenshospital.org
- Lists: Hospitals in North Carolina

Levine Children's Hospital, formally known as Atrium Health Levine Children's Hospital, is a 247-bed pediatric hospital located on the campus of Carolinas Medical Center in Charlotte, North Carolina. Operated by Atrium Health, the hospital opened its doors in October 2007 and operates a Level 1 Pediatric Trauma Center. It is named after Leon Levine. The hospital has a 24 bed Pediatric ICU and 20 bed Pediatric Cardiovascular ICU that can serve up to 4 open heart surgeries a day. Levine Children's Hospital has its own emergency department that can handle simple bumps and bruises to asthma attacks to pediatric traumas.

== Rankings ==
Levine Children's is ranked in numerous areas by US News & World Report

2023-2024 U.S. News & World Report Levine Children's
Specialty	Rank (In the U.S.)	Score (Out of 100)
Pediatric Cancer	#31	72.7
Pediatric Cardiology and Heart Surgery	#8	83.8
Pediatric Gastroenterology & GI Surgery	#22	81
Pediatric Nephrology	#27	78.5
Pediatric Orthopedics	#19	73.2
Pediatric Pulmonology & Lung Surgery	#27	75.4
Pediatric Urology	#32	73.6
