= McGill Rose Garden =

Public garden in Charlotte, NC

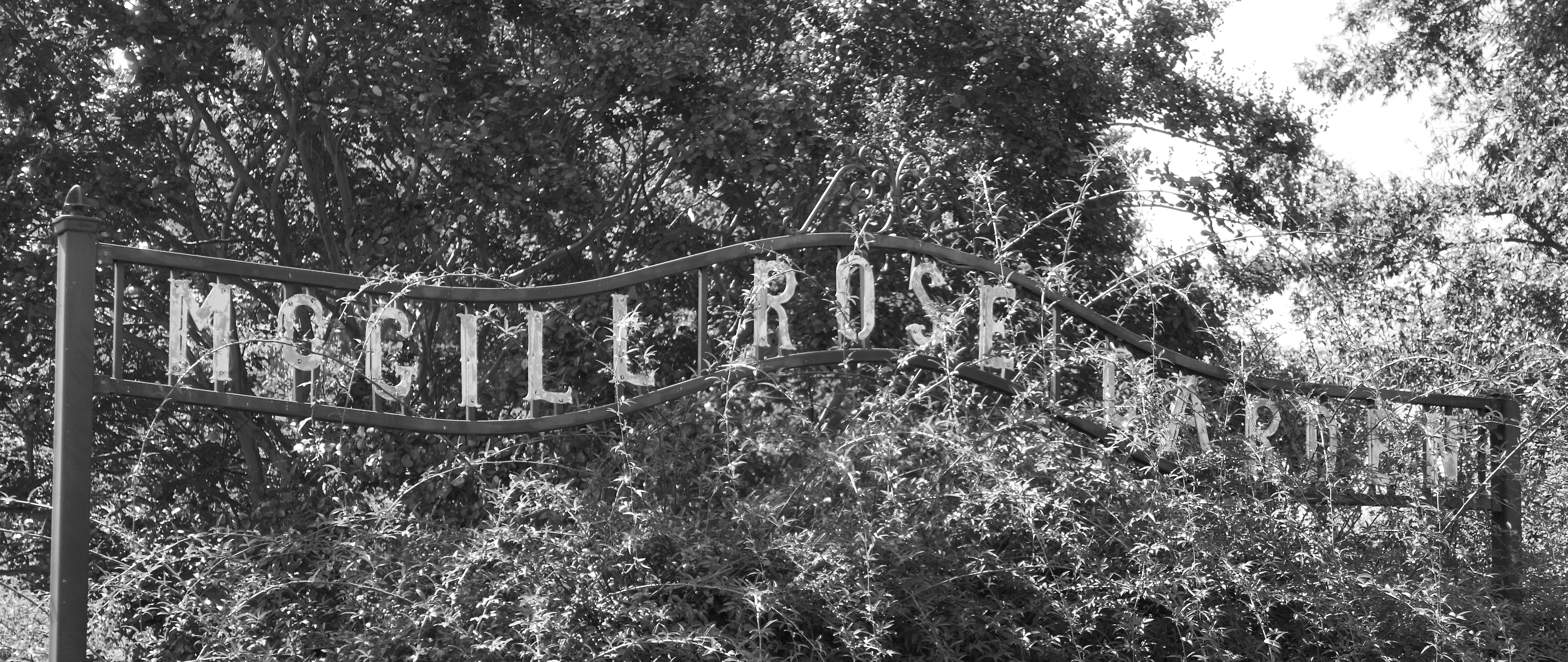
- McGill Rose Garden Sign visible from the parking lot
- Interactive map of McGill Rose Garden
- Type: Public garden
- Location: Charlotte, North Carolina
- Coordinates: 35.2298°N 80.8273°W
- Area: 1.4 acres (0.57 ha)
- Created: 1967
- Operator: City of Charlotte
- Website: McGill Rose Garden

McGill Rose Garden is a city supported park at 940 North Davidson Street in the Belmont neighborhood of Charlotte, North Carolina. It has been designated an All-America Rose Selections (AARS) public garden, one of only 4 such gardens in all of North Carolina and one of only 53 in the entire United States. It is the only park in Charlotte owned and managed by the city—all other parks in Charlotte are under the jurisdiction of Mecklenburg County.

== History of the garden ==
The plot of land on which the garden sits was once a coal and ice yard. It was bought in 1950 by Henry McGill, one of the leading philanthropists in Charlotte. His wife Helen began planting roses to soften the grim heritage of the coal yard and, little by little, she transformed the former industrial site into a beautiful garden. Starting in 1967 the garden was opened to the public on every Mother's Day. Eventually there were so many roses that Helen became known as the rose lady. When she died in 1985, her husband Henry took over the development and maintenance of the garden in her memory.

On May 10, 1976, with the help of a federal grant which enabled Charlotte to acquire "green space", at the recommendation of Councilman Harvey Gantt, and with the approval by Mayor John M. Belk, the City purchased the property from Henry McGill. In 1995, an independent Board of Directors was formed for the garden, being recognized as a 501(c)(3) tax-exempt organization. In 1996, the McGill Board entered into a lease with the City of Charlotte to manage the garden, and continues to do so.

Henry McGill worked every day in his beloved garden through age 99, and then at least weekly until his death in 2007 at the age of 103. The park is partly supported by a grant from the Charlotte-Mecklenburg Arts & Sciences Council (ACS)

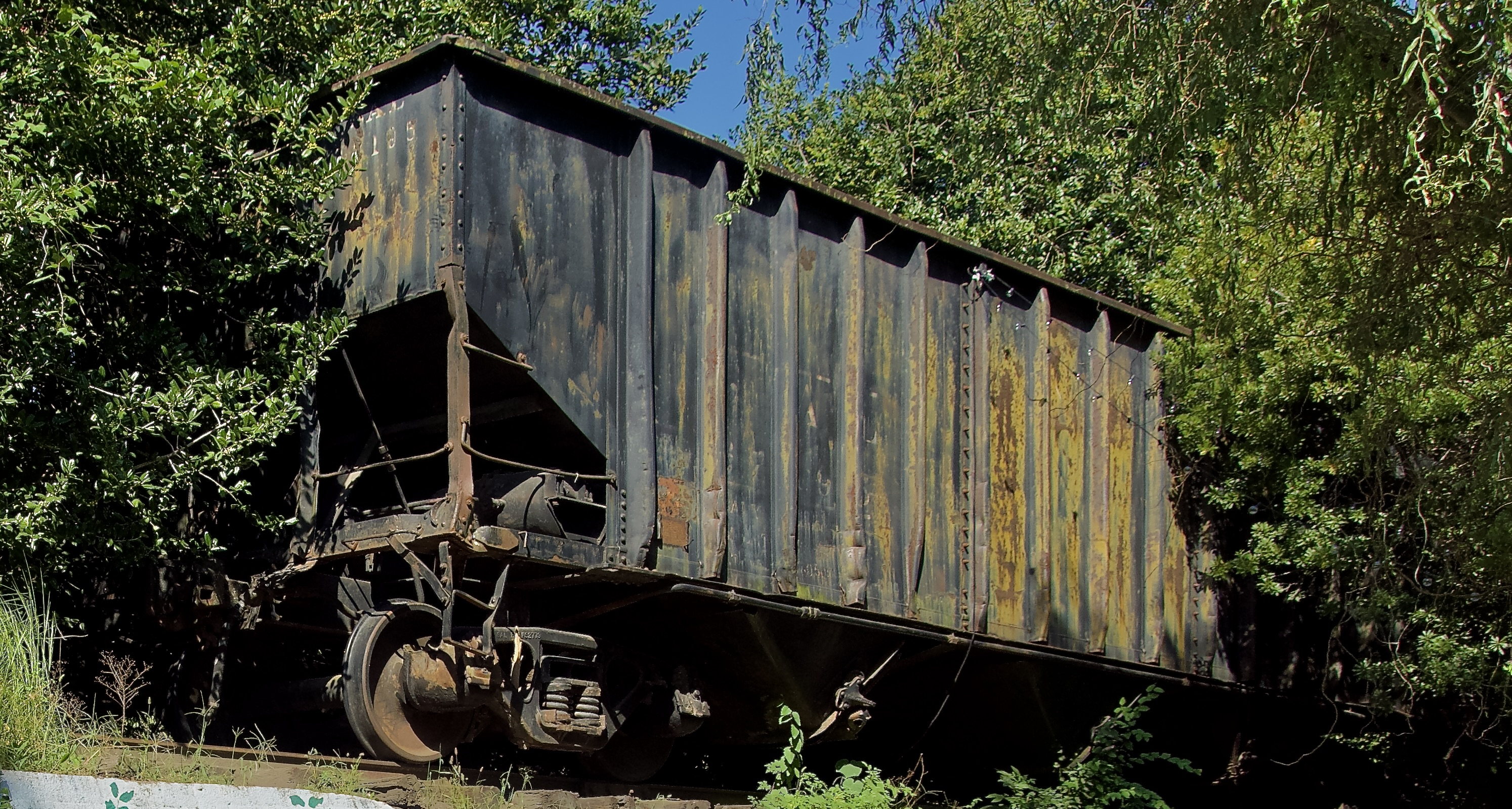
Coal car and mural in McGill Rose Garden

Today the park covers one and a third acres of meandering paths, fountains, benches, sculptures by Charlotte artist Tom Risser, and over a thousand rose bushes in over two hundred varieties, as well as many annuals, perennials, and herbs. In an echo of the past, a full sized coal car sits discreetly in one shady corner of the garden, partly hidden by foliage, on a surviving piece of railroad track. The park is open to the public most days of the year and charges no admission.
