= Monroe Crossing =

Monroe Crossing Mall
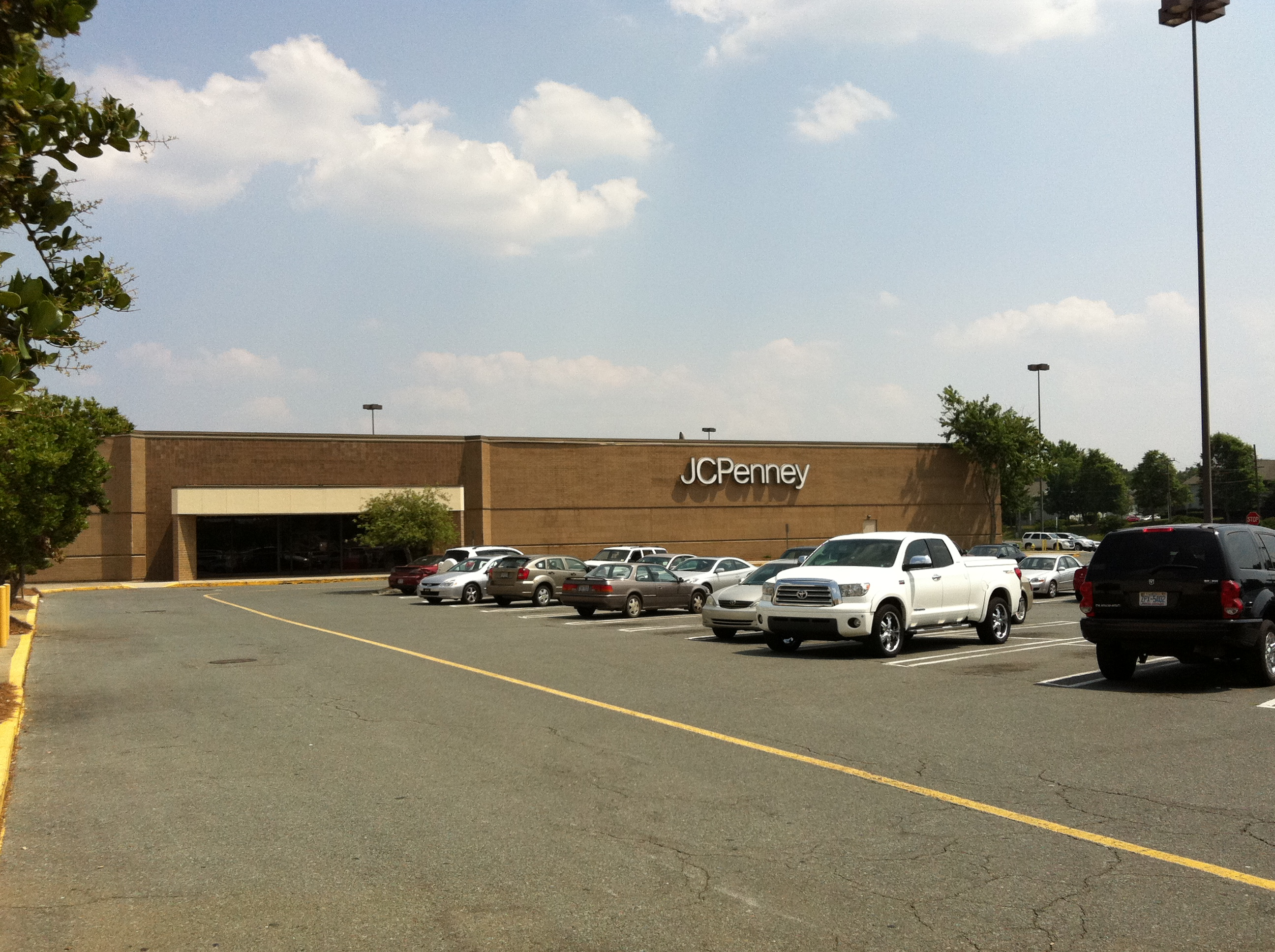
- JCPenney at Monroe Crossing, June 2011
- Location: Monroe, North Carolina, United States
- Coordinates: 35.00453°N 80.55974°W
- Address: 2115 West Roosevelt Boulevard #290
- Opened: 1979
- Manager: Urban Retail
- Owner: Time Equities Inc.
- Num. of stores: 45+
- Num. of anchor tenants: 3 (2 open, 1 vacant)
- Floor area: 395,000 square feet (36,700 m^{2})(GLA)
- Floors: 1
- Website: shopmonroecrossing.com

Monroe Crossing Mall (Monroe Crossing) is a 395,000 square feet (37,000 m^{2}) regional mall located in Monroe, Union County, North Carolina, United States. The mall houses a mix of local and national retailers and anchor stores.

Monroe Crossing is on West Roosevelt Boulevard, in front of US Route 74, which is the primary route to Charlotte and carries more than 54,000 cars per day. Monroe Crossing is anchored by Belk and Roses. Other tenants include Bath & Body Works, Chick-fil-A, Red Bowl Asian Bistro and Vanric Games

Monroe Crossing Mall runs a club called “Just KID-ding Around”, which hosts monthly themed events for children. Monroe Crossing often partners with local charities.

== History ==
This property was originally built in 1979, and was known as Monroe Mall. The mall was renovated in 2001, and then was acquired by Madison Marquette in December 2005. Since acquiring Monroe Crossing, Madison Marquette has improved the mall aesthetically and with more aggressive leasing practices. Monroe Crossing was renovated again in 2009; some of the improvements included: new floors, signage, tenants, furniture and seating areas. In December 2014, Madison Marquette successfully sold Monroe Crossing to Time Equities, Inc, a real estate investment firm based in New York.

Its largest anchor department store, Belk, expanded its location at Monroe Crossing from 65,000 square feet to 95,000 square feet in March 2008 in a $5.8 million expansion. Belk's brand offerings increased with the expansion to include brands such as Michael Kors, Karen Kane, and Ralph Lauren.

Sears closed in June 2017, and JCPenney closed on July 31, 2017. In August 2018, Roses opened in the former JCPenney.

== Anchor stores ==
The mall's anchor stores are:

- Belk
- Roses
