= Carolinas Medical Center =

- Atrium Health
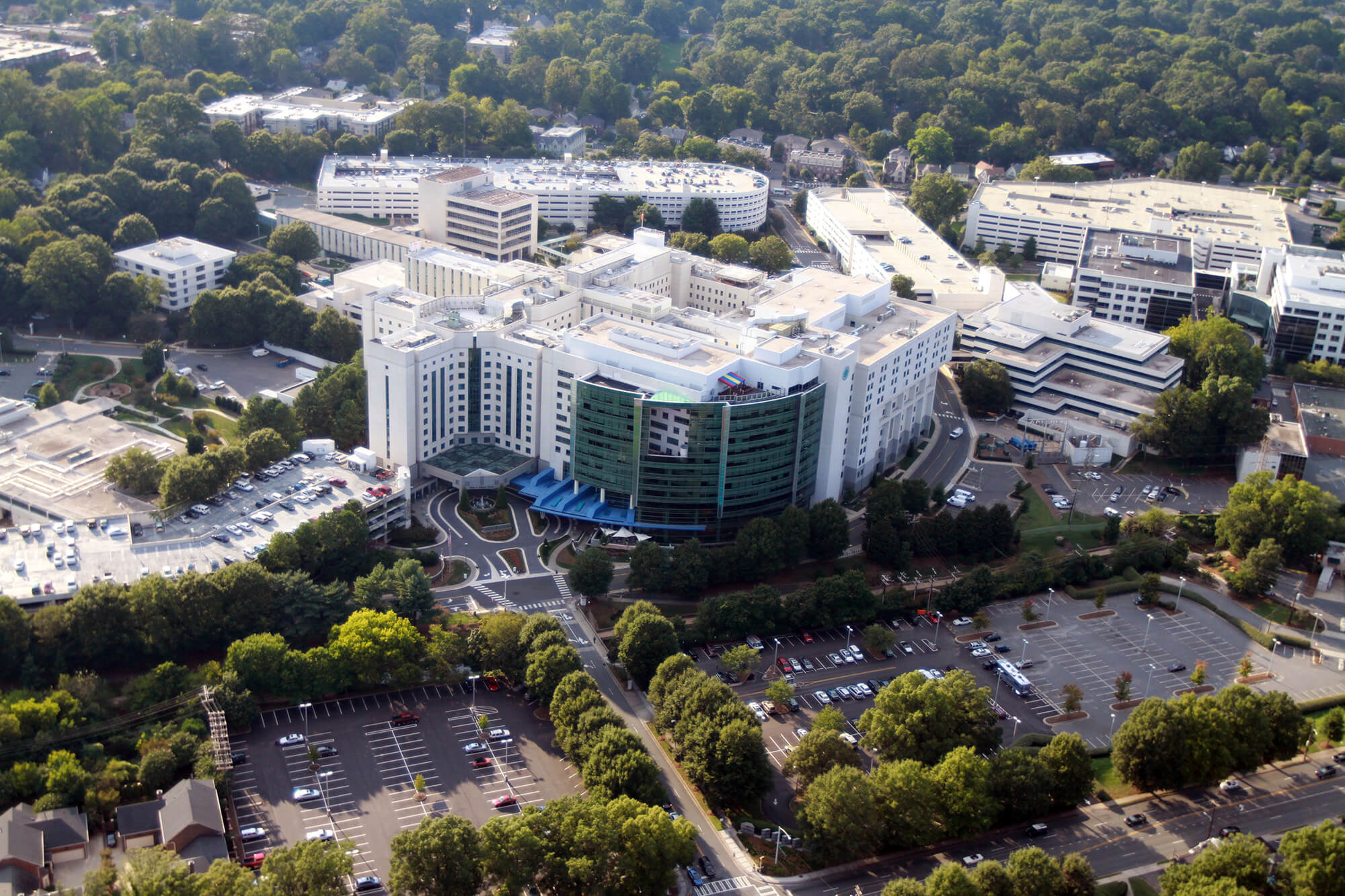
- Aerial photo of Carolinas Medical Center in 2012

Geography
- Location: 1000 Blythe Blvd, Charlotte, North Carolina, United States
- Coordinates: 35.2040°N 80.8391°W

Organization
- Care system: Public, Medicaid, Medicare
- Type: General and specialized
- Affiliated university: Wake Forest University School of Medicine
- Network: Atrium Health

Services
- Emergency department: Level I trauma center
- Beds: 874

Helipads
- Helipad: FAA LID: 34NC

History
- Founded: 1940

Links
- Website: https://atriumhealth.org/locations/detail/carolinas-medical-center
- Lists: Hospitals in North Carolina

Carolinas Medical Center, formally known as Atrium Health Carolinas Medical Center, is an 874-bed non-profit, tertiary, research and academic medical center located in Charlotte, North Carolina, servicing the southern North Carolina, northern South Carolina, and the Metrolina region. Carolinas Medical Center is one of the region's only academic university-level teaching centers. The hospital is the flagship hospital of Atrium Health. Carolinas Medical Center is affiliated with the Wake Forest School of Medicine. Carolinas Medical Center is also an ACS designated level I trauma center and has a heliport to handle medevac patients. Attached to the medical center is the Levine Children's Hospital, treating infants, children, adolescents, and young adults.

== History ==
The hospital was organized in 1940 as Charlotte Memorial Hospital on Blythe Boulevard in the Dilworth neighborhood. Since that time, the hospital has undergone several major expansions, bringing the licensed bed capacity to 874 beds.

In May 1970, the organ Transplant program began with the first cadaveric kidney transplant performed by Dr. Don Mullen and Dr. Dale Ensor. This was one of the first transplants in the USA done outside a medical school setting. A year later, Mullen and Ensor performed the first living related transplant.

Dr. Francis Robicsek performed the first heart transplant at Carolinas Medical Center in 1986.

In 2007, the multistory Levine Children's Hospital was completed and opened, making it the second largest children's hospital in the Southeastern United States, after Washington, D.C.

In 2010, the University of North Carolina School of Medicine established the Charlotte Campus of the UNC School of Medicine at Carolinas Medical Center. Students from UNC School of Medicine had been completing clinical rotations at Carolinas Medical Center for over 40 years prior.

On July 28, 2011, Becker's Hospital Review listed Carolinas Medical Center under 60 Hospitals with Great Orthopedic Programs.

In October 2020, Wake Forest School of Medicine and Atrium Health began an agreement to make Carolinas Medical Center one of its flagship teaching hospitals along with the creation of a Charlotte campus of its medical school.

In July 2023, Carolinas Medical Center broke ground on a nearly $900 million, 1.1 million square foot expansion that includes an emergency center and 484 new patient rooms, 38 operating rooms, and 16 procedure rooms to be completed in 2027.

Today, Carolinas Medical Center is the region's only Level 1 Trauma Center and part of Atrium Health, one of the largest public not-for-profit healthcare systems in the United States.
