= Atrium Health Mercy =

Coordinates: 35.209986°N 80.8208235°W

- Atrium Health

Geography
- Location: Charlotte, North Carolina, United States

Organization
- Care system: Private, Medicaid, Medicare
- Type: General and specialized

Services
- Emergency department: Yes
- Beds: 185

History
- Opened: 1906

Links
- Website: https://atriumhealth.org/locations/detail/atrium-health-mercy
- Lists: Hospitals in North Carolina

Atrium Health Mercy (formerly Mercy Hospital, later Carolinas Medical Center-Mercy) is a 185-bed adult health tertiary acute care facility located in the Elizabeth neighborhood of Charlotte, North Carolina. The hospital was established in 1906 by the Sisters of Mercy, and is the first Catholic hospital ever built in North Carolina. In 1995, the Sisters of Mercy sold the hospital to Carolinas Healthcare System, now Atrium Health. The hospital is also home to several specialty departments, including Pulmonary and Pain Management facilities. It is a facility of Atrium Health, one of the nation's largest publicly owned, not-for-profit hospital operators.

== Mercy School of Nursing ==
Between 1908 and 2016 the hospital operated the Mercy School of Nursing. Originally a three-year diploma program the school shifted to a two-year program in 1993. Mercy began admitting male students in 1966. In 2016 the decision was made to effectively fold the Mercy School of Nursing into the more comprehensive Carolinas College of Health Sciences.
