= Atrium Health Pineville =

Carolinas HealthCare System Pineville
- Atrium Health

Geography
- Location: Pineville, North Carolina, United States
- Coordinates: 35.0918°N 80.8716°W

Organization
- Care system: Private, Medicaid, Medicare
- Type: General and specialized

Services
- Emergency department: Yes
- Beds: 235

History
- Opened: 1987

Links
- Website: https://atriumhealth.org/locations/detail/atrium-health-pineville
- Lists: Hospitals in North Carolina

Atrium Health Pineville (Formerly Mercy Hospital South, later Carolinas Medical Center-Pineville) is a 235 bed acute care facility located in Pineville, North Carolina. The hospital was opened in 1987 by the Sisters of Mercy to serve the rapidly growing southern part of Mecklenburg County. in 1995, the Sisters of Mercy sold the hospital to Carolinas HealthCare System, now Atrium Health. Atrium Health Pineville is a facility of Atrium Health, one of the nation's largest publicly owned, not-for-profit hospital operators.
