= Atrium Health =

Hospital network

Charlotte-Mecklenburg Hospital Authority

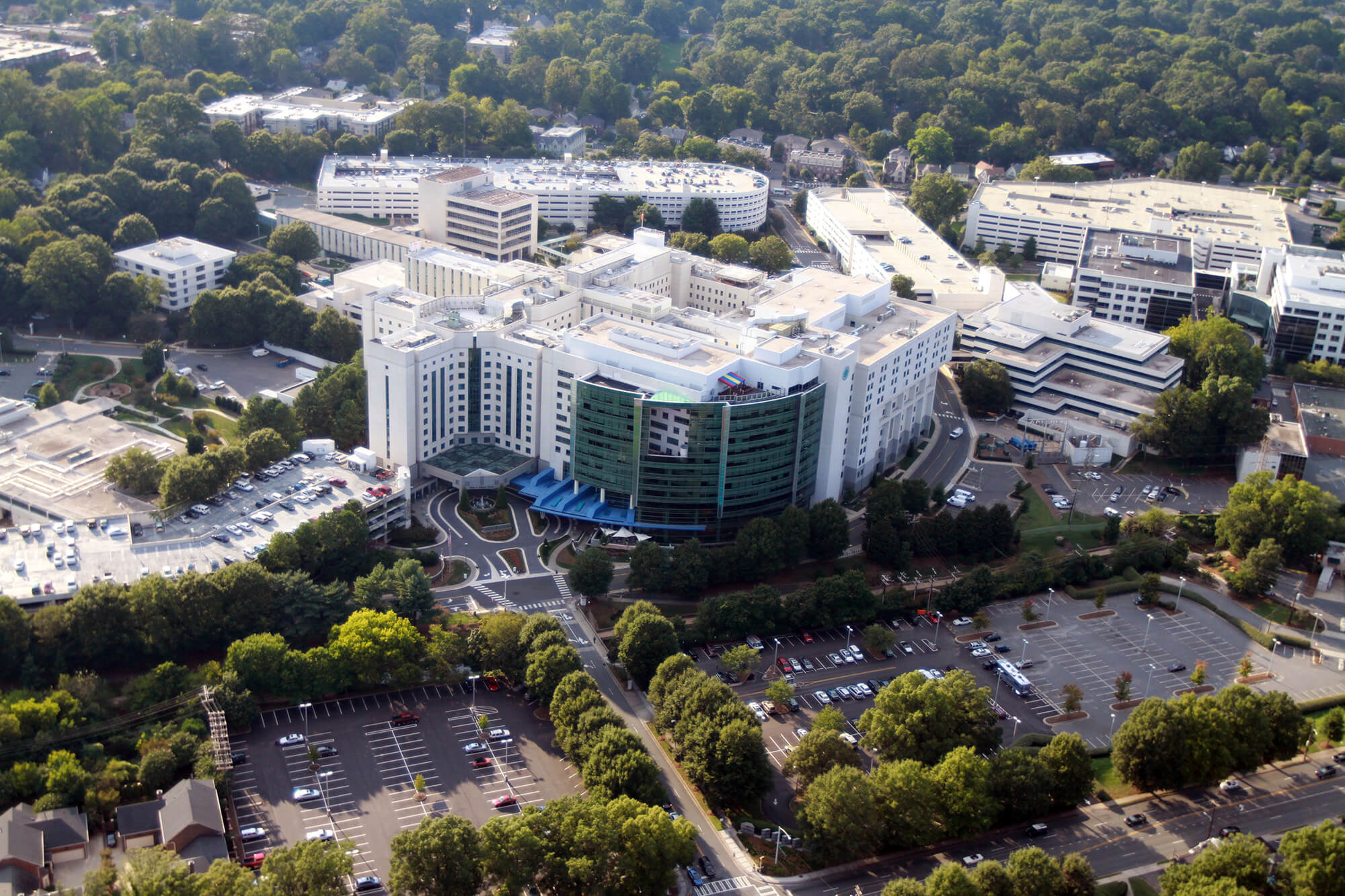
- Aerial view of Carolinas Medical Center, Atrium Health’s flagship hospital and corporate headquarters
- Trade name: Atrium Health
- Formerly: Carolinas HealthCare System Charlotte Memorial Hospital
- Type: North Carolina Hospital Authority
- Industry: Health care
- Founded: October 7, 1940; 86 years ago in Charlotte, North Carolina, United States
- Headquarters: 1000 Blythe Boulevard, Charlotte, North Carolina, United States
- Number of locations: 1,400 care locations; 40 hospitals; 35 emergency departments; 32 cancer care locations; 3,350+ providers; 15,000+ nurses; 35 urgent care locations; (2021)
- Area served: North Carolina, South Carolina, Georgia, and Alabama
- Key people: Eugene A. Woods (CEO), April 2016-December 2, 2022
- Services: Health care; Community service
- Revenue: $9.9 billion net operating revenue; $5.8 million uncompensated care; (2019)
- Number of employees: ~70,000 (2021)
- Parent: Advocate Health
- Divisions: Levine Cancer Institute; Sanger Heart & Vascular Institute; Levine Children's Hospital; Neurosciences Institute
- Website: www.atriumhealth.org

Charlotte-Mecklenburg Hospital Authority (doing business as Atrium Health, and formerly doing business as Carolinas HealthCare System) is an American hospital network in the southern United States. The parent corporation, also named Atrium Health, merged with Advocate Aurora Health creating Advocate Health in December 2022. It operates 40 hospitals, 9 freestanding emergency departments, over 30 urgent care centers, and more than 1,400 care locations in the American states of North Carolina, South Carolina, Georgia, and Alabama. It provides care under the Atrium Health Wake Forest Baptist name in the Winston-Salem, North Carolina, region, Atrium Health Navicent in the Macon, Georgia area, and Atrium Health Floyd in the Rome, Georgia area. Atrium Health offers pediatric, cancer, and heart care, as well as organ transplants, burn treatments and specialized musculoskeletal programs.

The Charlotte-Mecklenburg Hospital Authority is a municipal hospital authority established under North Carolina's Hospital Authorities Act (North Carolina General Statutes chapter 131E, part 2). The authority is governed by a self-perpetuating board of commissioners which nominates new commissioners to fill its own vacancies; the chair of the Mecklenburg Board of County Commissioners can approve or veto those nominations but not make nominations of their own.

== History ==
- In 1876, Jane Wilkes leads the effort to establish St. Peter's Episcopal Hospital, originally called Charlotte Home and Hospital, in Charlotte's Fourth Ward.
- Charlotte Memorial Hospital opens in 1940, replacing St. Peter's Hospital, whose remaining patients are transferred to Charlotte Memorial on October 7.
- In 1943, Charlotte Memorial Hospital takes on a new legal status, known officially as the Charlotte Memorial Hospital Authority. This name was changed in 1961 to Charlotte Mecklenburg Hospital Authority.
- Charlotte Memorial Hospital Authority assumes ownership and management of Good Samaritan Hospital, the city's only hospital providing non-emergency care to racial minority patients.
- Charlotte Memorial Hospital adopts the first graphic version of its now-familiar "Tree of Life" logo in 1982.
- Charlotte Memorial Hospital changes its name to Carolinas Medical Center (CMC) in 1990, and CMC is designated as one of North Carolina's five Academic Medical Center Teaching Hospitals.
- The Charlotte Mecklenburg Hospital Authority begins using the name "Carolinas Healthcare System" in 1996.
- In 2019, CMC underwent the system-wide rebrand and is now Atrium Health's Carolinas Medical Center.
- In 2020, Atrium Health and Wake Forest Baptist Health merged.
- In July 2021 Floyd Health of Rome, Georgia agreed to become a part of the Atrium system, as Atrium Health Floyd.
- Atrium agreed in May 2022 to merge its system with Advocate Aurora Health, assuming the Advocate brand, but based at Atrium's headquarters. This merger was completed on December 2, 2022.

== COVID-19 response ==
- Atrium Health's Levine Children's Hospital is one of 30 sites across the world – and the only children's hospital in North Carolina – selected to open a clinical trial to test the efficacy of remdesivir in pediatric patients who test positive for COVID-19.
- Atrium Health developed a new vaccine research program, “STRIVE for Healthier Futures,” with a goal of identifying a vaccine that safely and effectively prevents the spread of COVID-19. The STRIVE program, which stands for strategic research, innovation, vaccines, and engagement, consists of a "diverse, multi-disciplinary team of researchers, scientists, physicians, and other medical experts within the Atrium Health enterprise."

== Hospitals & facilities ==
Atrium Health is based in Charlotte. Carolinas Medical Center is the flagship hospital for the entire system (located between Dilworth and Myers Park). Atrium Health operates seven freestanding Emergency Departments, these are 24-hour emergency care centers for the treatment of emergency medical conditions, but are not attached to a full service hospital. Atrium Health also operates 37 urgent care centers across the system's Charlotte NC market.

The following is a list of Atrium Health hospitals:

| Hospital | City | County | State | Staffed beds | Notes |
|---|---|---|---|---|---|
| Atrium Health Anson | Wadesboro | Anson | NC | 15 | |
| Atrium Health Cabarrus | Concord | Cabarrus | NC | 457 | |
| Carolinas Medical Center | Charlotte | Mecklenburg | NC | 1287 | |
| Atrium Health Cleveland | Shelby | Cleveland | NC | 308 | |
| Atrium Health Kings Mountain | Kings Mountain | Cleveland | NC | 62 | |
| Atrium Health Lake Norman | Cornelius | Mecklenburg | NC | 36 | |
| Atrium Health Lincoln | Lincolnton | Lincoln | NC | 101 | |
| Atrium Health Mercy | Charlotte | Mecklenburg | NC | 185 | |
| Atrium Health Pineville | Pineville | Mecklenburg | NC | 394 | |
| Atrium Health Stanly | Albemarle | Stanly | NC | 109 | |
| Atrium Health Union | Monroe | Union | NC | 183 | |
| Atrium Health Union West | Stallings | Union | NC | 40 | Opened February 23, 2022 |
| Atrium Health University City | Charlotte | Mecklenburg | NC | 104 | |
| Atrium Health Wake Forest Baptist | Winston-Salem | Forsyth | NC | 872 | |
| Atrium Health Floyd | Rome | Floyd | GA | 329 | |
| Brenner Children's Hospital | Winston-Salem | Forsyth | NC | 155 | |
| The Medical Center, Navicent Health | Macon | Bibb | GA | 656 | |
| Atrium Health Navicent Health Baldwin | Milledgeville | Baldwin | GA | 101 | |

== Medical education & research ==
- Wake Forest School of Medicine (The “academic core” of Atrium Health. The main campus is located in Winston-Salem, NC, and a second location is expected to be built in Charlotte, NC in a medical innovation district called The Pearl.)
- Cabarrus College of Health Sciences (An education facility located on NE campus in Concord, NC)
- James G. Cannon Research Center (A research facility located on Atrium Health's Carolinas Medical Center campus in the Dilworth neighborhood)
- Carolinas College of Health Sciences (An education facility formerly on Atrium Health's Carolinas Medical Center campus in the Dilworth neighborhood)

== Other facilities ==
In addition to providing patients with quality health care, Atrium Health operates long-term care facilities in the Charlotte Area. Other facilities of importance include:

- Carolinas Physician Network (Network of Physician Offices in North and South Carolina)
- Mercy School of Nursing (Closed May 30, 2016) replaced by Carolinas College of Health Sciences and Cabarrus College of Health Sciences.
- Sanger Heart & Vascular Institute is a cardiovascular practice in Charlotte, North Carolina. It is the region's only clinic to offer minimally invasive heart bypass option and heart transplant center. Sanger includes more than 175 providers and 20 care centers across the Carolinas. Founded in 1956 by Paul Sanger and Dr. Francis Robicsek,

== Mergers ==
=== Navicent Health ===
On February 8, 2018, Atrium Health and Navicent Health of Macon, Georgia announced a partnership.

On December 19, 2018, leaders from Atrium Health and Navicent Health signed the definitive agreement that commits to the organizations’ strategic combination. The agreement was effective January 1, 2019, making Navicent Health the central and south Georgia hub for the Atrium Health network.

On January 29, 2021, the system was renamed Atrium Health Navicent.

=== Floyd Health System ===
On November 5, 2019, Atrium Health and Floyd Health System (Floyd) announced that the organizations signed a letter of intent to combine. The agreement was finalized on July 14, 2021. "Atrium Health has pledged to invest $650 million in capital" into Floyd Health System over the next 10 years.

On October 28, 2021, the system was renamed Atrium Health Floyd.

=== Wake Forest Baptist Health ===
On October 9, 2020, Atrium Health and Wake Forest Baptist Health, including Wake Forest School of Medicine, officially joined as a single enterprise, Atrium Health. The new enterprise became effective immediately.

The strategic combination was first announced in April 2019, with a definitive agreement signed in October 2019, following approval by each entity's governing board.

On October 23, 2020, Atrium Health announced $3.4 billion in planned investments for Wake Forest Baptist Health and the communities it serves over the next 10 years. Atrium Health will invest approximately $2.8 billion to improve facilities and fund critical investments.

On August 18, 2021, the system was renamed Atrium Health Wake Forest Baptist.

=== Advocate Aurora ===
The merger was first announced in May 2022. Advocate Aurora operates in Illinois and Wisconsin. The combined company will operate in six states: Illinois, Wisconsin, North Carolina, South Carolina, Georgia and Alabama. It will have 67 hospitals and 150,000 employees with $27 billion in annual revenue. It will be the fifth largest hospital system in the country. The combined organization would be called Advocate Health and be headquartered in Charlotte, North Carolina. Initially both Gene Woods, CEO of Atrium, and Jim Skogsbergh, CEO of Advocate Aurora will be co-CEOs for a year and a half until Skogsbergh retires; then Woods will be the sole CEO.

The deal will not affect Atrium's new medical school Wake Forest School of Medicine and the medical innovation district The Pearl. The medical school will be the academic core of the newly combined company. Currently Advocate does have partnerships with nearby medical schools and supports research. However, they do not have their own medical school or innovation district. Dr Julie Ann Freischlag, CEO of AHWFB, chief academic officer of Atrium Health and dean of the WFU School of Medicine said this about the merger's impact on the medical school “We’re really excited that the way this is set up. We’ll be a part of a bigger group, so I think if anything, people will know more who we are, and we’ll be able to touch more people and tell them about the research and education — the wonderful things we do.” Freischlag stated completing clinical trials and finding new treatment approaches will be easier with a larger patient population.

The deal faced a number of approval hurdles. The North Carolina Attorney General stated he would not oppose the deal, the Federal Trade Commission reviewed the merger, the deal was subject to Illinois and Wisconsin approval since Advocate Aurora is based in both states. The deal was temporarily blocked by Illinois health board and then decided to postpone the vote. During a special meeting on November 14, 2022, the board voted 6–0 to approve the deal. The merger was completed on December 2, 2022, making Atrium Health a subsidiary of Advocate Health.

== Controversies and lawsuits ==
- On June 9, 2016, it was reported that the U.S. Justice Department and the N.C. Attorney General's office filed a federal antitrust lawsuit against Carolinas HealthCare System, alleging the chain illegally reduces competition in the local health care market. Atrium Health settled the lawsuit with the Antitrust Division of the U.S. Department of Justice on November 15, 2018. The settlement included injunctive terms restricting Atrium's ability to add provisions to its contracts that would be considered anticompetitive.
- On July 3, 2017, it was reported that Carolina's Healthcare System (CHS) had agreed to pay a $6.5 million False Claims Act settlement to settle charges over its billing practices brought by a whistle blower, U.S. Attorney Jill Rose said Friday. Prosecutors contended the Charlotte-based hospital system had been improperly "up-coding" claims for urine drug tests in order to receive much higher payments than CHS would have if billed properly. CHS contended that two separate consultants had reviewed its practices and had confirmed its coding selection amid "complex and constantly changing billing guidelines." After two years into the process, CHS said it was in the system's best interest to resolve the charges.
- In September 2024, NBC News reported on Atrium Health's aggressive debt collection practices, including suing a widower struggling to pay off cancer treatment bills for his deceased wife. In response, the company announced that "some 11,500 liens on people's homes in North Carolina and five other states will be released".

== See also ==
- List of public hospitals in the United States
