= Atrium Health University City =

Coordinates: 35.3063°N 80.7474°W

- Atrium Health

Geography
- Location: Charlotte, North Carolina, United States

Organisation
- Care system: Private, Medicaid, Medicare
- Type: Community

Services
- Emergency department: Yes
- Beds: 130

Links
- Website: https://atriumhealth.org/locations/atrium-health-university-city
- Other links: List of hospitals in North Carolina

Atrium Health University City is a 130-bed acute care facility located in Charlotte's University City area. This hospital is the location of the second busiest emergency departments in Mecklenburg County. It is owned by Atrium Health, one of the nation's largest publicly owned, not-for-profit hospital operators. It originally operated under University Hospital before changing names to Carolinas Medical Center-University, Carolinas HealthCare System University, and finally to Atrium Health University City.
