= Atrium Health Cabarrus =

Coordinates: 35.4361783°N 80.6014674°W

- Atrium Health

Geography
- Location: Concord, North Carolina, United States

Organization
- Care system: Private, Medicaid, Medicare
- Type: General

Services
- Emergency department: Level III trauma center
- Beds: 457

Helipads
- Helipad: FAA LID: NC60

History
- Founded: 1930 as Cabarrus County Hospital/Cabarrus Memorial Hospital; 1997 as NorthEast Medical Center; 2007 as Carolinas Medical Center-NorthEast; 2015 as Carolinas HealthCare System-Northeast

Links
- Website: https://atriumhealth.org/locations/detail/atrium-health-cabarrus
- Lists: Hospitals in North Carolina

Atrium Health Cabarrus (formerly Cabarrus Memorial Hospital, later NorthEast Medical Center, Carolinas Medical Center-Northeast and Carolinas HealthCare System NorthEast) is a 457-bed, acute-care, teaching hospital located in Concord, North Carolina, United States. Founded in 1937 by Charles A. Cannon and George Batte, Jr. during the Great Depression as Cabarrus County Hospital, the hospital has continued to expand. Today it serves most of Cabarrus County as a regional hospital. On December 16, 2006, Carolinas HealthCare System NorthEast opened the new Jeff Gordon Children's Hospital in the Clinical Services building.

In early 2007, The Pavilion was completed, featuring the newly expanded Batte Cancer Center (a partner with Levine Cancer Institute) and Sanger Heart & Vascular. The Cabarrus College of Health Sciences is also on the campus.

== History ==
The hospital first opened its doors in 1937 as Cabarrus County Hospital, founded by George A. Batte, Jr. and Charles A. Cannon. It was later renamed Cabarrus Memorial Hospital. In 1991, the hospital was reorganized as a non-profit organization. In 1997, it was renamed as NorthEast Medical Center. In 2002, the hospital received the title of "58th Magnet Hospital," an award for nursing excellence. In 2007, the hospital joined the Charlotte-based Carolinas Healthcare System (now Atrium Health,) and was renamed Carolinas Medical Center-NorthEast, and later became Carolinas HealthCare System Northeast.

On April 3, 2012, it was announced that Carolinas Medical Center-NorthEast purchased the naming rights to the former Fieldcrest Cannon Stadium in nearby Kannapolis (home of the Kannapolis Intimidators minor league baseball team). It adopted the name CMC-NorthEast Stadium for the upcoming season. Per club policy, terms were not disclosed.

On August 2, 2019, the hospital changed its name to Atrium Health Cabarrus.
