= Atrium Health Union =

Coordinates: 34.9751965°N 80.522313°W

Carolinas HealthCare System Union
- Atrium Health

Geography
- Location: Monroe, North Carolina, United States

Organization
- Care system: Private, Medicaid, Medicare
- Type: General and specialized

Services
- Beds: 157
- Helipad: FAA LID: 2NC2

Links
- Website: http://www.carolinashealthcare.org/cmc-union
- Lists: Hospitals in North Carolina

Atrium Health Union, formerly known as Union Regional Medical Center, later Carolinas Medical Center-Union, is a 157-bed acute care facility located in Monroe, NC. This hospital is one of several community hospitals owned and operated by Charlotte based Atrium Health.

== History ==
The following events are associated with this hospital:

- 1918: The Ellen Fitzgerald Hospital (EFH), a tiny 18-room facility, opens in Union County. Alto Freed Mahoney, MD - a young surgeon from Mississippi - was in charge of the hospital and he took great pride in never turning away anyone who needed medical attention from the hospital.
- 1934: Dr. Mahoney passes away so the City of Monroe assumes operation of the hospital.
- 1935: The EFH is incorporated and leased to the Union County Board of Commissioners.
- 1953: After many years of significant growth, a new hospital - Union Memorial Hospital - is opened on the hospital's current site. The Ellen Fitzgerald Hospital remained open for chronically ill patients, thus becoming the first long-term care hospital in either North or South Carolina.
- 1965: The Smith Wing of Union Memorial Hospital was named in honor George Marvin Smith, MD, who served Monroe and Union County residents for 52 years and delivered more than 7,000 babies.
- 1968: Union Memorial Hospital is reorganized to change its status to a non-profit operating company.
- 1985: Union Memorial Hospital opens new acute care facility.
- 1992: Union Memorial Hospital opens Behavioral Health Center (First Step) and Franklin St. Ambulatory Clinic.
- 1995: Union Memorial Hospital is leased to the Charlotte Mecklenburg Hospital Authority, now operating as Atrium Health, and renamed Union Regional Medical Center. Over the next several years, many renovations and upgrades were made to the hospital, such as the addition of a new ER and the expansion of the Day Surgery Center and Endoscopy Unit.
- 1999: Union Regional Medical Center announces a $47 million expansion.
- 2002: Union Regional Medical Center opens 85,000 sq ft (7,900 m^{2}). Outpatient Treatment Pavilion.
- 2003: Union Regional Medical Center celebrates 50th anniversary.
- 2005: Union West Medical Plaza opens in Indian Trail.
- 2005: Union Regional Medical Center is renamed Carolinas Medical Center-Union.
- 2006: CMC-Union prohibits smoking and tobacco use.
- 2007: The Jesse Helms Nursing Center opens. The new facility houses 70 residents who need either long-term care or short-term rehabilitation services. It includes services for physical, occupational and speech therapy; psychiatric and psychological care; dental care; pharmacy services; licensed dietitians for nutritional needs; beautician services; and laundry facilities.
- 2008: A 60,000-square-foot (5,600 m^{2}) Medical Office Building opens on the campus of CMC-Union.
