= Advocate Health =

American healthcare system

Advocate Health, Inc.
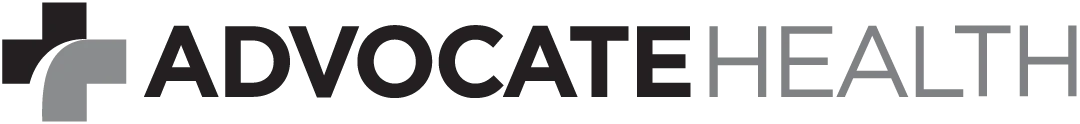
- Type: 501(c)(3)Nonprofit organization
- Industry: Healthcare
- Founded: December 2, 2022
- Headquarters: 1000 Blythe Boulevard, Charlotte, North Carolina, United States
- Number of locations: 69 hospitals (2024)
- Area served: Alabama, Illinois, Georgia, North Carolina, South Carolina and Wisconsin
- Key people: Eugene A. Woods(CEO, 2022-present
- Revenue: ▲US$9.2 billion (2025)
- Operating income: ▲US$38.94 million (2025)
- Net income: ▼US$499.5 million (2025)
- Number of employees: 160,000 (2025)
- Subsidiaries: Advocate Health Care, Aurora Health Care, Atrium Health, and Wake Forest University School of Medicine
- Website: advocatehealth.org

Advocate Health, Inc. is a nonprofit hospital network headquartered in Charlotte, North Carolina, it was created when Advocate Aurora Health and Atrium Health merged their operations on December 2, 2022. It operates facilities in 6 states in the United States. It is a founding member of Trustworthy and Responsible AI Network (TRAIN).

== History ==
On December 2, 2022, Advocate Health was created when Advocate Aurora Health and Atrium Health merged. After the merger it stopped suing patients for not paying their bills and reporting them to collection agencies.

In early March 2024, Advocate Health became a founding member of Trustworthy and Responsible AI Network, which was formed by Microsoft. In late March, it sold Maryland based Senior Helpers to Waud Capital, the amount that the private equity firm paid is not known. On September 20, Advocate Health announced that it would cancel 11,500 liens, some that have been unpaid for 20 years.

On February 11, 2026, Advocate Health announced it would donate $1 million to A Home For All, to fight homelessness and housing insecurity in Charlotte. On March 26, the hospital network announced a partnership with Zipline to create the largest hospital drone delivery network in the United States. It is expected to have over 100,000 deliveries, from Charlotte, Chicago, Milwaukee and Georgia. On May 27, it announced a partnership with Lind by using its AI platform with its electronic health record to screen patients for cancer clinical trials. On June 29, it was announced that Advocate Health partnered with Covista, to have nursing students from Chamberlain University gain experience at its hospitals to fill the nursing shortage.

== Finances ==
Year	Revenue	Operating income	Expense	Net income	Total Asset	Total Liability
2023		$31.75 million			$82.49 million	$82.49 million
2024	$333,741	▲$34.79 million	$2.174 million	$1.84 million	▲$105.05 million	▲$106.89 million
2025		▲$38.94 million				
