= Hospital network =

Parent organization for a collection of medical facilities

A hospital network is a public, non-profit or for-profit company or organization that provides two or more hospitals and other broad healthcare facilities and services. A hospital network may include hospitals in one or more regions within one or more states within one or more countries. A hospital network has one headquarters, usually within one of the regions served by the network facilities. (The terms hospital system and health care system are used more broadly to define the organization of people, institutions, and resources that deliver health care services to meet the health needs of a region or country.)

== History ==
Some of the earliest hospital networks were affiliated with charitable, religious organizations. The Catholic Church established a hospital network in medieval Europe that was vastly improved from the merely reciprocal hospitality of the Greeks and family-based obligations of the Romans. These hospitals were established to cater to "particular social groups marginalized by poverty, sickness, and age," according to historian of hospitals, Guenter Risse.

In the late 20th century hospital networks were established to make delivery of healthcare more efficient and to share specialized medical services and physicians across the network. To avoid financial losses due to shrinking reimbursements and rising costs as well as improving quality of care and avoid duplication of services, hospitals may consolidate certain services at one hospital. However, patients may need to travel farther if those services are no longer offered at their local hospital.

== Largest hospital networks ==
Hospital networks that do not have reliable sources may not be included; these are not necessarily complete lists.

=== Ranked by capacity ===
This is a list of hospital networks with a capacity of more than 2,500 beds.

Hospital network	Country	Beds	As of year	Ref
Alberta Health Services	Canada	40,905	2024	
Helios	Germany	38,129	2021	
HCA Healthcare	United States	38,015	2022	
Asklepios Kliniken	Germany	27,090	2019	
CommonSpirit Health	United States	17,148	2022	
Ascension	United States	16,241	2022	
IHH Healthcare	Malaysia	15,000		
Trinity Health	United States	14,621	2022	
Veterans Health Administration	United States	13,000		
Tenet Healthcare	United States	12,822	2022	
Manipal Hospitals India	India	12,000	2025	
Chang Gung Medical Foundation	Taiwan	11,360	2025	
Advocate Health	United States	10,528	2022	
Apollo Hospitals	India	10,261	2020	
Community Health Systems	United States	9,850	2022	
Providence Health & Services	United States	9,445	2022	
Kaiser Permanente	United States	9,217	2022	
University of Pittsburgh Medical Center	United States	8,800	2022	
AdventHealth	United States	8,038	2022	
First Affiliated Hospital of Zhengzhou University	China	7,000		
Cleveland Clinic	United States	6,026	2019	
University Hospitals Ruhr Bochum	Germany	5,645	2021	
SingHealth	Singapore	4,814	2021	
National Healthcare Group	Singapore	4,683	2019	
West China Medical Center	China	4,300		
Fortis Healthcare	India	4,000	2020	
Metro Pacific Hospitals	Philippines	3,200	2018	
Charité	Germany	3,099	2021	

=== Ranked by staff ===
This is a list of hospital networks with at least 20,000 staff.

Hospital	Country	Staff	As of year	Ref
Veterans Health Administration	United States	330,000		
HCA Healthcare	United States	309,000	2024	
Kaiser Permanente	United States	219,930	2024	
CommonSpirit Health	United States	175,000	2024	
Advocate Health	United States	155,000	2024	
Alberta Health Services	Canada	133,050	2024	
Helios	Germany	125,000	2021	
AdventHealth	United States	100,000	2025	
University of Pittsburgh Medical Center	United States	100,000	2024	
Mayo Clinic	United States	70,000	2019	
Cleveland Clinic	United States	80,642	2024	
Apollo Hospitals	India	62,939	2020	
IHH Healthcare	Malaysia	55,000		
Johns Hopkins Medicine	United States	53,352	2018	
Asklepios Kliniken	Germany	36,265	2019	
SingHealth	Singapore	31,570	2021	
Manchester University NHS Foundation Trust	United Kingdom	23,000	2019	

== By country ==
=== United States ===
The largest hospital networks headquartered in the United States are included in the table below. The name, headquarters location, number of hospitals, funding type and founding year are given for each network. As of 2023, there were 6,129 hospitals in the United States.

Hospital networks headquartered in the United States
Network	HQ city	State	No. of hospitals in network	Funding	Founded
United States Department of Veterans Affairs	Washington, D.C.	Washington, D.C.	171 (2021)	public (Federal)	1989
HCA Healthcare	Nashville	Tennessee	184 (2021)	for-profit	1968
Ascension	St. Louis	Missouri	139 (2021)	non-profit Catholic	1999
CommonSpirit Health (Note: In February 2019, CHI merged with Dignity Health. In February 2019, Dignity Health merged with Catholic Health Initiatives, becoming CommonSpirit Health.)	Chicago	Illinois	137 (2021)	non-profit Catholic	2019
Community Health Systems	Franklin	Tennessee	84 (2021)	for-profit	1985
Trinity Health	Livonia	Michigan	92 (2021)	non-profit Catholic	2000
LifePoint Health	Brentwood	Tennessee	84 (2021)	for-profit	1999
Advocate Health	Charlotte	North Carolina	69 (2024)	non-profit	2022
Tenet Healthcare	Dallas	Texas	65 (2021)	for-profit	1969
Vibra Healthcare	Mechanicsburg	Pennsylvania	45 (2021)	for-profit	2004
Providence Health & Services	Renton	Washington	52 (2021)	non-profit Catholic	2016
AdventHealth	Altamonte Springs	Florida	57 (2026)	non-profit (Seventh-day Adventist Church)	1973
Baylor Scott & White Health	Dallas	Texas	52 (2021)	for-profit	1897
Bon Secours Mercy Health	Cincinnati	Ohio	50 (2021)	non-profit Catholic	2018
Prime Healthcare Services	Ontario	California	45 (2021)	for-profit	2001
Sanford Health	Sioux Falls	South Dakota	46 (2021)	non-profit	1894
Mercy Health	St. Louis	Missouri	40 (2021)	non-profit Catholic	1871
University of Pittsburgh Medical Center (UPMC)	Pittsburgh	Pennsylvania	40 (2021)	non-profit	1893
Kaiser Permanente	Oakland	California	39 (2021)	consortium of for-profit and non-profit	1945
MercyOne	Clive	Iowa	25 (2021)	non-profit Catholic	1998 (Note: MercyOne is run under a joint operating agreement between Catholic Health Initiatives and Trinity Health.)
Christus Health	Irving	Texas	60 (2021)	non-profit Catholic	1999
Avera Health	Sioux Falls	South Dakota	35 (2021)	non-profit Catholic	1897
Ardent Health Services	Nashville	Tennessee	30 (2021)	for-profit	1993
Great Plains Health Alliance	Wichita	Kansas	29 (2021)	non-profit	1950
Texas Health Resources	Arlington	Texas	27 (2021)	non-profit faith based	1997
Banner Health	Phoenix	Arizona	30 (2021)	non-profit	1999
NewYork-Presbyterian Healthcare System	New York City	New York	26	non-profit Presbyterian	2015
Providence Health & Services	Renton	Washington	52 (2021)	non-profit Catholic	1859
Indian Health Service	Rockville	Maryland	46 (2021) (Note: Includes 24 IHS and 22 tribally operated hospitals)	public (Federal)	1955
Quorum Health Corporation	Brentwood	Tennessee	22 (2021)	for-profit	2015 (Note: Quorum Health Corporation is a spin-off of Community Health Systems.)
Universal Health Services	King of Prussia	Pennsylvania	26 (2021)	for-profit	1979
Intermountain Health	Salt Lake City	Utah	24 (2021)	non-profit	1970
Sutter Health	Sacramento	California	24 (2021)	non-profit	1921
Community Hospital Corporation	Plano	Texas	29 (2021)	for-profit	1996
Mayo Clinic Health System	Rochester	Minnesota	20 (2021)	non-profit	1992
Northwell Health	New Hyde Park	New York	23 (2021)	non-profit	1997
SSM Health	St. Louis	Missouri	23 (2021)	non-profit Catholic	1872
Baptist Health	Memphis	Tennessee	22 (2021)	non-profit Baptist	1955
UnityPoint Health	West Des Moines	Iowa	39 (2021)	non-profit	1993
Ballad Health	Johnson City	Tennessee	21 (2021)	non-profit	2018
Hospital Sisters Health System	Springfield	Illinois	15	non-profit Catholic	1978
BJC HealthCare	St. Louis	Missouri	15	non-profit	1993
Allina Health	Minneapolis	Minnesota	12	non-profit	1983

=== Canadian headquartered hospital networks ===
- Alberta Health Services, Province of Alberta, 106 hospitals
- Scarborough Health Network, Toronto, Ontario, 3 hospitals
- Sinai Health System, Toronto, Ontario, 2 hospitals
- The Ottawa Hospital, Ottawa, Ontario, 3 hospitals
- Toronto East Health Network
- Trillium Health Partners, Toronto, Ontario, 3 hospitals
- Unity Health Toronto, Toronto, Ontario, 3 hospitals
- University Health Network, Toronto, Ontario, 4 hospitals
- William Osler Health System, Brampton, Ontario, 2 hospitals
- Grey Bruce Health Services, Grey County, Ontario and Bruce County, Ontario, 6 hospitals
- Halton Healthcare, Greater Toronto Area, 3 hospitals
- London Health Sciences Centre, London, Ontario, 2 hospitals
- McGill University Health Centre, Montreal, Quebec, 7 hospitals

=== Irish headquartered hospital networks ===
A new grouping of hospitals was announced by the Irish Minister for Health, Dr. James Reilly TD in May 2013, as part of a restructure of Irish public hospitals and a goal of delivering better patient care:

- Dublin North East (subsequently renamed RCSI Hospitals)
- Dublin Midlands (subsequently renamed Dublin Midlands Hospital Group)
- Dublin East (subsequently renamed Ireland East Hospital Group)
- South/South West (subsequently renamed South/Southwest Hospital Group)
- West/North West (subsequently renamed Saolta University Health Care Group)
- Mid West (subsequently renamed UL Hospitals Group)

=== United Kingdom ===
- National Health Service (England)
- NHS Scotland
- NHS Wales
- Health and Social Care in Northern Ireland

=== Other ===
- Aga Khan Health Services, HQ in France
- Assistance Publique – Hôpitaux de Paris, Paris, France; 44 hospitals
- Chang Gung Medical Foundation, Taiwan, 8 hospitals
- Hirslanden Private Hospital Group, Switzerland, 17 hospitals

== See also ==
- Health system
- History of hospitals
