= The Pearl (Charlotte) =

Medical innovation district in North Carolina, United States

- The Pearl in September 2026 with the construction of Anova The Pearl visible in the foreground.
- Location: Midtown Charlotte, Charlotte, North Carolina
- Status: Under construction
- Groundbreaking: late 2022
- Estimated completion: 2024
- Website: www.thepearlclt.com

Companies
- Developer: Wexford Science & Technology

Technical details
- Buildings: The Howard R. Levine Center for Education, four medical research buildings, a hotel, residential tower
- Size: 26 acres (11 ha)

The Pearl is a 26-acre (11 ha) medical innovation district in Midtown Charlotte, Charlotte, North Carolina, United States, centered around the second Wake Forest School of Medicine campus that is currently under construction.

== History ==
The medical school is Charlotte's first four-year medical school. It is the product of a partnership between Atrium Health of Charlotte, Wake Forest Baptist Health, and Wake Forest University to create the second Wake Forest School of Medicine campus. The idea began taking shape in April 2019 when the three entities agreed to sign a letter of intent forming the partnership by the end of 2019.

The Pearl will be a mixed-use development containing medical office spaces, labs, retail, residential space, including affordable housing, community gathering and academic spaces. Atrium is intending for the district to create collaboration between researchers, students, doctors, engineers, and corporate innovators to increase medical knowledge. Rasu Shrestha, M.D., enterprise executive vice president and chief strategy and transformation officer at Atrium Health shared that the new Charlotte innovation district will be utilizing the successes of the Innovation Quarter in Winston-Salem, North Carolina such as local community to bring ideas, passion and curiosity to create a transformative district for the Charlotte region.

The idea began to become a reality with the Atrium Health and Wake Forest Baptist Health merger. The merger was first announced in April 2019 and completed in October of the same year. The new entity has a 42-hospital footprint across four states. Wake Forest School of Medicine will be the academic core of Atrium Health, which will be centered around the four-year medical school. Charlotte was the largest city in the country without a four-year medical school. The merger is being called a strategic brand combination, as a part of this the Winston-Salem, North Carolina–based Wake Forest Baptist Medical Center was renamed Atrium Health Wake Forest Baptist, it is the academic hospital of Wake Forest School of Medicine.

The district will be a public and private partnership. It is expected to create 5,500 onsite jobs and 11,500 jobs in the Charlotte area over the 15 years build out. The focus of the district will be research and developing businesses, creating housing, and public spaces with amenities which according to Atrium Health will create livable and vibrant community. Atrium Health plans to invest $1.5 billion. The district will support 63,000 jobs beyond its borders in the Charlotte area and have a $7.6 billion annual impact on the economy by 2040.

The exact location of the district will be just outside of Uptown Charlotte in Midtown Charlotte about a mile away from Atrium's flag hospital Carolinas Medical Center. The entire 26 acres (11 ha) site was owned by Atrium at the time of the announcement. The initial rezoning that was approved at the end of 2021 for 14 acres (5.7 ha) was for mixed-used development district with optional previsions. This zoning designation is flexible enough to allow varied mixed uses to include medical offices, hotels, multi-family housing and retail. In August 2022 demolition began on a decommissioned Atrium data center on the site located at 801 S McDowell Street. Formal ground-breaking is expected at the end of 2022. In the future the district could be expanded to 40 acres (16 ha).

The district has outlined $94 million in infrastructure improvements and additions needed to accommodate the development. They have requested $75 million of that to be funded by the public sector. The split is $40 million from Mecklenburg County and $35 million from the city. Some of the incentives include walking and cycling connections and a plaza at a cost of $9.07 million, intersection improvements for $5.88 million, road improvements for $13.98 million, an 800-space public parking deck for $28.15 million, and a pedestrian underpass for $3 million. In November 2021 the city approved $35 million of incentives. Then in December 2021 Mecklenburg County approved $40 million of incentives.

Baltimore based Wexford Science + Technology has been selected as the district developer. They are the developer behind Winston-Salem, North Carolina's Innovation Quarter that the district will be patterned after. The company also created a similar district in Baltimore called BioPark which is a medical innovation district for the University of Maryland. This campus features labs and medical office buildings for collaborative biomedical research.

In July 2021 Atrium Health and Wake Forest School of Medicine received approval from two accrediting organizations to open a school for third- and fourth-year medical students. These accrediting organizations are The Liaison Committee on Medical Education and the Southern Association of Colleges and Schools Commission on Colleges. The two-year school opened in March 2022. Dr. Angela Sharkey, a pediatric cardiologist was hired to be the senior associate dean for education to develop the school's curriculum. She started in September 2021. The curriculum will be patterned after the flagship campus in Winston-Salem, North Carolina. The school will use different teaching methods, such as holograms and plasticized cadavers, with potential to teach virtual courses between the two campuses. About 20 students were expected to be a part of the first group of students. In the spring of 2021 7 Wake Forest School of Medicine students began doing rotations at Atrium Health.

The district will be built in phases. Only specific plans for phase one have been announced, the plans include 300,000 square feet (28,000 m^{2}) 18-story 270 feet medical school building The Howard R. Levine Center for Education and the first of four planned research buildings, which will be 250,000 square feet (23,000 m^{2}) 10-stories tall and 150 feet. The Howard R. Levine Center for Education will also have the Carolinas College of Health Sciences, the Wake Forest University School of Business, and the brand new Wake Forest University School of Professional Studies co-located in the building. The first phase will complete by the fall of 2024 in time for fall semester. Other phases will include 3 additional research buildings, 2 parking lots with a combined 2,000 spaces, and a residential tower with 350 units.

In March 2022 Atrium announced the district would be anchored by IRCAD, a French research and training institute for surgeons. The Pearl will serve as its US headquarters and the company will plan to open their new office in 2025. IRCAD specializes in minimally invasive surgery techniques. Their research labs utilize research-and-development units for computer science and robotics to develop tools for diagnosis, planning and surgery simulation. IRCAD's training center offer on-site and online training with hands-on sessions. In July 2023 Siemens Healthineers announced it will work onsite with IRCAD North America to develop innovative surgery techniques.

Research One, the 10-story building, will open in September. It will be anchored by IRCAD North America occupying 125,000 square feet (11,600 m^{2}), the first four floors. Connect Labs will occupy 30,000 square feet (2,800 m^{2}), Siemens Healthineers will occupy 60,000 square feet (5,600 m^{2}), and Wexford Science & Technology will lease 30,000 square feet (2,800 m^{2}). Michigan-based Stryker will be the final tenant. These leases bring the building to 80% occupancy.

On June 2, 2025, The Pearl hosted its opening ceremony. The first class will be composed of 48 students, chosen from 15,000 applicants, with class sizes increasing to 100 over the next five years. July14, 2025 the first class, composed of 48 students, started classes.

== See also ==
- List of tallest buildings in Charlotte
- List of tallest buildings in North Carolina / the United States / the world
