= Midtown Charlotte =

Urban neighborhood in Charlotte, North Carolina

- Neighborhood
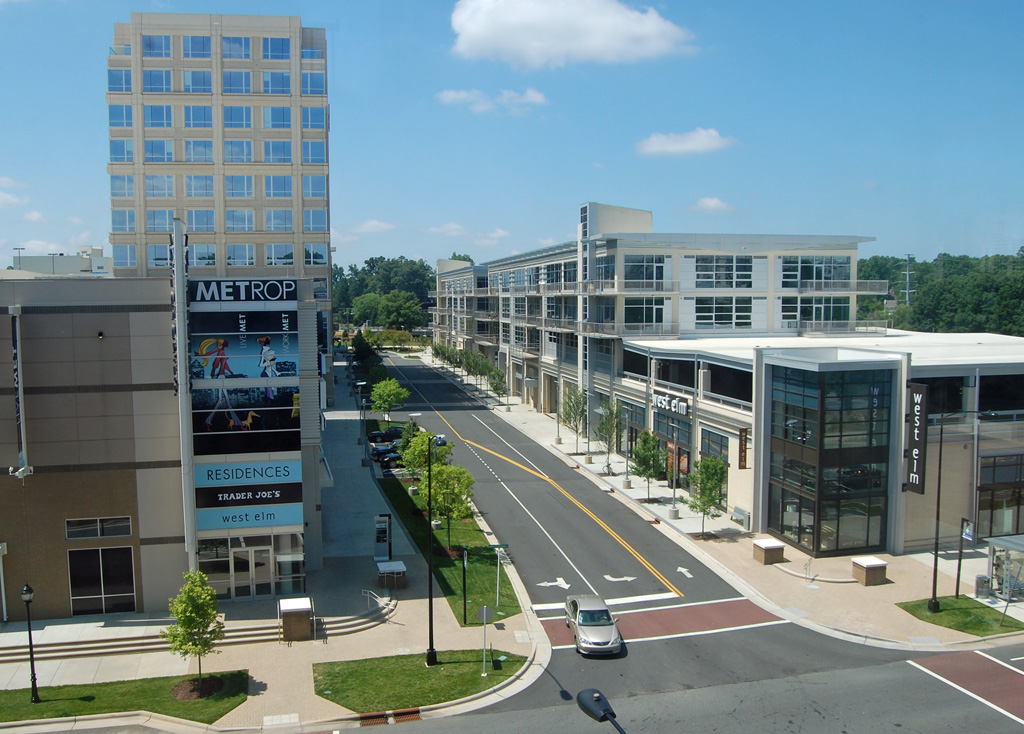
- The Metropolitan mixed-use development in Midtown Charlotte
- Interactive map of Midtown Charlotte
- Coordinates: 35.2117°N 80.8280°W
- Country: United States
- State: North Carolina
- City: Charlotte

Population (2024 (estimate))
  - Total: ~2,750
- Time zone: UTC−5 (EST)
  - Summer (DST): UTC−4 (EDT)

Midtown Charlotte is a mixed-use urban neighborhood in Charlotte, North Carolina, located immediately east of the city’s central business district, Uptown Charlotte. The area functions as a transitional district between Uptown and nearby neighborhoods including Elizabeth, Dilworth, Cherry, and Plaza Midwood. Midtown is characterized by high-density residential development, office space, retail corridors, public green space, and major medical and innovation facilities.

== Geography ==
Midtown Charlotte is situated directly east and southeast of Uptown Charlotte. The neighborhood is traversed by the Little Sugar Creek Greenway, which connects Midtown to Freedom Park and the citywide greenway network. Its central location provides proximity to major arterial roads, employment centers, and public transportation infrastructure.

== Demographics ==
Midtown Charlotte has an estimated population of approximately 2,700–2,800 residents. The neighborhood has a relatively young demographic profile compared to the citywide average, reflecting its concentration of apartments, condominiums, and proximity to employment and medical institutions.

== History ==
The area now known as Midtown Charlotte developed significantly during the mid-20th century as Charlotte expanded beyond its historic core. In 1959, Charlottetowne Mall opened on Kings Drive, becoming one of the first enclosed shopping malls in the southeastern United States and establishing Midtown as a major retail destination outside Uptown.

By the late 1990s, the mall had declined, and the site was redeveloped into The Metropolitan, a large mixed-use complex completed in the early 2000s. This redevelopment marked the beginning of Midtown’s transformation into a higher-density urban district with residential, office, and retail uses.

== Economy ==
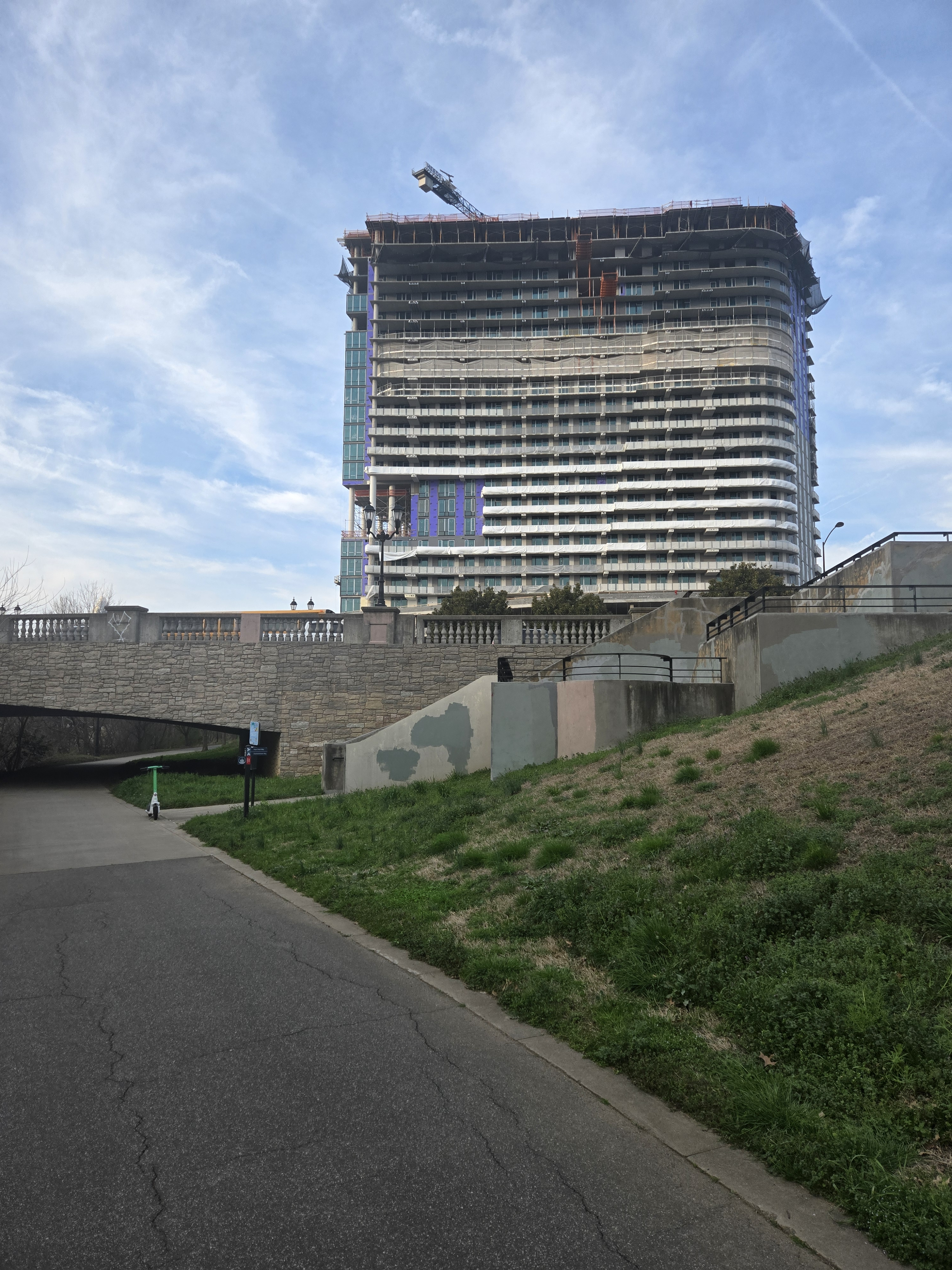
The Metropolitan Tower under construction in March 2026.

Midtown contains approximately 1.2 million square feet of office space, making it one of Charlotte’s primary secondary office submarkets outside Uptown. Office uses include professional services firms, healthcare-related organizations, and administrative offices affiliated with regional employers and medical institutions.

The neighborhood includes approximately 680,000 square feet of retail space, primarily concentrated in mixed-use developments such as The Metropolitan. Retail offerings include Target, Best Buy, Trader Joe's, At Home, and several restaurants serving both residents and nearby employment centers.

=== The Pearl Innovation District ===
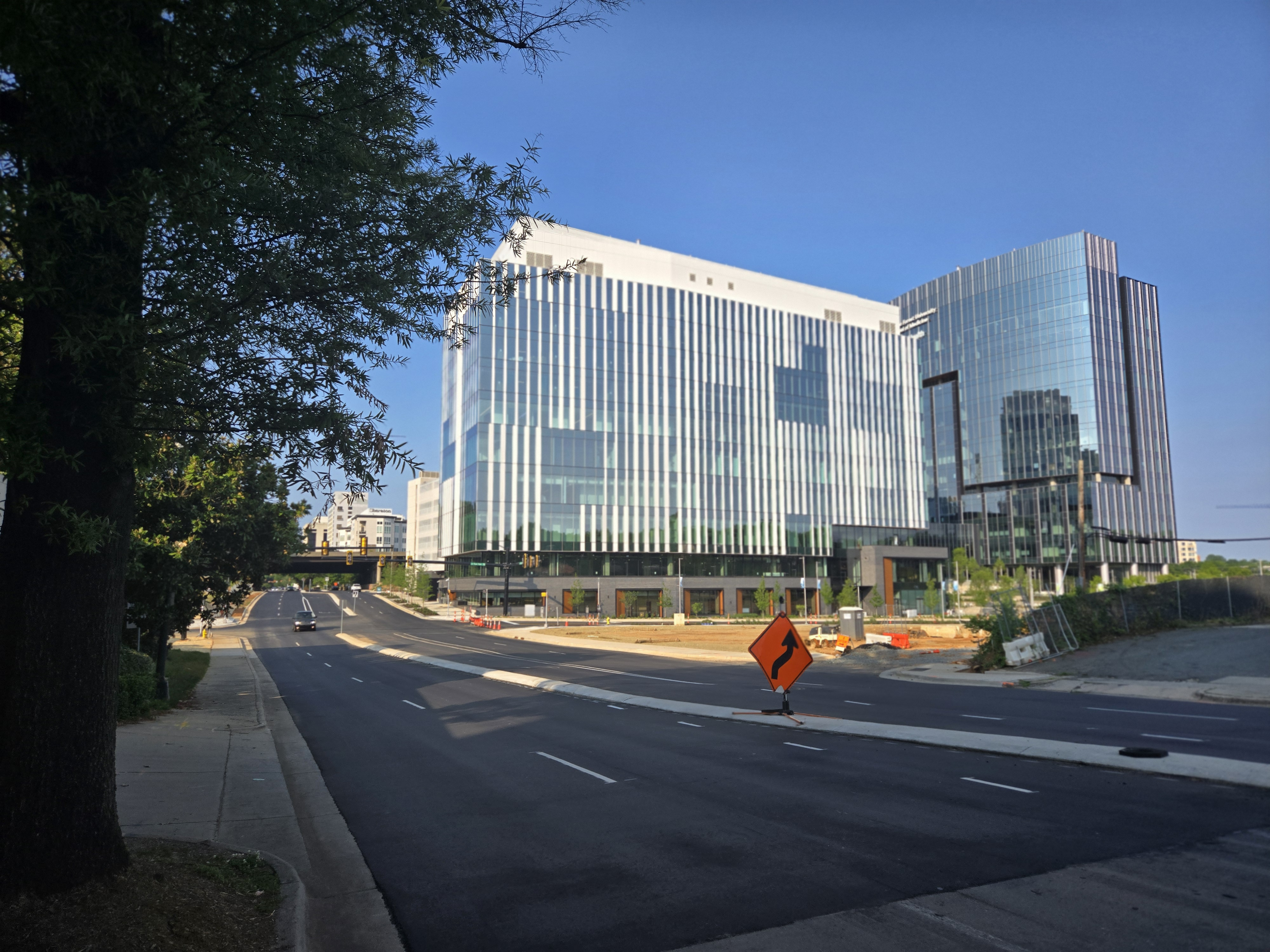
IRCAD's North American headquarters (left) and The Howard R. Levine Center for Education (right)

A major component of Midtown’s recent development is The Pearl Innovation District, a public–private partnership focused on healthcare, medical education, and biomedical research. The district is anchored by the Wake Forest School of Medicine, the city’s first four-year medical school campus. Phase I of The Pearl comprises approximately 700,000 square feet of academic, research, office, and retail space. In addition to the medical school, the district is also the home of the Carolinas College of Health Sciences and the Wake Forest University School of Business. Upon full build-out, the district is projected to generate more than 11,500 jobs regionally, with thousands of on-site positions in education, research, and healthcare.

== Parks and recreation ==
Midtown includes a growing network of parks, greenways, and recreational amenities that support both active and passive recreation. These spaces are integrated into the neighborhood’s mixed-use development pattern and provide connectivity to surrounding districts.

Midtown Park is a one-acre urban park located near Kings Drive and Baxter Street. Opened in 2012, the park features open lawn areas, seating, public art installations, and pedestrian pathways. Midtown Park also serves as a community gathering space and hosts occasional public events. The neighborhood is traversed by the Little Sugar Creek Greenway, a multi-use trail system that provides walking and cycling access through Midtown and connects the area to Freedom Park, Pearl Street Park, and other parts of Charlotte’s greenway network. The greenway also plays a role in flood mitigation and environmental restoration along Little Sugar Creek. Additional recreational amenities are incorporated into private and institutional developments, including landscaped courtyards, plazas, and pedestrian promenades associated with mixed-use projects and the Pearl Innovation District. These spaces contribute to Midtown’s emphasis on walkability and outdoor activity within an urban setting.

== Transportation ==
Midtown Charlotte is served by a combination of streetcar service, bus routes, and a network of major arterial roadways that provide connectivity to Uptown Charlotte, surrounding neighborhoods, and regional transportation corridors. The neighborhood is served by the Charlotte Area Transit System (CATS), including the CityLynx Gold Line. The Gold Line connects Midtown with Uptown Charlotte, Charlotte Transportation Center, Central Piedmont Community College, and eastern neighborhoods. Multiple CATS bus routes also serve the area, providing local and cross-town transit connections.

The area is bordered and traversed by several major roadways that function as key urban corridors. South Kings Drive serves as one of the primary north–south routes through Midtown, linking the neighborhood directly to Uptown Charlotte and southeastern portions of the city. Kings Drive also parallels portions of the Little Sugar Creek Greenway and provides access to mixed-use developments such as The Metropolitan and Midtown Park. East Morehead Street and Independence Boulevard (U.S. Route 74) are major east–west corridors located near Midtown’s southern and northern edges, respectively. Independence Boulevard provides a limited-access route connecting Midtown to eastern Charlotte and surrounding suburbs, while East Morehead Street links Midtown to Dilworth, Myers Park, and areas southwest of Uptown. McDowell Street and Baxter Street function as important local connectors between Uptown Charlotte, Midtown, and adjacent neighborhoods. These roadways also provide direct access to institutional and medical facilities, including the Pearl Innovation District and nearby healthcare campuses.

Midtown Charlotte supports pedestrian and bicycle travel through sidewalks, on-street bicycle facilities, and off-street greenways. The Little Sugar Creek Greenway provides a continuous multi-use trail through Midtown, connecting the neighborhood to Freedom Park and other parts of Charlotte’s expanding greenway system. These facilities contribute to Midtown’s walkability and its role as a multimodal urban district.
