= WFIQ =

WFIQ may refer to:

- WFIQ (TV), a television station (channel 36 / 22 digital) licensed to Florence, Alabama
- Wake Forest Innovation Quarter, a research park in Winston-Salem, North Carolina
