= Julie Ann Freischlag =

American vascular surgeon

- Born: 1955 (age 70–71); Decatur, Illinois, US
- Spouse: Phil Roethle

Academic background
- Education: Bsc, Biology, 1976, University of Illinois; MD, Rush Medical College

Julie Ann Freischlag (born 1955) is an American vascular surgeon and current CEO of Atrium Health Wake Forest Baptist. She was the first female surgeon-in-chief of The Johns Hopkins Hospital and the first female chief of vascular surgery at the University of California, Los Angeles. In 2017, Freischlag was appointed interim dean of Wake Forest School of Medicine and CEO of the Wake Forest Baptist Medical Center. During the COVID-19 pandemic in North America, Freischlag was named chief academic officer of Atrium Health, Inc., and appointed the president-elect of the American College of Surgeons.

== Early life and education ==
Freischlag was born in 1955 in Illinois and skipped the first grade. She enrolled at the University of Illinois with the intent of becoming a high school teacher but switched to premed when the school closed its education program. She enrolled at Rush Medical College for her medical degree where she found a mentor in Thomas R. Witt. During her time at Rush, she found she enjoyed the "speed and pace of surgery" and chose to pursue it as a specialty. While interviewing for residency at the University of California, Los Angeles (UCLA), she was the sole woman in a group of 40 to 50 men. Upon graduating, she was accepted into UCLA's surgical residency program at the Ronald Reagan UCLA Medical Center.

== Career ==
Freischlag completed her residency as the sixth woman to finish the general surgery program at UCLA and the sixth woman to pass her vascular surgery boards. Following this, she accepted her first academic position as an assistant professor in residence at the University of California, San Diego (UCSD) in 1987. Two years later, she was recruited back to UCLA as the first female surgery faculty member. As the first female chief of vascular surgery, Freischlag was responsible for coordinating educational programs and conducting research, coordinating patient care and performing operations at the UCLA Medical Center. She shortly left UCLA to become an associate professor of vascular surgery at the Medical College of Wisconsin, where she was the recipient of the Zablocki Veterans Affairs Medical Center Federal Women's Program Outstanding Achievement Award. Freischlag shortly thereafter became first woman surgeon to be an associate professor and full professor at the institution. When she returned to UCLA in 1998, she also became the first female division chief.

Freischlag left UCLA in 2003 to become the William Stewart Halsted Professor and Director of the Department of Surgery at the Johns Hopkins School of Medicine and surgeon in chief of The Johns Hopkins Hospital. As the first female chief of the Department of Surgery at Johns Hopkins School of Medicine (JHU), Nita Ahuja said that this let her know it was "OK to be a mom." Upon announcing her appointment, Edward D. Miller called her "a 'triple threat' surgeon" and that she would be "standing on the shoulders of giants." Within the first two months of being in her position, she said she spent "12 hours a day trying to understand the enormous operation she controls" and slept "five or six hours a night." During her tenure as director of surgery, she was appointed editor of the Archives of Surgery, one of the JAMA/Archives journals published by the American Medical Association. Freischlag also improved coordination among the hospital's leadership teams, increased surgical volumes, and oversaw the creation of the Center for Surgical Trials and Outcomes Research. By 2013, Freischlag was elected the first female president of the Society for Vascular Surgery.

Freischlag left JHU in 2014 to become vice chancellor for human health sciences and dean of the UC Davis School of Medicine, replacing Claire Pomeroy. At UC Davis, she oversaw UC Davis Health System's academic, research, and clinical programs, including the Betty Irene Moore School of Nursing and UC Davis Medical Center. During the 2014–15 academic year, she was also elected to the National Academy of Medicine. Throughout her tenure, Freischlag increased the number of females enrolled in medical school and helped launch Prep Médico, an initiative to increase the number of Latinos physicians.

Freischlag's stay at UC Davis was short-lived, however, as she soon left to become the chief executive officer of the Wake Forest Baptist Medical Center. By May, she was also appointed Interim Dean of Wake Forest School of Medicine as a replacement for Edward Abraham. In recognition of her academic accomplishments, she was inducted into the Royal College of Surgeons of Edinburgh and named one of the Physician Leaders to Know by Becker's Hospital Review. During the COVID-19 pandemic in North America, Freischlag was named chief academic officer of Atrium Health, Inc., and appointed the president-elect of the American College of Surgeons.

In 2020, during the height of the COVID-19 pandemic, Freischlag announced 16 week furloughs and 20-30% pay cuts for Wake Forest Baptist Medical Center employees. Later that same year, Freischlag herself received a 40% increase in total compensation.

In 2022 while CEO of Wake Forest Baptist, Freischlag elected to fire the director of the Comprehensive Cancer Center without cause the day after award of a Cancer Center Support Grant in his name. Freischlag's actions were described as "at best very clumsy and at worst, deceptive" by cancer center historians. Freischlag's actions resulted in the entire external advisory board resigning in protest and the National Cancer Institutes truncating funding to Wake Forest Baptist Comprehensive Cancer Center.

== Personal life ==
Freischlag is married to Phil Roethle, a retired financial executive. Freischlag has three children: Matthew, Paul, and Taylor.
