= Alyce Chenault Gullattee =

American physician (1928–2020)

- Alyce Chenault Gullattee, from a 1971 issue of Essence magazine.
- Born: Alyce Vantoria Chenault; June 28, 1928; Detroit, Michigan U.S.
- Died: April 30, 2020 (aged 91); Rockville, Maryland U.S.
- Occupations: Physician, psychiatrist, addiction specialist

Alyce Chenault Gullattee (June 28, 1928 – April 30, 2020) was an American psychiatrist, medical school professor, activist, and expert on addiction.

She was a faculty member in the psychiatry department at Howard University College of Medicine for over fifty years.

== Early life and education ==
Alyce Vantoria Chenault was born in Detroit, Michigan, one of the twelve children of Earl Chenault and Ella Bertha McLendon Chenault. Her father worked in the automobile industry. She graduated from Northern High School in Detroit in 1946. In 1951, Gullattee had earned a US Public Health Fellowship at Howard, while also working in a Washington D.C. pathology lab in pursuit of becoming a pathologist. She earned a bachelor's degree in zoology at the University of California, Santa Barbara in 1956, and a medical degree at Howard University in 1964, with residencies at St. Elizabeths Hospital and George Washington University Hospital, both in Washington, D.C. She was a member of Zeta Phi Beta, a Black sorority.

== Career ==
In 1952, Gullattee worked at the Southwest Settlement House in Washington, D.C., and started a supervised playground program. Gullattee joined the faculty of Howard University in 1970, in the department of neuropsychiatry. She was director of the university's Institute on Drug Abuse and Addiction. She was also a clinical professor at Howard University Hospital. She was known to visit active addicts directly, bringing them to the hospital for further treatment, even knitting a baby blanket for an addicted patient's newborn son. She also consulted on psychiatric matters for the Juvenile and Domestic Relations Court of Arlington County, Virginia. She served on the board of trustees of Wesleyan University, on the National Medical Association's Drug Committee, and on several White House drug task forces. She had a long association with the NAACP, in various local leadership positions in California.

Gullattee was a founder and first president of the Student National Medical Association. She was called as a consultant to the scene of the Attica Prison violence in 1971. She was a speaker at a conference on Black Women at the University of Louisville in 1974; "I believe that the role of the female as an agent of change has been overlooked," she explained. In 1983, she was head of the Alcohol and Drug Abuse Services Administration (ADASA) of the city of Washington, D.C., and was a speaker at the first National Conference on Black Women's Health Issues, held at Spelman College.

In 1989, she was in the news concerning a police report on the cocaine addiction and overdose hospitalizations of Washington, D.C. mayor Marion Barry. She denied that she had made any such report.

== Personal life and death ==
Alyce Chenault married educator Latinee Gullattee in 1948, in Santa Barbara. They had four children, including daughters Deborjha and Aishaetu. She suffered a stroke in February 2020, and died from COVID-19 in Rockville, Maryland, on April 30, 2020, at age 91.
