= Coy C. Carpenter Library =

Library in Wake Forest University

Coordinates: 36.0897°N 80.2665°W

The Coy C. Carpenter Library and Dorothy Carpenter Medical Archives, located at Wake Forest School of Medicine, is a library named after the first dean of the university's medical school, Coy Cornelius Carpenter, M.D., and his wife, Dorothy (Mitten) Carpenter.

Coy C. Carpenter was dean of the School of Medicine of Wake Forest University from 1936 to 1967 and Vice President for Health Affairs from 1963 to 1967. He guided the school through the transition from a two-year to a four-year program and the move from Wake Forest to Winston-Salem in 1941. He authored The Story of Medicine at Wake Forest University (Chapel Hill: University of North Carolina Press, 1970).
