= Detroit International Academy for Young Women =

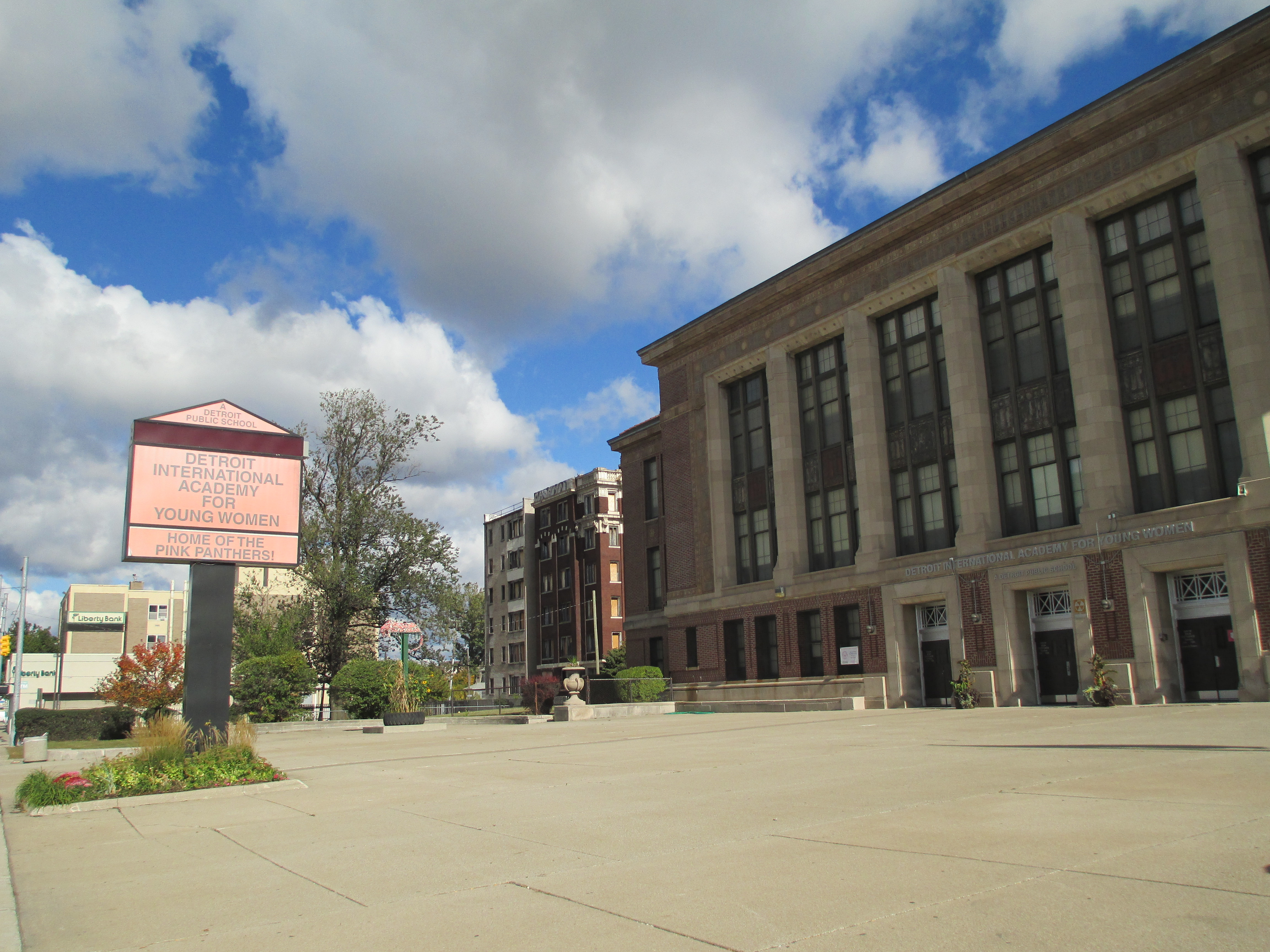

Location
- 9026 Woodward; Detroit, Michigan 48202; United States
- 42°22′58″N 83°04′50″W

Information
- Type: Public high school
- Established: 2005
- School district: Detroit Public Schools
- Grades: PK–12
- Website: www.detroitk12.org/dia

Student assessments
- 2021–22 school year Change vs. prior year

M-STEP 11th grade proficiency rates (Science / Social Studies)
- Advanced %: ≤50 / ≤20
- Proficient %: ≤50 / ≤20
- PR. Proficient %: – / –
- Not Proficient %: – / –

Average test scores
- SAT Total: 771.9 (▼ −63.1)

Detroit International Academy for Young Women (DIA) is a PK-12 school in Detroit, Michigan. It is Michigan's sole public girls' school, located in the former Northern High School.

The school mascot is The Pink Panther.

== History ==
The school opened in a building on Woodward Avenue in 2005. Its location is the former Northern High School building. At the time it opened, the school had 78 students. The school changed into an all girls' school after July 2006, when the Michigan Legislature passed a bill permitting the establishment of all girls' and boys' public schools. In its first year of being a girls' school there were 95 students in grades 9-10. It moved into its current location in the fall of 2007. In 2008 there were about 400 girls attending the school. Originally a high school, it began middle school classes around 2009, and around 2010 it began elementary classes. That year there were 530 students. In 2014, 502 girls were registered at the school.

In 2015 the school began holding white dress graduations instead of the usual cap and gown graduations. Several of the dresses were donated since most of the students receive free or reduced school lunches, a mark of having low income. Many private girls' schools in the United States use white dress graduations. 60 girls graduated during the 2015 ceremony.

== Student body ==
As of April 2015, African-Americans comprise 86% of the student body. The second largest demographic is Asians, at 5%. 82% of students are designated as economically disadvantaged. Most students qualify for a free or reduced-price lunch.

Students include African-Americans, Bangladeshis, Hispanics and Latinos, and Whites. DPS stated that the school has a "strong tie to the Bangladeshi community." Principal Beverly Hibbler stated that the all-female environment was attractive to persons in the Bangladeshi culture. In 2010 about 45-50 students were Bangladeshi.

Persons living outside of the DPS district are allowed to attend DIA. As of 2010 some students reside in suburbs outside of Detroit; their parents typically work around Downtown Detroit and the students go to and from school using their own transportation.

== See also ==
- Douglass Academy for Young Men - A public all boys' school in Detroit
