= Atrium Health Wake Forest Baptist =

Coordinates: 36.0904119°N 80.2697653°W

- Atrium Health

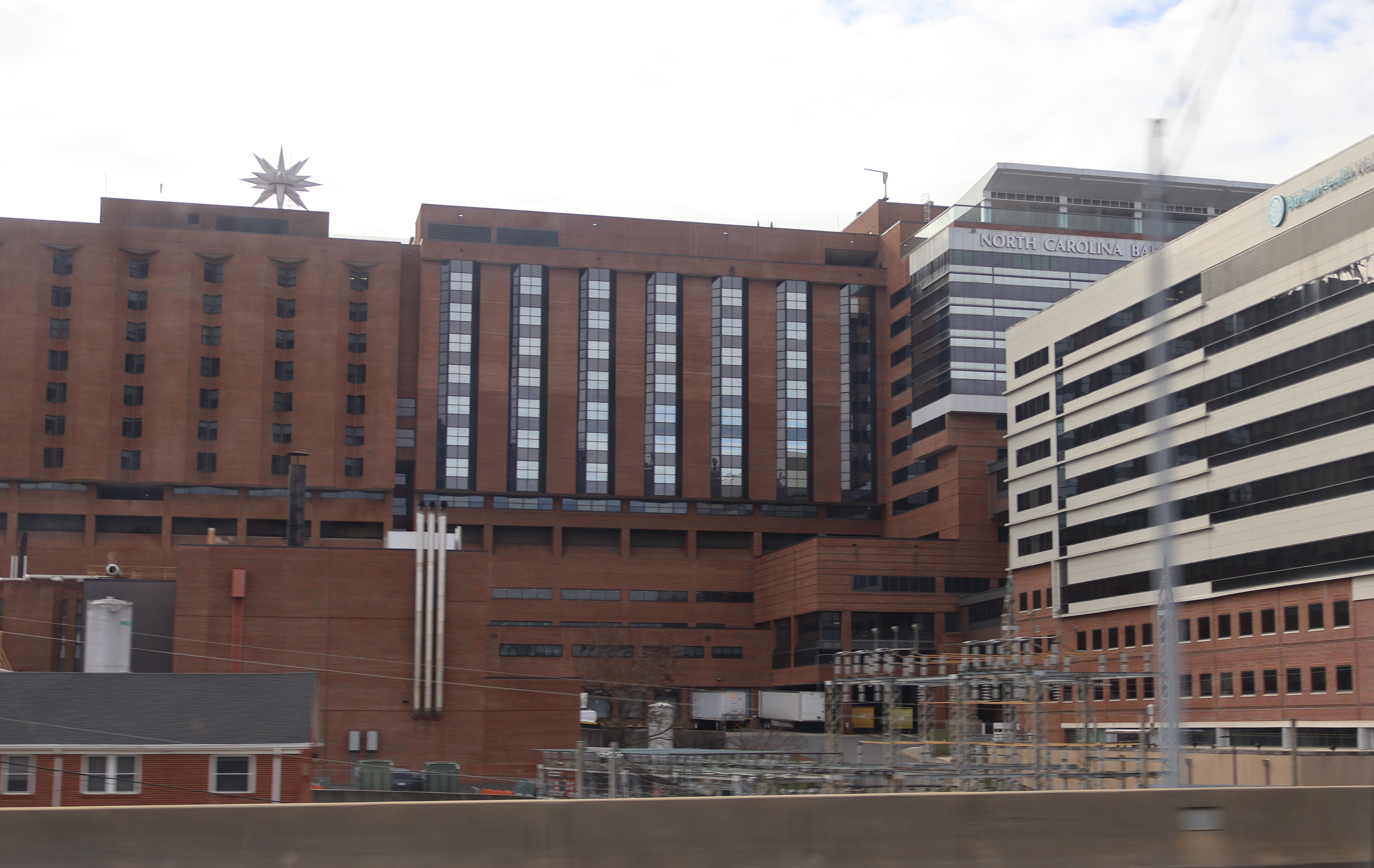

Geography
- Location: Winston-Salem, North Carolina, United States

Organization
- Care system: Private
- Funding: Non-profit hospital
- Type: Teaching
- Affiliated university: Wake Forest School of Medicine
- Network: Advocate Health

Services
- Emergency department: Level I Adult Trauma Center / Level I Pediatric Trauma Center
- Beds: 1,535 licensed beds
- Helipad: (FAA LID: 5NC7)

History
- Opened: 1902 as Bowman Gray School of Medicine; 1923 as North Carolina Baptist Hospital; 1997 as Wake Forest University Baptist Medical Center; 2011 as Wake Forest Baptist Health; 2021 as Atrium Health Wake Forest Baptist

Links
- Website: www.wakehealth.edu
- Lists: Hospitals in North Carolina

Atrium Health Wake Forest Baptist is an academic medical center and health system located in Winston-Salem, North Carolina, and part of Charlotte-based Advocate Health. It is the largest employer in Forsyth County, with more than 19,220 employees and a total of 198 buildings on 428 acres. In addition to the main, tertiary-care hospital in Winston-Salem known as Atrium Health Wake Forest Baptist Medical Center, the Atrium Health Wake Forest Baptist Health system operates five community hospitals in the surrounding region. The entity includes:

- Atrium Health Wake Forest Baptist, its clinical enterprise
- Wake Forest School of Medicine, its research and education arm
- Innovation Quarter, an operating division involved with partnerships, education, licensing and start-ups.

== History ==
Wake Forest College Medical School was founded as a two-year medical school on the campus of Wake Forest College in Wake Forest, North Carolina, in 1902. The 88-bed hospital opened May 28, 1923 on 11 acres in Winston-Salem after the Baptist State Convention of North Carolina sought to create a network of hospitals for those who could not afford to pay for care. The will of a president of R.J. Reynolds Tobacco Co. gave about $750,000 to move the medical school to Winston-Salem and make it a four-year institution. Named after its benefactor, Bowman Gray School of Medicine opened in Winston-Salem in 1941, affiliating with N.C. Baptist Hospital to create "The Miracle on Hawthorne Hill".

Brenner Children's Hospital, a 144-bed "hospital within a hospital", opened in 1986. In 1997, the institutions realigned as Wake Forest University Baptist Medical Center. In 2011, as part of the institution's move to become a unified structure, the corporate entity was rebranded as Wake Forest Baptist Medical Center. Clinical operations throughout a 24-county service area in northwest North Carolina and southwest Virginia now fall under the umbrella of Wake Forest Baptist Health, and the academic component is now known as Wake Forest School of Medicine.

In 2002, Wake Forest Baptist began operating the Davie County Hospital in Mocksville, which was built in 1956 and expanded in 1965 and 1974. Davie Medical Center in Bermuda Run opened Medical Plaza 1 in August 2013, and Medical Plaza 2 in October 2013. The second plaza added an emergency department and operating room, among other features. A $47 million, 78,220-square-foot 50-bed expansion opened April 3, 2017. Inpatient services were moved from the Mocksville location.

On October 1, 2008, Lexington Memorial Hospital affiliated with Wake Forest Baptist. Since then, the two institutions have helped each other with research and patient care.

In July 2017, Wake Forest Baptist began a 30-year lease with Wilkes Medical Center after an agreement with North Wilkesboro. WFB and WMC had already been working together for nearly a decade, and decided to expand their services together.

On October 25, 2017, Wake Forest Baptist and High Point Regional Health System announced that Wake Forest Baptist would take over High Point Regional, a part of UNC Health Care since 2013, by summer 2018. The change was touted as a way to encourage the growth of High Point Regional and expand its ability to care for patients.

On April 10, 2019, Wake Forest Baptist and Atrium Health in Charlotte, North Carolina, signed a memorandum of understanding as the first step toward a partnership. On October 31 the companies said an agreement had been reached and, pending regulatory approval, the partnership would be completed March 31, 2020. At the time it was announced that a medical school in Charlotte could be built by 2021 or 2022. On October 9, 2020, the companies announced they would become one, with the name Atrium Health. More specific details about the medical school were revealed in February 2021, including plans for a seven-story tower, and on March 24, 2021, Atrium Health announced a 20-acre site at Baxter and McDowell streets. School of Medicine dean Dr. Julie Ann Freischlag said construction would start in 2022. Charlotte was the largest city in the country without a four-year medical school. The Charlotte campus formally opened June 2, 2025.

Effective August 18, 2021, the branding changed to Atrium Health Wake Forest Baptist. On December 2, 2022, Advocate Aurora Health and Atrium Health merged creating Advocate Health

== Services ==
The hospital is a Level I trauma center serving the entire Piedmont region of North Carolina. It also houses one of three Level I Pediatric Trauma Centers in North Carolina. It also offers a pediatric emergency department, and pediatric and neonatal intensive-care units. It is also home to AirCare, the hospital's critical-care transport service, which operates ground ambulances as well as three helicopters at the critical-care level.

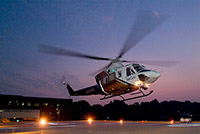
AirCare helicopter

The Wake Forest Innovations division operates Wake Forest Innovation Quarter, a mixed-use center in downtown Winston-Salem that is a hub for some of the world's foremost biotechnology, materials science and information technology research. Key tenants in the park are the Wake Forest Institute for Regenerative Medicine (WFIRM), which is working to engineer replacement tissues and organs and develop healing cell therapies for more than 40 different areas of the body, and Inmar, an information technology company that employs 900 people.

Wake Forest Baptist Health operates 16 free-standing outpatient dialysis centers, which are located throughout the Triad and the Western Piedmont region, allowing patients to access dialysis services close to home; it is the largest academically owned and operated dialysis operation in the country. In 2012, a Joslin Diabetes Center opened at one of Wake Forest Baptist Health's locations in Winston-Salem, offering multidisciplinary care to diabetes patients; Joslin is an affiliate of Harvard Medical School, an international leader in diabetes research, care and education and in advanced research into nicotine receptors and its social impact.

Wake Forest Baptist Health also operates a network of subsidiaries and affiliate hospitals, including Wake Forest Baptist Health–Lexington Medical Center, a 94-bed acute-care facility in Lexington, NC, and Wake Forest Baptist Health–Davie Medical Center, which includes a 25-bed inpatient hospital in Mocksville, NC, and an outpatient campus in Bermuda Run, N.C., featuring a 24/7 emergency department, imaging and diagnostic services, and various specialty health and medical offices. Most recently Wake Forest Baptist Health affiliated with Wilkes Regional Medical Center, now called Wake Forest Baptist Health–Wilkes Medical Center, a 130-bed inpatient hospital in North Wilkesboro, NC, with a 30-year lease agreement. In 2024, itt was announced Wake Forest Baptist Health will build a new outpatient surgery center, medical office and cancer center in nearby Greensboro, North Carolina, with a planned opening in 2026. In July 2024, Wake Forest Baptist Health opened a new medical office at the Friendly Center in Northwest Greensboro.

== Rankings ==
The medical center was ranked for 2015–16 by U.S. News & World Report as among the nation's best hospitals in seven areas: Cancer, Ear, Nose & Throat, Gastroenterology & GI Surgery, Nephrology, Neurology & Neurosurgery, Pulmonology, and Urology. It is ranked as high-performing in five additional adult specialties: Cardiology and Heart Surgery, Diabetes and Endocrinology, Geriatrics, Gynecology, and Orthopedics. Brenner Children's Hospital, a 144-bed "hospital within a hospital" at the medical center, is nationally ranked in Orthopedics by U.S. News & World Report. Wake Forest provides a variety of medical services. It affiliates with multiple local medical centers for children and adults.

== Childress Institute for Pediatric Trauma ==
The Childress Institute for Pediatric Trauma was established in 2008 through a donation by Richard Childress and his wife, Judy. The institute's mission is to lead national efforts to reduce death and disability following injury to children less than 18 years old. Pediatric trauma is the No. 1 killer of children ages 1–18 in America. According to the Centers for Disease Control and Prevention (CDC), nearly 10,000 children die each year from trauma – more than all other causes combined. The Childress Institute, located at Wake Forest Innovation Quarter, is focused on funding research and medical education throughout the U.S. to improve treatment, as well as raising public awareness about the magnitude of pediatric trauma.

== Library and archives ==
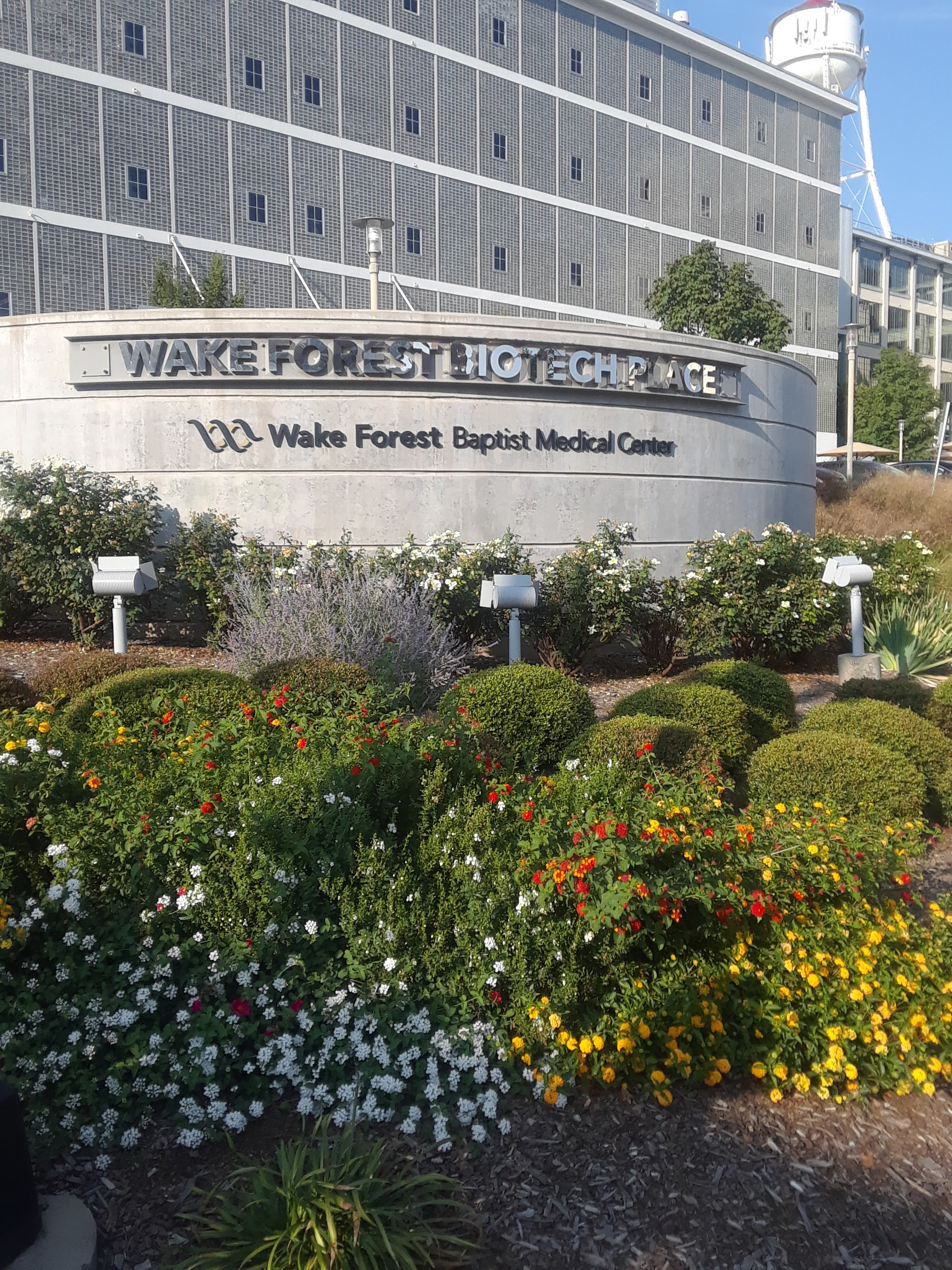
Wake Forest Medical Center Sign

The School of Medicine's Coy C. Carpenter Library and Dorothy Carpenter Medical Archives are named after the first dean of the school, Coy Cornelius Carpenter, M.D., and his wife, Dorothy (Mitten) Carpenter. The library and archives support clinical missions, educational research, staff and patrons of the Medical Center.
