= Brenner Children's Hospital =

Coordinates: 36.0902°N 80.2693°W

- Atrium Health
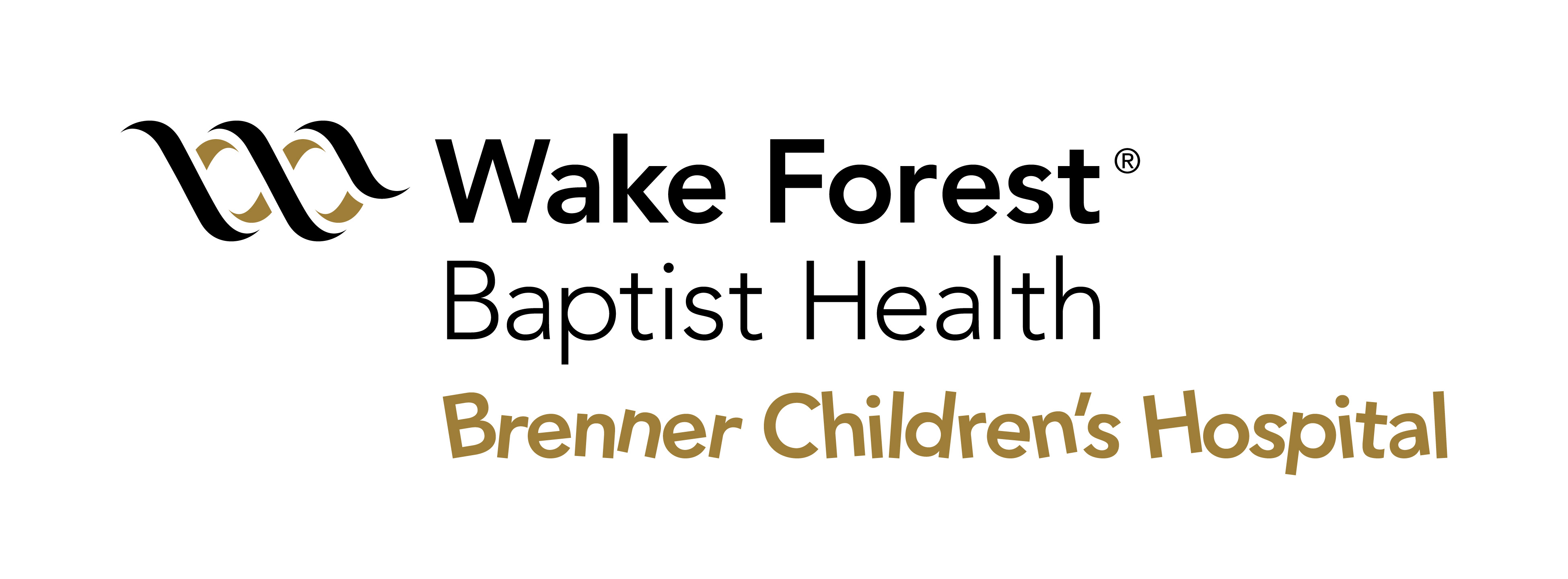

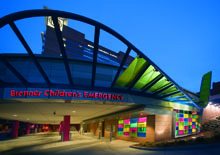

Geography
- Location: Winston-Salem,, North Carolina, United States

Organization
- Type: Tertiary
- Affiliated university: Wake Forest University

Services
- Standards: JCAHO
- Emergency department: Level I Pediatric Trauma Center

History
- Founded: 1986

Links
- Website: http://www.brennerchildrens.org
- Lists: Hospitals in North Carolina

Brenner Children's Hospital, formally known as Atrium Health Levine Children’s Brenner Children’s Hospital, is the 144-bed is a "hospital within a hospital" affiliated with Wake Forest Baptist Medical Center and Wake Forest University in Winston-Salem, North Carolina. It provides care to patients from birth to age 21 and is staffed by more than 120 full-time pediatric faculty members representing more than 30 areas of expertise, as well as all pediatric surgical specialties. Brenner Children's Hospital has its own Emergency Department, including the first Level I Pediatric Trauma Care unit in North Carolina.

More than 4,500 children are admitted to Brenner Children's Hospital every year and more than 21,000 pediatric subspecialty visits occur at hospital-based outpatient clinics. Brenner Children's Hospital generally treats children from western North Carolina, as well as parts of Virginia, South Carolina and Tennessee, although some come from further away for advanced care.

In 2015, Brenner Children's Hospital was ranked by U.S. News & World Report as one of America's best children's hospitals. It is nationally ranked in Orthopedics (#48).

== History ==
Brenner Children's Hospital opened in 1986 thanks to the generosity of the Brenner family, longtime members of the Winston-Salem community. It initially began when the family financed the Brenner Center for Adolescent Medicine in 1981, which was focused on developing a teaching program in adolescent medicine for students and pediatric residents, as well as a clinic at what was then North Carolina Baptist Hospital. At the time, it was the first such center in North Carolina and one of just 27 nationally.

Members of the Brenner family continued to work with hospital officials through the 1980s to create and plan a major hospital devoted to children's medicine. Brenner Children's Hospital opened in 1986, and in 1989 moved into its own wing within the larger hospital. In April 2002, Brenner Children's opened the $132 million Ardmore Tower West. In addition to its 144 private rooms, Brenner Children's has six playrooms, an interactive video wall and a rooftop garden with playground equipment.
