= Ruth Benca =

American sleep medicine researcher and neuropsychiatrist

Ruth M. Benca is an American psychiatrist and researcher in the fields of sleep medicine and neuropsychiatry. She is professor and chair of the department of psychiatry and human behavior at Wake Forest School of Medicine.

== Education and career ==
Benca attended Harvard University, where she received her undergraduate degree, and then studied for her medical degree and doctorate in pathology at the University of Chicago. She graduated in 1981 and began working as a professor in the 1990s, becoming the chair of the department of psychiatry and human behavior at the University of California, Irvine School of Medicine in 2016. She transferred to the Wake Forest School of Medicine in 2021, working as the chair of Psychiatry and Behavioral Medicine.
