= Max Gomez =

American journalist (1951–2023)

Max Gomez (August 9, 1951 – September 2, 2023), widely known as Dr. Max, was a Cuban-born American medical journalist. He worked alternatively as the medical correspondent and senior health editor for the flagship television stations WNBC and WCBS in New York City.

== Formative years ==
Born in Havana, Cuba, Gomez graduated cum laude from Princeton University (1973) and earned a Ph.D. from the Wake Forest School of Medicine (1978). He was also an NIH Postdoctoral Fellow at New York's Rockefeller University (1978–1980).

== Professional life ==
As the medical correspondent/senior health editor for the flagship television station WCBS in New York City (1994–1997), Gomez delivered segments on health, science and medicine on the 5 PM news. He held similar positions for WNBC in New York (1991–1994, 1997–2007), and earlier for KYW in Philadelphia (1984–1991), and for WNEW in New York (1980–1984). In July 2007, "Dr. Max", as he was known, rejoined WCBS as a freelance medical reporter. He was the co-author of three books. The Prostate Health Program, The Healing Cell and Cells Are the New Cure: The Cutting-Edge Medical Breakthroughs That Are Transforming Our Health.

== Personal life and death ==
Gomez resided in New York City. He died of cancer on September 2, 2023, at the age of 72.

== Honors ==
Gomez won seven New York Emmy Awards and two Philadelphia Emmy awards. In addition to his broadcast work, Gomez served on the advisory board of HealthCorps. In addition, he was the recipient of the Phelps Memorial Hospital, Community and Well-being Award, 2012(Award recipient for exceptional contribution to health and well-being in the Phelps community and beyond) HHC Award, Excellence in Healthcare Reporting Award (Related Article) The 2011 Public Awareness Award (Alzheimer's)
