= Northern High School (Detroit) =

Public High School in Detroit, Michigan

Coordinates: 42°22′58″N 83°04′50″W

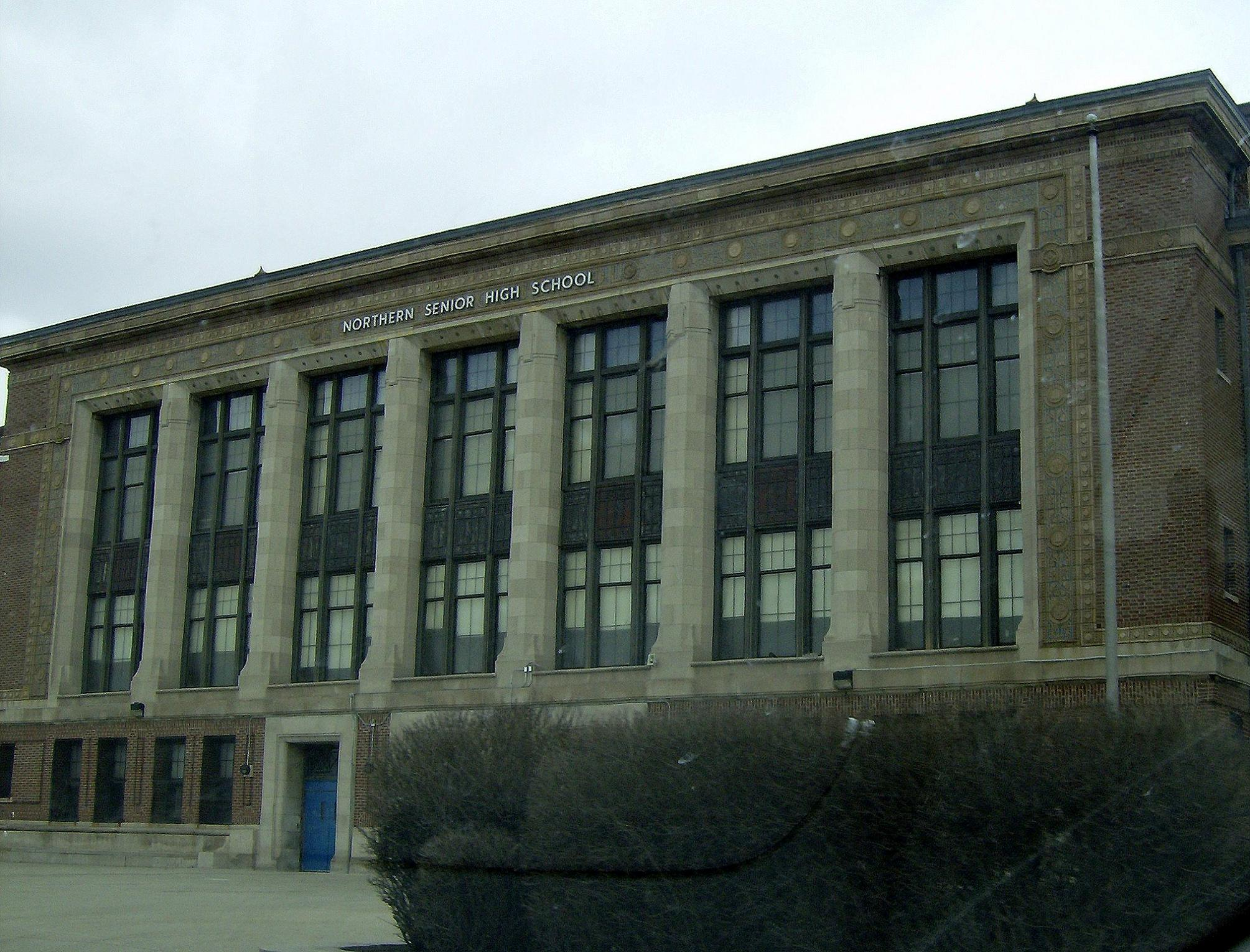

Location
- 9026 Woodward Ave; Detroit, Michigan; United States

Information
- Established: 1916
- Closed: June 22, 2007
- School district: Detroit Public Schools Community District

Northern Senior High School was a public four-year high school located on the north end of Detroit, Michigan, United States. The school was a part of the Detroit Public Schools district. By the latter part of the 2000s, Northern Senior High School was cited for closure as well as several other local high schools in the Detroit School District. The Detroit International Academy is now housed in the building that was formerly known as Northern Senior High School. When Northern existed, it served a portion of New Center.

== History ==
The school was founded in 1916.

In April 1966, over 2,000 students—98% of them African American—walked out of Detroit's Northern High School to protest the poor quality of their education. Their demonstration resulted in the removal of the principal, vice principal, and a school police officer.

The school closed on June 22, 2007.

== Notable alumni ==
- Renaldo "Obie" Benson (1954) of the Four Tops
- Bill Buntin – NBA basketball player (Detroit Pistons).
- Alyce Chenault Gullattee (1946) – physician, psychiatrist, professor at Howard University College of Medicine
- Derrick Coleman (1986) – NBA basketball player (New Jersey Nets, Philadelphia 76ers, Detroit Pistons).
- Marshall Dill (1971) – Track & field athlete.
- Tommy Flanagan – Jazz pianist.
- Aretha Franklin (attended) – Singer–songwriter, pianist ("Queen of Soul").
- Robert Hayden (1930) – Poet.
- Pete Moore (attended) – Musician.
- Harry Newman (1930) – All–Pro football quarterback (University of Michigan).
- Lawrence Payton (1956) of the Four Tops
- Smokey Robinson (1957) – Singer–songwriter.
- Sam Williams (1964) – NBA basketball player (Milwaukee Bucks).
