= Douglass Academy for Young Men =

High school in Detroit, Wayne County, Michigan

Coordinates: 42.3495°N 83.0839°W

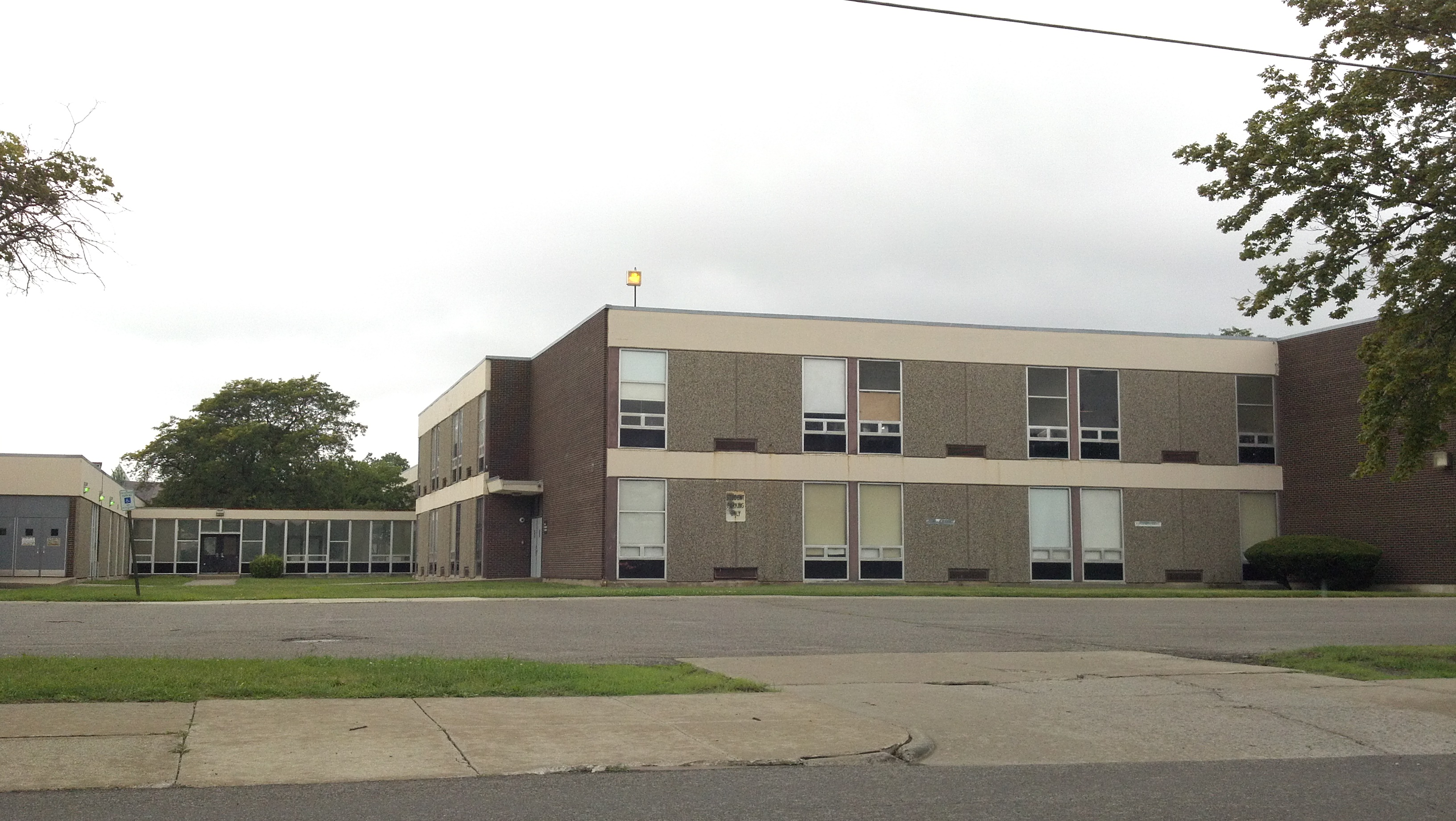
Douglass Academy for Young Men

Frederick Douglass Academy for Young Men is a Detroit, Michigan grade 9-12 school exclusively for boys. It is a part of Detroit Public Schools Community District (DPS), and it is the only all-male public school in the State of Michigan. It is named after Frederick Douglass and it is located in Woodbridge, in the former Murray–Wright High School.

As of 2012 the school has about 200 students.

== History ==
In July 2006, the Michigan Legislature passed a bill permitting the establishment of all girls' and boys' public schools. The school moved into its current location in 2008.

On Thursday March 29, 2012 50 students walked out of classes to protest against the removal of the school's principal and a lack of and perceived inconsistency in the school's teachers. The activist Helen Moore and two Detroit Public Schools school members, Reverend David Murray and LaMar Lemmons III, marched with the students. The 50 students were suspended from school.

== Academics ==
Student assessments
- 2021–22 school year Change vs. prior year

M-STEP 11th grade proficiency rates (Science / Social Studies)
- Advanced %: ≤50 / ≤50
- Proficient %: ≤50 / ≤50
- PR. Proficient %: – / –
- Not Proficient %: – / –

Average test scores
- SAT Total: 766.4 (▼ −13.6)

As of 2012 it typically meets federal adequate yearly progress academic standards; it is one of the few Detroit Public Schools high schools to do so. In 2011 the school did not meet those standards in the English language arts.

== DPS offices and facilities ==
The DPS Office of Code of Conduct, Student Assistance and Support is located in the South Wing of the Douglass building.

The DPS Office of Specialized Student Services (Special Education) Placement Center is in Room 168 of the South Wing.

== See also ==
- Detroit International Academy for Young Women – A public all-girls school in Detroit
