= Coy Cornelius Carpenter =

- Born: 24 April 1900
- Died: 7 November 1971 (aged 71)
- Occupations: educator writer
- Known for: education
- Spouse: Dorothy (Mitten) Carpenter

Coy Cornelius Carpenter M.D. (April 24, 1900 – November 7, 1971), was first dean of the School of Medicine of Wake Forest University from 1936 to 1967 and vice president for health affairs from 1963 to 1967. He guided the school through the transition from a two-year to a four-year program and the move from Wake Forest to Winston-Salem in 1941. He also authored The Story of Medicine at Wake Forest University (Chapel Hill: University of North Carolina Press, 1970). He resided in Winston-Salem, North Carolina.

The Wake Forest University School of Medicine's Coy C. Carpenter Library and Dorothy Carpenter Medical Archives are named after the Coy Carpenter and his wife, Dorothy (Mitten) Carpenter.
