= Wake Forest School of Medicine =

Medical school of Wake Forest University

Coordinates: 36.0902°N 80.2686°W

Wake Forest University School of Medicine
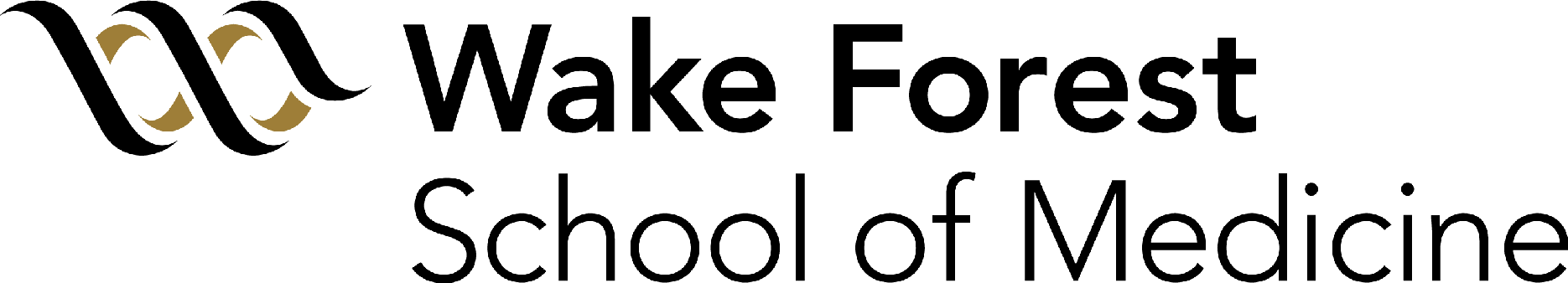
- Former names: Wake Forest College Medical School; Bowman Gray School of Medicine; Wake Forest University School of Medicine
- Type: Private medical school
- Established: 1902
- Parent institution: Wake Forest University
- Affiliations: Atrium Health Wake Forest Baptist
- Dean: L. Ebony Boulware, MD, MPH
- Faculty: 1,165
- Students: 469 M.D. students 16 MD/PhD students 298 graduate students 150 P.A. students
- Location: Winston-Salem, North Carolina, United States
- Campus: Urban
- Colors: Old gold and black
- Website: school.wakehealth.edu

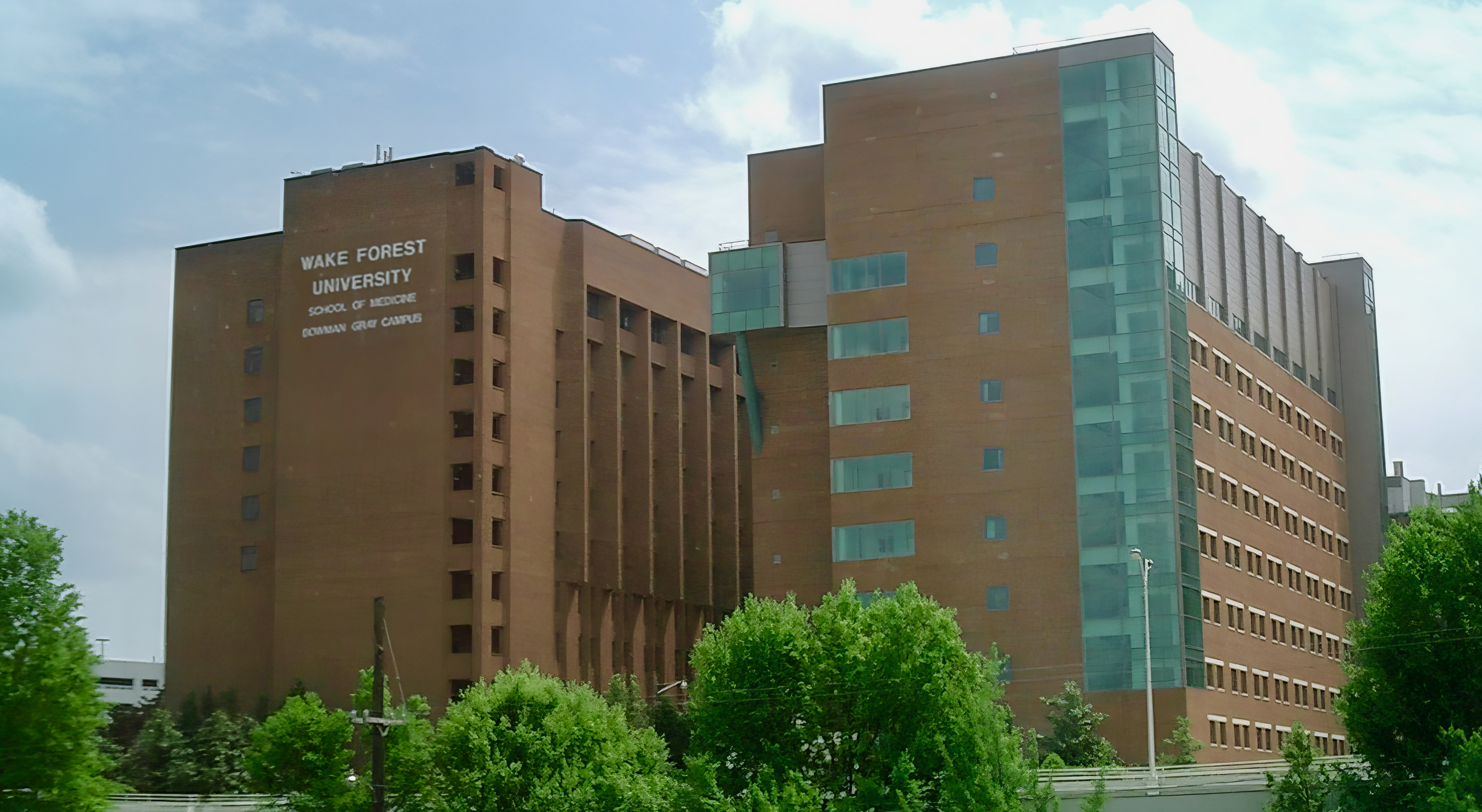
Wake Forest University School of Medicine, Bowman Gray campus in Winston-Salem, North Carolina.

Wake Forest University School of Medicine is the medical school of Wake Forest University, with two campuses located in Winston-Salem, North Carolina and Charlotte, North Carolina, United States. It is affiliated with Atrium Health Wake Forest Baptist, the academic medical center whose clinical arm is Atrium Health Wake Forest Baptist. In 2021, U.S. News & World Report ranked Wake Forest School of Medicine 48th best for research in the nation and 80th best for primary care. The School of Medicine also ranks in the top third of U.S. medical schools in funding from the National Institutes of Health (NIH).

== Winston-Salem Campus ==
=== History and background ===
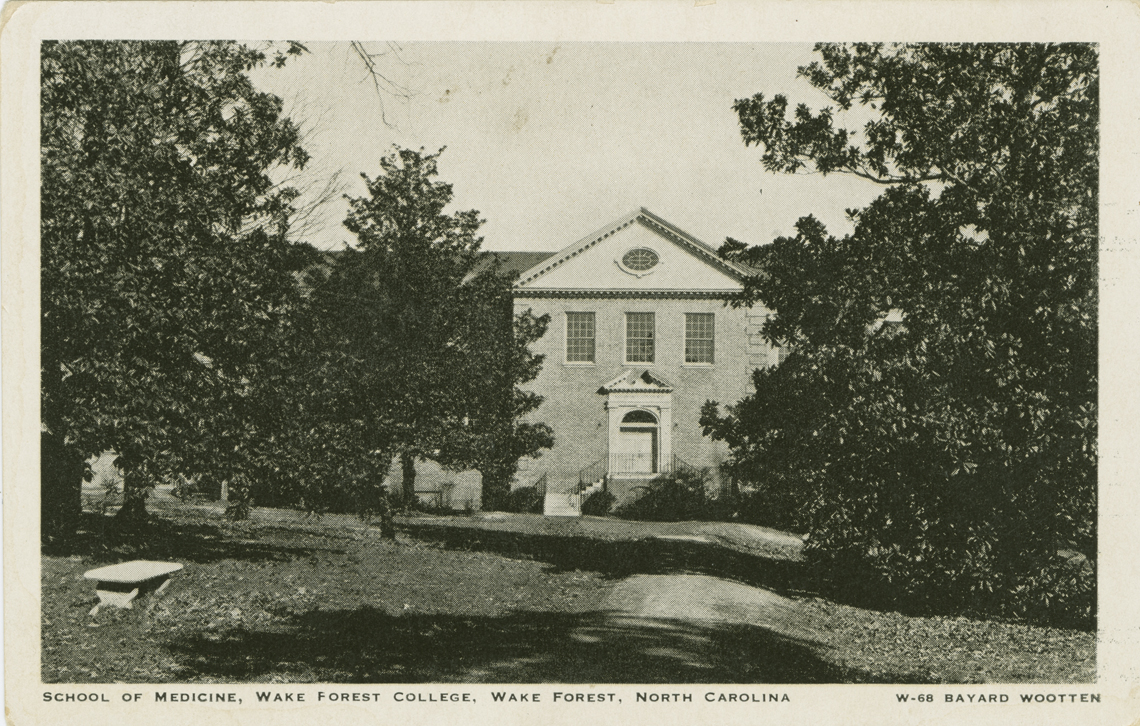
The original School of Medicine building in Wake Forest, North Carolina.

In 1902, the two-year Wake Forest College Medical School was founded on the college campus in Wake Forest, North Carolina. Thirteen students made up the charter medical class. Tuition was $37.50 per term; additional fees were charged for laboratories and student health care.

The Southern Baptist denomination in 1919 began its first planning for a hospital directed primarily at the care of the poor. Applications were received from Raleigh, High Point, Charlotte, Greensboro, Salisbury and Winston-Salem. The Southern Baptists chose Winston-Salem, and an 88-bed hospital opened there in 1923.

In the wake of a 1935 Carnegie Foundation report suggesting the dissolution of two-year medical schools, those schools began to consider alternatives. Meanwhile, the death of Bowman Gray, the president of R.J. Reynolds Tobacco Co. in Winston-Salem, also in 1935, led his family to consider how to best make use of $750,000 that he left to be put toward a community cause. The Gray family decided to offer the money to a medical school willing to relocate to Winston-Salem. After the University of North Carolina rejected a chance to obtain the money because it did not want to leave Chapel Hill, Wake Forest's medical school dean, Coy Cornelius Carpenter, in 1939 helped to forge a deal for the funds. In 1941, Bowman Gray School of Medicine opened on the campus of N.C. Baptist Hospital with 75 students, including 45 freshmen and 30 sophomores.

The rest of Wake Forest University would follow the medical school to Winston-Salem in 1956, in an effort led by the family of R.J. Reynolds.

The school became known for its innovative curriculum and prominent faculty members, including:

- Camillo Artom, a renowned Italian biochemistry expert who fled Italy to escape fascism, and who, at Wake Forest, worked with lipids in research on atherosclerosis, among other subjects.
- Richard Masland, a professor of psychiatry and neurology who later became director of the National Institute of Neurological Diseases and Blindness. He encouraged faculty to pursue research grants, which helped the school in its push toward research and growth as an academic medical center.
- James Toole, a neurologist who opened the Stroke Center soon after arriving in 1962 and who wrote a widely used text, Cerebrovascular Disorders.

A flurry of building projects beginning in the late 1950s began a period of expansion that continues today. More than $700 million was spent on new buildings and equipment for the School of Medicine and medical center campus in the 1990s and 2000s. In 1997, the school was renamed Wake Forest University School of Medicine, and the medical school campus became the Bowman Gray Campus.

On April 7, 2000, developer David Shannon announced plans for a three-story building in Piedmont Triad Research Park in downtown Winston-Salem which would house the medical school's physician assistant program. This would be the school's second department downtown; the Department of Physiology and Pharmacology had already moved into the research park's first building, Piedmont Triad Community Research Center.

In 2011, the school's name would be changed slightly again, to Wake Forest School of Medicine, as a part of a restructuring that also renamed the institution's clinical component as Wake Forest Baptist Health.

The School of Medicine's strong research focus is evident in its translational work, which raised about $345.5 million in licensing revenues from 2010-2014. The newer buildings and facilities that are a focus of research for students and faculty are Ardmore Tower, which is home to Brenner Children's Hospital, the J. Paul Sticht Center on Aging and Rehabilitation, the Comprehensive Cancer Center and Wake Forest Innovation Quarter. The latter is a 200-acre, mixed-used center in downtown Winston-Salem focusing on the biomedical and material sciences and information technology fields. Tenants at the Innovation Quarter include the Wake Forest Institute for Regenerative Medicine (WFIRM), which was established in 2004 and has risen to national prominence. WFIRM's scientists are working to engineer more than 30 different replacement tissues and organs and to develop healing cell therapies—all with the goal to cure, rather than merely treat, disease.

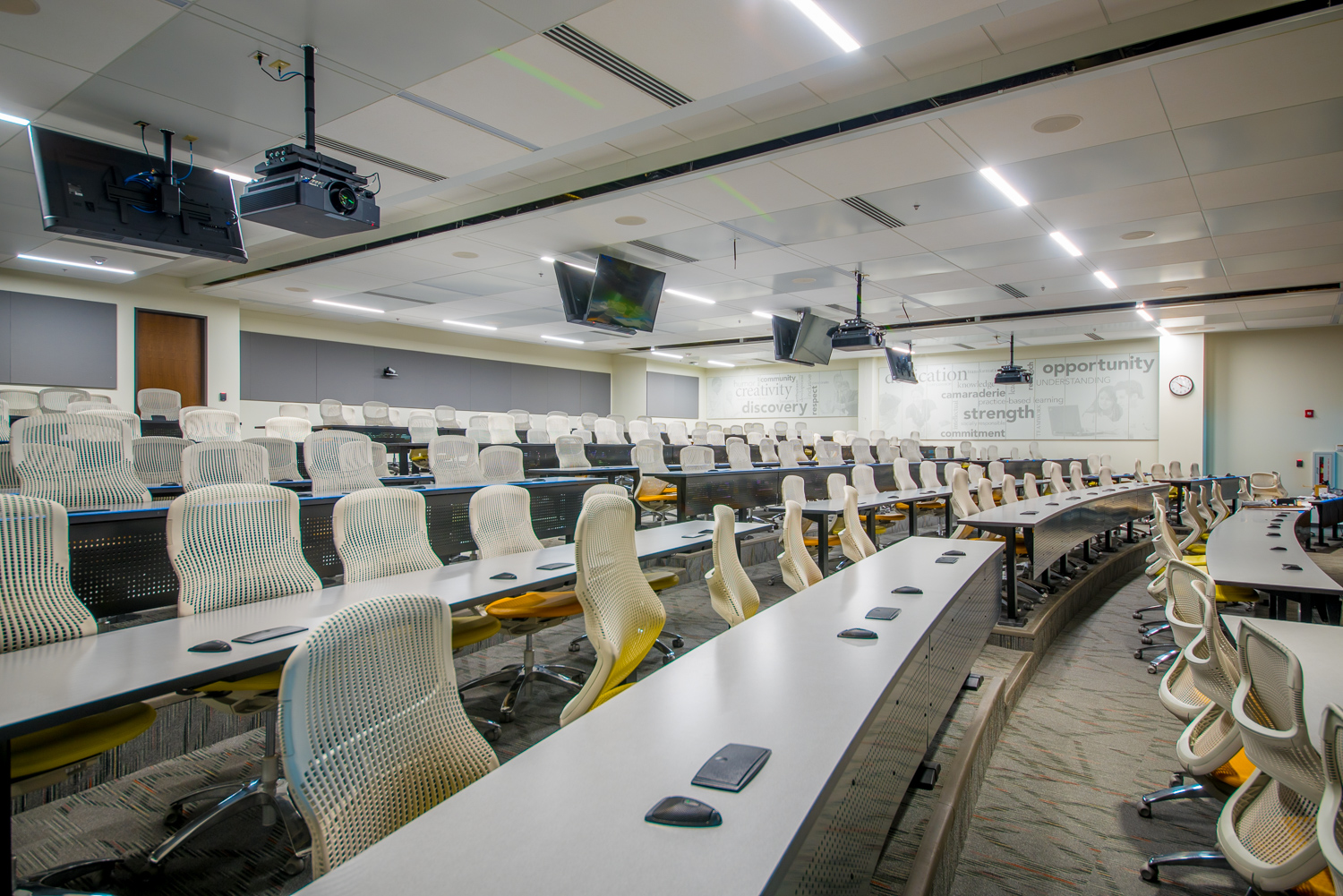
Tiered learning classroom at Wake Forest School of Medicine

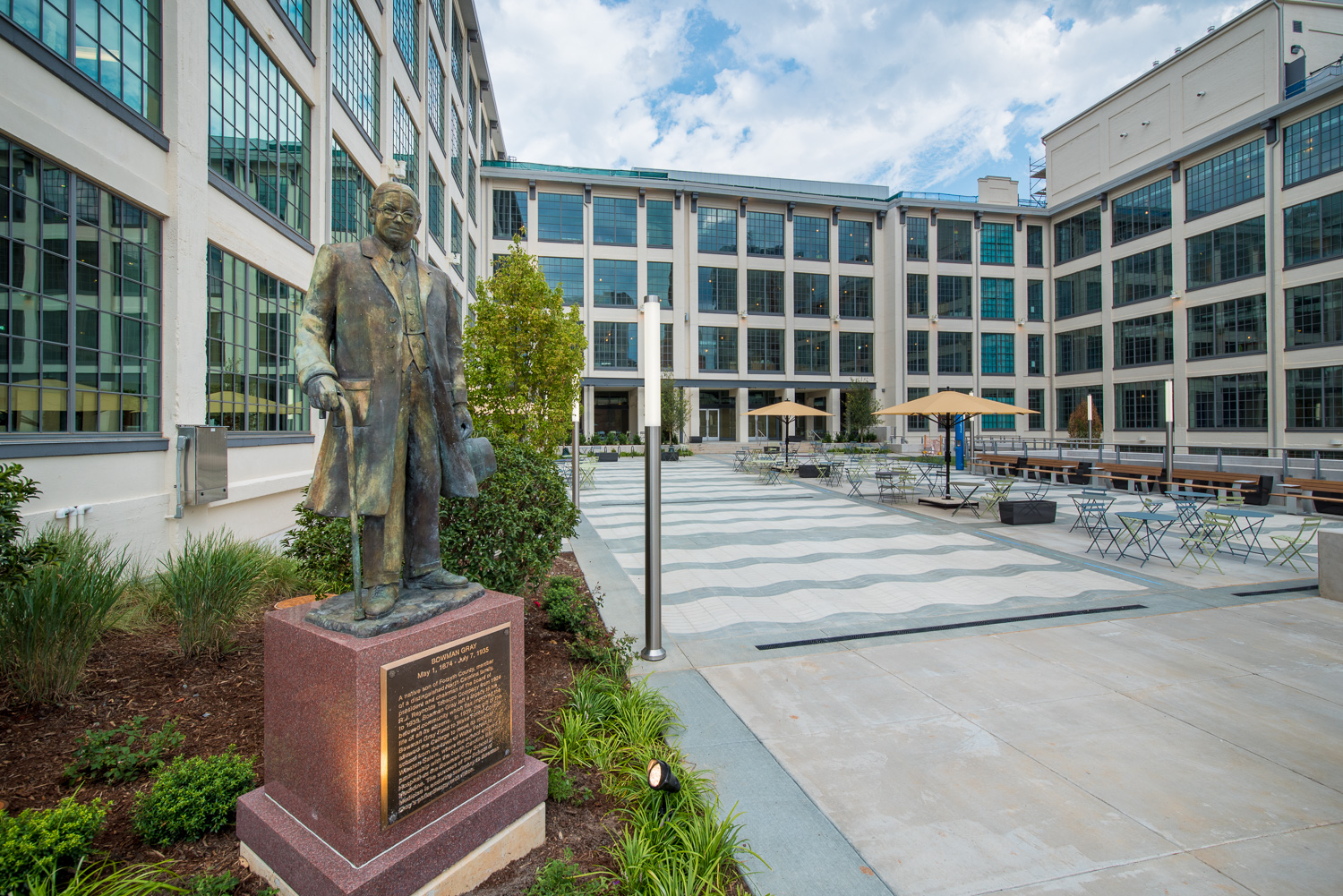
Wake Forest School of Medicine - Bowman Gray Center for Medical Education

In July 2016, the School of Medicine opened the Bowman Gray Center for Medical Education, a $50 million, state-of-the-art building in downtown Winston-Salem's Innovation Quarter. The new campus occupies 168,000 square feet in a former R.J. Reynolds Tobacco Company plant next to Wake Forest Biotech Place, with half the cost being paid for by historic tax credits.

=== Admissions and rankings ===
For the entering class of 2021, 10,703 students applied for admission, 504 were interviewed, and 326 were accepted for 145 spots giving rise to a 3% acceptance rate.

=== Academics and curriculum ===
The School of Medicine is a member of the Association of American Medical Colleges (AAMC) and is accredited by the Liaison Committee on Medical Education (LCME), which is jointly sponsored by the Council on Medical Education of the American Medical Association (AMA) and the AAMC.

In 2017, the 'Wake Ready!' curriculum was implemented changing the focus from the traditional 2 preclinical + 2 clinical years of curriculum to three phases. During the first phase, Foundations, which is 18 months in length, basic science courses are integrated with both clinical and patient care organized by systems. Additionally, students learn about bedside clinical skills, bioethics and population health. The second phase, Immersion, is 12 months in length, allows students to rotate through a series of required clerkships in which the students are members of the medical team learning to treat patients in a hospital setting. Students complete 8 weeks of internal medicine, 7 weeks of surgery, 6 weeks of pediatrics, 2 weeks of ambulatory internal medicine, 7 weeks of obstetrics/gynecology & women's health, 4 weeks of family medicine, 4 weeks of psychiatry, 4 weeks of neurology, and 2 weeks of anesthesiology during this time. Additionally, radiology and basic clinical procedures are integrated longitudinally. The last phase, Individualization, is 14 months in length and allows for students to choose their rotations based on their interests and future career plans, including time for research or away rotations at other institutions. Students also have the opportunity to do electives in foreign countries and gain exposure to the differences in care in other countries.

Students do clinical and research work primarily with Wake Forest Baptist Medical Center, Wake Forest Baptist Health—Brenner Children's Hospital, W.G. Hefner Salisbury Veterans Affairs Medical Center and the Virginia Tech-Wake Forest School of Biomedical Engineering and Sciences.

=== Joint degree programs ===
The School of Medicine offers, in conjunction with Wake Forest University's Graduate School of Arts and Sciences, a joint M.D./Ph.D. degree from the M.D./Ph.D. Program It also offers a joint M.D./M.A. degree in bioethics.

The joint Ph.D./M.B.A. program was established in 1999 by the Wake Forest University Graduate School of Arts and Sciences and the Schools of Business, with the goal of providing Ph.D. scientists with the opportunity to obtain advanced business training and internship opportunities.

Finally, there is an M.D./M.S. offered in Clinical and Population Translational Sciences through Wake Forest University's Department of Public Health Sciences.

=== Institutes and centers ===
Physicians, scientists and students at Wake Forest School of Medicine often work in the research- or education-based institutes and centers affiliated with the school. These include:

Institutes and research-based centers

- Childress Institute for Pediatric Trauma
- Clinical and Translational Science Institute
- Wake Forest Institute for Regenerative Medicine
- Brain Tumor Center of Excellence
- Center for Biomedical Informatics
- Center for Biomolecular Imaging
- Center for Cancer Genomics
- Center for Diabetes Research
- Center for Genomics and Personalized Medicine Research
- Center for Integrative Medicine
- Center for Worker Health
- Comprehensive Cancer Center
- Hypertension and Vascular Research Center
- Maya Angelou Center for Health Equity
- J. Paul Sticht Center on Aging and Rehabilitation
- Wake Forest Primate Center

Education and training-based centers

- Center for Applied Learning
- Center of Excellence for Research, Training and Learning
- Women's Health Center of Excellence for Research, Leadership, Education

Innovation-based centers

- Wake Forest Innovations
- Center for Healthcare Innovation

=== Student life ===
Students participate in a number of volunteer and common-interest organizations. Delivering Equal Access to Care (DEAC) is a student-run clinic serving uninsured, low-income residents of Winston-Salem. Oasis is an online magazine that publishes student artistic and literary works. Other student organizations include interest groups that correspond with particular specialties and Wake Forest chapters of the American Medical Association, Student National Medical Association and Operation Smile. Many students also are active in intramural sports organized through the university.

A significant number of students also participate in research, and the Medical Student Research Program funds student research projects during the summer between their first and second years. The School of Medicine also participates in the Albert Schweitzer Fellowship program, with a number of students winning fellowships each year.

=== Notable faculty and alumni ===
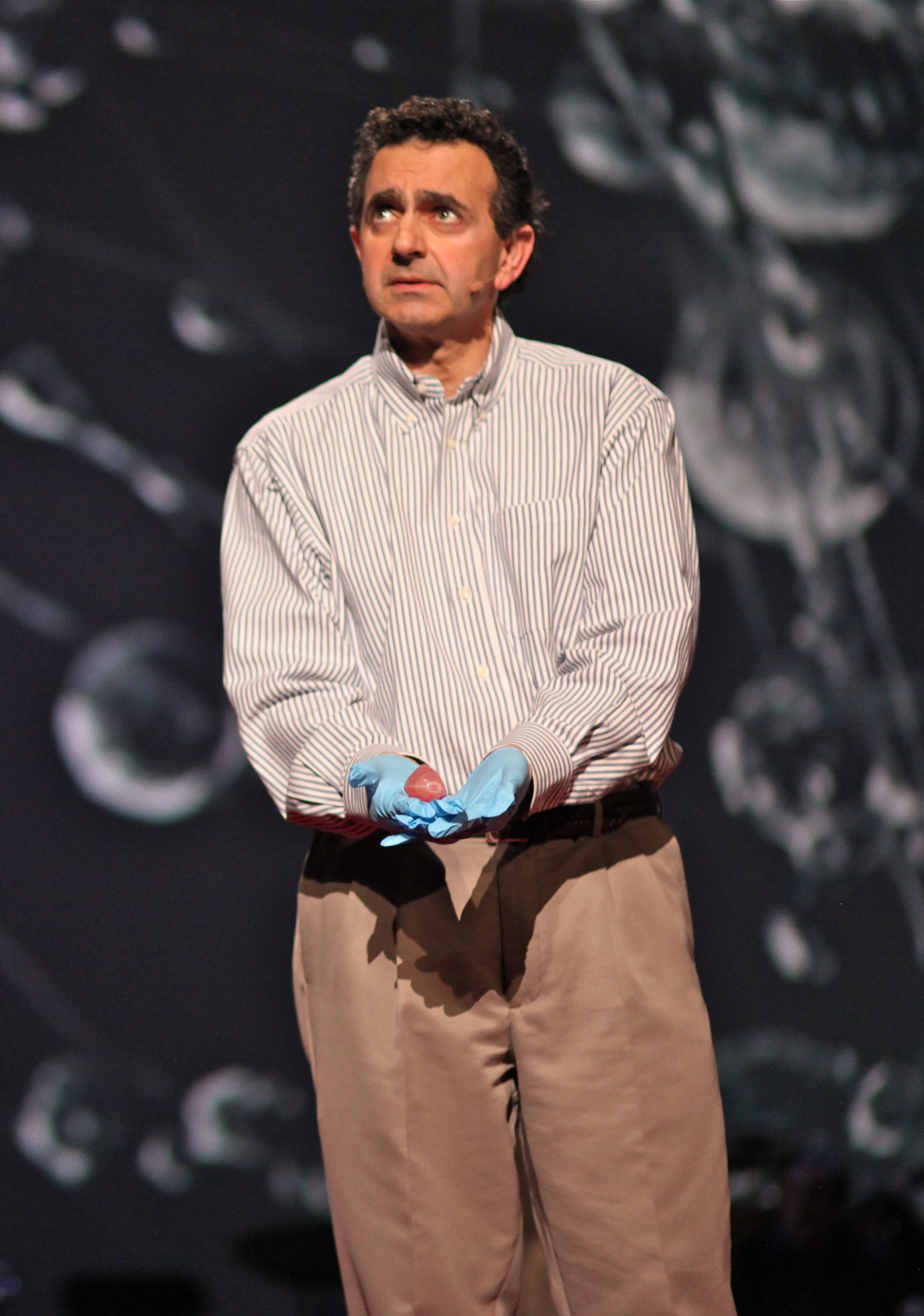
Anthony Atala, M.D.

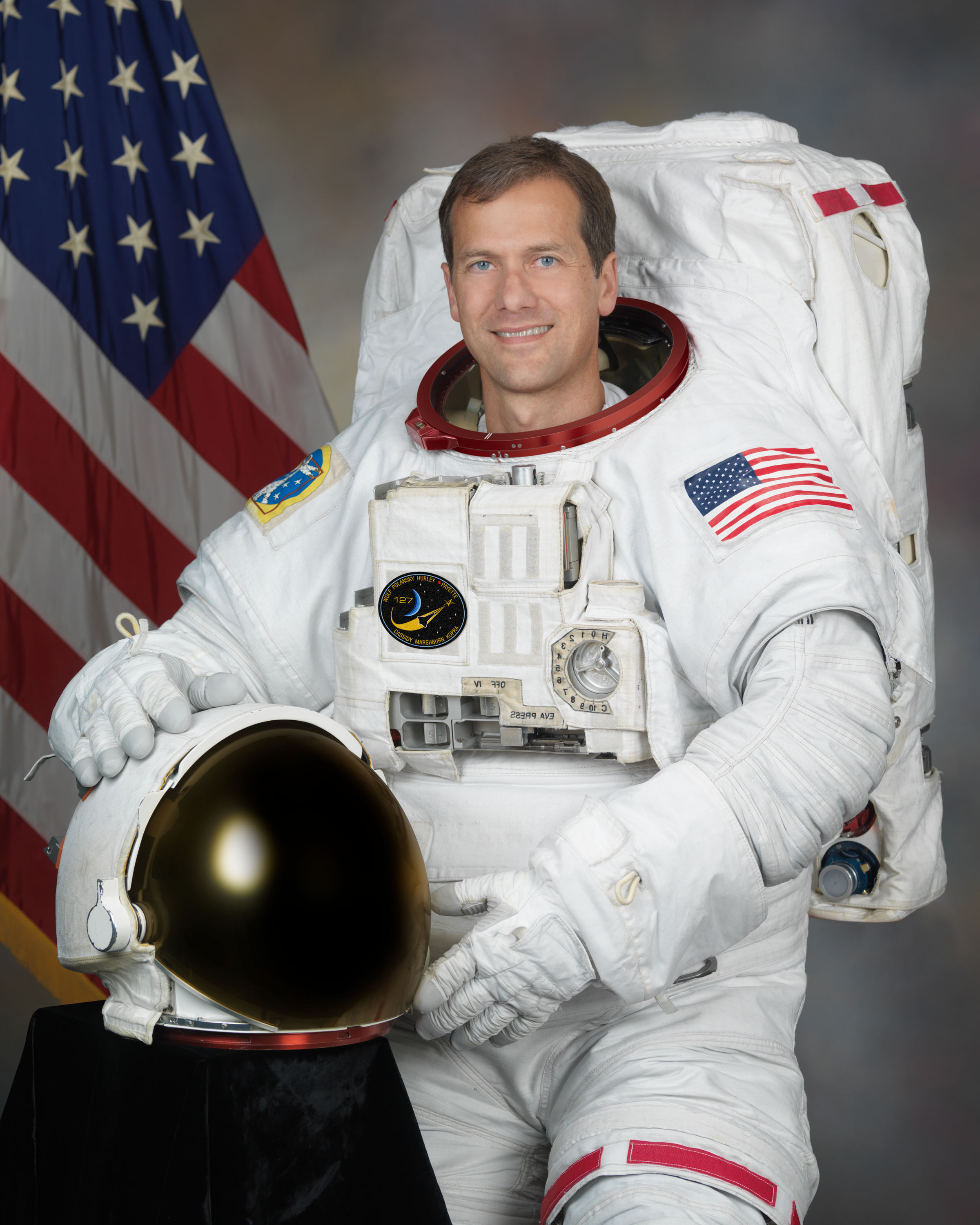
Thomas Marshburn, M.D.

- William Allan, genetics
- Anthony Atala, regenerative medicine and urology
- Ruth Benca, sleep medicine
- Ken Blum, neuropsychopharmacology and genetics
- Paul Bucy, neurology and neurosurgery
- Coy Cornelius Carpenter, dean
- Richard Cytowic, neurology
- James Forrester, politician
- Dwayne Godwin, neuroscientist and author
- Max Gomez, medical reporter
- Tinsley Randolph Harrison, internal medicine
- Seth C. Hawkins, emergency/wilderness medicine
- David L. Heymann, infectious disease
- Robert Lanza, regenerative medicine
- Thomas T. Mackie, preventative medicine and infectious disease
- Thomas Marshburn, astronaut
- Jerry Punch, ESPN commentator
- Russel J. Reiter, biology of melatonin
- Leon S. Robertson, epidemiology

== Charlotte campus ==
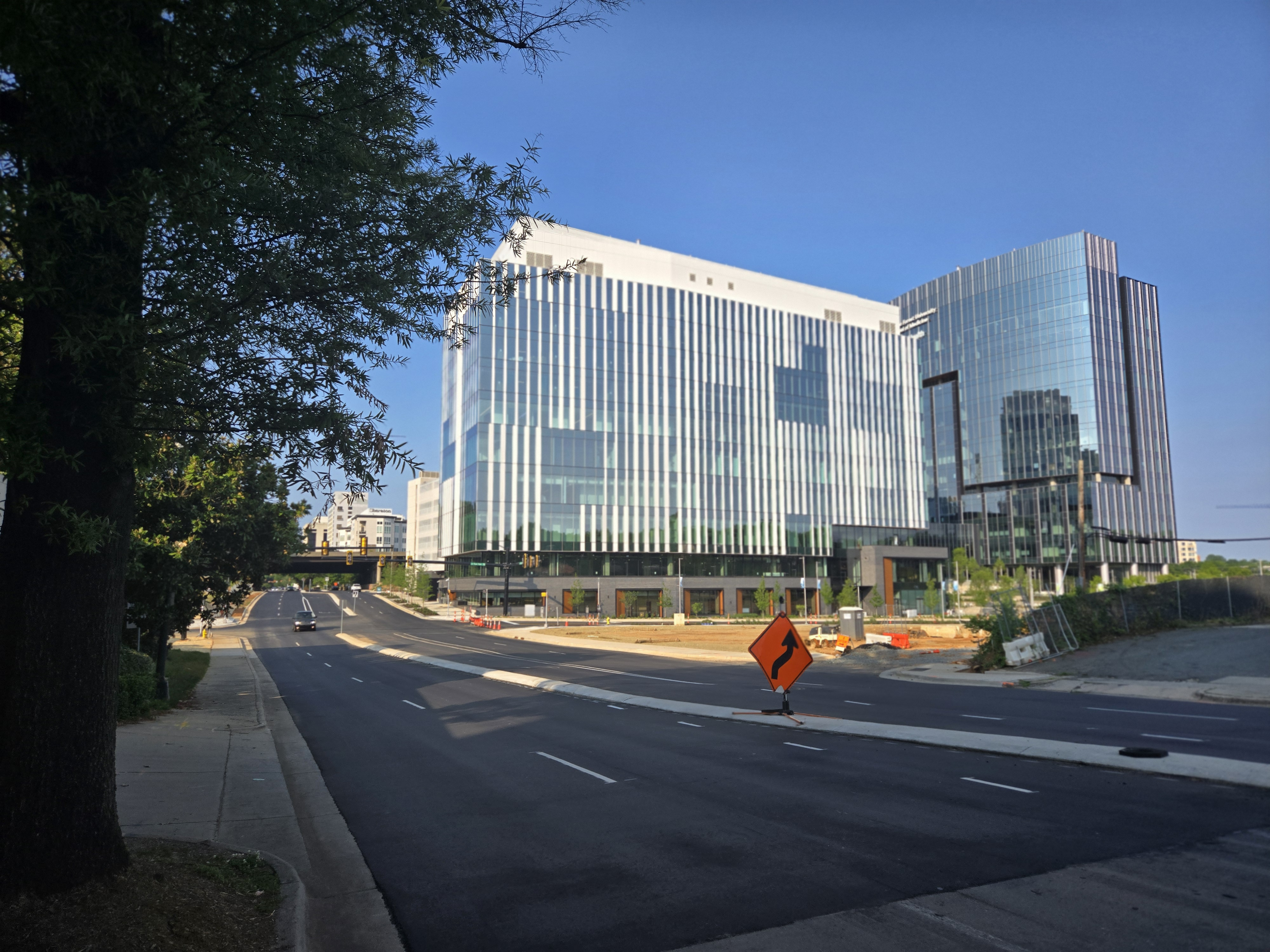
The Pearl, which includes the Charlotte campus

As of 2021, Charlotte was the largest city in the United States without a four-year medical school. On April 10, 2019, Wake Forest Baptist Medical Center and Atrium Health announced that the School of Medicine would have a second campus in Charlotte, North Carolina. Preliminary plans for the campus were revealed August 12, 2020. More specific details were revealed in February 2021 including a seven-story tower, and on March 24, 2021, Atrium Health announced a 20-acre Innovation District at Baxter and McDowell Streets in the Midtown neighborhood of Charlotte. The Innovation District, named The Pearl on March 3, 2022, will include the medical school, residential towers, a hotel, and retail and office space. Construction was expected to start in 2022 with the first students attending in 2024.

The medical school campus formally opened June 2, 2025, with 48 students expected to enroll in July. The campus included a 14-story building and more than 700,000 square feet.

== See also ==
- Innovation Quarter
- The Pearl
