= Russel J. Reiter =

Biologist

- Born: 1936 (age 89–90)
- Scientific career
- Institutions: The University of Texas Health Science Center

Russel J. Reiter (born 1936) is an American researcher and Professor of Cell Systems and Anatomy at the University of Texas Health Science Center. He is one of the top highly cited researchers (h>100) according to webometrics. He is known for his research on melatonin over a period of more than six decades.
