= Wake Forest University School of Business =

Graduate business school of Wake Forest University

Coordinates: 36.1373537°N 80.275078°W

- Type: Private business school
- Established: 1948; 78 years ago
- Parent institution: Wake Forest University
- Accreditation: AACSB International
- Dean: Annette L. Ranft
- Faculty: 111
- Administrative staff: 119
- Students: 1,986
- Undergraduates: 1,314
- Postgraduates: 672
- Location: Winston-Salem, North Carolina, United States
- Campus: Urban
- Colors: Old gold & Black
- Website: business.wfu.edu

The Wake Forest University School of Business is the business school of Wake Forest University, a private research university in Winston-Salem, North Carolina. It offers undergraduate programs to around 1,314 students, as well as management-related master's programs. The school is accredited by the Southern Association of Colleges and Schools (SACS) Commission on Colleges and the Association to Advance Collegiate Schools of Business (AACSB), and it has supplemental accounting accreditation from the latter agency. It has a second campus in The Pearl Innovation District in Charlotte, North Carolina.

== History ==
The School of Business Administration, established in 1948, was renamed the Charles H. Babcock School of Business Administration in 1969. It admitted its first classes of full-time and executive students in 1971 and produced its first graduating class in 1973. In 1972, the school transitioned to enrolling only graduate students, and the name was changed to the Babcock Graduate School of Management. The Babcock School, which earned AACSB accreditation in 1985, was established with a gift from the Mary Reynolds Babcock Foundation and named in honor of Charles H. Babcock, a businessman and philanthropist who influenced civic, cultural, and economic development in Winston-Salem and North Carolina.

In 1980, the Department of Business and Accountancy was reconstituted as the School of Business and Accountancy; the name was changed to the Wayne Calloway School of Business and Accountancy in 1995. In 1993, the school moved into the newly constructed Worrell Professional Center, the first building in the nation to house both a graduate business school and a law school under one roof. The Calloway and Babcock schools were integrated as the Wake Forest University School of Business in 2009, combining their faculties to serve both undergraduate and graduate students.

In 1987, Babcock launched its evening Master of Business Administration (MBA) program in Winston-Salem, followed by an evening MBA program in Charlotte in 1995 and a Saturday MBA program in Charlotte in 2004. It was announced in the fall of 2014 that the full-time MBA program would be discontinued to focus on its evening program, with the last full-time class matriculating in the spring of 2016.

=== Deans ===
Annette L. Ranft (2022–Present): Previously Dean of Auburn University's Harbert College of Business and Dean at North Carolina State University's Poole College of Management.

Charles Iacovou: Previously the Vice Dean, Senior Associate Dean of Faculty, Senior Associate Dean of Graduate School Programs and Director of the full-time MBA program.

Steve Reinemund: Previously PepsiCo's Chairman and CEO; Executive in residence at the School of Business in 2015.

R. Charles Moyer (1997-2002): Integon Chair of Finance at the Babcock Graduate School of Management after joining the faculty in 1988; Babcock Educator of the Year in 1990.

Gary Costley (1995-1997): Previously Executive Vice President and Area Director of Kellogg North America; Chairman of the Board, President and Chief Executive Officer of International Multifoods Corporation.

John McKinnon (1989-1995): Previously President of Sara Lee Corp.

== Academics ==
Undergraduate programs offered include a Bachelor of Science (BS) degree program with majors in finance, accountancy, decision analytics, and business enterprise management. Graduate business programs include an MBA, MS in Management, an MS in Business Analytics, and an MS in Accountancy. Joint degree programs are also offered: an MD/MBA; a PhD/MBA; a combined MBA with an MS in Accountancy; and an MBA and J.D. from the Wake Forest School of Law.

=== Degrees ===
==== Bachelor of Science ====
Students who enroll in this degree program can choose to major in finance, accountancy, decision analytics, or business enterprise management.

==== Master of Science in Management ====
This is a 10-month program designed for students with non-business or STEM academic backgrounds and/or limited business knowledge. Specifically it is for recent liberal arts, sciences, and engineering graduates. The coursework covered includes business concepts related to finance, marketing, accounting, communications, strategy, operations, business analytics, accounting, economics, organizational behavior, law, career management, information technology, and ethics.

The program includes a graduate consulting project that pairs student teams with organizations, an Emerging Leaders Program for students interested in dual degrees in management and physician assistant studies, and an International Leaders Program for international students who desire an MSM and business analytics degree.

Master of Science in Business Analytics

This degree was launched in 2016. Entrance requirements include a bachelor's degree in business, engineering, mathematics, economics, computer science or liberal arts, as well as coursework in calculus and statistics.

Core subject areas covered by the program include: career management; analytics software technology; probability and statistical modeling; analytics in society: security, legal, policy, and enterprise issues with data; and forecasting. There is a practicum that spans three courses and requires students to use what they’ve learned in a real-world project for a corporate partner. STEM and OPT certified.

==== Master of Science in Accountancy ====
Students in this degree program can choose between concentrations in Assurance Services, Tax Consulting, or Financial Transaction Services. The last track is exclusive to Wake Forest.

The school offers an optional third semester for students with an opportunity for a paid, nine-week internship.

==== Master of Business Administration ====
With three program formats across two campuses, the MBA curriculum covers business topics with a global perspective across varying disciplines, including finance, operations, marketing, entrepreneurship, and information technology. Optional concentrations are available in Business Analytics, Strategy and Leadership, Finance, Project Management, and Digital Marketing. In 2025, U.S. News & World Report ranked the Wake Forest MBA as the #1 part-time MBA program in North Carolina for the 15th consecutive year and a top 10% part-time MBA program in the United States.

Students can participate in the MBA program in the following three formats: In-person at either the Winston-Salem or Charlotte campus, Online, or a Hybrid modality that combines in-person select Saturdays at the Wake Forest Charlotte campus with asynchronous online classes.

The following non-degree programs are open to all majors:

- Summer Management Program- a five-week program that offers rising sophomores, juniors, and seniors a fundamental overview of the principles of business, core topics include Accounting, Finance, Marketing, Business Simulation, Managing Information, and Strategy. Completing the Summer Management Program results in 8 hours of course credit.
- Business of Sports (SportsBIZ)- a 19-day online program for rising sophomores, juniors, and seniors who are interested in the business of sports, the SportsBiz program teaches fundamental principles of business by teaming Wake Forest School of Business faculty with sports industry professionals. The SportsBIZ program offers 6 credit hours.

== Ratings ==
For 2026, Wake Forest University School of Business ranks 14th in Poets & Quants’ Best Online MBA Programs in the U.S., up from 25th for 2025. The School of Business ranked No. 18 in Poets & Quants’ 2025 rankings of the Best Undergraduate Business Programs in the U.S.

In 2025, the Best Graduate Schools U.S. News & World Report ranked the school’s part-time MBA program as 19th in the U.S.

The Wake Forest MSBA program was ranked 3rd Best Business Analytics Master’s Degree Program for 2025 by TechGuide.

In 2021, the School of Business received three top five rankings from The Economist:

- #2 in the U.S. for career opportunities
- #2 in the U.S. for alumni ratings of career services
- Master of Science in Management program ranked #5 in the U.S. (and #24 globally)

== Academic Centers and institutes ==
The Wake Forest University School of Business houses several centers and institutions.

- Allegacy Center for Leadership and Character - formed to develop leaders of character with partnerships across the Wake Forest community.
- Center for Private Business - provides access to education and a network of leaders to help privately held companies across North Carolina.
- Center for the Study of Capitalism - provides information to the public about capitalism and topics such as health, climate, education, and security.
- Center for Analytics Impact - provides corporations with continuing education opportunities around analytics for influencing, storytelling, and leadership.

== Lecture series ==
Through the Babcock Leadership Series, the Broyhill Executive Lecture Series, and the Hylton Lecture Series, School of Business students can meet, both formally and informally, with business and government leaders.

The Hylton Lecture Series, established in 1980, was named in honor of Delmar P. Hylton, founder of Wake Forest’s accountancy program in 1949.

Notable speakers have included:

- Elizabeth Dole, former U.S. Senator and former U.S. Secretary of Transportation
- Alan Greenspan, former Chairman of the Federal Reserve Board
- Hugh L. McColl Jr., retired Chairman & CEO of Bank of America
- Bonnie McElveen-Hunter, former U.S. Ambassador to Finland; current Chair of the American Red Cross
- Robert Rubin, former U.S. Secretary of the Treasury; current Director, Citigroup
- Margaret Thatcher, former British Prime Minister
- Anna Cabral, Treasurer of the United States
- John Mackey, Chairman and CEO of Whole Foods Market.

=== Face to Face Speaker Forum ===
In fall 2020, the Office of the President at Wake Forest University launched the Face to Face Speaker Forum to bring world-class names to Winston-Salem. The events in each season cover a variety of topics, including political affairs, arts & culture, innovation & business, and social justice & global issues.

Notable speakers:

- Madeleine Albright, diplomat, political scientist, and former United States Secretary of State
- Michael Beschloss, columnist and historian
- David Brooks, book author and political commentator
- George W. Bush, 43rd President of the United States
- Liz Cheney, former member of U.S. House of Representatives from Wyoming
- Kristin Chenoweth, Emmy and Tony award winning actor and author
- Anderson Cooper, television broadcaster for CNN
- Larry Culp, Chairman and CEO of GE Aerospace
- Cynthia Erivo, actress and singer
- Thomas Friedman, political commentator and author
- Malcolm Gladwell, Canadian journalist and author of “Blink” and “Outliers”
- Doris Kearns Goodwin, biographer, historian, and political commentator
- Dr. Sanjay Gupta, neurosurgeon and medical correspondent
- Chuck Hagel, politician, Army veteran, and former United States Secretary of War
- Daymond John, CEO and Founder of FUBU
- John Legend, Grammy-Award winning singer and songwriter
- Yo-Yo Ma, cellist and child prodigy
- Lt. Gen. H.R. McMaster, retired United States Army lieutenant general
- Peyton Manning, former NFL player and Hall of Famer
- Jon Meacham, historian
- Trevor Noah, comedian, political commentator, and television host
- Peggy Noonan, columnist and former Special Assistant to President Ronald Reagan
- Chris Paul, NBA player and Wake Forest University alum
- Eugene Robinson, columnist and author
- Mitt Romney, former Utah United States Senator and 70th Governor of Massachusetts
- Bryan Stevenson, lawyer and law professor at New York University School of Law
- Jesmyn Ward, novelist and English professor at Tulane University
- Isabel Wilkerson, journalist and author
- Gene Woods, CEO of Advocate Health

The Wake Forest University School of Business and the Allegacy Center for Leadership and Character are Principal Series Sponsors for the Face to Face Speaker Forum.

== Career & Professional Development ==
=== Pre-Wall Street Career Track ===
This program is available for students focused on a career in investment banking, asset management, sales and trading or private equity. It provides students with specific coursework, mentoring and coaching, experiential learning and networking opportunities.

=== Business Solutions ===
Under this program, students complete business projects for local organizations.

=== MBA Global Immersion Program ===
In this program, students travel internationally and complete business projects for different organizations.

=== Ready7 ===
This is a model or toolkit created by the school that helps students develop life skills across seven different areas that include personal branding, networking and leadership.

== Center for Market Readiness Employment ==
The Center for Market Readiness Employment (MRE) staff works with students to assess career options, refine goals, and network with corporate contacts, including alumni at more than 8,000 companies nationwide.

== Student clubs and organizations ==
Students at the Wake Forest University School of Business can choose from among nearly 20 clubs and organizations, or they can participate in a variety of events including the Greater Babcock Open and a Charity Auction. Student organizations include the Black Business Students Association, Entrepreneurs Club, Hispanic Club, Net Impact Club, Strategy and Consulting Club, Women in Business and The Joint Degree Society.

== International relationships ==
The Wake Forest University School of Business has long-standing relationships with international business schools including eight international programs that allow faculty and students from each school to teach and study at the other. The partner schools are Bordeaux School of Business, France; EM-Lyon Graduate School of Management, France; European Business School, Germany; Indian Institute of Management Calcutta, India; Institute of Business Studies, Russia; University of Kaiserslautern, Germany; WHU – Otto Beisheim School of Management, Germany and Vienna University of Economics and Business, Austria.

== Faculty ==
More than 75% of the school's faculty have international consulting, teaching work or research experience. More than 90% hold a PhD or other doctoral degree, 33% serve on a company board of directors, and 30% have experience owning their own company.

== Notable alumni ==
- Ted Budd - U.S. Senator - former member of the United States House of Representatives
- D. Wayne Calloway - former CEO of PepsiCo
- David W. Dupree - Managing Director and CEO, The Halifax Group
- Charlie Ergen - Chairman and CEO, EchoStar Communications Corporation
- Donald E. Flow - Chairman and CEO, Flow Automotive Companies
- Robin Ganzert, PhD - President and CEO of American Humane (Wake Forest BS and MBA '91)
- Todd Gibbons - former CEO, BNY Mellon
- Paul Griggs - US Senior Partner, PWC
- Anil Rai Gupta - Chairman and Managing Director, Havells India
- Kate Hussman - Chief Strategy Officer, Buffalo Bills
- Cheslie Kryst - Attorney and Miss USA 2019
- Tiffany Lakey - Managing Director, Head of Strategy for Wells Fargo Securities, COO for the Global Institutional Capital Group
- Brittany Lavis - Group CEO, Detroit Medical Center
- Brian Nicholson, CFO Alex Lee
- Doug Radi - President, Sweet Loren’s
- Chris Sanders - Director of Admission and Enrollment, Harvard-Westlake School
- Warren Stephens - Chairman, President and CEO, Stephens Inc.
- G. Kennedy Thompson - Chairman, President and CEO, Wachovia Corp.
- Victor L. Velazquez - Executive Director, Maryland State Bar Association
- Alex Wilson - Co-Founder, The Giving Block and Forbes 30 Under 30 for Social Impact in 2021
- Eric C. Wiseman - Chairman, VF Corporation
- John Wolford - NFL Quarterback

== See also ==
- List of business schools in the United States
- List of United States business school rankings
