= Innovation Quarter =

Coordinates: 36.101°N 80.240°W

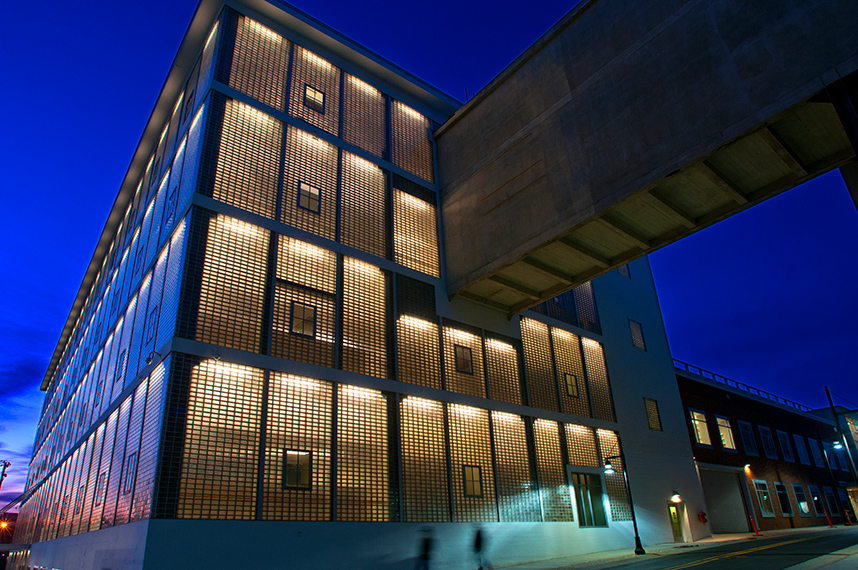
Wake Forest Biotech Building

The Innovation Quarter (formerly Wake Forest Innovation Quarter) is an innovation district in Winston-Salem, North Carolina. biomedical science, information technology, digital media, clinical services, and advanced materials. The Innovation Quarter, operated by Atrium Health Wake Forest Baptist, is home to academic groups, private companies and other organizations located on 330 acres in downtown Winston-Salem. Its tenants include departments from five academic institutions—Wake Forest School of Medicine, Wake Forest University, Forsyth Technical Community College, Winston-Salem State University, University of North Carolina School of the Arts—as well as private businesses and other organizations. One tenant is the Wake Forest Institute for Regenerative Medicine (WFIRM).

== History and growth ==
The idea of a research park in Winston-Salem originated in the early 1990s in the wake of R. J. Reynolds Tobacco Company closing many of its former downtown warehouse and manufacturing buildings. Wake Forest School of Medicine's Department of Physiology and Pharmacology moved into one former Reynolds warehouse in 1993, along with eight researchers from Winston-Salem State University. Civic committees and discussion led to a master plan being announced in 2002 for what was then called Piedmont Triad Research Park.

On August 27, 1998, a former Reynolds factory building burned in one of the city's worst fires. JDL Castle Corporation was renovating Building 256-2 and several other buildings for the research park.

The first new building, One Technology Place, opened in 2000, occupied by Targacept Inc., a biopharmaceutical company that was spun out of R. J. Reynolds Tobacco.

On April 7, 2000, developer David Shannon announced plans for a three-story building on the site of Building 256-2, and in a style recalling that building, which would house the medical school's physician assistant program.

Biotech Place opened in February 2012. The 242,000-square-foot structure is composed of two former Reynolds warehouses renovated into a biotech research facility. The $100 million project was Winston-Salem's most expensive downtown project. It houses Wake Forest School of Medicine's departments of Physiology and Pharmacology, Biomedical Engineering, and Immunology and Microbiology, as well as the Childress Institute for Pediatric Trauma. Piedmont Triad Research Park was renamed in March 2013 as Wake Forest Innovation Quarter in recognition of the shift from biotechnology to a mix of biomedical and material sciences, information technology, and other health and communications fields.

In early 2014, Inmar, Inc. moved into another renovated former R.J. Reynolds building in the Innovation Quarter. The Division of Public Health Sciences in early 2015 completed a move into the Innovation Quarter, in a building called 525@Vine adjacent to Inmar's headquarters. The 525@Vine building, a five-story R.J. Reynolds factory built in 1926 and renovated in 2012-13, also houses the School of Medicine's Physician Assistant program, as well as Forsyth Technical Community College's Emerging Technologies Center.

Also in 2014, work began on 1.6-acre Bailey Park at Fourth Street and Patterson Avenue.

In 2020, the Innovation Quarter announced that it was simplifying its name in order to better reflect the diversity of companies, people and institutions located in the innovation district.

A master plan for the 28-acre Phase II, former site of the city bus station and a location once considered for a soccer stadium, was presented June 14, 2021. Unlike previous development, this area would not include renovated historic buildings, since there were none in the area. About 1 million square feet of clinical, laboratory and office space would be added to the 2.1 million square feet already developed. The plan called for as many as 450 residential units and 30,000 square feet of retail and restaurants. 15 acres would become green space. Fogle Commons would be a space for entertainment and events.

Most work on Phase II stopped after October 2022. $25 million in preliminary site work was finished early in 2025. A new master plan was presented November 13, 2025. At that time it was believed Phase II would take 10 years. The number of buildings as reduced from 10 to 8, but the plan included Falls Branch Plaza, and Linden Center, an existing building Innovation Quarter bought in July 2025. Green space would be 12 acres, down from 15. 1.7 million square feet of mixed-use development was planned.
