= Student National Medical Association =

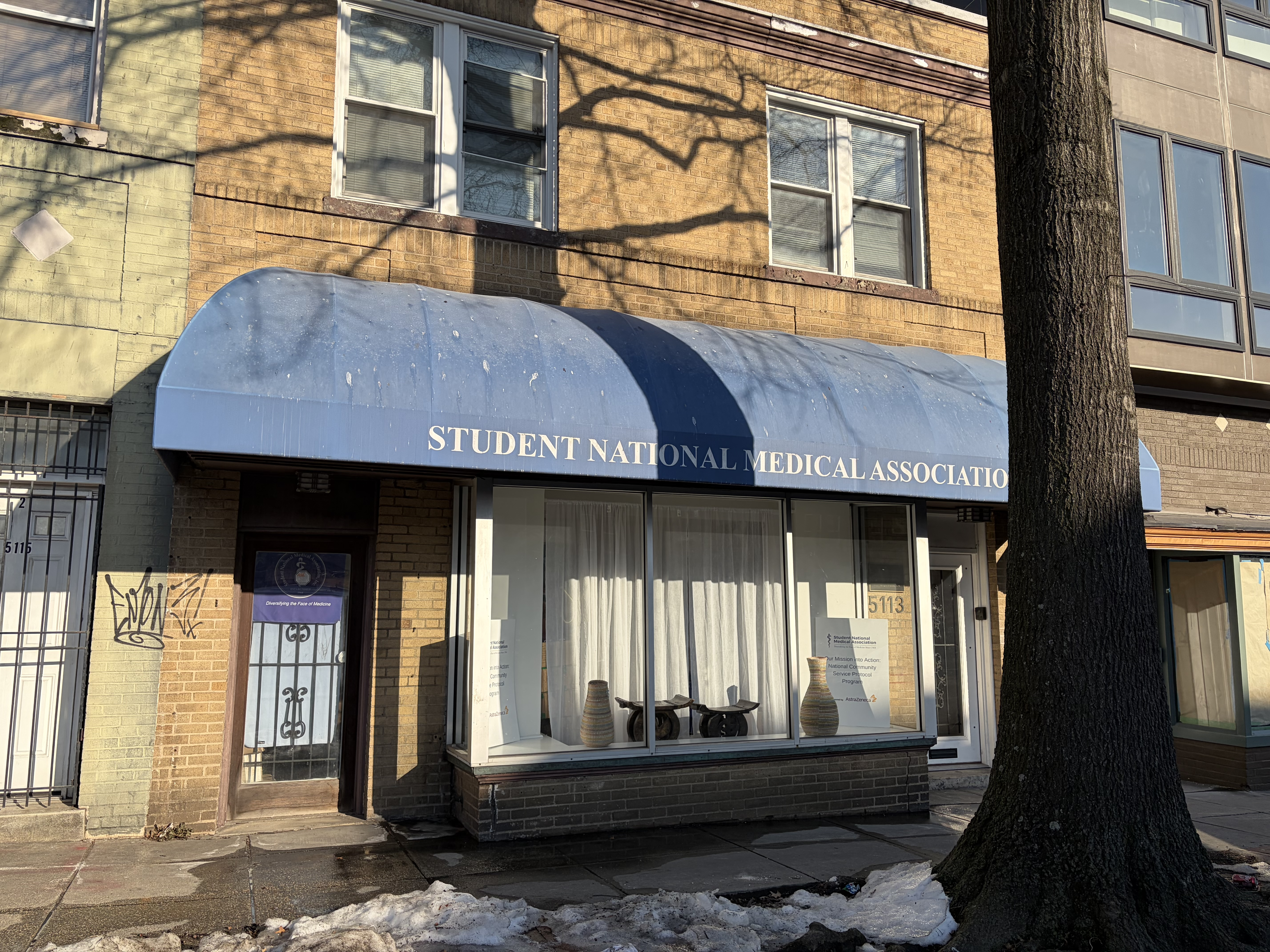
- The Student National Medical Association office on Georgia Avenue in Washington, D.C.
- Formation: 1964
- Type: Student organization, Professional organization
- Headquarters: Washington, DC
- Location: United States
- Members: Over 6,000 Medical students, Pre-medical students, Residents, and Physicians
- Official language: English
- National President: Ja'Nia McPhatter
- Website: http://www.snma.org/

The Student National Medical Association (SNMA), established in 1964, is the oldest and largest independent, student-run organization focused on the needs and concerns of black medical students in the United States. It was established as a subdivision of the National Medical Association in 1964 by medical students from Howard University and Meharry Medical College. The organization is committed to supporting current and future underrepresented minority medical students, addressing the needs of underserved communities, and increasing the number of clinically excellent, culturally competent and socially conscious physicians.

== Composition ==
SNMA has over 190 medical chapters, which implement educational, outreach, and mentoring activities consistent with the goals of the organization. Premedical MAPS chapters work with their host SNMA chapters to hold workshops, speakers, medical campus tours, and advising sessions. Chapters belong to one of ten SNMA regions, each headed by a Regional Director. The Regional Director supports chapter programs and oversees a regional medical education conference, as well as other regional activities.

== 2011-2012 program focus ==
In spring 2011, National President Michael G. Knight introduced the 2010-2011 programmatic strategy that is focused on envisioning the SNMA's organizational future, engaging the SNMA membership, and empowering underserved communities.

== List of National Presidents of the Student National Medical Association ==
- 2005-2006 Kameron Leigh Matthews
- 2006-2007 Brandi Freeman
- 2007-2008 Rory Goodwin
- 2008-2009 Lisa Green
- 2009-2010 Travelle Franklin-Ford
- 2010-2011 Bryant Cameron Webb
- 2011-2012 Michael G. Knight
- 2012-2013 Nisha Branch
- 2013-2014 Courtney Johnson
- 2014-2015 Topaz Sampson
- 2015-2016 Anthony Kulukulualani
- 2016-2017 Christen Johnson
- 2017-2018 Danielle Ward
- 2018-2019 Gabriel Felix
- 2019-2020 Omonivie Agboghidi
- 2020-2021 Osose Oboh
- 2021-2022 Chantel Thompson
- 2022-2023 Nita Gombakomba
- 2023-2024 Veronica Mize
- 2024-2025 Ja'Nia McPhatter

== Annual Medical Education Conference ==
AMEC 2012 Logo

The SNMA Annual Medical Education Conference is a focal activity for the national organization. It is held each spring in various locations around the country. Its purpose is to enhance and facilitate career development, continuing education, and networking among minority medical students. Included in the AMEC is the annual session of the House of Delegates and the election of national officers. The conference attracts over 2,000 students and professionals from across the country, and is consistently the largest gathering of underrepresented minority medical students in the US.

== National protocols ==
National protocols are implemented on the local level by individual SNMA chapters. They reflect the community service goals of the national organization.

=== Pipeline programs ===
- Youth Science Enrichment Program

This program is focused on working with elementary and junior high school students to spark their interest in science and health.

- Health Professions Recruitment Exposure Program

This initiative functions to increase the exposure of high school students to science and careers in the health sciences.

- Minority Association of Pre-medical Students

Pre-medical students are able to form SNMA MAPS chapters at their undergraduate institutions. There are currently over 100 MAPS chapters nationwide that are supported by local SNMA chapters.

=== Minority Association of Premedical Students ===
This initiative represents future underrepresented medical students. Though each chapter is different the goal of these on-campus associations is to unite historically underrepresented minorities that aspire to become physicians and provide them with resources and a social network of premedical students to facilitate the journey to medical school.

=== Health Education and Prevention ===
- Sexual Health Awareness
- Smoking Prevention
- Tissue & Organ Donation Education Recruitment Program (TODER)
- Violence Prevention
- Mental Health: Treatment, Awareness, and Prevention
- Healthy People 2010 Health Fairs
- Obesity Prevention
